= Ōyama Sutematsu =

Japanese socialite and philanthropist (1860–1919)

Princess Ōyama Sutematsu
- 大山 捨松
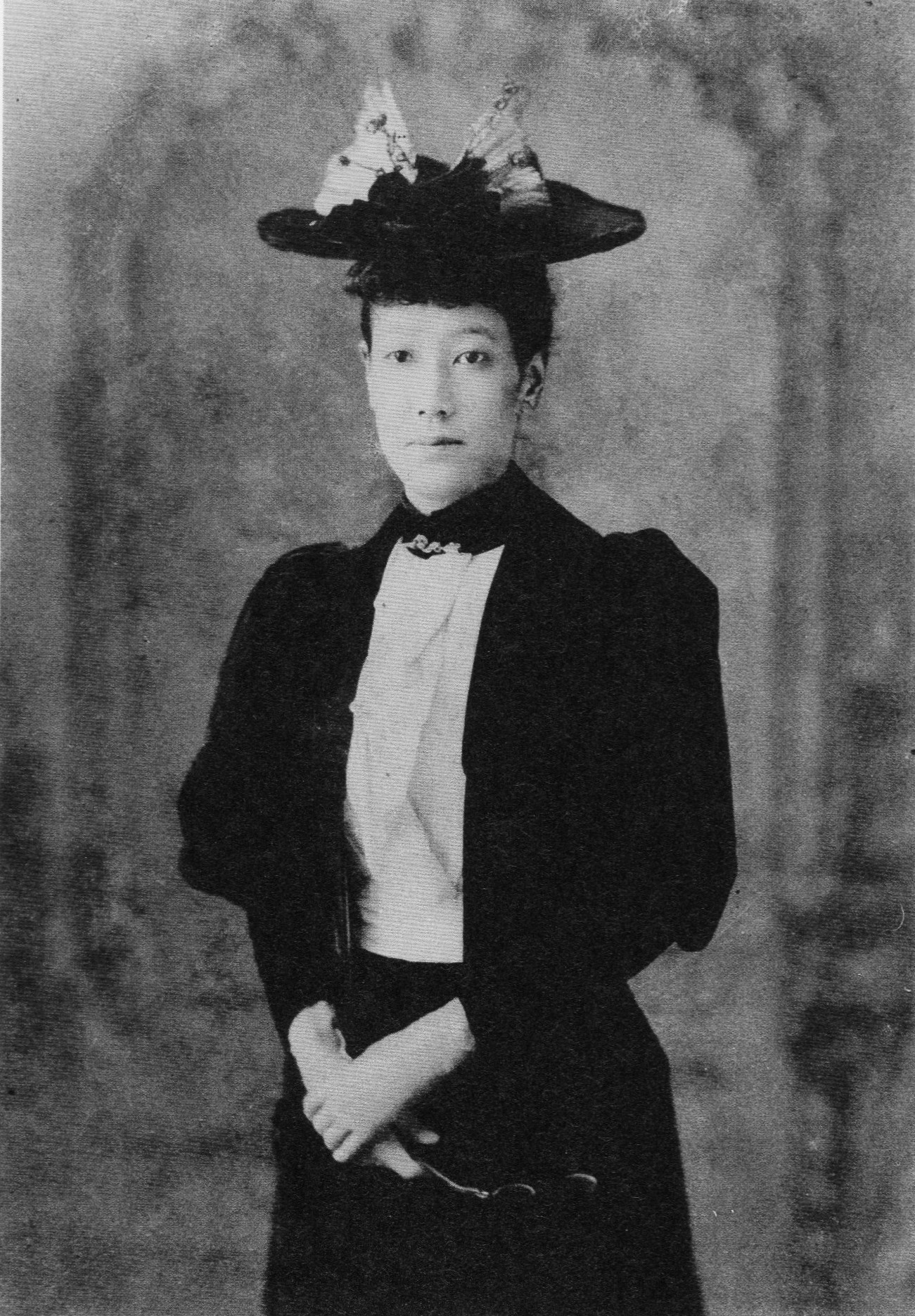
- Marchioness Ōyama Sutematsu in 1903

Personal details
- Born: Yamakawa Sakiko; February 24, 1860 Wakamatsu, Aizu domain, Tokugawa shogunate
- Died: February 18, 1919 (aged 58) Tokyo, Japan
- Resting place: Nasushiobara, Tochigi; 36°53′06″N 139°59′34″E
- Spouse: Ōyama Iwao (m. 1883; died 1916)
- Children: 4 and 3 step-children
- Parents: Yamakawa Shigekata (father); Yamakawa (née Saigō) Tōi (mother)
- Relatives: Yamakawa Misao (sister); Yamakawa Futaba (sister); Yamakawa Kenjirō (brother); Yamakawa Hiroshi (brother); Takamori Saigo (cousin-in-law)
- Education: A.B., magna cum laude 1882
- Alma mater: Vassar College
- Known for: One of five girls on the Iwakura Mission; first Japanese woman to receive a college degree; inspiration for heroine's stepmother in Tokutomi Roka's novel The Cuckoo.
- Other names: Stematz Yamakawa; Yamakawa Saki (山川 さき)

Princess Ōyama Sutematsu (大山 捨松; born Yamakawa Sakiko (山川 咲子); February 24, 1860 – February 18, 1919) was a Japanese socialite in the Meiji era, and the first Japanese woman to receive a college degree. She was born into a traditional samurai household which supported the Tokugawa shogunate during the Boshin War. As a child, she survived the monthlong siege known as the Battle of Aizu in 1868, and lived briefly as a refugee.

In 1871, Yamakawa was one of five girls chosen to accompany the Iwakura Mission to America and spend ten years receiving an American education. At this time, her name was changed to Yamakawa Sutematsu (山川 捨松), or, when she wrote in English, Stematz Yamakawa. Yamakawa lived in the household of Leonard Bacon in New Haven, Connecticut, becoming particularly close with his youngest daughter Alice Mabel Bacon. She learned English and graduated from Hillhouse High School, then attended Vassar College, the first nonwhite student at that fledgling women's university. She graduated with the Vassar College class of 1882, earning an A.B. After graduation, she remained a few more months to study nursing, and finally returned to Japan in October 1882.

When she first returned to Japan, Yamakawa looked for educational or government work, but her options were limited, especially because she could not read or write Japanese. In April 1882, she accepted a marriage proposal from Ōyama Iwao, a wealthy and important general, despite the fact that he had fought on the opposing side of the Battle of Aizu. As her husband was promoted, she was elevated in rank to become Countess, Marchioness, and finally Princess Ōyama in 1905. She was a prominent figure in Rokumeikan society, advising the Empress on Western customs. She also used her social position as a philanthropist to advocate for women's education and volunteer nursing. She assisted in the founding of the Peeresses' School for high-ranking ladies, and the Women's Home School of English, which would later become Tsuda University. She died in 1919 when the 1918 flu pandemic reached Tokyo.

== Early life ==
Yamakawa Sakiko was born on February 24, 1860, in Aizu, an isolated and mountainous region in what is now the Fukushima Prefecture. Her father, Shigekata (重固), was a karō (senior retainer) of Hoshina family who ruled the Aizu domain, and her mother Tōi came from another karō family, the Saigō (西郷). Yamakawa was the youngest child, born a few months after her father's death; she was raised in her grandfather Shigefusa's household. Of her parents' twelve children, seven survived. Yamakawa had three sisters, Futaba (二葉; 1844–1909), Misao, and Tokiwa; and two brothers, Hiroshi (浩; 1845–1898) and Kenjirō (健次郎; 1854–1931).

Yamakawa was raised in a traditional samurai household in the town of Wakamatsu, in a several-acre compound near the northern gate of Tsuruga Castle. She did not attend school, but was taught to read and write at home, as part of a rigorous education in etiquette and obedience based on the eighteenth-century neo-Confucian text Onna Daigaku (Greater Learning for Women). Aizu was known for its emphasis on both education and a strict code of conduct.

=== Battle of Aizu ===
In 1868–1869, Yamakawa's family was on the losing side of the Boshin War. The Boshin War was a civil war at the end of Japan's bakumatsu ("end of military government"), in which pro-shogunate forces resisted the new imperial rule that began with the 1867 Meiji Restoration. The conflict reached Yamakawa's hometown with the Battle of Aizu in late 1868. On October 8, 1868, when Yamakawa was eight, imperial forces invaded and burned her hometown of Wakamatsu. Yamakawa took shelter within the walls of Tsuruga Castle with her mother and sisters. Several hundred people from other samurai families instead committed ritual suicide, in what would become a famous instance of mass suicide. This invasion marked the beginning of a Month-long siege, which came to be a symbol of "heroic and desperate resistance". It was during the Battle of Aizu that the Byakkotai (White Tiger Brigade), a group of teenage fighters, famously committed mass suicide under the mistaken belief that the castle had fallen.

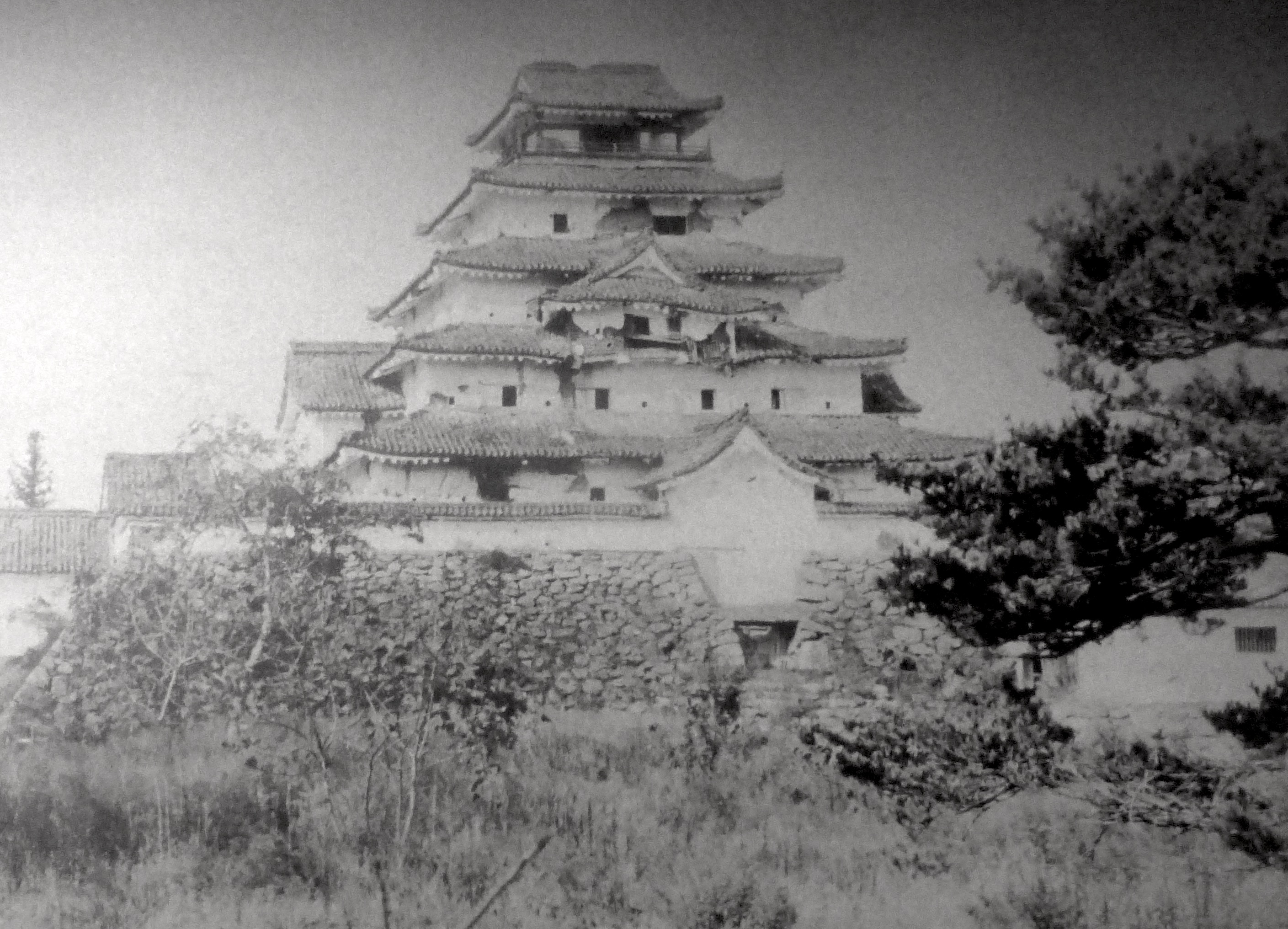
Battered Tsuruga Castle, Aizu, Fukushima (1868).

The 600 women and children inside the castle, led by Matsudaira Teru, formed workgroups to cook, clean, and make gun cartridges, as well as nursing nearly 1,500 wounded soldiers. One of Yamakawa's sisters attempted to join Nakano Takeko's Shōshitai (娘子隊, "Girls' Army"), but on her mother's orders remained inside the castle making gun cartridges. Yamakawa herself, too young for other tasks, carried supplies for the cartridge makers. During the last month of the siege, the castle was bombarded by imperial cannons. A shell exploded in the room where Yamakawa and her family were eating dinner, wounding Yamakawa's neck with shrapnel, and killing her sister-in-law Toseko. In the final days of the siege, Yamakawa's mother sent her and other girls to fly kites as a gesture of defiance while imperial cannons bombarded the castle and the women smothered the shells with wet quilts.

=== After the battle ===
The siege ended with the castle's surrender on November 7, 1868. Yamakawa was taken to a nearby prisoner camp with her mother and sisters, where they were held for a year. In the spring of 1870, they were exiled to the newly created Tonami District (an area that is now part of the Toyama Prefecture). The 17,000 refugees exiled there had no experience of farming, and the winter saw shortages of food, shelter, and firewood which threatened Yamakawa's family with starvation. Yamakawa, turning eleven, spread night soil on the fields and scavenged for shellfish.

In the spring of 1871, Yamakawa was sent to Hakodate, without her family, where she was lodged with Takuma Sawabe and then with French missionaries.

== Education in America ==
=== Departure with the Iwakura Mission ===
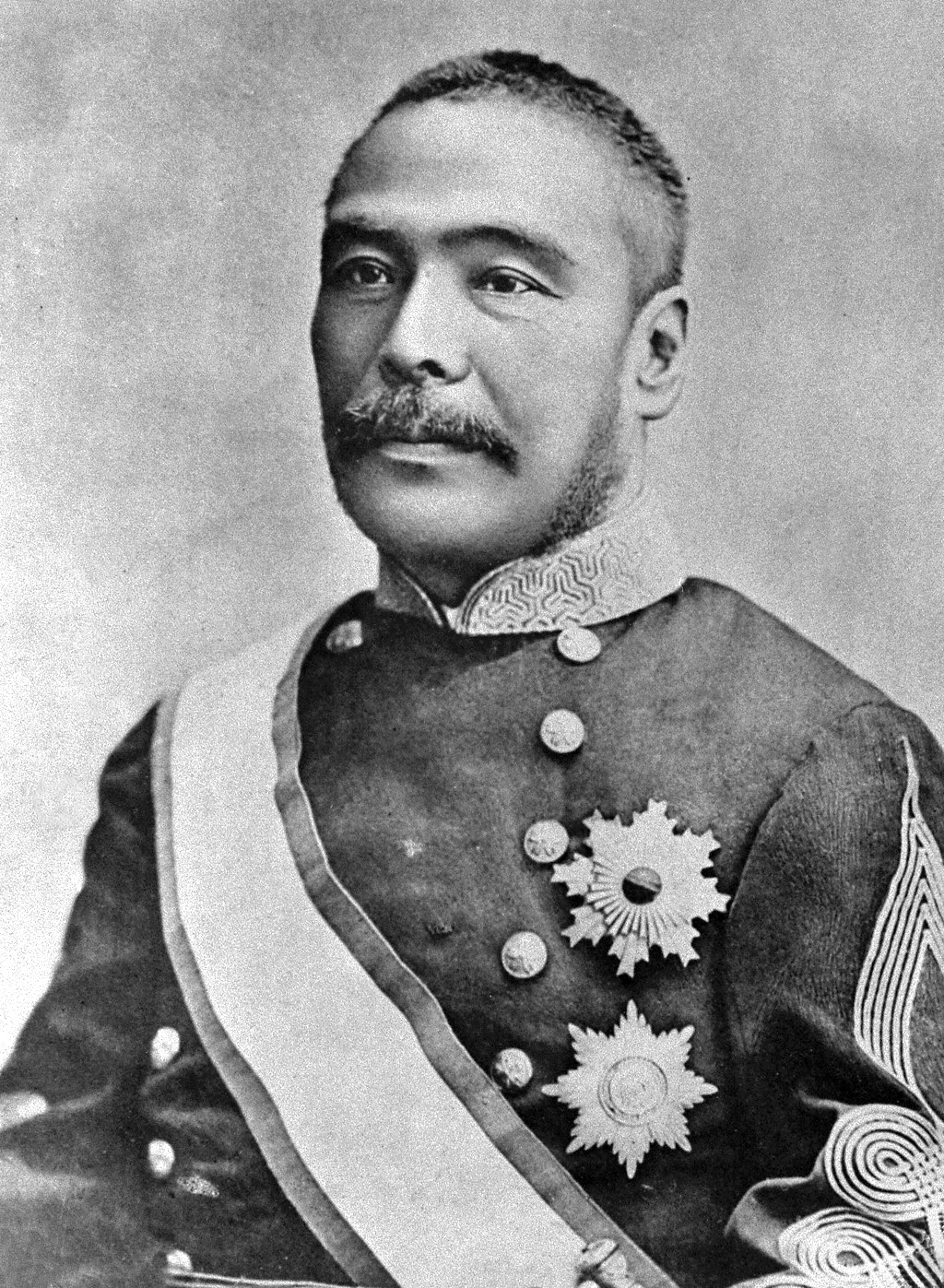
Kiyotaka Kuroda, who arranged to send the girls to study in America

In December 1871, when she was eleven years old, Yamakawa was sent to the United States for study, as part of the Iwakura Mission. Yamakawa was one of five girls sent to spend ten years studying Western ways for the benefit of Japan, after which she was to return and pass on her knowledge to other Japanese women and to her children, in accordance with the Meiji philosophy of "Good Wife, Wise Mother". The other girls were Yoshimasu Ryo (age 14), Ueda Tei (14), Nagai Shige (10) and Tsuda Ume (6). All five girls were from samurai families on the losing side of the Boshin War. The initiative was a "pet project" of Kiyotaka Kuroda, who initially received no applicants in response to his recruitment efforts, despite the funding offered: all the girls' living expenses would be paid for the decade, plus a generous stipend. In response to Kuroda's second call for girls to be educated in America, Yamakawa's eldest brother Hiroshi, acting as head of the household, nominated her. Hiroshi was familiar with Kuroda, since his and Yamakawa's brother Kenjiro had recently left for his own education in America in January 1871, with Kuroda's assistance. Hiroshi may have nominated his sister due to her independent spirit and academic strengths, or out of simple financial need. The five girls chosen were the only applicants.

At this time, Yamakawa's mother changed her given name from Sakiko (咲子) ("little blossom") to Sutematsu (捨松). The meaning of the new name could indicate disappointment that Yamakawa was being sent away from Japan, with the first character meaning discard (捨, sute), as if Yamakawa had been thrown away. But the name could also indicate a positive hope: pine (松, matsu) is one of the Three Friends of Winter which flourish even in harsh conditions, and it sounds like "to wait" (待つ, matsu), suggesting that her mother gave up (捨, sute) her youngest daughter to the government mission while awaiting her safe return.

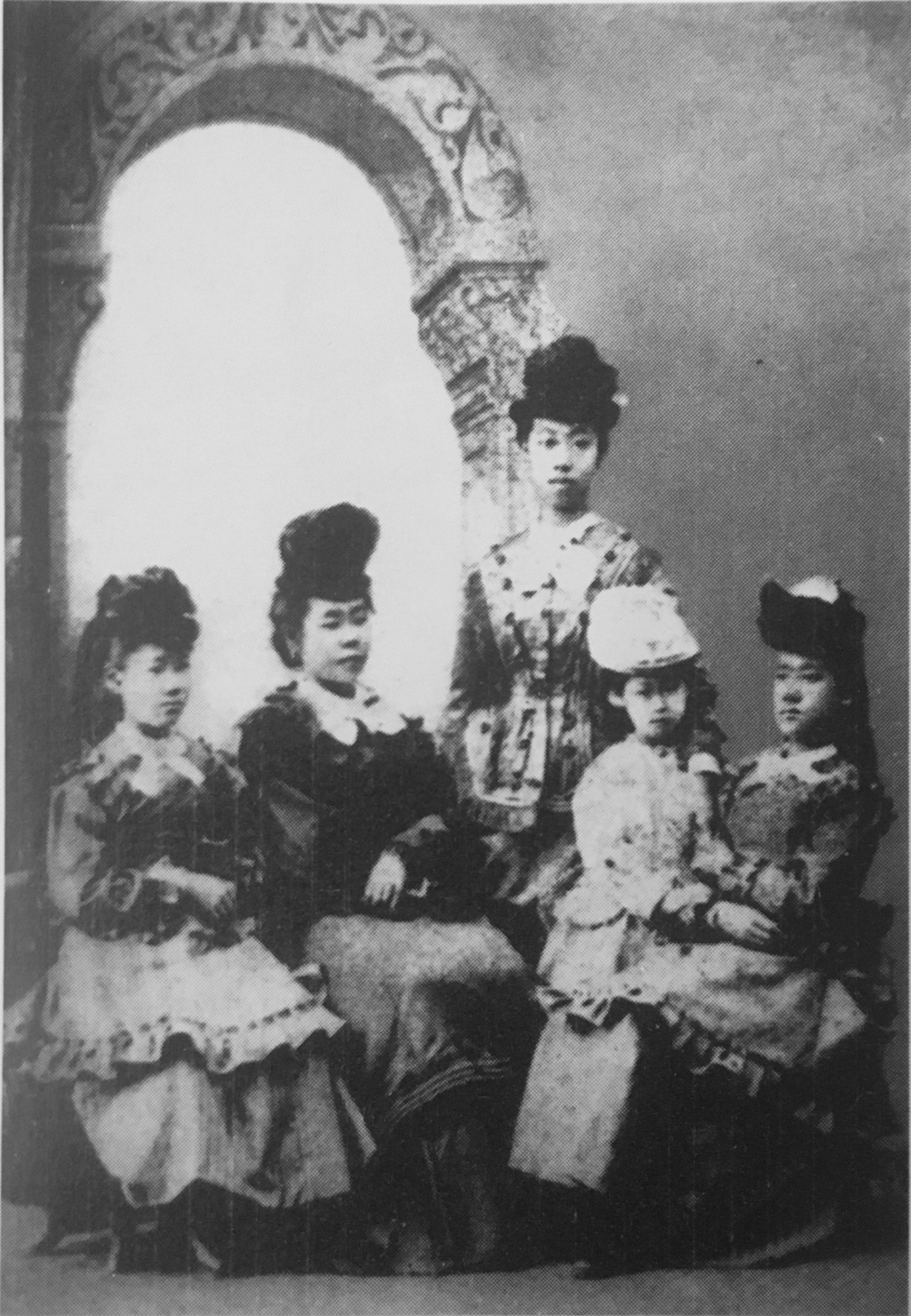
Nagai Shige (age 10), Ueda Tei (14), Yoshimasu Ryo (14), Tsuda Ume (6) and Yamakawa Sutematsu (11), in Chicago, their first time wearing Western clothes.

Before leaving Japan, Yamakawa and the others were the first samurai-class girls to be granted an audience with the Empress Haruko, on November 9, 1871. They departed with the rest of the Iwakura Mission on December 23, 1871, aboard the steamship America, chaperoned by Elida DeLong (wife of the American diplomat Charles E. DeLong), who spoke no Japanese. After a stormy and difficult journey, they arrived in San Francisco on January 15, 1872. Yamakawa and the other girls spent two weeks in San Francisco, largely solitary in their hotel room but the subjects of intense newspaper coverage. Americans typically spelled her name as Stemats Yamagawa, and referred to her and the other girls as "Japanese princesses". After two weeks in San Francisco, the Iwakura Mission embarked on a monthlong cross-country train tour, arriving in Washington, DC on February 29, where Charles Lanman (secretary to Arinori Mori) took custody of the girls. Yamakawa lived briefly with Mrs. Lanman's sister, a Mrs. Hepburn, then in May 1872 all five girls were moved to their own house with a governess, to study English and piano.

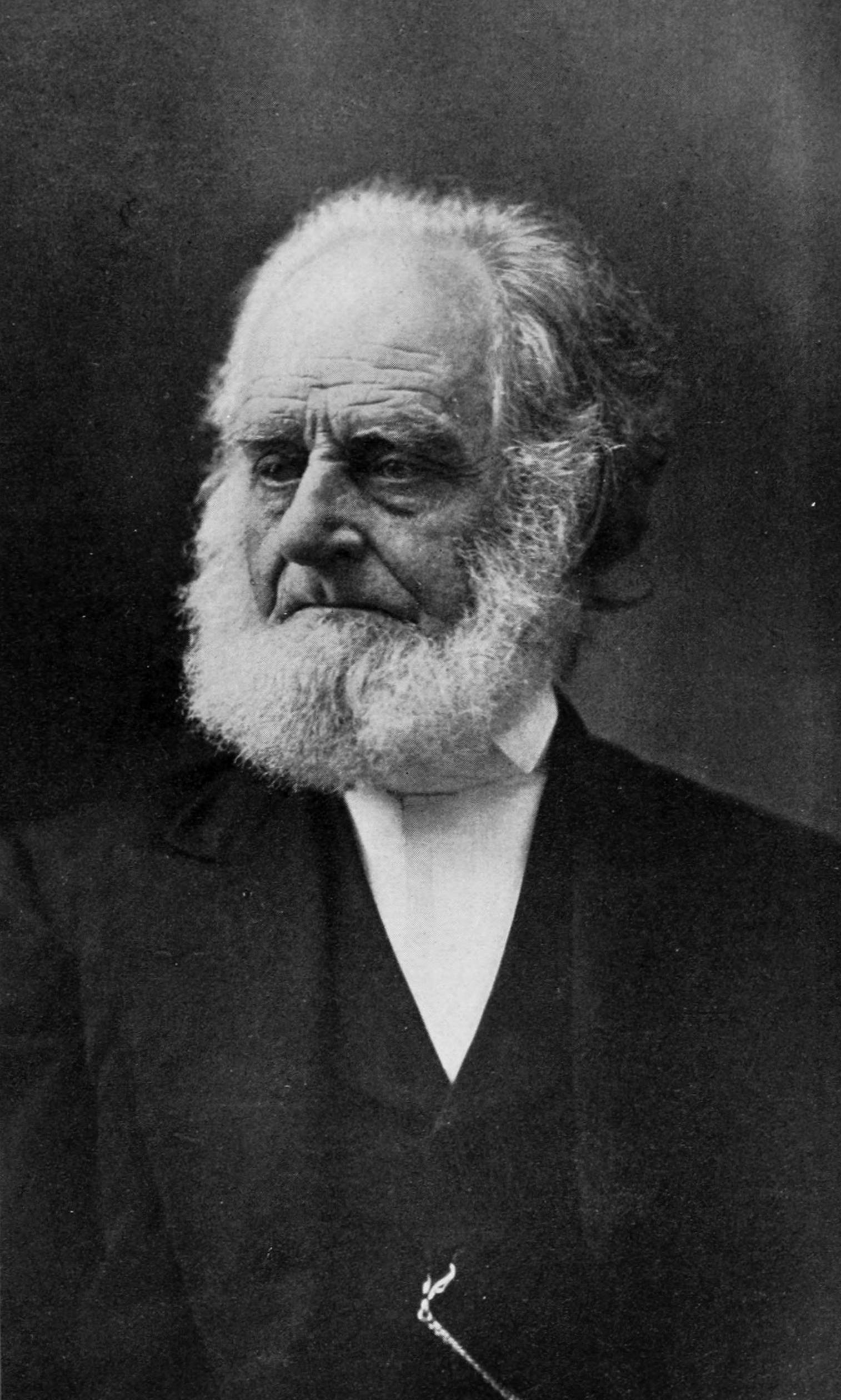
Leonard Bacon, who acted as an adoptive father to Yamakawa for her decade in America.

By October the girls had separated: Yoshimasu and Ueda returned to Japan, Tsuda moved in with the Lanmans, and on October 31, 1872, Nagai and Yamakawa were moved to New Haven, Connecticut. In New Haven, Yamakawa's elder brother Kenjirō was studying at Yale University. To ensure that Nagai and Yamakawa practiced their English, they were placed in separate households, Nagai living with the minister John S. C. Abbott and Yamakawa living with the minister Leonard Bacon. Yamakawa would spend the next ten years as part of the Bacon family, growing particularly close with his youngest daughter of fourteen children, Alice Mabel Bacon. Likely due to the Bacons' influence, Yamakawa converted to Christianity.

Yamakawa attended Grove Hall Seminary, a primary school for girls, with Alice Bacon. In 1875, Yamakawa passed the entrance exam for Hillhouse High School, a prestigious public school, and began her studies there. She attended the 1876 Centennial Exposition in Philadelphia with both Nagai and Tsuda, a rare reunion. In April 1877, Yamakawa graduated from Hillhouse High School.

=== Vassar ===
Yamakawa began her studies at Vassar College in September 1878, the fourteenth year of the still-new women's college. To her regret, the Bacons couldn't afford to send Alice to college, but at Vassar Yamakawa was reunited with Nagai. The two of them were the first nonwhite students at the school, and the first Japanese women to enroll in any college. Nagai enrolled as a special student in the music department, while Yamakawa pursued a full four-year bachelor's degree.

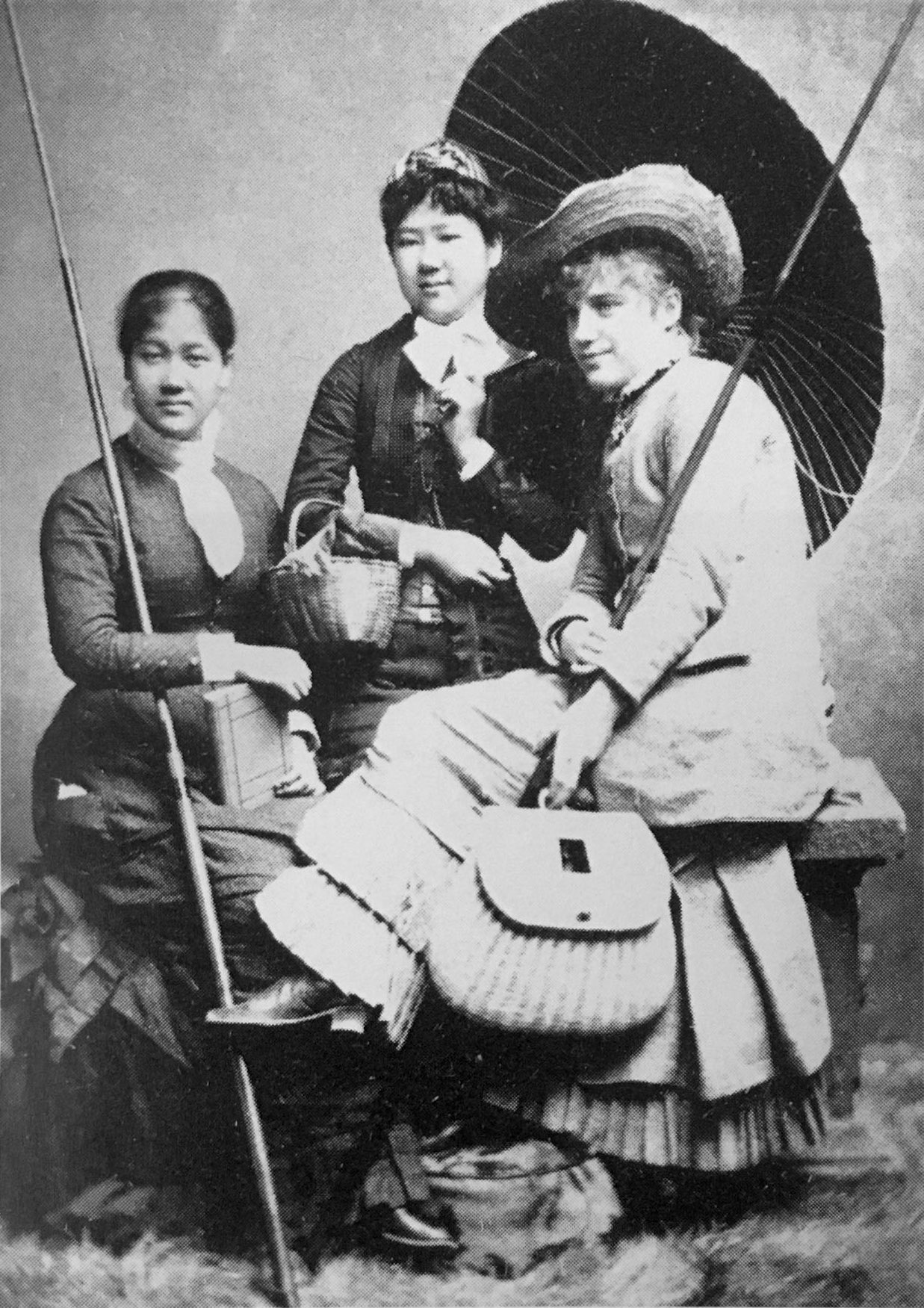
Yamakawa Sutematsu, Nagai Shige, and their friend from Vassar Martha Sharpe.

While at school, Yamakawa began styling her name as Stematz Yamakawa, using the American name order and a spelling which matched the pronunciation of her name. Her teachers included Henry Van Ingen. While she knew Maria Mitchell she did not have her as a teacher. During her time at Vassar, she studied Latin, German, Greek, math, natural history, composition, literature, drawing, chemistry, geology, history, and philosophy. She also mastered chess and whist. Yamakawa was a reserved and ambitious student, whose marks were among the highest in the class. She was also well-liked by her classmates. Around this time, Yamakawa's sister Misao moved from Japan to Russia; Misao wrote letters in French to Yamakawa, which Yamakawa's classmates translated and helped her reply to. Yamakawa was elected class president for 1879, and invited to join the literary club of the Shakespeare Society, which was "reserved for students of formidable intellect." In 1880, she was a marshal for the college's Founder's Day celebration. In June 1881, Nagai returned to Japan. The ten-year period of the girls' educational mission had ended, but Yamakawa extended her stay to complete her degree. In her senior year, she was named president of the Philalethean Society, the largest social organization at Vassar. Whilst at Vassar she also became friends with actress and novelist Louise Jordan Miln who visited her in Tokyo on her travels to the Far East in the 1890s.

Yamakawa graduated from Vassar College with a B.A., magna cum laude, on June 14, 1882. Her thesis was on "British Foreign Policy Toward Japan", and she was chosen to give a commencement speech on the topic at her class's graduation. (Note: Yamakawa is sometimes described as having been valedictorian of her class, but this may not be accurate. She was one of ten students chosen to give a valedictory speech on her thesis, and ranked third in her class overall.) After graduation, Yamakawa studied nursing at the Connecticut Training School For Nurses in New Haven in July and August. She and Tsuda (who had also extended her stay, to complete a high school degree) finally departed for Japan in October 1882. They travelled by rail to San Francisco, whence they left aboard the steamship Arabic on October 31. After a rough three-week journey across the Pacific, Yamakawa arrived in Yokohama on November 20, 1882.

== Marriage and family ==
When she first returned to Japan, Yamakawa looked for educational or government work, but her options were limited, especially because she could not read or write Japanese. Yamakawa initially expressed in her letters a resolution to remain unmarried and pursue an intellectual life, turning down at least three proposals. As she struggled to find work, however, she wrote that Japanese culture made marriage necessary, and gave more serious consideration to her suitors.

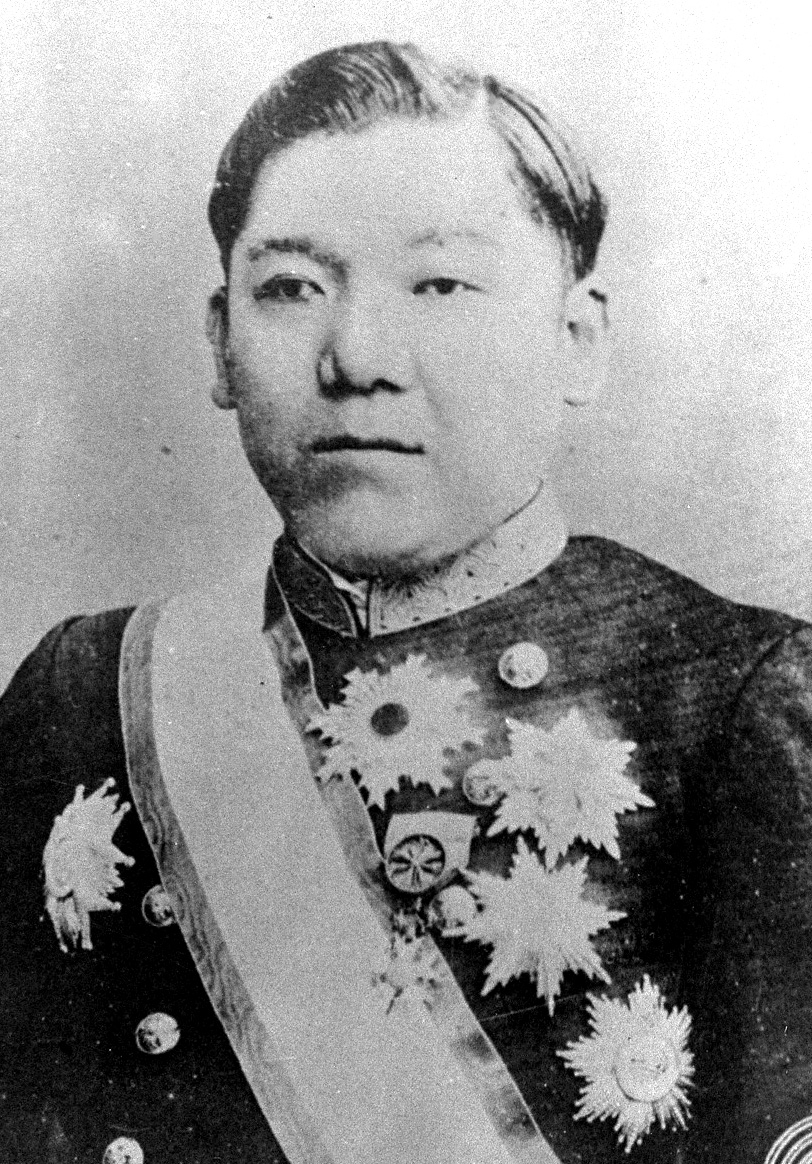
Ōyama Iwao in his middle age. (Note: Image source: Rekidai Shusho tou Shashin, call no.:Constitutional Government Documents Collection, #1142; Monochrome, 15.1×20.2 cm)

In January 1882, Yamakawa wrote to Alice Bacon that one of the marriage proposals she had declined was from someone "I might have married for money and position but I resisted the temptation," whom she later revealed to have been Ōyama Iwao. At this time, Ōyama was 40 years old, with three young daughters from a first marriage which had just ended with his wife's death in childbirth. He was also a wealthy and important general in the Imperial Japanese Army who had lived in Europe for three years, spoke French, and sought an intelligent and cosmopolitan wife. As a former Satsuma retainer, his military activity included serving as an artilleryman during the bombardment of Yamakawa's hometown of Aizu. He later liked to joke that Yamakawa had made the bullet which struck him during that battle.

In February 1882, Yamakawa played Portia in an amateur production of the final two acts of The Merchant of Venice at a large party, which inspired Iwao to repeat his proposal. This time, he sent a formal request to her brothers, who were shocked. They immediately rejected him on Yamakawa's behalf because, as a Satsuma man, he was an enemy of Yamakawa's Aizu family. After several personal visits from Tsugumichi Saigo, a ranking Satsuma leader, Yamakawa's brothers were persuaded to let her decide. In April 1882, Yamakawa decided to accept him. They married in a small ceremony on November 8, 1883. At her marriage, Yamakawa became known as Ōyama Sutematsu or Madame Ōyama.

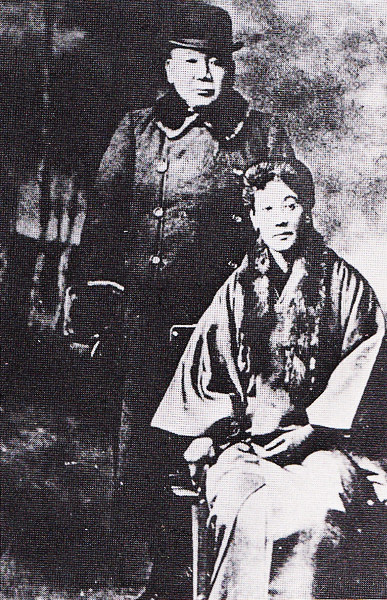
Ōyama Iwao and Ōyama Sutematsu in their later years

Ōyama Iwao left Japan to study Prussian military systems early in 1884, relieving Ōyama Sutematsu of the social duties of a minister's wife for the year he was away. In July 1884, the Peerage Act of 1884 made them Count and Countess Ōyama. Ōyama Iwao left Japan again in 1894, at the head of Japan's Second Army, for the First Sino-Japanese War. When the war concluded eight months later, the American press credited Ōyama Sutematsu's influence for Japan's superiority to China. (Note: An article in The New York Times commented as follows: "Through Japan, China must soon give way to civilization, and when she does who can say that Uncle Sam has not materially aided in the result? ... Mme. Oyama has exerted a wide influence, and undoubtedly helped on the progressive spirit." qtd. in Nimura, 2015.) After the war, Ōyama Iwao was promoted, and the couple became Marquess and Marchioness Ōyama. Ōyama Iwao served again in the Russo-Japanese War beginning in 1904, commanding troops in Manchuria. At the end of the war in 1905, his rank was raised again, to Prince, and Ōyama Sutematsu finally became the "Japanese princess" which the American newspapers had once mistakenly called her, with her title becoming Princess Ōyama. In 1915, the Ōyamas attended the enthronement of Emperor Taishō and received a memorial badge as guests to the ceremony of accession.

During the Ōyamas' marriage, they had two daughters, Hisako (born November 1884, later Baroness Ida Hisako) and Nagako (born prematurely in 1887, lived only two days), and two sons, Takashi (winter 1886 – April 1908) and Kashiwa (born June 1889). Ōyama Sutematsu was also a step-mother to Ōyama Iwao's three daughters from his first marriage: Nobuko (c. 1876 – May 1896) and two younger girls. Despite the fact that Ōyama Sutematsu was not motivated by love when she accepted Ōyama Iwao's proposal, her biographer Janice P. Nimura calls their marriage "unusually happy", with Ōyama Sutematsu as the intellectual equal and helpmeet of her husband.

=== Depiction in The Cuckoo ===
Beginning in 1898, a personal tragedy in Ōyama's household became the subject of a bestselling novel, in which Ōyama was depicted as a wicked stepmother. Kenjirō Tokutomi's novel The Cuckoo (不如帰, Hototogisu) is based on the marriage and death of Ōyama Nobuko, one of Ōyama Iwao's daughters with his first wife. Ōyama Nobuko married Mishima Yatarō in 1893, a love match which also united two powerful families. The winter after their marriage, Nobuko became ill with tuberculosis. Mishima's mother insisted that he divorce her, on the grounds that Nobuko would no longer be healthy enough to bear the heir which was necessary for an only son. Although Mishima felt that the divorce was wrong, Nobuko's parents agreed to a divorce while Nobuko was being nursed in the countryside, and the marriage was dissolved in the fall of 1895. Nobuko was moved back to her parents' house in Tokyo, where they built a new wing of their house for her to prevent transmission of the illness. Ōyama Sutematsu was the subject of unsympathetic gossip for isolating her stepdaughter, which was seen as a punishing exile. Nobuko died in May 1896, age twenty.

Tokutomi published his story based on these events in the newspaper Kokumin shinbun from November 1898 to May 1899. Tokutomi revised the story, and published it as a standalone book in 1900, which is when it became one of the most successful novels at the time, a major bestseller popular across many social groups for its elegant language and tear-jerking scenes. The novel is "most often remembered as a novel that protests the victimization of women, particularly the victimization of young brides," blaming the Meiji era family system known as ie for the tragedy. In presenting this moral, the novel depicts the young couple in idealized terms, and is moderately sympathetic toward the character based on Ōyama Iwao, but demonizes the characters based on Mishima's mother and on Ōyama Sutematsu. Ōyama Sutematsu's character is presented as jealous of her own stepdaughter, and a corrupting Western influence in her family.

== Promotion of women's education and nursing ==
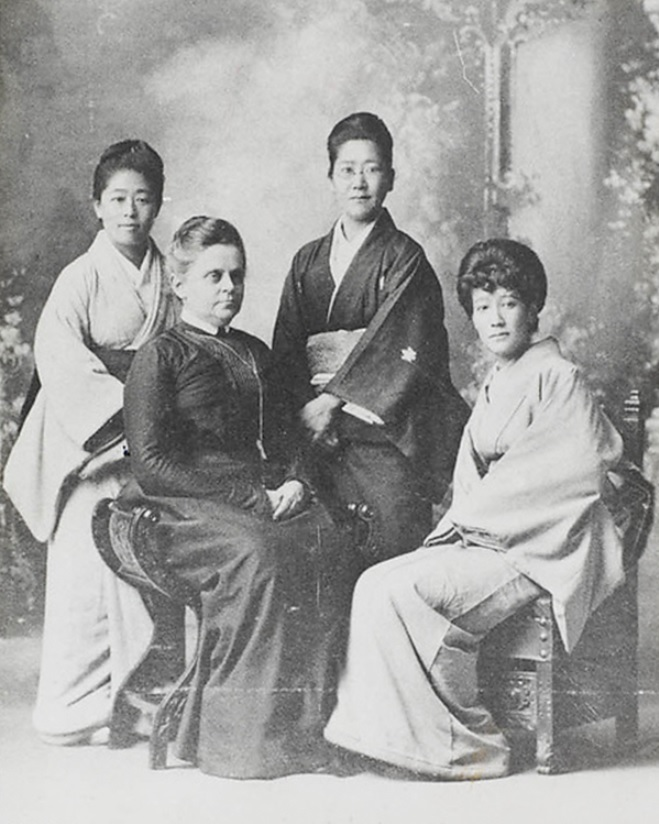
Tsuda Ume, Alice Mabel Bacon, Uryū Shige, and Ōyama Sutematsu (from left to right), c. 1901.

After her marriage, Ōyama took on the social responsibilities of a government official's wife, and advised the Empress on western customs, holding the official title of "Advisor on Westernization in the Court". She also advocated for women's education and encouraged upper-class Japanese women to volunteer as nurses. She frequently hosted American visitors to advance Japanese-American relations, including Alice Bacon, the geographer Ellen Churchill Semple and the novelist Fannie Caldwell Macaulay. In 1888, Ōyama was the subject of negative press from Japanese conservatives, and withdrew somewhat from public life. Positive press in 1895, at the conclusion of the First Sino-Japanese War (in which her husband had military victories and she had philanthropic success), returned her to the public eye.

=== Education ===
Ōyama assisted Tsuda and Hirobumi Ito in establishing the Peeresses' School in Tokyo for high-ranking ladies, which opened on October 5, 1885. It was overseen by the new minister of education, Arinori Mori, who had frequently met with the girls of the Iwakura Mission while in America. In its first years, the school was a relatively conservative institution, where aristocratic students dressed in formal court dress and studied Japanese, Chinese literature, English or French, and history alongside the less academic subjects of morals, calligraphy, drawing, sewing, tea ceremony, flower arrangement, household management, and formal etiquette. From 1888 to 1889, Alice Bacon joined the school as an English teacher. At this point, the school began requiring Western dress for students.

In 1900, she was a co-founder with Bacon and Tsuda Ume of the Women's Home School of English (or Joshi Eigaku Juku), to teach advanced studies and progressive Western ideals in English. At that time, women's only option for advanced study was the Women's Higher Normal School in Tokyo, which taught in Japanese and provided a more conservative curriculum. While Tsuda and Bacon worked as teachers, Ōyama served as a patron of the school.

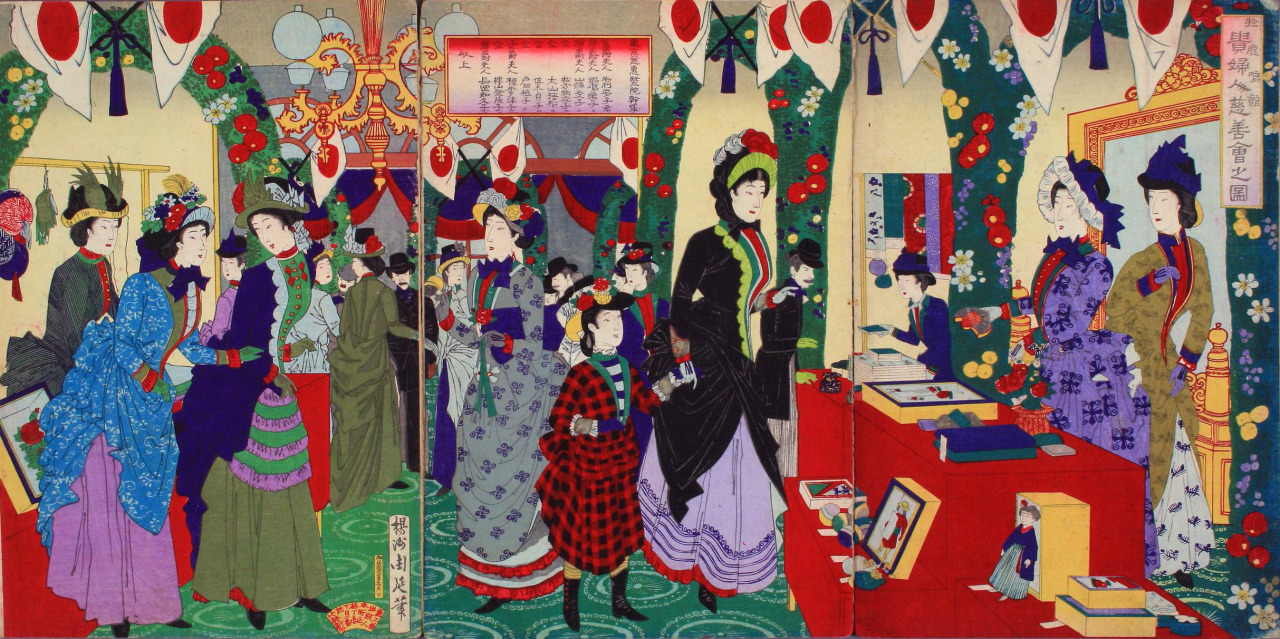
Countess Ōyama Sutematsu and her daughter Ōyama Hisako at the first fundraising bazaar for Takaki Kanehiro's Tokyo Jikei iin (東京慈恵医院), 1887. Yamakawa discussed with Takaki the founding of training course and increase female healthcare workers, which would become Jikei Kango semmon gakko (慈恵看護専門学校). (Note: Organizers' names are printed at the top center of this triptich, with Mōri Yasuko, Nabeshima Eiko, Yamagata Aritomo's second partner Sadako, Sasaki Takayuki's wife Sadako, Toda Wakako, Enomoto Tazuko, Kabayama Toshiko, and Nagano Wakuko.)

=== Philanthropy ===
Ōyama also promoted the idea of philanthropy (not a typical part of aristocratic Japanese life) to high-ranking Japanese ladies. In 1884, she hosted the first charity bazaar in Japan, raising funds for Tokyo's new Charity Hospital. Despite skepticism of the concept in the Japanese press, and suggestions that the activity was not ladylike, the bazaar was a financial success and became an annual event.

In addition to promoting monetary charity, Ōyama was active in volunteer nursing. She was Director of the Ladies Relief Association and the Ladies Volunteer Nursing Association, President of the Ladies Patriotic Association, and Chairman of the Japanese Red Cross Society. At the outbreak of the First Sino-Japanese War in 1894, she formed a committee of sixty aristocratic ladies to raise funds and gather supplies for the troops. Ōyama herself rolled bandages for the Red Cross during this war, and worked again as a volunteer nurse during the Russo-Japanese War from 1904 to 1905.

== Death and legacy ==
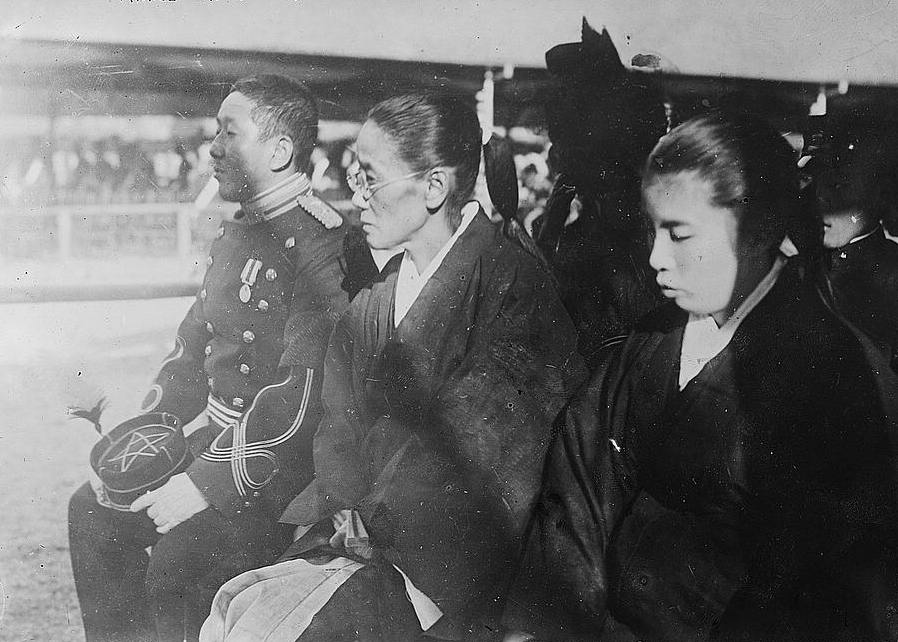
Ōyama Sutematsu (center) at Ōyama Iwao's funeral, with her stepson Ōyama Kashiwa left and his wife Takeko right.

At Ōyama Iwao's death on December 10, 1916, Ōyama Sutematsu made her final retreat from public life, retiring to live in their son Kashiwa's household. She was not involved with the Red Cross during World War I. When the 1918 flu pandemic reached Tokyo in early 1919, Ōyama sent her family to the countryside in Nasushiobara, but remained in Tokyo herself to oversee the Women's Home School of English (Joshi Eigaku Juku) and seek a replacement president after Tsuda's retirement. She fell ill on February 6, and died of related pneumonia on February 18, 1919.

Ōyama has been the subject of two biographies. The first, Unexpected Destinations: The Poignant Story of Japan's First Vassar Graduate, was written by her great-granddaughter Akiko Kuno. It was first published in Japan in 1988, with the title Rokumeikan no kifujin Ōyama Sutematsu: Nihon hatsu no joshi ryūgakusei (The Lady of the Rokumeikan, Ōyama Sutematsu: Japan's First Female Study Abroad Student), and the Japanese edition was a bestseller. An English edition translated by Kirsten McIvor was published in 1993. The biography includes material from forty letters written by Ōyama to Alice Bacon.

The second book telling the story of Ōyama's life is Daughters of the Samurai: A Journey from East to West and Back, written by Janice P. Nimura and published in 2015. This biography discusses Ōyama alongside Shige Nagai and Ume Tsuda, who were also educated in America as part of the Iwakura mission. In addition to Ōyama's letters to Bacon, it includes information from Tsuda's letters to her foster mother Adeline Lanman, as well as published material such as Bacon's memoir and Ōyama's essays.

== Gallery ==
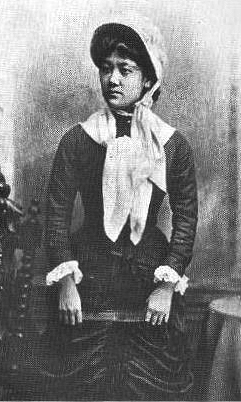
Yamakawa Sutematsu at Vassar

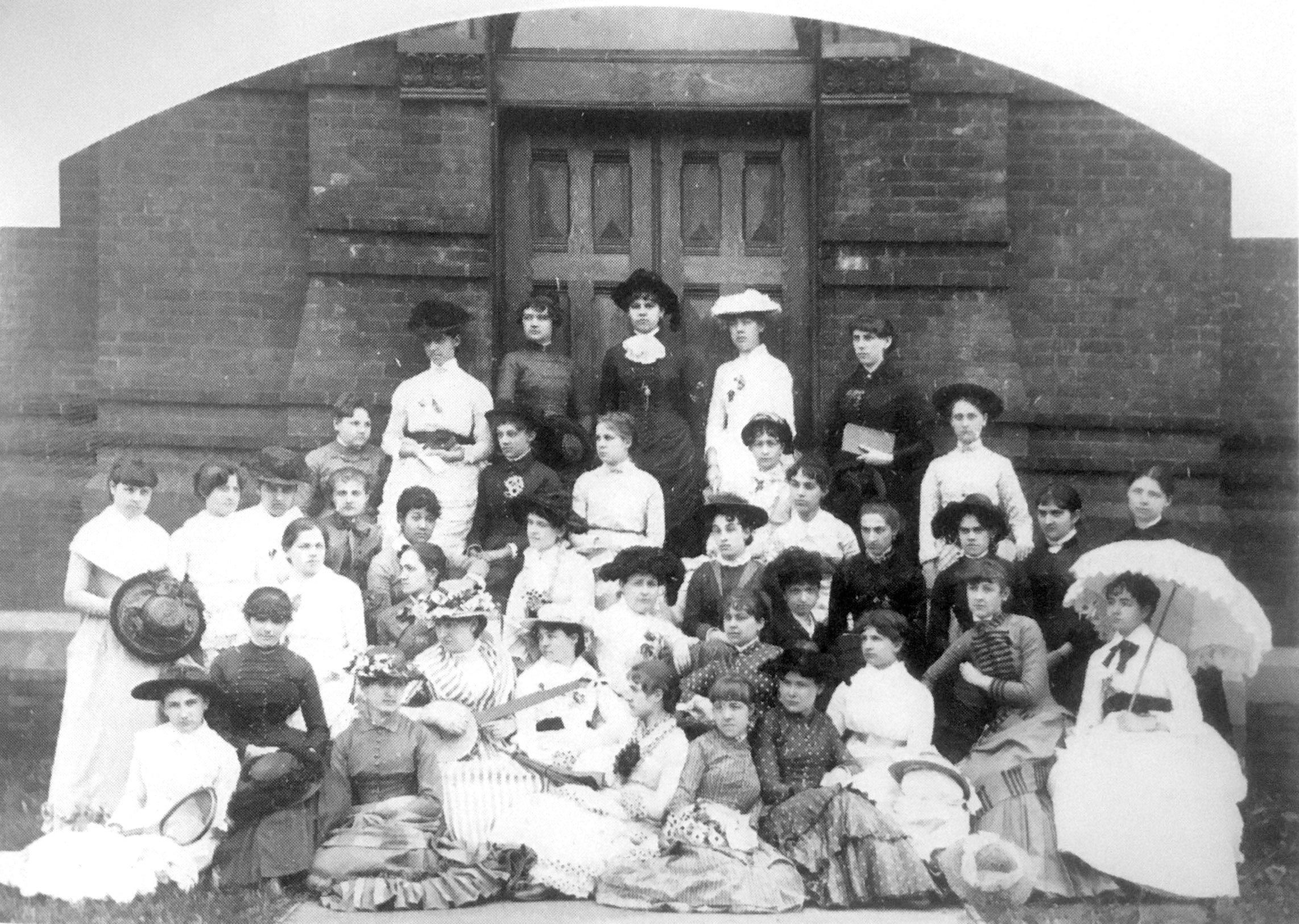
The Vassar College Class of 1882. Yamakawa Sutematsu is in the third-to-last row, fifth from the left.

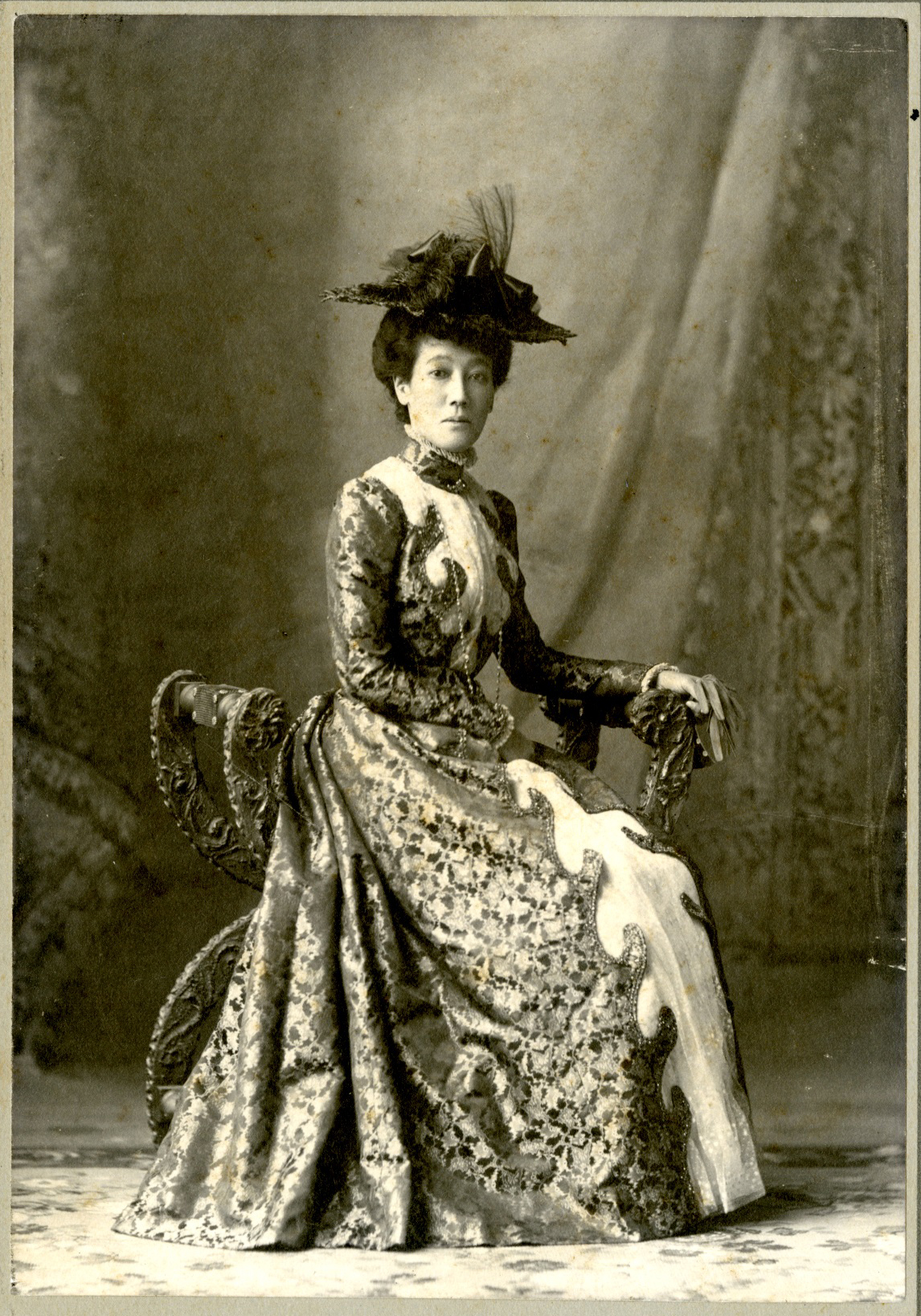
Marchioness Ōyama, c. 1888

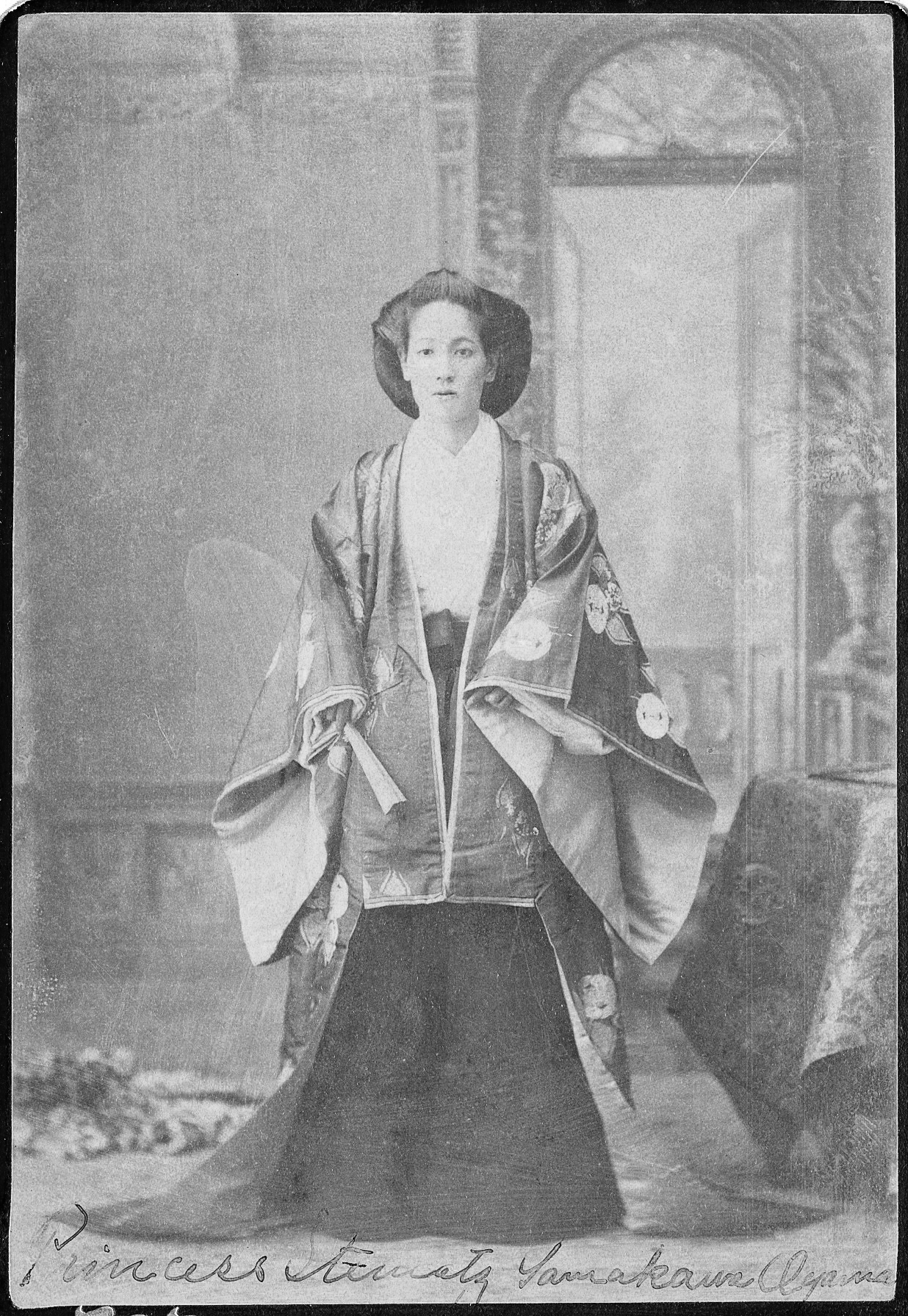
Ōyama Sutematsu in formal court kimono attire of jūnihitoe, 1883

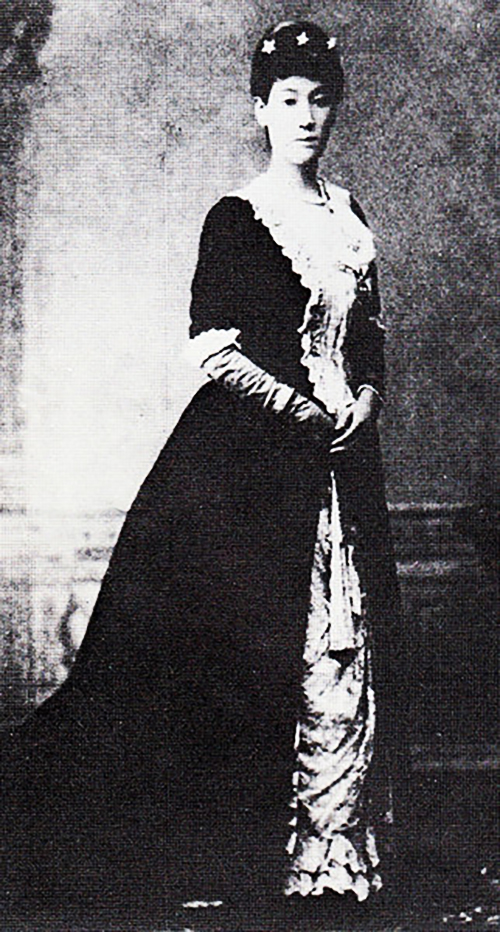
Ōyama Sutematsu in evening dress, 1888

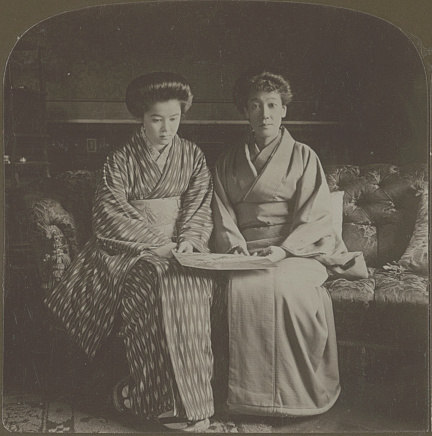
Marchioness Oyama and her daughter, drawing-room of the Oyama home, 1906

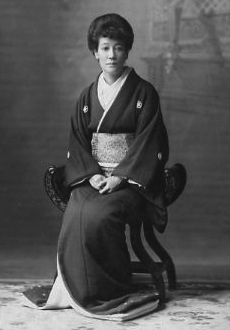
Ōyama Sutematsu c. 1900

== Bibliography ==
=== General references ===
- Adams, Ellen E. (2014). "Colonial Geographies, Imperial Romances: Travels in Japan with Ellen Churchill Semple and Fannie Caldwell Macaulay". The Journal of the Gilded Age and Progressive Era. 13 (2): 145–165. doi:10.1017/S153778141400005X. ISSN 1537-7814. S2CID 162725018.
- Benesch, Oleg; Zwigenberg, Ran (2019). Japan's Castles: Citadels of Modernity in War and Peace. Cambridge University Press. p. 28. ISBN 978-1-108-48194-6.
- "Chinese symbols" (PDF). British Museum.
- Finkel, Laura (2009). "Guide to the Sutematsu Yamakawa Oyama Papers, 1872–1983 (bulk 1882–1919)". specialcollections.vassar.edu. Archives & Special Collections Library at Vassar College. Archived from the original on October 18, 2019.
- Howe, Sondra Weland (1995). "The Role of Women in the Introduction of Western Music in Japan". The Bulletin of Historical Research in Music Education. 16 (2): 81–97. doi:10.1177/153660069501600201. ISSN 0739-5639. JSTOR 40214860. S2CID 157827079.
- Ito, Ken K. (2000). "The Family and the Nation in Tokutomi Roka's Hototogisu". Harvard Journal of Asiatic Studies. 60 (2): 489–536. doi:10.2307/2652633. ISSN 0073-0548. JSTOR 2652633.
- Iwasaki, Sodo (1903). 明治大臣の夫人 [Wives of Ministers in Meiji Government（岩崎徂堂）] (in Japanese). Daigakukan. p. 11. doi:10.11501/778815.
- Kuno, Akiko (1993). Unexpected Destinations: The Poignant Story of Japan's First Vassar Graduate. Kodansha International.
- Ministry of Finance (1974). "Insignia and medals - list of main metal products". Centennial history of the mint. Japan National Mint.
- Nimura, Janice P (2015). Daughters of the Samurai: A Journey from East to West and Back. New York: W. W. Norton & Company. ISBN 978-0-393-07799-5. OCLC 891611002.
- "Picture 2, Oyama, Iwao (1842 - 1916): Categories:Alphabetical Order:O; Portraits of Modern Japanese Historical Figures". National Diet Library.
- "Princess Oyama". Vassar Encyclopedia. Vassar College.
- Sase, Suibai (1900). 当世活人画 : 一名・名士と閨秀 (Tōsei katujinga: meishi to keishu) [The Modern Portraits: individual gentlemen and their accomplished ladies] (in Japanese). Vol. ２ (続). Sase, Tokuzō 佐瀬得三; 佐瀬酔梅. Tokyo: Shunyōdō. doi:10.11501/778426. JPNO 40016403.
- Wright, Diana E. (2001). "Female Combatants and Japan's Meiji Restoration: The Case of Aizu". War in History. 8 (4): 396–417. doi:10.1177/096834450100800402. S2CID 59479387.
- 会津戊辰戦史編纂会 編 (1933). Yamakawa, Kenjiro (ed.). "会津戊辰戦史" [History of Boshin War in Aizu]. National Diet Library (in Japanese). Tokyo, Japan: 会津戊辰戦史編纂会 (Aizu Boshin Senshi Hensan-kai). 0006.js (left). doi:10.11501/1921057. JPNO 53010833 (identifier:NDLJP): info:ndljp/pid/1921057. Thumbnail URL: https://dl.ndl.go.jp/info:ndljp/pid/1921057.
