= Unexpected Destinations =

1993 biography of Ōyama Sutematsu

- Author: Akiko Kuno
- Translator: Kirsten McIvor
- Published: 1988 (Japanese)
- Publisher: Chūō kōronsha (Japanese), Kodansha International (English)
- English publication date: 1993
- Pages: 246 (English)

Unexpected Destinations: The Poignant Story of Japan's First Vassar Graduate is a biography of Ōyama Sutematsu, written by her great-granddaughter Akiko Kuno. Ōyama was one of the first Japanese women to study abroad after the end of Japan's closed borders, and the first Japanese woman to earn a university degree. (Note: Kuno describes Ōyama as the first Japanese woman to get a specifically American college degree. Ōyama's later biographer Janice P. Nimura, in her book Daughters of the Samurai, now identifies this as the first college degree of any kind earned by a Japanese woman.) After a horizon-expanding adolescence in New Haven, Connecticut in the 1870s, Ōyama returned to Japan and struggled to reconcile her intellectual ambitions with Japan's social expectations for women. She married a high-ranking military officer and used her social position to quietly promote women's education and positive international relations after the end of Japan's isolationist sakoku period.

Kuno's biography is based on a research trip across America in 1982, and includes information from forty letters written by Ōyama to her foster-sister Alice Bacon. Kuno highlights both the value and the personal costs of studying abroad, making connections between her great-grandmother's experience and her own formative years in the United States. Kuno also lightly criticizes the constraints placed on women by Japanese society. The biography was first published in Japan in 1988, with an English translation in 1993. The Japanese edition was a bestseller.

== Synopsis ==
The book begins with a preface and a description of the author's research process, before presenting a chronological account of Ōyama Sutematsu's life. She was born Yamakawa Sakiko in 1860, and narrowly survived the Battle of Aizu in late 1868. At age eleven, she was one of five Japanese girls sent to be educated in America as part of the Iwakura Mission, in support of the new imperial government's program of rapid modernization. She was placed with the family of Leonard Bacon in New Haven, Connecticut, where she was embraced as one of the family. Her childhood play was athletic and tomboyish. As she grew, she enjoyed substantial academic success in high school and at Vassar College, where she accomplished an important "first" for Japanese women by earning a college degree. After ten years, the time came for her to return to Japan, where she found that Japanese society was not as welcoming of an independent, intellectual, Westernized woman as the imperial educational program had expected. More fluent in English than in Japanese, she struggled with the options available to her. Eventually, she married a high-ranking military officer (Ōyama Iwao), adopting his children from a prior marriage and having several of her own. For the rest of her life, she supported women's education from behind the scenes, and balanced public causes with the demands of private family life. These later years include her involvement in the Westernized aristocratic social circles of the Rokumeikan; a visit from her foster-sister Alice Bacon; a family scandal that became the subject of the best-selling novel The Cuckoo; her husband's involvement in the Russo-Japanese War; and her final withdrawal from public life after her husband's death in 1916. Ōyama died in 1919 at the age of sixty, with her final act being the installation of a new principal for the school which eventually became Tsuda University. Kuno closes the book with a brief expression of regret that aristocratic life stifled Ōyama's personality and ambitions.

In presenting her great-grandmother's life story, Kuno often discusses the broader ideas of international education, US-Japan relations, and the social roles of women. Kuno uses her and her ancestor's shared experience of studying abroad in America to argue for the value of foreign study, and to present the personal costs it can carry. News coverage during Ōyama's lifetime emphasized the glamour of her aristocratic life, leaving her better-known as Iwao's wife than as an individual. Kuno thus provides a different view of her by highlighting the value of her education and its effect on diplomatic relations. The book also indicates some of Ōyama's frustration that, after sacrificing so much to become educated for Japan's benefit, her status as a woman in Japan only allowed her to use that education indirectly through subtle social influence. Ōyama is presented as a talented woman who is constrained by society and unable to fully express those talents.

== Author ==
Akiko Kuno was born in Shinagawa, Tokyo. Kuno, her mother, and her grandmother all travelled abroad, in keeping with the international educational mission of Kuno's great-grandmother Ōyama. Kuno's grandmother was raised by Ōyama to speak fluent English, and lived in London with her banker husband from 1904 to 1908. Kuno's mother studied in America during the Great Depression, first at Hope College in Michigan and then at the American Conservatory of Music in Chicago, Illinois. Kuno earned a B.A. in American history from Keio University in 1964. As an undergraduate, she participated in Keio's summer exchange program with Stanford University, followed by a year at Hope College, where her mother had also studied.

Rather than marrying after her degree, Kuno worked for the 1964 Summer Olympic Games organizing committee, which allowed her to travel the world with the torch relay team. She worked as the secretary for the president of the International Olympic Committee, then worked with the Ohio State Tokyo Trade Office, which she helped establish in 1968. At age 31, she married; following social expectations, she stopped working after the birth of her son. She moved temporarily to Paris due to her husband's work. She volunteered with the College Women's Association of Japan (CWAJ), where she served as president in the mid-1980s. Following her time with CWAJ, she served as the executive director and then the vice president of the America-Japan Society, both times being the first woman to occupy the role.

== Research ==
Akiko Kuno began to research her great-grandmother's life in 1980. A friend, Nucy Meech, was interested in the first Japanese woman to graduate from an American university; on learning that it was Kuno's own relative, Meech contacted Vassar College for more information, and the office of Alumni and Alumnae of Vassar College (AAVC) sent Kuno several newspaper articles about Ōyama. After placing an advertisement in Vassar Quarterly seeking information, Kuno found that many papers from Ōyama's foster family the Bacons were available at Yale University, and that her letters to Alice Bacon had been preserved by Bacon's descendant Jill Bryant. Kuno travelled to San Francisco in July 1982, and visited several stops from Ōyama's journey with the Iwakura Mission, using Kume Kunitake's published diary Beio Kairan Jikki as her guide. She consulted materials in several libraries in San Francisco; New Haven, Connecticut; Poughkeepsie, New York; and New Brunswick, New Jersey. Kuno interviewed Alice Bacon's nephew Alfred Bacon, and Jill Bryant provided copies of forty letters from Ōyama to Alice Bacon.

== Publication and reception ==
The book was first published by Chūō kōronsha in Japan in 1988, under the title Rokumeikan no kifujin Ōyama Sutematsu: Nihon hatsu no joshi ryūgakusei (The Lady of the Rokumeikan, Ōyama Sutematsu: Japan's First Female Study Abroad Student). The Japanese version was a bestseller; at least five editions were published, including a 1993 bunkobon paperback. A review in The Asahi Shimbun praised the book's expression of Ōyama's vivid personality, especially her "teeth-grinding frustration" (歯ぎしりするような苛立ち) with the limitations she encountered as a woman.

An English edition translated by Kirsten McIvor was published by Kodansha International in 1993. The English translation was reviewed in Publishers Weekly, Kirkus, and Library Journal. These reviews primarily praise the inherent interest of the topic. The review in Kirkus was lukewarm, criticizing that the book "only hints at the implications and pathos of Sutematsu's story"; it concludes that "Sutematsu and her brave companions deserve more, but this is at least a long overdue beginning." Library Journal concludes: "This book's value lies in its illumination of a little-known chapter of Japan's modern history." An article in Vassar Quarterly also praised the historical interest of Ōyama's story.

== See also ==
- Daughters of the Samurai
