= Yamakawa =

Yamakawa (characters for "mountain" and "river") may refer to:

- Yamakawa, Tokushima, town in Oe District, Tokushima
- Yamakawa, Fukuoka, town in Yamato District, Fukuoka
- 8923 Yamakawa, asteroid

== People with the surname ==
- Erika Yamakawa (山川 恵里佳; born 1982), Japanese female talent
- Yamakawa Futaba (山川 二葉; 1844–1909), Japanese educator
- Baron Yamakawa Hiroshi (山川 浩; 1845–1898), samurai, politician and educator
- Hitoshi Yamakawa (山川 均; 1880–1958), Japanese socialist
- Hotaka Yamakawa (山川 穂高; born 1991), Japanese professional baseball player
- Junichi Yamakawa (山川 純一), the author of Kuso Miso Technique
- Keiichi Yamakawa (山川 恵一), Japanese producer of Romance of Darkness
- Kenichi Yamakawa (山川 健一; born 1953), Japanese author and rock musician
- Baron Yamakawa Kenjirō (山川 健次郎; 1854–1931), Japanese physicist, university president, and author
- Yamakawa Kikue (山川 菊栄; 1890–1980), Japanese socialist and feminist
- Maki Yamakawa, Japanese fashion model and radio personality, director of Kekko Kamen
- Uraji Yamakawa (山川 浦路; 1885–1947), Japanese actress
- Yutaka Yamakawa (山川 豊; born 1958), Japanese Enka singer
