= Footprints in the Snow =

Novel by Kenjirō Tokutomi

- Cover of English translation
- Author: Kenjirō Tokutomi
- Original title: 思出の記 (Omoide no Ki)
- Set in: Japan, 1878–1897
- Publication date: 1900–1901
- Publication place: Japan
- English publication date: 1970

Footprints in the Snow (思出の記, Omoide no Ki) is a Japanese novel by Kenjirō Tokutomi. Originally serialized in the newspaper Kokumin Shimbun between 1900 and 1901, the novel was later revised and published as a book in 1901. It can be considered a semi-autobiographical coming-of-age story as it blends fiction with events from Tokutomi's youth and that of his older brother, Tokutomi Soho. The book became a bestseller and established Tokutomi as a writer following his earlier success with The Cuckoo.

== Plot ==
The protagonist, Shintaro Kikuchi, is born as the only child of a wealthy samurai family in rural Kyushu. The bankruptcy and death of Shintaro's father and loss of ancestral home forces the family into poverty. The novel follows Shintaro, as he struggles to get an education and to restore the family fortune.

== Translations ==
An English translation by Kenneth Strong was published in 1970 as part of the Japanese series in the UNESCO Collection of Representative Works. The translation received favorable reviews.
