= Yamakawa Futaba =

Japanese educator

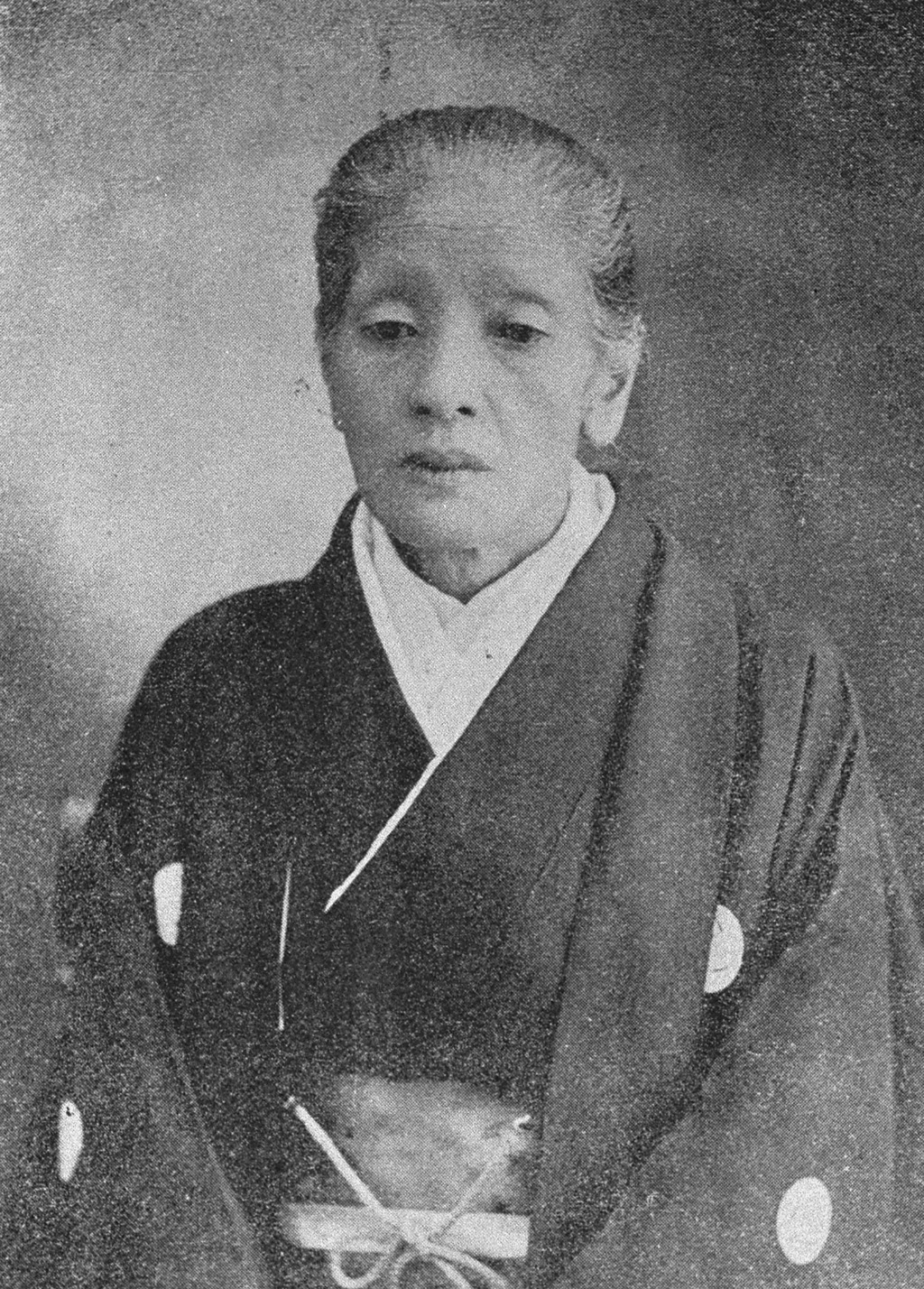
Yamakawa Futaba

Yamakawa Futaba (山川 二葉) (September 30, 1844 – November 14, 1909) was a Japanese educator of the early Meiji era.

== Life ==
=== Family ===
Born in Aizu, she was the sister of the karō, Yamakawa Hiroshi; her other siblings included physicist Yamakawa Kenjirō and Meiji-era social figure Ōyama Sutematsu.

=== Boshin war ===
Futaba took part in the defense of Tsuruga Castle in the Boshin War (1868-9). She was also briefly married to Kajiwara Heima, another Aizu karō.

=== As an educator ===
In the Meiji era, from 1875-1905, Futaba worked at the Tokyo Women's Normal School (東京女子高等師範学校, Tōkyō Joshi Kōtō Shihan Gakkō), the forerunner of Ochanomizu University, during the tenure of fellow Aizu native Takamine Hideo as principal. For her work in education, she was awarded with junior 5th court rank (従五位, ju go i).
