= Uryū Shigeko =

Japanese educator (1862–1928)

Baroness Uryū Shigeko
- 瓜生 繁子
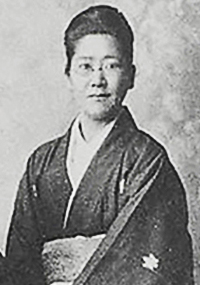
- Uryū Shigeko, in her later years

Personal details
- Born: Masuda Shige (益田 しげ); 18 April 1862 Edo, Japan
- Died: 3 November 1928 (aged 66) Tokyo, Japan
- Spouse: Uryū Sotokichi (m. 1882)
- Parent: Masuda Takayoshi (father)
- Relatives: Masuda Takashi (brother)
- Education: Certificate in Music
- Alma mater: Vassar College; Vassar School of Art
- Occupation: Educator, piano instructor
- Profession: Music
- Known for: one of the first women piano teachers in Japan
- Other names: Nagai Shige (永井 しげ); Shige Nagai; Nagai Shigeko (永井 繁子)

Baroness Uryū Shigeko (瓜生 繁子; 18 April 1862 – 3 November 1928) (née Masuda (益田) and formerly Nagai (永井)), was a Japanese educator, one of the first two Japanese women to attend a college, and one of the first piano teachers in Japan.

== Biography ==
Masuda Shige (益田 しげ) was born in Edo on 18 April 1862, one of the four daughters of Masuda Takayoshi, a Sado bugyō. She was the younger sister of Masuda Takashi. When she was six years old, she experienced the Battle of Ueno, part of the Boshin War in which her father and brother supported the losing side of the Tokugawa shogunate. To keep Shige safe from imperial backlash after the war, her brother Takashi asked his friend Nagai Gen'ei, a doctor who was relocating away from Tokyo with other exiled members of the shogun's retinue, to take Shige with him. She was adopted by Nagai Gen'ei or his son Kyūtarō and was known as Nagai Shige. She studied at the temple school in her new village for three years, learning to read and write Japanese.

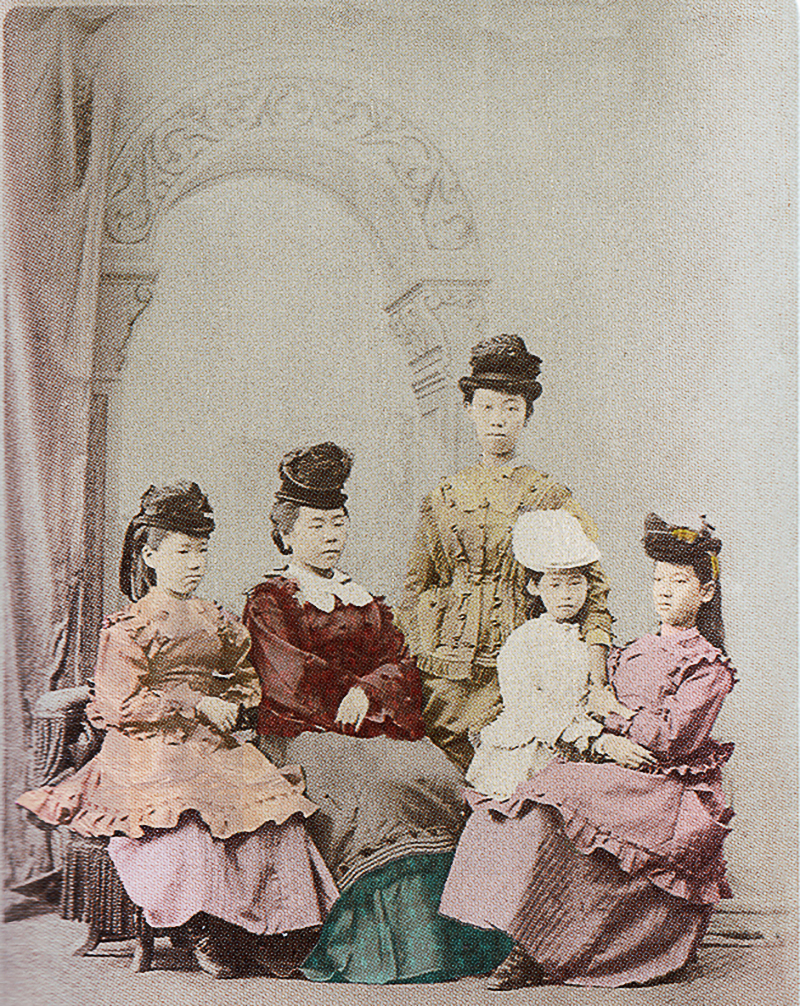
First female study-abroad students, from the left, Nagai Shigeko (10), Ueda Teiko (16), Yoshimasu Ryōko (16), Tsuda Ume (9) and Yamakawa Sutematsu (12)

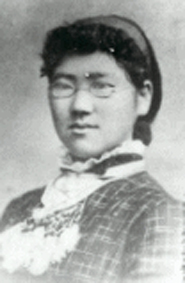
Nagai Shigeko, when attending Vassar College.

In November 1871 at the age of only 10 years old, Nagai Shige was among the five Japanese girls sent to the United States as part of the Iwakura Mission and was brought to the household of John Stevens Cabot Abbott. She graduated from New Haven High School. On September 19, 1878, she entered the School of Art at Vassar College under the name of Shige Nagai. She and Ōyama Sutematsu, who also enrolled at Vassar that year, were the first two Japanese women to enroll in a college. Shige studied music at Vassar for three years. She received a Certificate in Music from Vassar on June 22, 1881.

After returning to Japan in 1881, Nagai Shigeko married Uryū Sotokichi in a Christian ceremony on 1 December 1882.

Shigeko was one Japan's first piano teachers. She was one of the founding teachers, teaching Western music, at the Tokyo Music School when it opened in 1882. She also served as a teacher at the Tokyo Women's Normal School.

Her husband Uryū Sotokichi was made a Baron for his service in Japan's navy 1894-1895 and 1904–1905, and Shigeko became a Baroness. Baroness Uryū Shigeko made a visit to the United States in 1909, attending Vassar's commencement ceremony and speaking about the education of women in Japan.

She died on 3 November 1928.

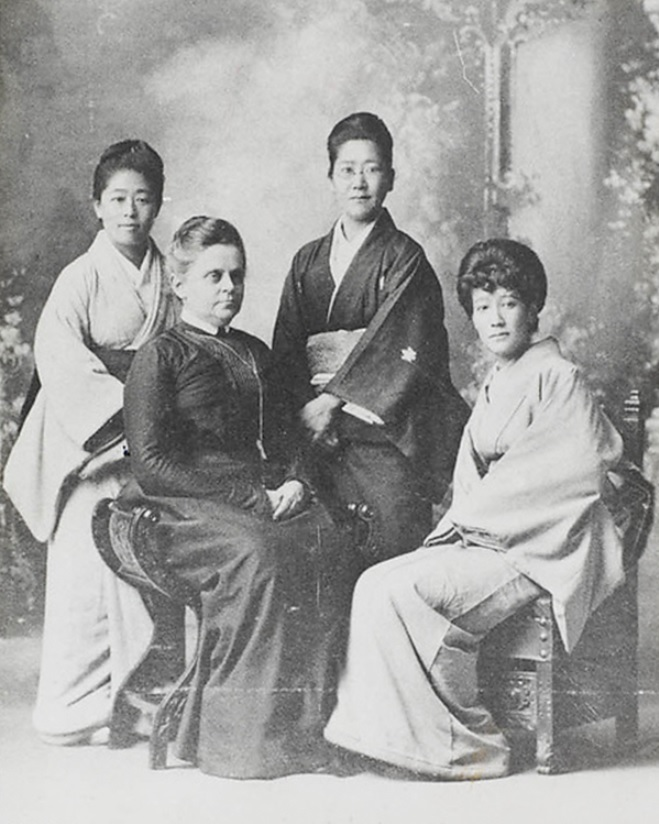
From left: Tsuda Umeko (1864–1929), Alice Bacon (1858–1918), Baroness Uryū Shigeko (1862–1928), Princess Ōyama Sutematsu (1860–1919)

== See also ==
- Ōyama Sutematsu
- Tsuda Umeko
- Daughters of the Samurai: A Journey from East to West and Back
