= Daughters of the Samurai =

2015 book by Janice P. Nimura

Daughters of the Samurai: A Journey from East to West and Back
- Author: Janice P. Nimura
- Language: English
- Subject: Sutematsu Yamakawa, Shige Nagai, Ume Tsuda
- Genre: Non-fiction; biography
- Publisher: W. W. Norton & Company
- Publication date: May 4, 2015
- Publication place: United States
- Media type: Print, digital
- Pages: 336 (hardcover)
- ISBN: 978-0-393-07799-5

Daughters of the Samurai: A Journey from East to West and Back is a 2015 non-fiction book by Janice P. Nimura, primarily about the lives of Sutematsu Yamakawa, Shige Nagai, and Ume Tsuda. These three Japanese girls were sent to America as part of the Iwakura Mission in 1871, at the ages of 11, 10, and 6 respectively, to receive ten years of American education before returning to Japan in 1882. Nimura explores the personalities and emotional experiences of these girls as they grow into young women and attempt to reconcile conflicting national identities. The title references Etsu Inagaki Sugimoto's autobiography, A Daughter of the Samurai. Unlike Etsu, who moved permanently to the United States in 1898, the earlier 'daughters of the samurai' in Nimura's book do not become Americans, but instead try to bring some part of America to Japan.

== Summary ==
Daughters of the Samurai begins with Sutematsu's traditional feudal childhood, disrupted by violent war, and then disrupted again by Japan's contact with America. Nimura describes the formulation of the Iwakura Mission, and the somewhat haphazard inclusion of five girls in the delegation. The two eldest girls, both aged 14, fell ill and returned to Japan within the first few months, but Sutematsu Yamakawa, Shige Nagai, and Ume Tsuda remained to spend ten years struggling to fulfill their ill-defined mission to acquire an American education for the benefit of Japan. The book follows each girl around the country through many changes in foster families and schools. Ume, the youngest, returned to Japan having completed high school, but no secondary education. Shige received a certificate from Vassar's School of Music. Sutematsu, the oldest, graduated from Vassar College, the first Japanese woman to receive an American college degree.

By 1882, all three had returned to Japan, and now faced the challenge of re-integrating their American educations within a home country they had not seen since they were children, and which was no longer as welcoming of modern American ideas. Sutematsu married a general in the Imperial Japanese Army, Ōyama Iwao, who eventually became Minister of War; she became a Countess and then a Princess. She advised the Empress on Western customs, and encouraged high-ranking Japanese women to support Japan's war efforts and volunteer as nurses. Shige married Baron Uryū Sotokichi and became a Baroness, while also teaching at the Tokyo Music School and Tokyo Women's Normal School. Ume, who never married, taught at the Peeresses' School and Tokyo Women's Normal School, returned to the United States to earn a degree from Bryn Mawr College, and eventually, with help from Sutematsu and Alice Bacon, founded the Joshi Eigaku Juku (Women's Institute for English Studies) in 1900.

== Composition and publication ==
Prior to beginning the book, Nimura lived for three years in Tokyo and in 2001 completed a masters degree in East Asian studies at Columbia University. She began the research which led her to this book when she came across the memoir of Alice Bacon, who plays a minor role in the resulting biography as an American friend of the girls who briefly lived with them in Japan. Of the origin of the book, she says:

I got lucky: I found a dusty memoir in the sub-basement of the New York Society Library on 79th Street. It was the work of Alice Mabel Bacon, a New Haven spinster who had traveled to Tokyo in 1888 to teach at a school for girls. This was unusual enough, but Alice wrote of living not among foreigners, but with “Japanese friends, known long and intimately in America.” Which didn’t make any sense at all. As far as I knew, there weren’t any Japanese women in New Haven at that time for her to have made friends with. Turns out that in 1872 her family had taken in an 11-year-old Japanese girl, who had grown up for a decade as Alice’s foster sister. Clearly, there was a larger story here, and I found it by following where Alice had led.

The book draws heavily on letters written by Sutematsu and Tsuda to their American friends and family, including from Sutematsu to Alice. In an interview with the Japan Times, Nimura described these letters as an unusually fertile resource for biography: "They all found incredible release in writing letters in English back to their friends in America... You get these letters that, for Victorian letters, are remarkably frank and have real voices in them.” However, Nimura's research on Shige was limited by the fact that the collection of her materials held by her family is not available to the public.

The book was published by Norton on June 1, 2015 as a hardcover, paperback, audio CD, and ebook. It has been translated into Japanese and Chinese. Nimura's research also located many historical photographs; those which were not included in the book are collected at her personal website.

== Reception ==
When the book was published, the New York Times Sunday Book Review praised the book for its ability to illuminate the different personalities of the three girls and to expand Americans' understanding of the Meiji era. The Los Angeles Review Of Books also praised Nimura's historical research. The Christian Science Monitor praised the story as inspirational, and the Washington Post praised its ability to make the girls' struggles feel relatable. The book received starred reviews in Kirkus, Publishers Weekly, Library Journal, and Booklist.

The book also received attention in some non-literary media outlets. Nimura was interviewed for the Japan Times, which drew particular attention to the way the book humanized Tsuda, a famous figure in Japan who is "revered almost as a patron saint" for having founded Tsuda University. The book was also reviewed in Vassar: The Alumnae/i Quarterly, highlighting Sutematsu's role in Vassar's history as "the first student of color known to have graduated from Vassar", and the magazine published an excerpt of the book's chapter on Sutematsu's time at the school.
