= Alice Mabel Bacon =

American writer, educator, and foreign advisor

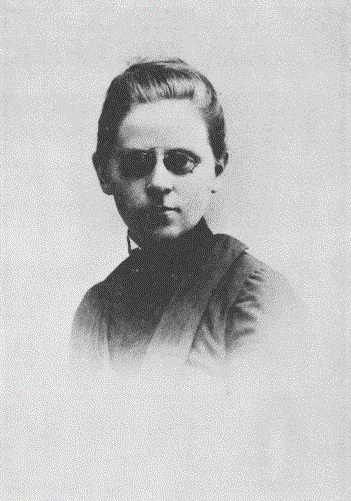
- Born: February 26, 1858; New Haven, Connecticut, United States
- Died: May 1, 1918 (aged 60); New Haven, Connecticut, United States
- Occupation: educator
- Children: two (adopted)
- Parent(s): Leonard Bacon (father); Catherine Elizabeth Terry (mother)

Academic background
- Education: Harvard University

Academic work
- Era: Meiji period
- Institutions: Hampton Institute; Gakushuin; Joshi Eigaku Juku; Miss Capen's School for Girls
- Notable works: The Work of the Tuskegee Normal School (1887); Japanese Girls and Women (1891); A Japanese Interior (1893); The Negro and the Atlantic exposition. (1896); In the Land of the Gods Some Stories of Japan (1905)

Alice Mabel Bacon (February 26, 1858 – May 1, 1918) was an American writer, women's educator and a foreign advisor to the Japanese government in Meiji period Japan.

== Early life ==
Alice Mabel Bacon was the youngest of the three daughters and two sons of Reverend Leonard Bacon, pastor of the Center Church in New Haven, Connecticut, professor at the Yale Divinity School, and his second wife, Catherine Elizabeth Terry. In 1872, when Alice was fourteen, Japanese envoy Mori Arinori selected her father's home as a residence for Japanese women being sent overseas for education by the Meiji government, as part of the Iwakura Mission. Alice received twelve-year-old Yamakawa Sutematsu as her house-guest. The two girls were of similar age, and soon formed a close bond. For ten years the two girls were like sisters and enhanced each other's interests in their different cultures.

== Education and career ==
Bacon graduated from high school but was forced to give up hopes of attending university due to economic circumstances. Nevertheless, she was able to pass examinations of philosophy and political economy for a Bachelor of Arts from Harvard University in 1881 and held a post as a teacher at the Hampton Institute in 1883.

In 1888, Bacon received an invitation to come to Japan from Yamakawa Sutematsu and Tsuda Ume to serve as a teacher of the English language at the Gakushuin Women's School (Peeresses' School) for Japanese girls from aristocratic families. She returned to Hampton Normal School after a year. Hearing that one of her students wanted to become a nurse but was refused entrance into training schools because of her race, Bacon sought to establish a hospital at the institute. With the help of General Samuel C. Armstrong, Hampton's principal, funds were raised to construct the Dixie Hospital. The hospital which opened in May 1891 provided nursing education and medical care for the surrounding community.

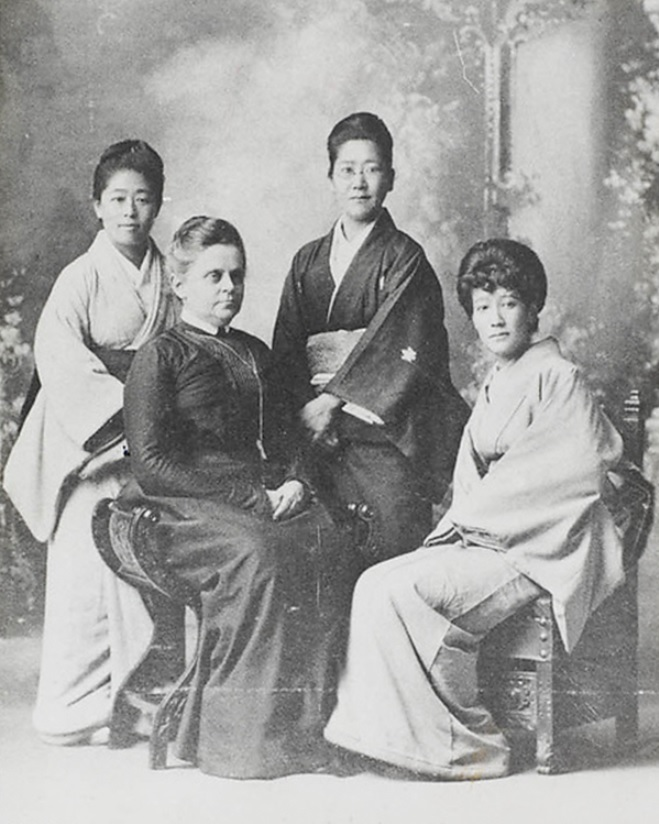
Tsuda Umeko, Alice Mabel Bacon, Uryū Shigeko, Ōyama Sutematsu (from left to right)

In April 1900, she was invited back to Japan to help establish the Joshi Eigaku Juku (Women's English Preparatory School), which was the forerunner of Tsuda College, staying until April 1902. During most of the period, she assisted Tsuda Umeko, refusing compensation except for her housing.

Bacon remained single all her life. She adopted two Japanese girls as her daughters, Umeko's niece Watanabe Mitsu, and Hitotsuyanagi Makiko. The latter married William Merrell Vories in 1919.

Based on her experiences in Japan, Bacon published three books and many essays, eventually becoming known as a specialist on Japanese culture and women. Her last teaching position was at Miss Capen's School for Girls at Northampton, Massachusetts from 1908 to 1910.

== Death ==
Alice died in her hometown of New Haven, Connecticut on 1 May 1918 at the age of 60. She was buried at the Grove Street Cemetery.

== Works ==
- The Work of the Tuskegee Normal School 1887
- Japanese Girls and Women (Boston: Houghton, Mifflin and Company, 1891) download on Project Gutenberg
- A Japanese Interior (Boston, Houghton, Mifflin and Company, 1893)
- The Negro and the Atlantic exposition. 1896
- In the Land of the Gods Some Stories of Japan. Boston: Houghton, Mifflin and Company. 1905.

== Footnote ==
1.Originally there were five girls sent but two became ill and returned to Japan the other three Yamakawa Sutematsu, Tsuda Ume, and Nagai Shigeko. Ms. Tsuda was placed with the Charles Lanman family and Ms. Nagai was placed in the John Stevens Cabot Abbott household. "Three Japanese Girls." The Heathen Woman's Friend. pp. 286-87.
