= Kenjirō Tokutomi =

Japanese writer and philosopher

- 徳富 健次郎
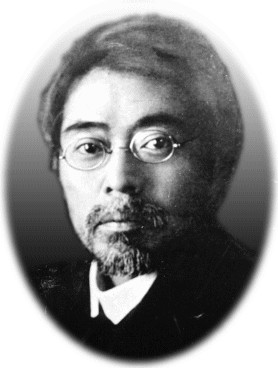
- Born: December 8, 1868; Minamata, Kumamoto, Japan
- Died: September 18, 1927 (aged 58); Ikaho, Gunma, Japan
- Occupation: Writer
- Writing career
- Language: Japanese
- Genre: Novels
- Notable work: The Cuckoo

Kenjirō Tokutomi (徳富 健次郎, Tokutomi Kenjirō) (December 8, 1868 – September 18, 1927) was a Japanese writer and philosopher. He wrote novels under the pseudonym of Roka Tokutomi (徳冨 蘆花, Tokutomi Roka; Japanese pronunciation: [to.kɯ̥.toꜜ.mʲi | ɾoꜜ.ka, to.kɯ̥.to.mʲi ɾoꜜ.ka]), and his best-known work was his 1899 novel The Cuckoo.

== Biography ==
Tokutomi was born on December 8, 1868, in Minamata, Japan, to a samurai family. He was the younger brother of journalist and historian Tokutomi Sohō. He converted to Christianity in 1885, and moved to Imabari, Ehime, where he lived with Shiro Sokabe and was a student of Tokio Yokoi. This is also where he received the nickname "Roka". He later attended Doshisha University.

He wrote for newspapers owned by his brother, Sohō, until his novel The Cuckoo, was published and became successful enough that Tokutomi could make a living as a writer on his own. It was translated 15 times between 1904 and 1918, and is one of the first Japanese works to be widely translated and distributed internationally.

After meeting Leo Tolstoy, Tokutomi became inspired to move to the countryside. Their correspondence is on display in the small museum located in the Roka Kōshun-en Park, along with belongings.

From February 27, 1907, until his death, he lived in a house in Musashino (Setagaya, Tokyo, Japan). After his wife's death, the property was donated to the city of Tokyo to be used as a park. It was named Roka Kōshun-en in his honor.

Tokutomi died on September 18, 1927, in Ikaho, Gunma, one day after reconciling with Sohō.

== Selected bibliography ==
- Tokutomi, Kenjiro (1899). Hototogisu 不如帰 [The Cuckoo or Namiko].
- Tokutomi, Kenjiro (1901). Omoide no Ki 思出の記 [Footprints in the Snow]. Translated by Strong, Kenneth.
- Tokutomi, Roka (1913). Mimizu no tawagoto みみずのたはこと [Ramblings of an earthworm].
- Tokutomi, Kenjiro (1920). Shizen to Jinsei 自然と人生 [Nature and man]. Tokyo: Kogakukan.
