= Onna Daigaku =

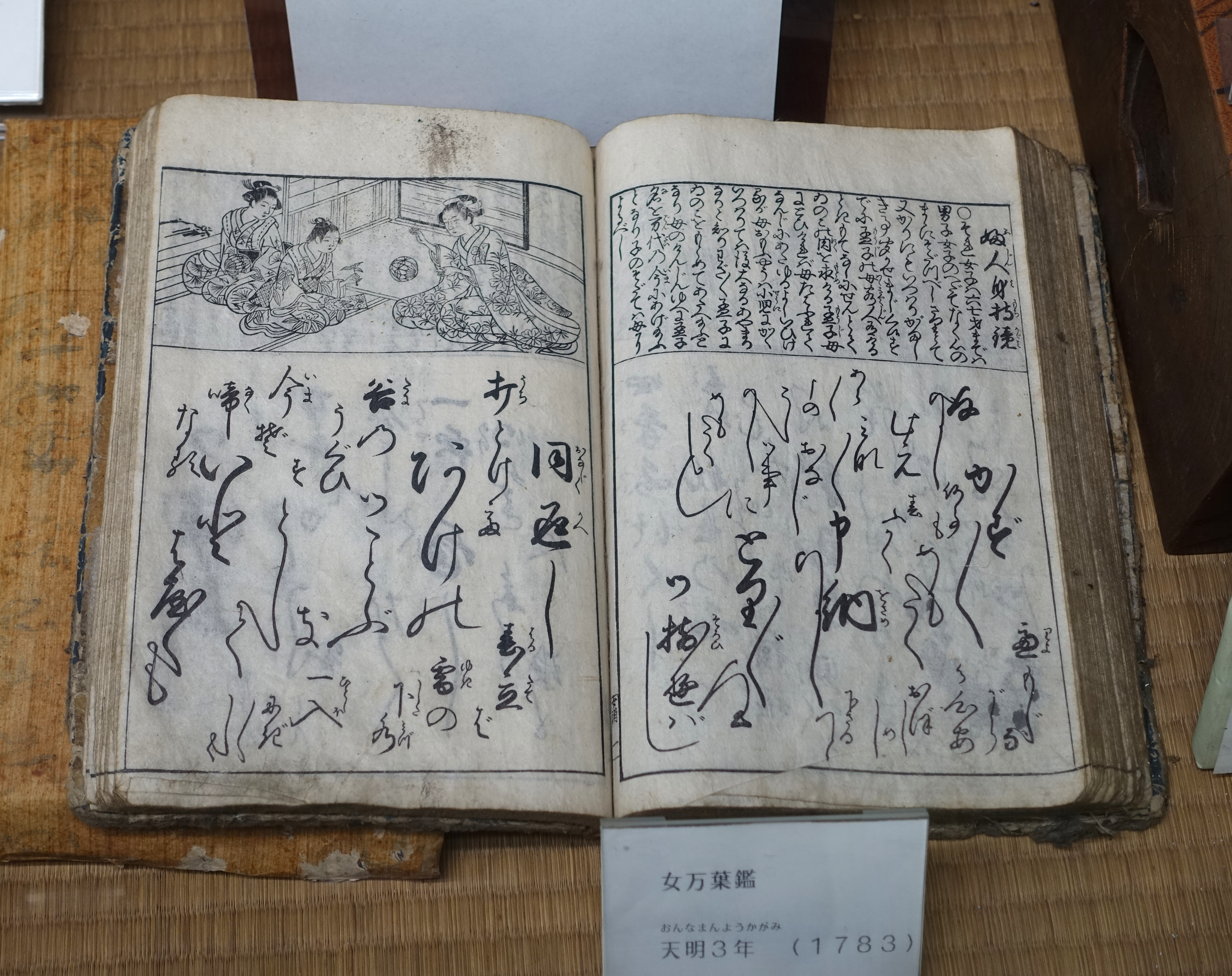
Onna daigaku, this edition 1783 AD

The Onna Daigaku (女大学 or "The Great Learning for Women") is an 18th-century Japanese educational text advocating for neo-Confucian values in education, with the oldest existing version dating to 1729. It is frequently attributed to Japanese botanist and educator Kaibara Ekken.

== Education of women ==
The Onna Daigaku is cited as Ekken's most popular book, which was often gifted to new brides due to its accessible tone and a lack of general instructional materials for new families.

It teaches the moral need for total subordination of women to the needs to the husband and family. The book suggests that women are too stupid to trust themselves and must "distrust herself and obey her husband". Scholars point to the wide circulation of the text as reflective of Edo-period misogyny. It was roundly criticized by advocates of women's education during the Meiji era.

=== Seven grounds for divorce ===
The book encourages several grounds for a husband to divorce his wife, including disobedience to her in-laws, infertility (unless a barren woman allows for adoption of a concubine's child), lewdness, jealousy, leprosy, talking too much, or compulsive thievery.
