= Yamakawa Kenjirō =

Japanese politician and academic

Senior Second Rank Baron Yamakawa Kenjirō
- 山川 健次郎
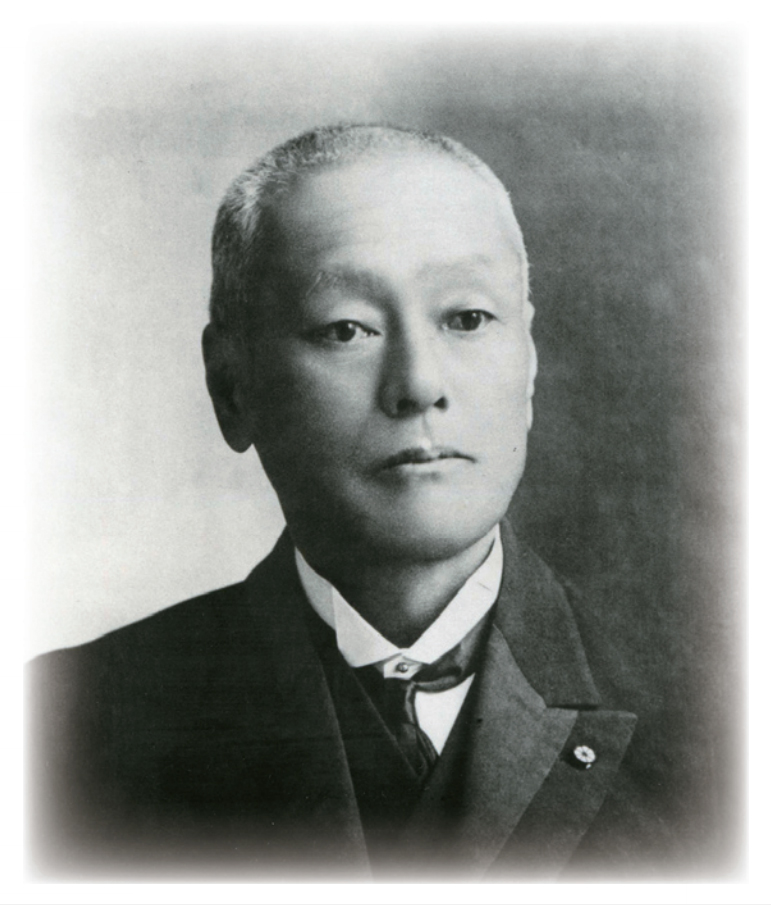
- Baron Yamakawa Kenjirō

Member of the Privy Council
- In office 26 February 1923 – 26 June 1931
- Monarchs: Taishō; Hirohito

Member of the House of Peers
- In office 22 August 1904 – 1 March 1923 Nominated by the Emperor

Personal details
- Born: 9 September 1854 Aizu-Wakamatsu, Mutsu, Japan
- Died: 26 June 1931 (aged 76) Ikebukuro, Tokyo, Japan
- Relatives: Yamakawa Hiroshi (brother); Yamakawa Futaba (sister); Ōyama Sutematsu (sister); Ōyama Iwao (brother-in-law)
- Education: Yale University
- Scientific career
- Fields: Physics
- Workplaces: Tokyo Imperial University; Kyushu Imperial University; Kyoto Imperial University

Baron Yamakawa Kenjirō (山川 健次郎; 9 September 1854 – 26 June 1931) was a Japanese samurai, politician, physicist, academic administrator, and author of several histories of the Boshin War. He served as president of Tokyo Imperial University, Kyushu Imperial University, and Kyoto Imperial University. He also served as a Privy Councilor and a member of the House of Peers. Though his name is commonly written "Yamakawa," he himself wrote it as "Yamagawa" in English.

== Biography ==
Yamakawa was born as the third son to Yamakawa Naoe, a senior samurai of the Aizu Domain (present day Fukushima Prefecture). He became a member of the Byakkotai, a unit of the newly reorganized Aizu domain army composed mostly of boys aged 15 to 17 years, who fought in defense of Aizu during the Boshin War.

After the Meiji Restoration, through the mediation of the Zen monk Kawai Zenjun, Yamakawa was placed in the care of Chōshū retainer Okudaira Kensuke. Yamakawa was sent by the new Meiji government to study physics at Sheffield Scientific School, Yale University, where he was the first student from Japan to graduate. On his return to Japan, he was posted to Tokyo Imperial University working as an assistant and interpreter, and became Japan’s first Japanese professor of physics in 1879. (There had already been several foreign professors, such as Thomas Corwin Mendenhall and William Edward Ayrton.)

During the Meiji and Taishō periods he helped found the Kyushu Institute of Technology in 1907 and served as president of Tokyo Imperial University (1901–1905 and 1913–1920), Kyushu Imperial University (1911–1913), and Kyoto Imperial University (1914-1915). He was later ennobled with the title of danshaku (baron) under the kazoku peerage system. Later in his life he was also a Privy Councilor (appointed in February 1923) and a member of the House of Peers.

He and his brother Yamakawa Hiroshi are known amongst historians of the late Edo period as authors of two monumental texts—Kenjirō's being "Aizu Boshin Senshi," which catalogues the actions of his home domain during the war. He also authored several other history texts, including "Hoshū Aizu Byakkotai Jūkyūshi-den," which he wrote with fellow Aizu native Munekawa Toraji.

Yamakawa's sisters, Yamakawa Futaba (1844–1909) and Yamakawa Sutematsu (1860–1919), later Princess Ōyama Sutematsu (大山 捨松), are also well-known. Futaba, who fought in the Battle of Aizu during the Boshin War, later worked at the Tokyo Women's Normal School (東京女子高等師範学校, Tōkyō Joshi Kōtō Shihan Gakkō), the forerunner of Ochanomizu University. Sutematsu was one of five Japanese girls sent to the United States as part of the Iwakura Mission; she was the first Japanese graduate of Vassar University, and later became the wife of Imperial Japanese Army general Ōyama Iwao.

== Honours ==
From the Japanese Wikipedia article

=== Titles ===
- Baron (1 December 1915)

=== Decorations ===
- Grand Cordon of the Order of the Sacred Treasure (25 June 1920; Second Class: 27 June 1912; Third Class: 27 December 1899; Fourth Class: 25 December 1896; Fifth Class: 21 June 1895; Sixth Class: 27 June 1891)
- Grand Cordon of the Order of the Rising Sun (21 April 1928; Second Class: 1 April 1916; Third Class: 1 April 1906)
- Grand Cordon of the Order of the Paulownia Flowers (26 June 1931, posthumous)

== References and further reading ==
- Hoshi Ryōichi (2003). Yamakawa Kenjiro Den. Heibonsha. ISBN 4-582-83181-8.
- Marshall, Byron K. The Tradition of Conflict in the Governance of Japan's Imperial Universities. History of Education Quarterly, Vol. 17, No. 4 (Winter, 1977), pp. 385–406
- Yamakawa Kenjiro (1931). Aizu Boshin Senshi. Tokyo: Tokyo Daigaku Shuppankai.
