= Frances Little =

American writer (1863–1941)

- Born: Fannie Caldwell; November 22, 1863; Shelbyville, Kentucky, U.S.
- Died: January 6, 1941 (aged 77); Louisville, Kentucky, U.S.
- Resting place: Cave Hill Cemetery; Louisville, Kentucky, U.S.
- Occupation: Writer

Frances Little (November 22, 1863 – January 6, 1941) was the pseudonym of American author Fannie Caldwell. Her first and most successful book, The Lady of the Decoration, was based on her experiences in Hiroshima, Japan, from 1902 to 1907.

== Life ==
Fannie Caldwell was born in Shelbyville, Kentucky to Judge James Lafayette and Mary Lettia (Middleton) Caldwell on November 22, 1863. Fannie received an education from Science Hill Academy. Fannie and her husband, businessman James D. Macaulay, lived on South Fourth Street in Louisville, Kentucky. Before becoming a writer she was a kindergarten teacher in Louisville from 1899 to 1902, but after her divorce she traveled abroad and became the "supervisor of normal classes, kindergartens, at Hiroshima, Japan, from 1902 to 1907."

During her time in Japan, Caldwell wrote letters to her niece, Alice Hegan Rice. Rice decided to turn the letters into a book, after removing any personal details. The resulting book The Lady of the Decoration was published in New York City in 1906 and would be Caldwell's most successful work. Rice created the pseudonymous name of Frances Little by reversing Caldwell's nickname "Little Fan." The title was inspired by Caldwell's students, who called her their "Lady of the Decoration" every time that she "pinned on her little enameled watch." The book is set between 1901 and 1905, and is written in the form of letters home to a female friend or sister; it's not made clear. The main character is a young missionary kindergarten teacher in Hiroshima, Japan before and during the Russo-Japanese War. She travels to Vladivostok, Russia just before the outbreak of the Russo-Japanese War and makes a number of critical observations. At the beginning of the 20th century, most Americans knew very little of Japan, and Caldwell's novel presented a view of Japanese life that captured the imagination of the reading public, who made it the number 1 bestselling novel in the United States for 1907. Caldwell rode the wave of American interest and support for Japan in the Russo-Japanese War, and supported the Japanese cause throughout.

Caldwell eventually returned to Kentucky, where she lectured on Japan and continued to write books after the success of The Lady of the Decoration.

On January 6, 1941, Fannie died due to influenza at the Jewish Hospital in Louisville, Kentucky. She was buried in Cave Hill Cemetery in Louisville.

In December 2005, Project Gutenberg published the short story "Mr. Bamboo and the Honorable Little God, A Christmas Story" under Caldwell's married name of Fannie C. Macaulay.

== Bibliography ==
- The Lady of the Decoration (1906)
- Little Sister Snow (1909)
- The Lady and Sada San (1912)
- Camp Jolly (1917)
- House of the Misty Star (1915)
- Jack and I in Lotus Land (1922)
- Early American textiles (1931)
