= Janice P. Nimura =

American biographer

Janice P. Nimura is an American author.

Her book The Doctors Blackwell was a 2022 Pulitzer Prize biography finalist.

== Books ==
- Daughters of the Samurai: A Journey from East to West and Back (W. W. Norton & Company, 2015)
- The Doctors Blackwell: How Two Pioneering Sisters Brought Medicine to Women and Women to Medicine (W. W. Norton & Company, 2021)
