= The Cuckoo (novel) =

Novel by Kenjirō Tokutomi

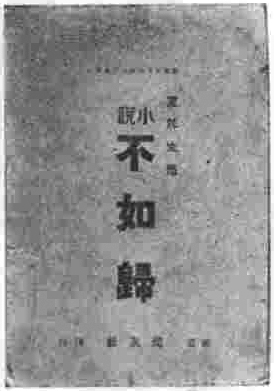
- Cover of the first edition (1900)
- Author: Kenjirō Tokutomi
- Original title: 不如帰 (Hototogisu)
- Set in: Tokyo, 1893–1895
- Publication date: 1898–1899
- Publication place: Japan
- English publication date: 1904

The Cuckoo (不如帰, Hototogisu), also called Nami-ko in English, is a Japanese novel first published by Kenjirō Tokutomi (under the pen name Rōka Tokutomi) in serialized form between 1898 and 1899. It was republished as a book in 1900 and became a bestseller. Beginning in 1904, it was also widely translated and read in the United States and Europe. The story is a tragic melodrama about the family conflict that ensues when Namiko, a young wife, contracts tuberculosis. Her husband initially resists his mother's pressure to end the marriage, but when he is drafted into the First Sino-Japanese War, his mother dissolves their marriage and Namiko dies. The novel critiques Japanese feudal values, especially the vulnerable social position of women.

== Synopsis ==
The novel is an example of the Meiji period genre of katei shōsetsu, or "domestic fiction". Namiko, the daughter of a general, and Takeo, a naval officer and son of a deceased baron, begin the story happily married. Their happiness is undermined by cruelty from Taneo, who is Takeo's cousin and a rejected suitor of Namiko's, and from Takeo's mother, who is a demanding mother-in-law to Namiko. Then, Namiko contracts tuberculosis. Takeo's mother urges him to divorce Namiko, as her illness prevents her from having children. Takeo is torn between duty to his family line and individual moral authenticity. Even though it means the end of his lineage, he refuses to divorce Namiko, which he considers to be inhumane and unethical. At the outbreak of the First Sino-Japanese War, Takeo is called up for active duty, leaving Namiko unprotected. His mother, encouraged by the vengeful Taneo, sends Namiko back to her family, effectively dissolving her son's marriage. Takeo attempts to die in battle, but is only wounded. Namiko considers throwing herself into the sea, but is stopped by an old woman who brings her a copy of the Christian Bible, which they discuss. She dies of her illness, and the novel ends with her father and her former husband meeting and mourning at her grave.

== Publication and reception ==
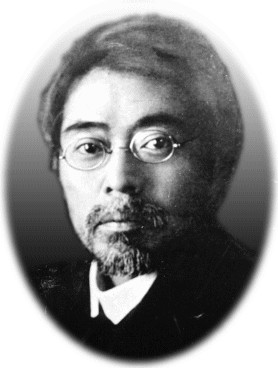
Kenjiro Tokutomi

Tokutomi was a staff journalist for his brother's publishing company, Min'yusha, when he began writing the novel, and was not yet a particularly successful or well-known writer. The story was serialized from November 1898 to May 1899 in the newspaper Kokumin shinbun and drew some favorable attention at that time. Tokutomi revised the story, and published it as a standalone book in 1900, which is when it became a major success. It went through a hundred printings by 1909, and a hundred and ninety-two printings, for a total of 500,000 copies, by the time of Tokutomi's death in 1927. This made it "one of the most phenomenal commercial successes Japan had ever known" for a book at the time.

At the time of its first publication, the novel was appreciated for its flowery language and emotional scenes, with many readers describing crying while reading. Unusually, it was popular with people of varied backgrounds, not just the literary elite. The poet Takahama Kyoshi wrote a haiku describing his enjoyment of the novel: "At my hibachi, tears fall on the novel." The novel was also read by female factory workers, which Takateru Teru observed set it apart from the other major hit at the time, Ozaki Kōyō's Konjiki yasha (The Usurer, also known as The Golden Demon).

The novel continued to be well-known and influential in later generations. Namiko's dying words have been described as "without a doubt among the most famous lines of Meiji popular fiction" and "penetrated into the Japanese collective memory." William Johnston, however, has recently suggested that there was a sharp decline in the novel's cultural prevalence after the 1950s, as tuberculosis disappeared from Japan. Now, he says, "[f]ew have heard of Hototogisu. And having grown up in the healthiest period in their nation's history, they find it hard to believe that their parents lived through Japan's worst epidemic ever of an infectious disease."

== Inspiration ==
The novel is based on the story of Ōyama Nobuko (daughter of Ōyama Iwao) and Mishima Yatarō. Many of its Japanese readers would have been familiar with the real-life events it depicted. Nobuko and Yatarō married in 1893, a love match which also united two powerful families. Nobuko was seventeen at the time, and Yatarō twenty-six, recently returned from study abroad in America. The winter after their marriage, Nobuko became ill with tuberculosis, and was sent back to her parents to convalesce. Yatarō's mother insisted that he divorce her, although he felt it was wrong. While Nobuko was being nursed at a relative's house in the countryside, her parents agreed to a divorce. The Ōyamas' servants attempted to intercept Yatarō's letters to Nobuko, but one reached her which revealed the truth. Their marriage was dissolved in the fall of 1895. Nobuko was moved back to her parents' house in Onden, Tokyo (now Harajuku), where they built a new wing of their house for her to prevent transmission of the illness. Nobuko's stepmother, Ōyama Sutematsu, was the subject of unsympathetic gossip for isolating her stepdaughter, which was seen as a punishing exile. In the novel, she is presented as corrupted by an education in England and jealous of her stepdaughter. Nobuko died in May 1896, age twenty. Yatarō remarried, to Shijō Kaneko, and their son Mishima Michiharu was born in January 1897.

== Major themes ==
The novel's romantic tragedy captured important cultural changes in the Meiji period regarding marriage and family, gender roles, and modern wars and diseases.

According to Ken K. Ito, the novel is "most often remembered as a novel that protests the victimization of women, particularly the victimization of young brides". During the time period that the novel was written, Japan was undergoing a cultural shift away from the more feudal and hierarchical idea of ie. Instead, Western ideas of home and marital love, called katei or hōmu, were gaining traction. Min'yusha, the publishing company for which Tokutomi first wrote the story, often published explicitly didactic literature in favor of these new ideas of home life. The novel presents Takeo's mother as the representative of the old ie system. She destroys Takeo and Namiko's marriage out of her sense of duty, which the novel presents as deeply misguided.

Namiko's tragic suffering from tuberculosis makes her an example of the late nineteenth romantic stereotype of "the languid and sickly but passionate and loving beauty". Non-Japanese audiences often compared her to the character in Pierre Loti's novel Madame Chrysanthème, which formed the basis for the opera Madama Butterfly. These comparisons found Namiko even more tragic and admirable than Madame Chrysanthème because Namiko's suffering was caused by Japan's feudal society rather than by a Western outsider, and because Namiko's personality was seen as more complex and realistic.

Takeo's mother reflects established and conservative views of tuberculosis as hereditary, infectious, and inevitably fatal. Once Namiko becomes ill, she sees her as a force of destruction which could end the whole family. She also sees illness itself as a moral failing. Takeo presents a more modern view by seeing its transmission as not clearly hereditary or infectious, and by suggesting that proper treatment could eventually restore Namiko's health. As such, the novel sought to promote more tolerance and acceptance for people with tuberculosis, although it may have had the opposite effect in practice. Among the factory workers who learned the story through a popular song, for example, those who became more aware of tuberculosis through The Cuckoo also became more likely to shun those who were ill.

== Translations and adaptations ==
Within Japan, the novel inspired a volume of poetry, Katei shinshi: Hototogisu no uta (Tokyodo, 1905) by Mizoguchi Hakuyō, which was also successful, with twenty-nine printings in its first two years. It also inspired a popular song. The story was adapted into many stage and film versions for decades after the novel's release. The first stage adaptation was in 1901, adapted by Namiki Heisui, and performed at the Osaka Asahiza in February 1901 and the Hongōza in Tokyo in May 1903. There were also stage performances at the Tōkyōza (adapted by Takeshiba Shinkichi) in September 1904, and at the Hongōza again (adapted by Yanagawa Shun'yō) in April 1908. In film, more than fifteen different movies based on the novel were made between 1909 and 1932.

Outside of Japan, the novel was translated into fifteen languages for sales overseas between 1904 and 1908. Andō Yoshirō claims that these translations make The Cuckoo "The First Japanese Novel Presented to the West." Isabelle Lavelle attributes the novel's overseas popularity at this time to an increased Western interest in Japanese life and culture due to the Russo-Japanese War (1904-1905), especially since the Christian morality of the novel could appeal to Western tastes. The novel's first translation was into English in 1904, as Nami-Ko: A Realistic Novel. This translation was a collaboration between a Japanese teacher of English, Shioya Sakae, and the native English speaker E. F. Edgett. The second translation, into French as Plutôt la Mort ("Rather Death"), (Note: The translator of the French edition falsely claimed that the characters of the original Japanese title, Hototogisu, in addition to representing a cuckoo's cry, could be translated as "Rather Death!") was based on the original Japanese, and attributed to Olivier Le Paladin. Other translations, into German, Spanish, Portuguese, Italian, Swedish, and Finnish, may have been based on the 1904 English version. The early English and French translations took slightly different approaches to the text, with the French text generally providing more detailed footnotes and trying to capture expressive details of the characters' speech. In 1918, a newer English translation by Isaac Goldberg was published, titled The Heart of Nami-San: A Story of War, Intrigue and Love, which was dedicated to the feminist Alice Stone Blackwell. These translations have not been republished, however, since the 1920s.

In the original Japanese, the story is divided into three books, each with many short, unnamed chapters. Translations into other languages combined these chapters together and assigned titles to them.

In 2005, the novel was adapted into a two-volume digital josei manga drawn by Mako Takami, which was itself translated into English.

=== Translating Namiko's final words ===
Namiko's last words before her death are "aa tsurai! tsurai! mō— mō onna nanzo ni— umare wa shimasen yo. —aaa!" ("ああつらい！ つらい！ もう――もう婦人なんぞに――生まれはしませんよ。――あああ！"). Contemporary scholars translated these lines as "Oh my heart! Such a torture! Never – never again will I be born as a woman! Aah!" or as "It's more than I can bear. It's more than I can bear. I'll never, never, never be born a woman again." In the twentieth-century French and English translations, Namiko's dying words are not translated faithfully, perhaps because the translators assumed their readers would not understand the reference to reincarnation. The 1904 English translation translate Namiko's words only as "Oh, my heart! Such a torture!"; the 1918 English translation gives "Oh! My heart! My heart!"; and the French translation gives "Ah, mon pauvre cœur!.... Quelle torture! quelle torture! Mieux eût valu n’être pas née!... Je souffre!" ("Ah, my poor heart! What a torture! It would have been better not to be born! How I suffer!") All of these translations leave out Namiko's plea not to be reborn as a woman, which was considered a strong condemnation of the position of women in Japanese society.
