= John Stevens Cabot Abbott =

American historian (1805–1877)

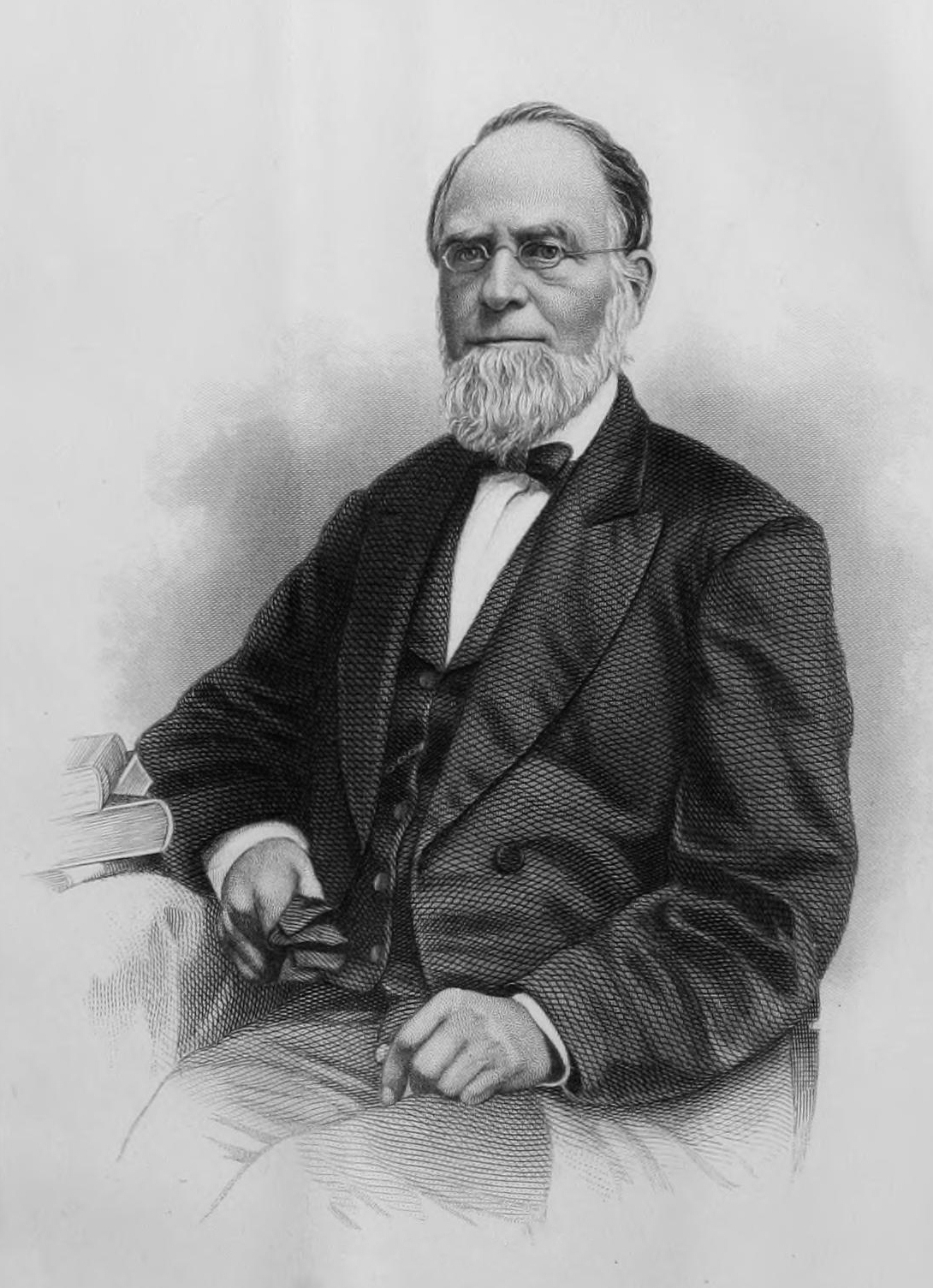
- Born: September 19, 1805; Brunswick, Maine, U.S.
- Died: June 17, 1877 (aged 71); Fair Haven, Connecticut, U.S.
- Education: Bowdoin College; Andover Theological Seminary
- Occupations: Author; historian; pastor
- Works related to John Stevens Cabot Abbott at Wikisource

John Stevens Cabot Abbott (September 19, 1805 – June 17, 1877) was an American historian, pastor, and pedagogical writer born in Brunswick, Maine to Jacob and Betsey Abbott.

== Early life ==
He was a brother of Jacob Abbott, and was associated with him in the management of Abbott's Institute in New York City, and in the preparation of his series of brief historical biographies. Abbott graduated at Bowdoin College in 1825, prepared for the ministry at Andover Theological Seminary, and between 1830 and 1844, when he retired from the ministry in the Congregational Church, preached successively at Worcester, Roxbury, and Nantucket, all in Massachusetts.

== Literary career ==
Owing to the success of his work, The Mother at Home, he devoted himself from 1844 onwards, to literature. He was a voluminous writer of books on Christian ethics, and of popular histories, which were credited with cultivating a popular interest in history. He is best known as the author of the widely popular History of Napoleon Bonaparte (1855), in which the various elements and episodes in Napoleon's career are described. Abbott takes a very favourable view towards his subject throughout. Also among his principal works are: History of the Civil War in America (1863–1866), History of Napoleon III Emperor of the French (1868), and The History of Frederick II, Called Frederick the Great (New York, 1871). He also did a foreword to a book called Life of Boone by W.M. Bogart, about Daniel Boone in 1876.

His biography in The Biographical Dictionary of America (1906) states that Abbot's mind was extremely clear and active, and he could leave the subject in hand for something entirely different, and then resume his former work without the slightest inconvenience, also he had a singularly even temperament; by his personal goodness, as well as by his books, he had a great influence on the world, he continued active in work nearly to the time of his death, to which he looked forward with joy rather than resignation. The Encyclopædia Britannica (11th edition) stated "He was a voluminous writer of books on Christian ethics, and of histories, which now seem unscholarly and untrustworthy, but were valuable in their time in cultivating a popular interest in history"; and that in general, except that he did not write juvenile fiction, his work in subject and style closely resembles that of his brother, Jacob Abbott.

== Marriage and children ==
On August 17, 1830, he married Jane Williams Bourne, daughter of Abner Bourne and Abagail Williams. Together they raised eight children:

1. John Brown Abbott (November 29, 1832 – May 24, 1842)
2. Jane Maria Abbott (born November 25, 1833)
3. Waldo Abbott (September 8, 1836 – July 7, 1864)
4. Harriet Vaughan Abbott (born February 18, 1838)
5. Ellen Williams Abbott(born January 11, 1840)
6. Laura Sallucia Abbott (born October 30, 1843)
7. Elizabeth Ballister Abbott (March 15, 1847 – February 23, 1864)
8. Emma Susan Abbott (born July 12, 1849)

As a part of the 1872 Iwakura Mission Abbott was given guardianship of Shige Nagai, a Japanese girl sent to the United States to be educated. She became one of the first piano teachers in Japan, and one of the first two Japanese women to attend a college.

Abbott died at Fair Haven, Connecticut on 17 June 1877. In 1910, a series of twenty short biographies of historical characters by J. S. C. and Jacob Abbott, was published. His brother, Gorham Dummer Abbott, was a pioneer in women's education in the United States, as well as an author. Abbott's grandson, Willis Abbott, was a journalist and author and an editor of The Christian Science Monitor.

== Selected bibliography ==
=== Inspirational/religious ===
- The Mother At Home (c. 1830)
- The Path of Peace (1836)
- The Child At Home (1834)
- The School-Boy (1839)
- The History of Christianity: consisting of the life and teachings of Jesus of Nazareth, the adventures of Paul and the apostles and the most interesting events in the progress of Christianity from the earliest period to the present time (1872)

=== Historical ===
- The History of the Civil War in America, (two volumes)
- The History of Napoleon Bonaparte (1855) (two volumes)
- Napoleon At St. Helena (1855)
- Kings And Queens (1855)
- Confidential Correspondence Of The Emperor Napoleon (1856)
- The French Revolution of 1789 [1859]
- The Empire Of Russia: Its Rise And Present Power
- Austria: Its Rise And Present Power
- History of the Habsburg Empire
- Italy
- The History of Napoleon III, Emperor of the French (1868)
- The Romance Of Spanish History (1869)
- Prussia and the Franco-Prussian War (1871)
- The History Of Frederick II, Called Frederick The Great (1871)
- The History of The State of Ohio (1875)
- Lives Of The Presidents Of The United States (1876)

=== Biographies ===
Published after 1850 in the series Illustrated History, with other titles by his brother Jacob Abbott. Later reissued in the Famous Characters of History series, and in the 1904 series Makers of History

- Cortez
- Henry IV
- Louis XIV
- King Philip (Metacomet), war chief of the Wampanoag people
- Madame Roland
- Marie Antoinette: Makers of History (1901)
- Joseph Bonaparte, elder brother of Napoleon Bonaparte
- Josephine, wife of Napoleon Bonaparte
- Hortense, daughter of Josephine
- Louis Philippe, the last king to rule France, although Emperor Napoleon III would serve as its last monarch.

The American Pioneers And Patriots set

- Daniel Boone
- Miles Standish
- De Soto
- Peter Stuyvesant
- Kit Carson
- David Crockett
- Captain Kidd
- John Paul Jones
- La Salle
- Christopher Columbus
- George Washington
- Benjamin Franklin

=== Juvenile ===
- The Child At Home (1834)
- The School Boy (1839)
- The School Girl (1840)
- A Visit To The Mountains (1844)
