= Yamakawa Hiroshi =

Baron Yamakawa Hiroshi
- 山川 浩
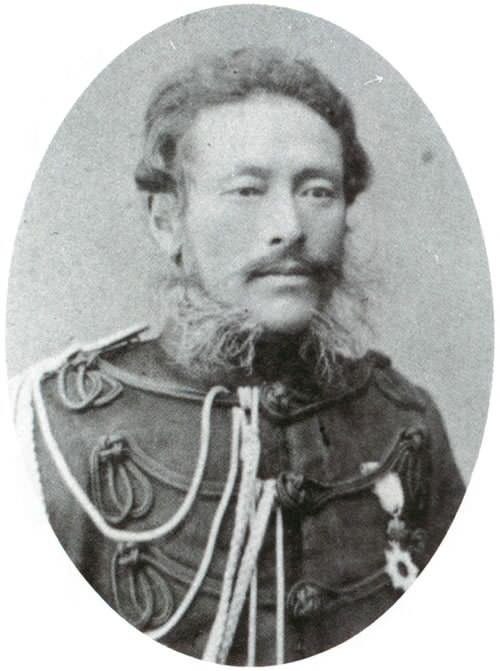
- Born: December 4, 1845; Aizuwakamatsu, Aizu Domain, Japan
- Died: March 6, 1898 (aged 52); Tokyo, Japan
- Spouse: Yamakawa Tose
- Military career
- Allegiance: Empire of Japan
- Branch: Imperial Japanese Army
- Rank: Major General
- Conflicts: Boshin War; Battle of Toba–Fushimi; Battle of Bonari Pass; Battle of Aizu; Saga Rebellion; Satsuma Rebellion
- Awards: Order of the Rising Sun

Baron Yamakawa Hiroshi (山川 浩, Hiroshi Yamakawa; 4 December 1845 – 6 March 1898) was a Japanese general, samurai, politician and educator. Originally a samurai from Aizu Domain during Bakumatsu, he became a general in the early Meiji era Imperial Japanese Army. He was also one of the first persons, together with his brother Kenjirō, to write a history of the Aizu War from the Aizu perspective. His brother-in-law was general Oyama Iwao, who married his sister Sutematsu.

== Biography ==
=== Early life ===
Yamakawa Hiroshi, or, as he was first known, Yōshichirō (与七郎), was born in Aizu-Wakamatsu (present day Fukushima Prefecture), in 1845. His father, Yamakawa Shigekata (山川重固), was a karō (senior retainer) of the Aizu clan with revenues of 1000 koku, and his mother, Tōi (唐衣), was the daughter of another karō family, the Saigō. His siblings included Yamakawa Kenjirō (健次郎; 1854–1931) and Ōyama Sutematsu (大山 捨松; 1860–1919). When Yōshichirō was 15, his father died and he succeeded to the family headship.

In 1862, Yōshichirō, now known as Shigeyoshi (重栄) or more commonly, Ōkura (大蔵), accompanied Aizu daimyō Matsudaira Katamori to Kyōto when the latter was appointed to the post of Kyoto Shugoshoku. During this turbulent version, Yamakawa served as an Aizu samurai through the heat of the conflicts of 1863-65. In 1866 Yamakawa was allowed to accompany the Shogunate's Foreign Affairs Magistrate Koide Hidezane to Imperial Russia, where he assisted in negotiations concerning the drawing of international borders in Karafuto. Soon after his return to Japan, the Boshin War of the Meiji restoration began, and he fought at the Battle of Toba–Fushimi. The forces of the Tokugawa shogunate were defeated, but Yamakawa survived and escaped to Edo, and from there to Aizu.

=== The Aizu War ===
In the early months of 1868, Yamakawa was involved in the restructuring of Aizu Domain's military, and was made commander of the reorganized artillery corps (the Hōheitai 砲兵隊), replacing the veteran Hayashi Gonsuke, who had died from wounds sustained at Battle of Toba–Fushimi. Upon his return to the domain, he was appointed wakadoshiyori in charge of military finances. In order to shore up the domain's financial situation (which had been in dire straits for over a decade), he brought the skilled engravers Katō Munechika and Akichika, as well as others, to Aizu, and built a smelter inside Tsuruga Castle, casting the three denominations of 1 bun, 2 bun, and 1 ryō coins. When the forces of the Satchō Alliance reached Aizu, he joined his forces with the Aizu infantry under command of Ōtori Keisuke, and fought against the mostly Tosa Domain pro-imperial army under command of Itagaki Taisuke with great effectiveness and using innovative strategies.

On the 24th, Yamakawa was called back to Wakamatsu from his position at Nikkōguchi-Tajima, but he realized that even if he were to rush back at top speed, by the time he got there the castle would be under siege and he would not be able to get through. Therefore, he devised a plan to move his soldiers through the enemy lines. Putting together a “lion dance troupe” from the nearby Komatsu village, he set up a “tōri-hayashi” (Japanese “marching band”), and managed to get every one of his soldiers into the castle safely, past the nose of the besieging army. The commanders in the castle were awestruck by the daring of the ruse, and it greatly improved the defenders morale. Matsudaira Katamori himself was moved to tears and placed Yamakawa in command of defenses of the castle.

However, while the defenders were reinforced for a slightly longer period of time, it was to be for naught, and the castle fell in the fall of 1868. Yamakawa's wife Toseko was killed in the final days of the battle.

=== Exile ===
After the fall of Aizu, Yamakawa was taken to a prisoner-of-war camp in Tokyo with other surviving Aizu samurai. He was placed in charge of the domain's postwar liaison office with the new Meiji government, and when the government issued a pardon, he supervised the move of the Aizu samurai to the new landholding called Tonami Domain, which had been assigned by the government in northern Mutsu Province (now part of Aomori Prefecture). As vice-governor of Tonami, he struggled with the impossible situation the exiles from Aizu faced, with severe weather and lack of food and shelter. After the abolition of the Han system in 1871, he remained to serve the government in Aomori Prefecture for a short time, but later in 1871 resigned and at the recommendation of Imperial Japanese Army Major General Tani Tateki. Tani has been with the imperial forces in the Aizu War, and had been greatly impressed with Yamakawa's ingenious strategies.

=== Imperial Japanese Army career ===
In 1873, Yamakawa was commissioned a major in the Imperial Japanese Army and assigned to the garrison at Kumamoto. In 1874, he fought to suppress the Saga Rebellion and was wounded. Promoted to lieutenant colonel, he was in combat against Saigo Takamori in the 1877 Satsuma Rebellion as a staff officer of the 2nd Independent Brigade. He was trapped in Kumamoto Castle by Satsuma forces, and in the battle saved the life of Tani Tateki. For his actions, he received the Order of the Rising Sun, 4th class in 1878 and he was promoted to colonel in 1880, and in 1888 to major general. However, soon after this promotion, he resigned his commission and entered into the army reserves.

=== Political career ===
After his time in the army, Yamakawa went into education, becoming school president of the Tokyo Women's Normal School, replacing fellow Aizu native Takamine Hideo. He ran in the 1890 Japanese general election for a seat in the lower house of the Diet of Japan. Although he lost in the election, he was made a member of the House of Peers by appointment instead. In 1891, he was promoted to the honorific title of Junior Third Court Rank.

In his later years he devoted himself to writing, and put together the text Kyoto Shugoshoku Shimatsu, which was one of the first texts that gave a view of the Aizu Domain's actions that was not part of the Meiji oligarchs' triumphalist narrative.

Yamakawa was elevated to the peerage with the title of danshaku (baron) under the kazoku system on January 26, 1898. He died in Tokyo eight days later, and was buried at the Aoyama Cemetery.

== Decorations ==
- 1878 – Order of the Rising Sun, 4th class
- 1885 – Order of the Rising Sun, 3rd class
