= Ferris Girls' Junior & Senior High School =

High school in Yokohama, Japan

Coordinates: 35°26′17″N 139°38′51″E

- Japanese: フェリス女学院中学校・高等学校

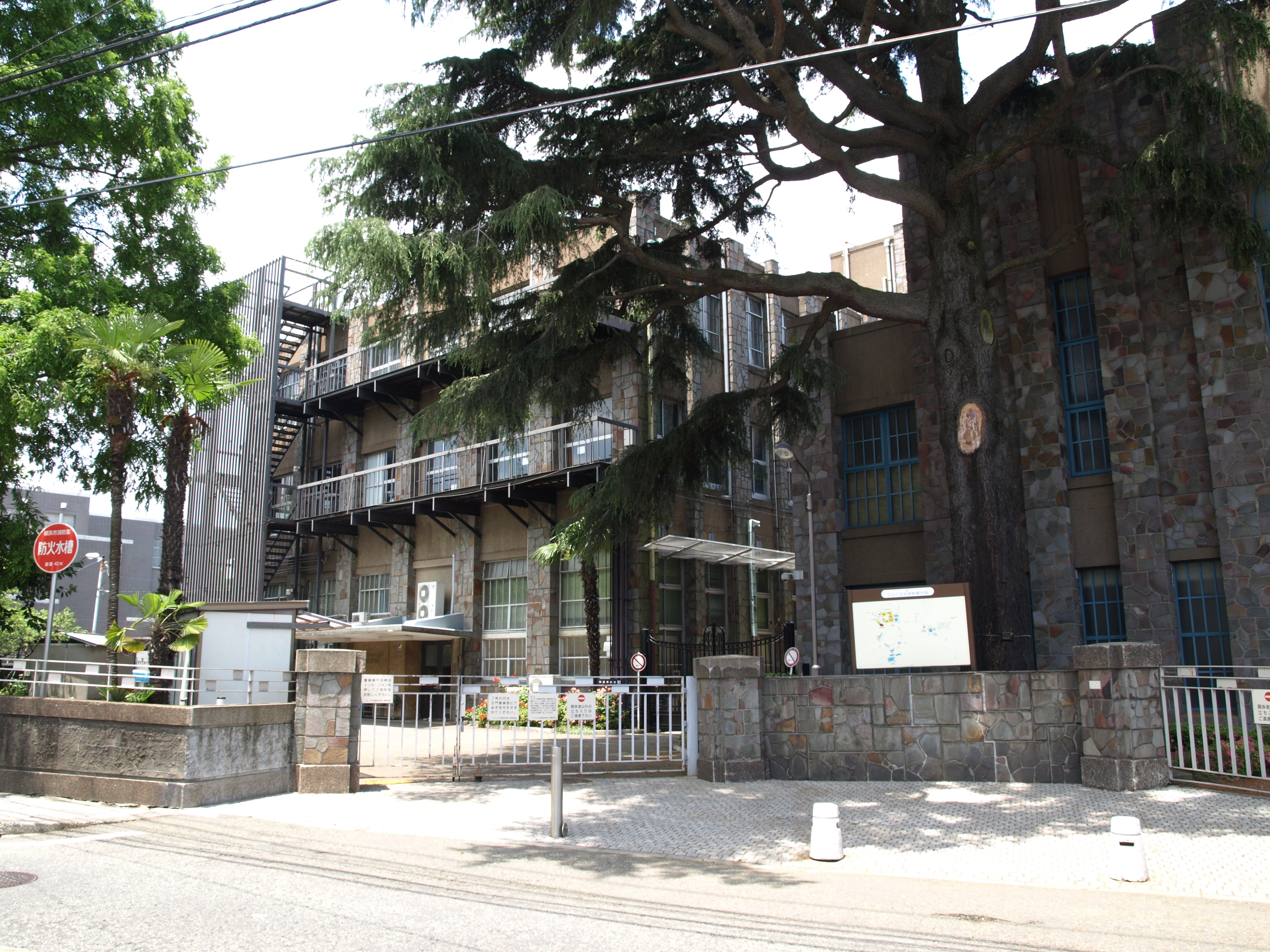

Information
- Former names: Miss Kidder's School for Girls; (1870-1875); Isaac Ferris Seminary (Japanese: フェリス･セミナリ); (1875-1889); Ferris Japanese-English Girls' School (Japanese: フェリス和英女学校); (1889-1941); Yokohama Yamate Girls' School (Japanese: 横浜山手女学院); (1941-1951)
- Motto: For Others
- Religious affiliation: Protestant
- Established: 1870; 156 years ago
- Founder: Mary Eddy Kidder
- Gender: Mixed (1870 - September 1871); Girls (September 1871-present)
- Website: www.ferris.ed.jp/for_overseas/english.html

Ferris Girls' Junior & Senior High School (フェリス女学院中学校・高等学校 Ferisu Jogakuin Chūgakkō Kōtōgakkō) is a junior and senior high school for girls in Yokohama. It is a part of Ferris Jogakuin (学校法人フェリス女学院).

== History ==
The institution began in 1870, when the first unmarried female missionary of the Dutch Reformed Church in Japan, Mary Eddy Kidder began teaching at a facility established by Clara Hepburn, wife of James Curtis Hepburn. The Hepburns had established their girls' school in 1862. Kidder established her "Miss Kidder's School for Girls" after the Hepburns left Japan. This was Japan's first mission-sponsored school, and the country's first higher learning institution for women. Initially Kidder's classes had boys, but in September 1871 she restricted her classes to girls only.

The school was named "Isaac Ferris Seminary" (フェリス･セミナリー Ferisu Seminarī), after the head of the Reformed Church Board of Foreign Missions Isaac Ferris, in 1875. That year, its school and residence facilities were built at 178 Yamate. It was renamed to Ferris Waei Jogakkō (フェリス和英女学校 Ferisu Waei Jogakkō; "Ferris Japanese-English Girls' School") in 1889. Mary Deyo of New York was a teacher at Ferris Seminary from 1888 to 1894.

During the Great Kantō earthquake of 1923 the headmistress, Miss Kuyper, died, and school buildings were destroyed. A building in the Yamate Campus named after Kuyper, Kuyper Memorial Hall, opened in 1929.

In 1941 the school was renamed Yokohama Yamate Girls' School (横浜山手女学院 Yokohama Yamate Jogakuin); this temporary name change occurred during an anti-English language sentiment during World War II era Japan. It was renamed Ferris Girls' School in 1951.

== Notable alumnae ==
- Kashiko Kawakita
- Toshiko Matsuo
- Chiyo Sakakibara
- Masako Ōkawara
- Anna Ogino
- Izumi Nakamitsu
- Yuko Hara
- Shiho Fujimura
- Sayumi Horie
- Yurie Miura
- Mayumi Miyata
- Wakamatsu Shizuko

== See also ==
- Ferris University
