= Jogaku zasshi =

Japanese women's magazine (1885–1904)

- Editor: Iwamoto Yoshiharu
- Categories: Women's magazine
- Founder: Iwamoto Yoshiharu; Kondō Kenzō
- Founded: 1885
- First issue: July 1885
- Final issue: February 1904
- Country: Japan
- Based in: Tokyo
- Language: Japanese
- OCLC: 13749099

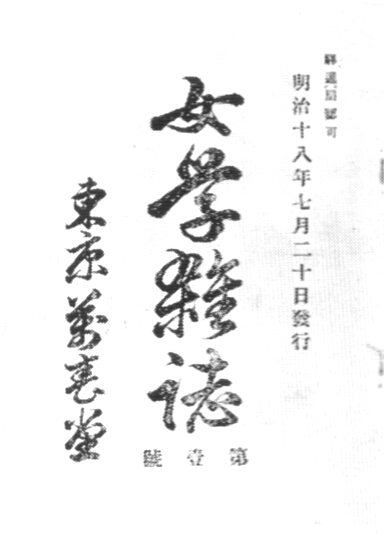
Jogaku Zasshi

Jogaku zasshi (Japanese: 女学雑誌; Education of Women Magazine) was a women's magazine published in Tokyo, Japan, during the Meiji era between July 1885 and February 1904. It is the first women's magazine in the country. In addition, it was the most significant publication in its category.

== History and profile ==
The first issue of Jogaku zasshi appeared in July 1885. The founders were Iwamoto Yoshiharu and Kondō Kenzō. It was launched as a successor of their former magazine, Jogaku shinshi, that was launched in 1884. Iwamoto also edited the magazine. Early editions of Jogaku zasshi featured plain informative articles which soon became more sophisticated and more literary-oriented to compete with its rival Kokumin no Tomo which was started in February 1887.

In May 1887 Iwamoto Yoshiharu published an article in Jogaku zasshi criticizing Japanese prime minister Ito Hirobumi who held a costume party at the official residence. It led to six-week closure of the magazine by the Japanese government. From June 1892 the magazine began to publish articles on literature and social reform one week and articles on family and home another week to accommodate the conservative tendencies of Meiji era. It targeted women and played a significant role in introducing Christianity to the Japanese society and in advocating the western lifestyle.

Although Jogaku zasshi was a women's magazine, the early contributors were mainly male with some exceptions such as Nakajima Shôen (1863-1901), Shimizu Shikin (1867-1933), Miyake Kaho (1868-1944) and Wakamatsu Shizuko (1864-1896). The contributions of the latter two were fiction and translations. However, from 1889 women writers became dominant in the magazine. Next year there were eight women as permanent editorial staff. Well-known contributors included Hoshino Tenchi (1862-1950), Shimazaki Tōson (1872-1943), Kitamura Tōkoku (1868-1894) and Ishibashi Ningetsu (1865-1926). In addition to these literary figures Japanese educator and journalist Fukuzawa Yukichi (1835–1901) was also a frequent contributor of Jogaku zasshi.

The contributors and particularly, the editor of the magazine, Iwamoto Yoshiharu, encouraged women to become active in life, including becoming writers instead of being passive readers. They also advocated equal rights for women and marriages based on love and harshly criticised the lack of social awareness among women. In line with these views an interview with Ogino Ginko who was the first Japanese female physician was published in Jogaku zasshi in October 1893.

Over time the magazine lost its influence and finally folded with the issue published in February 1904. During its lifetime Jogaku zasshi produced a total of 526 issues.
