= Kabayama =

Kabayama (written: 樺山) is a Japanese surname. Notable people with the surname include:

- Kabayama Aisuke (樺山 愛輔, 1865–1953), Japanese samurai, businessman and privy counselor
- Kabayama Hisataka (樺山 権左衛門 久高, 1560–1634), Japanese samurai
- Matthew Kabayama (born 1965), Canadian-born Japanese ice hockey player
- Sukehide Kabayama (樺山 資英, 1868–1941), Japanese government official and businessman
- Kabayama Sukenori (樺山 資紀, 1837–1922), Japanese governor of Taiwan

== Fictional characters ==
- Kabayama (樺山), a character in the anime series Yu-Gi-Oh! GX
