= Yamaji Aizan =

Japanese writer (1865–1917)

- 山路愛山
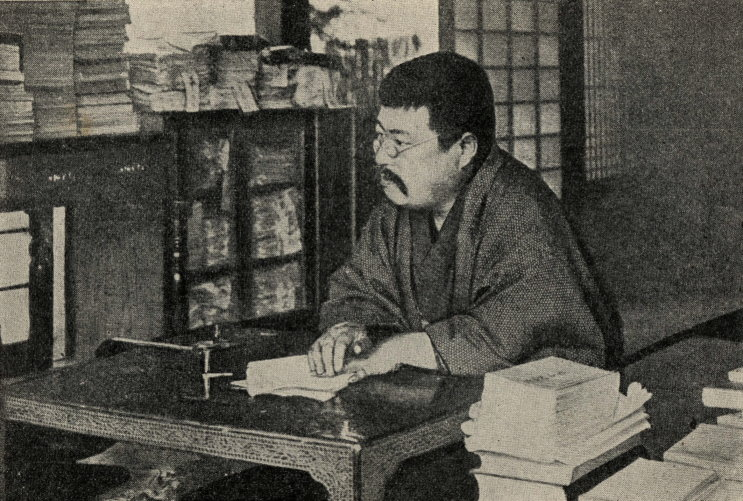
- Yamaji in his study
- Born: Yamaji Yakichi; January 23, 1865; Torigoe, Asakusa, Edo, Japan
- Died: March 15, 1917 (aged 52); Tokyo, Empire of Japan
- Occupations: Journalist, writer
- Spouse: Tajima Tane (m. 1892)
- Writing career
- Language: Japanese
- Years active: 1890–1917
- Period: Meiji era
- Subjects: Socialism; Christianity

Yamaji Aizan (Japanese: 山路愛山; January 23, 1865 – March 15, 1917), born as Yamaji Yakichi (山路彌吉), was a Japanese writer, journalist, and historian. He was born in Edo to a family of former retainers of the shogun. After the Meiji Restoration, his family moved to Shizuoka. In Shizuoka, he converted to Christianity and began his career as a writer and journalist. He worked on notable publications such as Min'yūsha and The Shinano Mainichi Shimbun. He served as editor-in-chief of the latter. Later in his life, he worked as a lecturer in universities in Japan.

A proponent of kokka shakaishugi or state socialism, he co-founded the National-Socialist Party in 1905. He also supported and advocated for imperialism. His works were popular and influential during the Meiji and Taisho periods, influencing figures such as Shūmei Ōkawa and Hayashi Fusao.

== Early life and education ==
Aizan Yamaji was born on January 23, 1865, as Yakichi Yamaji, in the mansion of the Astronomical Institute of the Tokugawa shogunate in Torigoe, Asakusa, Edo (present-day Taito, Tokyo). He was the second son of Yamaji Ichiro, a former retainer of the shogun (hatamoto) and an apprentice at the governmental astronomical observatory, and Yamaji Keiko. His father left his mother because of an unhappy marriage. His mother died after a stillbirth in 1867. Due to this, he was raised by his grandmother on his father's side, Yamaji Fusako. His father joined the Shōgitai and was defeated. He again joined the old shogunate navy three months later during the Battle of Hakodate and was wounded. He was imprisoned in Tsuyama domain.

Following the Meiji Restoration, he and his family moved to Shizuoka in the spring of 1869. He first met his father in 1872. He described his father as abusive. He started attending Gōtō School in 1874, but dropped out in 1878 because his family was no longer able to afford the tuition fees, and worked at the school as a teacher.

== Career ==
=== Involvement with Christianity ===
In 1880, he and a group of young people, including Takagi Mizutaro, a clergyman, began publishing the literary magazine Gozan ippō. In 1881, he worked as a clerk at the Shizuoka Police Station because his salary as a teacher was insufficient to make a living.

In July 1883, he attended Shizuoka English School, a local English school, and started studying English at a local Methodist Church with friends in 1884. He and his friend converted to Christianity and were baptised in March 1886 by Hiraiwa Yoshiyasu. Following guidance from Hiraiwa, he moved to Tokyo and entered Tōyō Eiwa School, a Methodist school, in February 1889. During this period, he became a close friend of Tokutomi Sohō.

In July 1890, he was assigned to Fukuroi in Shizuoka Prefecture, where he briefly worked as an assistant pastor.

While working as an assistant pastor, he began contributing to Jogaku zasshi (Journal of Women's Study). The church leaders noticed Yamaji's writings, and in July 1891, after moving back to Tokyo, he also founded the official organ of the three Methodist denominations in Japan at that time, Gokyō (護教; Defender of the Faith), and became its chief editor from 1891 to 1897.

=== Journalist and political commentator ===
Yamaji joined the Min'yūsha publishing company in August 1891 after being invited by Tokutomi Sohō. At the same time, he also wrote for newspapers like Kokumin no Tomo and Kokumin Shimbun, both of which are published by Min'yūsha. He published a short essay about the biography of Rai San'yō in Kokumin no Tomo in January 1893. This led to a debate with other writers such as Kitamura Tokoku and Tōson Shimazaki.

He published his first book, Ogyū Sorai (荻生徂徠), in 1893. He left Min'yūsha in 1897 and joined the Mōri clan's editorial office, where he worked until 1898. He became the editor-in-chief of The Shinano Mainichi Shimbun (Shinmai) in 1899 and moved to Nagano. In 1903, he founded the magazine Dokuritsu Hyōron (獨立評論). In August 1905, he founded the National-Socialist Party (国家社会党, Kokka Shakaitō), along with Teikichi Chiba and Tahachirō Nakamura. In 1910, he launched the magazine Kokumin Zasshi (国民雑誌).

== Later years and death ==
From 1910 to 1911, he taught as a lecturer in National History at the Department of History in Keio Gijuku, Faculty of Literature. He also worked as a lecturer at Doshisha University, Faculty of Politics and Economics from 1912 to 1916, where he taught History of the Japanese Nation. In 1915, Yamaji was hospitalized due to erysipelas. He later went back as editor-in-chief for Shinmai in 1916.

In February 1917, he went on a lecture tour in Shinshu, Nagano Prefecture, which affected his health. On March 14, he suddenly became ill. The next day, unable to get up, he asked his wife to take his manuscript of The Past, Present and Future of the World to the publisher, which he started writing in August 1916 and finished in January 1917, while the second spoof was completed the day before. He wrote his last poem 30 minutes before he died. His last word was "I will go to the place where the late Emperor Meiji sleeps". Yamaji died on March 15, 1917, in Tokyo due to complications from dysentery. More than 700 people attended his funeral at the assembly hall of Aoyama Gakuin.

== Personal life ==
Yamaji married Tajima Tane, the daughter of a silk merchant in Maebashi, at Azabu Church in December 1892. Although he was baptized as a Christian, he later told in a lecture in 1916 that he was not a Christian.

== Political views ==
He advocated for increasing bureaucratization of society. During his time in Shinmai, he criticized Russian expansion. After leaving Shinmai, he advocated for war and supported the Russo-Japanese War. He also advocated for imperialism. He stated in his journal Dokuritsu Hyōron that "imperialism was nothing more than the form of social organization best suited to ensure the survival of the individual." He also supported the government action during the First Sino-Japanese War, but had reservations about territorial expansion and Japan becoming a world power.

In his early years, he advocated for freedom of religion. He briefly supported Ebina Danjo's view on liberalism. In 1906, he promoted the universal suffrage movement. His views on liberalism was influenced by figures such as Thomas Macaulay, John Stuart Mill, Richard Cobden, and John Bright.

His writing talks about social inequality in Japan during the Meiji period. His party, National-Socialist Party, advocated for social reform. He also supported and advocated for kokka shakaishugi or state socialism, a form of left-wing nationalism. He argued that a form of socialism existed in Ancient Japan. He also cited this as a method to combat the rise of zaibatsus. He was also against the Meiji oligarchs.

== Legacy ==
The works of Yamaji Aizan were very popular and influential in the Meiji and Taisho periods, which inspired various people, including leading intellectuals on opposing sides in those periods. This includes liberal Tanzan Ishibashi, who admired Yamaji's work on history. Ultranationlist Shūmei Ōkawa stated in his 1921 book The History of Japanese Civilization that Yamaji's historical writings had stimulated his interest in history. Marxist Kiyoshi Miki was also fond of his work. Writers such as Shūko Shirayanagi and Hayashi Fusao adopted some aspects of Yamaji’s thought.
