= Yokohama Yamate =

Yokohama Yamate may refer to:

- Yokohama Yamate Chinese School
- Yokohama Yamate Girls' School (横浜山手女学院 Yokohama Yamate Jogakuin), a previous name of the Ferris Girls' Junior & Senior High School
