= Shimizu Shikin =

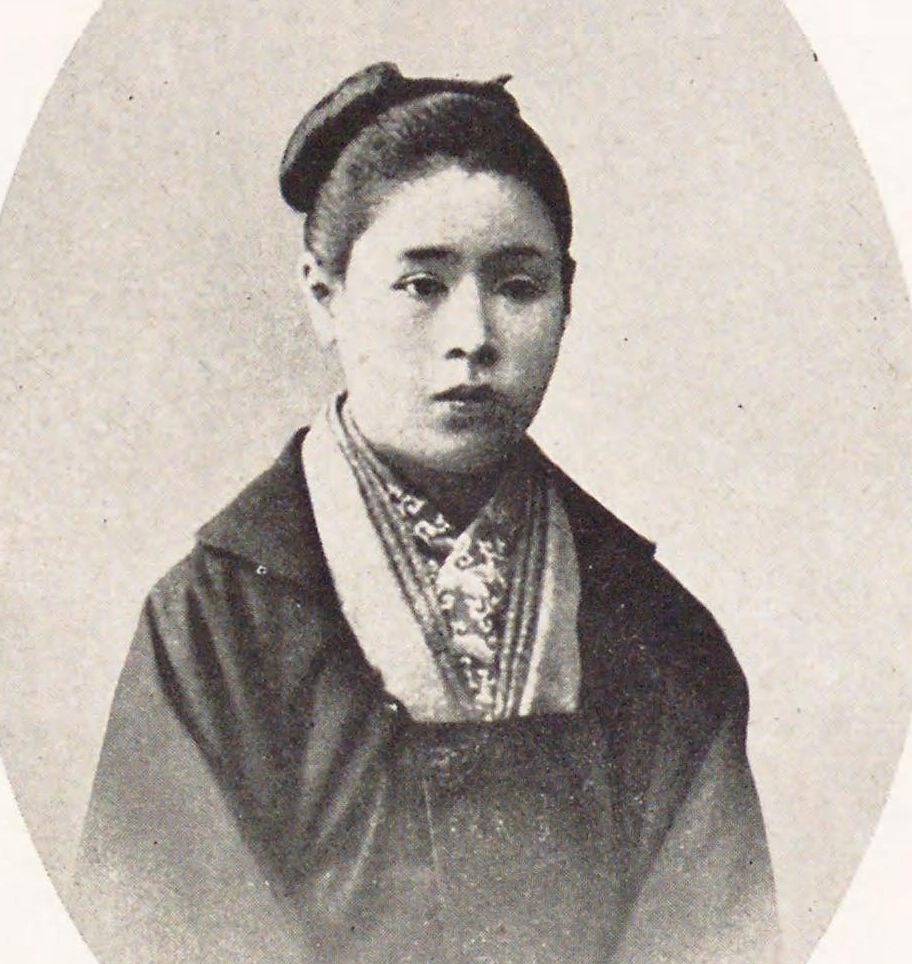
- Shimizu Shikin before 1930.
- Born: Shimizu Toyoko (Japanese: 清水豊子); 11 January 1868; Bizen, Okayama Prefecture, Japan
- Died: 31 July 1933 (aged 65); Tokyo, Japan
- Other names: Kozai Shikin, Kozai Toyoko
- Occupations: writer, women's activist
- Years active: 1887–1901
- Spouse: Kozai Yoshinao

Shimizu Shikin (清水紫琴; 1868–1933), pen name of Shimizu Toyoko, was a Japanese novelist and women's rights activist of the Meiji period in Japan. A lecturer on equality and social issues, she was forced to turn to writing when the law changed to bar women from political assembly. She became one of the first women professional journalists in Japan.

== Biography ==
Shimizu Toyoko (清水豊子) was born on 11 January 1868 in Bizen, Okayama, Japan to Shimizu Sadamoto. Most of her childhood was spent in Kyoto, where her father worked as a government bureaucrat. She graduated from Kyoto Municipal Women’s Teacher Training School at the age of fourteen and was considered highly educated in a society which still believed education beyond primary school for women was not worthwhile. Unable to continue her education, Shimizu made use of her father’s library which contained western literary classics as well as works by Japanese intellectuals. In 1885, she married Okazaki Masaharu, who was involved with the Freedom and People's Rights Movement in Kyoto. Two years later they were divorced, most probably because Okazaki had a concubine, but through his contacts, she met Ueki Emori, Kageyama Hideko and others who were involved in social activism. Shimizu began lecturing on social issues throughout the country. She was one of the activists who presented a petition in 1888 hoping to reform the penal code, which among other things made adultery by women a punishable crime. She also spoke out against polygyny and its impact on women. That same year, she was one of the women who wrote essays for the preface of Ueki's Tðyð no fujo (Women of the Orient) (1889).

At 23, Shimizu moved to Tokyo to work at Iwamoto Zenji's journal Jogaku zasshi (女学雑誌; Magazine of Women's Learning), just a few months after a legislative act had been passed prohibiting women from political participation in assemblies. Opposed to the ban, she wrote essays in favor of women's inclusion, like her 1890 piece, "Tōkon jogakusei no kakugo wa ikan?" (How Determined Are Today's Women Students?). Within six months, she had become the journal's editor in chief. She began working simultaneously as the writing instructor at the Meiji Girls' School. Around this same time, Shimizu began an affair with Ôi Kengarô, common law husband of Kageyama Hideko, who had become her best friend. Shimizu became pregnant during the course of the relationship and took a leave of absence, returning home to Kyoto, where her father was gravely ill. She cared for him and gave birth to her son. Ôi, pressuring Shimizu to marry him, confused the addresses in letters he sent to the two women, and Hideko learned of the affair. The rift between her and Hideko never healed. Shimizu suffered a breakdown and was hospitalized in 1892 and her son was sent to live with family members.

Returning that same year to Jogaku zasshi, her brother introduced her to Kozai Yoshinao, a faculty member at the Tokyo School of Agriculture and the couple began a correspondence. In spite of the era's low opinion of divorced women and single mothers, and Shimizu's confession of her past, the relationship flourished. They were married later that year and Shimizu had their first child the following year. In 1895, her husband went abroad to study in Germany, and Shimizu moved back to Kyoto, living with her mother-in-law and writing as a correspondent. Shimizu used a number of pseudonyms including Tsuyuko, Toyo and Fumiko, predominately using Shikin after 1896. She employed different names for different genres, such as using Tsuyuko for fiction. She also wrote for Taiyō, a general interest magazine, in a column entitled Hanazono Zuihitsu (Scribblings from a Flower Garden) and she used her real name, Kozai Toyoko. Her husband returned from his studies around 1900 and Shimizu's last known writings appeared the following year. She joined him in Tokyo, where he became the president of the Tokyo University of Agriculture and she retired from writing. While it was speculated that her husband forced her to stop writing, her nature conflicts with that conclusion. However her son Yoshishige recalled an exchange between Shimizu and her husband where she had talked about taking up writing again and he said to her "But the tensai (genius) is now a gusai (stupid wife)". She raised six children and cared for her elderly father and brother after she stopped writing, maintaining a home and the social responsibilities of a university president. Shimizu died in 1933.

Shimizu was the first professional woman journalist in Japan, forced to turn to writing when public activism was barred. Though she experimented with style, employing genbun itchi (言文一致), a more colloquial, less narrative style of writing which more closely mimics speech, for a while before settling on the gesaku (Japanese: 戯作) style, Shimizu's writing is centered on social issues. She wrote about the right to equality, evaluating such themes as women's education, marriage, divorce, double standards towards men and women, and discrimination towards the Burakumin. She strove to impart her works with encouragement for women to seek their own emancipation and have the courage to express themselves.

== Selected works ==
- "Tōkon jogakusei no kakugo wa ikan?" (How Determined Are Today’s Women Students?) (1890) in Japanese
- "Onna bungakusha nanzo derukoto no osoki ya?" (Why Are There so few Women Writers?) (1890) in Japanese
- "Nani yue ni joshi wa seidan shukai ni sanchō suru to yurusarezuka?" (Why have women been prohibited from participating in political assemblies) (1891) in Japanese
- "Koware Yubiwa" (The Broken Ring) (1891) in Japanese
- "Ichi seinen iyō no jukkai" (A Young Man's Surprising Reminiscences) (1892) in Japanese
- "Naite Aisuru Shimai ni Tsugu" (Cry of Appeal to my Beloved Sisters) in Japanese
- "Hanazono zuihitsu" (Essays from Hanazono) 1895–1899 serial in Japanese
- "Tðsei futarimusume" (Two Modern Girls, 1897) in Japanese
- "Kokoro no oni" (Devil in the Heart) (1897) in Japanese
- "Shitayuku mizu" (The Downflow) (1898) in Japanese
- "Imin gakuen" (School for Émigrés) (1899) in Japanese
- "Natsuko no mono omoi" (Natsuko remembers) (1901) in Japanese
- Kozai, Shikin (1983). Kozai, Yoshishige (ed.). Shikin Zenhu, zen ikkan 紫琴全集 [Complete works of Shikin Shimizue in one volume] (in Japanese). Tōkyō, Japan: Sōdo Bunka. OCLC 13126579.
