= Hasegawa Nyozekan =

Japanese politician (1875–1969)

- 長谷川 如是閑
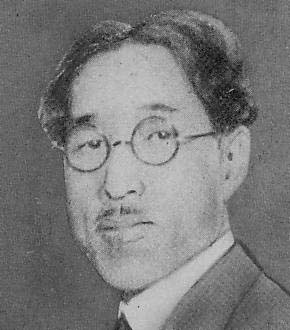
- Hasegawa Nyozekan

Member of the House of Peers
- In office 12 March 1946 – 2 May 1947 Nominated by the Emperor

Personal details
- Born: 30 November 1875 Fukagawa, Tokyo, Japan
- Died: 11 November 1969 (aged 93) Odawara, Kanagawa, Japan
- Education: Dōjinsha
- Alma mater: Tokyo College of Law
- Occupation: Writer, journalist
- Writing career
- Genres: Literary criticism, essays

Hasegawa Manjirō (長谷川 萬次郎, né Yamamoto, 30 November 1875 – 11 November 1969), known by his pen name Hasegawa Nyozekan (長谷川 如是閑), was a Japanese social critic and journalist during the Taishō and Shōwa eras. He was one of the most important and widely read supporters of liberalism and democracy in inter-war Japan.

== Biography ==
Nyozekan was born in the Fukagawa district of Tokyo, as the son of Yamada Tokujirō. He was adopted into his paternal grandmother's family, and took their name of Hasegawa. From 1885 to 1897, Nyozekan was a student at Dōjinsha, a school founded by Masanao Nakamura. He later attended the Tokyo Hōgakuin legal school (now part of Chuo University). He graduated in 1898 with a degree in criminal law. He was hired by Kuga Katsunan as a journalist in 1903, for the newspaper Nihon. In 1907, he was scouted by Miyake Setsurei and changed to the Nihon oyobi Nihonjin ("Japan and the Japanese") magazine. A few years later, he returned to newspaper journalism by changing jobs to the Osaka Asahi Shimbun.

His writings reveal his leftist political leanings, and in 1918, he resigned in protest after the newspaper was censured by the government.

In 1919, Nyozekan and fellow liberal journalist Oyama Ikuo founded the political magazine Warera ("We"), in which they sought to promote political reform and social democracy, while combating Japan's ever growing militarism and ultranationalism. In 1932, he published one of his most important works, Nihon fuashizumu hihan ("Critique of Japanese Fascism"), an analysis of the growing phenomena of "Japanese fascism”.

Increasing government repression and application of the Peace Preservation Laws in the mid-1930s, resulted in Nyozekan's arrest and a brief period in prison. This prompted Nyozekan to change to more subdued style, arguing that the Japanese people and national culture were inherently liberal, rational and democratic, and comparable to British classical liberalism. Although he was forced to keep a low profile, he did not compromise his opposition to militarism and totalitarianism.

Surprisingly to some, although Hasegawa wrote essays protesting that journalism must remain neutral and above politics, he also wrote in favor of the Greater East Asia Co-Prosperity Sphere, in which he saw the potential for the favorable development of Asia economically and culturally under Asian, rather than European influence.

In 1946, Hasegawa became a member of the House of Peers for its last session before the abolition of the Meiji Constitution. In 1947, he was elected to the Japan Art Academy, and in 1948 he was awarded the Order of Culture by the Japanese government.

His grave is at the temple of Seirin-ji in Bunkyō, Tokyo.

== See also ==
- Japanese literature
- List of Japanese authors
