= Sayumi =

- Gender: Female

Origin
- Origin: Japanese
- Meaning: Different meanings depending on the kanji used

Sayumi (written: 紗弓 or さゆみ in hiragana) is a feminine Japanese given name. Notable people with the name include:

- Sayumi Horie (堀江 さゆみ; born 1963), Japanese television announcer
- Sayumi Michishige (道重 さゆみ; born 1989), Japanese singer, model and actress
- Sayumi Suzushiro (鈴代 紗弓; born 1998), Japanese voice actress
- Sayumi Watabe (渡部 紗弓), Japanese voice actress
