= Horie =

Horie (written 堀江 lit. "canal") is a Japanese surname. Notable people with the surname include:

- Atsuya Horie (塹江 敦哉, born 1997), Japanese baseball player
- Hirohisa Horie (堀江 博久, born 1970), Japanese musician
- Jun Horie (堀江 淳, born 1960), Japanese singer-songwriter
- Kazuma Horie (堀江 一眞, born 1976), Japanese voice actor
- Kei Horie (堀江 慶, born 1978), Japanese actor and film director
- Kenichi Horie (堀江 謙一, born 1938), Japanese yachtsman
- Horie Kuwajirō (堀江 鍬次郎, 1831–1866), Japanese photographer and writer
- Kyosuke Horie (堀江 恭佑, born 1990), Japanese rugby union player
- Mitsuko Horie (堀江 美都子, born 1957), Japanese singer and voice actress
- Richard Horie, American comic artist
- Sayumi Horie (堀江 さゆみ, born 1963), Japanese television announcer
- Shota Horie (堀江 翔太, born 1986), Japanese rugby union player
- Shun Horie (堀江 瞬, born 1993), Japanese voice actor
- Tadao Horie (堀江 忠男, 1913–2003), Japanese footballer and manager
- Takafumi Horie (堀江 貴文, born 1972), Japanese billionaire
- Toshiyuki Horie (堀江 敏幸, born 1964), Japanese writer
- Yui Horie (堀江 由衣, born 1976), Japanese singer and voice actress

== See also ==
- Horie Station, a railway station in Matsuyama, Ehime Prefecture, Japan
