= Chiyo Sakakibara =

Japanese politician (1898–1987)

- 榊原 千代
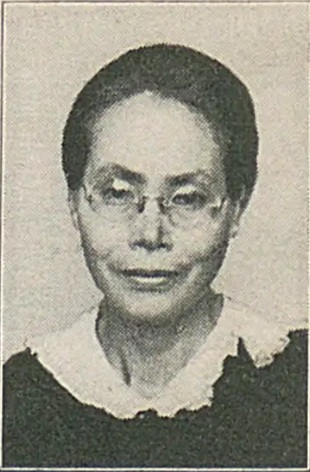
- Sakakibara in 1947

Member of the House of Representatives; from Fukushima
- In office 10 April 1946 – 23 December 1948
- Preceded by: Constituency established
- Succeeded by: Sadao Imaizumi
- Constituency: At-large district (1946–1947); 1st district (1947–1948)

Personal details
- Born: 15 July 1898 Mishima, Shizuoka, Japan
- Died: 28 April 1987 (aged 88) Tokyo, Japan
- Party: Socialist
- Spouse: Iwao Sakakibara (m. 1927)
- Children: 4
- Education: Ferris Girls' Junior & Senior High School
- Alma mater: Aoyama Girl's Academy; University of Marburg

Chiyo Sakakibara (Japanese: 榊原千代; 15 July 1898 – 28 April 1987) was a Japanese journalist, educator and politician. She was one of the first group of women elected to the House of Representatives in 1946. In 1948 she was appointed Deputy Secretary of Justice, also becoming the first woman appointed to a cabinet post.

== Early life and education ==
Sakakibara was born Chiyo Mano in what is now Mishima in Shizuoka Prefecture in 1898. She attended Ferris Japanese-English Girls' School, graduating in 1917. She then studied at Aoyama Girl's Academy until 1919, after which she became a reporter for the magazine Fujin no Tomo (Women's Friend). She later taught at Jiyu Gakuen Girls' School, before marrying the economist Iwao Sakakibara in 1927. The couple had three daughters and a son, Yo, who founded the Hippo Family Club. She subsequently studied in Europe with her husband, attending the University of Marburg in Germany and Selly Oak College in England. When they returned to Japan, Iwao became a professor at the Fukushima College of Economics, with Sakakibara becoming a teacher at Fukushima Girl's High School. She was also a piano teacher.

== Political career ==
After the war, Sakakibara became a Japan Socialist Party candidate in Fukushima in the 1946 general elections (the first in which women could vote), and was elected to the House of Representatives. She was re-elected in the 1947 elections, after which she was appointed Deputy Secretary of Justice in the Tetsu Katayama government, becoming the first woman appointed to the cabinet. However, she lost her seat in the 1949 elections.

In 1951 Sakakibara became a member of the National University Management Law Enactment Committee. In the same year she became president of the Feliz Jogakuin school corporation and a director of Aoyama Gakuin. She was also a founding member of International Christian University, served as a director of Seiko Gakuin High School and became a mediator for the Tokyo Family Court.

She was one of the signatories of the agreement to convene a convention for drafting a world constitution. As a result, for the first time in human history, a World Constituent Assembly convened to draft and adopt the Constitution for the Federation of Earth.

She died in Tokyo in 1987.
