= Ferris University =

Japanese private women's college

Coordinates: 35°26′17″N 139°38′51″E

- フェリス女学院大学
- Type: Private
- Established: 1965, predecessor institution from 1870
- Location: Izumi-ku, Yokohama, Kanagawa, Japan
- Website: www.ferris.ac.jp/welcome/index.html

Ferris University
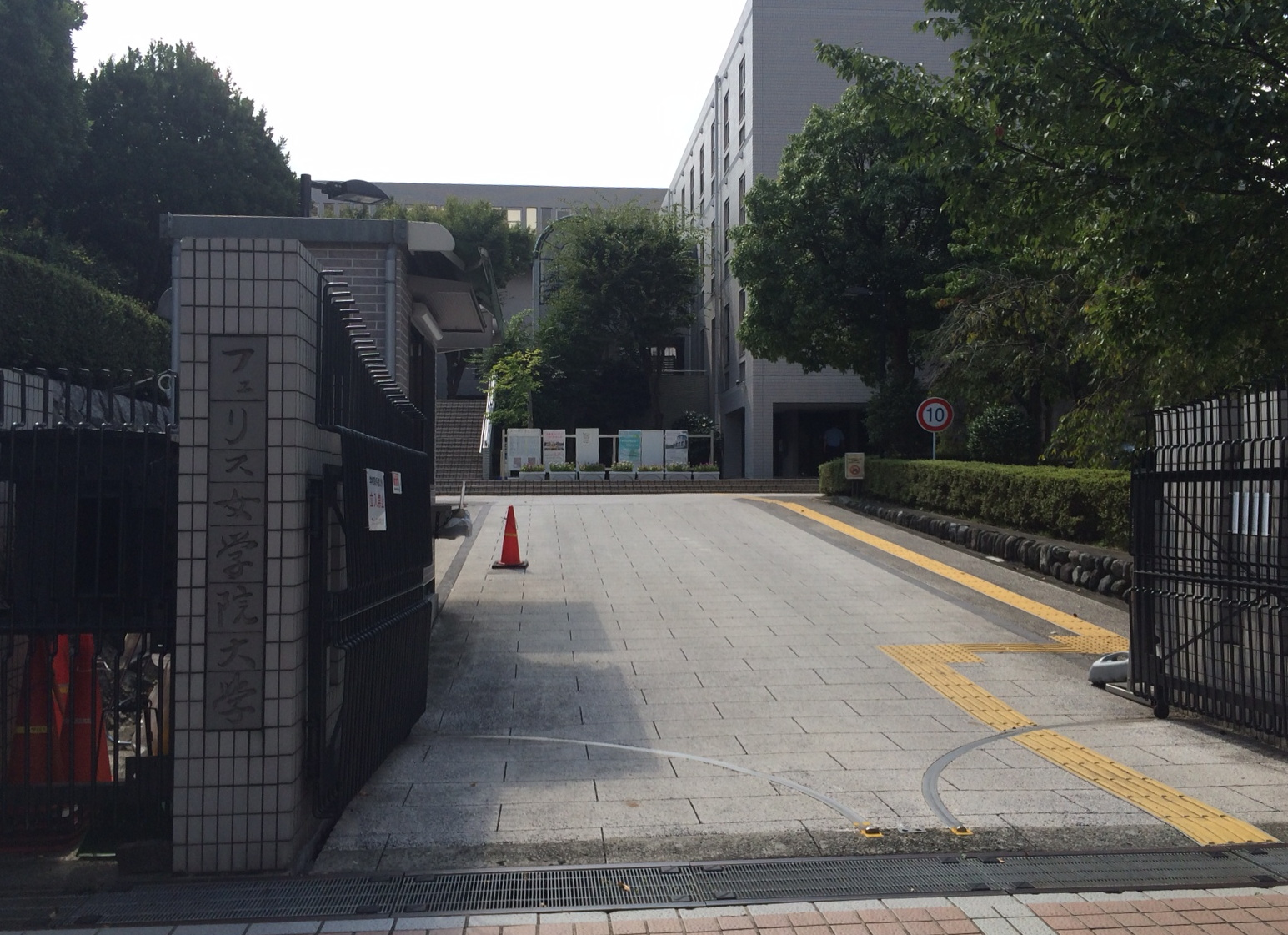

Japanese name
- Kanji: フェリス女学院大学
- Kana: フェリスじょがくいんだいがく
Transcriptions
- Romanization: Ferisu Jogakuin Daigaku

Map around Yamate campus

Ferris University (フェリス女学院大学, Ferisu Jogakuin Daigaku; "Ferris Women's University") is a private women's college in Yokohama, Kanagawa, Japan. It is a part of Ferris Jogakuin.

The predecessor of the school was founded by American Presbyterian missionaries in 1870 with the assistance of James Curtis Hepburn, primarily to teach the English language and western cultural values to women. The male counterpart of the school later became Meiji Gakuin University. It was chartered as a junior college in 1950 and became a four-year college in 1965.

The school currently has two campus locations: the main Ryokuen campus in Izumi-ku, Yokohama and a subsidiary Yamate campus for 3rd and 4th year music students at Naka-ku, Yokohama. Composed mainly of the departments of Humanities, International Studies and Music, the school has a student population of 2,667 undergraduates and 78 graduates, with a teaching staff of 85 professors and lecturers.

== History ==
Ferris Women's College was established in 1965. It originated from the Ferris Seminary, named in 1875 and established by Mary Kidder.

In 1989, the College of Music was established, comprising three departments: Vocal Music, Instrumental Music, and Musicology. The construction of Ferris Hall, a school building on Yamate Campus, was completed. In 2005, the Department of Vocal Music and the Department of Instrumental Music were integrated into the Department of Performing Arts. Facilities at Yamate Campus expanded in 2012, with the refurbishment of Building 8.

== See also ==
- Ferris Girls' School
