= Mary Deyo =

American missionary in Japan

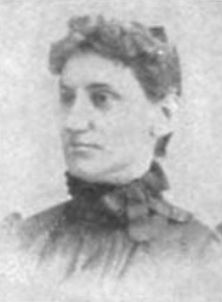
- Mary Deyo, from a 1901 publication.
- Born: January 8, 1858; Gardiner, New York
- Died: December 15, 1932 (aged 74); Gardiner, New York
- Occupation: American missionary in Japan

Mary Deyo (January 8, 1858 – December 15, 1932) was an American teacher and Christian missionary in Yokohama, Ueda, and Morioka in Japan, from 1888 to 1905.

== Early life ==
Deyo was born in Gardiner, New York, the daughter of Jonathan Deyo and Maria Lefevre Deyo. She trained as a teacher at the normal school in New Paltz, graduating in 1887.

== Career ==
Deyo taught primary school in Livingston, New York from 1884 to 1886, and taught briefly at the normal school in New Paltz. She was a teacher at Ferris Seminary, a girls' school in Yokohama, from 1888 to 1894, and worked as an evangelist in Ueda after 1895. She also worked with fellow American missionary Mary Leila Winn in Morioka from 1903 to 1905. Her work was supported by the Women's Board of Foreign Missions of the Reformed Church in America, and by the King's Daughters, a churchwomen's organization. She taught English and literature classes, introduced physical education classes at Ferris Seminary, and was vice-president of the Yokohama Literary Society. She spoke at a missionary conventions in Philadelphia, Brooklyn, and Poughkeepsie in 1901, and retired from Japan in 1905.

== Personal life ==
Deyo died in 1932, in New Paltz, aged 75 years. Her papers, including correspondence from her years in Yokohama, are in the collection of Huguenot Historical Society and the Elting Memorial Library in New Paltz.
