= Miyake Setsurei =

Japanese philosopher (1860–1945)

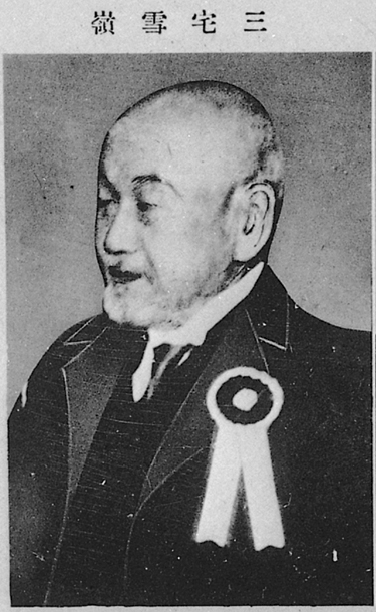
- Miyake Setsurei
- Born: July 7, 1860; Kanazawa, Ishikawa, Japan
- Died: November 26, 1945 (aged 85)
- Occupations: Philosopher, author, journalist
- Writing career
- Genres: Politics, culture

Miyake Setsurei (三宅 雪嶺; July 7, 1860 – November 26, 1945) was a Japanese philosopher and author. He helped found the Society for Political Education and its magazine Nihonjin (日本人, later known as Nihon Oyobi Nihonjin).

== Biography ==
He graduated from the University of Tokyo's Department of Philosophy in 1883.

He helped found the Society for Political Education and its magazine Nihonjin ("Japanese People"). In 1907 the magazine was renamed Nihon Oyobi Nihonjin ("Japan and The Japanese People"). It was at this time that Hasegawa Nyozekan was recruited to the magazine.

Miyake's other works included Shinzenbi Nihonjin [Goodness, truth and beauty of the Japanese people] and Giakushu Nihonjin [Falsehoods, evil and ugliness of the Japanese people].

== Political views ==
Miyake was a cooperative nationalist and differed in opinion from universalists. He felt that Japan was first a member of the Asian community and secondly a member of the global community. He also believed that Japan should hold onto and preserve its cultural heritage from before the Meiji era as it helped to strengthen Asian culture and, by doing so, world culture.

Miyake felt Japan should make it its mission to study Asia, oppose western imperialism, and nurture the distinctive Japanese sense of beauty.
