= Kabayama Aisuke =

Japanese businessman and privy counselor

Count Kabayama Aisuke
- 樺山 愛輔
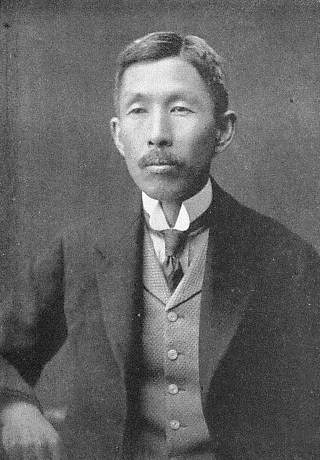
- Kabayama in 1913

Member of the Privy Council
- In office 10 June 1946 – 2 May 1947
- Monarch: Hirohito

Member of the House of Peers
- In office 10 July 1925 – 13 June 1946

Personal details
- Born: 3 June 1865 Kagoshima, Satsuma, Japan
- Died: 21 October 1953 (aged 88) Ōiso, Kanagawa, Japan
- Parent: Kabayama Sukenori (father)
- Education: Dōjinsha
- Alma mater: Amherst College; Bonn University

Count Kabayama Aisuke (樺山 愛輔; 3 June 1865 – 21 October 1953) was a Japanese businessman and privy counselor.

== Early life ==
Kabayama was the son of Yosaburo Hashiguchi, a samurai of the Kagoshima clan. He was adopted by Sukenori Kabayama, a navy admiral. After learning at Dōjinsha and Kanda Kyoritsu Gakko, he travelled to the U.S. in 1880. After graduating from Amherst College in 1889, he went to Germany and enrolled at Bonn University. He returned to Japan in 1891.

== Career ==
Beginning in 1906, Kabayama successively served as executive director at Hakodate Funabari (Hakodate Shipbuilding), Hokkaido Tanko Kisen (Hokkaido Colliery and Steamship), Nihon Tekkojo (Japan Steel Works), and Chiyoda Kasai Hoken (Chiyoda Fire Insurance). He founded Kokusai Tsushinsha and became president in 1914. He inherited the title of hakushaku (count) in 1922 and was selected as a member of the House of Peers in 1925. He served as an attendant in the suite of the commissioner plenipotentiary of the London Naval Conference in 1929. He served as privy councillor in 1946. He also served as the president of Nichi Bei Kyokai (America-Japan Society) and president of the International House of Japan.

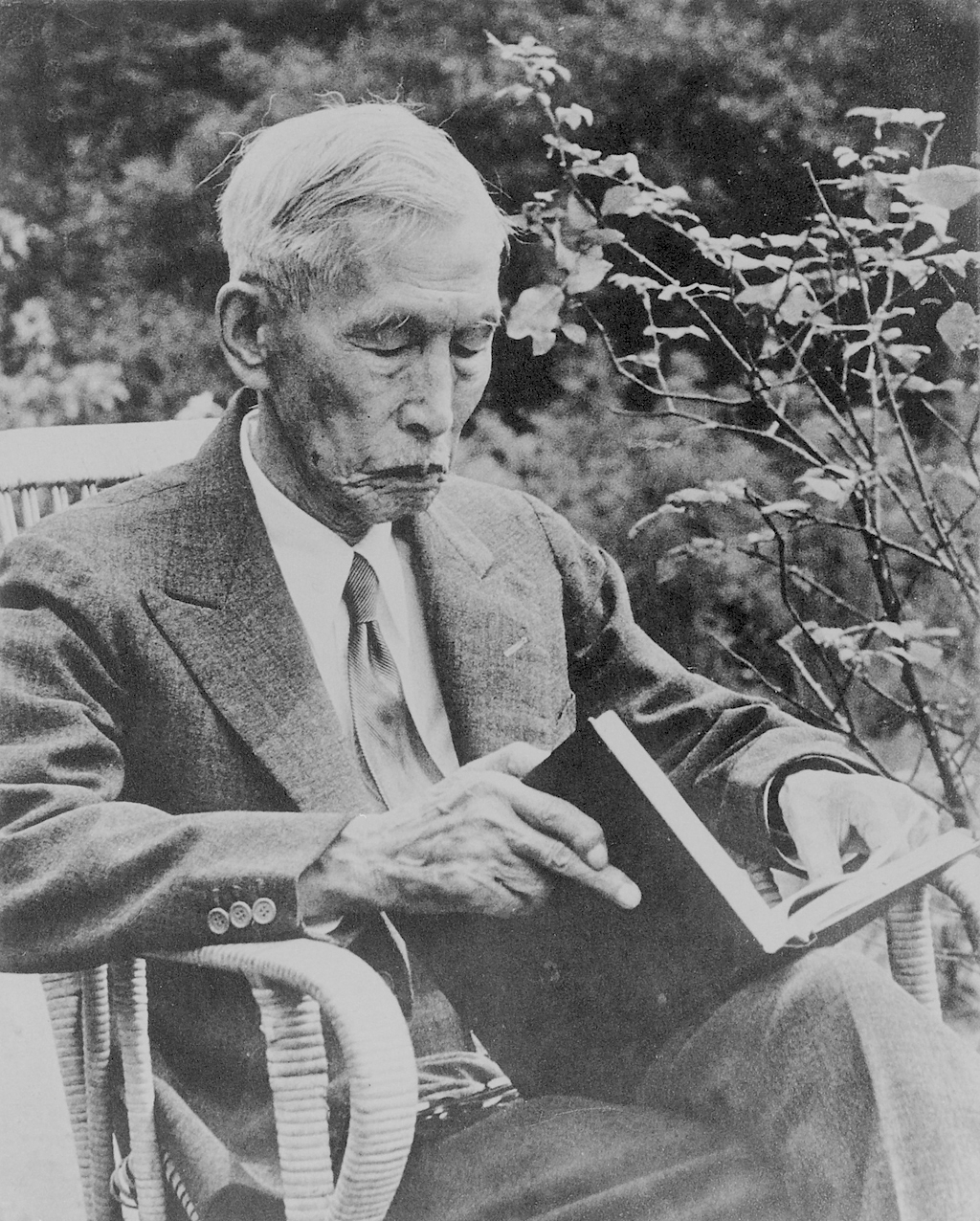
Kabayama in later life

In the 1930s, Kabayama was one of the first directors of the Society for the Promotion of International Culture (Kokusai Bunka Shinkōkai), and an early leader of the America-Japan Society (Nichi-Bei Kyōkai).
