= Toshiko Matsuo =

Japanese politician (1907–1993)

- 松尾 トシ子

Member of the House of Representatives; from Kanagawa
- In office 27 February 1955 – 24 October 1960
- Preceded by: Naka Sukematsu
- Succeeded by: Yoshimori Yoneda
- Constituency: 1st district
- In office 10 April 1946 – 14 March 1953
- Preceded by: Constituency established
- Succeeded by: Ichio Asukata
- Constituency: At-large district (1946–1947); 1st district (1947–1953)

Personal details
- Born: 14 July 1907 Yokohama, Kanagawa, Japan
- Died: 3 June 1993 (aged 85)
- Party: Liberal Democratic
- Other party: JSP (1946–1951; 1955–1960); RSP (1951–1955); DSP (1960)
- Education: Ferris Girls' Junior & Senior High School
- Alma mater: Japan Women's University; Nihon University

Toshiko Matsuo (Japanese: 松尾トシ子; 14 July 1907 – 3 June 1993) was a Japanese politician. She was one of the first group of women elected to the House of Representatives in 1946, serving in parliament until 1960.

== Biography ==
Born in Yokohama in 1907, Matsuo was educated at Ferris Japanese-English Girls' School. She became an English teacher at the Yokohama YMCA and established her own school, which later became the Japan Women's English Academy.

Matsuo contested the 1946 general elections as a Japan Socialist Party candidate in Kanagawa, and was elected to the House of Representatives. She was re-elected in 1947, 1949, 1952, 1955 and 1958 and became a member of the party's central executive committee. In 1948 Finance Minister Izumiyama Sanroku was forced to resign after attempting to kiss Matsuo and Harue Yamashita.

After losing her seat in the 1960 elections, Matsuo unsuccessfully contested a later election as a Democratic Socialist Party candidate. She later joined the Liberal Democratic Party and became an advisor in Kanagawa Prefecture, as well as serving as chair of the Yokohama Citizens' Credit Union and president of the Matsuo Kosan company. She died in 1993.
