= Junpei Yasuda =

Japanese journalist

- Born: March 16, 1974 (age 52); Japan
- Occupation: Freelance journalist
- Known for: Being taken hostage by Hayat Tahrir al-Sham

Junpei Yasuda (安田 純平, Yasuda Junpei; born March 16, 1974) or Jumpei Yasuda is a Japanese freelance journalist who has reported from countries in the Middle East, including Iraq, Syria and Afghanistan. He has twice been kidnapped while reporting and was thought to have been taken hostage by Hayat Tahrir al-Sham in Syria for three years before being released on October 23, 2018.

== History ==
He was a former reporter at The Shinano Mainichi Shimbun.

=== Iraq ===
In April 2004, Yasuda was kidnapped on suspicion of spying by locals in Iraq, but was released after three days without any demand and statement.

=== Syria kidnapping ===
Yasuda went missing while reporting from Syria between June 20–23, 2015. He was believed to have been kidnapped by Hayat Tahrir al-Sham.

On March 17, 2016, Yasuda appeared in a video believed have been recorded the previous day.

On July 6, 2018, Yasuda appeared in a video released by Nippon News Network, who obtained the video from a person connected to Hay'at Tahrir al-Sham. The video appeared to be recorded in October 2017.

On August 1, 2018, Yasuda appeared in another hostage video, in which he stated the date of recording as July 25. He said in the video "My name is Umaru and I'm South Korean." in Japanese.

On October 23, 2018, Yasuda was released in Antakya and in a brief video statement released by Turkish officials stated "My name is Junpei Yasuda, Japanese journalist. I have been held in Syria for 40 months, now in Turkey. Now I'm in safe condition. Thank you very much". Yasuda left Istanbul for Tokyo the day after his release. It's reported on October 25, 2018 that agents from the International Counter-Terrorism Intelligence Collection Unit (ICTICU) played a role in securing his release.

In November 2018, a Canadian citizen who was held hostage in Syria alongside Yasuda claimed they were held by Hayat Tahrir al-Sham. He said they were both held at the same facility in small cells indicating that they suffered beatings and were fed rotten food.

== See also ==
- List of kidnappings
- List of solved missing person cases (post-2000)
