= Harue Yamashita =

Japanese politician (1901–1985)

- 山下 春江
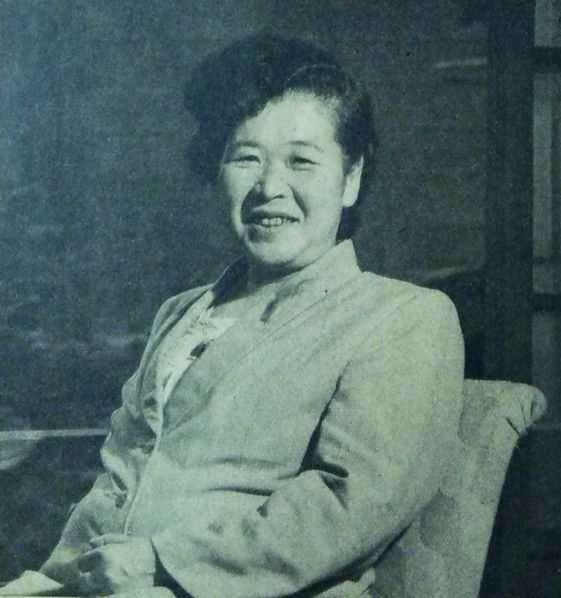
- Yamashita in 1952

Member of the House of Councillors
- In office 8 July 1962 – 7 July 1974
- Constituency: National district

Member of the House of Representatives; from Fukushima
- In office 2 October 1952 – 24 October 1960
- Constituency: 2nd district
- In office 11 April 1946 – 23 December 1948
- Preceded by: Constituency established
- Succeeded by: Multi-member district
- Constituency: At-large district (1946–1947); 2nd district (1947–1948)

Personal details
- Born: 9 August 1901 Hagi, Yamaguchi, Japan
- Died: 19 March 1985 (aged 83)
- Party: Liberal Democratic
- Other political affiliations: JPP (1946–1947); DP (1947–1950); Kaishintō (1952–1954)

Harue Yamashita (Japanese: 山下春江; 9 August 1901 – 19 March 1985) was a Japanese politician. She was one of the first group of women elected to the House of Representatives in 1946.

== Early life ==
Yamashita was born in Hagi in 1901. She graduated from Nikaido Gymnasium in 1921, after which she worked as a teacher at Kure High School for Girls. After resigning due to a dispute with the principal over exams, she became a reporter for Osaka Mainichi Shimbun. She married Etsuzo Yamashita and became manager of his Fuji Asbestos Industry company after he became ill. During World War II she was evacuated to the village of Bohata after the factory was destroyed.

== Political career ==
After the war, Yamashita joined the Japan Progressive Party. She was a candidate for the party in Fukushima in the 1946 general elections (the first in which women could vote), and was elected to the House of Representatives. The following year the JPP merged into the Democratic Party. She was re-elected as a Democratic Party in the 1947 elections. In December 1948 Finance Minister Izumiyama Sanroku was forced to resign after attempting to kiss Yamashita and Toshiko Matsuo. She subsequently lost her seat in the January 1949 elections.

Yamashita then joined the Kaishintō party and was elected back to the House of Representatives in 1952. She was subsequently re-elected in 1953. After joining the Shintō Dōshikai, she was re-elected again in 1955, after which she became a member of the Liberal Democratic Party. She was re-elected in 1958, serving until the 1960 elections. In 1962 she was elected to the House of Councillors. Re-elected in 1968, she served until 1974.

Yamashita was awarded the Order of the Sacred Treasure in 1971. She died in 1985.
