= Ishibashi Ningetsu =

Ishibashi Ningetsu (石橋 忍月, 1 September 1865 – 1 February 1926) was a Japanese writer and literature critic. His critique "Maihime", on the short story of the same name by Mori Ōgai, was an important dispute in literature during the early Meiji period. He was also among the contributors of Jogaku zasshi, an influential magazine of the Meiji era.

== Major works ==
- Zaika Ron (罪過論, 1890)
- Maihime (舞姫, 1890)

== See also ==
- Japanese literature
- List of Japanese authors
