= The Shinano Mainichi Shimbun =

Newspaper in Japan

- Nameplate

- Front page of The Shinano Mainichi Shimbun on May 9, 2023
- Native name: 信濃毎日新聞
- Type: Daily newspaper
- Owner: The Shinano Mainichi Shimbun Company
- President: Sōtarō Kosaka
- Editor-in-chief: Kazuo Takamori
- Founded: July 5, 1873
- Political alignment: Left; Liberalism (Japanese); Progressivism
- Language: Japanese
- City: Nagano
- Country: Japan
- Circulation: 355,000 (as of January 2026)
- Website: shinmai.co.jp

The Shinano Mainichi Shimbun (Japanese: 信濃毎日新聞, Hepburn: Shinano Mainichi Shinbun), sometimes shorten to Shinmai (信毎) or Shinano Mainichi, is a Japanese daily newspaper based in Nagano, Nagano Prefecture, Japan. Founded in 1873 as Nagano Shimpō, it is known for its neutrality.

The Shinano Mainichi Shimbun Company publishes the newspaper. Alongside the daily newspaper, it also publishes the tabloid MG Press in areas around Matsumoto and on its website The Shinano Mainichi Shimbun Digital.

== History ==
The newspaper was founded on July 5, 1873, as Nagano Shimpō (長野新報). It acts as a de facto government gazette of Nagano Prefecture, as the editor-in-chief of the newspaper was an employee of the prefectural government.

It changed name several times such as Nagano Maishū Shimbun (長野毎週新聞), Nagano Shimbun (長野新聞), Nagano Nichinichi Shimbun (長野日日新聞), and Shinano Nippō (信濃日報), before becoming The Shinano Mainichi Shimbun in 1881, in which Shinano refers to the ancient name of Nagano Prefecture. In the 1880s, it briefly became the organ newspaper of Teikokutō but separated in 1886. Zennosuke Kosaka reorganized the company into a kabushiki-gaisha and declared impartiality in 1890.

In 1922, the evening edition was first published. During the rise of fascism in Japan, the newspaper was heavily suppressed after an editorial by Kiryū Yūyū, the newspaper's editor-in-chief, titled "Laughing at the Kanto Air Defense Maneuvers," (関東防空大演習を嗤う) published on August 11, 1933. It criticized the massive anti-air raid drills held by the Imperial Japanese Army Air Service over Tokyo that took place on August 9. The military launched a smear campaign against the newspaper. The company refused to issue an apology and fire Kiryū despite being pressured. Kiryū later left the newspaper.

Following the newspaper consolidation policy of the Empire of Japan, The Shinano Mainichi Shimbun was merged with other newspapers in Nagano Prefecture. In 1991, it integrated an automated typesetting system using artificial intelligence.

The Shinano Mainichi Shimbun merged the weekly tabloids Weekly Matsumoto and Matsumotodaira Town Joho into MG Press (MGプレス) on April 18, 2018. It covers news around Matsumoto and central Nagano Prefecture.

On September 30, 2023, it suspended the publication of the newspaper's evening edition, citing rising costs of raw materials such as newsprint, electricity for printing plants, and transportation costs as the reason. In March 2026, it launched a generative artificial intelligence service that uses its own articles, aimed at being used by companies and local governments in Nagano Prefecture.

== Editorial stance ==
The Shinano Mainichi Shimbun was known for its strict neutrality. It was described as "left-leaning". It is also described by Encyclopedia Britannica Japan and My Pedia as having "progressive spirit". Tomoki Kaneko described the newspaper as "having a strong liberal editorial stance" and "leading liberal local newspaper". The newspaper thinks that "Article 13 of the Constitution is just as important as Article 9", and is against kokkashugi (Japanese Statism) and war.

It used to support Rikken Seiyūkai. During the interwar period, the newspaper was anti-military.

== Contents and features ==
The newspaper publishes an edition daily. It also runs the website The Shinano Mainichi Shimbun Digital. As of January 2026, it has 355,000 copies in circulation.

Since 2020, the newspaper has been running "Walking Through Constitutional Cases: Between Ideals and Reality" (憲法事件を歩く 理念と現実のはざまで), a series where the newspaper interviews individuals involved in various legal cases concerning constitutional issues, such as the renunciation of war, equality under the law, and the right to a decent standard of living.

On October 10, 2023, to commemorate the newspaper's 150th anniversary, it launched "Soba Shimbun", which is a shinshū soba—a local variety of soba in Nagano Prefecture. The noodle was printed with edible ink, featuring images and text highlighting the "charms of Nagano Prefecture". It is also packaged to resemble a newspaper page.

=== Notable journalists ===
- Akira Kazami
- Jumpei Yasuda
- Yamaji Aizan

== Company ==
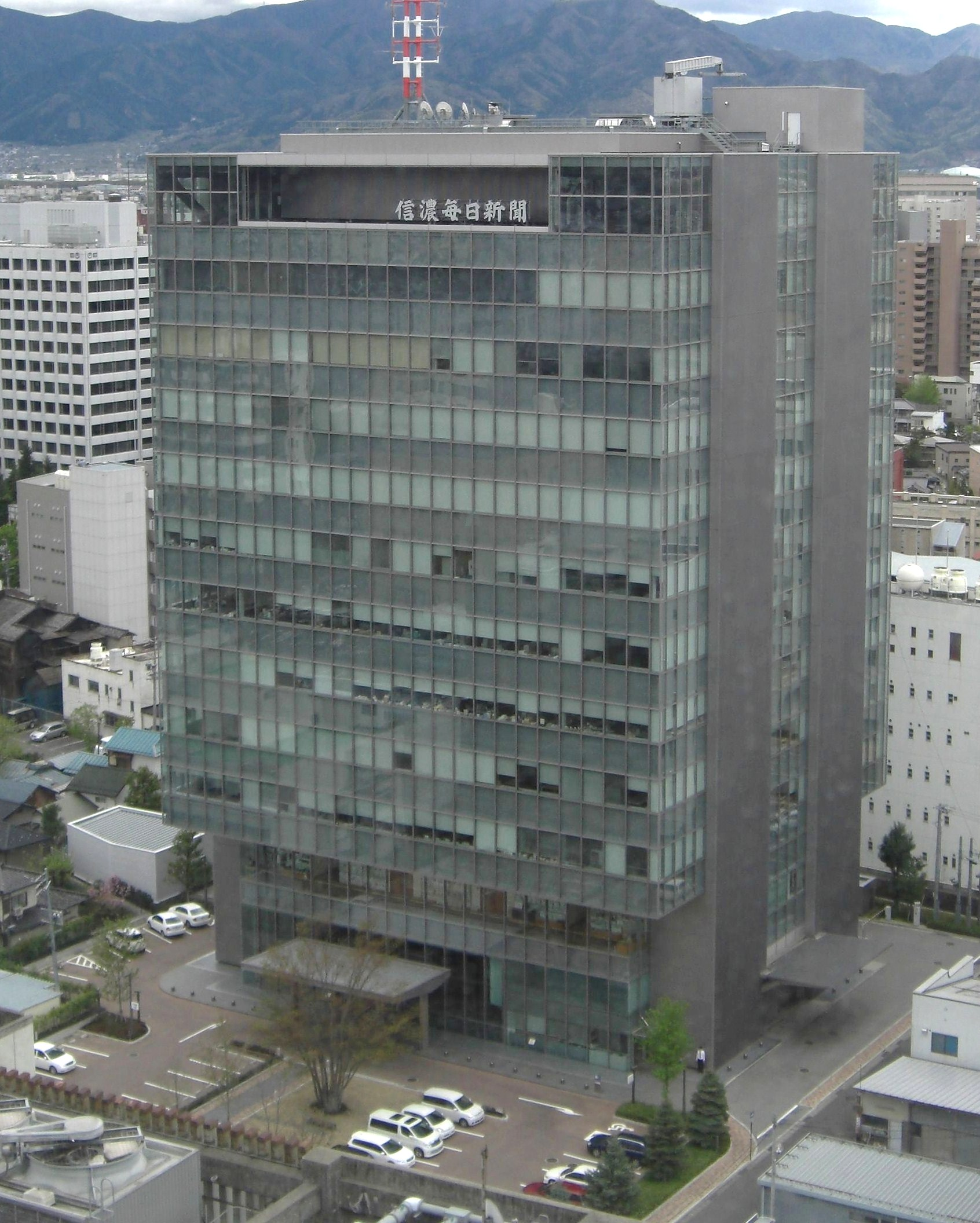
Headquarters of The Shinano Mainichi Shimbun

The Shinano Mainichi Shimbun Company is headquartered in Minamiagata-cho, Nagano, Nagano Prefecture. The company has printing press in Nagano, Shiojiri, and Matsumoto. As of October 2026, the current company president is Sōtarō Kosaka. Kazuo Takamori is the current editor-in-chief.
