= The Dancing Girl (short story) =

Short story by Mori Ōgai

"The Dancing Girl" (舞姫, Maihime) was the first published short story by the Japanese writer Mori Ōgai. The story first appeared in Kokumin no Tomo in 1890, and is based on Mori's own experiences as a medical student in Germany. In some ways, this tale foreshadows Puccini's Madama Butterfly, which deals with a similar theme but with a slight role reversal: in Madama Butterfly, a Western man abandons a Japanese woman, while in The Dancing Girl a Japanese man leaves a Western woman.

The short story was adapted into an episode of Animated Classics of Japanese Literature, which was released in North America by Central Park Media. It was also adapted into an OVA (Original Video Animation) by Toei Animation in 2006.

== Background ==
Ōgai first published "The Dancing Girl" in 1890, based on his experiences as a medical student in Germany from 1884 to 1888. On the incorporation of Ōgai's experiences into the narrative of "The Dancing Girl", literary scholar Christopher Hill notes that while some scholarly interpretations of the story have argued that the narrative is autobiographical, Ōgai based the story off of other students he knew during his time in Germany and that "The Dancing Girl" should therefore not be read as an autobiographical account of Ōgai's own life. As well, Ōgai wrote "The Dancing Girl" during Japan's Meiji era, which saw Japan undergo significant transformation. "The Dancing Girl" has been noted for its reflection of the Meiji era and its societal values and conflicts. On Ōgai's incorporation of Meiji values and conflicts, literary scholar Tomiko Yoda writes: "The text has been often cast as a birth-cry of the modern self, wrought in the conflict of modernity versus tradition, the East versus West, and individual desires versus repressive rules and regulations of society", reflecting changes to Japanese society during the Meiji era.

"The Dancing Girl" has also been noted as an example of the development of modern Japanese literature during the Meiji era, with Ōgai's story cited as an example of neoclassical literature and for its use of first-person narration, a prevalent feature of modern literature in the 19th century.

== Plot ==
The story is the account of the star-crossed romance between a German dancing girl, Elise, and the protagonist, Ōta Toyotarō, a Japanese exchange student who must choose between his career and his feelings for the dancer. Toyotarō comes to Germany after coasting through his college work standing at the top of his class. Upon arriving to Germany, Toyotarō feels isolated from his peers as he did not party like they did. One night on his way home, Toyotarō stumbles upon a crying Elise and immediately is interested in helping her. Eventually he is fired from his post but gets another job through his friend Aizawa Kenkichi. Over time, Toyotarō's feelings towards Elise become more romantic and she becomes pregnant. At the same time, Toyotarō is pulled towards his career by Aizawa and the Count. Toyotarō eventually chooses his career, sending Elise into a nervous breakdown. He leaves Elise alone and pregnant with his child, traveling back to Tokyo, ending the story. Afterwards, Mori Ōgai describes his experience in Germany, as well as a few other people's accounts, as the inspiration.

== Characters ==
=== Ōta Toyotarō ===
Toyotarō's father died when he was a young child, and he was raised by his mother in Tokyo. Toyotarō claims that he had been a good son, having given his mother "the strength to go through life."

Prior to his arrival in Berlin, Toyotarō was an exemplary student and employee in Tokyo. He studied law at the University of Tokyo and reports "having achieved greater honor than had any other student since the founding of the university." He is a polyglot, speaking French and German as well as Japanese.

During his stay in Berlin, Toyotarō is disillusioned with the "passive, mechanical being" he has become. He no longer takes pride in having excelled at academic and professional endeavours. He feels as though his success was a reward for being passive.

Toyotarō admits to being a weak-willed person, and immediately agreeing with his superiors without considering consequences. Throughout the novella, Toyotarō himself plays a secondary role in most events: it is largely the actions of Elise, his mother, and Aizawa Kenkichi that further the narrative. He expresses shame over this quality, but no desire to rectify it.

=== Elise ===
Elise (also written as Elis) was born into a poor family, and received little formal education growing up. She is described as having blue eyes and golden hair. Toyotarō is taken aback by her appearance upon meeting her, and remarks on her beauty throughout the novella.

At fifteen, Elise began training as a dancer for a theatre in response to an advertisement. At the time of meeting Toyotarō, Elise was employed as the theatre's second dancer. Toyotarō recounts the hardship of her life: Elise is worked to the bone with daytime rehearsals and nighttime performances, and her wages are a pittance. Toyotarō states that, despite it being common for dancing girls to become prostitutes due to these conditions, Elise has not done so because of her "modest nature" and her father's protection.

Toyotarō becomes something of a mentor for Elise near the beginning of their relationship. Elise had enjoyed reading since she was a child, and voraciously read any material that Toyotarō gave her. She initially has an accent when speaking, and a poor grasp of grammar and punctuation, but Toyotarō claims that his tutelage removed Elise's accent and improved her writing.

=== Aizawa Kenkichi ===
Aizawa Kenkichi is Toyotarō's friend from Japan. He is employed as the private secretary to Count Amakata of Tokyo. He uses this connection, and others, to help restore Toyotarō's standing.

While in Japan, Kenkichi read about Toyotarō losing his job in a newspaper, and persuaded the editor of a Berlin newspaper to employ Toyotarō. The two reconnected, and Kenkichi facilitates contact between Toyotarō and the Count.

Kenkichi encourages Toyotarō to end his relationship with Elise. He tells Toyotarō that Elise is beneath his station, a limitation to the success of his career, and a stain on his reputation. To increase the Count's faith in Toyotarō, Kenkichi goes behind Toyotarō's back and informs the Count that Toyotarō is planning on abandoning Elise. Kenkichi does, however, provide financial support for Elise and her family while Toyotarō is recovering from his illness.

The final line of the story is Toyotarō's reflection upon their relationship: "Friends like Aizawa Kenkichi are rare indeed, and yet to this very day there remains a part of me that curses him."

=== Count Amakata ===
The count is first introduced after Toyotarō finds out Elise has fallen ill. He wants Toyotarō's skills and represents the career path for Toyotarō. He is a very influential politician to the point when he asks for Toyotarō, he immediately leaves for the interview. One connection that has been made is between Count Amakata and real-life Yamagata Aritomo. When Toyotarō meets the count in the winter of 1888, Yamagata was also traveling abroad.

== The "Maihime" debate ==
"The Dancing Girl" has been noted for sparking literary debate between Ōgai and writer and literary critic Ishibashi Ningetsu. Shortly after the publication of "The Dancing Girl", Ningestu published a critical evaluation of the story, notably critiquing what he saw as inconsistent characterization of the story's central character, Ōta. Ōgai responded to Ningestu's critique, defending his characterization of Ōta, and the two would continue on a correspondence in which they debated Ningetsu's criticisms of "The Dancing Girl".

Literary scholar Miyabi Goto notes the importance of Ōgai and Ningestu's debate for the continued growth of Japanese literature during the 19th century. On the context of the debate in Meiji Japan, Goto writes: "Many Meiji elites thus conceived of criticism as a distinct, fundamentally different practice from literature, assigning the former the vital role of nurturing the latter" and uses the Ōgai–Ningestu debate as an example of the development of Japanese literature through criticism.

== Works cited ==
- Ōgai, Mori, and Bowring, Richard. "Maihime. (The Dancing Girl)." Monumenta Nipponica, vol. 30, no. 2, 1975, pp. 151–76. JSTOR, https://doi.org/10.2307/2383840.
