= Hoshino Tenchi =

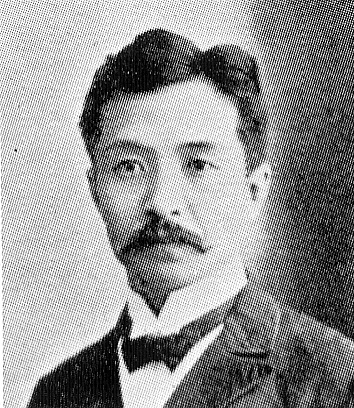
- Hoshino Tenchi
- Born: January 10, 1862; Nihonbashi, Edo, Japan
- Died: September 17, 1950 (aged 88); Ashiya, Hyōgo, Japan
- Occupations: writer, sword master
- Writing career
- Genres: poetry, biography

Hoshino Tenchi (星野 天知; January 10, 1862 - September 17, 1950) was the pen name a noted poet, educator, calligrapher, and martial arts master in Meiji period Japan. His true name was Hoshino Shinnosuke (星野慎之輔). Hoshino Tenchi was one of the founders of the Bungakukai literary magazine, which was highly influential in the development of modern Japanese literature and Japanese poetry.

== Biography ==
Hoshino was born in the Nihonbashi district of Edo to a family of sugar wholesale merchants. He was educated at the terakoya in Japanese calligraphy and the Chinese classics, but unusually for the time, also in the English language. He also attended a preparatory school for Ochanomizu University. However, even as a student he began to submit humorous stories to magazines, and eventually quit both school and the family business to obtain diplomas in jiujitsu and Japanese swordsmanship. In 1886, he entered the Agricultural Department of Tokyo Imperial University, where he majored in medicinal herbs. The following year, he was baptized into a Calvinist church, and became acquainted with Iwamoto Yoshiharu, an advocate of women's education and on graduation, accepted a post as an instructor of martial arts, psychology, western-style education, and kanji, at the Meiji Girls' School (明治女学校) in Tokyo. In 1890, he helped launch a women's magazine Joshigakusei ("Schoolgirl"), for which Christian schools in Japan cooperated by sending a cautionary tale and moral encouragement and poetry written by students, with contributions from known writers such as Kitamura Tokoku and Shimazaki Toson.

In 1892, Hoshino helped launch the Bungakukai literary magazine, which he helped to edit over a ten-year period. Hoshino developed a literary circle with the various writers who lived near his home in Kamakura, where he resided from 1893. He is also known for his biographical works on the Kamakura period historical personages Mongaku, and Abutsu-ni. Hoshino married a fellow instructor at the Meiji Girls' School, Matsui Man, in 1895. A writer herself, she occasionally published stories disparaging her husband's obsession with the martial arts. In 1900, Hoshino also established an experimental farm in Chiba Prefecture.

From 1904, Hoshino was vice principal of the newly established Kamakura Women's School. Around this time, he also became the 8th Grand Master of the Yagyū Shingan ryū school of martial arts. He established the Bugei-ka, a department for the transmission of classical martial arts at the Meiji Women's College, where he also taught the Yagyū Shingan-ryū.

After his house was destroyed in the 1923 Great Kantō earthquake, he moved to Ashiya, Hyōgo, near Kobe, where he continued to teach Japanese calligraphy. He published his memoirs in 1938. In 1948, Hoshino was baptized as a Roman Catholic. He died of natural causes in 1950.
