= Hippo Family Club =

Language-learning network

The Hippo Family Club (ヒッポファミリークラブ) is the brainchild of an organization known as the Institute for Language Experience, Experiment & Exchange, also known as LEX. It was created in 1981 by Yo Sakakibara, who had been researching language acquisition for over 30 years prior to his death. The Hippo Family Club is a transnational network of community-based language clubs in which both children and adults engage in various activities with the purpose of acquiring multiple languages simultaneously. Yo Sakakibara later expanded the organization to the US, Korea, Japan and Mexico. In the United States, the organization is known as LEX America and the language clubs as LEX Language Project.

== Concept ==
The activities carried out at Hippo Family Club meetings are based on language acquisition research projects and studies and supported by language researchers such as Suzanne Flynn, Kuniyoshi Sakai and Noam Chomsky. The underlying concept is that anyone, at any age, can acquire new languages, given a conducive setting for language acquisition. Though languages are superficially different, some linguists argue for an underlying universality among all human languages, and this is demonstrated in the speed with which an already multilingual person acquires a new language. According to Hippo materials and methodology, the way most people usually attempt to learn a language—in a traditional classroom—does not provide a conducive setting for language acquisition. When infants acquire their native language, they don't do it by breaking the language down into little pieces of grammar and vocabulary, or by looking in a dictionary, so this is seen as the most unnatural way to learn a language.

It is believed that children acquiring their language learn by listening to and mimicking the broadest and most basic outline of the language. Any infant with the physical capability can acquire the language spoken around them by the age of two or three. As they advance, they begin to speak in phrases, but may only pronounce the sounds at the beginning and end of a phrase while humming through the rest. Eventually, they become more precise in their sounds and phrases, until they become a mature speaker. Even as adult native speakers they are always making new language discoveries. Adults who are exposed to new languages in a similar way will go through the same natural process.

Children learn by listening, mimicking and making human interactions with other speakers of the language. Therefore, Hippo works by trying to create a natural, relaxed learning environment in which children and adults are exposed to, and interact with the sounds of other languages. One of the advantages of learning this way would be to break with serial monolingualism, a condition in which multilingualism doesn't happen on a thorough and smooth manner throughout the speaker's routine.

== Hippo Methodology and Learning Environment ==
Hippo has its work and activities based on certain group practices and its audio materials. Usually these are referred to as "Audio Tapes", which can be the ones used in metakatsu (the act of repeating sounds and words) or the SADA's (acronym for Sing Along, Dance Along). The clubs follow a very flexible structure, although there is routine and tradition involving certain practices (such as the zai jian "goodbye" song). It consists on regular members who pay a relatively small subscription fee and "fellows", individuals who run each club.

On an extensive thesis written after experiencing both Hippo Japan and LEX America, sociocultural linguist Chad Nilep noted that a feeling of identification with a cosmopolitan identity exists among members, and this occurs possibly through fractal recursivity.

LEX operates a sub-organization for daily activities called Hippo Family Club. Through this club, language facilitators, called "fellows", play a prominent role in assisting members to learn foreign languages. Currently, in order to provide a richer variety of multi-lingual settings, people of other nationalities are being encouraged to become fellows and members.

— Yo Sakakibara, 1984

=== Metakatsu ===
As noted by Chad Nilep (2009), the metakatsu (a combination of the Greek prefix meta-, meaning among, after; and the Japanese katsudou, meaning activity) is one of Hippo's core activities. It consists on the mimicking and babbling of sounds in any given language. Initially, it is very similar to a baby's process of language acquisition—one is not required to pronounce the words with perfection, only to repeat what was heard as best as one can. This differs greatly to the traditional approach of non-native language learning

=== SADA's ===
The SADA's are usually folklore music from around the world, to which some choreography/dance either already exist or is created by club members. The aim of the activity is mainly to establish a playful and friendly setting. Some members note it draws near to psychomotricity, although scientific analysis was not yet established.

== Activities ==
In addition to listening to recordings of speeches, conversations and songs in different languages, Hippo Family Club members get together in community-based clubs at least once a week for interactive activities. Members recite what they can from the recordings, even if the sounds are not accurate, and even if they do not know what they are saying; the first step is to get a feel for the sounds, rhythm and melody of the languages.

Members play games, sing songs, dance, and speak with each other in the various languages they are learning. Through interaction with friends and family of all ages that participate, members absorb both new sounds and important context.

The aim of HIPPO activities is not necessarily to "master" the languages, but to enjoy what Hippo founders call the "process of self-discovery", as members make new friends, strengthen family ties, and create new international connections through language.

Hippo members can attend other Hippo Clubs, including clubs established internationally. They are encouraged to widen their horizons through participation with Hippo club members in other countries. In this way they create opportunities to make friends with speakers of other native languages, and thus come in contact with many languages.

Currently, there are Hippo activities in French, Mandarin, German, Korean, Spanish, Japanese, English, Italian, Russian, Thai, Malaysian, Portuguese, Indonesian, Cantonese, Arabic, Hindi, Swedish, Vietnamese, Swahili, Turkish, and Taiwanese. Hippo Family Club establishments can choose to focus on a few, or all of these languages.

== Homestay programs ==
Hippo members can choose to participate in homestay programs, in which they visit a Hippo Family Club, or other non-profit or community group in another country. Participating countries include the United States, Mexico, France, Germany, Spain, Italy, Netherlands, Luxembourg, Tunisia, Russia, Thailand, Malaysia, Indonesia, China, Taiwan, Japan, Korea, and India.

In Korea, Japan and Mexico, the homestay is completely overseen by Hippo, and in the United States it is co-developed with 4-H Youth. There are currently five types of homestay programs available: the Summer Program (USA, Thailand, Japan or China) the Spring Program (Japan), the Winter Program (Japan or Russian), the World Internship Program and the Yearlong High School Program.

=== World Internship Program (WIP) ===
The World Internship Program allows for people all over the world to be an intern at Hippo in Mexico, Japan or Korea. It reaches out with the support of volunteering organizations such as AIESEC, or Hippo's own institutional propaganda.

=== Yearlong High School Program ===
Through the Yearlong High School program, young students can experience High School in most of the countries Hippo has interchange relations with.

== Transnational College of LEX ==
The Transnational College of LEX (TCL) is a private non-profit education institute focusing on the development of learning using immersion techniques which broadly follow the way in which babies learn multiple languages in a muli-linguistic environment.

The TCL has published many books, most notably a series of three books on Natural Science:

- Who is Fourier? A Mathematical Adventure
- What is Quantum Mechanics? A Physics Adventure,
- and What is DNA? A Biology Adventure.

The nature of the books is such that they allow accessible introductions to traditionally difficult subjects.

Nobel Prize-winning Physicist, Professor Yoichiro Nambu served as senior adviser for the second book in the series What is Quantum Mechanics? A Physics Adventure.
