= Kashiko Kawakita =

- 川喜多かしこ
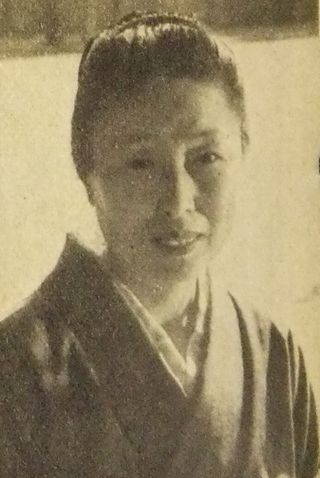
- Born: March 21, 1908; Osaka, Japan
- Died: July 27, 1993 (aged 85)
- Occupations: Film producer; film curator

Kashiko Kawakita (川喜多かしこ, Kawakita Kashiko; March 21, 1908 - July 27, 1993) was a Japanese film producer and film curator, and the wife of Nagamasa Kawakita. As vice president of Tōwa Trading, together with her husband and daughter Kazuko Kawakita she was influential in the development of the post-war Japanese film industry, sponsoring actors and actresses, and in promoting Japanese cinema to overseas audiences.

== Biography ==
Kawakita was born in Osaka, and travelled widely as a child due to her father's business affairs. The family settled in Yokohama when she was 12 and she entered the Ferris Girls' School, to study the English language. She joined the Towa Trading Company in 1929 as a secretary to the president, her future husband, Nagamasa Kawakita. Her first work at Towa was to translate the script of Kenji Mizoguchi’s The Passion of a Woman Teacher from Japanese to English. After their marriage in 1932, the Kawakitas used their honeymoon to make the first of many trips to Europe to acquire movies for the Japanese market. The 1931 film Mädchen in Uniform by Leontine Sagan caught her attention, and she convinced her reluctant husband to acquire the rights for the Japanese market. It became an enormous hit, after its success at the box office, the Kawakitas always travelled to Europe together to select films. They selected the works of numerous European filmmakers, including Jean Renoir, René Clair, Jacques Feyder and Julien Duvivier. They also brought Japanese films to European venues, including Rashomon by Akira Kurosawa, which they took to the Venice Film Festival in 1951.

In 1948 the Kawakitas met Donald Richie and they formed a lifelong friendship. Kashiko Kawakita introduced him to Yasujirō Ozu and was his sponsor when he applied for permanent residency in Japan.

In 1955, she moved to London for two years while her daughter, Kazuko Kawakita, studied there, and was popularly known as “Madame Kawakita”. She frequently visited the Cinémathèque Française in Paris and the British Film Institute in London, and developed an understanding of the importance of "film libraries" for preserving and screening films that would otherwise be in danger of being lost to posterity. When Henri Langlois, founder and head of the Cinemathèque Française, proposed an exchange of retrospectives of French and Japanese cinema; presenting Japanese classic films in France, and vice versa, she came to realize that the National Museum of Modern Art, Tokyo had almost no films in its collection. Determined to establish a public film library in Japan, she helped establish the Japan Film Library Council to preserve films as "cultural properties". This enabled the screening of 131 Japanese classical films at the Cinémathèque Française in 1963.

From Berlin in 1956, Kawakita served as a juror at various international film festivals. She served as a juror 26 times, including the Cannes, Chicago, and Montreal film festivals.

In 1960, Kawakita was a leading figure in forming the Japan Art Theatre Guild, to promote international art film to Japan that otherwise would otherwise never be commercially released in Japan. The Guild later began to produce Japanese artistie/experimental films, sponsoring directors, such as Nagisa Oshima, Masahiro Shinoda, Yoshishige Yoshida, Susumu Hani and Shuji Terayama.

In the 1970s, she was active in organizing overseas retrospectives of great Japanese film makers, including with works of Kenji Mizoguchi, Akira Kurosawa and others. After her husband’s death in 1982, the Japan Film Library Council was transformed into the Kawakita Memorial Film Institute. Kawakita died in 1993.

== Legacy ==
"Kashiko Kawakita Award" a new award is established by the Kawakita Memorial Film Institute to honour women advancing film culture in Japan and internationally. The award will be presented at the Tokyo International Film Festival starting with the 2026 edition of the festival. Hata Sahoko, film critic is the first recipient of the award.
