= Iwamoto Mari =

Japanese violinist (1926–1979)

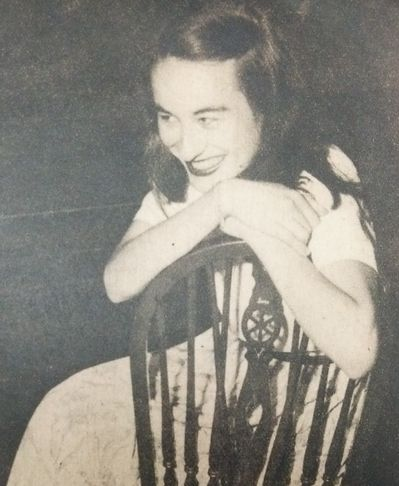
- Iwamoto Mari in 1948
- Born: January 19, 1926
- Died: May 11, 1979 (aged 53); Tokyo
- Resting place: Japan
- Other name: 巖本メリー・エステル → 巖本 真理
- Occupation: violinist
- Relatives: Grandfather: Iwamoto Yoshiharu― Educator for women, Christian. Grandmother:Wakamatsu Shizuko― Educator, translator, and novelist.

Iwamoto Mari (巖本 真理, 19 January 1926―11 May 1979) was a Japanese violinist and educator. She founded the Iwamoto Mari String Quartet and was a professor at the Tokyo Academy of Music.

== Biography ==
Born in Japan to a Japanese father, Masahito Iwamoto, and an American mother, Marguerite (nee Magruder). She took violin lessons from Anna Bubnova-Ono (Anna Dmitrievna Bubnova) after the age of six. She was a child prodigy, winning the All Japan Music Competition's violin category in 1937.

From 1946 to 1949, she was a professor at the Tokyo Academy of Music, resigning the post in 1949 in order to spend a year in the USA. She stayed there in a year and half, and took lessons by George Enescu in Chicago, and Louis Persinger in New York at The Juilliard School. On 14 June 1950, she took a recital at the Town Hall.

She resumed to play a soloist after coming back to Japan. In addition, She founded the Iwamoto Mari String Quartet in 1967, with violinist Tomoda Yoshiaki, viola player Suganuma Junji and cellist Kuranuma Toshio; the quartet won a special prize at the Suntory Music Award in 1979, shortly prior to Mari's death from cancer on 11 May 1979.

== Notes ==
The clip from the Ozu film "Late Spring" can be see here. http://www.otto5.com/_video/Iwamoto_Clip.mp4
