= Dōjinsha =

School founded by Masanao Nakamura

Dōjinsha (同人社) was a school in Koishikawa, Tokyo founded by Masanao Nakamura. It was established in 1873 and closed in 1891.

== History ==
Dōjinsha was founded in 1873. Alongside Keio Gijuku and Sansagakusha, it was one of the three major Western-style schools in Japan that taught English during the Meiji period. The school also offered classes in Western Studies and Chinese. There was also a Dōjinsha girls' school, which was established in 1875, and a school for the disabled.

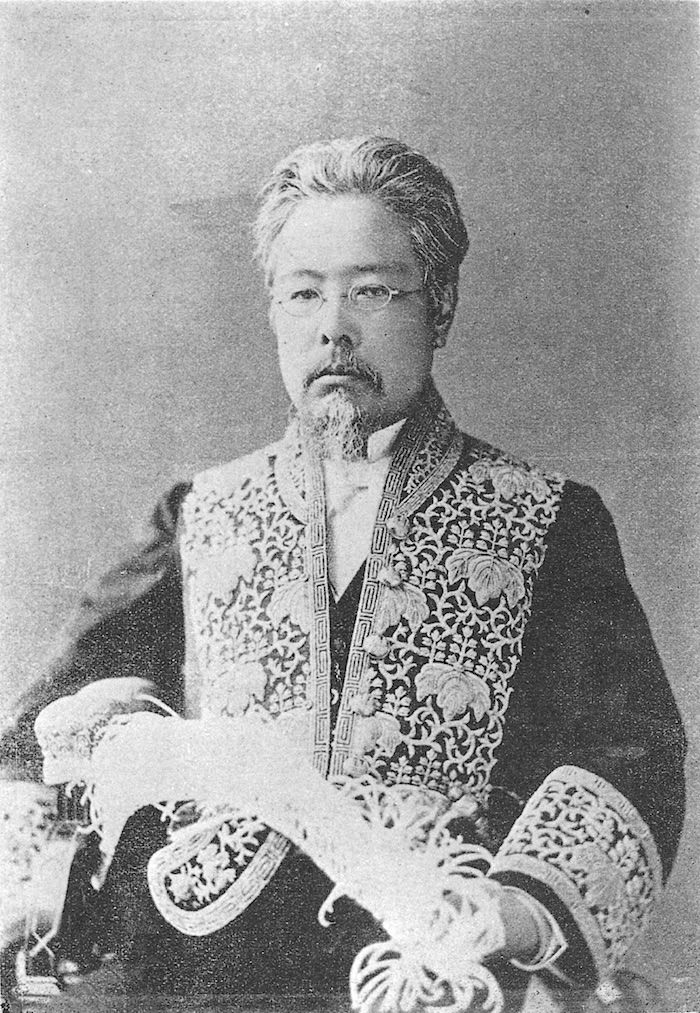
Masanao Nakamura

Masanao Nakamura started the school to get closer to Yukichi Fukuzawa, the founder of Keio Gijuku, and to educate his friends' children. Jūgō Sugiura, a former journalist, managed the school. Nakamura invited Tsurutaro Senga to be the head teacher. George Cochran, a Canadian missionary, taught Bible classes at the school that were well—attended. During his time teaching at Dōjinsha, Cochran converted Nakamura to Christianity, and baptized him in December 1874. Shortly thereafter, a group called the Koishikawa Christian Band (named for the district the school is in) formed at Dōjinsha.

At its peak, Dōjinsha had more than 300 students. The number of students gradually decreased and the school's administration ran into financial difficulties. The school closed in 1891.

== Notable alumni ==
- Hasegawa Nyozekan — Journalist
- Iguchi Shōgo — General
- Ikebe Sanzan — Journalist
- Iwamoto Yoshiharu — Educator
- Kobayashi Yoshirō — Public prosecutor
- Kojima Kazuo — Journalist, member of the House of Peers
- Masaki Naotarō — Educator
- Mori Mōtengai — Politician
- Jiro Okabe — Member of the Japanese House of Representatives
- Tokonami Takejirō — Politician
- Yatarō Mishima — Banker
