= Tokutomi Sohō =

Japanese writer (1863–1957)

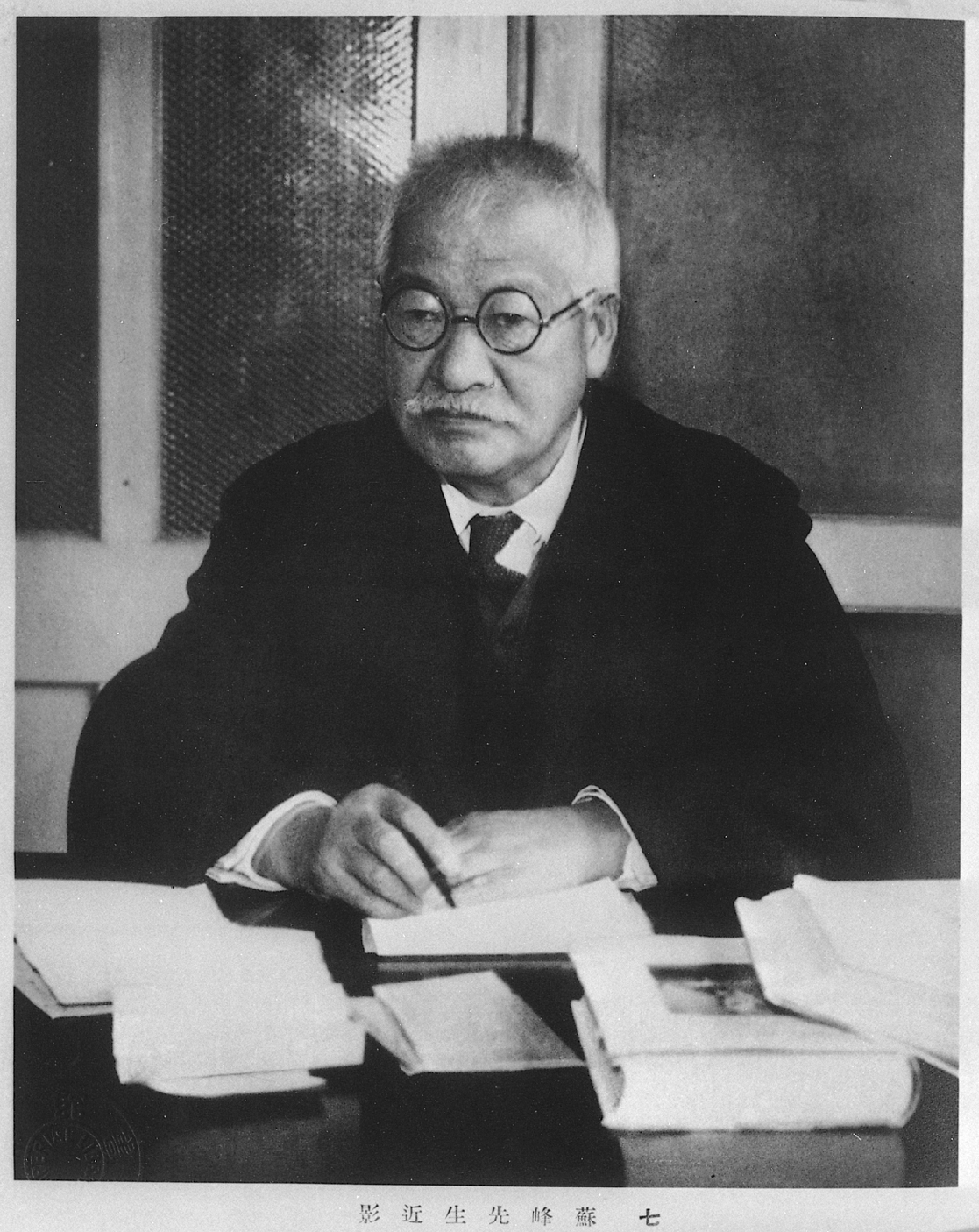
- Born: 14 March 1863; Minamata, Kumamoto, Japan
- Died: 2 November 1957 (aged 94); Atami, Shizuoka, Japan
- Occupations: Journalist, Historian
- Writing career
- Genre: essays

Tokutomi Sohō (徳富 蘇峰; Japanese pronunciation: [to.kɯ̥.toꜜ.mʲi | soꜜ.hoː], March 14 1863 – November 2 1957), born Tokutomi Iichirō (徳富 猪一郎), was a Japanese journalist, publisher and historian. He advocated commoner Europeanism and Europeanization, established Min'yūsha, and launched the magazines Kokumin no Tomo and the newspaper Kokumin Shimbun. He was the older brother of noted author, Tokutomi Roka.

== Biography ==
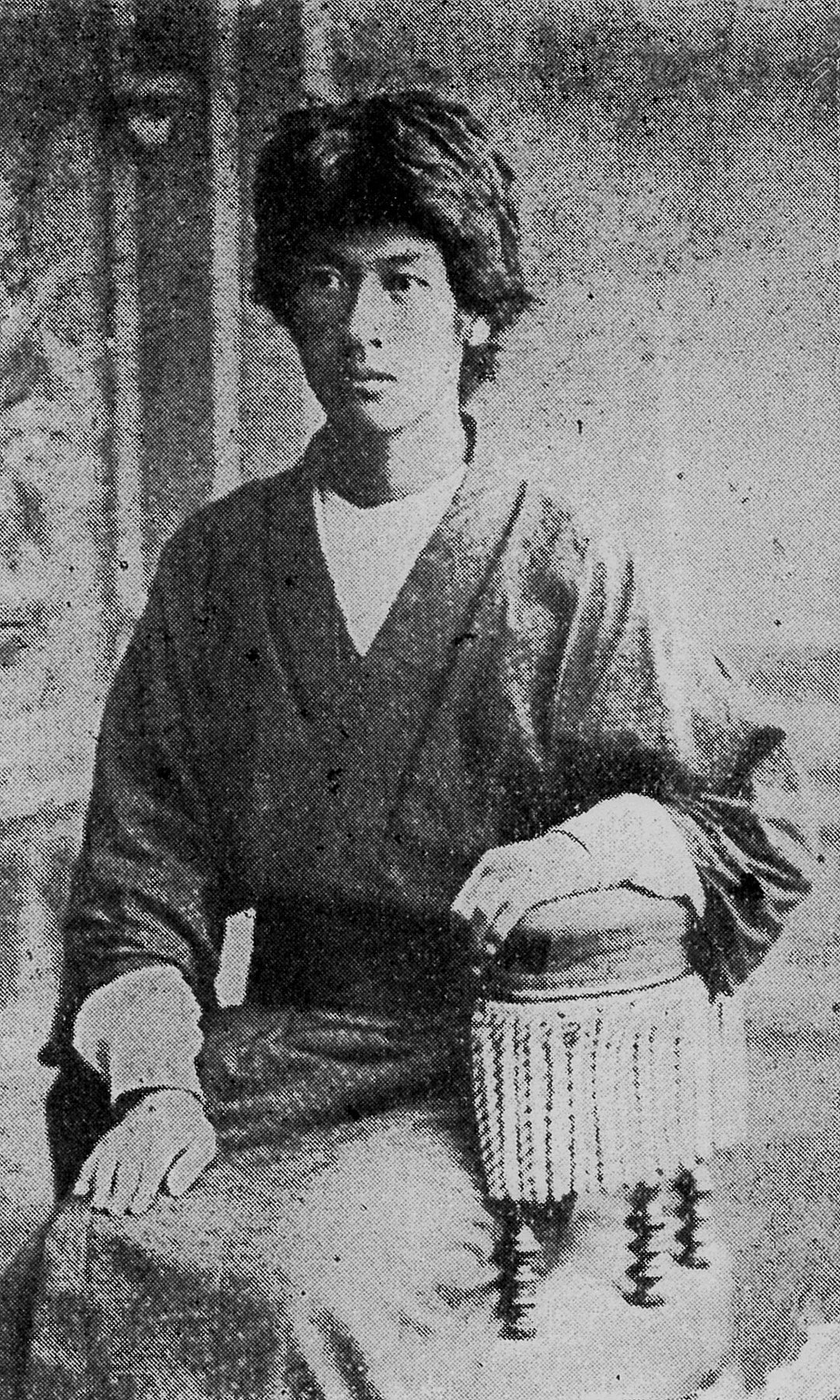
Tokutomi Sohō in 1886

Sohō was born in Minamata, Higo Province (now Kumamoto Prefecture), into a samurai family just before the Meiji Restoration. He studied Eigaku (study of the English language as a means to acquire Western knowledge, especially after the end of Japan's period of isolation) at the Kumamoto Yogakko, and later at the Doshisha (subsequently Doshisha University) in Kyoto. He left school without graduating, but later wrote of his gratitude to the school's principal, Joseph Hardy Neesima.

Following a period back in Kumamoto, where he started a local newspaper, Sohō moved to Tokyo. In 1887, he established the Min'yūsha publishing company, which printed Japan's first general news magazine, the Kokumin no Tomo ("The People's Friend") from 1887 to 1898. This magazine was highly influential in the politics of Meiji period Japan. In addition to this news magazine, the Min'yūsha also published a magazine of family issues, Katei Zasshi ("Home Journal", 1892–1898), an English-language version of the Kokumin no Tomo, ("The Far East", 1896–1898), and an influential newspaper, the Kokumin Shinbun (1890–1929).

Sohō was initially a champion of liberal democracy and populism, as he felt that a free, open and democratic social and political order in emulation of the western nations in general, and the United States in particular would enable Japan to modernize and strengthen itself in the shortest possible time. His newspapers and magazines were a thorn in the side of the government during the first administration of Matsukata Masayoshi, criticizing the numerous corruption scandals of the time. However, following the First Sino-Japanese War and the Triple Intervention, his political views moved to the right of the political spectrum. By the second half of the 1890s, he came to be regarded as a conservative champion of the Meiji oligarchy, and was a close confidant of Prime Ministers Yamagata Aritomo and Katsura Tarō. By 1905, the Kokumin Shinbun was regarded as a government mouthpiece, and as such, its offices were targets of protesters during the Hibiya riots.

In 1910, Sohō became head of the Keijō Nippō, one of the major Japanese newspapers in Korea under Japanese rule.

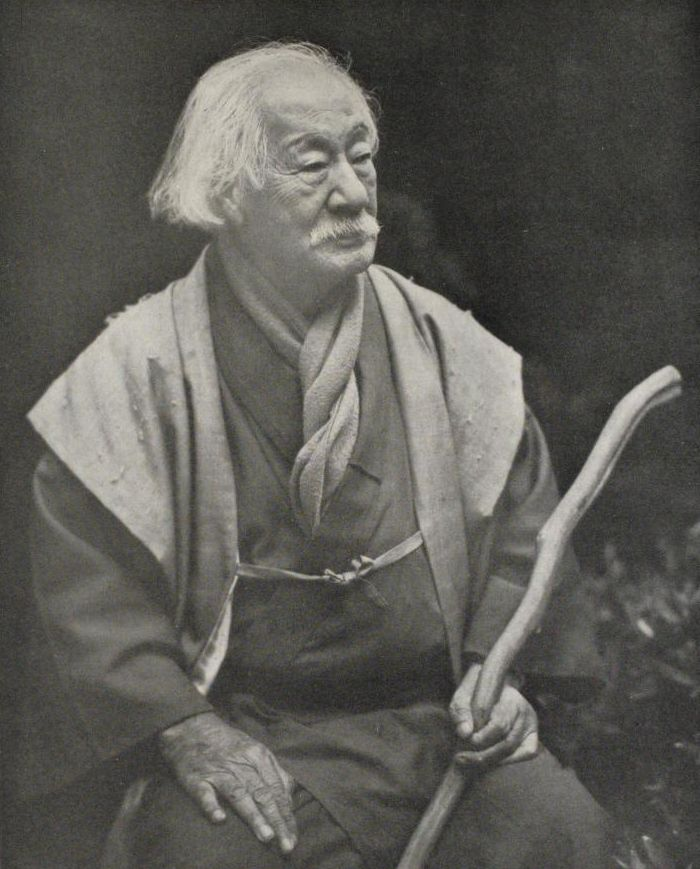
Tokutomi Sohō in 1950

While overseeing these publications as general editor, Sohō contributed some 350 articles, on diverse subjects ranging from international affairs, to history, biography and literature. He also compiled Kinsei Nihon Kokumin shi (近世日本国民史 "A History of Early Modern Japanese People"), which was published in 100 volumes over a period from 1918 to 1952. He was awarded the Order of Culture by the imperial Japanese government in 1943.

Sohō was viewed with suspicion by the American occupation authorities, and was held under arrest during the occupation of Japan from December 1945 to August 1947 as a Class A War Criminal. The charges never came to trial (partly because of his age—he was 82 at the time), and he spent the time under house arrest at his villa in Atami. He continued to live in Atami, writing criticisms of wartime Pan-Asianism in accordance with Japan's new postwar foreign policy goals until his death.

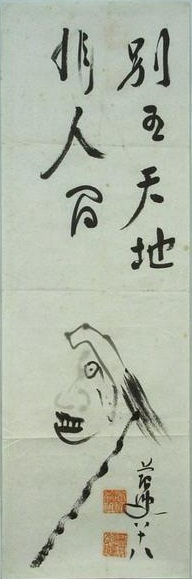
Tokutomi Soho self-portrait at the age 88
