= Kabayama Sukenori =

Japanese general (1837–1922)

Junior First Rank Count Kabayama Sukenori
- 樺山 資紀
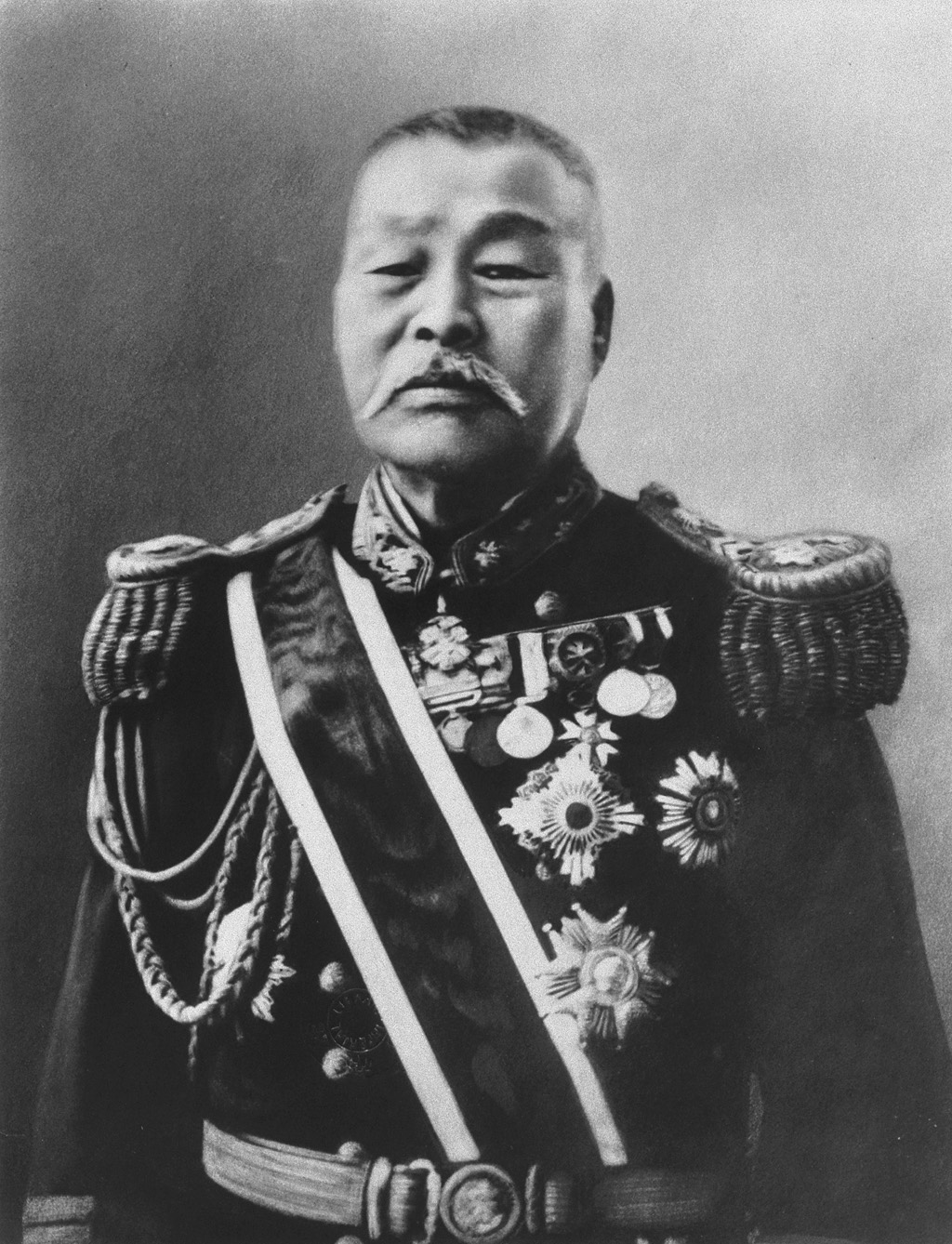

1st Governor-General of Taiwan
- In office 10 May 1895 – 2 June 1896
- Monarch: Meiji
- Preceded by: Office established
- Succeeded by: Katsura Tarō

Minister of Education
- In office 8 November 1898 – October 1900
- Prime Minister: Yamagata Aritomo
- Preceded by: Inukai Tsuyoshi
- Succeeded by: Matsuda Masahisa

Minister of Home Affairs
- In office 20 September 1896 – 12 January 1898
- Prime Minister: Matsukata Masayoshi
- Preceded by: Itagaki Taisuke
- Succeeded by: Yoshikawa Akimasa

Minister of the Navy
- In office 17 May 1890 – 8 August 1892
- Prime Minister: Yamagata Aritomo; Matsukata Masayoshi
- Preceded by: Saigō Jūdō
- Succeeded by: Nire Kagenori

Personal details
- Born: Hashiguchi Kakunoshin (橋口 覚之進); 9 December 1837 Kagoshima, Satsuma, Japan
- Died: 8 February 1922 (aged 84) Ōiso, Kanagawa, Japan
- Children: Kabayama Aisuke
- Awards: Order of the Rising Sun (1st class)

Military service
- Allegiance: Empire of Japan
- Branch/service: Imperial Japanese Army; Imperial Japanese Navy
- Years of service: 1874–1903
- Rank: Major General; Admiral
- Battles/wars: Anglo-Satsuma War; Boshin War; First Sino-Japanese War; Battle of the Yalu; Battle of Weihaiwei

Count Kabayama Sukenori (樺山 資紀; 9 December 1837 – 8 February 1922) was a Japanese samurai military leader and statesman. He was a general in the Imperial Japanese Army and an admiral in the Imperial Japanese Navy. He later became the first Governor-General of Taiwan during the island's period as a Japanese colony. He is also sometimes referred to as Kabayama Motonori.

== Biography ==
Born in Satsuma domain (modern day Kagoshima Prefecture) to a samurai family, Kabayama fought in the Anglo-Satsuma War and the Boshin War.

In 1871, he enlisted in the new Imperial Japanese Army and was accepted with the rank of major due to his previous combat experience. He was one of the defenders of Kumamoto Castle during the Satsuma Rebellion against his former Satsuma countrymen. He was subsequently promoted to colonel, and then major general, and placed in charge of the Tokyo Metropolitan Police.

In 1883, Kabayama changed from the army to the navy, becoming taifu (senior vice minister) of Navy with the rank of rear admiral, and was also ennobled with the title of viscount (koshaku) under the kazoku peerage system. The following year he was promoted to vice admiral.

Kabayama became Vice Navy Minister in 1886. He visited the United States and Europe from 25 September 1887 to 19 October 1888. He then served in several positions before being appointed Navy Minister under the first Yamagata and Matsukata cabinets from 1890 to 1892. Although not a politician, he spoke out harshly against representative democracy and civilian influence on the government in a speech Banyu Enzetsu made during the second Imperial Diet session. He retired in 1892.

During the First Sino-Japanese War, Kabayama was recalled from the reserves and accepted a field command, and was present at the Battle of the Yalu and Battle of Weihaiwei. It states something of his personality to note that he ordered his flagship, the lightly armed passenger liner Saikyo to charge the Chinese fleet at the Battle of the Yalu River.

Kabayama was commander of the Japanese invasion force for Taiwan. On 10 May 1895, he was promoted to full admiral and became the first Japanese Governor-General of Taiwan, being responsible for moving the seat of government to Taipei. He was elevated to hakushaku (Count) on 5 August 1895 and also awarded the Order of the Rising Sun (first class).

Despite his best efforts to stabilise Japan's rule over Taiwan, his 13 months term as Governor-General were not peaceful. From December 1895 to January 1896, uprisings surfaced in many parts of the island, and he was forced to request reinforcements from home. In the ensuing action, 2800 Taiwanese were killed. Kabayama was succeeded by Lieutenant General Katsura Tarō.

After his return to Japan in June 1896, Kabayama subsequently served on the Privy Council, as Home Minister under the 2nd Matsukata Cabinet, and Education Minister under the 2nd Yamagata cabinet.

Kabayama retired again from duty in 1910. His grave is at the Somei Reien Cemetery, in Sugamo, Tokyo.

== References and further reading ==
- Ching, Leo T.S. (2001). Becoming Japanese: Colonial Taiwan and the Politics of Identity Formation. University of California Press. ISBN 0-520-22553-8.
- Keene, Donald (2005). Emperor Of Japan: Meiji And His World, 1852-1912. Columbia University Press. ISBN 0-231-12341-8.
- Paine, S.C.M. (2001). The Sino-Japanese War of 1894-1895: Perception, Power, and Primacy. Cambridge, MA: Cambridge University Press. ISBN 0-521-61745-6.
- Sims, Richard (1998). French Policy Towards the Bakufu and Meiji Japan 1854-1894. RoutledgeCurzon. ISBN 1-873410-61-1.

Political offices
| Post Created | Vice-Minister of the Navy; 1 April 1886 - 17 May 1890 | Succeeded by Saitō Makoto |
| Preceded by Saigō Tsugumichi | Minister of the Navy; 17 May 1890 – 8 August 1892 | Succeeded by Nire Kagenori |
Military offices
| Preceded by Nakamuta Kuranosuke | Navy General Staff; Chairman; 18 July 1894 – 11 May 1895 | Succeeded by Itō Sukeyuki |
Political offices
| Preceded by none | Governor-General of Taiwan; 10 May 1895 –2 June 1896 | Succeeded by Katsura Tarō |
| Preceded by Itagaki Taisuke | Home Minister; 20 September 1896 – 12 January 1898 | Succeeded by Yoshikawa Akimasa |
| Preceded by Inukai Tsuyoshi | Minister of Education; Nov 1898 – Oct 1900 | Succeeded by Matsuda Masahisa |
