= Wakamatsu Shizuko =

Japanese writer and translator

Shizuko Wakamatsu 若松賤子
- 巖本 嘉志子; Iwamoto Kashiko
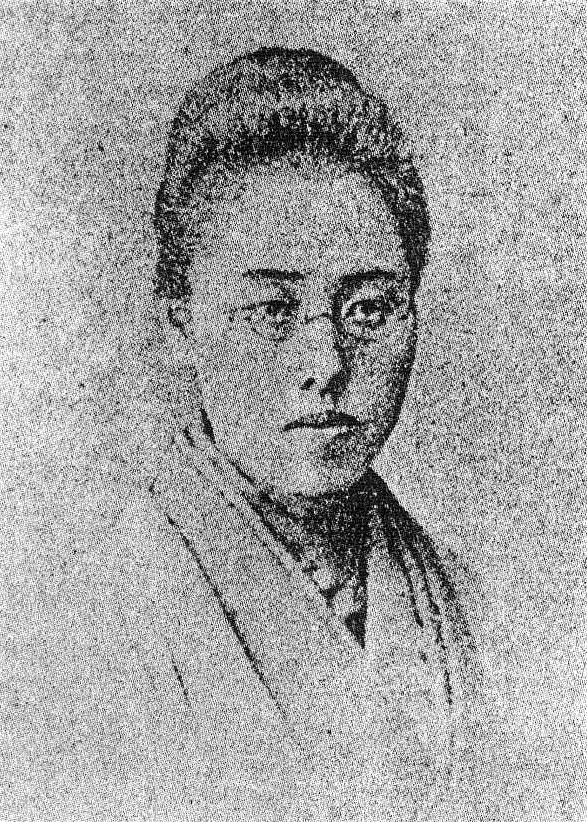
- Born: 松川 甲子 (Matsukawa Kashi); 6 April 1864; Aizu Domain, Japan
- Died: 10 February 1896 (aged 31); Tokyo, Empire of Japan
- Resting place: Somei Cemetery
- Education: Ferris Girls' High School
- Occupations: Educator, translator, novelist
- Spouse: Iwamoto Yoshiharu (m. 1889)
- Relatives: Iwamoto Mari (granddaughter)
- Writing career
- Pen name: Wakamatsu Shizu, Wakamatsu Shizunojo, Bōjo (literary Joan Doe)
- Language: Japanese, English
- Period: 1886–1896
- Genres: Essay, children's literature, translation

Wakamatsu Shizuko (若松 賤子; 6 September 1864 – 10 February 1896) was a Japanese educator, translator, and novelist best known for translating Little Lord Fauntleroy written by Frances Hodgson Burnett. She is also known for introducing literature with Christianity for children's novels.

== Early life ==
Wakamatsu was born Wakamatsu Kashi on 6 September 1864, in Aizu (Aizuwakamatsu after 1868), the eldest daughter of samurai Katsujirō Matsukawa. She was named Kashi (甲子) after the year she was born according to the Chinese calendar. At the age of one in 1868, her father left the family as an espionage agent, serving the Aizu clan against the revolutionists during the Boshin War, and the next year, he was relocated to Tonami (present-day Mutsu) with his feudal lord. Wakamatsu, her mother and the newborn sister Miya endured poverty and adverse circumstances during that period in Aizu. Her mother died in 1870.

== In Yokohama ==
Ōkawa Jinbei, a wealthy merchant from Yokohama was visiting Aizu Wakamatsu and adopted Kashi as his daughter. In 1871 at the age of seven, Ōkawa Kashi was admitted to and studied at Isaac Ferris Seminary led by Mary E. Kidder-Miller, a missionary of Presbyterian Church in the United States of America (PCUSA) who founded the Seminary in 1875. It was in 1877 when Kashi was baptised at the Church of Christ in Japan by pastor Inagaki Makoto.

Kashi graduated from Isaac Ferris Seminary among the first alumnae in 1881 at the age of seventeen and was hired as a teacher for Japanese literature at her alma mater, which was by then called フェリス女学院高等科 (Ferris Girls' High School). She used a tentative family name Shimada instead of Ōkawa, a name thought to be after her natural father's espionage name. Her stepfather died in 1883, and in 1885 her natural father Matsukawa Katsujirō restored Kashi to his family register in Tokyo where he lived. She had been suffering from tuberculosis.

Kashi met Iwamoto Yoshiharu when he lectured at her school, and in 1886 he published two of her articles in his magazine Jogaku zasshi; a travelogue 旧き都のつと (The Product of the Old City) in the 23rd issue, and in the 37th In Memoriam—Condolence Poem (木村鐙子を弔ふ英詩), a mourning poetry written in English dedicated to Yoshiharu's friend the late principal Kimura Tōko of Meiji Girls' School. Kashi had taken her pen name from her home town Wakamatsu, and Shizu or Shizuko meaning "the servant of God". (Note: It was in the 23rd issue of Jogaku Zasshi published on 15 May 1886 when Matsukawa Kashi used her pen name Wakamatsu Shizu for the first time for 旧き都のつと (The Product of the Old City).) Aside from Shizu and Shizuko, she used such names as Bōjo (literary Joan Doe) and Shizunojo at times. For her first name 甲子 (Kashi), she chose alternative combination of Chinese characters to match with her married name as 巖本嘉志子 (巌本) (Iwamoto Kashiko).

She retired from Ferris and married Iwamoto Yoshiharu in 1889 at the church she was baptised in Yokohama. Yoshiharu was the editor in chief at Jogaku zasshi since 1886, as the co-founder and his friend Kondō Kumazō had died that year. Kashi started teaching English at Meiji Girls' School which had been founded in 1885, but Kimura Tōko, the first principal had died in 1886 to whom Kashi dedicated a poetry in English. The second principal pastor Kimura Kumaji was Tōko's husband, and as a good friend of Kimuras', Yoshiharu supported the administrative works at the school. Kumaji retired in 1892 and Yoshiharu succeeded as the third principal until he closed it in 1909. Kashi and Yoshiharu had two daughters and a son.

== Novels and essays ==
There are over 50 literature she published on Jogaku zasshi with the most popular translation of Little Lord Fauntleroy written by an American novelist Frances Hodgson Burnett. The translation, 小公子 (Shōkōshi) was issued as a serial between 1890 and 1892 on Jogaku zasshi. As both Morita Shiken, a translator for Jules Verne's Two Years' Vacation, (Note: Morita Shiken translated Jules Verne's Two Years' Vacation published in Japanese.) and a literature critique/Shakespeare translator Tsubouchi Shōyō praised that she had a style to her writing that unified colloquial and literature language. Her realistic description impressed not only them, but juvenile readers for generations enjoyed her works as much that it is in the 30th impression. (Note: Wakamatsu's translation of Little Lord Fauntleroy by Frances Hodgson Burnett has been published as a Iwanami Bunko paperback (104–105, Aka-331-1, Aka (32)-331-1), reprinted 32nd impression as of 2016.)

Starting in 1894 when she was 30, she edited those columns for women and children in a journal The Japan Evangelist and posted some 70 essays introducing Japanese books, annual events and customs in English.

Her health deteriorated while leading busy life between chores of a housewife and a writer suffered tuberculosis. A fire broke out at Meiji Girls' School in February 1896, and five days after that, Wakamatsu Shizuko died due to heart attack. She rests in Somei cemetery in Tokyo.

== Notable works ==
=== Magazine submissions ===
Jogaku zasshi and Hyōron

For magazines, Wakamatsu Shizuko (Shizu) submitted her writings and translation mainly on either Jogaku zasshi or Hyōron. Both magazines were published by Jogaku Zasshisha in Tokyo.

- "旧き都のつと" [Products of Old City]. 1886.
- "In Memoriam—Condolence Poem Dedicated for Tōko Kimura, the First Principal of Meiji Girls' School" [明治女学校初代校長木村鐙子を弔う詩]. 1886. Written in English.
- "お向ふの離れ" [The Detouched Room Facing to Ours]. 1889.
- "すみれ" [Violets]. 1889.
- "我宿の花" [A flower in my hotel room]. 1892. A serial completed in 1893.
- "人さまざま" [Each person is different]. 1892.
- "大学に入らんとして伯父を訪ふ" [Visiting my Uncle for Advice on Entering College]. Hyōron. 1893. OCLC 835664697. Inspired by Harriet Beecher Stowe.
- "波のまにまに" [In between Waves]. Hyōron. 1893. OCLC 835664697.

Japan Evangelist and Shōnen Sekai

- "Thinking of our Sisters across the Great Sea". The Japan Evangelist. 1894.
- "おもひで" [Memories]. Shōnen Sekai. Hakubunkan. 1896. Wakamatsu Shizuko's last writing.

=== Translation ===
- Proctor, Adelaide Anne (1890). "忘れ形見" [The Sailor Boy]. Jogaku zasshi (in Japanese). Adopted from Adelaide Anne Proctor's poetry.
- Tennyson, Alfred (1890). "イナック・アーデン物語" [Enock Arden]. Jogaku zasshi (in Japanese).
- Burnett, Frances Hodgson (1890). "小公子" [Little Lord Fauntleroy]. Jogaku zasshi (in Japanese).
- Dickens, Charles (1892). 雛嫁 [Hinayome] (in Japanese). Kokumin no Tomo. Translated from part of Charles Dickens' David Copperfield.
- Ingelow, Jean (1893). "ローレンス" [Laurance]. Jogaku zasshi (in Japanese).
- Burnett, Frances Hodgson (1893). "セイラ・クルーの話" [Sara Crewe]. Shōnen-en (in Japanese). A serial run through 1894.
- Wiggin, Kate Douglas (1893). "いわひ歌" [The Birds's Christmas Carol]. Jogaku zasshi (in Japanese). Also titled as いわひ歌 (Carol) [クリスマスの天使 (Christmas Angel)].

=== Reprints ===
Articles and titles reprinted in recent years.

- "お向ふの離れ" [The Detouched Room Facing to Ours]. 樋口一葉・明治女流文學・泉鏡花集 (Higuchi Ichiyo, Meiji literature by woman writers, and Izumi Kyōka). 現代日本文学大系. 5. Chikumashobo. 1976. ISBN 4480100059. OCLC 40086632.
- Manshundō, ed. (1984). 女学雑誌 (復刻版) [Jogaku zasshi, reprint] (in Japanese). Rinsen Shoten. OCLC 894824931.
- 小公子 [Little Lord Fauntleroy]. Iwanami Shoten. 1939. ISBN 978-4003233115. OCLC 835167827. In Iwanami Bunko, 30th impression.
- Burnett, Frances Hodgson (2000). Kawato, Michiaki; Sakibara, Takanori (eds.). "Sara Crewe (Anthology of Burnett)" [セイラ・クルーの話 バーネット集]. 明治翻訳文学全集—新聞雑誌編 21 (Translated literatures of Meiji era—Newspapers and Magazines). 21. Translated by Wakamatsu, Shizuko. Ōzorasha. ISBN 9784756803184. OCLC 840679455.

Anthology

- Iwamoto, Kashiko (1982). Iwamoto Yoshiharu (ed.). 巖本嘉志子—英文遺稿集 [Anthology of Iamoto Yoshiko's writings in English]. Ryūkei shosha. OCLC 672610011.
- Ozaki, Rumi; Japan Society of the History of Children's Culture, eds. (1995). "Children's stories Translated by Shizuko Wakamatsu". History of Japanese Children's Culture. 4. Kyūzansha. ISBN 9784906563647. OCLC 34720410.
- Kawato, Michiaki; Sakibara, Takanori, eds. (2000). "若松賤子集" [Works of Shizuko Wakamatsu]. 明治の女流文学—翻訳編 第1巻 (Translated literature—Works of women novelist in Meiji era). 明治文学復刻叢書 (Reprinted works of novel and literature in Meiji era). 1. Translated by Wakamatsu, Shizuko; Senuma, Kayō; Ōtsuka, Kusuoko. Gogatsu Shobō. ISBN 9784772703253. OCLC 959673525.
