= Kuniyoshi Sakai =

Japanese neurobiologist

Kuniyoshi Sakai (酒井 邦嘉, Sakai Kuniyoshi) is a Japanese neuroscientist and biophysicist. He is an associate professor at the University of Tokyo. Most of the research that Sakai conducts focuses on neurobiology.

== Early life ==
Sakai was born in Tokyo, Japan. He obtained a B.S. in physics in 1987, an M.S. in biophysics in 1989, and a Ph.D. in biophysics in 1992 from the University of Tokyo.

== History ==
Sakai has worked at many institutes. Following completion of his PhD, he began working as a research associate at The University of Tokyo. Three years following this he moved to Boston, Massachusetts for two years. His first year he worked at Harvard as a research fellow in the Department of Radiology. The second year he was a working fellow at Massachusetts Institute of Technology. In 1997 Sakai moved back to Japan and worked in the Department of Cognitive and Behavioral Sciences at the University of Tokyo as associate professor. Currently he is working in the Department of Integrated Science at the same university. He is a member of the Japan Neuroscience Society and the Society for the Neurobiology of Language.

== Neurobiology ==
Much of the early work that Sakai collaborated on deals with the brain in relation to humans and apes. He has stated that the brain is much like a movie in that it gathers a string of stimuli and delivers them to the brain, which then encodes them into a memory.

== Language ==
Some of the focus of Sakai's research is related to language acquisition. In an online article published by ScienceNOW in which rewiring of the brain is emphasized, Sakai comments on human uniqueness of the brain compared to apes. The articles states that through evolutionary time, language has become more specialized due to a rewiring in the brain through the arcuate fasciculus. Human Uniqueness is related to the Design Features of Language proposed by Charles Hockett. Sakai also has composed research on the brain and reading written language relating to words and sentences. Sakai's work has shown the different area of the brain that work when reading individual words and when reading sentences.

== Publications ==
Sakai has written and collaborated on over 33 original articles, 31 books and magazines, and 39 review articles.

== Awards ==
- 2001- 1st Japan Neuroscience Society Young Japanese Investigator Award
- 2002- The 56th Mainichi Publication and Culture award
- 2005- The 19th Nakaakira Memorial award
