= Kokumin no Tomo =

Japanese political magazine (1887–1898)

- Categories: Political magazine
- Publisher: Min'yūsha
- Founder: Tokutomi Soho
- Founded: 1887
- First issue: 15 February 1887
- Final issue: 1898
- Country: Japan
- Based in: Tokyo
- Language: Japanese

Kokumin no Tomo (国民之友; The People's Friend) was a Japanese language political and general interest magazine that existed between 1887 and 1898. It was one of the signature periodicals of the Meiji period. The magazine was headquartered in Tokyo, capital of Japan. It was one of the earliest examples of independent and coherent intellectual magazines in Japan. This was reflected in the magazine’s motto, printed as its subheading - “Seiji shakai keizai oyobi bungaku no hyōron” 政治社会経済及文学之評論 (Political, Social, Economic and Literary Critiques).

== History and profile ==
Kokumin no Tomo was established by Tokutomi Soho in 1887. The first issue appeared on 15 February 1887. It was modelled on the American news magazine, The Nation.

The publisher of Kokumin no Tomo was Min'yūsha, a publishing company also founded by Tokutomi Soho which was based in Tokyo. Although the magazine mostly covered politics, it also published articles on literary and cultural topics. Kokumin no Tomo had several supplements. Several examples of the ancient and modern Eastern and Western poems were first featured in one of these supplements dated August 1889 which are called Omokage, verses emerged in the Meiji period.

Kokumin no Tomo was the first Japanese magazine to feature a review section, providing critical coverage of recent publications. This section was entitled “Criticism” (hihyō 批評), and first appeared in the September 1887 issue.

An English version of Kokumin no Tomo, titled The Far East, was published from 1896-1898

Regulars contributors to Kokumin no Tomo included Yamaji Aizan, and Mori Ōgai, who contributed an article to the magazine almost every month between April 1889 and 1892, including one of his most famous stories - Maihime 舞姫 (The Dancing Girl) .

Kokumin no Tomo ceased publication in 1898.
