= Kuga Katsunan =

Japanese journalist

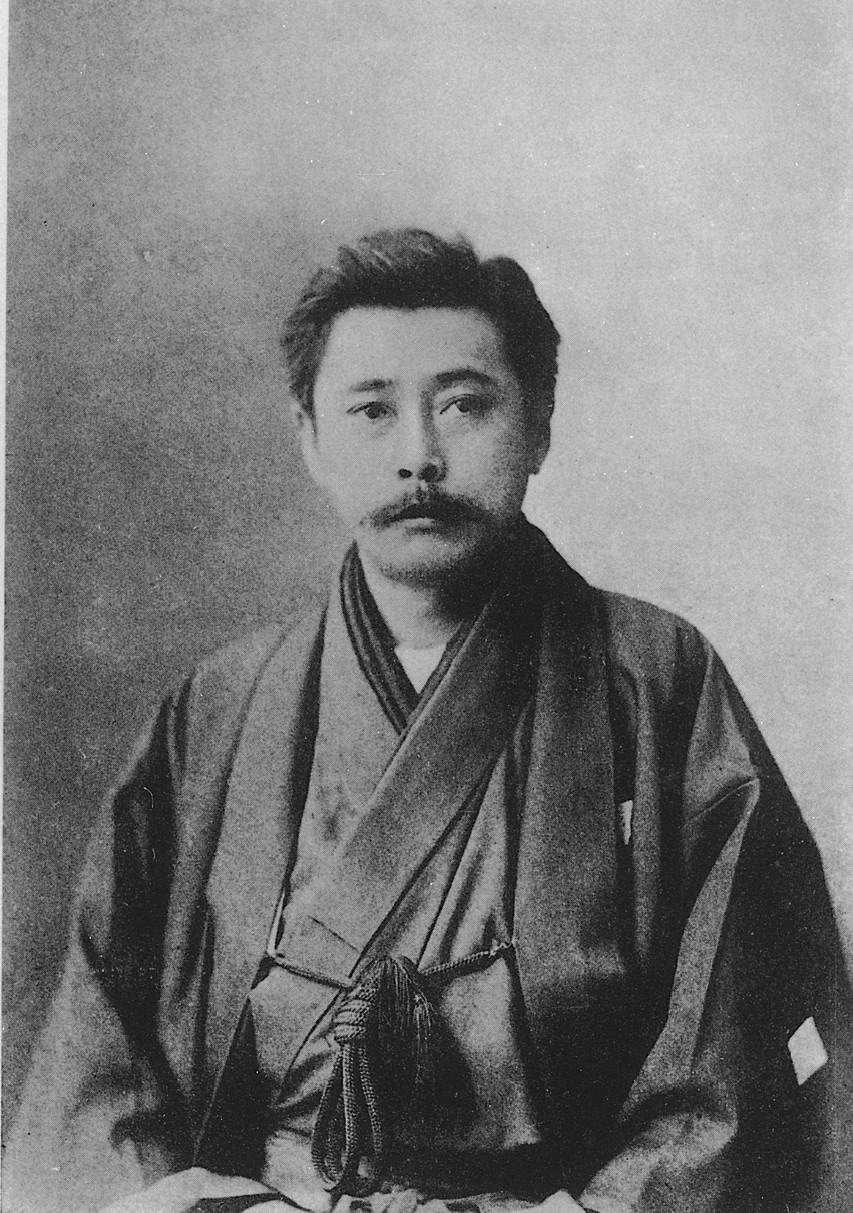
- Kuga Katsunan
- Born: 30 November 1857; Hirosaki, Aomori, Japan
- Died: 2 September 1907 (aged 49); Kamakura, Kanagawa, Japan
- Occupation: journalist
- Writing career
- Genre: newspapers

Kuga Katsunan (陸 羯南; born Nakata Minoru (中田 実) 30 November 1857 – 2 September 1907) was a Japanese journalist. He launched the newspaper Tokyo Dempō and further developed it into the newspaper Nippon, advocating nationalism, and developed speech activities to promote nationalism that criticized Europeanization, in cooperation with the magazine Nihonjin published by Seikyō-sha.

== Biography ==
Kuga was born in Hirosaki, Mutsu Province (present day Aomori Prefecture) to the official doctor of the Nambu daimyō of Hirosaki Domain. He attended Miyagi Normal School in Miyagi prefecture, but was forced to quit due to abusive behavior by its principal, a native of Satsuma Province. This marked the start of Kuga’s lifelong opposition to the hanbatsu system and domination of the Meiji government by natives of the former Satsuma and Chōshū domains. After leaving Miyagi, he enrolled in the Law School of the Ministry of Justice. However, he again failed to graduate, having been expelled together with Hara Takashi for a student protest against the school’s room and board policy.

After a short period in Hokkaidō, Kuga returned to Tokyo to study the French language. In 1883, he started working at the Documentation Bureau of the Grand Council (Dajōkan) and there became acquainted with Inoue Kaoru. After the foundation of the cabinet system in 1885, he became an editing section chief at the Cabinet Gazette Bureau. In 1885, Kuga translated into Japanese some of the works of French conservative political philosopher Joseph de Maistre. During this period, Kuga’s own political philosophy tended towards opposition to the government’s Europeanization program as epitomized by the Rokumeikan, rejecting the current trend toward blind adulation of all things western, and rejection of Japanese history and Japanese moral values. He resigned from his government post in 1888.

In April 1888, Kuga decided to publish a newspaper called Tokyo Denpō (東京電報, Tokyo Telegraph), but due to reader confusion with the similarly named commercial newspaper Shōgyō Denpō (商業電報, Industrial Telegraph), he changed the name in 1889 to simply Nippon (日本, Japan). The newspaper was a platform for Kuga’s blend of idealistic Japanese nationalism and liberalism, which has been labelled Nihon-shugi. Kuga wrote:

If a nation wishes to stand among the great powers and preserve its national independence, it must strive always to foster nationalism ("kokuminshugi")...If the culture of one country is so influenced by another that its completely loses its own unique character, that country will surely lose its independent footing.

Kuga used his newspaper to attack both political conservatives and entrenched bureaucracy in the government. As a result, it was a lightning rod drawing the wrath of government censors, but it also gained a wide readership. Between 1889 and 1896, government censors shut down Kuga's newspaper thirty times for a total of 260 days. Kuga's editorials on political morals influenced Tokyo Imperial University law professor Tatsukichi Minobe in the development of his controversial political theory, wherein he postulated that Emperor of Japan was an "organ" of government, existing for the welfare of the people and not with absolute arbitrary political power.

Kuga continued to serve as the president and main writer of the newspaper until he fell ill in 1906 of tuberculosis.

Kuga relocated from Tokyo to Kamakura, but his health failed to recover, and he died in 1907.
