= Mary Eddy Kidder =

American missionary and educator

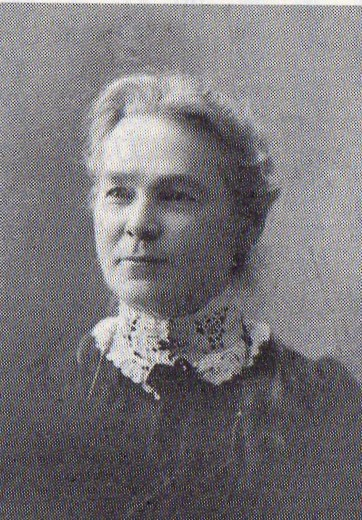
- Kidder in 1875
- Born: January 31, 1834; Wardsboro, Vermont
- Died: June 25, 1910 (aged 76); Tokyo, Japan
- Occupations: Educator, missionary
- Spouse: Edward Rothesay Miller (m. 1873)

Mary Eddy Kidder (January 31, 1834 – June 25, 1910) was an American missionary and educator in Japan. She established Ferris Women's Seminary (later Ferris University), the first Christian women's college in Japan.

== Early life ==
Kidder was born into a devoutly Christian family in Wardsboro, Vermont, United States, and was educated there. She taught at the Wardsboro Academy run by the Dutch Reformed Church of America. In 1869, she became a missionary and travelled with Samuel Robbins Brown to Japan. She was hired by the Japanese government to teach English.

== Career ==
In 1870, Kidder founded a small school in Yokohama. Five years later, with the assistance of churches in the United States, a school and student residence were constructed; the school was named after Isaac Ferris. Besides the English language, history, geography, mathematics and Christian religious instruction, students were also taught sewing, knitting, embroidery, calligraphy, Japanese history and Confucian philosophy. Alumni included Wakamatsu Shizuko. In 1881, she retired as administrator of the school and moved to Tokyo, where she continued to do missionary work.

== Marriage ==
In 1873, Kidder married Edward Rothesay Miller, a Presbyterian missionary who afterwards converted to the Reformed Church. From 1888 to 1902, she worked in Morioka. She also contributed to the monthly Christian publication Yorokobi no Otozure. Kidder and her husband also did missionary work in Kōchi, Nagano and Hokkaido.

== Death ==
Kidder died in Tokyo at the age of 76, in 1910.
