= Iwamoto Yoshiharu =

Early and prominent advocate of women's education in Meiji Japan

- 巌本 善治
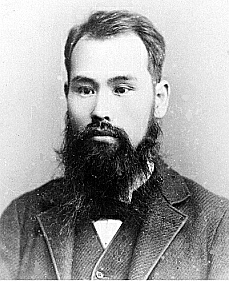
- Born: July 30, 1863; Izushi, Hyōgo, Japan
- Died: October 6, 1942 (aged 79)
- Occupation: Educator
- Spouse: Wakamatsu Shizuko (m. 1889; died 1896)
- Relatives: Iwamoto Mari (granddaughter)

Iwamoto Yoshiharu (巌本 善治; also read as Iwamoto Zenji; July 30, 1863 – October 6, 1942) was a Japanese educator and early advocate of women's education during the Meiji era.

== Biography ==
Iwamoto was born in Izushi, Izushi Domain (in present-day Hyōgo Prefecture), the second son of Inoue Tōbei (井上 藤兵衛). At age six, he was adopted into his maternal line by Iwamoto Hanji (巌本 範治). He began his education with Nakamura Masanao in 1876 at Nakamura's Dōjinsha school, where he studied English; in 1880 he advanced to Tsuda Sen's Friends School to study agriculture. In 1882 he took up a place at Kimura Kumaji's school to study Christian theology. He was baptized in 1883.

In cooperation with Kondō Kenzō, Iwamoto started a magazine Jogaku shinshi (女学新誌) which existed only one year in 1884. Then they began a long publishing career with Jogaku zasshi (女学雑誌) in 1885. There, and afterwards, Iwamoto wrote forcefully to advocate changes to Japanese society with respect to women's roles in society. He called for better education for women, the expansion of their civil rights, and for the refoundation of marriage on the basis of love and respect between husband and wife. Still, he held that women's place was in the home—they would be educated to run efficient, hygienic, and economical homes so as to raise intelligent, moral, and service-minded children.

Beginning in 1885 Iwamoto helped to found and taught at Meiji Girls' School (明治女学校, Meiji Jogakkō) in Kōjimachi, Tokyo with Tsuda Umeko, Kimura Kenzō, Shimada Saburō, and Tada Umachi.

== Publications ==
- 女學雜誌, Issues 251-275 (1891)
