= Sayumi Horie =

Japanese television announcer

- Born: June 23, 1963; Yokohama, Kanagawa Prefecture, Japan
- Occupation: Former NHK announcer

Sayumi Horie (堀江 さゆみ, Horie Sayumi; born June 23, 1963 in Yokohama city, Kanagawa Prefecture, Japan) is a Japanese NHK employee and former television announcer, and a graduate of the University of Tokyo's arts department. In June 1998, she appeared on "Live from Studio Park", NHK's live talk show.

Sayumi Michishige, former member of J-pop idol group Morning Musume, was named after Horie by her father.
