= Post-presidency of Gerald Ford =

Actions of U.S. President Gerald Ford after leaving office

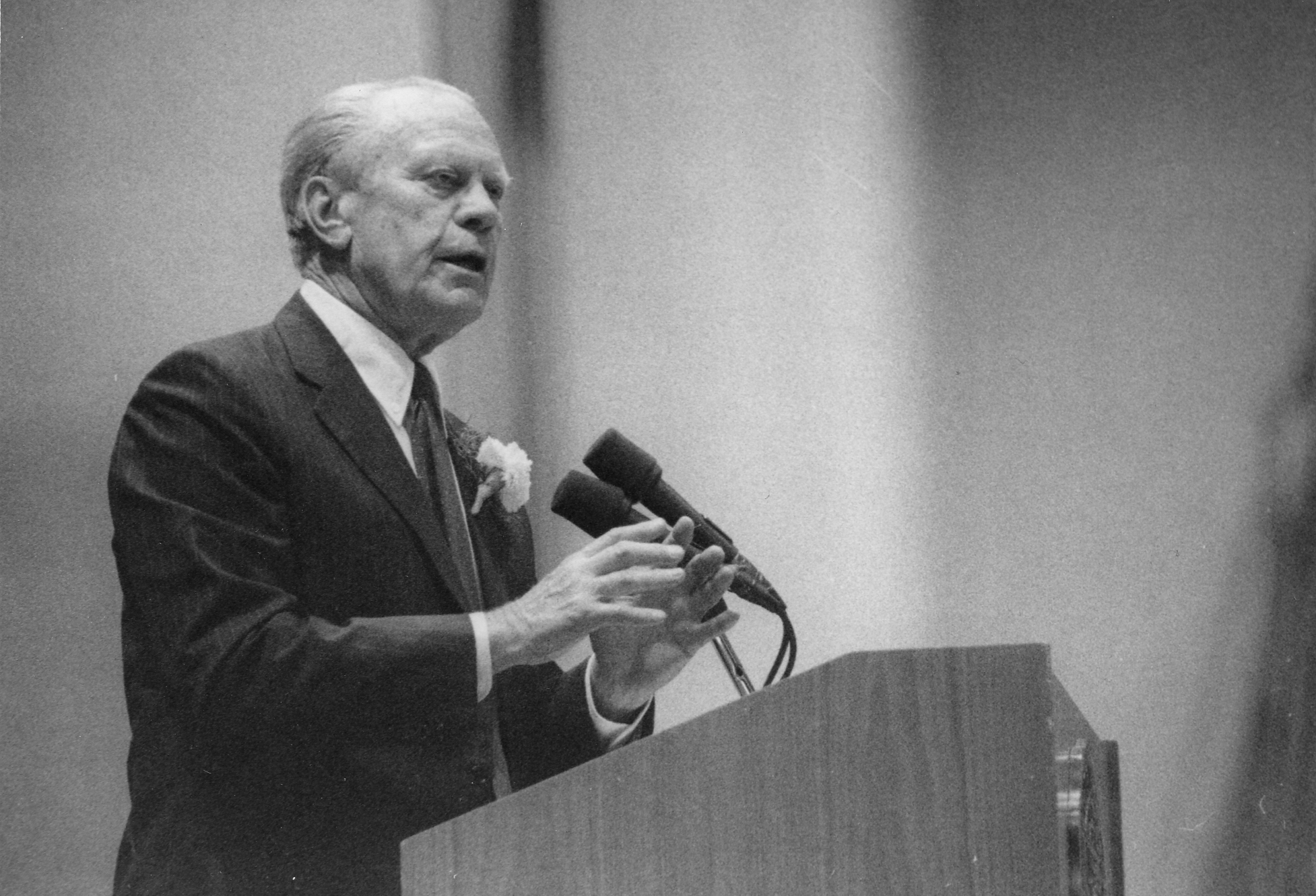
Ford in 2003

Gerald Ford was the 38th President of the United States, serving from 1974 to 1977. After his tenure's end, Ford was active in the public sphere, traveling, writing a memoir, and voicing his opinion about contemporary issues within the United States and abroad.

== Early activities ==
The Nixon pardon controversy eventually subsided. Ford's successor, Jimmy Carter, opened his 1977 inaugural address by praising the outgoing President, saying, "For myself and for our Nation, I want to thank my predecessor for all he has done to heal our land." After leaving the White House, the Fords moved to Denver, Colorado. Ford successfully invested in oil with Marvin Davis, which later provided an income for Ford's children. He continued to make appearances at events of historical and ceremonial significance to the nation, such as presidential inaugurals and memorial services.

In January 1977, he became the president of Eisenhower Fellowships in Philadelphia, then served as the chairman of its board of trustees from 1980 to 1986. Later in 1977, he reluctantly agreed to be interviewed by James M. Naughton, a New York Times journalist who was given the assignment to write the former President's advance obituary, an article that would be updated prior to its eventual publication.

In 1979, Ford published his autobiography, A Time to Heal (Harper/Reader's Digest, 454 pages). A review in Foreign Affairs described it as, "Serene, unruffled, unpretentious, like the author. This is the shortest and most honest of recent presidential memoirs, but there are no surprises, no deep probings of motives or events. No more here than meets the eye."

Like Presidents Carter, George H. W. Bush, and Clinton, Ford was an honorary co-chair of the Council for Excellence in Government, a group dedicated to excellence in government performance, which provides leadership training to top federal employees. He also devoted much time to his love of golf, often playing both privately and in public events with comedian Bob Hope, a longtime friend. In 1977, he shot a hole in one during a Pro-am held in conjunction with the Danny Thomas Memphis Classic at Colonial Country Club in Memphis, Tennessee. He hosted the Jerry Ford Invitational in Vail, Colorado from 1977 to 1996.

In 1977, Ford established the Gerald R. Ford Institute of Public Policy at Albion College in Albion, Michigan, to give undergraduates training in public policy. In April 1981, he opened the Gerald R. Ford Library in Ann Arbor, Michigan, on the north campus of his alma mater, the University of Michigan, followed in September by the Gerald R. Ford Museum in Grand Rapids.

In October 1977, Ford traveled to New Jersey to campaign for gubernatorial candidate Raymond Bateman to replace Brendan Byrne as Governor of New Jersey. Ford used his appearances to criticize the policies of both Bryne and President Carter.

In August 1980, Ford traveled to Tokyo to participate in a seminar for the twentieth anniversary of the Treaty of Mutual Cooperation and Security between the United States and Japan and meet with Prime Minister of Japan Zenko Suzuki for international discussions.

== Presidential politics ==
=== 1980 ===
Ford considered a run for the Republican nomination in 1980, foregoing numerous opportunities to serve on corporate boards to keep his options open for a rematch with Carter. The 22nd Amendment allowed Ford to run for another term but he would've been ineligible to run again in 1984 if he had won in 1980. Ford attacked Carter's conduct of the SALT II negotiations and foreign policy in the Middle East and Africa. Many have argued that Ford also wanted to exorcise his image as an "Accidental President" and to win a term in his own right.

Ford believed the more conservative Ronald Reagan would be unable to defeat Carter and would hand the incumbent a second term. Ford was encouraged by his former Secretary of State, Henry Kissinger as well as Jim Rhodes of Ohio and Bill Clements of Texas to make the race. On March 15, 1980, Ford announced that he would forgo a run for the Republican nomination, vowing to support the eventual nominee.

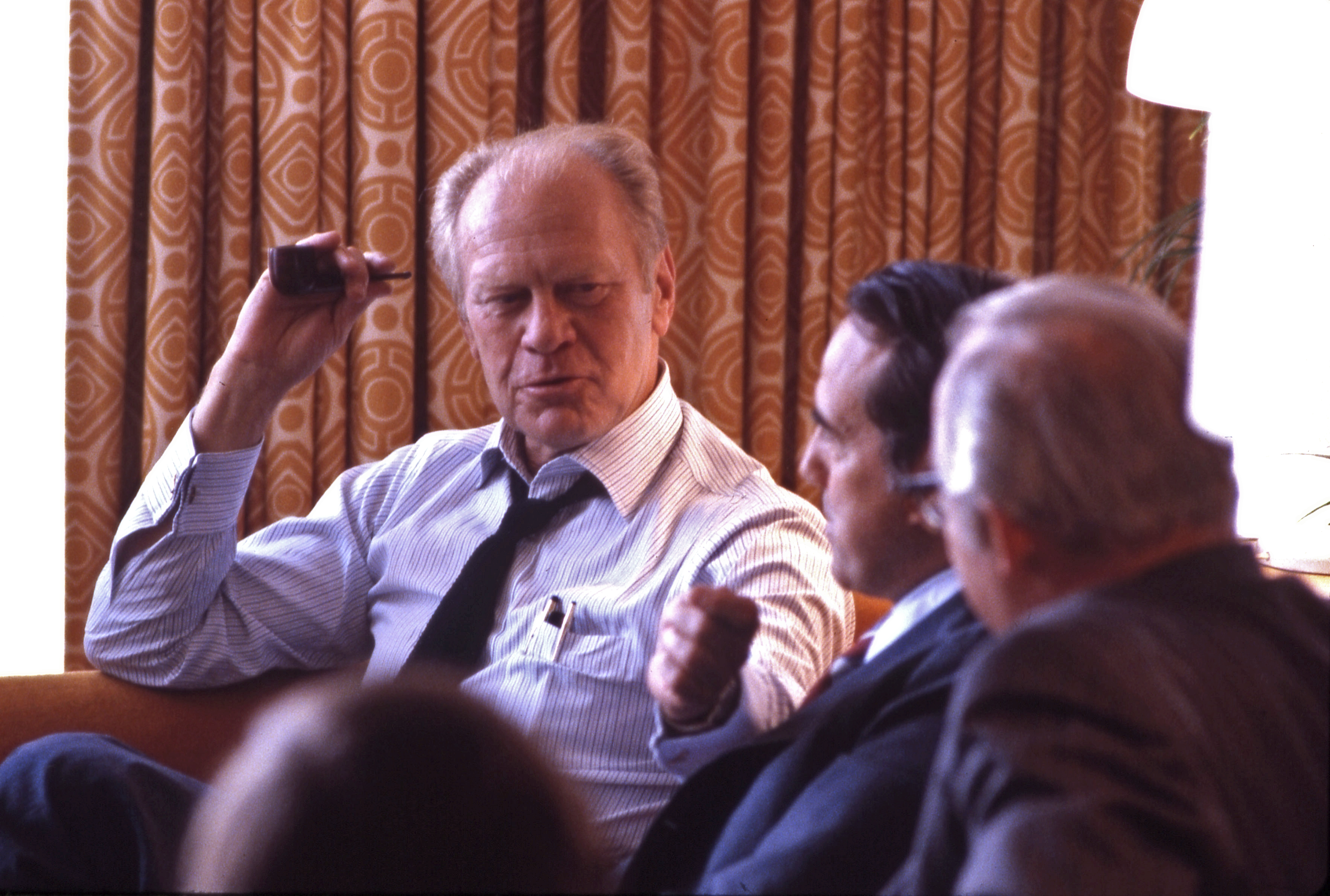
On July 16, 1980 (day 3 of the 1980 Republican National Convention) Gerald Ford consults with Bob Dole, Howard Baker and Bill Brock before making a decision to ultimately decline the offer to serve as Ronald Reagan's running mate

After securing the Republican nomination in 1980, Ronald Reagan considered his former rival Ford as a potential vice-presidential running mate, but negotiations between the Reagan and Ford camps at the Republican National Convention were unsuccessful. Ford conditioned his acceptance on Reagan's agreement to an unprecedented "co-presidency", giving Ford the power to control key executive branch appointments (such as Kissinger as Secretary of State and Alan Greenspan as Treasury Secretary). No presidential nominee before or since ever had ever been so presumptuous to bargain away the prerogatives of the office prior to election. After rejecting these terms, Reagan offered the vice-presidential nomination instead to George H. W. Bush.

Ford appeared in a campaign commercial for the Reagan-Bush ticket, in which he declared that the country would be "better served by a Reagan presidency rather than a continuation of the weak and politically expedient policies of Jimmy Carter". On October 8, 1980, Ford said President Nixon's involvement in the general election potentially could negatively impact the Reagan campaign: "I think it would have been much more helpful if Mr. Nixon had stayed in the background during this campaign. It would have been much more beneficial to Ronald Reagan." Reflecting on Carter's re-election campaign that year, Ford stated, "I sure didn't want Jimmy Carter to be president again in 1980 because I was very sour on his performance as president."

=== 1988 ===
Ford delivered an address at the 1988 Republican National Convention in defense of Vice President Bush against Democratic Party assertions that Bush had been absent in times of significance.

In a September speech in Burlington, Vermont, Ford criticized Democratic nominee Michael Dukakis as having ideas without plans for their financing and stated the US would go bankrupt over the proposed healthcare plan of the Dukakis campaign.

In October, Ford partnered with Carter to appear in advertisements created by J. Walter Thompson encouraging voter turnout.

=== 1992 ===
At the 1992 Republican National Convention, Ford compared the election cycle to his 1976 loss to Carter and urged attention be paid to electing a Republican Congress: "If it's change you want on Nov. 3, my friends, the place to start is not at the White House but in the United States' Capitol. Congress, as every school child knows, has the power of the purse. For nearly 40 years, Democratic majorities have held to the time-tested New Deal formula, tax and tax, spend and spend, elect and elect."

In an October 1992 speech to community bankers in Rancho Mirage, Ford stressed the need for the 103rd United States Congress to relieve regulatory burdens on banks and said increased regulations had heightened the cost for institutions.

=== 1996 ===
Ford spoke at the 1996 Republican National Convention, when the party nominated Bob Dole (his 1976 running mate) for president against incumbent Democrat Bill Clinton. In his speech, Ford quipped, "when I suddenly found myself President, I said I was a Ford, not a Lincoln. Today, what we have in the White House is neither a Ford or a Lincoln. What we have is a convertible Dodge. Isn't it time for a trade-in?"

== Middle East ==
In January and February 1979, the Fords traveled to the Middle East for two weeks, the couple's first time ever traveling to the region. Ford's office announced the trip on January 14.

Following the 1981 assassination of Anwar Sadat, Ford stated the sale of AWACS planes to Saudi Arabia had become more important to the stabilizing of the Middle East and said the Reagan administration would be required to strengthen relations with other Arab countries. He also predicted that the passage of President Reagan's proposal on the Saudi arms package would have a heightened chance of being approved by Congress due to Sadat's death. In October 1981, during a joint interview with Carter, Ford stated that he believed peace could only be achieved in the Middle East with American recognition of the Palestine Liberation Organization, breaking with the views espoused by President Reagan.

After the 1983 resignation of Menachem Begin as Israeli Prime Minister, Ford told reporters ahead of attending a meeting of the presidential bipartisan commission on Central America that he hoped new leadership would bring about more flexible policies within the Middle East.

In April 1984, during a press conference at Fairfield University, Ford charged the personal objectives of Lebanese leaders with hampering with efforts toward achieving peace within the Middle East and stated the Reagan administration was correct in choosing to remove troops from Lebanon.

On January 30, 1991, in an address to students of the University of California, Irvine, Ford stated Iraqi President Saddam Hussein should be purged of his position following allied forces prevailing against Iraqi troops as he believed it was "in the best interests of the Iraqi people". Saddam would remain in his position until the 2003 invasion of Iraq.

== Views on successors ==
=== Jimmy Carter ===
On March 23, 1977, during a speech at the Union Club, Ford stated that the Soviet Union was engaging in a buildup that would worsen the chance for an arms accord. Ford's prepared text stated that Paul C. Warnke narrowly being confirmed as President Carter's chief negotiator on arms had been a warning to the Soviet Union on its continued buildup. The following day, Ford returned to Washington and met with President Carter. On June 30, after President Carter announced his decision to cancel the B1 bomber, Ford told newsmen that he disagreed and that Carter was gambling "on a cruise missile system that is still in the research and development stage."

On August 16, Ford stated his support for the Carter administration's Panama Canal agreement, saying that he was convinced the treaty's approval would be "in the national interest of the United States" and urged quick approval by the Senate. On October 19, Ford delivered an address to a group of business economists at the Pierre Hotel, calling on the Carter administration to pursue a $20 billion to $25 billion annual tax cut immediately.

On February 19, 1978, Ford advocated that Carter invoke the Labor Management Relations Act of 1947 to assist with quelling the coal crisis, which he stated would benefit Republicans in the upcoming midterm elections should it persist. On April 6, while attending a Republican Party fundraiser dinner in Los Angeles, Ford stated the national defense program had not been fully funded under the administration of his immediate successor and the consequence had been the encouragement of the expansion of communism through both actual and believed weaknesses within the military. On December 13, during a speech at a luncheon meeting of the American Enterprise Institute for Public Policy Research, Ford stated that Congress "is just not prepared for crisis management" of American foreign policy and sympathized with Carter over troubles pertaining to the economy and other branches of the government.

On October 3, 1980, Ford cast blame on Carter for the latter's charges of ineffectiveness on the part of the Federal Reserve Board due to his appointing of most of its members: "President Carter, when the going gets tough, will do anything to save his own political skin. This latest action by the president is cowardly."

On January 19, 1981, during a speech, Ford stated that he was in favor of the $9 billion being offered by the Carter administration to return the hostages in the Iran hostage crisis and said President-elect Reagan would take the oath of office the following day " and inherit a full platter of difficult problems, including runaway stagflation, the dangers of military weakness and dependence on foreign oil."

=== Ronald Reagan ===
Following the attempted assassination of Ronald Reagan, Ford told reporters while appearing at a fundraiser for Thomas Kean that criminals who use firearms should get the death penalty in the event someone is injured with the weapon. On March 23, 1981, Ford met with Chinese leader Deng Xiaoping to transmit a message on the part of the Reagan administration that the new presidency would not see a departure of the past working relationship between the United States and China. In May 1981, Ford attended a luncheon organized by Peter Pocklington, advocating those attending become involved in politics to ensure Canada adopted free enterprise enabling policies in a similar manner to attempt by President Reagan to cut regulations.

On May 12, 1981, Ford called for the United States, the Soviet Union, and other countries to work toward avoiding what "could be a flash point of an outbreak of military conflict on a broad scale" within the Middle East. In August 1981, Ford stated that Reagan's advisors did not tamper anything in their delay to inform the president of the assault by Libyan jets on U.S. fighter planes, furthering that he was not in a position to criticize them and that President Reagan would have been notified were the attack to have been more costly.

In September 1981, Ford advised Reagan against succumbing to Wall Street demands and follow his own agenda for the economic policies of the US during an appearance on Good Morning America: "He shouldn't let the gurus of Wall Street decide what the economic future of this country is going to be. They are wrong in my opinion." On October 14, Ford stated his disapproval for the House of Representatives voting against the Reagan administration's $8.5 billion Saudi arms package and his support for Reagan's economic policy, stating that Reagan "inherited an economic mess from his predecessor, and it needed shock therapy. In six months the economy should be turning upward." On October 20, 1981, Ford stated stopping the Reagan administration's Saudi arms package could have a large negative impact to American relations in the Middle East during a news conference.

On November 12, in response to a published story in which Budget Director David Stockman referred to President Reagan's tax cut program as a "Trojan horse" effort to assist the wealthy, Ford stated that Stockman's inexperience had led him to "let his conversation run away." He also asserted that the comments would not hinder President Reagan's economic recovery program, which in his view would be vindicated with the passage of time should Americans approve of it. On December 11, Ford met with President Reagan in the Oval Office for discussions on Libyan threats against the United States and how the latter's administration would counter it. While speaking to reporters afterward, Ford stated that he believed the administration could achieve a balanced budget and "should set a goal and say we're going to have a balanced budget in 1983, 1984 or 1985."

In January 1982, Ford delivered an address to the Houston Republican Club in which he predicted the economy would see an improvement by the middle of the year in the event that President Reagan honor past pledges and not "flip-flop like his predecessors." On February 1, Ford stated that he was in favor of the New Federalism proposal by the Reagan administration and Reaganomics would come into effect soon enough for Republican candidates to be benefited during the midterms that year. On March 24, 1982, Ford offered an endorsement of President Reagan's economic policies while also stating the possibility of Reagan being met with a stalemate by Congress if not willing to compromise while in Washington.

On April 1, 1982, during an interview in New York City, Ford advocated that the Reagan administration implement the trimming of outlays for major new weapons systems and rejected claims that modest slowdown in nuclear weapon delivery would tamper national security as "hogwash". Days later, during a speech, Ford stated the Reagan administration would be better suited deterring aggression with "a margin of superiority in national security" as opposed to President Reagan's proposed arm buildups. In May, while speaking to reporters during his attendance of a Home Builders Association of Maryland political fundraiser, Ford stated his optimism for Congress to arrive at a budget compromise: "They muddle around in the Congress, but they always seem to get the job done."

In July 1982, while speaking to the Forum Club of Houston, Ford expressed his differences with President Reagan's proposed balanced budget amendment to the Constitution and said the only way to prevent budget deficits was through electing members of Congress that would not be in favor of spending beyond the revenue of the government. In November, while addressing a crowd at Salem State College, Ford stated the only issue Americans were facing was a slow economy that would be reversed eventually and his views that the election would not be repudiation of Reaganomics but that the conclusion would move both parties "toward the center."

In April 1983, Ford attended a civics lecture and question-and-answer session at Rutgers University's Eagleton Institute of Politics, where he stated his support for the Reagan administration's economic policies and that the US faced the possibility of an economic recovery.

In April 1984, while in Farmington, Connecticut, Ford advocated for the withdrawal of United States Attorney General nominee Edwin Meese in the aftermath of criticism leveled at Meese's finances and said that he faced similar trials in the confirmation of nominees during his own presidency. Ford also stated, "I think there have been more individuals than I would have liked who have been careless in how they handled certain activities. I don't think anything criminal has been done, but there has been a degree of carelessness which I don't think should be condoned."

On June 22, 1985, Ford was among four former western heads of state to voice support for President Reagan's decision to not comply with terrorists in Beirut that were holding American hostages.

In an August 6, 1987 interview with David Frost, Ford stated that the Iran-Contra affair was not as serious as Watergate but that he would not have swapped arms for hostages and overruled his Secretaries of State and Defense.

=== Bill Clinton ===
In August 1993, Ford joined President Clinton for golf in Vail, Colorado, Ford telling reporters that he shared similar views with the incumbent president on the North American Free Trade Agreement and would assist in any way he could in securing its passage. On September 14, Ford attended a White House ceremony to promote the North American Free Trade Agreement and warned that not passing NAFTA would guarantee a wave of illegal immigration into the United States: "If you defeat Nafta, you have to share the responsibility for increased immigration to the United States, where they want jobs that are presently being held by Americans."

After the impeachment of Bill Clinton, Ford and Carter wrote an op-ed for The New York Times calling on the president to be censured in a bipartisan resolution.

In April 1999, Ford stated that President Clinton had made mistakes in his response to Kosovo, faulting Clinton for having an only military air campaign and not foreseeing the event.

In May 2000, Ford made a joint appearance with Carter and Clinton for support of the Clinton administration's trade deal with China.

== Health problems ==
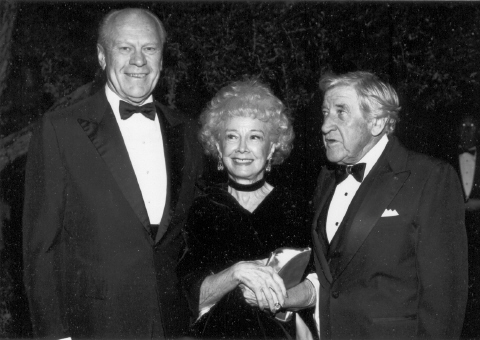
Gerald Ford, Anne T. Hill, and Edgar L. McCoubrey, Rancho Mirage California

In February 1983, Ford underwent arthroscopic surgery at the Eisenhower Medical Center for the treatment of a football injury.

In June 1983, Ford underwent elective urologic surgery at Eisenhower Medical Center.

On April 4, 1990, Ford was admitted to Eisenhower Medical Center for surgery to replace his left knee, orthopedic surgeon Dr. Robert Murphy saying "Ford's entire left knee was replaced with an artificial joint, including portions of the adjacent femur, or thigh bone, and tibia, or leg bone."

Ford suffered two minor strokes at the 2000 Republican National Convention, but made a quick recovery after being admitted to Hahnemann University Hospital. In January 2006, he spent 11 days at the Eisenhower Medical Center near his residence at Rancho Mirage, California, for treatment of pneumonia. On April 23, 2006, President George W. Bush visited Ford at his home in Rancho Mirage for a little over an hour. This was Ford's last public appearance and produced the last known public photos, video footage, and voice recording.

While vacationing in Vail, Colorado, Ford was hospitalized for two days in July 2006 for shortness of breath. On August 15 he was admitted to St. Mary's Hospital of the Mayo Clinic in Rochester, Minnesota, for testing and evaluation. On August 21, it was reported that he had been fitted with a pacemaker. On August 25, he underwent an angioplasty procedure at the Mayo Clinic. On August 28, Ford was released from the hospital and returned with his wife Betty to their California home. On October 13, he was scheduled to attend the dedication of a building of his namesake, the Gerald R. Ford School of Public Policy at the University of Michigan, but due to poor health and on the advice of his doctors he did not attend. The previous day, Ford had entered the Eisenhower Medical Center for undisclosed tests; he was released on October 16. By November 2006, he was confined to a bed in his study.

== Other activities ==
=== Relations and work with Jimmy Carter ===
During the term of office of his successor, Jimmy Carter, Ford received monthly briefs by President Carter's senior staff on international and domestic issues, and was always invited to lunch at the White House whenever he was in Washington, D.C. Their close friendship developed after Carter had left office, with the catalyst being their trip together to the funeral of Anwar el-Sadat in 1981.

Until Ford's death, Carter and his wife, Rosalynn, visited the Fords' home frequently. Ford and Carter served as honorary co-chairs of the National Commission on Federal Election Reform in 2001 and of the Continuity of Government Commission in 2002. The latter commission recommended improvements to continuity of government measures for the federal government.

=== Other ===
Gerald Ford and Roy W. Hill, Rancho Mirage California

In June 1981, officials of Dartmouth College stated Ford and Lady Bird Johnson would serve as co-chairs of the fundraising committee for the Rockefeller Center for the Social Sciences.

On August 16, 1981, while speaking to the Louisiana Retail Food Dealers Association, Ford stated the prosecution of the 12,000 striking members of the Professional Air Traffic Controllers Organization for criminal contempt would be overzealous on the part of the Justice Department.

In October 1981, Ford joined President Reagan and Bob Hope for a Washington event commemorating the fortieth anniversary of the United Service Organization.

On March 14, 1982, following a visit to Kuwait and attending a board meeting of the Santa Fe International Corporation, Ford stated that he was willing to meet with Yasir Arafat on the condition that Arafat "recognize that any such meeting would mean an admission on his part that Israel would be recognized by him and his people." Ford also clarified that he would not be representing the United States.

In April 1982, during an appearance at the annual meeting luncheon of Fidelity Trust Company of Toronto, Ford stated that he was convinced the United States would assist Great Britain in the event that the invasion of the Falkland Islands resulted in war and voiced approval for the US's role in the conflict as a way of "exerting maximum effort to avoid a military confrontation."

Ford founded the annual AEI World Forum in 1982, and joined the American Enterprise Institute as a distinguished fellow. He was awarded an honorary doctorate at Central Connecticut State University on March 23, 1988.

During an August 1982 fundraising reception, Ford stated his opposition to a constitution amendment requiring the US to have a balanced budget, citing a need to elect "members of the House and Senate who will immediately when Congress convenes act more responsibly in fiscal matters."

Ford was a participant in the 1982 midterm elections. In March, Ford endorsed Connecticut Senator Lowell P. Weicker Jr. and raised US$50,000 for the Weicker campaign in addition to attending a fundraising dinner that was noted as allowing Weicker to counter claims by his opponent Prescott Bush Jr. that he was without proper standing within the Republican Party. In October, Ford traveled to Tennessee to help Republican candidates in the state. Ford spent part of that month campaigning for Jon S. Fossel and criticized the record of his opponent Richard Ottinger as being indicative of wanting massive spending on the part of the government. He also traveled to Pekin, Illinois to advocate for the re-election of Robert Michel who he stated voting for was administering a medicine for the economy's recovery. By that time, he espoused the view that Republicans would retain control of the Senate while losing some governorships and seats in the House of Representatives.

On February 10, 1983, Ford and Carter made a joint appearance at the Ford Presidential Library in their capacities as co-chairmen of a conference on public policy and communications, Ford stating that the complexity of contemporary issues was widening a gap between the President and Americans thanks to media seeking out entertainment and public opinion polls answered by lobbyists that reflect the views espoused by special interest groups.

On February 28, 1983, Ford appeared with former presidents Carter and Nixon at a reception celebrating the service of Hyman G. Rickover and the launch of the Rickover Foundation, Ford stating during the appearance that Rickover had made the country more secure.

In January 1984, a letter signed by Ford and Carter and urging world leaders to extend their failed effort to end world hunger was released and sent to Secretary-General of the United Nations Javier Pérez de Cuéllar.

On April 10, 1984, Ford endorsed Elliot Richardson in his senatorial bid in Massachusetts, calling him the most qualified of the candidates. Richardson went on to lose the election.

In May 1984, 1984 Republican National Convention manager Ron Walker stated that President Reagan had spoken with Ford via a phone call and that the latter would be in attendance to the convention.

In September 1986, Ford participated in a two-day seminar at the Gerald R. Ford Symposium to mark the fifth anniversary of the Gerald R. Ford Presidential Museum and raise funds.

In 1987, Ford testified before the Senate Judiciary Committee in favor of District of Columbia Circuit Court judge and former Solicitor General Robert Bork after Bork was nominated by President Reagan to be an Associate Justice of the United States Supreme Court. Bork's nomination was rejected by a vote of 58–42.

In 1987 Ford's Humor and the Presidency, a book of humorous political anecdotes, was published.

By 1988, Ford was a member of several corporate boards including Commercial Credit, Nova Pharmaceutical, The Pullman Company, Tesoro Petroleum, and Tiger International, Inc. Ford also became an honorary director of Citigroup, a position he held till his death.

In October 1990, Ford appeared in Gettysburg, Pennsylvania with Bob Hope to commemorate the centennial anniversary of the birth of former President Dwight D. Eisenhower, where the two unveiled a plaque with the signatures of each living former president.

In May 1991, Ford, in the capacity of being a private guest of the Formosa Plastics Group, met with President of Taiwan Lee Teng-hui to convey a goodwill message on the part of President Bush. He became the first major American political figure to visit Taipei since 1979.

In April 1991, Ford joined former presidents Richard Nixon, Ronald Reagan, and Jimmy Carter, in supporting the Brady Bill. Three years later, he wrote to the U.S. House of Representatives, along with Carter and Reagan, in support of the assault weapons ban.

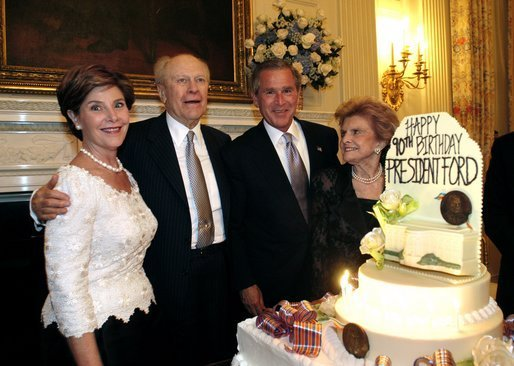
Ford at his 90th birthday with Laura Bush, President George W. Bush, and Betty Ford in the White House State Dining Room in 2003

In April 1997, Ford joined President Bill Clinton, former President Bush, and Nancy Reagan in signing the "Summit Declaration of Commitment" in advocating for participation by private citizens in solving domestic issues within the United States.

On January 20, 1998, during an interview at his Palm Springs home, Ford said the Republican Party's nominee in the 2000 presidential election would lose if very conservative in their ideals: "If we get way over on the hard right of the political spectrum, we will not elect a Republican President. I worry about the party going down this ultra-conservative line. We ought to learn from the Democrats: when they were running ultra-liberal candidates, they didn't win."

In the prelude to the impeachment of President Clinton, Ford conferred with former President Carter and the two agreed to not speak publicly on the controversy, a pact broken by Carter when answering a question from a student at Emory University.

In February 2001, Ford appeared at Chapman University to comment on papers written by students about his presidency and to be presented the Global Citizen medal.

In October 2001, Ford broke with conservative members of the Republican Party by stating that gay and lesbian couples "ought to be treated equally. Period." He became the highest ranking Republican to embrace full equality for gays and lesbians, stating his belief that there should be a federal amendment outlawing anti-gay job discrimination and expressing his hope that the Republican Party would reach out to gay and lesbian voters. He also was a member of the Republican Unity Coalition, which The New York Times described as "a group of prominent Republicans, including former President Gerald R. Ford, dedicated to making sexual orientation a non-issue in the Republican Party".

On November 22, 2004, New York Republican Governor George Pataki named Ford and the other living former Presidents (Carter, George H. W. Bush and Bill Clinton) as honorary members of the board rebuilding the World Trade Center.

In a pre-recorded embargoed interview with Bob Woodward of The Washington Post in July 2004, Ford stated that he disagreed "very strongly" with the Bush administration's choice of Iraq's alleged weapons of mass destruction as justification for its decision to invade Iraq, calling it a "big mistake" unrelated to the national security of the United States and indicating that he would not have gone to war had he been president. The details of the interview were not released until after Ford's death, as he requested.

== Reception ==
In 1983, Robert Lindsey expressed the view that Ford had become "a kind of one-man academic, business and political conglomerate" in his retirement who was the most active of the then-current three former presidents (Nixon, Carter, and himself).

Ford is credited with having started the pattern of former American presidents generating revenue through speeches. His paid speeches drew criticism from Nixon who charged him with "selling the office." Ford would defend his activities by stating that being a private citizen at the time of generating revenue from the addresses, "he could leverage his past however he pleased." Richard Cohen stressed the lasting negative impact of Ford's participation with business boards: "He sold what they were buying, which was the prestige of the presidency. As a result, it has less and less."
