= Aoyama Gakuin Women's Junior College =

Junior college in Tokyo, Japan

Coordinates: 35°39′38.82″N 139°42′37.17″E

- 青山学院女子短期大学
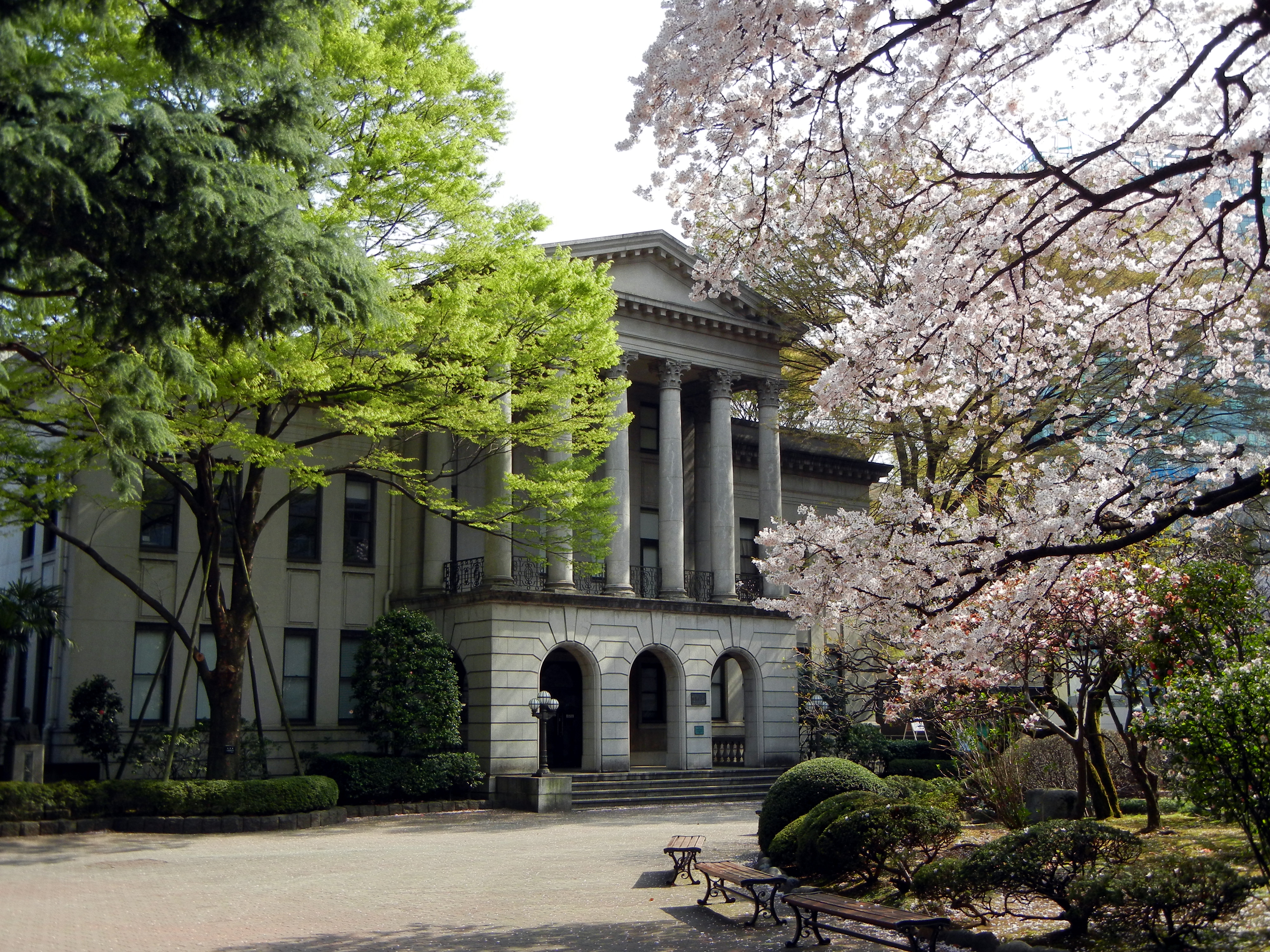
- Established: 1874
- Location: Tokyo, Japan
- Website: www.luce.aoyama.ac.jp

Aoyama Gakuin Women's Junior College (青山学院女子短期大学, Aoyama Gakuin Joshi Tanki Daigaku) was a junior college in Tokyo, Japan, and is part of the Aoyama Gakuin network.

The institute was founded in 1874 by Dora E. Schoonmaker, an American missionary sent to Japan by the Women's Foreign Missionary Society of the Methodist Episcopal Church.

The college suspended admissions in 2019, and closed in 2022 after graduating remaining students.
