= Roy Hill =

Roy Hill may refer to:

- Roy Hill mine, an iron ore mine in Western Australia
- Roy Hill railway, a railway line associated with the Roy Hill mine
- Roy Hill Station, a pastoral lease in Western Australia
- Roy W. Hill (1899-1986), American businessman and philanthropist
