= Bumiller Building =

- U.S. Historic district – Contributing property
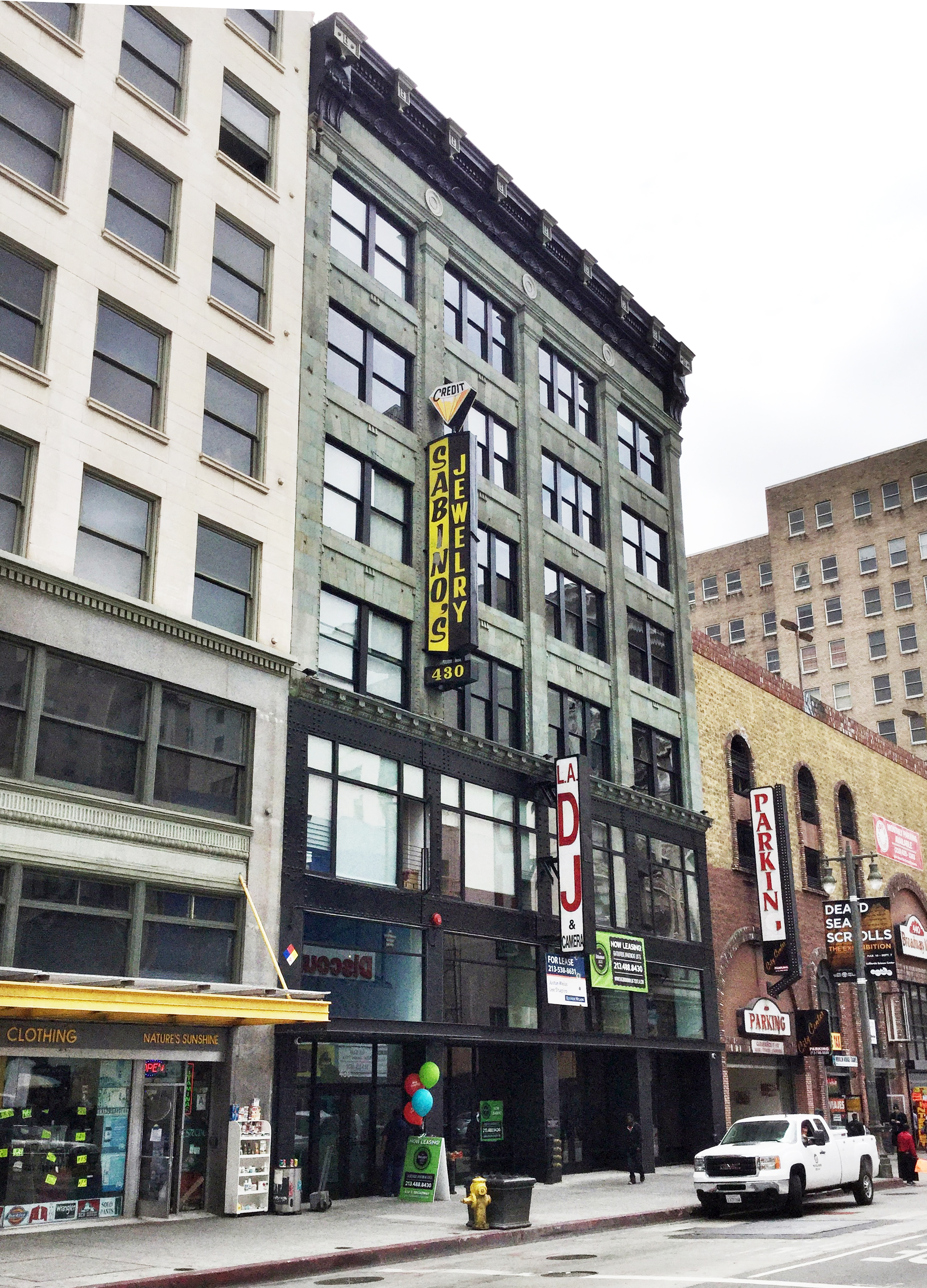
- The building in 2014

- Location within the Los Angeles metropolitan area
- Location: 430 South Broadway; Los Angeles, California
- Coordinates: 34.04863°N 118.24994°W
- Built: 1906
- Built by: Carl Leonhardt
- Architect: Morgan & Walls
- Architectural style: Renaissance Revival
- Part of: Broadway Theater and Commercial District (ID79000484)
- Designated CP: May 9, 1979

The Bumiller Building is a residential building in the Los Angeles Historic Broadway Theater District. Built in 1906 and designed by the architects Morgan & Walls, the Bumiller Building was constructed of reinforced concrete in Renaissance Revival style. Historically the building has been a department store and a theater.

== History ==
=== Opening ===
In 1906, the Bumiller Building was the home of a department store, the Bon Marché, owned by the Le Sage Brothers. Le Bon Marché occupied the first three floors and basement. Two freight elevators at the back of the building ran from the basement to the third floor for use of the store. The department store liquidated its goods to the J. M. Hale (Hale's) department store in September 1907 and closed, after which the freight elevators fell into disuse and were eliminated. Two Otis passenger elevators in the lobby ran from the basement to the sixth floor.

The next month the building became a branch of The Hub, a large clothier that started up in 1896 whose main store was at 157 N. Spring Street.

=== Early years ===
As the Broadway Theater District evolved, New York-based Eden Musée, a theater for motion pictures and vaudeville acts, moved in. With "a show on every floor," Eden Musée attracted audiences with afternoon and evening performances. After Eden Musée left, the Bumiller Building was home to the Wonderland Theater, then the Jade Theater, named for the jade hue of the building's facade. During Prohibition in 1921, firemen were called to the building to put out a blaze caused by a whiskey still, under which a gas fire had been lit. Tenants heard an explosion and when firemen arrived, one room was in flames. Firemen found sour mash and the ten gallon still blown to bits. The man who rented the room had already disappeared.

=== Today ===
The Bumiller Building, after extensive renovation, is now the Broadway Lofts, a residential rental with 58 apartments. Adaptive Reuse and architecture was completed by Los Angeles architecture firm Omgivning.

== Owners ==
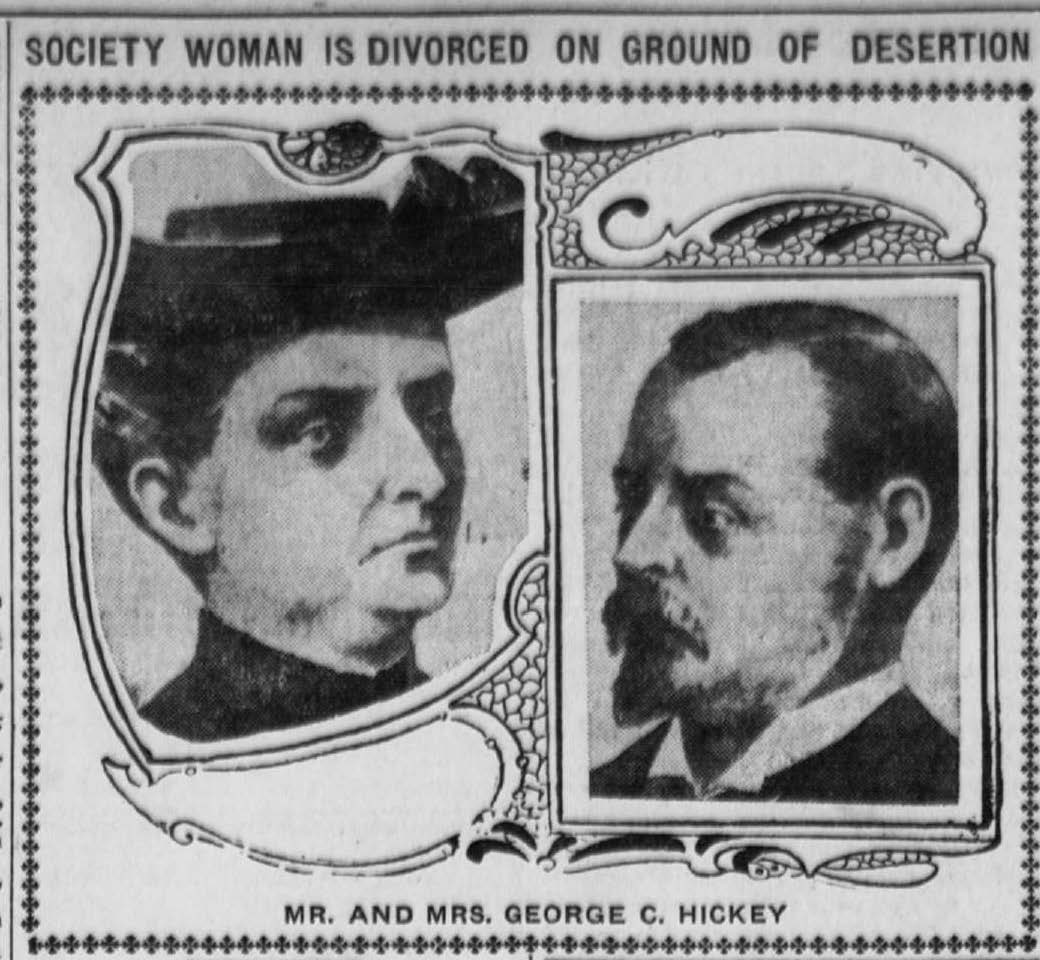
Caroline Bumiller Hickey, George C. Hickey, 1905

=== Bumiller Estate ===
Caroline Bumiller Hickey (née Gerstenberg, 1848–1932) was a wealthy German-born Los Angeles socialite, the widow of Jacob Bumiller, a Bavarian wine merchant, who had moved to Los Angeles from Brooklyn around 1871. Her house, 1049 South Elden Avenue, is now an historic-cultural monument of the Wilshire Historic District. She controlled the Bumiller Estate and had a highly publicized divorce from her second husband, George C. Hickey. At trial she claimed she was deaf and appeared in court elegantly dressed with an ear trumpet. Following 18 years of marriage, George Hickey accused his wife of desertion, and the court agreed. Nevertheless, George Hickey returned the lot at 430 South Broadway, which Caroline averred he had swindled from her. The owners of record of the Bumiller Building in 1912 were Caroline's children from her first marriage, Arthur W. Bumiller, Edna B. Sullivan, and Stella B. Burks.

=== Albert J. Wallace ===
Albert Joseph Wallace (February 11, 1853 – February 23, 1939) was a member of the Los Angeles City Council in 1907–09 and lieutenant governor of California in 1910–14. He acquired the Bumiller Building from Isabelle M. Anderson, 1935, in exchange for his two-story building at 425 South Broadway, occupied by the W. T. Grant Company.

=== Carroll White Blake ===
Carroll W. Blake, University of Nebraska, 1908

The owners of the Bumiller Building reflected the changes in the district. Carroll White Blake was a successful real estate investor and motion picture exhibitor. Born in Bowdoinham, Maine, April 12, 1885, he graduated from the Industrial College of the University of Nebraska (1908), arrived in Los Angeles in 1909 and served in World War I. In 1942 Blake bought the palatial California Theater, 810 S. Main Street, from Jack Lankershim, son of James Boon Lankershim, who had built it during World War I. After buying the Bumiller Building, Blake renamed it the Carroll W. Blake Building, and had his offices there. Blake divorced his wife, Josephine Terzenbach Blake, in 1934. He lived with his mother, Frances Blake, until her death in 1942. He then became engaged to a divorcée, Lillian Schramm, but died November 28, 1948, shortly before they were scheduled to be married at Christmas.

=== Lillian E. Schramm ===
Born in Arkansas, Lillian Evelyn Schramm (née Pugh, 1898–1952) was divorced from Dr. Alfred J. Schramm, Executive Secretary of the American College of Osteopathic Physicians, and the only College official who refused to take advantage of the 1962 California legislation allowing an osteopath to convert his degree to an MD. After the death of her fiancé, Carroll W. Blake, Lillian Schramm inherited the bulk of his property, although six of Blake's cousins contested the will, claiming Schramm feigned her love for Blake. Attorney Jerry Giesler represented the cousins. Schramm operated a beauty salon at the time of her own death, and left most of her million dollar estate for cancer research. The California State Board of Cosmetology was located on the second floor of the Bumiller Building, and gave their certifying exams there.

=== Dr. Harry Lehrer ===
Dr. Harry Lehrer (1904–1972) was a 1938 graduate of the College of Osteopathic Physicians and Surgeons (now the University of California, Irvine School of Medicine), and received a Doctor of Medicine degree after the 1962 California legislation allowing an osteopath to convert his degree to an MD. Lehrer bought the Bumiller Building from the Schramm estate in 1958, and had his medical offices there until his death in 1972. He added the ramp that converted the basement to a parking garage. He was married to fashion designer Anne T. Hill.

== See also ==
- List of contributing properties in the Broadway Theater and Commercial District
