= Yacki Raizizun =

American naturopath and occult writer

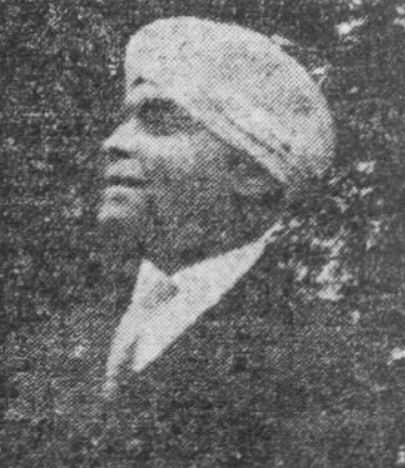
- Born: 17 May 1892; Bombay
- Died: 2 August 1966 (aged 74); El Paso
- Occupation: Naturopath
- Spouse: May Martinez Smith (m. 1941)

Yacki Raizizun (17 May 1892 – 2 August 1966) was an American naturopath, occult writer and yoga teacher.

== Life ==
Raizizun was born in Bombay to a French mother and Hindu father. He was educated in London and Sydney. He graduated from Amherst College and spent five years teaching philosophy. Raizizun married May Martinez Smith of Santa Fe, New Mexico in 1941. (Note: Martinez Raizizun (died 1976) was a children's book writer.)

Raizizun worked as a naturopath in an office at his home in Albuquerque. He specialized in the treatment of arthritis and goiter. He moved to El Paso 1951. Raizizun was described as holding a number of interesting and unusual ideas about yoga, including a method of removing wrinkles. In 1964, he commented that "yoga can produce anything from spot reducing to regenerating the human organism, with beauty treatments thrown in". His yoga method of face lifting consisted of him reaching into his clients mouth with his fingers and lifting their face. A photograph was published of him demonstrating the method on Anne T. Hill. He also featured for several weeks on a daily television show with Hill. Raizizun argued that anyone can study yoga and that as a philosophy it does not need to interfere with one's religion. He taught that there are seven phases of yoga, the first being Hatha yoga that is concerned with physical health and the highest Bhakti yoga concerned with knowledge and love.

He advertised himself as a "master metaphysician", lecturing on topics such as auras, esoteric psychology and personal magnetism. He was a speaker at spiritualist churches. He was president of the Occult Research Society of Chicago. Raizizun was the author of eight books.

== Vegetarianism ==
He was a vegetarian for ethical and health reasons, commenting that "It seems unbelievable that civilized man still continues to eat the corpses of animals for food. In spite of our boasted civilization, man has not evolved very far from his primitive habits. It has been scientifically and religiously proven that meat is unfit for human consumption".

== Death ==
Raizizun died at El Paso hospital on 2 August 1966. His funeral was held at St. Joseph Catholic Church.

== Selected publications ==
- Your Personal Forces and How to Develop Them. Chicago: Occult Research Society. 1923.
- Occult and Drugless Therapeutics. Chicago: Occult Research Society. 1924.
- Manuel on Occult Development. Chicago: Occult Research Society. 1927.
