= Odd Fellows Cemetery (Los Angeles) =

Cemetery in Los Angeles

Coordinates: 34.0234°N 118.1958°W

Odd Fellows Cemetery is a cemetery in the Boyle Heights neighborhood of Los Angeles, California. It is notable for specializing in cremation of obese individuals, especially those over 400 pounds (180 kg).

== Fetus burial ==
In 1985, 16,433 aborted fetuses were buried in unmarked graves at the cemetery on donated land. The fetuses were found in a shipping container in Woodland Hills, California in February 1982, and a three-year dispute over their burial ensued. The dispute reached the Supreme Court, who ruled the remains must be buried in a nonreligious ceremony. The burial included a eulogy by President Ronald Reagan, which was read at the 7 October 1985 service by Michael D. Antonovich.

== Notable interments ==
- William W. Fraser (died 1915) received the Medal of Honor for gallantry during the Siege of Vicksburg on 22 May 1863.
- Dr Harry Lehrer (died 1972) owned the Bumiller Building in Los Angeles.
- Billy Gilbert (died 1971) was a comedian and actor.
- Chris-Pin Martin (died 1953) was an American actor.
- Dora E. Schoonmaker (died 1934) Methodist missionary to Japan and educator.
