= Commercial High School =

Public school in Atlanta, Georgia, US

Coordinates: 33.750964°N 84.391286°W

- United States

Information
- Type: Public
- Established: 1889
- Enrollment: 1306 (in 1921)
- Campus type: Urban

Commercial High School was founded by Corinne Stanton Williams Douglas in Atlanta, Georgia, US. It began as a department of Girls High School in 1889 for girls who wanted to learn skills they could use in Atlanta's burgeoning business community. Students studied bookkeeping and typing, in addition to mathematics and history courses. The school soon expanded into new space, a four-story brick building at 138 Pryor Street in downtown Atlanta.

In 1910, school superintendent William F. Dykes made Commercial High Atlanta's first co-educational high school. Like Girls High, Commercial High had its own bank.

The school closed in June 1947.

== Notable graduates ==
- Anne T. Hill, fashion designer
