= Harry Lehrer =

American physician

Harry Lehrer, DO (later Harry Lehrer, MD)
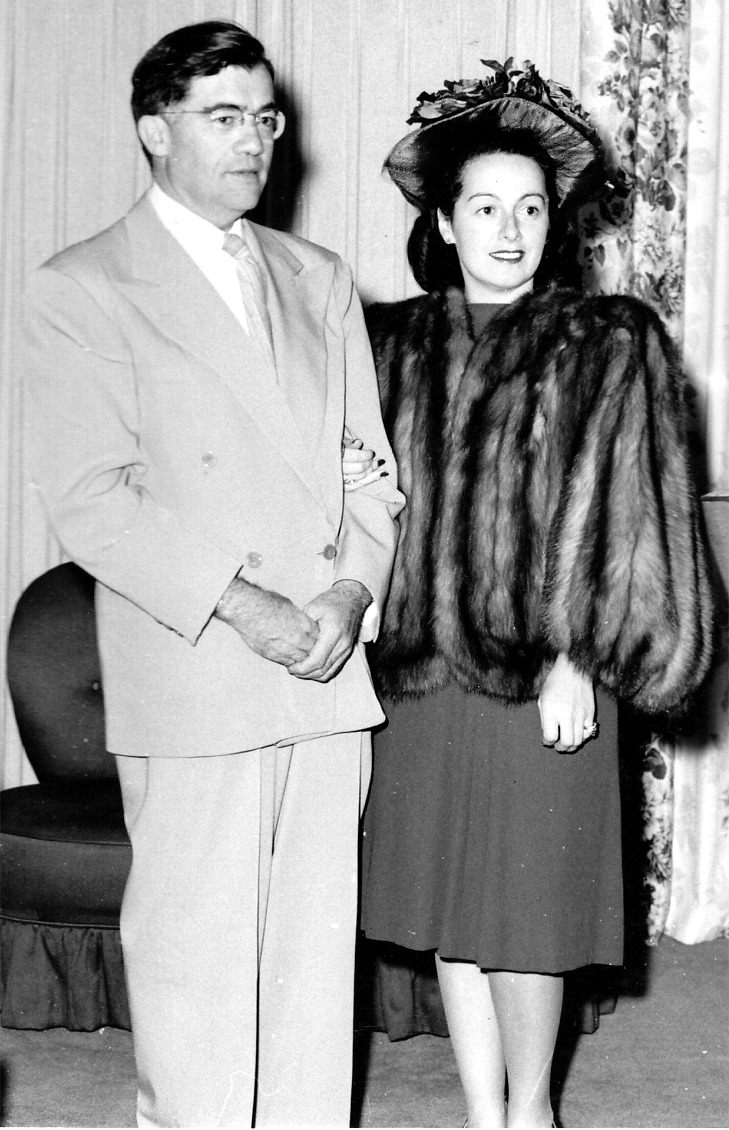
- Harry Lehrer and his wife Anne T. Hill in 1940
- Born: October 15, 1904; Saint Louis, Missouri, US
- Died: June 26, 1972 (aged 67); Los Angeles, US
- Occupations: Pharmacist, physician, real estate speculator
- Known for: ownership of Bumiller Building
- Spouse: Anne T. Hill

Harry Lehrer (October 15, 1904 – June 26, 1972) was an American licensed pharmacist, physician, and real estate speculator who owned the Bumiller Building in Los Angeles.

== Early years and education ==
Dr. Harry Lehrer (left), Gypsy Boots (right) 1967, at Lehrer's home, 704 N. Beverly Drive, the former Beverly Hills home of Billy Wilder

Working as a stenographer for a wholesale grocery company, Lehrer took a California pharmacy board review course at night and was certified by examination as a pharmacist in 1924. Lehrer attended the University of Southern California and UCLA. He was a 1938 graduate of the College of Osteopathic Physicians and Surgeons (now the University of California, Irvine School of Medicine). Lehrer received a Doctor of Medicine degree after the 1962 California legislation allowing an osteopath to convert his degree to an MD. While running a pharmacy in the Boyle Heights neighborhood of Los Angeles, he was from time to time a robbery victim. In one instance, a 21-year-old medical student robbed Lehrer of $271. A judge sentenced the student to 10 years' probation and summer vacation in the county jail. In 1938, Lehrer opened a medical office, La Clinica Sano, and pharmacy, La Farmacia Sano, at 124 North Main Street. He spoke fluent Spanish, had a Spanish language radio program, and applied for a broadcast license in 1943.

== Later years ==
Lehrer had his medical offices at 139 South Broadway in Los Angeles, when he acquired a group of neighboring tenement buildings in the early 1950s, anticipating that the State of California would take them under Eminent domain to build a new California State Building. Lehrer was unable to obtain financing to buy one additional building, a former Thrifty Drug Store, 133-135 South Broadway; its owner was Gabriel Laskin. When California did condemn the buildings, Hodge L. Dolle, an attorney known for his expertise in eminent domain, represented Lehrer. The tenement buildings have since been demolished and the land, acquired by the state, has passed to the city and may become a public park.

Lynne Roberts (left), Sally Naiditch, Anne T. Hill (3rd from left), Dr. Leon W. Naiditch, Hyman B. Samuels (front right), Dr. Harry Lehrer (extreme right behind Samuels)

(left to right) Dr. Harry Lehrer, Jean R. Miller, Anne T. Hill, Indra Devi, Los Angeles 1965

== Bumiller Building ==
Lehrer bought the Bumiller Building from the estate of Lillian E. Schramm in 1958, and had his medical offices on the ground floor until his death in 1972. Built in 1906, the Bumiller Building, designed by the architects Morgan & Walls, was constructed of reinforced concrete in Renaissance Revival style. It is today part of the Los Angeles Historic Broadway Theater District.

== Personal ==
Lehrer was married to fashion designer Anne T. Hill. Dr. Clarence H. Nelson treated Lehrer when he became ill in 1960. Lehrer is interred in the Odd Fellows Cemetery (Los Angeles).
