= Carolyn Bumiller-Hickey House =

Historic residence in Los Angeles

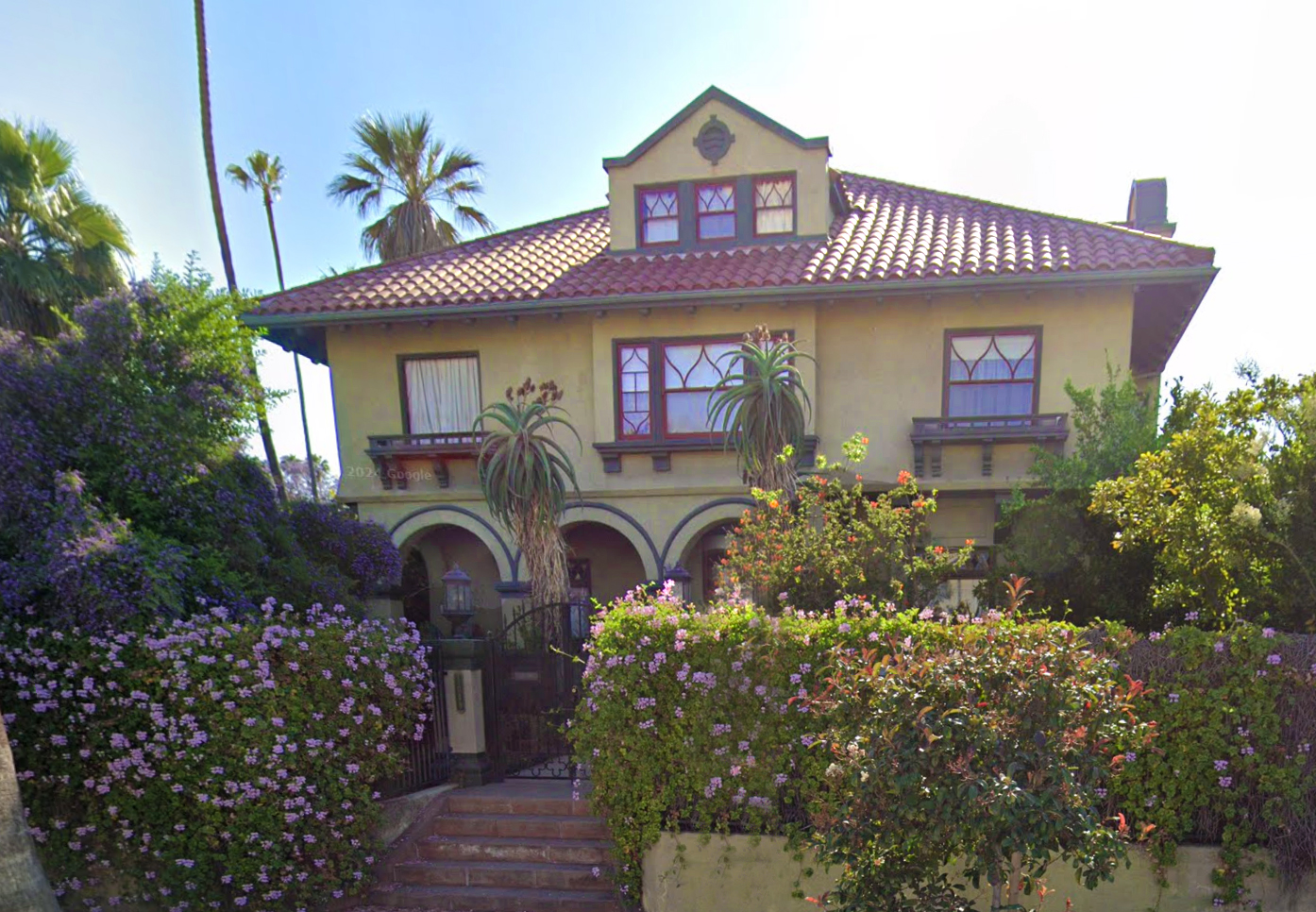
- Front façade of the Carolyn Bumiller-Hickey House
- Interactive map of Carolyn Bumiller-Hickey House

General information
- Architectural style: Mission Revival, Craftsman
- Location: 1049 South Elden Avenue, Los Angeles, California
- Coordinates: 34.05228°N 118.28982°W
- Year built: c. 1904
- Owner: Private

Technical details
- Floor count: 2
- Known for: Historic residence of Caroline Bumiller-Hickey

Carolyn Bumiller-Hickey House is a historic residence located at 1049 South Elden Avenue in the Pico-Union neighborhood of Los Angeles, California. Built circa 1904, the home is a well-preserved example of Mission Revival architecture with transitional Craftsman elements. The house is associated with early 20th-century socialite Caroline Bumiller-Hickey, and was designated as Los Angeles Historic-Cultural Monument #794 on May 4, 2005. The monument is officially listed under the name "Carolyn Bumiller-Hickey House" in city records, though historical sources confirm the correct spelling of her name is Caroline.

== Historical significance ==
The house was constructed for Caroline Bumiller-Hickey (née Gerstenberg, 1848–1932), a wealthy German-born Los Angeles socialite and the widow of Jacob Bumiller, a Bavarian wine merchant. She managed the Bumiller Estate, which included several properties in downtown Los Angeles, and was a notable figure in early 20th-century Los Angeles society.

Following her second marriage to George C. Hickey, Caroline became the subject of a highly publicized divorce. During the trial, she claimed to be deaf and appeared in court elegantly dressed with an ear trumpet. After 18 years of marriage, George Hickey accused her of desertion, and the court granted him the divorce.

== Architecture ==
The Carolyn Bumiller-Hickey House is a well-preserved example of Mission Revival residential architecture with transitional Craftsman interior elements. The building features a low-pitched roof, arched porch supports, plain plaster walls, and Islamic-inspired detailing consistent with the Mission Revival style. Interior features include original hardwood flooring, decorative tilework, original gas light fixtures, and carved wood details throughout the living spaces.

Remarkably, the residence at 1049 South Elden Avenue has had only three owners in over 100 years, a continuity of stewardship that has contributed significantly to the preservation of its original architectural integrity and historic character.

== Preservation ==
The Carolyn Bumiller-Hickey House was designated a Los Angeles Historic-Cultural Monument on May 4, 2005, as HCM #794. The designation ensures that any proposed alterations to the property are subject to review by the City of Los Angeles Cultural Heritage Commission to preserve its historical and architectural integrity.
