= Dora E. Schoonmaker =

American missionary

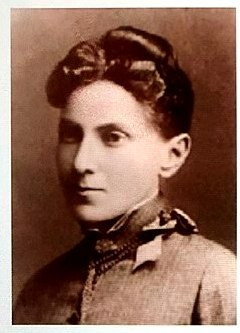
- Born: November 14, 1851; Olive, New York
- Died: December 5, 1934 (aged 83); Los Angeles, California
- Burial place: Odd Fellows Cemetery
- Religion: Methodism

Dora E. Schoonmaker (1851–1934) was a Methodist missionary and a founding teacher of "Joshi Shogakko (女子小学校: Girls' Elementary School)" in Azabu-Shimborichō, Tokyo, which developed into Aoyama Gakuin in Shibuya, Tokyo.

== Early life ==
Dora E. Schoonmaker was born on November 14, 1851, in the town of Olive, Ulster County, New York, the daughter of Jacob and Patience Schoonmaker.

== Mission to Japan ==
Initially, she was a public school teacher in Morris, Illinois. However, she wanted to go abroad as a missionary and was sent to Japan on October 28, 1874 (at the age of 23) by the Woman's Foreign Missionary Society of the Methodist Episcopal Church in the United States. She was the first female missionary in Japan.

In the same year, she opened "Joshi Shogakko," the oldest origin of Aoyama Gakuin and a pioneering school for girls' education in the Meiji era, at Heizo Okada's residence in Azabu-Hommurachō, later moved to Azabu-Shimborichō, and served as its principal until she returned to the United States. The school was forced to change its name to "Kyusei Gakko (救世学校, Salvation School" and "Kaigan Jyogakko (海岸女学校, Coastal Girls' School)" due to criticism of Christianity, but later developed into Aoyama Gakuin.

== Later life ==
On November 3, 1879, after five years of service, she returned to the United States. She married Henry Martin Soper (not to be confused with Julius Soper) and had a son, Duane.

When the Kaigan Girls' School, the successor to the Girls' Elementary School, was destroyed by fire, she made a pilgrimage to raise funds for its reconstruction. She died on December 5, 1934, and was buried at Odd Fellows Cemetery in Boyle Heights, Los Angeles.

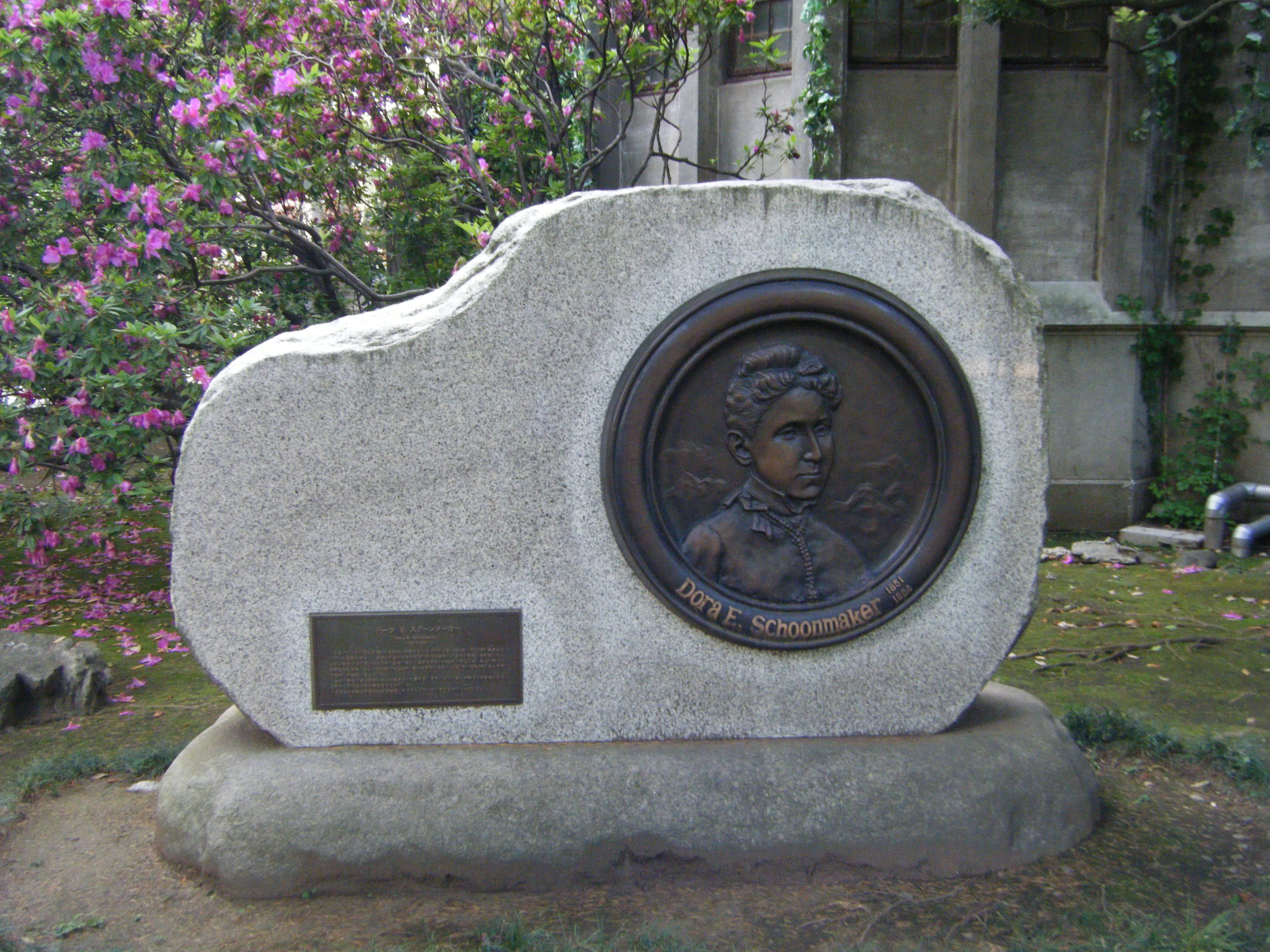
Dora E. Schoonmaker monument in AGU

In commemoration of her achievements, a stone monument has now been erected in front of the AGU Berry Hall on the Aoyama Campus, Shibuya-ku, Tokyo.
