= Aoyama Gakuin =

Educational institute in Tokyo, Japan

Coordinates: 35°39′40″N 139°42′38″E

- 青山学院
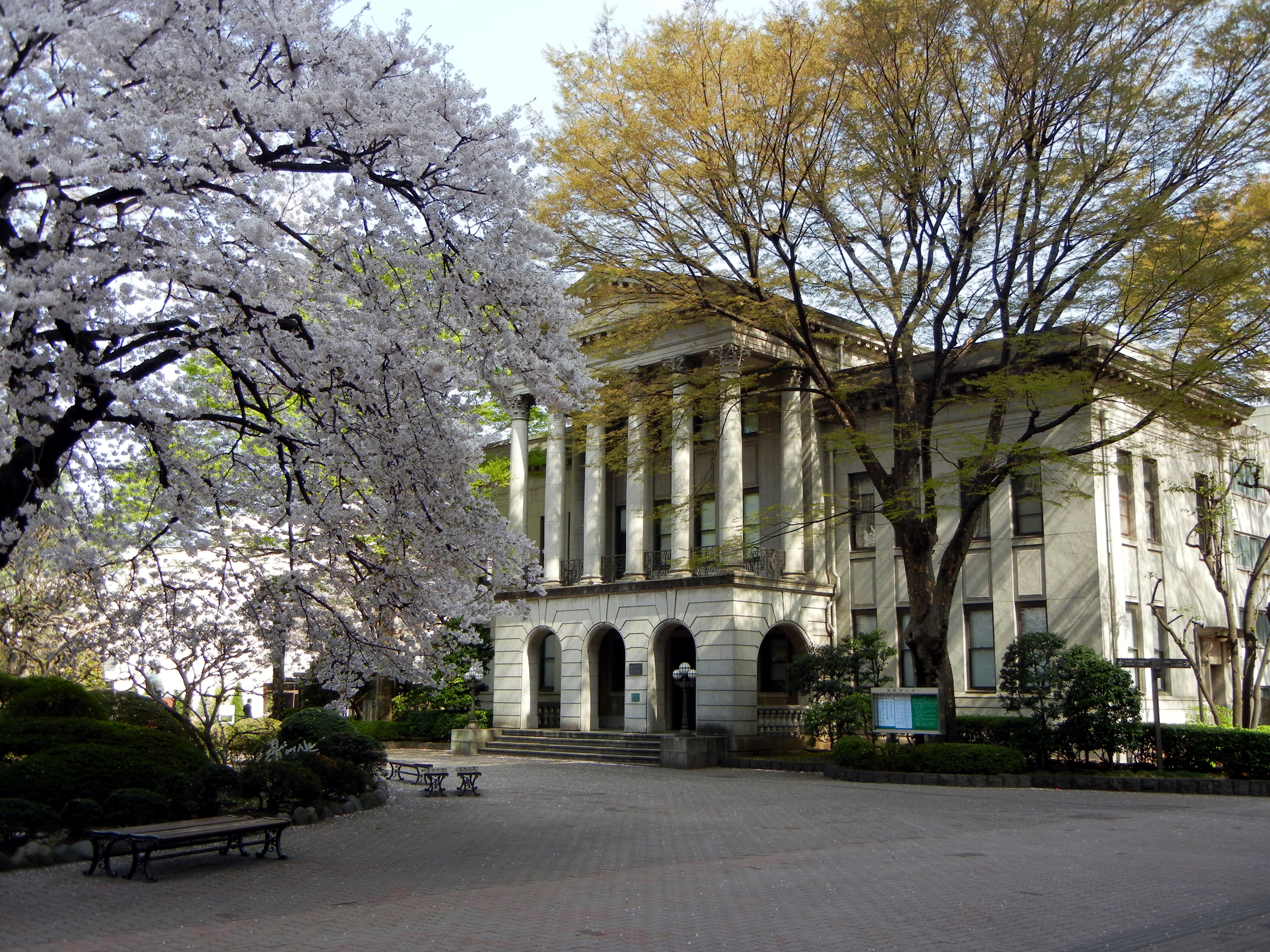
- Aoyama Gakuin University Majima Memorial Hall
- Motto: "Salt of the Earth, Light of the World"
- Established: 1874
- Affiliations: United Methodist Church and the United Church of Christ in Japan
- Location: Shibuya, Tokyo, Japan
- Website: www.aoyama.ac.jp

Aoyama Gakuin School Corporation (学校法人青山学院, Gakkō Hōjin Aoyama Gakuin) is an educational institute in Tokyo, Japan, which comprises Aoyama Gakuin University, Aoyama Gakuin Senior High School, Aoyama Gakuin Junior High School, Aoyama Gakuin Elementary School, and Aoyama Gakuin Kindergarten.

The institute was founded in 1874 by Dora E. Schoonmaker, an American missionary sent to Japan by the Women's Foreign Missionary Society of the Methodist Episcopal Church. Canadian missionary Davidson Macdonald MD played a role in the establishment of Aoyama Gakuin, and his contribution to the improvement of Japan's educational system is considered an important episode in the early history of Japanese-Canadian relations.

== Notable alumni ==
- Rie fu (singer-songwriter)
- Fuzjko Hemming (pianist)
- Renhō (member of the house of councilors, consumer affairs minister)
- Tsuyoshi Takagi (member of the house of representatives, Minister for Reconstruction)
- Shunichi Yamaguchi (member of the house of representatives, Minister of state for science and technology policy)
- Haruko Arimura (member of the House of councilors, Minister in charge of women's activities)
- Ikuma Dan (Japanese composer)
- Shin Dong-bin (CEO of the Korean Lotte Group)
- Shinobu Terajima (Japanese actress, Winner of the Best Actress award at the 60th Berlin Film Festival)
- Hajime Satomi (the founder of Sammy Corporation)
- Ryo Morikawa (president of LINE)
- Shinichi Koide (president of Hewlett-Packard Japan)
- Ryuichi Isaka (president of Seven-Eleven Japan)
- Akiko Yano (Pop and jazz musician)

== See also ==
- Aoyama Gakuin University
