= Edgar L. McCoubrey =

American politician (1904–2001)

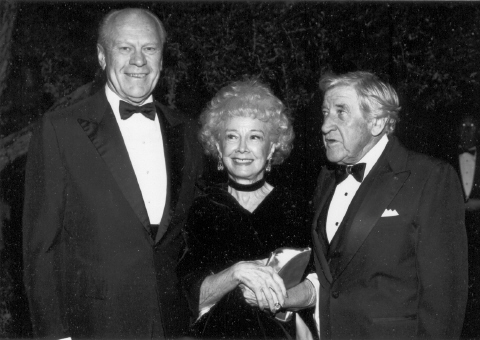
- Gerald Ford, Anne T. Hill and Edgar L. McCoubrey

10th Mayor of Palm Springs
- In office April 19, 1966 – April 24, 1967
- Preceded by: George Beebe, Jr.
- Succeeded by: Howard Wiefels

Personal details
- Born: Edgar Louis McCoubrey; August 29, 1904 St. John's, Newfoundland, Canada
- Died: February 19, 2001 (aged 96) Rancho Mirage, California, U.S.
- Party: Republican
- Spouse(s): Jean Lyon Daynes (1932–1947, her death); Anne T. Hill (1990–1999, her death)
- Occupation: Automobile dealer

Edgar Louis McCoubrey (August 29, 1904 – February 19, 2001) was a Canadian-American automobile dealer and politician who was the 10th Mayor of Palm Springs, California.

== Early years ==
McCoubrey was born in St. John's, Newfoundland Colony. He emigrated to the United States on August 26, 1920, and became a naturalized citizen on February 6, 1940.

== Career ==
McCoubrey began his automotive career in 1926 with GMAC (now Ally Financial) as a credit manager. In 1936, McCoubrey and his wife, Jean Lyon Daynes McCoubrey, acquired a dealership, Rubidoux Motor Co. (now Dutton Motor Co.), in Riverside, California, where they sold Oldsmobiles, Cadillacs and GMCs. The partners opened Palm Springs' Plaza Motors in 1938 with the same makes, adding Pontiac and Buick in 1996. A famous customer who got away was Elvis Presley. One day Elvis, dressed in his all black signature style, including black silk shirt, black leather jacket, and black wrap-around sunglasses, strolled into Plaza Motors and demanded a black Cadillac on the spot. "We explained that we didn't keep black cars in stock because of the desert climate," McCoubrey said. "He wanted it that day. We could order one for him, but he didn't want to wait."

== Politics ==
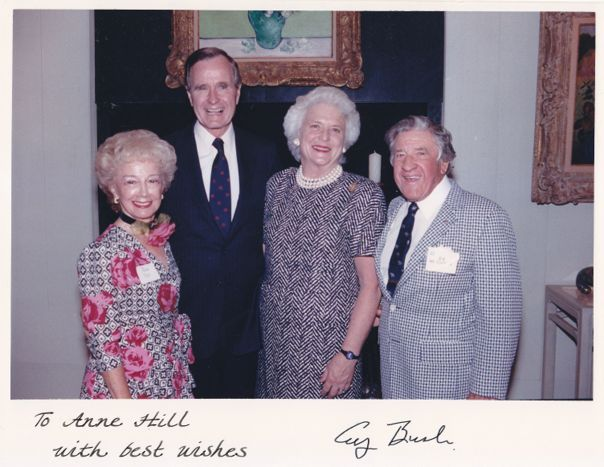
Anne T. Hill, Edgar L. McCoubrey, George H. W. Bush and Barbara Bush

McCoubrey was the 10th Mayor of Palm Springs, California, April 19, 1966 – April 24, 1967. He was chairman of a rally hosted for Dwight D. Eisenhower in 1956. As Palm Springs Chamber of Commerce President, McCoubrey received President John F. Kennedy during a 1963 visit. McCoubrey was a Delegate to the Republican National Convention from California, 1972.

== Death ==
McCoubrey died in Rancho Mirage in 2001. The Edgar McCoubrey Memorial Scholarship Award was established in his memory.
