= Roy W. Hill =

American businessman and philanthropist (1899–1986)

- (left to right) Alex Dreier, Bob Hope, Anne T. Hill, Geraldine Dreier, Roy W. Hill at a fund raiser for Eisenhower Medical Center
- Born: December 1, 1899; Los Angeles, California, US
- Died: February 14, 1986 (aged 86); Rancho Mirage, California, US
- Occupations: automobile dealer hospital trustee philanthropist
- Known for: trustee and benefactor of Eisenhower Medical Center
- Spouse(s): Madeleine M. Hill (married 1924, divorced); Faye D Maxwell (1942–1969, divorced); Anne T. Hill (1971–1986, his death)
- Awards: Custom Tailors Guild of America named Roy Hill one of America's ten best dressed men

Roy William Hill (December 1, 1899 – February 14, 1986) was an American automobile dealer, philanthropist, and early trustee and benefactor of Eisenhower Medical Center.

== Early years ==
Hill was the son of Maurice C. Hill, a sheet metal worker, and Bulah A. Hill.

== Career ==
Roy W. Hill and Gerald Ford

Hill spent 25 years with General Motors, initially in Dallas, a period in which promotions and assignments sent him to various U.S. cities. He rose to be Dallas Regional Manager for Chevrolet and testified for the company in a 1939 antitrust suit. He resigned to establish his own retail automobile business and extended the business to nine Texas cities, New Mexico and California. In 1964, the Custom Tailors Guild of America named Hill as one of America's ten best-dressed men, along with Chicago Mayor Richard J. Daley.

== Eisenhower Medical Center ==
Hill was among the early trustees of Eisenhower Medical Center and was elected concurrently with Martha Hyer. He subsequently participated in the raising of more than a million dollars for the Medical Center.

== Death ==
Hill died in Rancho Mirage, California in 1986.
