= Eisenhower Medical Center =

Geography
- Location: 39-000 Bob Hope Drive, Rancho Mirage, Riverside County, Coachella Valley region, California
- Coordinates: 33°45′48″N 116°24′20″W

Organisation
- Type: General

Services
- Standards: General Acute Care Hospital
- Beds: 476

History
- Founded: 1969

Links
- Website: https://eisenhowerhealth.org/

The Eisenhower Medical Center (EMC) now known as Eisenhower Health is a nonprofit teaching hospital based in Rancho Mirage, California, serving the Coachella Valley region of Southeastern California. It was named one of the top one hundred hospitals in the United States in 2024.

== History ==
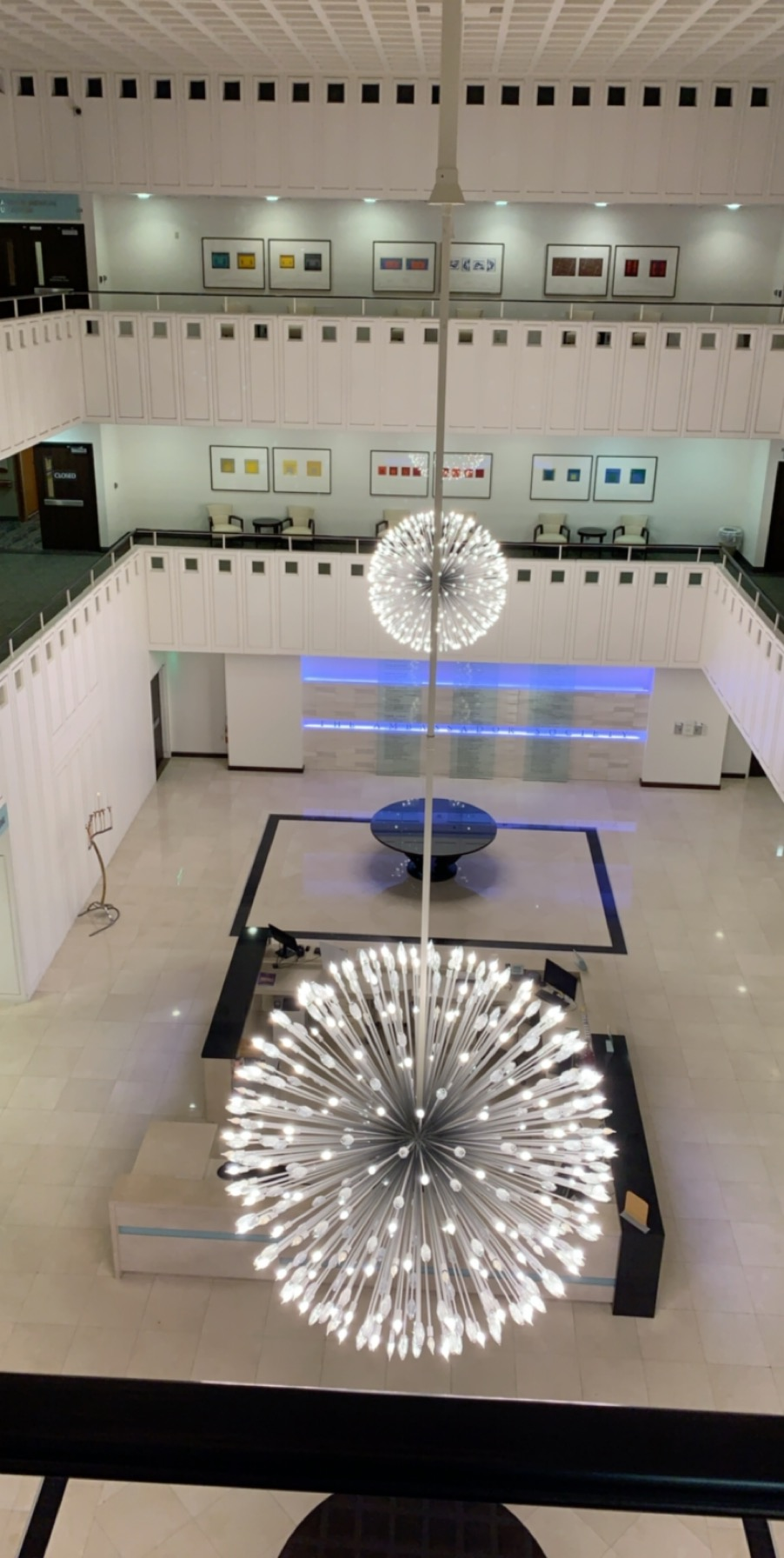
Edward Durrell Stone designed EMC New Formalism Lobby

Named for President Dwight D. Eisenhower, the hospital credits its initial creation to two events in 1966 when entertainer Bob Hope was asked to lend his name to a charity golf tournament and to serve on the board of the hospital that would be built from the tournament's proceeds. The original 80 acres (32 ha) of land were donated by Bob and Dolores Hope and both helped raise private funds for the hospital's construction. Construction began in 1969; the groundbreaking ceremony was attended by President Richard Nixon, Vice President Spiro Agnew, Governor Ronald Reagan, and entertainers Bob Hope, Frank Sinatra, Bing Crosby, Gene Autry, and Lucille Ball. The main Eisenhower hospital, designed by Edward Durrell Stone, opened in November 1971, containing 289 beds. Among the early trustees were actress Martha Hyer (the wife of film producer Hal B. Wallis) and Roy W Hill.

The three original medical buildings were named for local philanthropists Mr. and Mrs. Walter Probst, Mr. and Mrs. Peter Kiewit and Mrs. Hazel Wright. Philanthropists Walter and Leonore Annenberg donated funds to establish the Annenberg Center for Health Sciences. A $212.5 million, four story addition to the hospital, the Walter and Leonore Annenberg Pavilion, opened for patient care in November 2010. Lee Annenberg donated over $100 million to Campaign Eisenhower, Phase II. Other institutions on the campus include the Barbara Sinatra Children's Center and the Dolores Hope Outpatient Care Center. Dolores Hope served in the capacities of president, chairman of the board and chairman emeritus since 1968 and participated in every major decision regarding the hospital until her death in 2011.

By 1990, the hospital's 3000th open heart surgical procedure was performed. In 2019, the hospital was recognized as one of the top five in the Riverside County-San Bernardino metro area.

Figures from the entertainment industry have been involved with fundraising for the hospital during its history; as the area is home to many from the entertainment industry, those notable figures have also received care at the hospital. In January 2006 President Gerald Ford was admitted to EMC for sixteen days for treatment of pneumonia. Upon Ford's death on December 26, 2006, his body was taken to Eisenhower Medical Center, where his wife, Betty Ford, died in 2011.

== Teaching Hospital ==
Eisenhower Health opened the medical center in 1971 and over the decades has steadily grown and added services, capabilities and facilities to anticipate and meet the needs of the expanding desert region. Today, the Eisenhower name extends far beyond state-of-the-art care with a family birthing center, achieving designation as a Level IV Trauma center, and advancing clinical trials in regenerative medicine delivery.

Eisenhower Health is now a 437-bed hospital with 93 outpatient clinics. As a non-profit teaching hospital Eisenhower Health serves the community with approximately 25,000 inpatient visits annually, 100,000 emergency department visits, and 1,000,000 outpatient clinic visits for comprehensive care across numerous service lines. In 2010, Eisenhower Health developed an ACGME accredited Graduate Medical Education (GME) program with specialties in Family Medicine, Internal Medicine, Emergency Medicine as well as Sports Medicine, Pulmonary Medicine, Addiction Medicine, Infectious Disease, and Geriatric Medicine Fellowship Programs and medical school clerkships. These programs are an integral part of Eisenhower’s mission to foster the next generation of physicians and medical leaders.

With primary care, urgent care centers, multi-specialty health centers, and specialized programs Eisenhower has comprehensive health care support from education and prevention to diagnosis, treatment and rehabilitation. Eisenhower Health provides customized care in Men‘s Health, Women’s Health, LGBTQ+ services, and HIV care. Eisenhower was recognized as Leapfrog 2023 Top Teaching Hospital as achieving the standard in health care equity. Eisenhower's purpose is to provide advanced health care, individualized service, and deliver an exceptional patient experience.
