= Anne T. Hill =

American fashion designer and yoga teacher

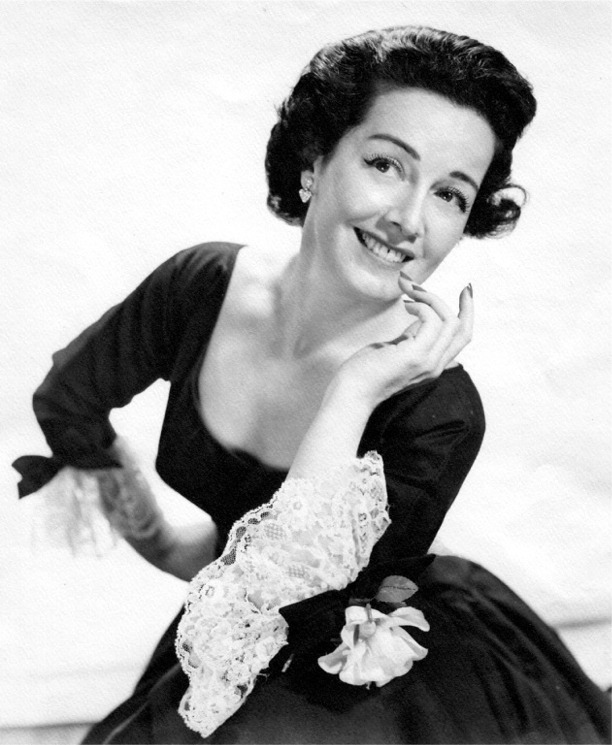
- Born: November 24, 1916; Atlanta, Georgia, U.S.
- Died: March 8, 1999 (aged 82); Rancho Mirage, California, U.S.
- Occupations: Fashion designer, yoga teacher
- Known for: Taffy Fashions
- Spouses: Dr. Harry Lehrer; Roy W. Hill (m. 1971; died 1986) Edgar L. McCoubrey (m. 1990)

Anne T. Hill (née Taffel; November 24, 1916 – March 8, 1999) was an American fashion designer and yoga teacher.

== Early years ==
Hill was born in Atlanta, Georgia. She graduated from Commercial High School in 1933, attended the University of Georgia, and worked as a stenographer before moving to Los Angeles in 1937.

== Taffy Fashions ==
Hill designed dresses, predominantly cotton, for her own line, Taffy, from 1937 until March 1958. As women's fashions took up a larger budget slice, the popularity of her dresses grew. They were featured as "outstanding" in a Palm Springs Tennis Club fashion luncheon in 1948. Vogue and Harper's Bazaar carried full page ads for Taffy fashions during the 1950s, and covered Taffy fashions editorially. "There is nothing so feminine and romantic as a full skirt, pretty, with petticoats underneath," Hill told Women's Wear Daily. "The very feminine dresses almost all have bouffant skirts built over their own petticoats," wrote Eugenia Trinkle, fashion writer for the Star Telegram. Bergdorf Goodman, Garfinckel's, and Jacobson's carried Taffy fashions.

== Health and yoga ==
Through an acquaintance with Gypsy Boots, Hill became interested in health food and yoga. She studied yoga with Indra Devi, and produced her own yoga instructional video, as well as an inspirational poem.

== Death ==
Hill died in Rancho Mirage, California, in 1999.

== Gallery ==
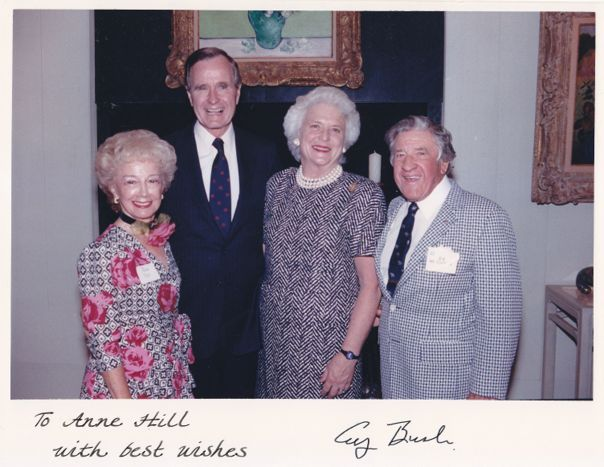
Hill, Edgar L. McCoubrey, George H. W. Bush and Barbara Bush

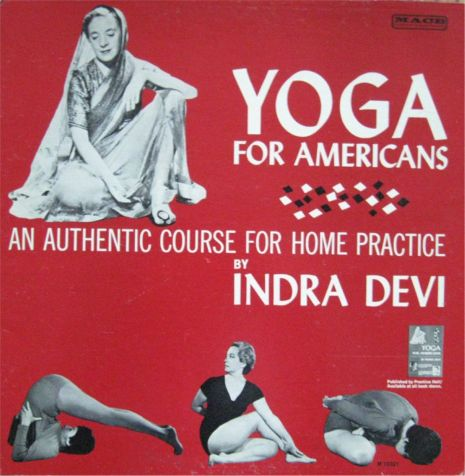
Indra Devi, upper left; Hill, bottom center (record album cover)

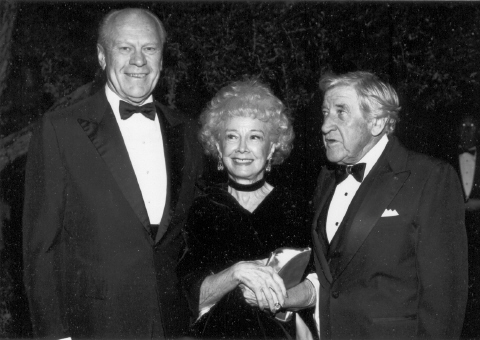
Gerald Ford, Hill and Edgar L. McCoubrey

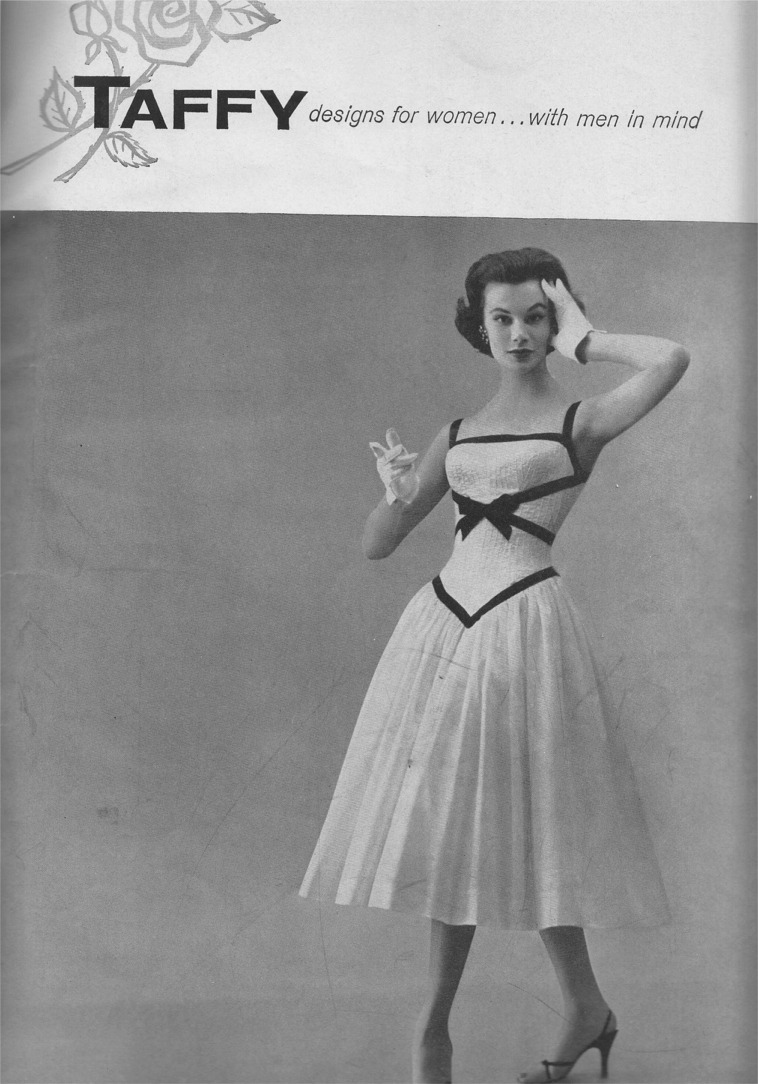
Taffy in Vogue, April 15, 1956, p 29

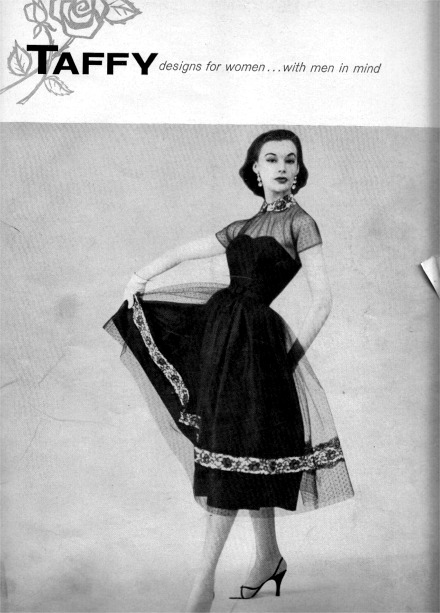
Taffy in Harper's Bazaar, August 1956 p 87

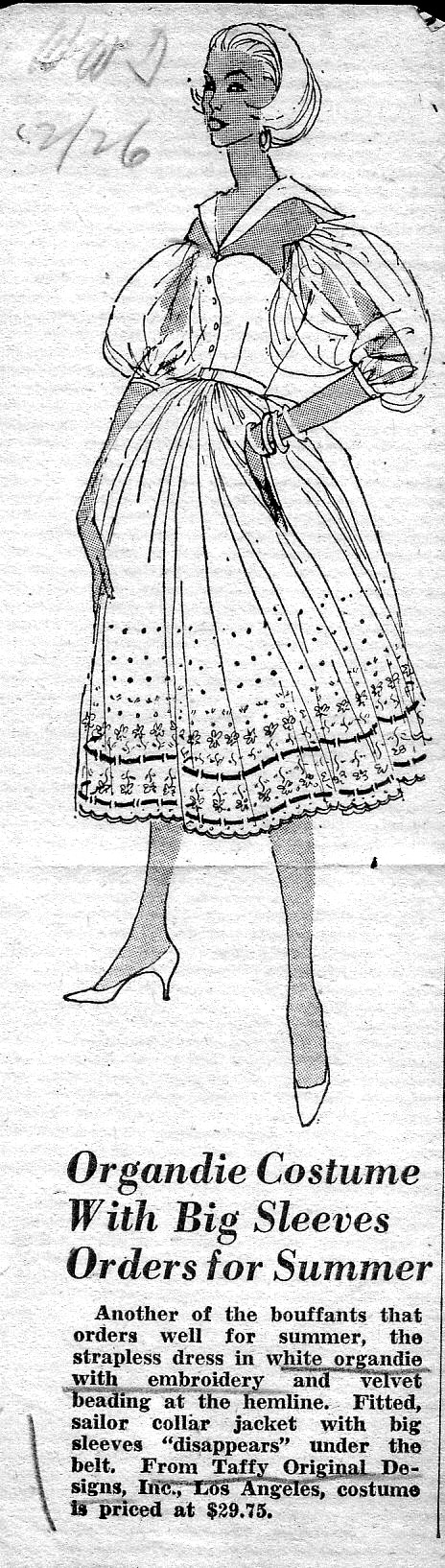
Taffy in Women's Wear Daily, 26 Feb 1956

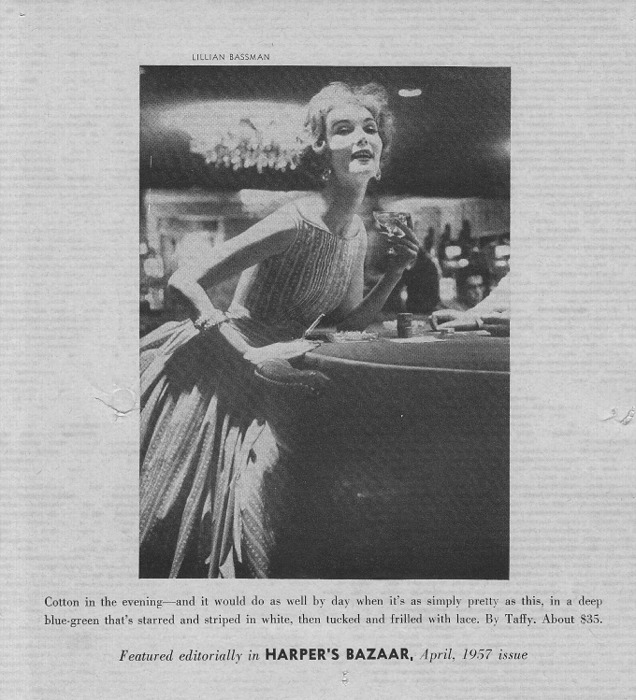
Taffy in Harper's Bazaar, April 1957

Taffy at Bergdorf Goodman 1956

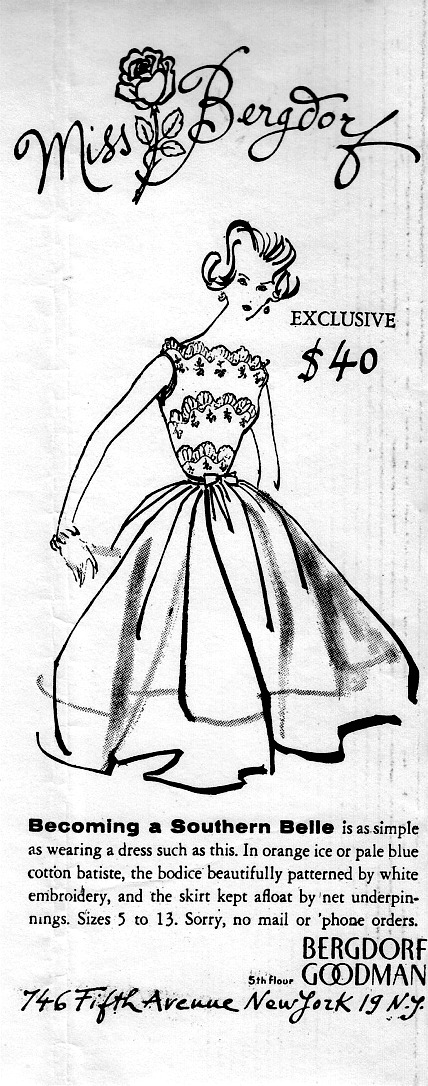
Taffy at Bergdorf Goodman 1956

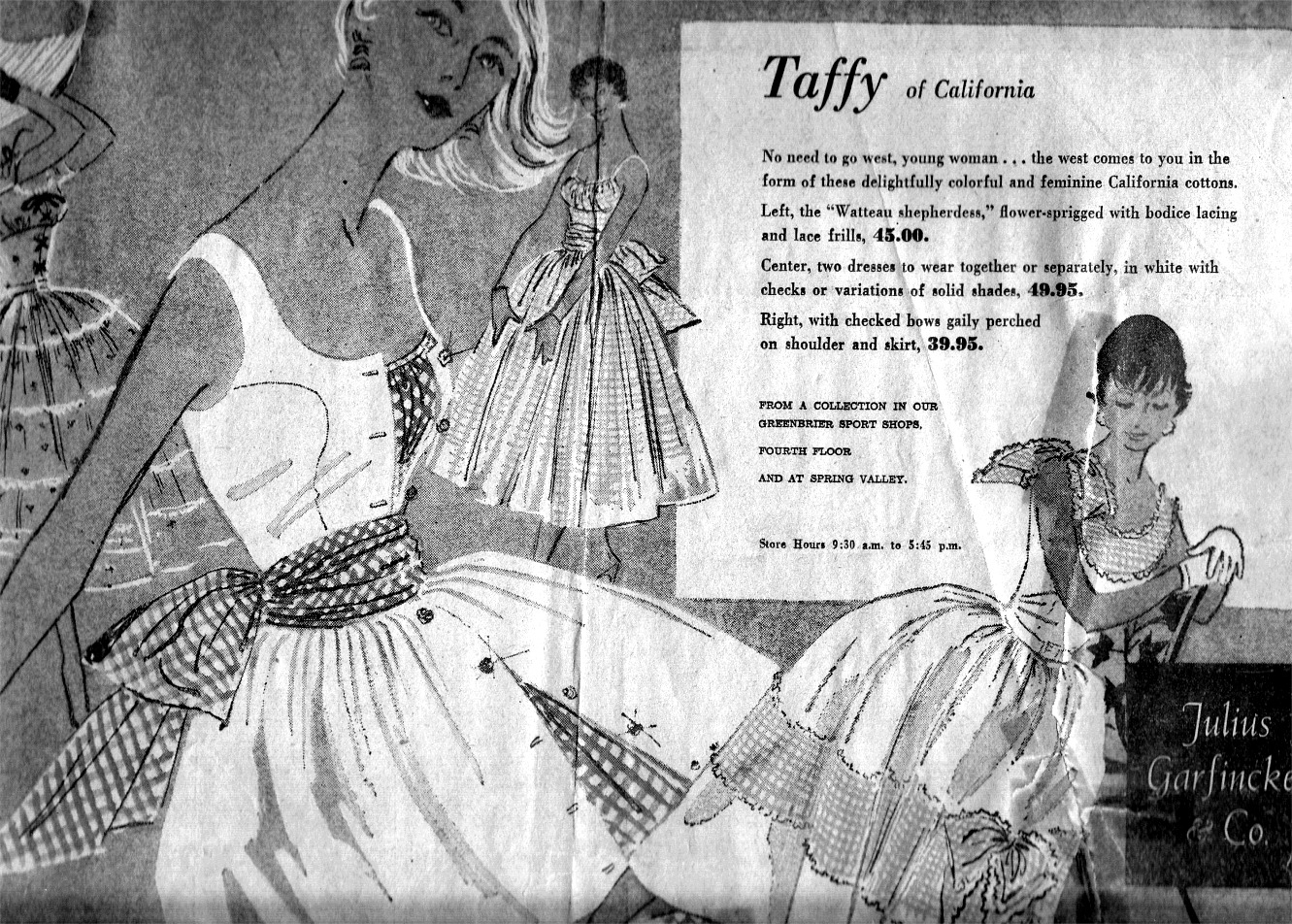
Taffy at Garfinckel's c. 1956

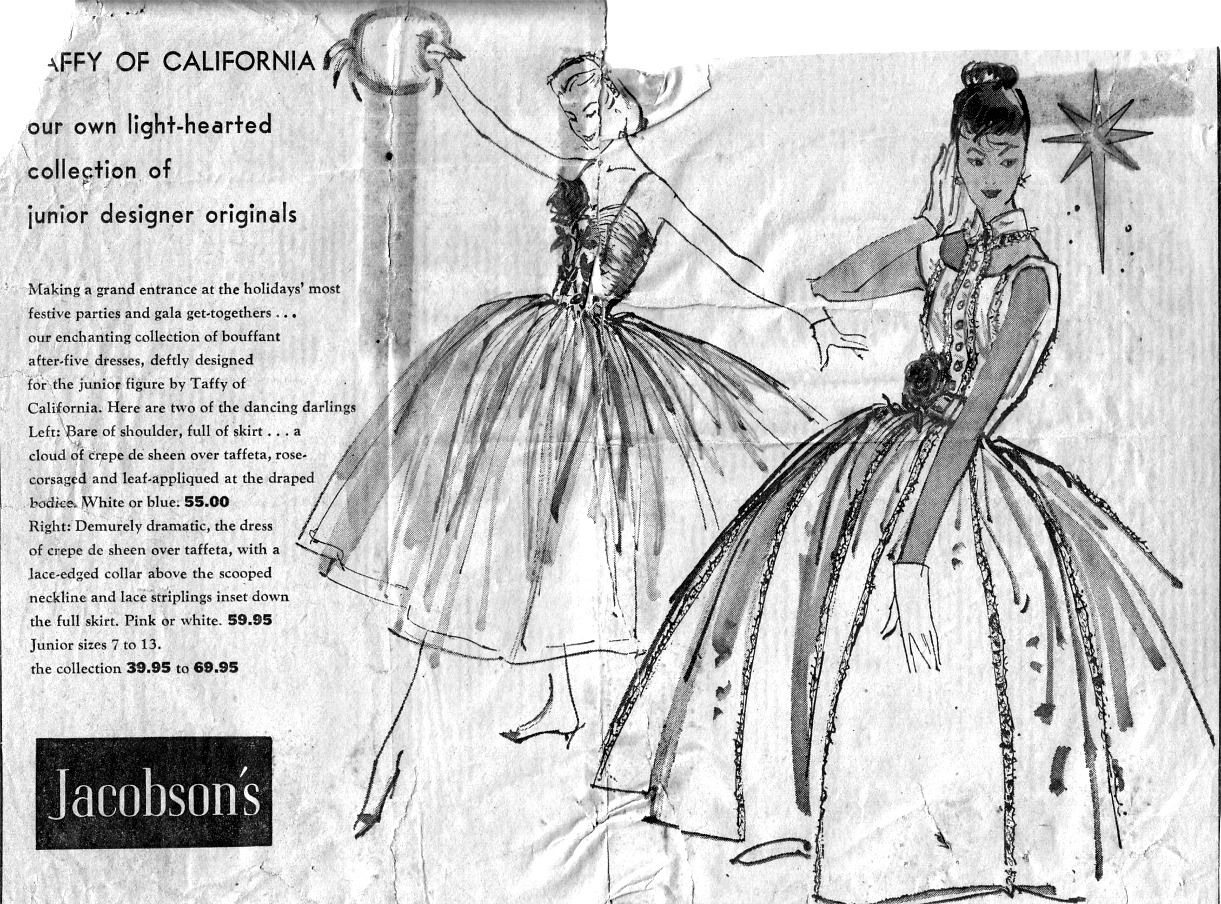
Taffy at Jacobson's c. 1956

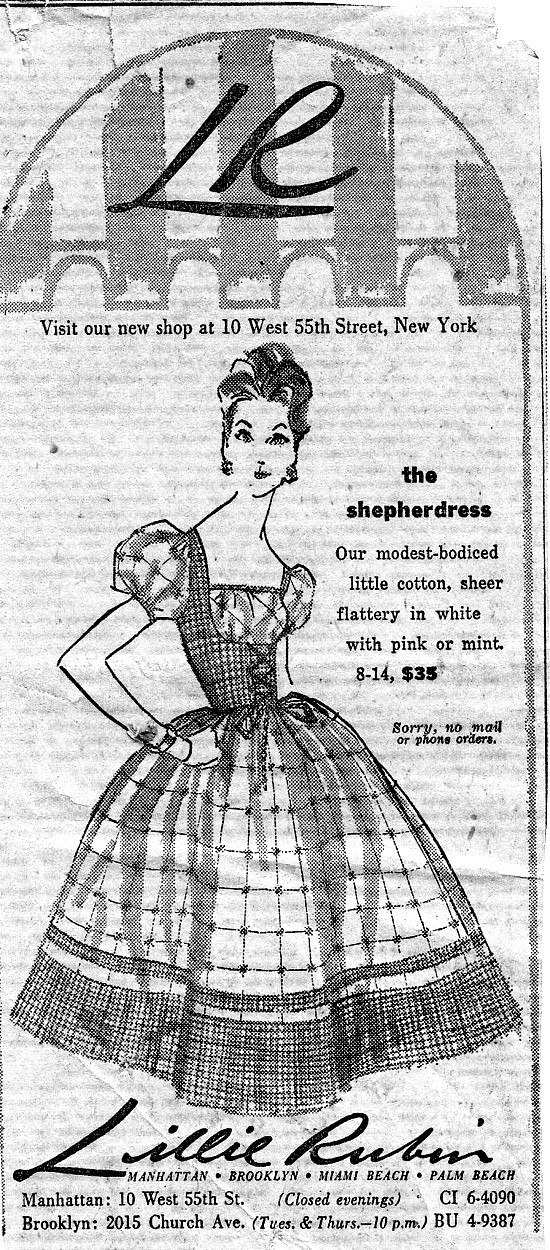
Taffy at Lillie Rubin c. 1956

Taffy in Berkeley 1956

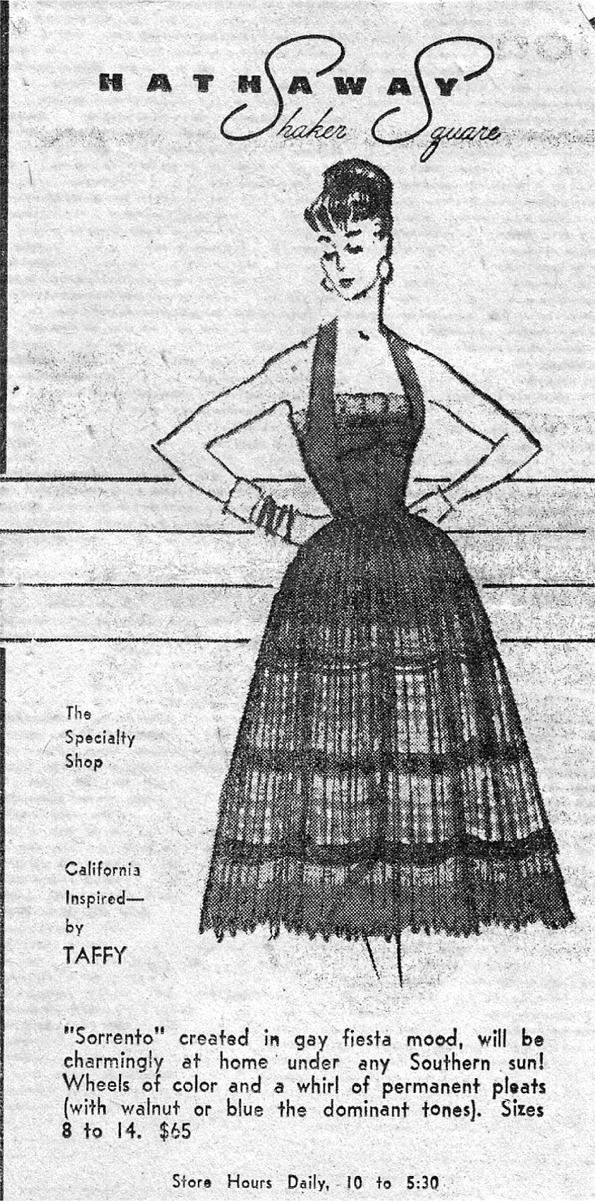
Taffy in Cleveland 1956

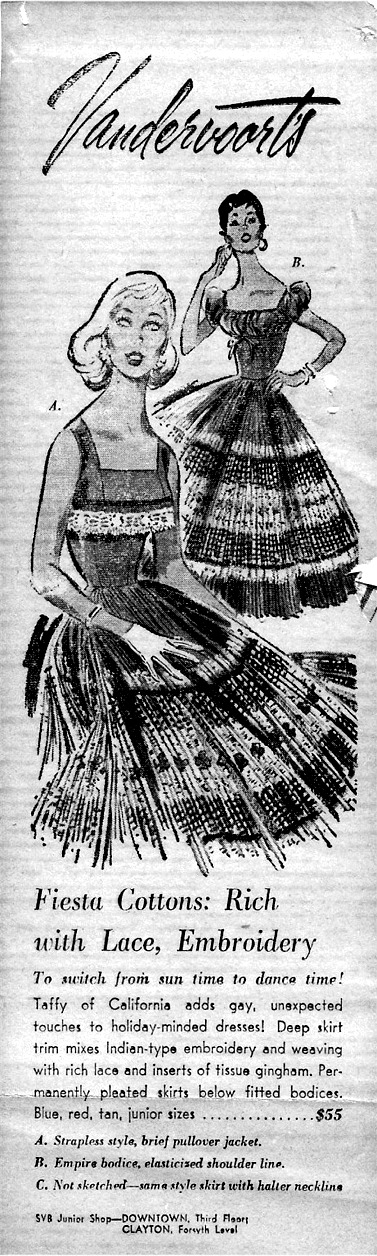
Taffy in St Louis 1956

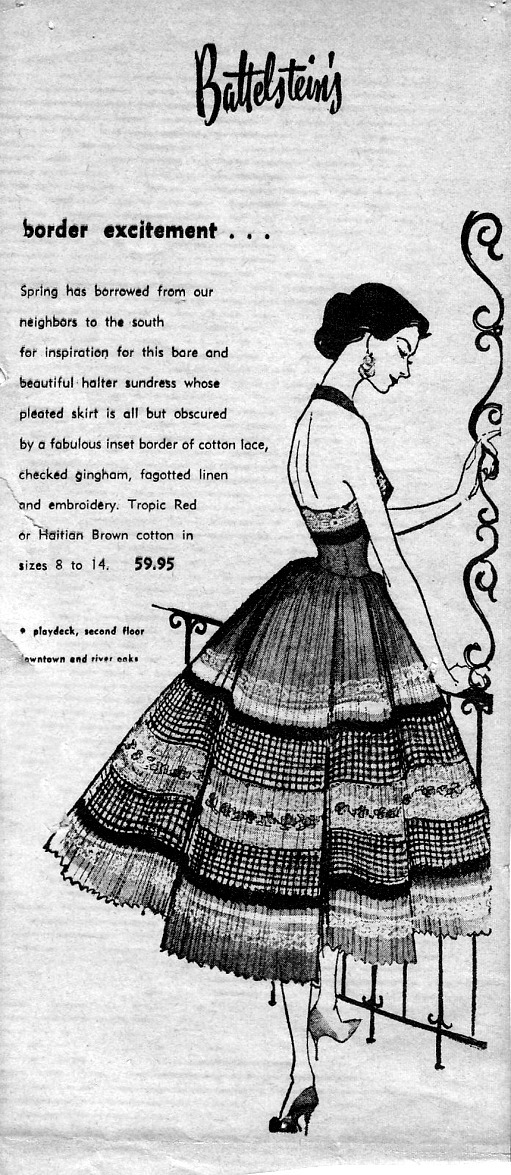
Taffy in Houston 1956

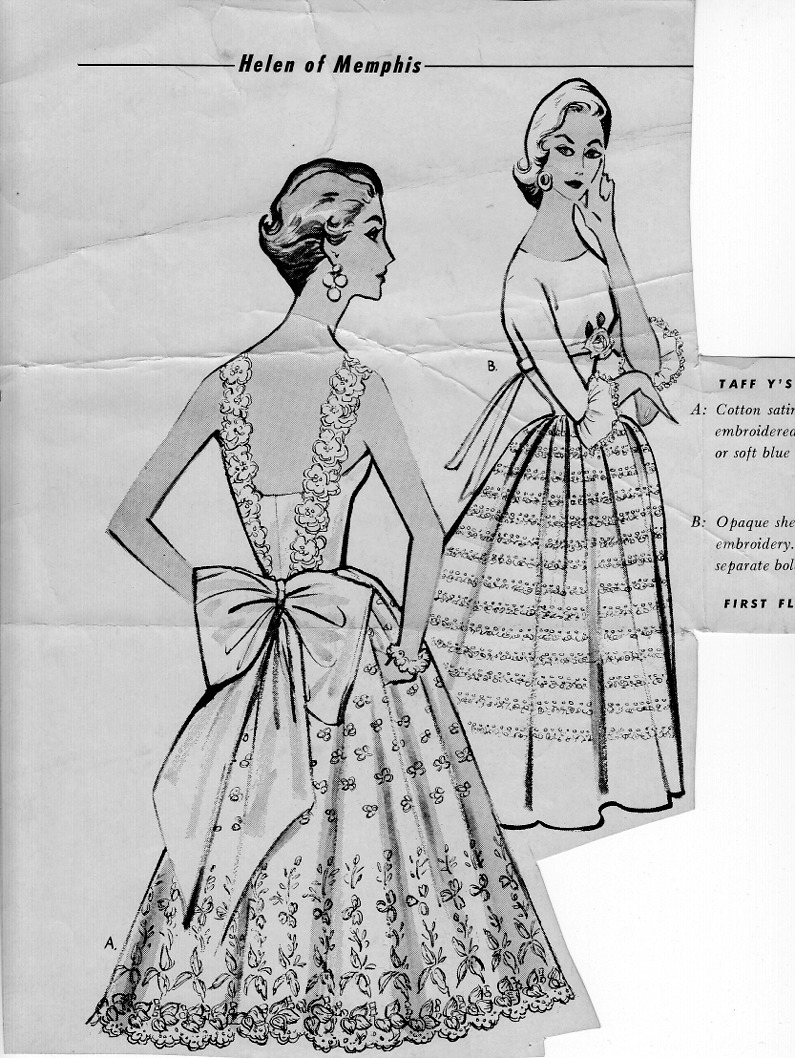
Taffy in Memphis 1956

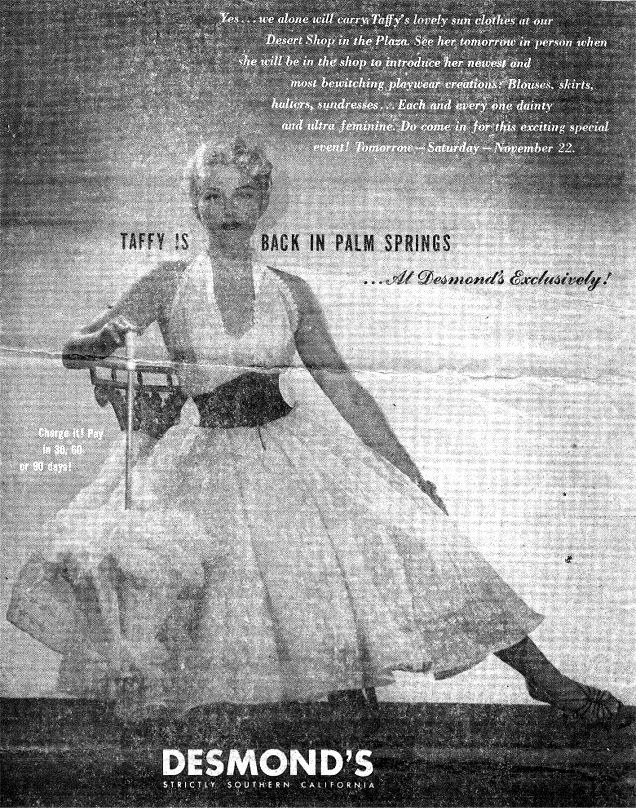
Taffy in Palm Springs 1956

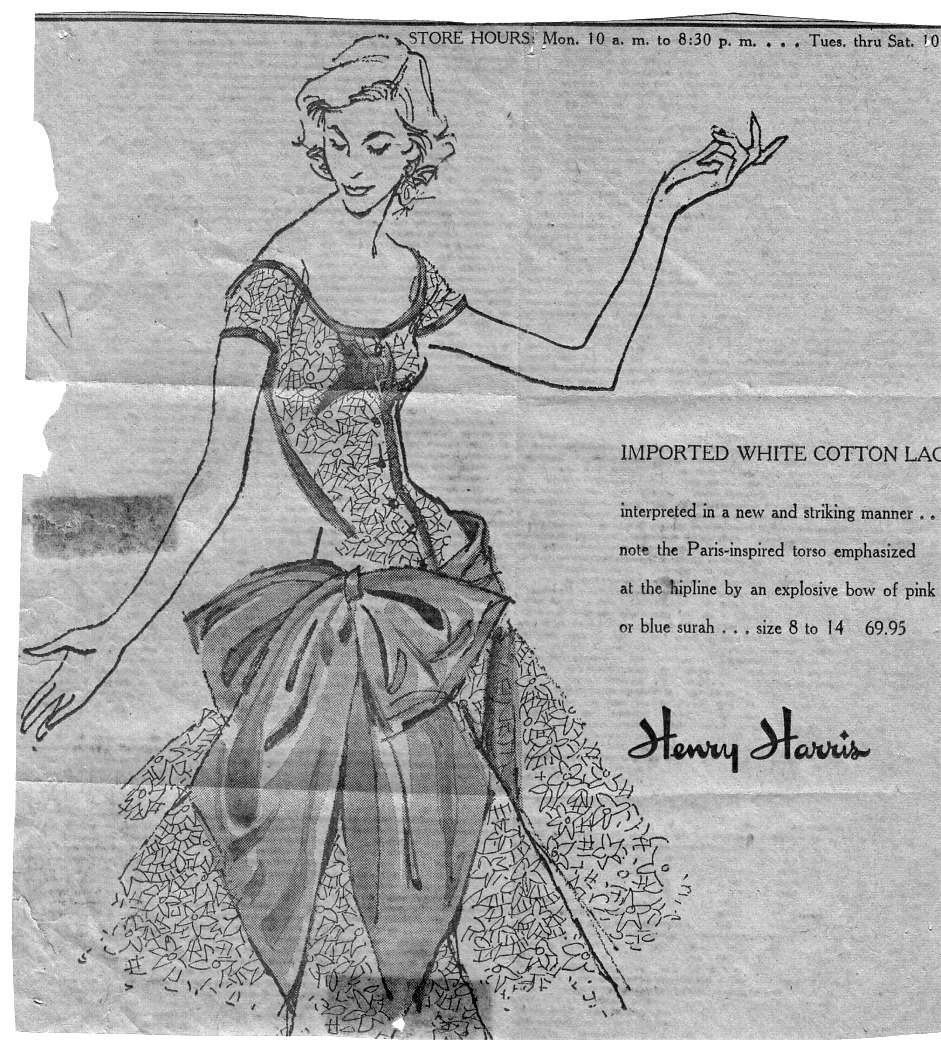
Taffy in Cincinnati 1956

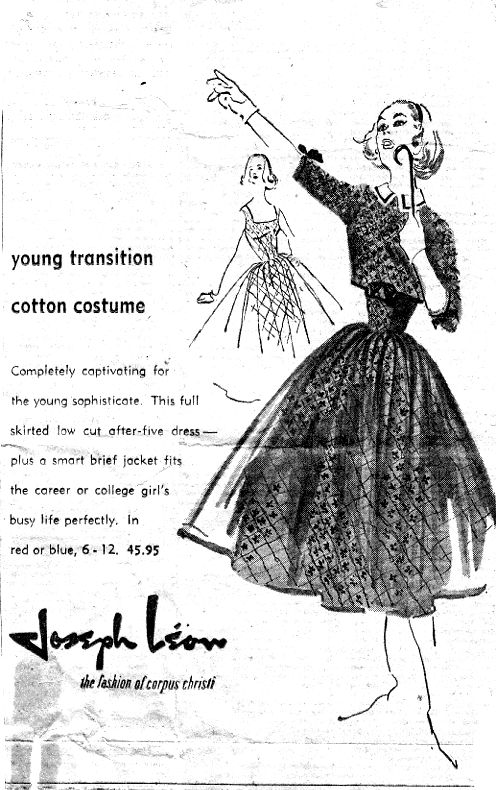
Taffy in Corpus Christi 1956

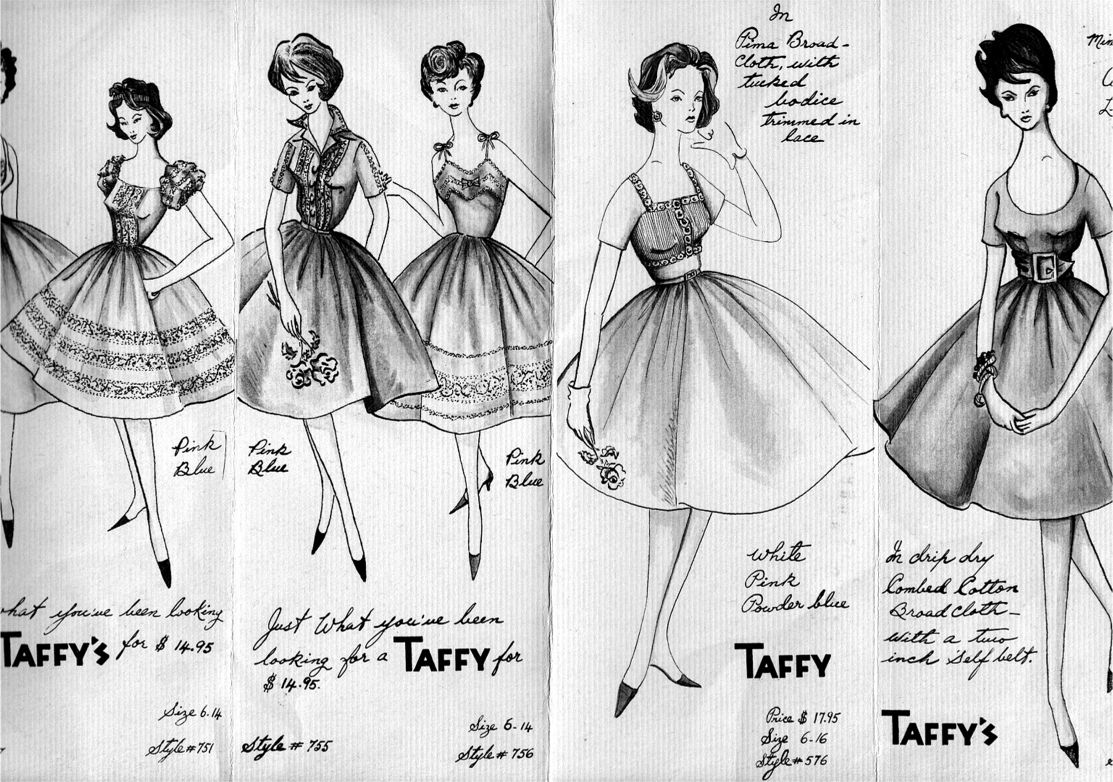
Taffy promotional flyer 1956

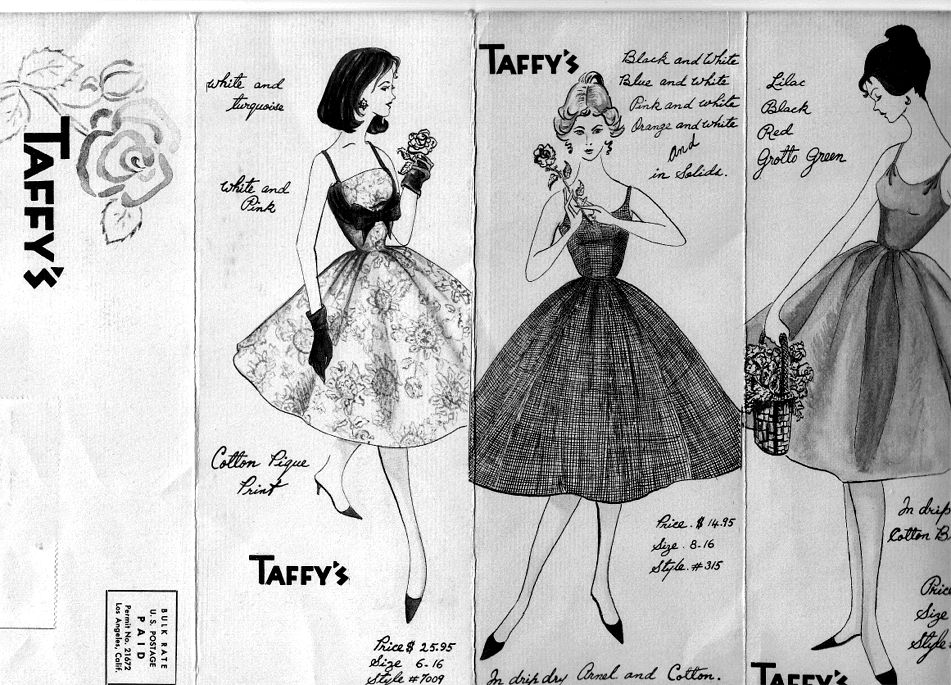
Taffy promotional flyer 1956

Taffy in New York 1957

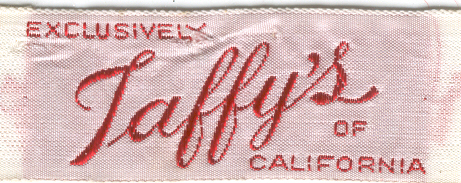
Taffy label

(left to right) Alex Dreier, Bob Hope, Hill, Geraldine Dreier, Roy W. Hill at a fund raiser for Eisenhower Medical Center c. 1975

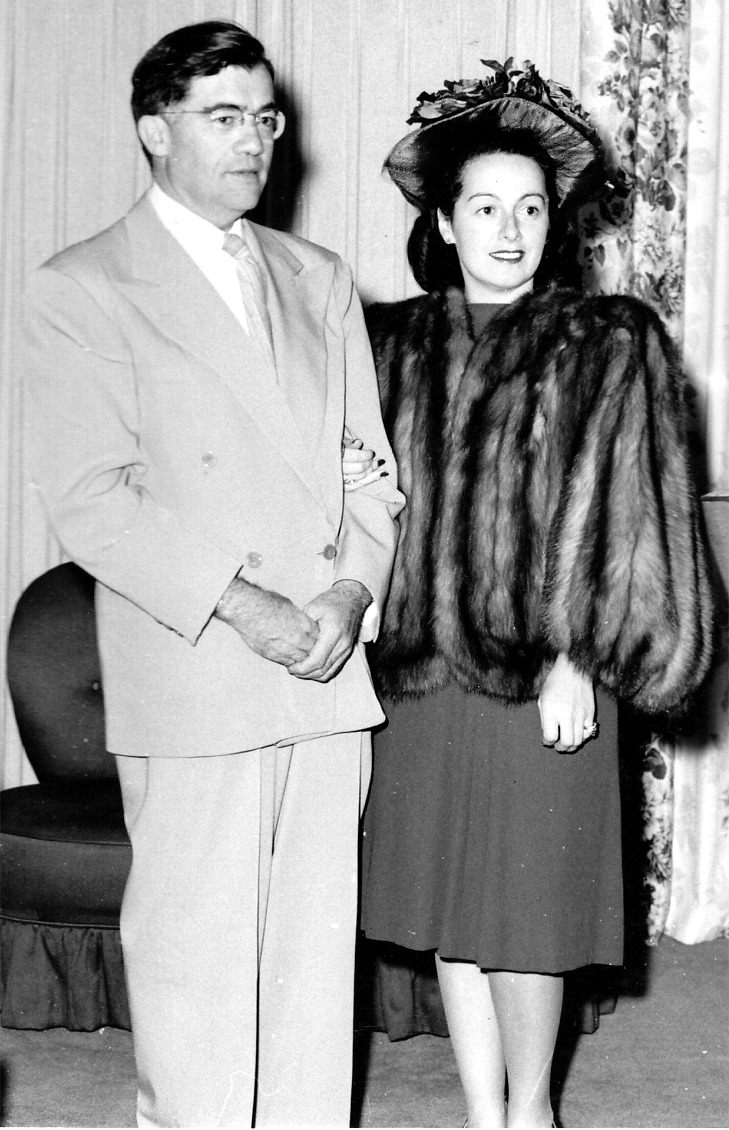
Hill and Dr. Harry Lehrer, c. 1940

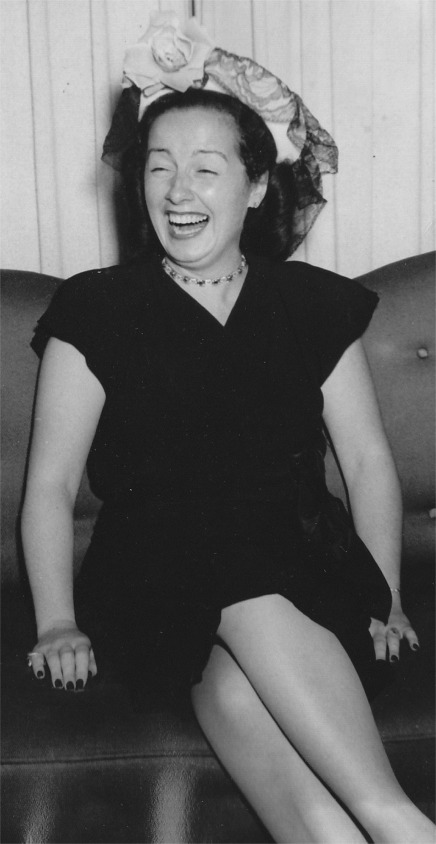
Hill, c. 1947

Lynne Roberts (left), Hill (3rd from left), Hyman B. Samuels (front right), Dr. Harry Lehrer (extreme right behind Samuels)

Hill, Edgar L. McCoubrey, 1991

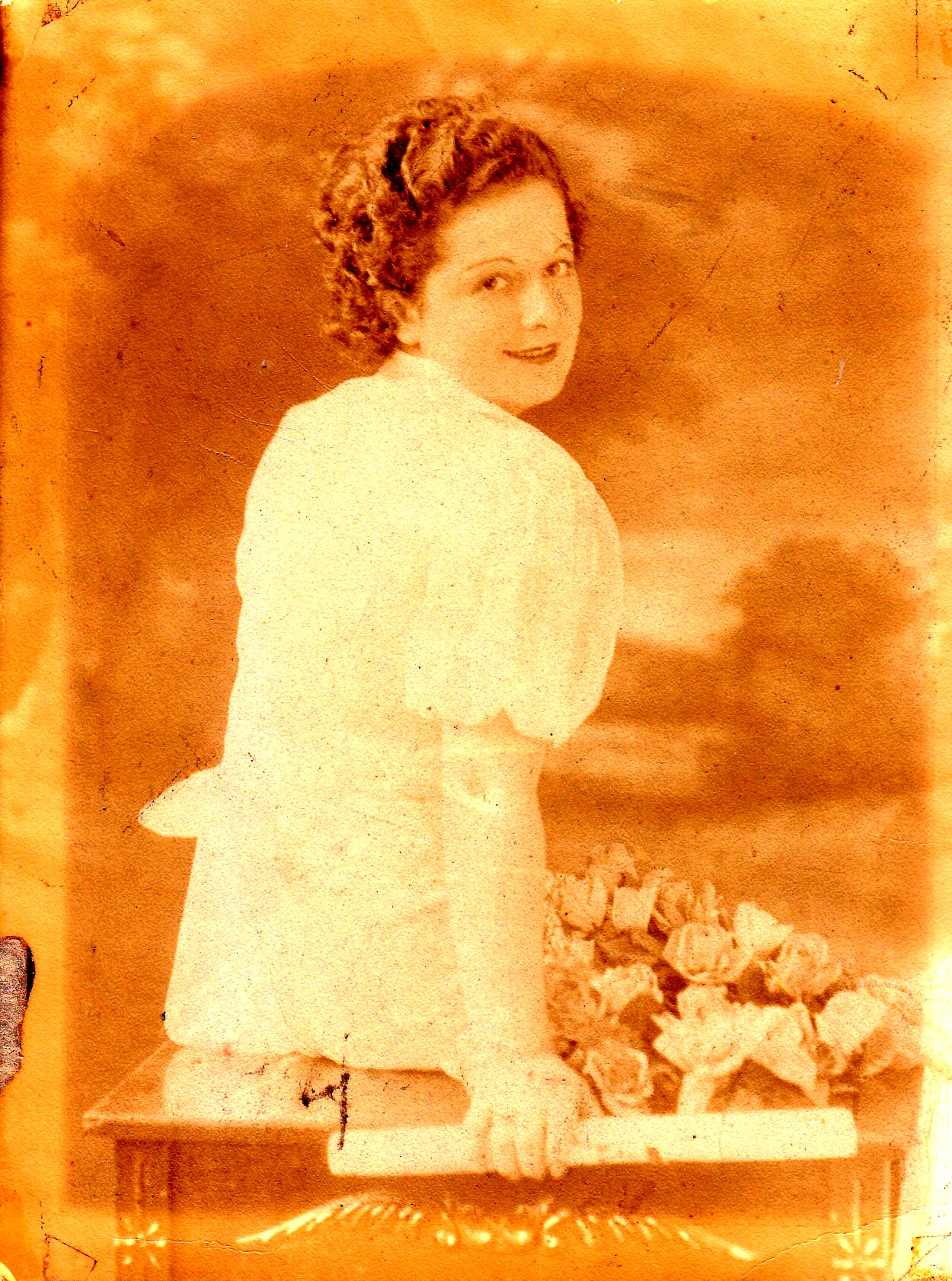
Anne T. Hill, 1933 graduation, Commercial High School, Atlanta
