= Yoshi Kasuya =

Japanese educator

Yoshi Kasuya (1894–1994) was a Japanese educator who spent the majority of her career at Tsuda College in Kodaira, Tokyo, initially as a teacher and later as president. She studied extensively in the United States, receiving a B.A. from Wellesley College in 1923 and an M.A. and PhD from Columbia University in 1930 and 1933 respectively. She received the Blue Ribbon Medal and was made a member of the Third Class of the Order of the Precious Crown for her contributions to women's education.

== Biography ==
Kasuya attended Miwada Girls' High School, a Tokyo private school founded in 1902. She became a teacher at Tsuda College, a private university for women founded by Tsuda Umeko, in 1915. She would spend most of her career at Tsuda College with intermittent periods of overseas study. Kasuya traveled to the United States in 1919 to attend Wellesley College, a private women's university in Massachusetts. She returned to Japan a week after the 1923 Great Kantō earthquake and resumed teaching at Tsuda College.

Kasuya went back to the United States in 1929, this time to complete a master's degree at Columbia University Teachers College, which she received in 1930. Supervised by Isaac Leon Kandel and Willystine Goodsell, she then began a PhD at Columbia, completing her doctorate in 1933. As part of her doctoral studies, she spent two months in Germany, enrolling at the University of Berlin and visiting 40 educational institutions in 20 German cities. Her thesis, A Comparative Study of the Secondary Education of Girls in England, Germany, and the United States with a Consideration of the Secondary Education of Girls in Japan (1933) explored the transnational and gendered aspects of education and was based on her interviews with and observations of educators in England, Germany and the United States. Back in Japan, she taught for eight years at Utsunomiya Junior College.

Kasuya returned to Wellesley College in 1950 to study university education and language teaching in girls' high schools; this would be her last trip to the United States. She later became president of Tsuda College and retired in 1962. She was awarded a Blue Ribbon Medal by the Japanese government in 1960 and received the Third Class of the Order of the Precious Crown in 1968 for her contributions to women's education.
