= Anna Cope Hartshorne =

American educator (1860–1957)

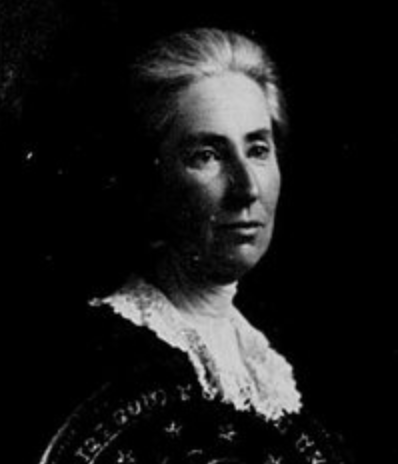
- Anna Cope Hartshorne, from her 1915 application for a U.S. passport
- Born: January 8, 1860; Germantown, Pennsylvania
- Died: October 2, 1957 (aged 97); Philadelphia, Pennsylvania
- Occupations: Educator, writer, philanthropist
- Relatives: Charles Hartshorne (cousin), Richard Hartshorne (cousin)

Anna Cope Hartshorne (January 8, 1860 – October 2, 1957) was an American educator and writer based in Japan. A member of a prominent Philadelphia Quaker family, she was a founder and faculty member of Tsuda University, with her close friend Tsuda Umeko.

== Early life and education ==
Anna Cope Hartshorne was born in Germantown, Pennsylvania, the daughter of Henry Hartshorne and Mary Elizabeth Brown Hartshorne. Philosopher Charles Hartshorne and geographer Richard Hartshorne were her cousins. Her father, a Quaker physician, was an advocate for public health and women's higher education, and a medical missionary in Japan. She attended Bryn Mawr College, where she and Tsuda Umeko became friends.

== Career ==
Hartshorne taught English literature at the Friends' School in Tokyo in the 1890s. She helped raise funds to open the Joshi Eigaku Juku (Women's Institute of English Studies) in 1900, which was forerunner of Tsuda University. She taught at the Tsuda school from 1902 until 1940, as a volunteer. When the 1923 Great Kantō earthquake destroyed the school's campus, she toured in the United States to raise money to rebuild it, and oversaw the rebuilding after Tsuda Umeko's death in 1930. In 1931 she made another tour in the United States, to thank donors, raise more funds, and report on the school's progress. She reported on the school's reopening on another visit to the United States in 1937.

Hartshorne wrote Japan and Her People (1902, 2 vol.) and A Reading Journey Through Japan (1904). She also designed the American cover of Nitobe Inazō's Bushido: The Soul of Japan (1900).

== Personal life ==
Hartshorne left Japan in 1940, possibly intending to return, but World War II made her return to the United States permanent. She died in Philadelphia in 1957, aged 97 years. The main hall at Tsuda University is named for Hartshorne. Her papers are with her father's and grandfather's papers, in the Haverford College library.
