= Shunji Shimizu =

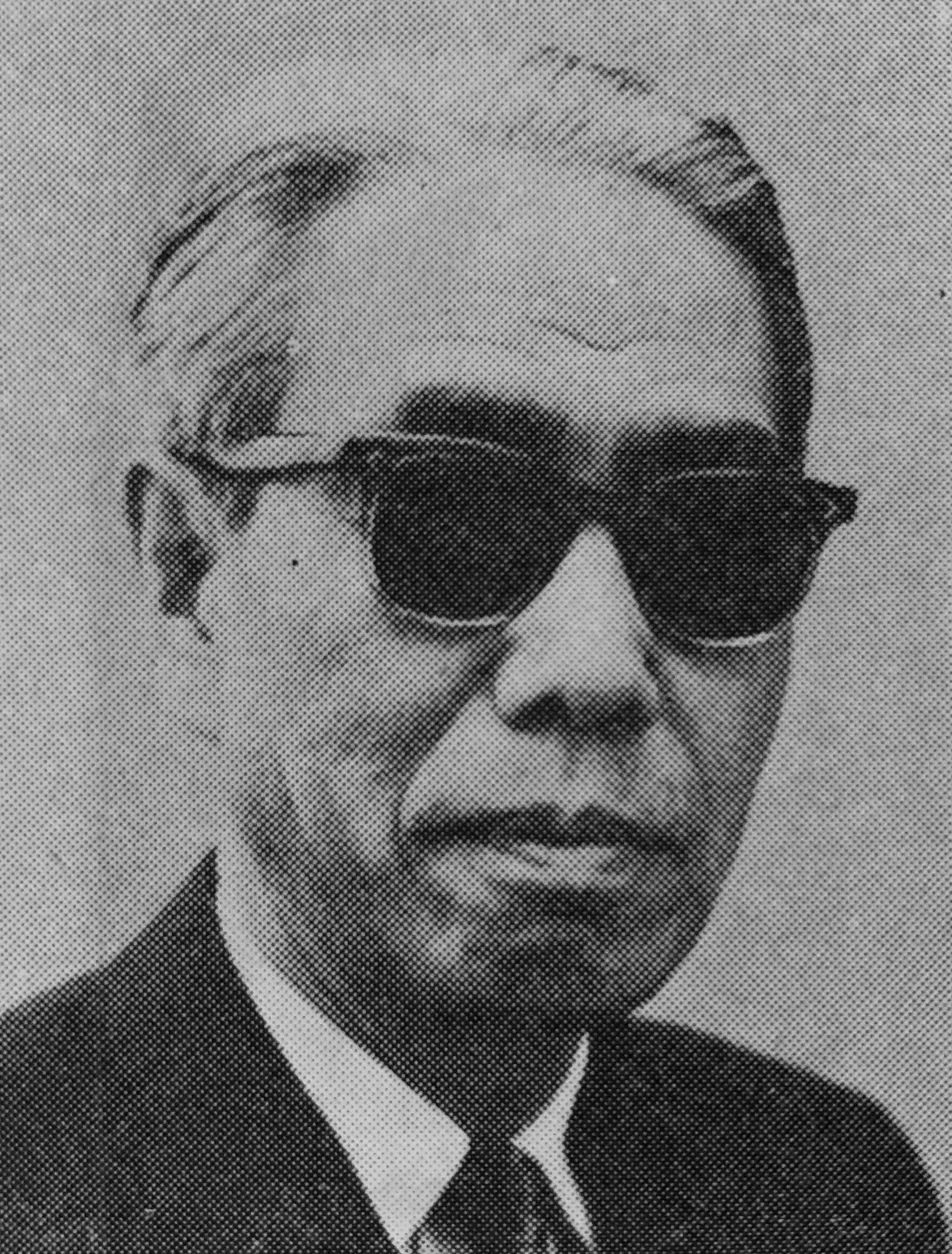
Shunji in 1964

Shunji Shimizu (清水俊二 Shimizu Shunji^{?}), (1906-1988), is a well-known Japanese subtitler and translator, referred to by one scholar as 'practically a household name in Japan'. He translated popular authors including Erskine Caldwell and Agatha Christie. He had a long working relationship with the Hollywood studio Paramount Pictures. He was a mentor to the eminent subtitler Natsuko Toda.

== Career ==
Shunji Shimizu is said to have inaugurated film subtitling proper in Japan. The first subtitled film in Japan was Josef von Sternberg's 1930 film Morocco. It came out in Japan in 1931 and was subtitled by Yukihiko Tamura. The film's success was so great that Paramount decided greatly to expand its distribution of films to Japan, but Tamura was not able to leave Japan. He introduced Shunji Shimizu to Paramount Pictures, which whom he went on to have a long working relationship. One scholar suggests that "Shimizu's work with Paramount marks the start of film translation proper in Japan and he is considered by many to be the first true film subtitling craftsman [...]".

He was Paramount's subtitler for the Japanese market, with responsibility for preparing Paramount newsreels for distribution in Japan in the late 1930s and early 1940s, until American films were banned in Japan. He published extensively on the art and practice of subtitling. He was at one point a representative of the Japanese Administrating Commission of Motion Picture Code of Ethics. He acted as a mentor to the later very well-known subtitler Natsuko Toda, and also taught translation to the sf editor, writer and translator Masami Fukushima.

== Films subtitled by Shunji Shimizu ==
1. Working Girl (1931)
2. The Last Parade (1932)
3. The Criminal Code (1932)
4. 24 Hours (1932)
5. Ladies of Leisure (1932)
6. Girls About Town (1932)
7. The Beloved Bachelor (1932)
8. Caught (1932)
9. Two Kinds of Women (1932)
10. This Reckless Age (1932)
11. Strangers in Love (1932)
12. Wayward (1932)
13. The Lights of Buenos Aires (1932)
14. Fifty Fathoms Deep (1932)
15. This is the Night (1932)
16. The Broken Wing (1932)
17. Million Dollar Legs (1932 film)
18. Sky Bride (1932)
19. The Misleading Lady (1932)
20. The Strange Case of Clara Deane (1932)
21. Make Me a Star (1932)
22. Sinners in the Sun (1932)
23. Devil and the Deep (1932)
24. The Miracle Woman (1932)
25. Subway Express (1932)
26. Guilty as Hell (1932)
27. Ten Cents a Dance (1932)
28. Thunder Below (1932)
29. The Night of June 13 (1932)
30. No One Man (1932)
31. Madison Square Garden (1933)
32. Street Scene (film) (1933)
33. The Big Broadcast (1933)
34. If I Had a Million (1933)
35. Palmy Days (1933)
36. The Phamtom President (1933)
37. Night After Night (1933)
38. Evenings for Sale (1933)
39. He Learned About Women (1933)
40. Corsair (1933)
41. Island of Lost Souls (1933)
42. Under-Cover Man (1933)
43. Wild Horse Mesa (1933)
44. The Vanishing Frontier (1933)
45. The Devil is Driving (1933)
46. American Madness (1933)
47. Forbidden (1933)
48. Hot Saturday (1933)
49. Hello, Everybody!(1933)
50. The Billion Dollar Scandal (1933)
51. From Hell to Heaven (1933)
52. Murders in the Zoo (1933)
53. White Zombie (1933)
54. Luxury Liner (1933)
55. Reserved for Ladies (1933)
56. Terror Abroad (1933)
57. Heritage of the Desert (1933)
58. The Story of Temple Drake (1933)
59. Strictly Personal (1933)
60. The Greeks had a Word for Then (1933)
61. Song of the Eagle (1933)
62. The Age for Love (1933)
63. Rain (1932 film) (1933)
64. The Girl in 419 (1933)
65. College Humor (1933)
66. I Love That Man (1933)
67. The Eagle and the Hawk (1933)
68. Supernatural (1933)
69. Washington Merry-Go-Round (1933)
70. The Night Club Lady (1933)
71. International House (1933)
72. This Day and Age (1933)
73. I Cover the Waterfront (1933)
74. Brothers (1933)
75. Mama Loves Papa (1933)
76. Disgraced! (1933)
77. Platinum Blonde (1933)
78. Gambling Ship (1933)
79. Three-Cornered Moon (1933)
80. Midnight Club (1933)
81. Her Bodyguard (1933)
82. Under the Tonto Rim (1933)
83. One Sunday Afternoon (1933)
84. Air Hostess (1933)

== Filmography ==
1. Teahouse of the August Moon (Daniel Mann, 1956)
2. Othello (Laurence Olivier, 1965)
3. Conrack (Martin Ritt, 1974)
4. Virus (Kinji Fukasaku, 1980)

== Selected works ==
1. Eiga Jimaku no Gojunen (Tokyo: Hayakawa Shobo, 1985).
2. Eiga Jimaku no Tsukurikata Oshiemasu (Tokyo, Bunshun Bunko, 1988)
3. Eiga Jimaku wa Honyaku de wa Nai, ed. Natsuko Toda and Tamako Ueno (Tokyo: Hayakawa Shobo, 1992)
