= Tsuda University =

Women's university, Kodaira, Tokyo

- 津田塾大学
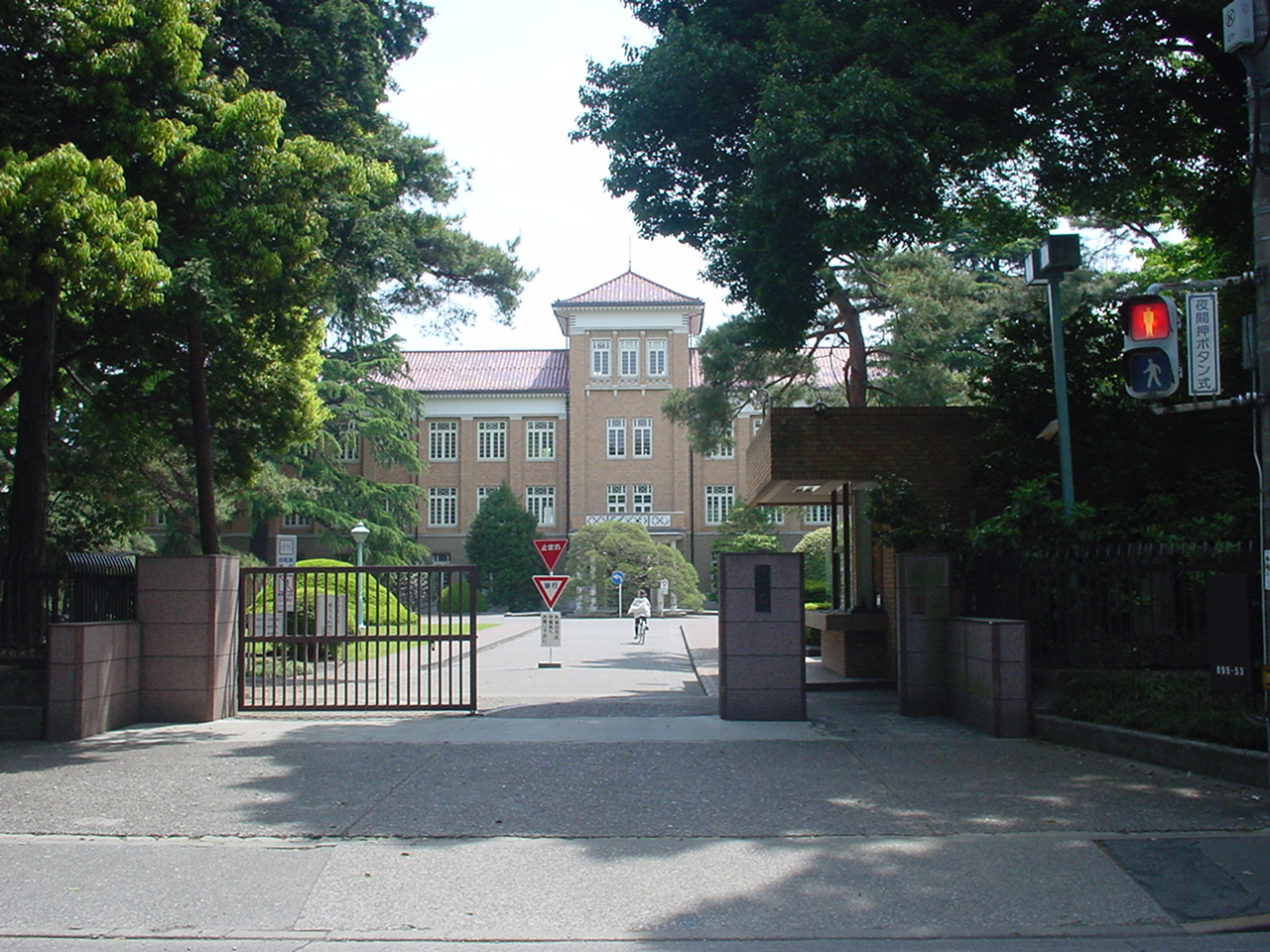
- Former names: Joshi Eigaku Juku, Tsuda Eigaku Juku, Tsuda Juku Senmon Gakko, Tsuda College
- Type: Private women's university
- Founders: Tsuda Umeko
- Location: Kodaira, Tokyo, Japan; 35°43′21″N 139°27′59″E
- Campus: Urban
- Language: Japanese, English
- Website: www.tsuda.ac.jp

Tsuda University (津田塾大学, Tsudajuku daigaku) is a private women's university based at Kodaira, Tokyo. It is one of the oldest and most prestigious higher educational institutions for women in Japan, contributing to the advancement of women in society for more than a century.

== History ==
The university was founded in 1900 by Tsuda Umeko as Joshi Eigaku Juku. The name was changed to Tsuda Eigaku Juku in 1933, then to Tsuda Juku Senmon Gakko, and finally Tsuda Juku Daigaku (Tsuda College) in 1948.

From April 2017 Tsuda was renamed, in English, to Tsuda University consisting of two colleges:

- The College of Liberal Arts at Kodaira Campus, Tokyo
- The College of Policy Studies at Sendagaya Campus, Tokyo

== Notable alumnae ==
- Taki Fujita, 4th president of Tsuda College (1962–1972)
- Kumiko Haba, political scientist, international relations
- Michiko Inukai, author
- Ichiko Kamichika, politician
- Mieko Kamiya, psychiatrist
- Mitsuyo Kusano, newscaster
- Yoriko Madoka, politician
- Yoko Matsuoka McClain, Japanese language and literature professor
- Chie Nakane, first-appointed female professor of Tokyo University
- Tomoko Namba, founder and former CEO of DeNA Co., Ltd.
- Emiko Ohnuki-Tierney, anthropologist
- Natsuko Toda, translator
- Akiko Yamanaka, politician
- Noriko Yui, mathematician
- Sachiko Hayashi, visual artist

List of Notable Alumnae

== Faculty ==
- Anna Cope Hartshorne
- Yoshi Kasuya
- Julie Beth Lovins
- Kawai Michi
- Tsuda Umeko
- Elizabeth Gray Vining
- Tetsuro Watsuji
