= Yoshiko Miya =

Japanese journalist (1945–2015)

- 宮淑子
- Born: 18 February 1945; Empire of Japan
- Died: 4 April 2015 (aged 70)
- Education: Aoyama Gakuin University; Hosei University
- Occupations: journalist, writer, social critic

Yoshiko Miya (Japanese: 宮淑子, romanized: Miya Yoshiko; 18 February 1945 – 4 April 2015) was a Japanese freelance writer and journalist, social critic and feminist. She published one of the first books about sexual violence experienced by Japanese women and the impact of recently implemented laws in 1984.

== Biography ==
Yoshiko was born in 1945. She studied English and American literature at the Aoyama Gakuin University in Shibuya, Tokyo, and sociology at Hosei University in Tokyo.

As a freelance writer, she wrote articles for the newspaper Mainichi Shimbun. Yoshiko's writing covered topics including female sexuality, the Japanese cultural construction of gender, the distinction between gender and sexuality, institutional responses to the female body "in crisis", mental and physical disability, anorexia, sexual violence, harassment, shame, generational differences in the Japanese feminist movement, teenage sex and sex work. She felt that individual women's liberation was essential to the success of feminist politics in Japan.

In 1984, Yoshiko wrote one of the first books about sexual violence experienced by Japanese women and the impact of recently implemented laws. She advocated for speaking out about the taboo of domestic sexual violence, writing that "in a society where women have for so long accepted silence as the only response to rape we are beginning to recognize that rape is not something that happens out on the street, but it is located in the family. This contributes to the silence."

In 1997, she contributed a chapter to the book Broken Silence: Voices of Japanese Feminism. Her chapter explored her theory that the popularity of rorikon among male university students could be linked to the strong emotional attachment between mothers and sons and how the focus on educational achievement left them in a state of immaturity. She summarised that "the children of mazakon (mother son generation) graduate into the rorikon generation."

She also wrote about women's history, including the military "comfort women" of World War II. In 1991, she contributed a chapter to Recreating Japanese Women, 1600-1945 regarding the expectations of Japanese women to both do factory work and become mothers in the 1930s and 1940s.

She died of pancreatic cancer in 2015.
