= Kumiko Haba =

Professor of international relations

- 羽場 久美子
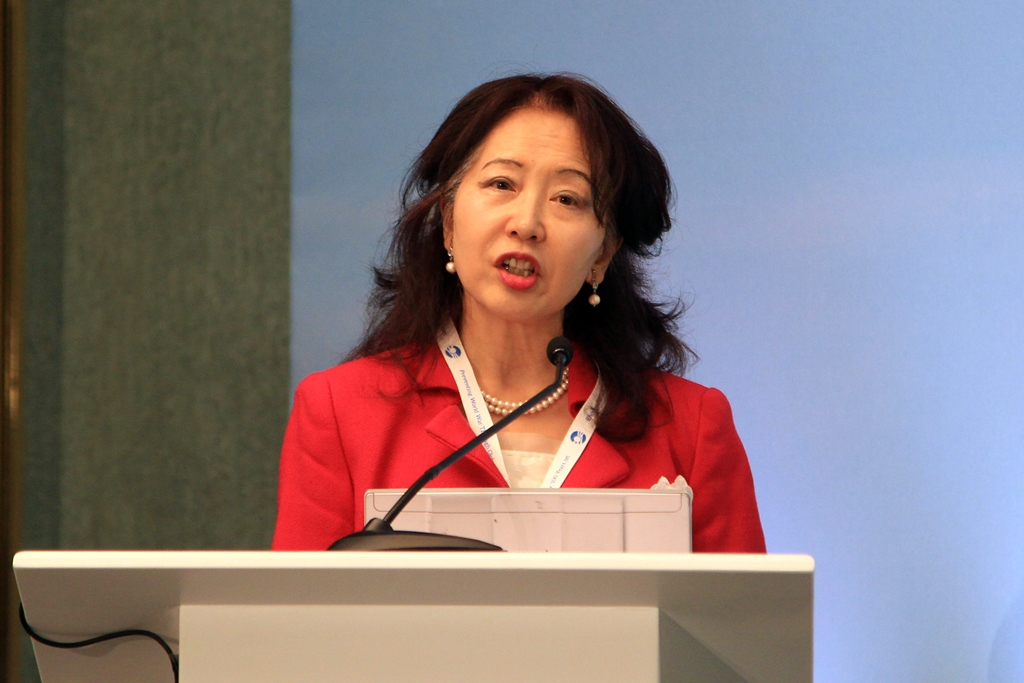
- Education: Tsuda College
- Scientific career
- Fields: International Politics
- Institutions: Aoyama Gakuin University

Kumiko Haba (羽場 久美子, Haba Kumiko) (born 1952) is a Japanese academic and an emeritus professor of international relations at Aoyama Gakuin University in Tokyo. Her research focus is on international relations, global cooperation, migration, nationalism and xenophobia, and political stability. She's written extensively about the EU and Brexit and more recently about Trump. Haba is the author of more than 50 books and 160 articles.

== Early life and education ==
Haba graduated from Tsuda College.

== Career ==
Haba taught at Hosei University from 1985 to 2007. She has been a professor of international relations at Aoyama Gakuin University in Tokyo since 2007

She has also been a visiting lecturer at the Hungarian Academy of Sciences (1995–96), the University of London (1996-7), the Sorbonne (2004), Harvard University (2011–12), the University of Tokyo, Kyoto University, and Keio University.

In 2005, she received a Jean Monnet Chair from the European Union.

Her research focus is on international relations, global cooperation, migration, nationalism and xenophobia, and political stability. She's written extensively about the EU and Brexit and more recently about Trump

Haba has held numerous board positions including President of Japanese Association for the Improvement of Conditions of Women Scientists, member of the Japanese Science Council, director of the Institute for Global International Relations European Institute at Hosei University, member of the governing council of the International Studies Association from 2003-2005 and vice president of the association from 2016–17, as well as general secretary of the Japanese Association for Russian and East European Studies.

In 2021, Haba was conferred with the title of professor emerita by Aoyama Gakuin University.

== Works ==
Haba is the author of more than 50 books and 160 articles including the following:

- Kumiko Haba, Alfredo Canavero, Satoshi Mizobata. 2022. "100 Years of World Wars and Post-War Regional Collaboration". Springer. ISBN 978-981-16-9972-6
- S Rosefielde, J Leightner eds. (2017) "China’s market communism: Challenges, Dilemmas, Solutions". Routledge.
- Rosefielde, Steven & Kuboniwa, Masaaki & Mizobata, Satoshi & Haba, Kumiko. (2017). The unwinding of the globalist dream: EU, Russia and China. DOI 10.1142. ISBN 978-981-322-207-6
- K Haba. M Holland eds. (2012) "Brexit and After: Perspectives on European Crisis and Reconsturction from Asia and Europe". Springer Singapore. ISBN 978-981-15-7968-4
- K Haba. (2012) "The Asian regional integration in the global age, the relation among the US-China-Japan and the Trans-Pacific Partnership (TPP)". Iwanami Publishers. Tokyo.
- K Haba. (2010) "The Origin of the Cold War and Eastern Europe—the Turning Point from 1946 to 1948, Investigating from Hungary"
- J Hoós. K Haba. T Palankai. (2002) The Enlargement of the European Union toward Central Europe and the Role of the Japanese economy." Aula Publishing. ISBN 978-963-9345-76-8
- K Haba. (1999) "The Expanding EU and Central Europe Working Paper". International Studies Association National Convention.
