= Taki Fujita =

Japanese educator

- 藤田たき
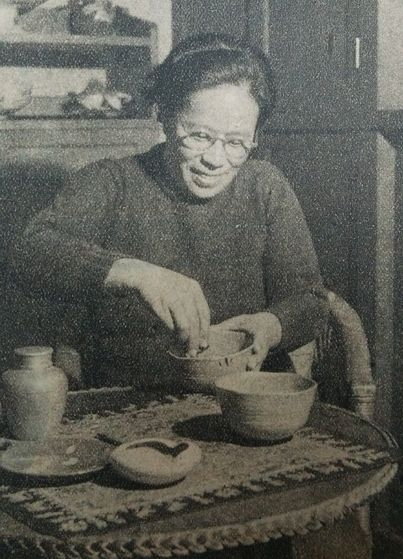
- Taki Fujita in 1947
- Born: 23 December 1898; Nagoya
- Died: 4 January 1993
- Occupation(s): Educator, college president, activist for women's rights

Taki Fujita (藤田たき) (23 December 1898 – 4 January 1993) was a Japanese educator and activist for women's rights. Fujita was president of Tsuda College from 1962 to 1972.

== Early life and education ==
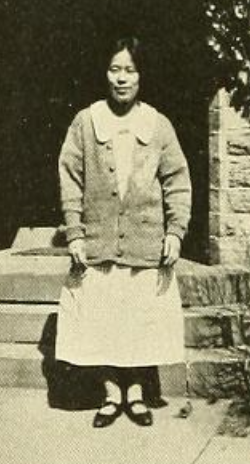
Taki Fujita, from the 1925 yearbook of Bryn Mawr College

Fujita was born in Nagoya, and raised in Okinawa and Osaka, the daughter of a judge, Fujita Kikue, and Fujita Kameki. Her parents were Christian and she was baptized as an infant; as an adult she was drawn to the Quaker tradition. She attended Tsuda College beginning in 1916, and graduated from Bryn Mawr College in 1925. She returned to the United States in 1935 for further study at Smith College.

== Career ==
Fujita taught at Tsuda College. In 1946, she and American educator Lulu Holmes co-founded the Japanese Association of University Women, and Fujita was the association's first president. In 1962, she took office as the fourth president of Tsuda College.

Fujita represented the YWCA at the Pan-Pacific Women's Conference in Honolulu in 1928. She was active in the Japanese women's suffrage organizations from 1929 to 1940, and translated Western suffrage writings into Japanese. She ran for a seat in the Japanese legislature in 1950 and in 1956, was president of the League of Women Voters of Japan, and represented Japan at the United Nations Commission on the Status of Women and at General Assembly. She served in the Labor Ministry from 1951 to 1955, as director of the Women’s and Children’s Bureau.

Fujita was injured in a car accident in 1971 and retired from Tsuda University in 1972. In 1975 she headed the Japanese delegation to the World Conference of the International Women’s Year, held in Mexico City. In 1984, she was awarded the First Class Order of the Sacred Treasure.

== Selected publications ==
- "The Higher Education of Women in Japan" (1938)
- "The Spiritual Life of Japanese Women" (1939)
- "The progress of the emancipation of Japanese women" (1947)
- "Women’s Viewpoint: Leading the Way" (1954)
- Japanese Women in the Postwar Years (1954)
- "Prostitution Prevention Law" (1956)
- "Women and Politics in Japan" (1968)
- "Devoted to women's movement: A personality of Ichikawa" (1982)

== Personal life ==
Fujita used a cane after her car accident in 1971. She was assisted in her later years by her niece and by an adopted daughter. She died in 1993, aged 94 years.
