= Aoyama Gakuin University =

Private university in Shibuya, Tokyo, Japan

- 青山学院大学
- Motto: The Salt of the Earth and Light of the World
- Type: Private
- Established: 1874
- Chancellor: Kenichi Semba
- Faculty: 1,653
- Administrative staff: 1,983
- Students: 19,993
- Undergraduates: 18,527
- Postgraduates: 1,436
- Location: Shibuya, Tokyo, Japan; 35°39′40″N 139°42′38″E
- Campus: Urban
- Website: www.aoyama.ac.jp/en/ (in English)

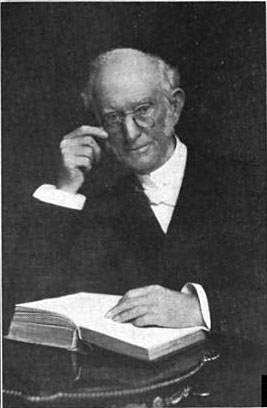
Robert Samuel Maclay (first president of Aoyama Gakuin)

Aoyama Gakuin University (Japanese: 青山学院大学, Hepburn: Aoyama Gakuin Daigaku; AGU) is a private Christian university in Shibuya, Tokyo, Japan. Originally established in 1874 by missionaries from the Methodist Episcopal Church, it was reconfigured in its current form in 1949 as tertiary component of the Aoyama Gakuin.

The university's undergraduate and graduate programs include courses on literature, law, economics, business, international politics, economics, communication, science, engineering and cultural studies. The university graduate programs include international management, law and professional accounting.

Aoyama Gakuin University participates in Hakone Ekiden, an annual university relay race between Tokyo and Hakone in Japan. Recently they won the races in 2015, 2016, 2017, 2018, 2020, 2022, 2024, 2025, and 2026.

== General information ==
The main campus, located in Omotesando in central Tokyo, is complemented by the Sagamihara Campus in Kanagawa Prefecture. The latter houses the College of Science and Sports. The university has graduated around 180,000 students and employs over 1,600 full and part-time faculty members. Aoyama Gakuin University is accredited by the British University Association and is a member of the British Association of Private College and Universities.

The university maintains a number of active international exchange programs for students and faculty. Many of the students and faculty have attended universities and research institutes abroad, while the institution itself has attracted numerous outstanding scholars and students from around the world to its campuses.

== Organization ==
=== Undergraduate programs ===
- College of Literature
- College of Education, Psychology and Human Studies
- College of Economics
- Faculty of Law
- School of Business
- School of International Politics, Economics and Communication (SIPEC)
- School of Cultural and Creative Studies
- College of Science and Engineering
- School of Social Informatics
- School of Global Studies and Collaboration
- College of Community Studies (started in 2019)

=== Graduate programs ===
- Graduate School of Literature
- Graduate School of Education, Psychology and Human Studies
- Graduate School of Economics
- Graduate School of Law
- Graduate School of Business
- Graduate School of International Politics, Economics and Communication
- Graduate School of Cultural and Creative Studies
- Graduate School of Science and Engineering
- Graduate School of Social Informatics
- Graduate School of International Management (MBA)(accredited by EFMD and ABEST21)
- Law School
- Graduate School of Professional Accountancy

=== Research institutes ===
- Research Institute of Aoyama Gakuin University
- Economics Research Center
- Business Law Research Center
- SACRE
- Global Business Research Center
- Global Politics and Economy Research Center
- Information Science Research Center
- WTO Research Center
- Center for Advanced Technology
- Center for Machinery Analysis

== Campus ==
- Aoyama Campus (4-4-25, Shibuya, Shibuya, Tokyo)

Includes two registered Tangible Cultural Properties, "Majima Memorial Hall（間島記念館）" and "Berry Hall".

- Sagamihara Campus (5-10-1, Fuchinobe, Sagamihara, Kanagawa)
- Midorigaoka Ground (2-6097-1, Midorigaoka, Sagamihara, Kanagawa)
- Machida Ground (1571, Kotani, Onoji-cho, Machida, Tokyo)

=== Aoyama Gakuin Memorial Hall ===
Aoyama Gakuin Memorial Hall (University Gymnasium)
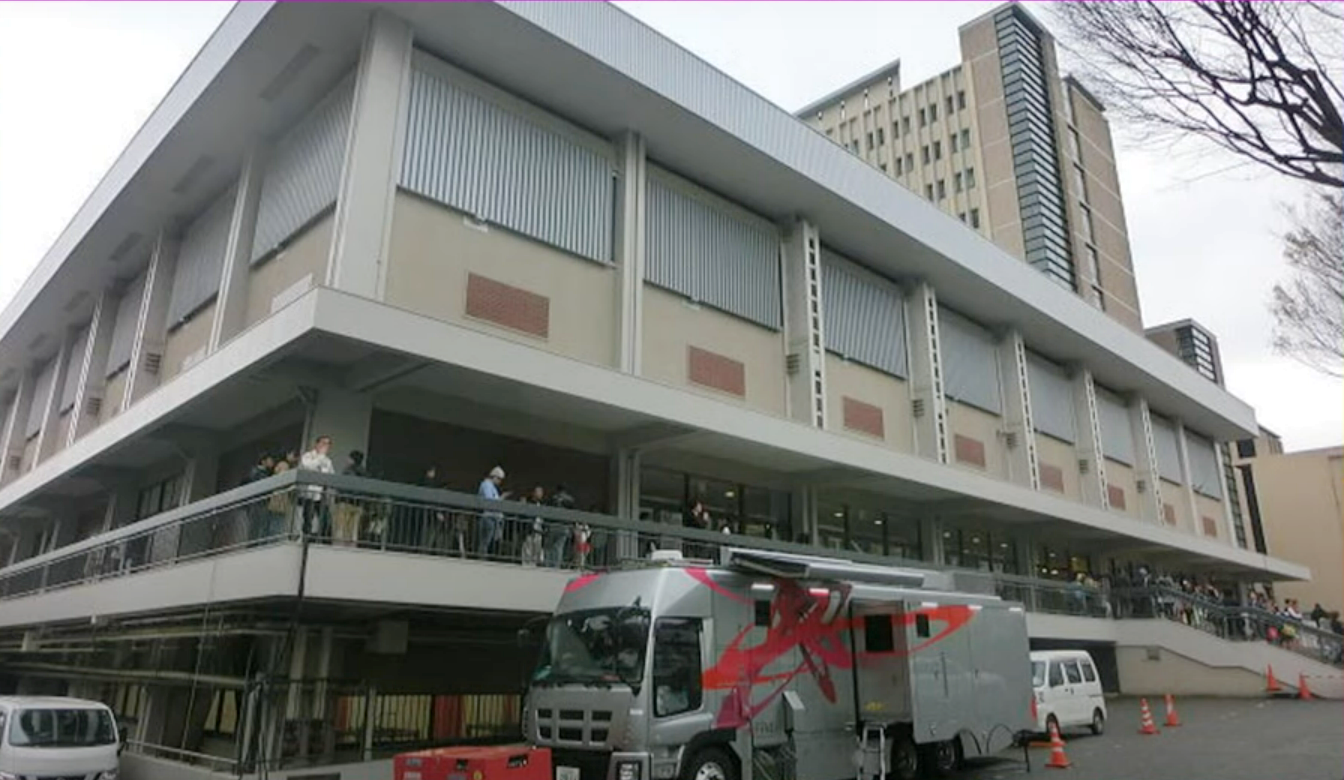
- Interactive map of Aoyama Gakuin Memorial Hall (University Gymnasium)
- Full name: Aoyama Gakuin Memorial Hall (University Gymnasium)
- Location: Shibuya, Tokyo, Japan
- Owner: AGU
- Operator: AGU
- Capacity: Concert:6,000; Basketball:2,500

Construction
- Opened: 1964

Tenants
- Pan Pacific Open(1988–89); Sun Rockers Shibuya (2016–)

Aoyama Gakuin Memorial Hall is a large gymnasium located on the Aoyama Campus. It was completed in 1964, the year Tokyo hosted the Olympic Games. The facility has a seating capacity of 2,500 spectators and can accommodate up to 6,000 people at maximum capacity. The hall serves multiple purposes, hosting various events such as entrance and graduation ceremonies, official domestic and international sporting competitions, cultural events, and concerts. It is the home arena of the Sun Rockers Shibuya of the B.League, Japan's professional basketball league.

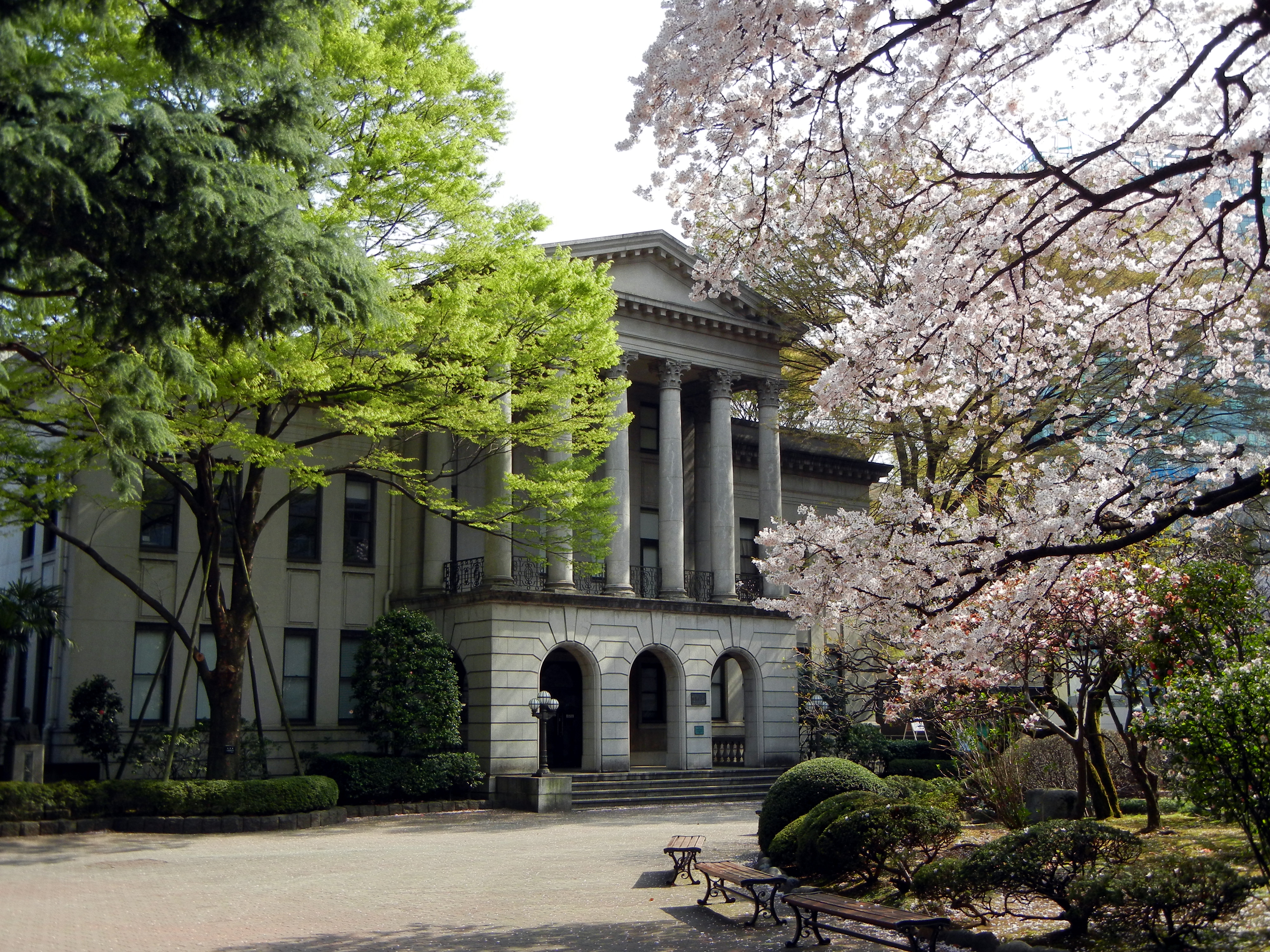
Majima Memorial Hall in Aoyama campus

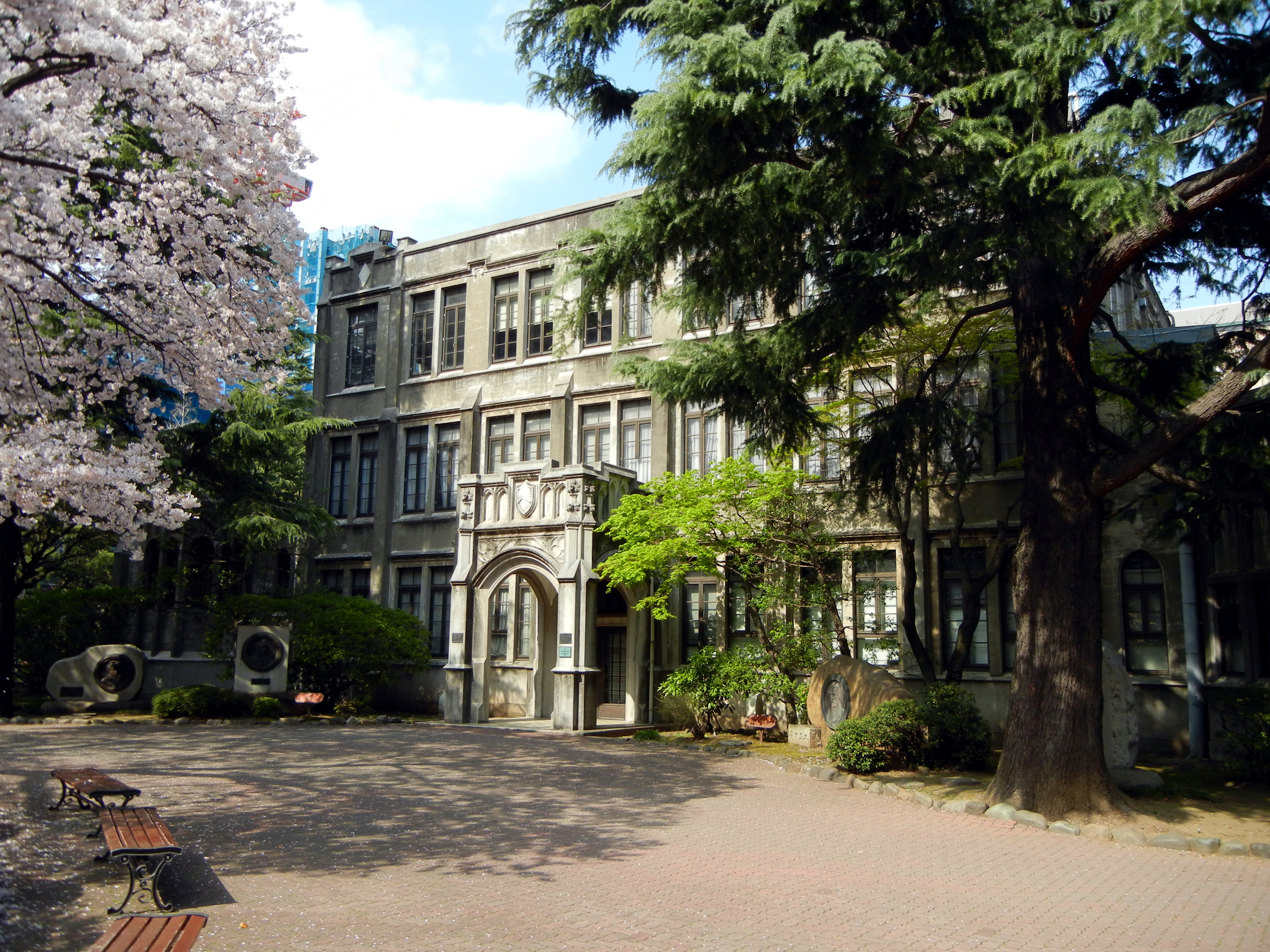
Berry Hall in Aoyama campus

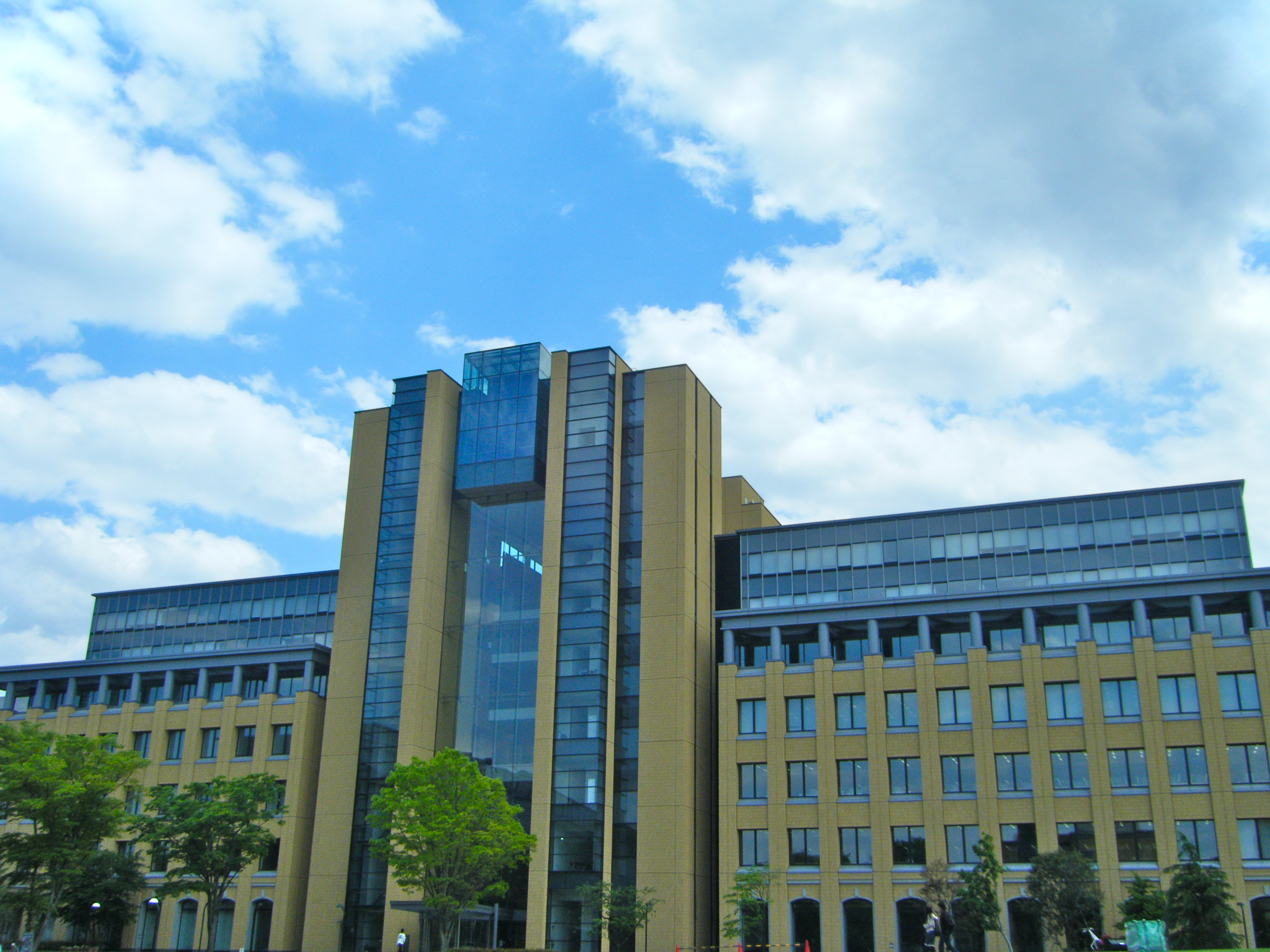
Sagamihara campus Bldg.B

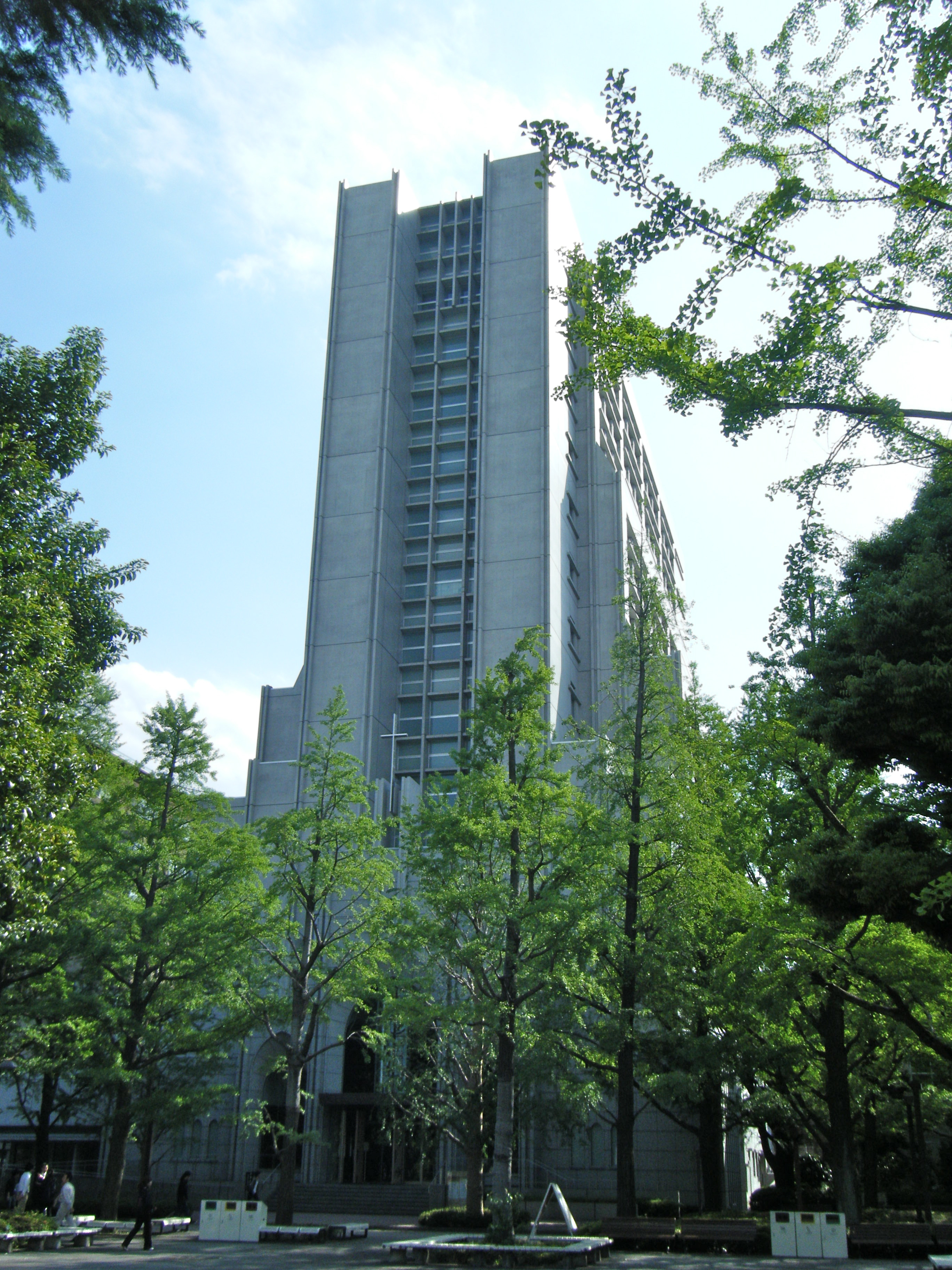
Goucher Memorial Hall in Aoyama campus

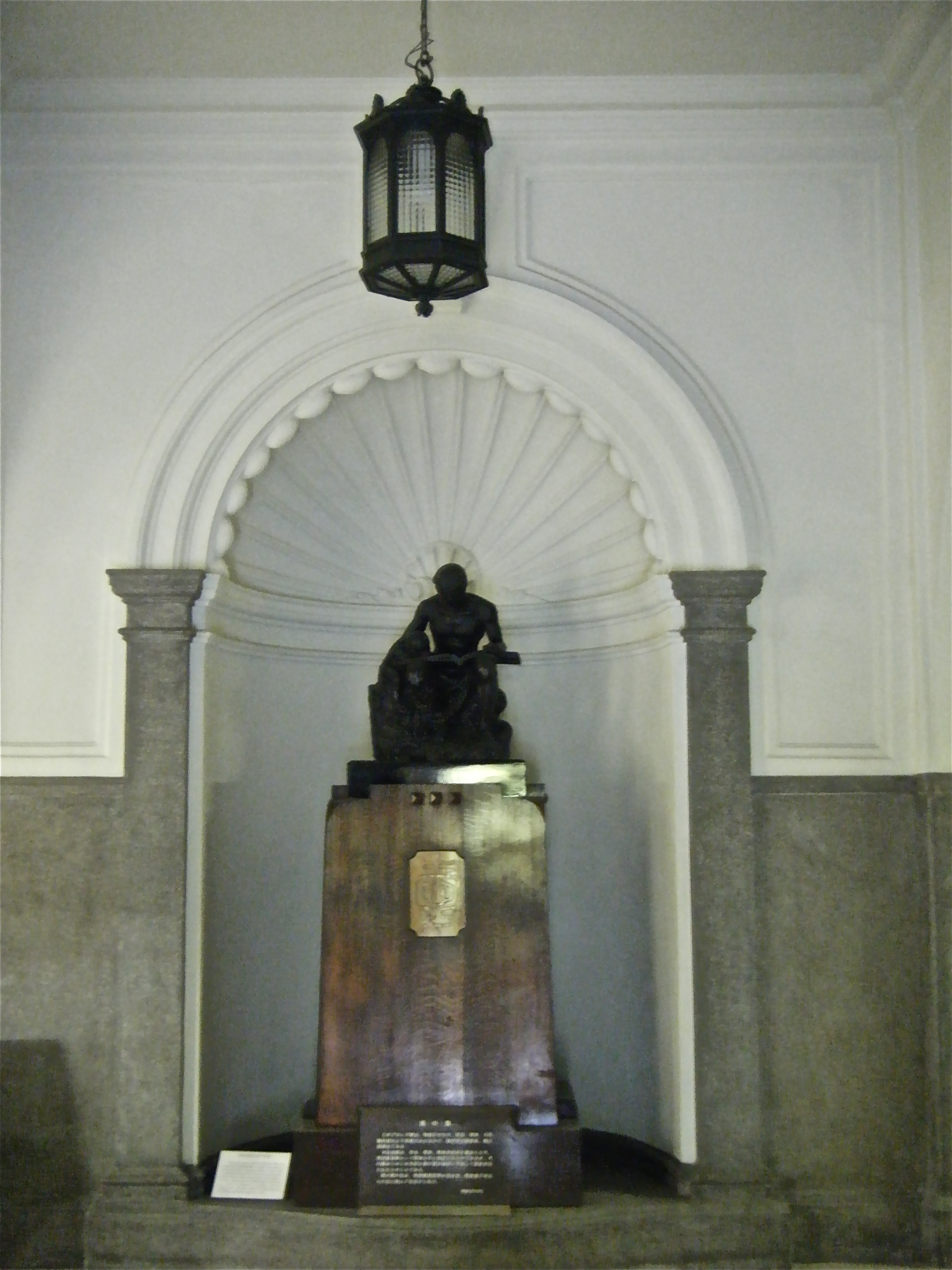
Statue of Love in Majima Archives

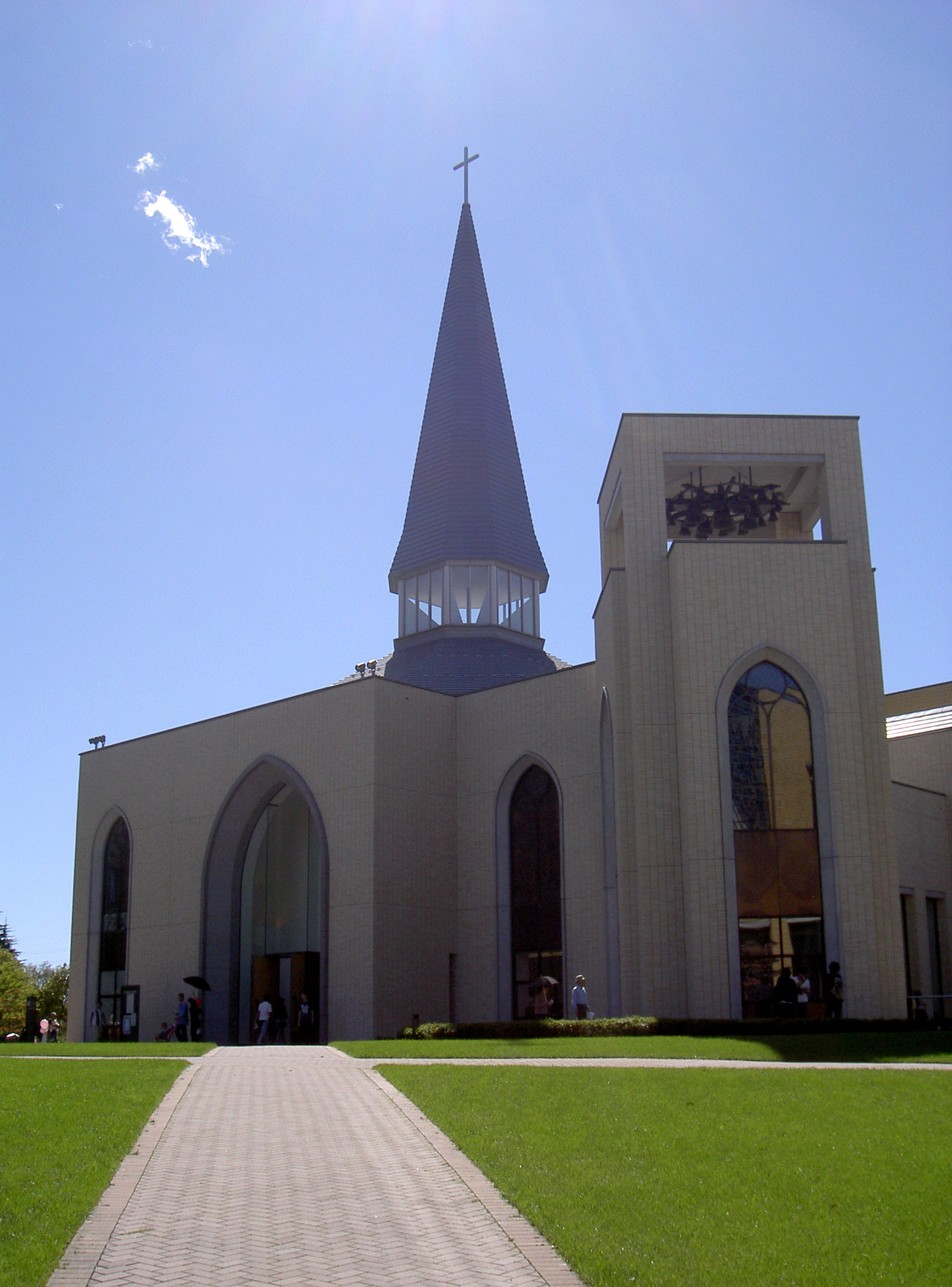
Chapel at the Sagamihara campus

== Rankings ==
University rankings
Global
QS	General	1201-1400

Regional
QS Asia (Asia version)	General	351-400

The school ranks 11th in the country in the number of alumni elected to the National Diet, and 13th in the number of alumni holding executive-level positions in the country with listed companies. Its graduates rank 8th in Japan in the number of successful passings of the national CPA exam.

The university is also on the list of top 20 most popular universities in Tokyo.https://www.unirank.org/jp/tokyo/ The main campus is located in the Shibuya area, and the students are generally viewed as having come from more affluent backgrounds and are regarded as sophisticated. The school has been lauded for its undergraduate focus on the humanities and business education.

In the 2020–2021 University Brand Image Survey conducted by Nikkei BP Consulting, Aoyama Gakuin University ranked 5th overall in the Greater Tokyo Area and 4th out of the private universities after Waseda, Keio, and Sophia Universities.

- QS World university rankings 201: 701+
  - Modern Languages 201: 151–200
- QS Asian university rankings 201: 201–250

== Notable faculty ==
- Robert March (International business)
- Kumiko Haba (Political science, International Relations)
- Karl-Friedrich Lenz (German law, EU Law)
- Masami Sumiyoshi (Philosophy of law)
- Noritada Matsuda (Politics, Political science)
- Yoshikazu Miki (Tax law, president of the university)
- Akira Ishii (Criminology)
- Junichi Kikuchi (Intellectual property law)
- Munehide Nishizawa (Civil procedure, French law)
- Shin Hae Bong (International law)
- Yasunori Osono (Internal medicine)

== Notable graduates ==
=== Politicians ===
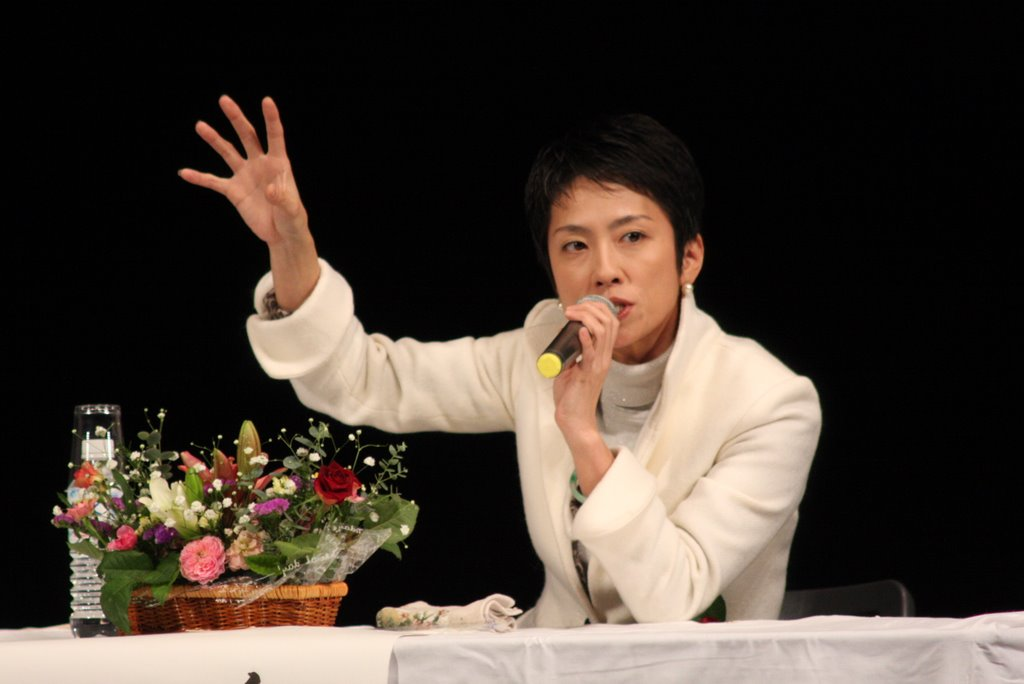
Renhō (member of the house of councilors, consumer affairs minister)

- Tsuyoshi Takagi (member of the house of representatives, Minister for Reconstruction)
- Kenko Matsuki (member of the house of representatives)
- Shunichi Yamaguchi (member of the house of representatives, Minister of state for science and technology policy)
- Haruko Arimura (member of the House of councilors, Minister in charge of women's activities)
- Renhō (member of the house of councilors, the leader of the Democratic Party of Japan, consumer affairs minister)
- Hiroya Ebina (the mayor of Kushiro, Hokkaido)
- Hiroshi Nakada (the former mayor of Yokohama, member of the House of Councillors)

=== Writers ===
- Kiyoshi Kawakami (Christian journalist)
- Atsuko Asano (novelist)
- Hideyuki Kikuchi (novelist)
- Fusanosuke Natsume (caricaturist)
- Nejime Shōichi (poet)
- Seiichi Morimura (novelist)
- Shigeaki Kato (novelist)
- Reki Kawahara (novelist)
- Yoshiko Miya (journalist)

=== Film and television ===
- Yumi Asō (actress)
- Mari Hoshino (actress)
- Naomi Kawashima (actress)
- Horan Chiaki (actress, caster)
- Emi Kobayashi (TV performer)
- Ai Maeda (actress)
- Yōji Matsuda (actor)
- Rie Oh (sports caster)
- Sayaka Ohara (voice actress)
- Ayana Tsubaki (model and TV personality)
- Tetsuya Watari (actor)
- Christel Takigawa (TV announcer)
- Akiko Kuji (TV announcer, model)
- Shinobu Terajima (actress, the Best Actress award at the 60th Berlin Film Festival)
- Takako Fuji (actress)
- Kanon Takao (voice actress)

=== Musicians ===
- Keisuke Kuwata (musician, leader of Southern All Stars)
- Kazuyuki Sekiguchi (musician, member of Southern All Stars)
- Masato Nakamura (musician, member of Dreams Come True)
- Yuko Hara (musician, member of Southern All Stars)
- Shinji Harada (singer)
- Noriyuki Makihara (singer)
- Love Psychedelico (musician)
- Shigeaki Kato (singer, member of NEWS)
- Stephanie (singer)
- Nana Tanimura (singer)
- Rei Fujita (singer, member of DUSTZ)
- Jun Senoue (musician, member of Crush 40)
- Mari Hamada (singer)
- Yoohei Kawakami (musician, leader of Alexandros)
- Hiroyuki Isobe (musician, member of Alexandros)

=== Sports ===
- Tadahito Iguchi (baseball player)
- Rika Hiraki (tennis player)
- Daisuke Nakajima (auto racing driver)
- Shinsuke Nakamura (professional wrestler)
- Hiroshi Ogawa (baseball player)
- Yosuke Takasu (baseball player)
- Masataka Yoshida (baseball player)
- Mina Shirakawa (Pro Wrestler)

=== Business ===
- Hajime Satomi (president of Sega)
- Makoto Fujita (president of CyberAgent)
- Shin Dong-bin (president of Lotte Korea)
- Ryo Morikawa (president of LINE)
- Shinichi Koide (chairman, president and CEO of Salesforce.com Co., Ltd.)
- Ryuichi Isaka (president of Seven-Eleven Japan Co., Ltd.)
- Akiyoshi Koji (president of Asahi Breweries, Ltd.)

=== Researchers ===
- Tetsu Tamura (meteorologist, oceanographer)
- Kumiko Haba (political scientist, international relations)
- Masaaki Shirakawa (The 30th governor of the Bank of Japan, economist)
- Eisuke Sakakibara (former vice-minister for finance for international affairs, economist)
- Takenori Inoki (economist, honorary professor of Osaka University)
- Nobuo Ikeda (economist, blogger)
- Hiroyuki Suzuki (Architectural historian)
- Tamostu Aoki (The commissioner of the Agency for Cultural Affairs, director of The National Art Center, Tokyo)
