= Hiroyuki Suzuki (architectural historian) =

Hiroyuki Suzuki (鈴木 博之, Suzuki Hiroyuki; May 14, 1945 – February 3, 2014) was a prominent Japanese architectural historian who also established a reputation abroad.

For most of his career Suzuki was Professor of the History of Architecture at the University of Tokyo (1974-2009), and for a period was also Chairman of Tokyo University's Graduate School of Architecture. Later in life he joined the faculty of the School of Cultural and Creative Studies at Aoyama University. He was the author of over a dozen books and countless articles in Japanese, but was best known to English readers as the co-author (with Reyner Banham and Kobayashi Katsuhiro) of Contemporary Architecture of Japan, 1958-1984 (New York: Rizzoli, 1985) and Shuhei Endo: Paramodern Architecture (Phaidon Press, 2006), among others.

His Japanese-language scholarship ranged from research on such prominent Meiji-period figures as Josiah Conder and Itō Chūta (伊東忠太), to many works on contemporary Tokyo, a city to which he was strongly attached. He was among the first architectural historians inside or outside Japan to focus on Meiji and Taisho-period architects and architecture, and argue for continuities between this and the later post-war period when Japanese 'modern' architecture became globally influential.

Suzuki was a strong proponent of preserving "modern", and not just "traditional" Japanese architecture, and did not shy from wading into development controversies. As chairman of the Japanese branch of the Paris-based conservation group Docomomo International, he oversaw drafting of a list of 135 "modern" Japanese structures worthy of protection. He was a prominent member of the Architectural Consortium that in 2012 received the World Monuments Fund / Knoll Modernism Prize for saving and restoring the Hizuchi Elementary School in Shikoku, designed by Masatsune Matsumura in the late 1950s. He also consulted on the restoration of Tokyo Station.

For twelve years (1996-2008) Suzuki was one of three members of the Ad Hoc Group of Experts at the Coordinating Committee of Angkor (ICC), advising the Cambodian government on the preservation of Angkor Wat

Among many honors, Suzuki was a recipient of Japan's Medal of Honor (褒章 hōshō) with Purple Ribbon for his service to scholarship.
