= Rie Oh =

Japanese sports announcer

- 王理恵
- Born: Wáng Lǐhuì; 7 March 1970 (age 56); Tokyo
- Education: Aoyama Gakuin University
- Presenting career
- Show: Ō Rie no surō no kibun de
- Station: RKB Radio
- Time slot: 17:35-17:45 (Saturdays)
- Style: Radio and Television presenter

Rie Oh

Chinese name
- Chinese: 王理恵
Transcriptions
Standard Mandarin
- Hanyu Pinyin: Wáng Lǐhuì

Japanese name
- Kanji: 王理恵
- Hiragana: おう りえ
- Katakana: オー リエ
Transcriptions
- Romanization: Ō Rie

Rie Oh (王 理恵, Ō Rie; born March 7, 1970, in Tokyo, Japan) is a TV sportscaster and presenter on the J-Wave radio station in Japan.

Oh is the second daughter of former baseball player and Fukuoka SoftBank Hawks team manager Sadaharu Oh. She graduated from Aoyama Gakuin University in Tokyo, and is also qualified as a "Junior vegetable and fruit meister" or "Vegetable sommelier". She worked for the Hakuhodo advertising agency before moving to TV in 1996.

Rie Oh holds Taiwanese citizenship because her father did not want his daughters to become naturalized Japanese, although neither could speak Chinese.

== Personal life ==
Previously married twice, Oh was engaged to marry psychiatrist Masaki Honda in January 2008, but subsequently broke off the engagement. Honda was the personal doctor to sumo yokozuna Asashoryu.

== TV commercials ==
- Oligo no kage (2007–)
- House Hokkaido Stew (2007)
