= Nobuo Ikeda =

Japanese economist

- Born: 1953 (age 72–73); Kyoto Prefecture

Nobuo Ikeda (池田 信夫, Ikeda Nobuo; born 1953) is a Japanese economist originally from Kyoto Prefecture. He used to be a professor at Jobu University until 2012. His current appointments are a visiting professor at SBI Graduate School in Yokohama, Kanagawa, a lecturer at Aoyama Gakuin University, and the Chief Executive Officer of Agora Institute.

== Works ==
- Ikeda, Nobuo (2006). 電波利権 [Broadcast concession]. Shinchosha. ISBN 4106101505.
- Ikeda, Nobuo (2007). 過剰と破壊の経済学: 「ムーアの法則」で何が変わるのか? [Economics of surplus and destruction]. Ascii Media Network. ISBN 978-4756150776.
- Ikeda, Nobuo (2008). ハイエク知識社会の自由主義 [Democracy of Hayek knowledge society]. PHP Institute. ISBN 978-4569699912.
- Ikeda, Nobuo (2011). イノベーションとは何か [What is the innovation]. Toyo Keizai Shinposha. ISBN 978-4492502273.
- Ikeda, Nobuo (2012). 原発「危険神話」の崩壊 [Nuclear power: Demise of "Risk myth"]. PHP Institute. ISBN 978-4569802626.
- Ikeda, Nobuo (2013). アベノミクスの幻想: 日本経済に「魔法の杖」はない [Illusion of Abenomics]. Toyo Keizai Shinposha. ISBN 978-4492395905.
- Ikeda, Nobuo (2013). 「空気」の構造: 日本人はなぜ決められないのか [Structure of "Atmosphere"]. Hakushuisha. ISBN 978-4560082829.
- Ikeda, Nobuo (2014). 資本主義の正体: マルクスで読み解くグローバル経済の歴史 [Identity of capitalism]. PHP Institute. ISBN 978-4569818719.
- Ikeda, Nobuo (2014). 朝日新聞世紀の大誤報: 慰安婦問題の深層 [False report of Asahi Shimbun]. Aspect. ISBN 978-4757223806.
- Ikeda, Nobuo (2014). 古典で読み解く現代経済 [Modern Economics deciphered by classics]. PHP Institute. ISBN 978-4569796727.
- Ikeda, Nobuo (2014). 日本人のためのピケティ入門: ６０分でわかる『２１世紀の資本』のポイント [Introduction of Piketty for Japanese]. Toyo Keizai Shinposha. ISBN 978-4492444146.
