= Tsuda Sen =

Japanese politician, educator and writer

- 津田 仙
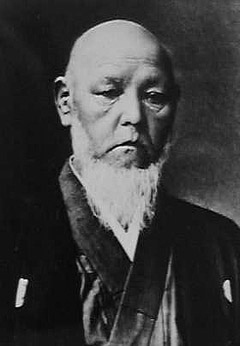
- Tsuda Sen
- Born: August 6, 1837; Sakura, Chiba, Japan
- Died: April 24, 1908 (aged 70); Tokyo, Japan
- Burial place: Aoyama Cemetery
- Occupations: Educator, Agriculturalist, Entrepreneur
- Known for: One of the founders of Aoyama Gakuin university
- Spouse: Tsuda Hatsuko
- Children: Tsuda Umeko

Tsuda Sen (津田 仙; August 6, 1837 – April 24, 1908) was a politician, educator and writer in Meiji period Japan. He was one of the founders of Aoyama Gakuin university, and the father of noted author and educator Tsuda Umeko.

== Biography ==
Tsuda was born as the fourth son of a low ranking samurai of Sakura domain in Shimōsa (present day Sakura city, Chiba Prefecture). At the age of 15, he was sent to the domain's school, where he learned English and Dutch, and afterwards was sent to Edo, where he studied rangaku. He was hired by the Tokugawa bakufu as an interpreter, and accompanied Fukuzawa Yukichi on a mission to purchase warships in the United States in 1867.

After the Meiji Restoration, Tsuda joined the new Meiji government, and enthusiastically embraced the rapid westernization drive. He opened the first western style hotel in Tsukiji in 1867, near the foreign settlement. He also spent time with the Hokkaido Colonization Office, where he made close contacts with future Prime Minister Kuroda Kiyotaka. Around this time he developed a strong interest in women's education, and when the revolutionary idea of sending women overseas as exchange students with the Iwakura Mission, he quickly volunteered his daughter Umeko. Tsuda also influenced the creation of the Friends School, a women's junior and senior high school established in 1887 in Tokyo.

In 1873 Tsuda attended the Vienna Expo, where he met Sano Tsunetami (founder of the Japanese Red Cross), and where he received a lesson on Western agricultural techniques, particularly artificial crop pollination. After returning to Japan in May 1874, he opened the Gakunosha Nogakko (Gakunosha School of Agriculture) in Azabu, Tokyo and worked to introduce and promote Western vegetables (particularly corn) and fruits. He initially sold the corn by mail advertisement, and is thus also the first such entrepreneur in Japan. He also established a magazine, Nogyo Zasshi, aimed at the agricultural market. Around this time, it is believed that he also converted to Christianity, and he later became a strong temperance campaigner.

A supporter of agrarian rights, he was involved in the Ashio Copper Mine Scandal, one of Japan's first environmental disputes.

Tsuda also played an important role in establishing Christian schools, such as Aoyama Gakuin, Doshisha University, Friend's Girls' School, and Tokyo School for the Blind and Deaf (currently the Tsukuba Daigaku Fuzoku Mougakko). He was involved in most of the work to create the early foundation of Aoyama Gakuin.

He died on the Tokaido line train of a cerebral hemorrhage, and his funeral was held in the auditorium of Aoyama Gakuin, and his grave is at Aoyama Cemetery.
