= Emiko Ohnuki-Tierney =

Japanese-born anthropologist

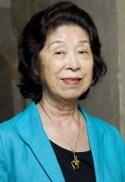
- Born: 1934 (age 91–92); Kobe, Japan

Academic work
- Discipline: Anthropology
- School or tradition: Symbolic anthropology
- Institutions: University of Wisconsin

Emiko Ohnuki-Tierney (Japanese: 大貫恵美子 born 1934) is a noted anthropologist and the William F. Vilas Professor of Anthropology at the University of Wisconsin–Madison. She is the author of fourteen single-authored books in English and in Japanese, in addition to numerous articles. Her books have been translated into many other languages, including Italian, Korean, Polish and Russian. Ohnuki-Tierney was appointed the Distinguished Chair of Modern Culture at the Library of Congress in DC in 2009 and then in 2010 Fellow of Institut d’Études Avancées-Paris. She is a member of The American Academy of Arts and Sciences, its mid-west council member, and a recipient of John Simon Guggenheim Fellowship among other prestigious awards.

== Education ==
A native of Japan, Ohnuki-Tierney was born in Kobe in 1934. She received a B.A. degree from Tsuda College in Tokyo and came to the United States on a Fulbright Scholarship. Her interest in anthropology began when someone told her that she was making too many "cultural" mistakes and should take a course in anthropology. In 1968, she received her Ph.D. in anthropology at the University of Wisconsin-Madison.

== Scholarship ==
Ohnuki-Tierney's first work is a history of the Detroit Chinese community. She next turned to the Sakhalin Ainu resettled in Hokkaido, resulting in two books and several articles. Realizing the limitation of studying a "memory culture," she shifted her focus to the contemporary Japanese. Illness and Culture in Contemporary Japan was her first book on the Japanese among whom she found "cultural germs" and a profusion of "urban magic." This helped her to realize the limitations of only studying a people and their way of life at a particular point in time. All her subsequent works have considered long periods of Japanese history in order to understand "culture through time." Her focus has been on various symbols of identities of the Japanese, such as rice and the monkey, within broader socio-political contexts and in comparative perspective.

Ohnuki-Tierney has been working on the question of power of symbols and its absence in political spaces since the mid-1980s. Her most recent works began as a study of symbolism of cherry blossoms and their viewing in relation to Japanese identities and led to an exploration of the cherry blossom symbol as a major trope utilized to both encourage and aestheticize sacrifice for the country during its military period. This research culminated in two recent books, Kamikaze, Cherry Blossoms, and Nationalisms: The Militarization of Aesthetics in Japanese History and Kamikaze Diaries: Reflections on Japanese Student Soldiers.

She has continued to work on the question of "aesthetic" (broadly defined), ubiquitous in wars of all types, from "tribal warfare" to conflicts between nation-states. This is done against the basic theoretical question of communicative opacity—how people fail to recognize the absence of communication.

Ohnuki-Tierney's most recent book is titled Flowers That Kill: Communicative Opacity in Political Spaces (2015).

== See also ==
- Japanese culture
