= Hiroya Ebina =

Japanese politician (1959–2026)

- 蝦名 大也

Mayor of Kushiro
- In office November 2008 – November 2024
- Preceded by: Yoshitaka Ito
- Succeeded by: Hidenori Tsuruma

Member of the Hokkaido Legislative Assembly
- In office 30 April 1999 – 2008
- Constituency: Kushiro City

Member of the Kushiro City Council
- In office 1993–1999

Personal details
- Born: 4 January 1959 Kushiro, Hokkaido, Japan
- Died: 7 January 2026 (aged 67) Kushiro, Hokkaido, Japan
- Party: Independent
- Education: Aoyama Gakuin University; Bachelor of Law
- Website: www.city.kushiro.lg.jp/smart/00000383.html

Hiroya Ebina (蝦名 大也, Ebina Hiroya; 4 January 1959 – 7 January 2026) was a Japanese politician. He was the mayor of Kushiro, Hokkaido, Japan, from 2008 to 2024 and a member of the Hokkaido Legislative Assembly from 1999 until 2008.

On the evening of 7 January 2026, after returning home from a meeting, he collapsed at his home in Kushiro City and was taken to a hospital, where he died of a sudden cardiac arrest the same day. He was 67.
