= Nejime Shōichi =

Japanese poet and novelist (born 1948)

Nejime Shōichi [ねじめ正一]
- Born: June 16, 1948 (age 78)
- Occupation: Author

Nejime Shōichi (ねじめ 正一, 祢寝 正一; born June 16, 1948) is a Japanese poet and novelist born on June 16, 1948. He dropped out of Aoyama Gakuin University while he was majoring in economics.

== Biography ==
While in Aoyama, he ran a business known as Nejime Mingeiten, a folk craft store. He also was a member of a grass lot baseball team known as the "Fouls".

In 1989, he won the Naoki Prize. In 2001, he was in charge of the NHK panel "Words of Power, Poems of Power".

== Works ==
=== Novels ===
- Poetry Anthologies
- Negima Shoichi Shishu (Negima Shoichi Poetry Anthology)
- Noumaku Menma
- Kōenji Junjō Shōtengai (Koenji pure heart shopping street)

=== Essays ===
- I want to give the power of words
- The enigma of a Nagasaki home.
- 200 Letters to Nagasaki
- Nejime's bruxism

=== Awards ===
- 1989 Naoki Prize.
- One of his stories appears in Read Real Japanese
