= Natsuko Toda =

Japanese subtitle translator (born 1936)

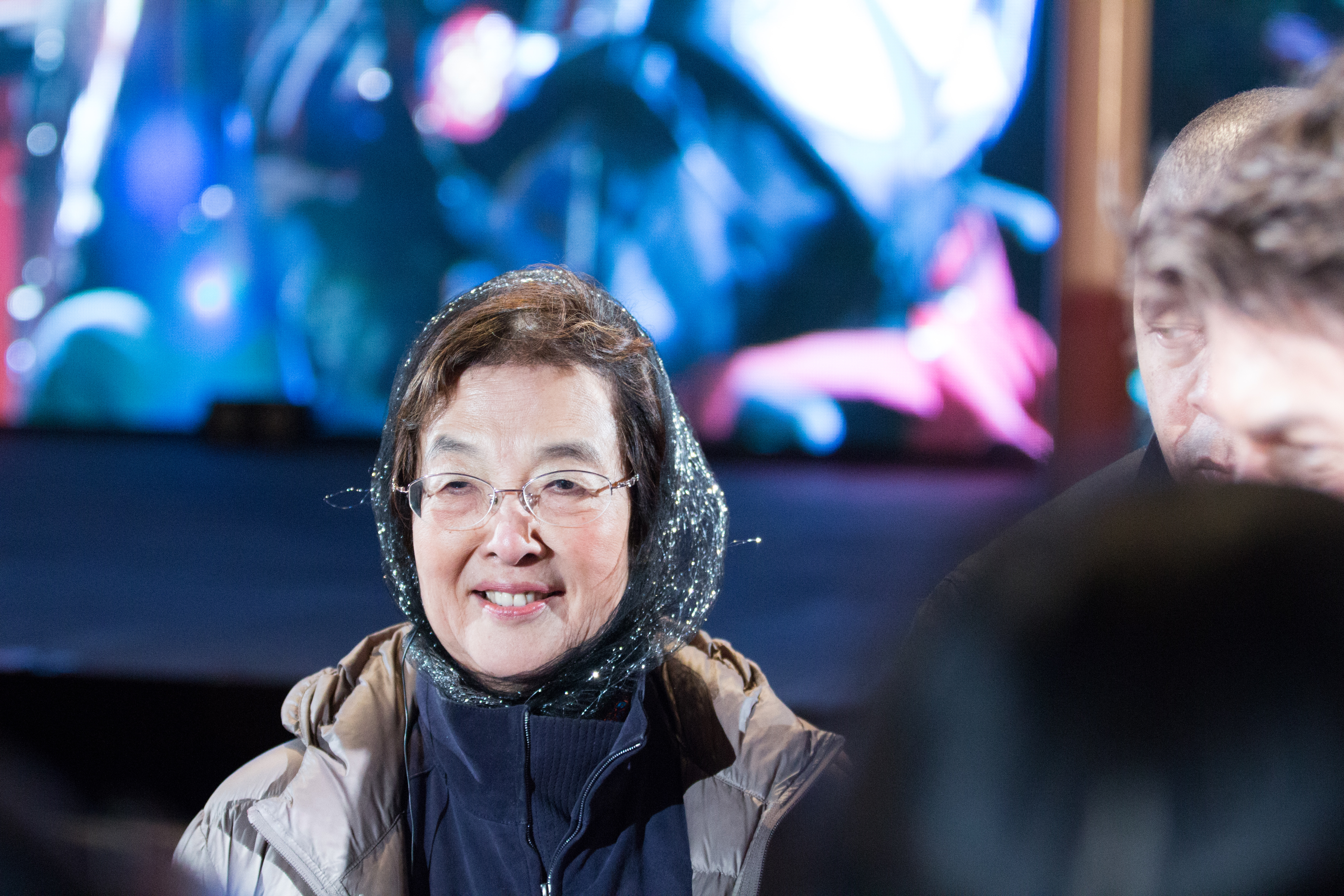

Natsuko Toda (戸田 奈津子, Toda Natsuko; born July 3, 1936) is a Japanese subtitler and film industry interpreter. She has been called "the most famous film translator in Japan [...] unquestionably" and the "Subtitle Queen". She has subtitled more than 1,000 English-language films in Japanese.

== Biography ==
Natsuko Toda was born in Tokyo on July 3, 1936. She graduated from Tsuda College in 1958 and started working as a secretary in a life insurance company, but left after about a year.

She learned the craft of subtitling under the eminent Japanese subtitler Shunji Shimizu. She found a part-time job at the Japanese arm of United Artists through Shimizu. At United Artists she performed miscellaneous tasks including translation. Later, Haruo Mizuno, the advertising manager at the time, asked her to work as an interpreter for movie people from abroad. She has been active as both a subtitler and an interpreter for many visiting stars and filmmakers. She has worked on many high-profile films, including Merry Christmas, Mr. Lawrence and The Last Samurai. Her name is well known to Japanese audiences to the point that Takeshi Kitano's 1995 film Getting Any? contains an inside joke: subtitles that make no sense and are credited on-screen to Toda.

== Criticism ==
Toda has been criticised by some film fans for characteristically odd-sounding translated phrases such as 「～を?」「～かもだ」「ファック野郎」「プッシー知らず」. Toda worked on the subtitles for Full Metal Jacket by Stanley Kubrick, who was closely involved with the translation of the script into subtitles. Kubrick fired Toda when he realised that she had softened or removed the obscenity, which was a crucial part of the script. Japanese movie fans express reservations about her over-free and loose translation, which can detract from the film watching experience.

Natsuko Toda also subtitled The Lord of the Rings: The Fellowship of the Ring, and was criticised by Tolkien fans for her translations, which were inconsistent with the published Japanese translation of the books. Fans petitioned the distributor, Nippon Herald, with complaints about the subtitles. It was later reported that Peter Jackson intended to bring in a new subtitler for the second film in the series, The Lord of the Rings: The Two Towers.

== Films subtitled by Toda ==
- Apocalypse Now (Francis Ford Coppola, 1979)
- Full Metal Jacket (Stanley Kubrick, 1987)
- The Lord of the Rings: The Fellowship of the Ring (Peter Jackson, 2001)
- The Last Samurai (Edward Zwick, 2003)
- The Phantom of the Opera (Joel Schumacher, 2004)

== Books by Toda ==
- Jimaku no Naka ni Jinsei (Tokyo: Hakusuisha, 1994)

== Honours ==
- 45th Japan Academy Film Prize: Distinguished Service Award (2022)
- Order of the Rising Sun, 4th Class, Gold Rays with Rosette (2025)
