= Tomoko Namba =

Japanese businessman

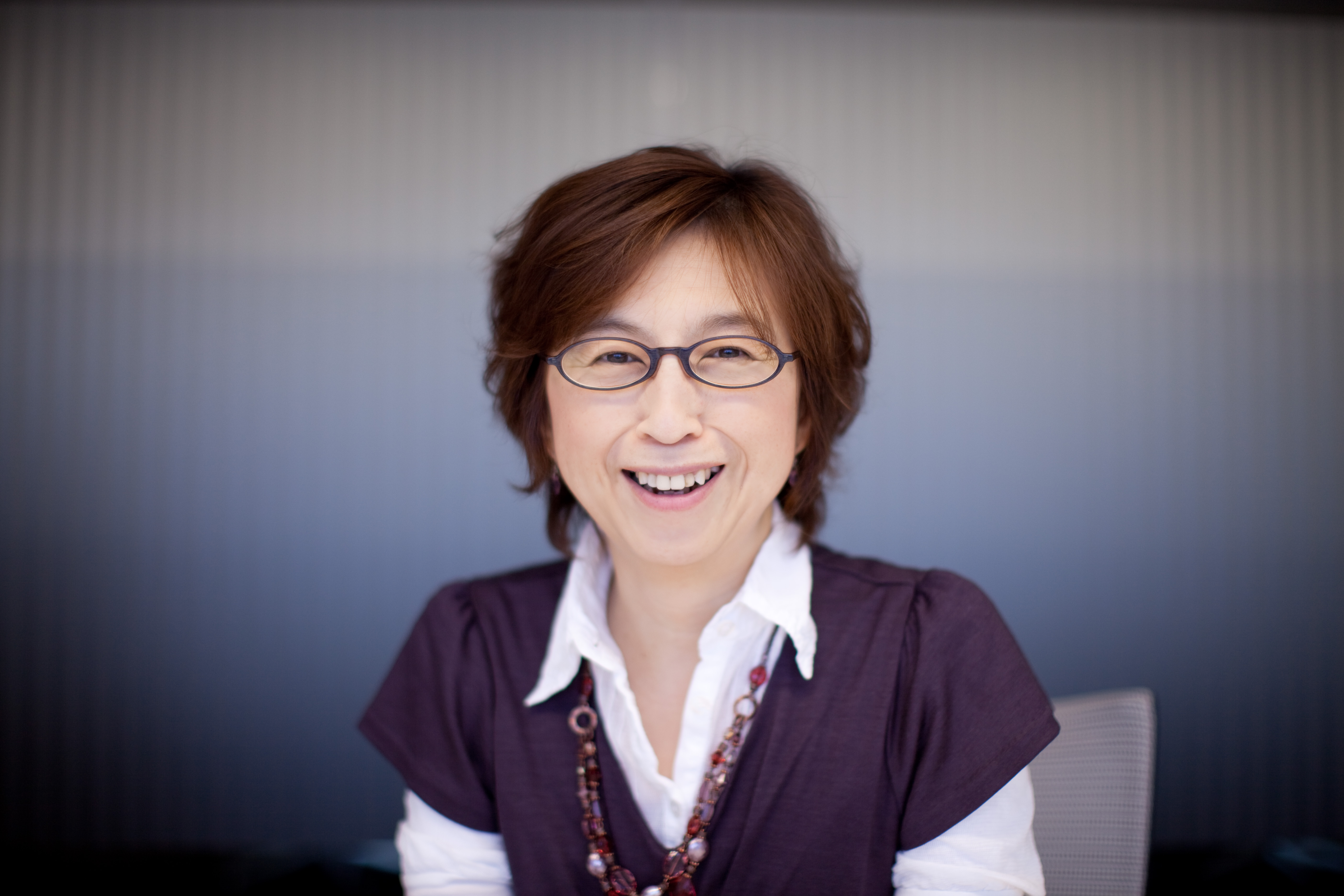
- Born: April 21, 1962 (age 64)
- Education: Harvard Business School; Tsuda College
- Occupation: CEO

Tomoko Namba (南場智子, Namba Tomoko; born April 21, 1962) is a Japanese entrepreneur, and the former CEO of DeNA. She is vice-chair of the Japan Business Federation.

In 1999 she founded DeNA, one of Japan's largest mobile social network and mobile game companies. She transitioned from CEO to Executive Chairman of DeNA in 2011 to focus on her family and personal life. In 2021, she was appointed vice-chair of the Japan Business Foundation to become the first woman in the post in its 75-year history.

Namba received an MBA from Harvard Business School and was the third Japanese woman to become a partner at McKinsey & Co. She started DeNA after working on a consulting assignment with Sony's So-net while she was a consultant at McKinsey.
