= Tsuda Umeko =

Japanese educator (1864–1929)

- 津田 梅子
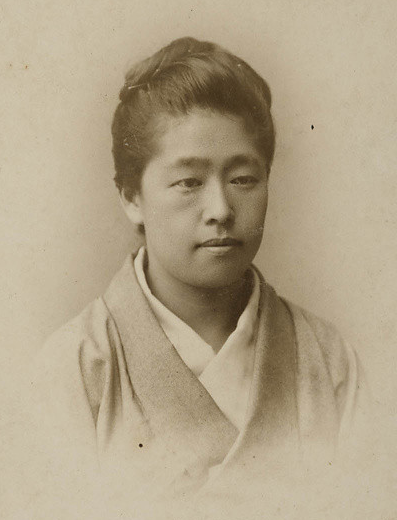
- Tsuda Umeko
- Born: Tsuda Ume (つだ・うめ); December 31, 1864; Ushigome, Edo, Japan
- Died: August 16, 1929 (aged 64); Kamakura, Kanagawa, Japan
- Other name: Ume Tsuda
- Occupation: Educator
- Known for: A pioneer in education for women in Meiji period Japan
- Children: none
- Parent(s): Tsuda Sen (father); Tsuda Hatsuko (mother)

Academic background
- Education: Collegiate School, Georgetown; Archer Institute; Bryn Mawr College; St Hilda's College, Oxford

Academic work
- Era: Meiji
- Institutions: Peeresses' School; Tokyo Women's Normal School; Joshi Eigaku Juku (founder)

Tsuda Umeko (津田 梅子; born Tsuda Ume (津田 梅); December 31, 1864 – August 16, 1929) was a Japanese educator who founded Tsuda University. She was the daughter of Tsuda Sen, an agricultural scientist, and at the age of 7, she became Japan's first female exchange student, traveling to the United States as a member of the Iwakura Mission.

Originally named Tsuda Ume, with ume referring to the Japanese plum, she went by the name Ume Tsuda while studying in the United States before changing her name to Umeko in 1902.

== Early life ==
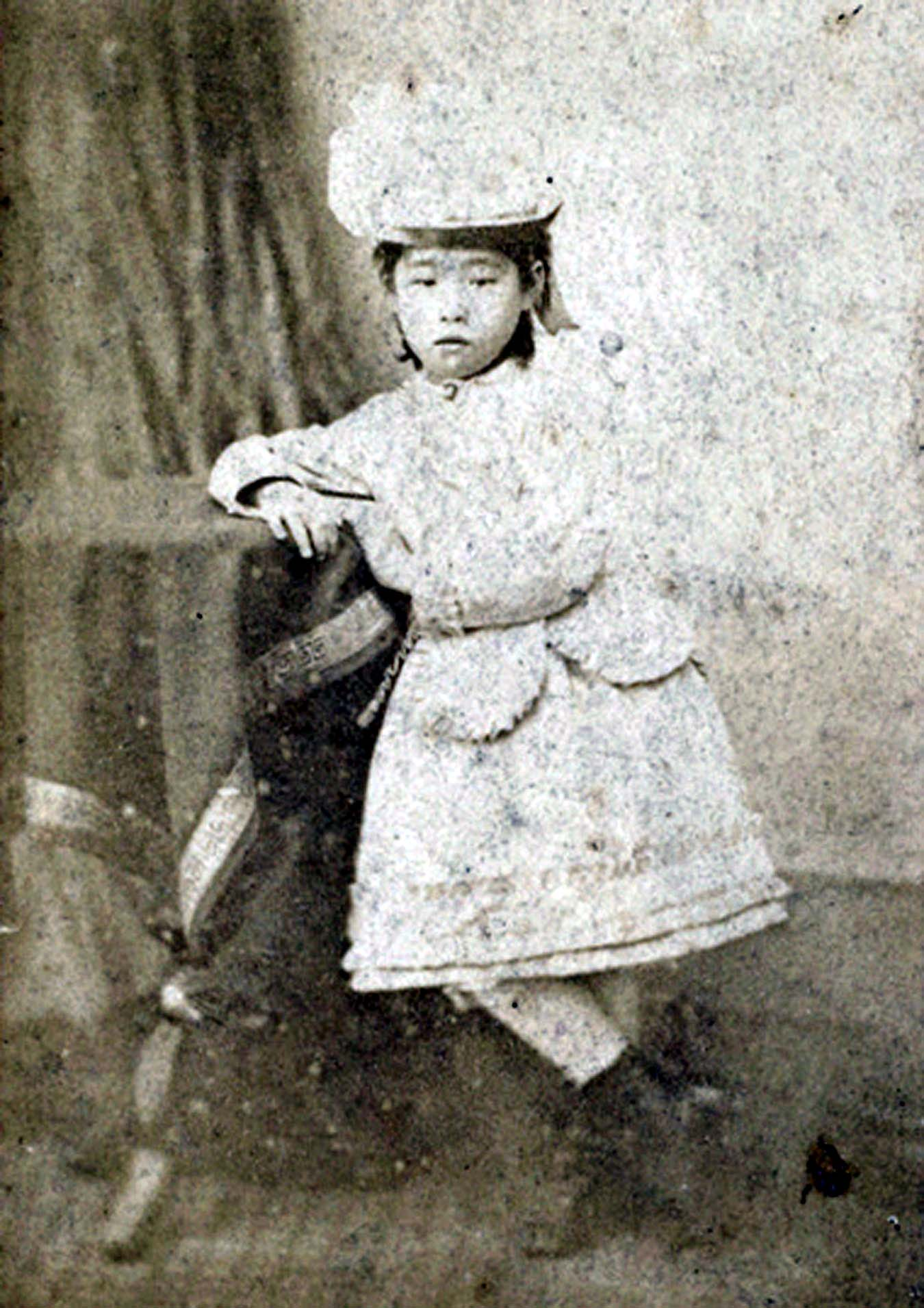
Tsuda Ume at the age of seven in 1871

Tsuda Ume was born in the Ushigome neighborhood of Edo (present Minami, Shinjuku) as the second daughter of Tsuda Sen and his wife Hatsuko, a progressive agriculturist and strong proponent of the westernization and Christianization of Japan. In 1871, Tsuda Sen was involved in the Hokkaido colonization project under Kuroda Kiyotaka, and raised the topic of western education for women as well as for men.

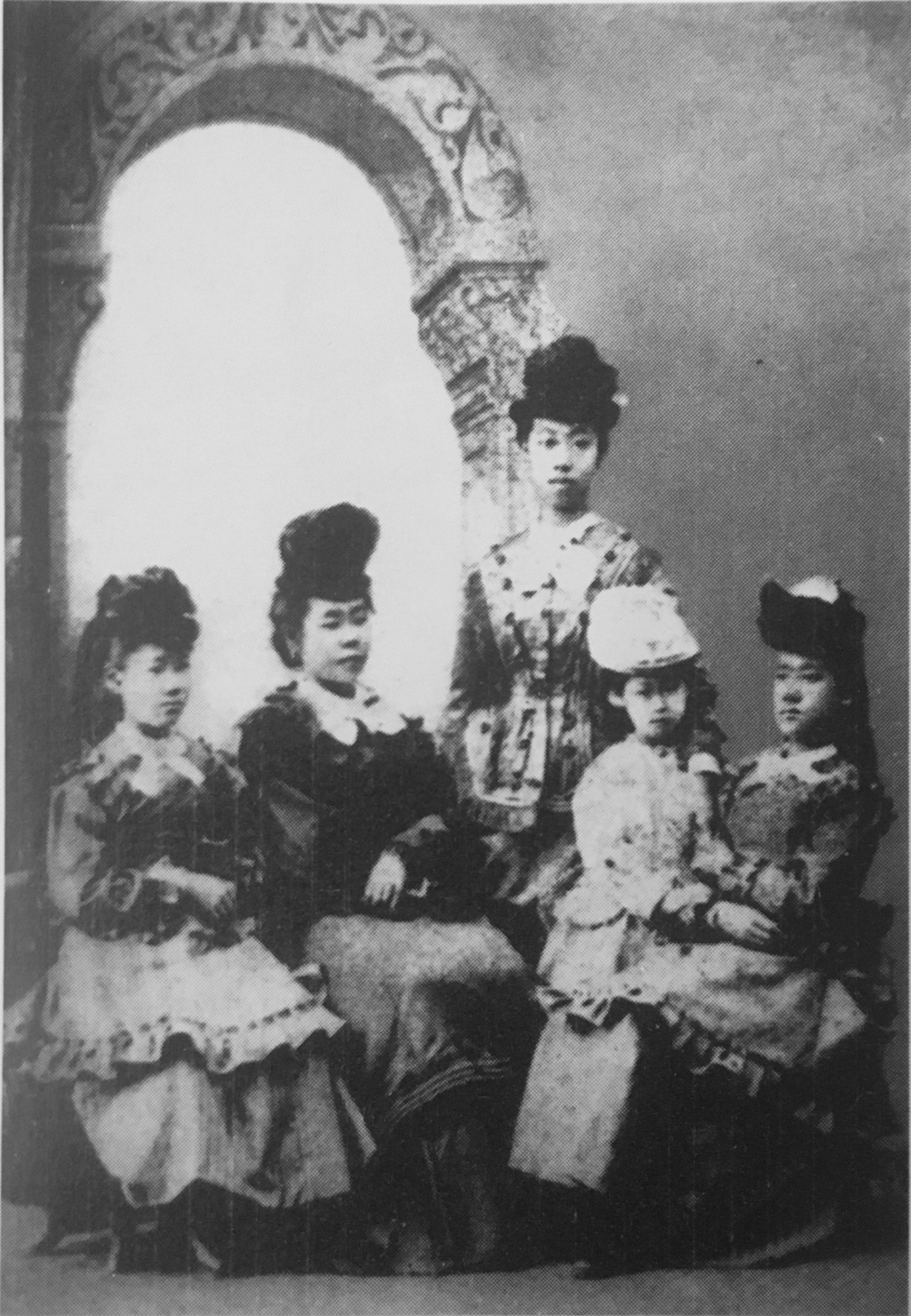
First female study-abroad students from Japan (left to right), Nagai Shige (age 10), Ueda Tei (14), Yoshimasu Ryo (14), Tsuda Ume (6) and Yamakawa Sutematsu (11).

Under Kuroda's sponsorship, Tsuda Ume was volunteered by her father as one of five women members of the Iwakura Mission.

At the age of six, she was also the youngest member of the expedition. She arrived in San Francisco in November 1871 and remained in the United States as a student until she was 18 years old.

Tsuda lived in Washington, D.C. from December 1872 with Charles Lanman (the secretary of the Japanese legation) and his wife Adeline. As they had no children, they welcomed her like their own child. Under the name of Ume Tsuda, she attended the middle-class Georgetown Collegiate School, where she learned English. Upon graduating, she received awards in composition, writing, arithmetic, and deportment. After graduating, she entered the Archer Institute, which catered to the daughters of politicians and bureaucrats. She excelled in languages, math, science, and music, especially the piano. In addition to English, she also studied Latin and French. About one year after arriving in the United States, Tsuda asked to be baptized as a Christian. Although the Lanmans were Episcopalians, they decided she should attend the nonsectarian Old Swedes Church.

== Coming back to Japan ==
By the time Tsuda returned to Japan in 1882, she had almost forgotten Japanese, her native language, which caused temporary difficulties. She also experienced cultural problems adjusting to the inferior position of women in Japanese society. Even her father, Tsuda Sen, who was radically westernized in many ways, was still traditionally patriarchal and authoritarian with regards to women.

Tsuda was hired by Itō Hirobumi, who would soon serve as the first prime minister of Japan, to be a tutor for his children. In 1885, she then began to work in a girls' school for the daughters of the kazoku peerage, known as Peeresses' School, but she was not satisfied by the restriction of educational opportunities to within the peerage and nobility, and she was not satisfied with the school policy that education was intended to polish girls as ladies and train them to be obedient wives and good mothers. She was assisted from 1888 by a friend from her days in America, Alice Bacon. She decided to return to the United States, and after negotiating a two-year leave from the Peeresses’ School won a full scholarship to study at Bryn Mawr College in Philadelphia.

== Second stay in the United States ==
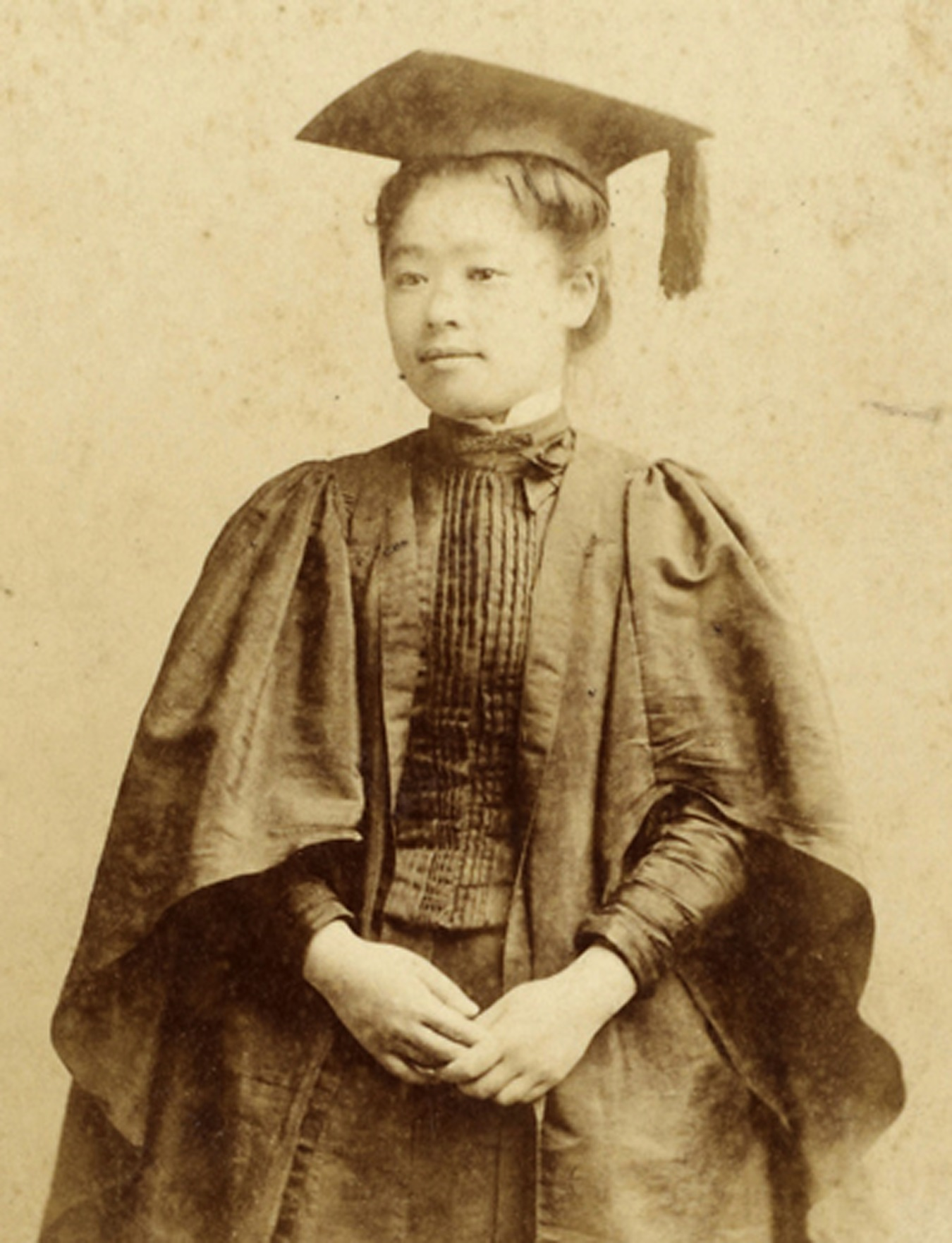
Tsuda Ume (1864–1929) at Bryn Mawr College graduation

Tsuda returned to the United States and enrolled at Bryn Mawr in 1889, where she majored in biology. Her academic advisor was embryologist and head of the Biology Department Thomas Hunt Morgan. After 18 months at Bryn Mawr she spent six months studying education at Oswego Normal School in New York, and then applied for another year's leave from the Peeresses' School, on the condition that she study women's education in the United States.

During her time at Bryn Mawr, she befriended the classicist and expert on ancient Greek civilization, Edith Hamilton, who later visited her in Tokyo in 1916. With T.H. Morgan she undertook a research project on the embryology of the common frog (Rana temporaria) egg; Tsuda's portion of the work took place over the winter of 1891–92, and was written up in 1892. Her joint paper with Morgan was published in 1894 in the Quarterly Journal of Microscopical Science. This is considered the first scientific paper written in English by a Japanese woman.

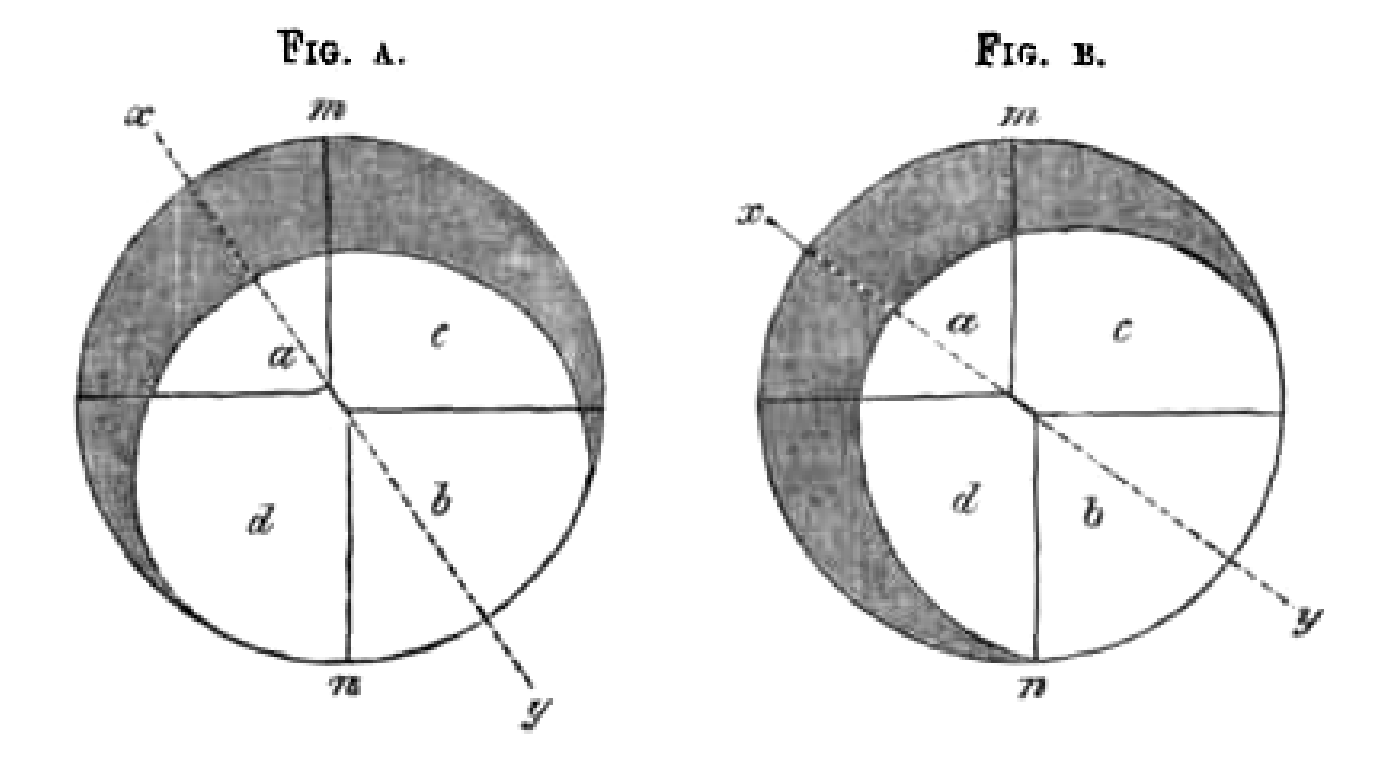
Diagram by Tsuda of the division of a frog's embryo, from Morgan and Tsuda (1894)

During her second stay in the USA, Tsuda decided that other Japanese women should have the opportunity to study overseas as well. She made numerous public speeches about Japanese women's education and raised $8,000 in funds to establish a scholarship for Japanese women.

== Establishment of Tsuda College ==
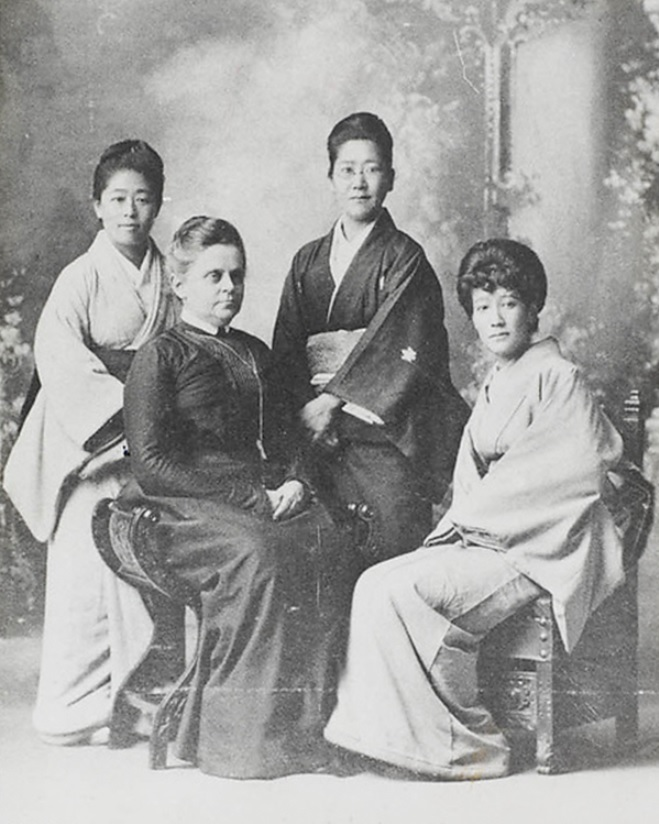
Friends meet again: Tsuda Umeko, Alice Mabel Bacon, Uryū Shigeko, Ōyama Sutematsu (from left to right)

After returning to Japan in 1892, Tsuda Ume once again taught at Peeresses' School, as well as at Tokyo Women's Normal School. Her salary was 800 yen, and her position was the highest one available to women at the time. She published several dissertations and gave speeches advocating for the advancement of women’s status. The 1899 Girls’ Higher Education Law mandated that each prefecture establish at least one public middle school for girls. However, these schools were still unable to offer the same quality of education as that provided in boys’ schools. In 1900, with the help of her friends Princess Ōyama Sutematsu and Alice Bacon, she founded the Joshi Eigaku Juku (女子英学塾, Women's Institute for English Studies) located in Kōjimachi, Tokyo to provide equal opportunity for a liberal arts education for all women regardless of parentage. She later changed her name to Tsuda Umeko in 1902. The school faced a chronic funding shortfall, and Tsuda spent much time fundraising in order to support the school. Due to her enthusiastic efforts, the school gained official recognition in 1903.

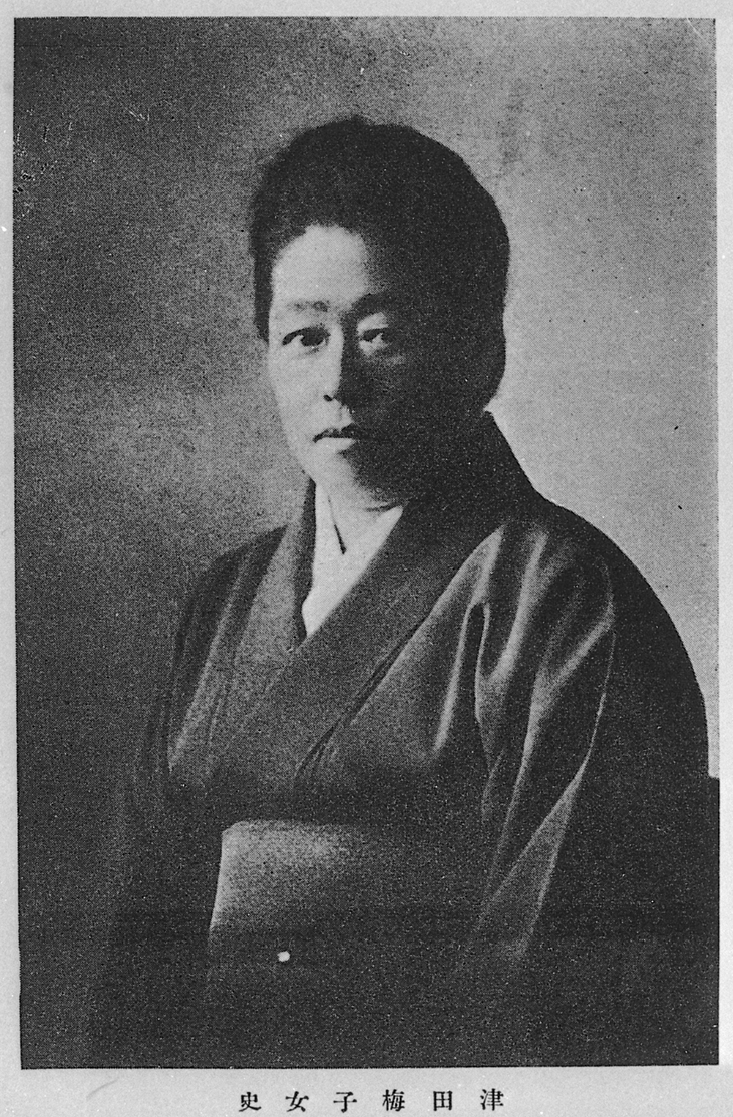
Portrait of Tsuda Umeko

In 1905, Tsuda became the first president of the Japanese branch of the Tokyo YWCA.

== Death ==
Tsuda's busy life eventually undermined her health, and she suffered a stroke. In January 1919, she retired to her summer cottage in Kamakura, where she died after a long illness in 1929 at age 64. Her grave is on the grounds of Tsuda College in Kodaira, Tokyo.

== Legacy ==
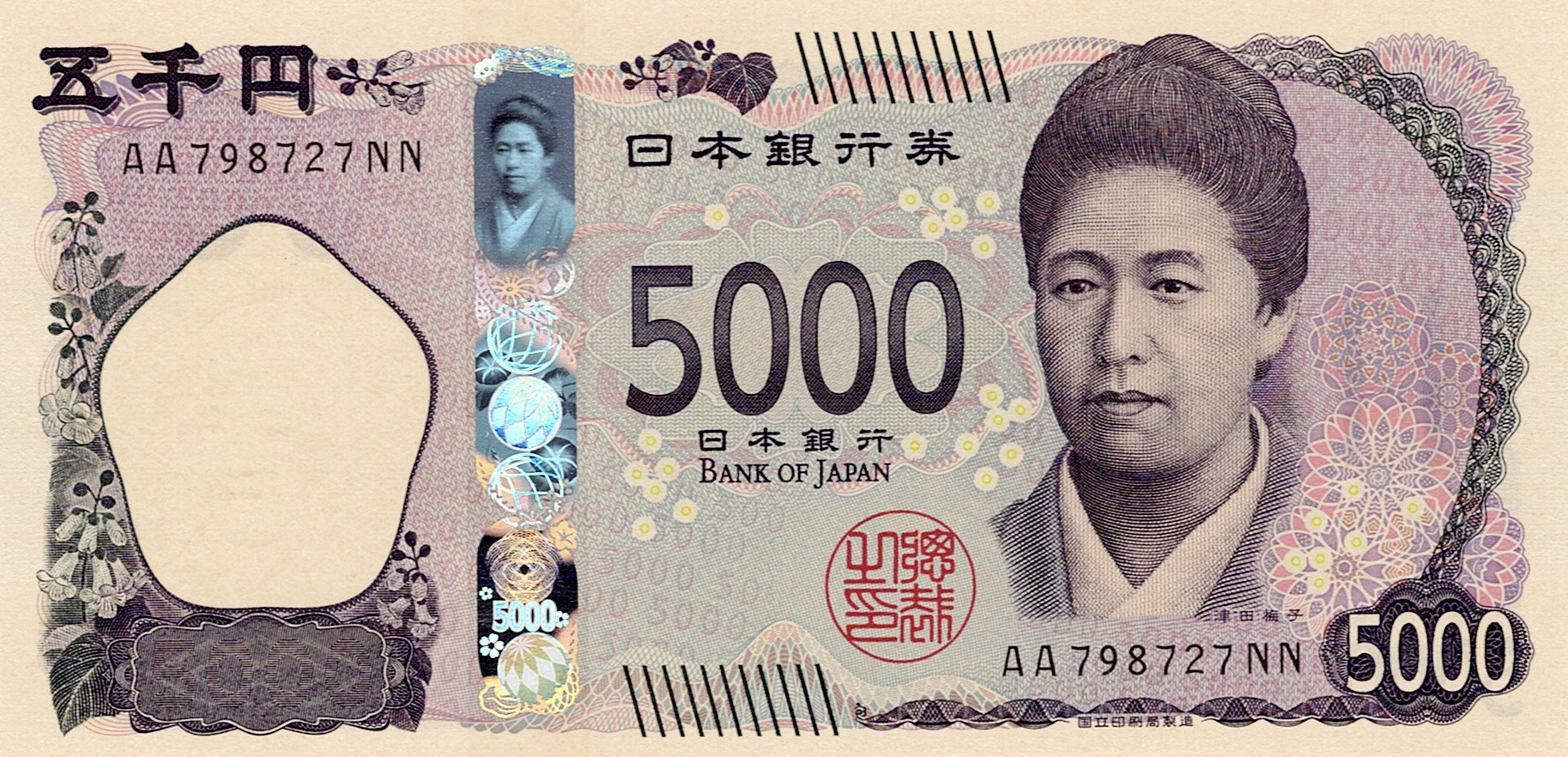
Tsuda Umeko on the ¥5,000 banknote

Joshi Eigaku Juku changed its name to Tsuda Eigaku Juku in 1933 and became Tsuda Daigaku in Japanese and Tsuda College in English after World War II. In 2017, the English name was changed to Tsuda University. It remains one of the most prestigious women's institutes of higher education in Japan.

Although Tsuda strongly desired social reform for women, she did not advocate a feminist social movement, and she opposed the women's suffrage movement. Her activities were based on her philosophy that education should focus on developing individual intelligence and personality.

Tsuda is featured on new Japanese ¥5,000 banknotes issued in 2024.

== See also ==
- Tsuda University
- Ōyama Sutematsu
- Daughters of the Samurai: A Journey from East to West and Back

== Sources ==
- Jansen, Marius B. The Making of Modern Japan. Cambridge: Harvard University Press, 2000. ISBN 9780674003347; OCLC 44090600
- Nimura, Janice P. (2015). Daughters of the Samurai: A Journey from East to West and Back. New York. ISBN 978-0-393-07799-5. OCLC 891611002.
- Nussbaum, Louis-Frédéric and Käthe Roth. (2005). Japan encyclopedia. Cambridge: Harvard University Press. ISBN 978-0-674-01753-5; OCLC 58053128
- Rose, Barbara. Tsuda Umeko and Women's Education in Japan. New Haven, CT: Yale University Press, 1992. ISBN 0-300-05177-8
