= List of Japanese dissidents in Imperial Japan =

This list contains the names of Japanese dissidents in Imperial Japan, which lasted from the Meiji period (1868-1912) to the end of World War II. The list includes, but not limited to, communists, anarchists, and religious dissidents.

== A ==
- Kazuo Aoyama, a communist

== D ==
- Taisen Deshimaru, a buddhist teacher

== H ==
- Teru Hasegawa, an esperantist

== I ==
- Shoichi Ichikawa, a Japanese Communist Party member
- Yuki Ikeda
- Ayako Ishigaki, a journalist
- Noe Itō

== K ==
- Wataru Kaji, a writer
- Shigeo Kamiyama, a Japanese Communist Party member
- Fumiko Kaneko, a pre-Shōwa period assassin
- Sen Katayama, founding member of the Japanese Communist Party
- Takiji Kobayashi, an author of proletarian literature
- Shūsui Kōtoku, a Japanese anarchist
- Tokuda Kyuichi

== M ==
- Kenji Miyamoto, Japanese Communist Party member

== N ==
- Daisuke Nanba, pre-Shōwa period assassin
- Eitaro Noro, Japanese Communist Party member
- Sanzō Nosaka, Japanese Communist Party leader

== O ==
- George Ohsawa, pacifist
- Shigeki Oka, socialist
- Sakae Ōsugi, anarchist

== S ==
- Yoshio Shiga

== T ==
- Makoto Tomioka, anarchist

== Y ==
- Mitsu Yashima, artist, and wife of Taro Yashima
- Taro Yashima, artist

== See also ==
- Japanese dissidence during the Shōwa period
