= Japanese resistance =

Japanese resistance can refer to:

- Political dissidence in the Empire of Japan
- Dissent in the Armed Forces of the Empire of Japan
- Japanese in the Chinese resistance to the Empire of Japan
  - Japanese People's Emancipation League
  - Japanese People's Anti-war Alliance
  - League to Raise the Political Consciousness of Japanese Troops
- Japanese holdouts, Japanese soldiers who continued fighting after Japan’s surrender in World War II
- Volunteer Fighting Corps, planned civil defence units
