= Wataru Kaji =

Japanese writer and activist (1903–1982)

- 鹿地 亘
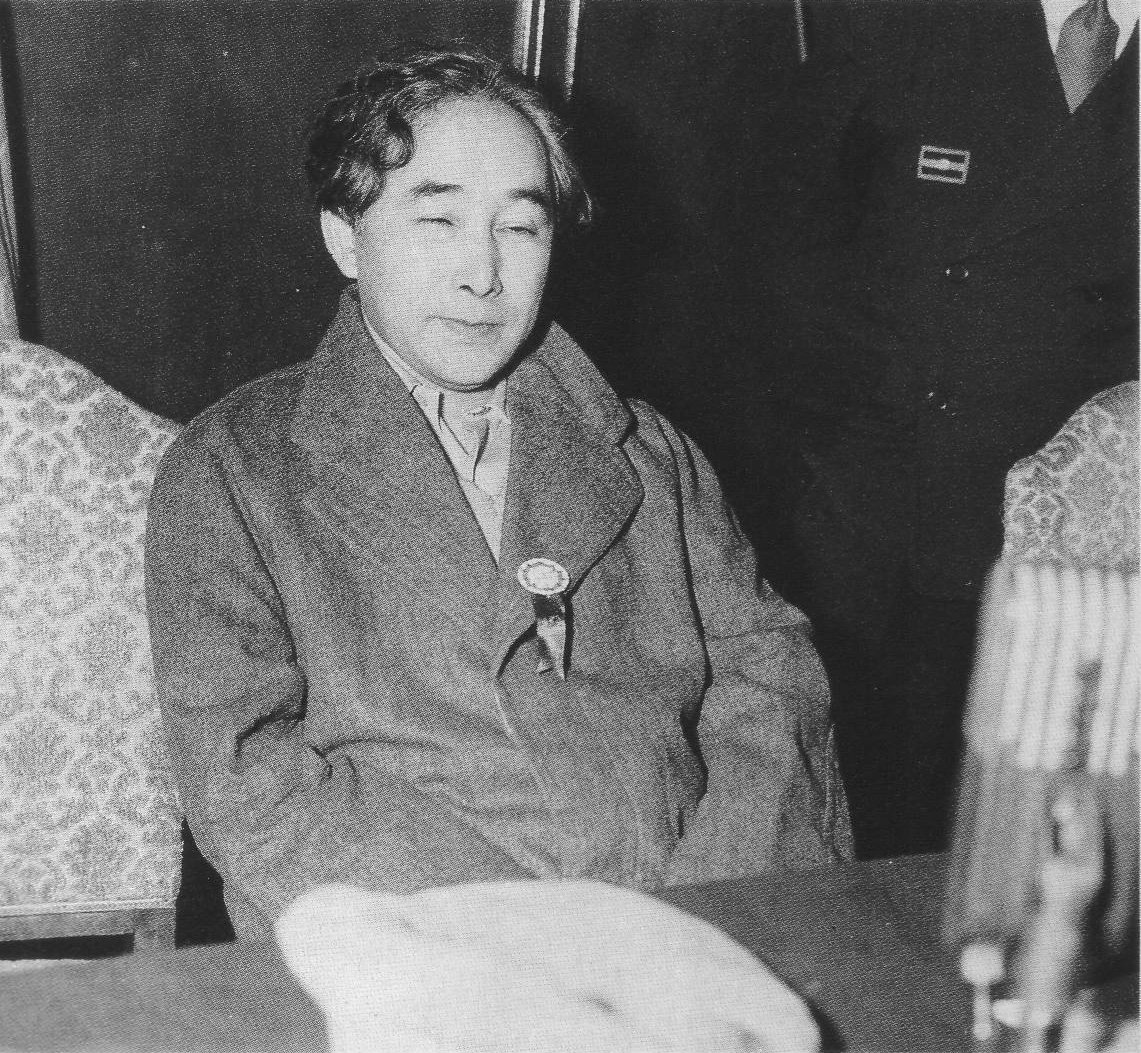
- Wataru Kaji in 1952
- Born: Mitsugi Seguchi; May 1, 1903; Misaki, Nishikunisaki District, Empire of Japan
- Died: July 26, 1982 (aged 79); Usa, Japan
- Education: Tokyo Imperial University
- Political party: Japanese Communist Party
- Spouse: Yuki Ikeda

Wataru Kaji (鹿地 亘, Kaji Wataru; 1 May 1903 – 26/27 July 1982) was the nom de guerre for Mitsugi Seguchi (瀬口 貢, Seguchi Mitsugi), a Japanese writer, literary critic, and political activist.

During his lifetime, he worked as an anti-militarist activist in pre-war Japan, and, after the outbreak of World War II, joined the Chinese resistance to Imperial Japan. After the war, he would be kidnapped and tortured by US intelligence under suspicion of being a Soviet spy.

== Biography ==
Wataru Kaji was born in the village of Misaki in what was then Nishikunisaki District, Ōita (today part of Bungotakada) in 1903. However, another claim pinpoints his birthplace in Kyushu. Born into a family of prosperous landlords, Kaji could trace his lineage back to the Satsuma clan. In his youth, he wanted to be a naval officer. However, when he entered Tokyo Imperial University in 1923, he devoted himself to literature. It was during this period that he became involved with activism. His first organizing activity was boycotting any class that Prince Yamanashi attended. A member of the Royal Family, he was given preferential treatment compared to his classmates.

After graduating, Kaji Wataru was arrested several times for his political activism. He was arrested in 1930 for being a member of the Anti-Imperialist League. While in custody, the police beat him across the legs for two hours every day for a month. He would eventually be released, but would continue to be arrested periodically. In 1932, he joined the Japanese Communist Party.

In 1933, Kaji was arrested for the third time because his card was found among the effects of his best friend, Takiji Kobayashi, the celebrated writer who was tortured to death by the authorities. In 1934, Kaji was charged with violating the Peace Preservation Law and threatening the Kokutai, being jailed for around a year He would not be released until November 1935. When he emerged from prison unexpectedly, he realized that he had been released only because the police hoped he would lead them to fellow cadres. For several months, he lived in isolation. Fearing re-arrest.

He fled to China in January 1936, disguising himself as a samurai actor in a traveling drama company. The authorities would eventually discover his new location. However, he was protected by the famed writer Lu Xun, who informed the authorities that Kaji had come to China solely to study Chinese literature. Kaji had developed a close rapport with Lu Xun while in China. and even served as a Japanese translator for Lu Xun's work. However, Kaji couldn't read Chinese at the time. So he had to seek help from a Japanese journalist who was more fluent. After Lu Xun died in 1936, Kaji Wataru would be the only foreigner who served as pallbearer at Lu Xun's funeral.

Wataru Kaji made friends with several figures within the city. Including the writer Hu Feng of the League of Left-Wing writers. As well as the writer Xiao Hong, Kaji had also met Communist Party member Max Granich who, following the outbreak of the Second-Sino Japanese war, advised that Kaji should focus his attention on Japanese POWs, which he based on the news of the CCP’s capture of many Japanese POWs after the Battle of Pingxingguan. In Shanghai, Wataru Kaji married Yuki Ikeda, also known as Sachiko Ikeda, a fellow Japanese dissident who had fled Japan before the war.

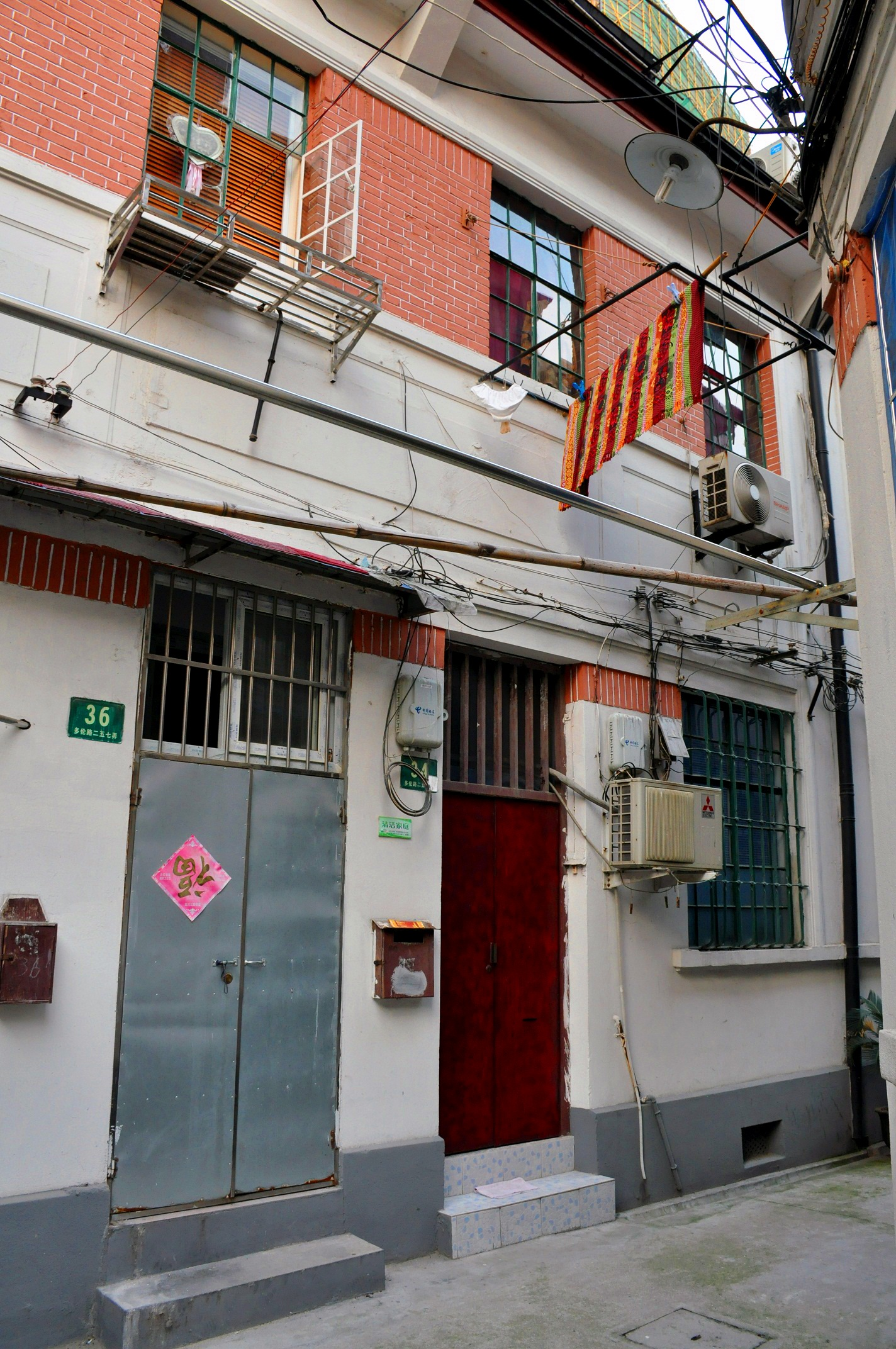
Yanshan Village. Kaji Wataru's former residence in the Hongkou district of Shanghai, before WWII.

When war broke out in July 1937, Kaji and his wife fled to the French Concession. Having almost been nabbed by the Japanese authorities. Kaji wanted to join the Chinese in their war against Imperial Japan, but was rejected. The Chinese believing his pleas for collaboration was a mere "Japanese ruse". In addition, while in Shanghai, Kaji had been placed under suspicion for working with Japanese socialists by Chiang Kai-shek's Nationalist government.

The couple would find themselves stranded in the French Concession. Japanese authorities were surveilling their activities and demanding that the local French authorities extradite the two. Kaji and his wife were planning to commit suicide before, at the last minute, Rewi Alley intervened. Securing their safe passage into Hong Kong. Where they were given shelter by the Chinese artist Huang Xinbo. Yuki and Kaji spent four months in Hong Kong where they were surveilled and threatened by the Japanese secret service. While in the city, Kaji would write articles for Chinese newspapers and magazines.

Kaji and his wife in Hankow c. 1938

In March 1938, Kaji and Yuki would be smuggled into Hankow. Almost being nabbed a second time by the Japanese. That same month, Kaji Wataru attended a meeting in Hankow of Chinese Literary leaders where he denounced the Japanese invasion of China. The American journalist Edgar Snow would interview the couple during his stay in the city. His encounters with "China's Japanese friends" would be a subject of his book "Battle For Asia". A sequel to Red Star over China.

Kaji Wataru wrote the Japanese introduction of the book What War Means by Harold Timperley. Published in 1938, What War Means chronicles the Nanjing Massacre. In the introduction, Kaji expressed that he was not surprised to learn of the massacre, saying it was a result of Japan's aggressive foreign policies since the early 1930s. Eleven copies of What War Means were confiscated by Japanese authorities from an American missionary who had been distributing this work throughout Japan in 1939.

Photo of Kaji (left of back row) Sachiko Ikeda (middle of front row) Teru Hasegawa (AKA Green River Eiko) (left of front row) and Feng Naichao (冯乃超) (right of front row)

Kaji was attached to the propaganda section of the Chinese Army Political Department under Kuo Mo-jo. Serving as "psychological adviser" to the section, which was staffed with scores of Japanese-educated Chinese. Tasked with writing propaganda for distribution amongst Japanese soldiers and civilians. According to Andrew Roth, Kaji had his hand in "everything", including leaflets which Chinese Airplanes dropped on Japan in 1938. The only instance of the Chinese Air Force dropping leaflets on the home islands. In response, the Japanese bombed the political department, nearly killing Kaji and his wife.

In Hankow, and later in Chongqing, Kaji and his wife would be involved with the re-education of Japanese POWs. He founded the Japanese People's Anti-war Alliance in December 1939. An organization made up of defectors from the Japanese Army. Many of them having been recruited from Peace Village, a POW camp in Guizhou Province known for its humane treatment. They would be sent to the Guangxi front that same year. Broadcasting anti-war propaganda to Japanese troops. Their exploits during the Battle of Kunlun had even reached the Australian Press. During his service in the Chinese resistance, Wataru Kaji coined the term ‘verbal bullets’ (kotoba no dangan) or ‘voice bullets’ (koe no dangan) concerning his loudspeaker propaganda operations against Japanese soldiers on the front. Verbal bullets were meant to ‘fire at the hearts of the soldiers’. Used to agitate the Japanese soldiers into a state of mutiny.

The Anti-War League was disbanded in 1941 due to a breakdown in relations between the Kuomintang and Communist Party and a subsequent increase in suspicion of leftists by the Nationalists. Kazuo Aoyama, a fellow dissident, would replace Kaji as psychological advisor for the Chinese Army. Their relationship would deteriorate over the years, with Kazuo being more favored by the Nationalists compared to Kaji. Despite Kazuo openly proclaiming himself a communist. According to Koji Ariyoshi, a Nisei military observer stationed in Chongqing, Kaji would be surveilled by Dai Li agents wherever he went. Still, Kaji continued to work as a propagandist for the Chinese government.

In 1945, during Mao Zedong's visit to Chongqing for negotiations with Chiang Kai-shek, Mao, accompanied by Zhou Enlai, met with Wataru and his wife. It was reported that Mao Zedong thanked them for their "special contribution to the Chinese people's sacred war of resistance". John Young, a member of the Ministry of Affairs of China, acted as interpreter.

In 1946, Kaji Wataru's two manuscripts "We Are Seven" and "Letters from the Front" were published in book form by the New York Japanese American Committee for Democracy. It was a "record of the first group of Japanese to fight for peace and democracy in China". The book tells the growth and propaganda work in Central China of the Japanese Anti-War League. The book was a limited edition with 1,000 copies published. Japanese dissident Taro Yashima designed the book cover.

=== Contacts with U.S. intelligence ===
By 1942, he had begun occasionally working in association with the United States Office of War Information. In April 1945, the U.S. Office of Strategic Services (OSS) requested that the Chinese government release Kaji from his work there to allow him to work for the OSS in setting up a POW re-education camp Kunming, which was granted. Kaji, however, was unwilling to give up his operational independence in full. In response, the OSS said it would "make no guarantees" but "would not hinder" his larger work with his group, the League for the Establishment of a Democratic Japan, an offshoot of the Japanese People's Anti-war Alliance that sought "the ultimate liberation of Japanese society from authoritarian political oppression and ... industrial capitalist exploitation" so long as the work's sponsorship was not traceable back to the OSS. Negotiations and dialogue collapsed after Kaji objected to several points in the contract sent to him, including a demand for an oath of loyalty from him and his wife, and that the OSS reserved the right to terminate the agreement at any point.

=== Kidnapping by U.S. intelligence ===
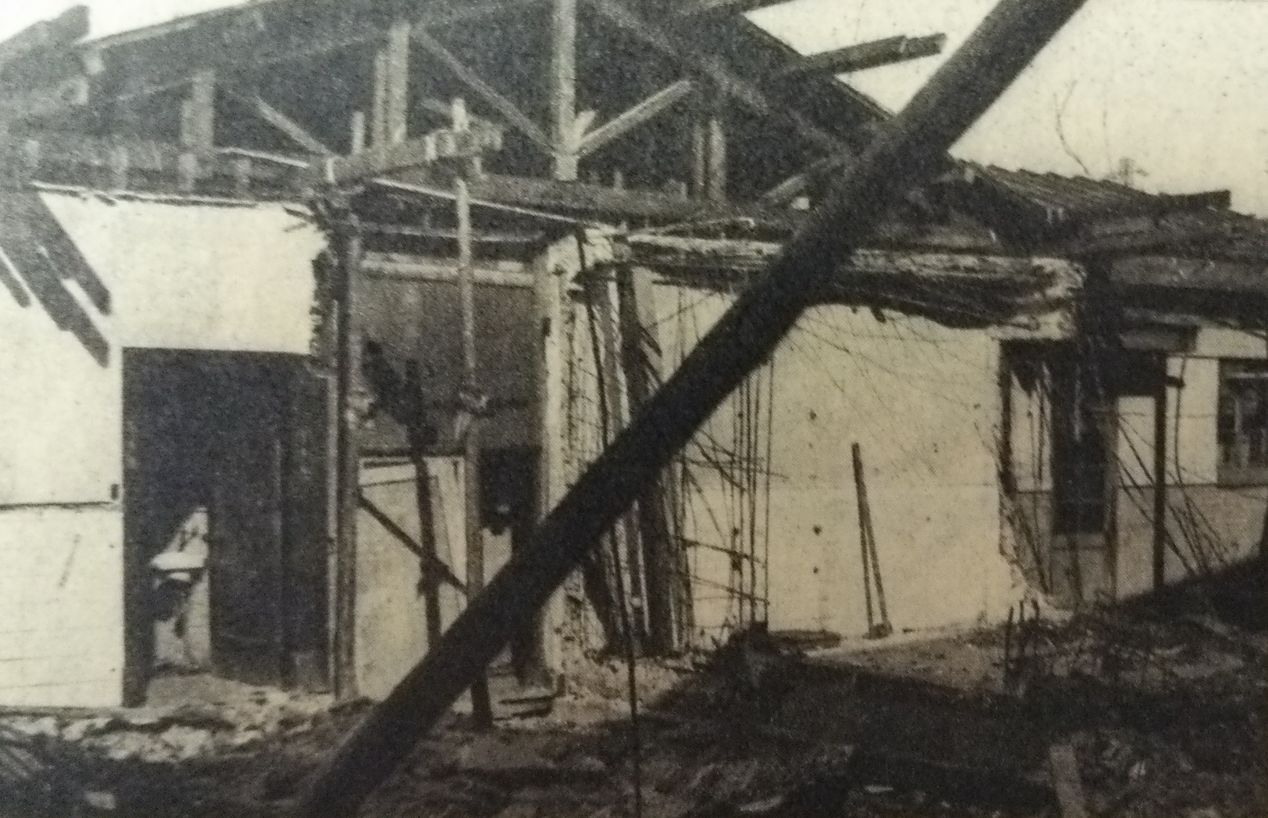
House where US intelligence imprisoned Kaji Wataru. Circa. 1953

On 25 November 1951, Kaji was kidnapped by the Z-Unit (a black operations under Lt. Col Jack Canon), in what is today the city of Fujisawa, Kanagawa, and was held for more than a year in several locations. According to Kaji, he was subjected to intense interrogation and torture, and was accused of being a spy for the Soviet Union, which he denied. He was given a demand to become a double agent for the United States, which he refused. Kaji attempted suicide via consumption of household cleaner on 29 November. The attempt failed, and his captors administered medical aid to both assist his recovery from the attempt, and from a persistent case of tuberculosis. After a Japanese-American officer in the Unit leaked a few details about Kaji's detention to the Tokyo press in September 1952, the leaker, as well as another Japanese-American officer who developed sympathy for Kaji, attempted to secure his release, first on 24 November informing Kōzō Inomata, a member of the National Diet for the JSP, who then notified police. One of the officers also made a formal public statement about what he had seen, followed shortly thereafter by a press conference involving Inomata, another officer, and Kaji's immediate family. On 7 December 1952, Kaji was released. He alleged that his capture was due at least in part to his refusal to work with the OSS under their conditions at the end of World War II.

U.S. sources at the time, including the Embassy of the United States in Tokyo, disputed this account, with a statement issued on 15 December saying Kaji admitted to being "an active Communist intelligence agent" after his capture, and that he had concocted the story of being kidnapped due to a possible threat against his life from his superiors. They also claimed that after the end of the Allied-occupation of Japan in late April 1952, Kaji was under U.S. protection at his own request, as anything else would have been a violation of Japan's sovereignty following the withdrawal of foreign troops. After another man (a former double agent for the U.S. Counterintelligence Corps (CIC) communicating with the Soviet Union until the end of the occupation) was arrested by Japanese police for sending radio signals to the Soviet Union on 10 December, he had claimed Kaji was a member of the same spy ring, which Kaji denied. The U.S. cited this event as further evidence for their claims. Ultimately, both the double agent and Kaji were charged with sending sensitive information to Moscow. The former was put on trial and convicted in March 1953, with Kaji's trial delayed due to ongoing health issues. Kaji was found guilty in 1961 and given a mild suspended sentence, but was acquitted on appeal in 1969 due to lack of evidence. Details later emerged that Kaji was under surveillance by the U.S. prior to the other man becoming a double agent for the CIC, meaning that intelligence from him could not have been evidence proving the U.S. claim. Additionally, U.S. response intended to assassinate the character of Kaji, painting him as a likely traitor due to his actions opposing the Japanese government during World War II, as well as shore up the incumbent pro-American government in Japan headed by Prime Minister Shigeru Yoshida, which may have been destabilized should the true facts of the case have become known. It was also revealed that the kidnapping occurred without formal authorization by CIC senior leaders, and that shortly after the event, the CIC realized that Kaji knew little that would help them with regard to the Soviet Union following vague suspicions about his ties.

== Legacy ==
The Chinese documentary series Today in the History of Anti-Japanese War dedicated an episode to Kaji.

Wataru Kaji was featured in the International Friends During the Anti-Japanese War, an exhibition organized by the Beijing People's Association for Friendship with Foreign Countries. The show "features 160 pictures of 39 foreign friends who worked together with the Chinese people and made contributions to China's independence and freedom."

A statue of Kaji Wataru was erected in Jianchuan Museum.

== See also ==
- Teru Hasegawa
- Japanese dissidence during the Shōwa period
- Japanese in the Chinese resistance to the Empire of Japan
- Japanese People's Anti-war Alliance

== Works ==
- Wataru Kaji (1948). Ten Years in China. Jiji Press.
