= Japanese in the Chinese resistance to the Empire of Japan =

Throughout the Second Sino-Japanese War (1937–1945), Japanese political dissidents and Japanese prisoners of war (POWs) joined the Chinese in the war against the Empire of Japan.

== Background ==
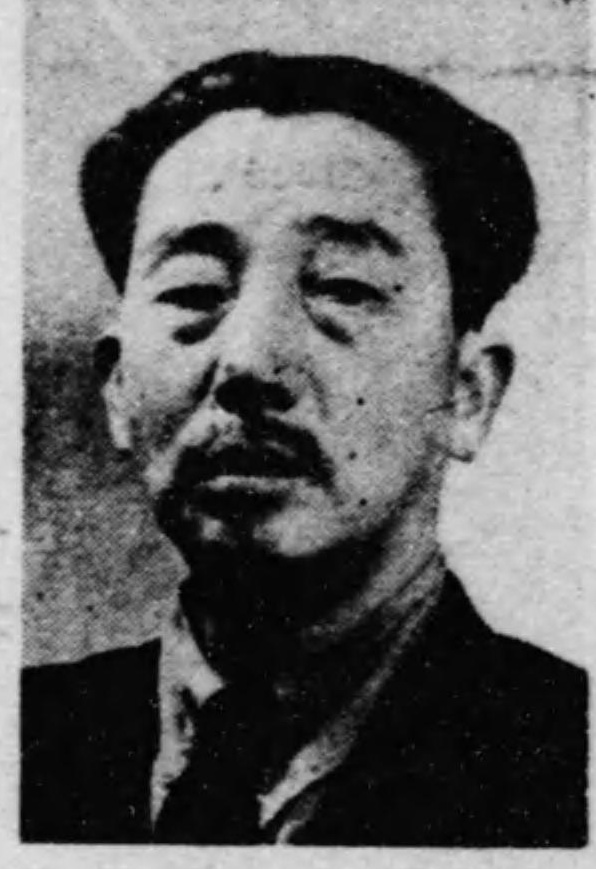
Sanzo Nosaka, founder of the Japanese People's Emancipation League, and the Japanese Communist Party.

The seeds of Japanese collaboration with the Chinese resistance can be traced back to the Japanese Invasion of Manchuria in 1931.

Following the Japanese Invasion of Manchuria, the Japanese Communist Party launched an anti-war campaign against the Japanese government. The JCP infiltrated the military and distributed leaflets, and newspapers opposing the war. Sakaguchi Kiichiro, a Japanese Communist party member, and sailor in the Japanese military, founded the anti-war "The Soaring Mast" in response to the invasion. Six issues were distributed until Sakaguchi's arrest, torture, and eventual death at the hands of the Japanese authorities. Overall, the JCP's anti-war campaign was met with little success.

In 1933, following the invasion of Manchuria, JCP leader Nosaka Sanzo (under the alias Okano) called for the Japanese people to launch an anti-war campaign against the Japanese Government in a speech at the 13th Plenum of the Executive Committee of the Communist International.

Nosaka Sanzo would join the Chinese Communist resistance in their war against Japan following the outbreak of the Second Sino-Japanese war.

== Second Sino-Japanese War ==
War would break out between China, and Japan on 7 July 1937.

According to Xiaoyuan Liu, During the Sino-Japanese war, the leadership of the CCP always believed that a worldwide antifascist front and national anti-Japanese front in China must be supplemented by an anti-war front among the Japanese people. Mao Zedong was quoted saying that "The Japanese Revolution will occur after the first severe defeats suffered by the Japanese Army." Only after Nosaka Sanzo's arrival in Yanan in 1940 was the CCP leadership able to find an effective bridge to reach the Japanese people.

In February 1938, the Nationalist government established a POW camp in Changde, Hunan named "Peace Village". A name given by Japanese anti-war activist Kaji Wataru. Due to Peace Village's proximity to the front lines, the POW camp was relocated to Zhenyuan County, Guizhou Province, in March 1939. The camp gained a reputation for its humane treatment of prisoners. Although the prison camp was originally intended for 500 prisoners, it ultimately held over 600, making it the largest prisoner camp during the war. The camp would become a recruitment pool for the Japanese People's Anti-War League.

Following the outbreak of war Japanese Communist Party Leader Sanzo Nosaka would join the Chinese Communists in Yenan in 1940. Kaji Wataru, another Japanese communist, would join the Chinese Nationalists in Chongqing in 1938. Their role was to reeducate Japanese POWs on behalf of the Chinese resistance. However, by the time they both arrived in "Free China", the Chinese communists were already "reeducating" Japanese POWs.

The education of Japanese captives by the Eighth Route Army began in 1938. In November 1940, the Peasants' and Workers' School was established. It reeducated Japanese POWs who afterward became involved in propaganda.

The first Japanese to join the Eighth Route Army during the Second Sino-Japanese War was Maeda Mitsushige. Other Japanese POWs, who attended the School, would follow in Maeda's footsteps and join the Eighth Route Army during the war.

Several organizations emerged during the war. The Anti-War League, the Japanese People's Emancipation League and a communist league.

An IJNAF A5M fighter pilot who was shot down on 26 September 1937, had along with other captured Japanese combatants, become convinced to join the Chinese side, and helped the Chinese break Japanese tactical codes and other information that provided a huge intelligence windfall for the newly established cryptanalyst unit headed by Dr. Chang Chao-hsi.

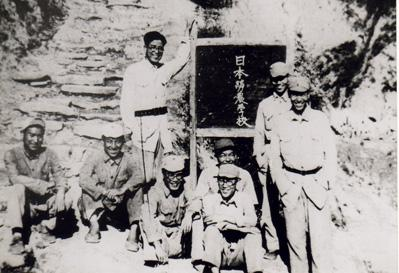
Students of the Peasants' and Workers' school.

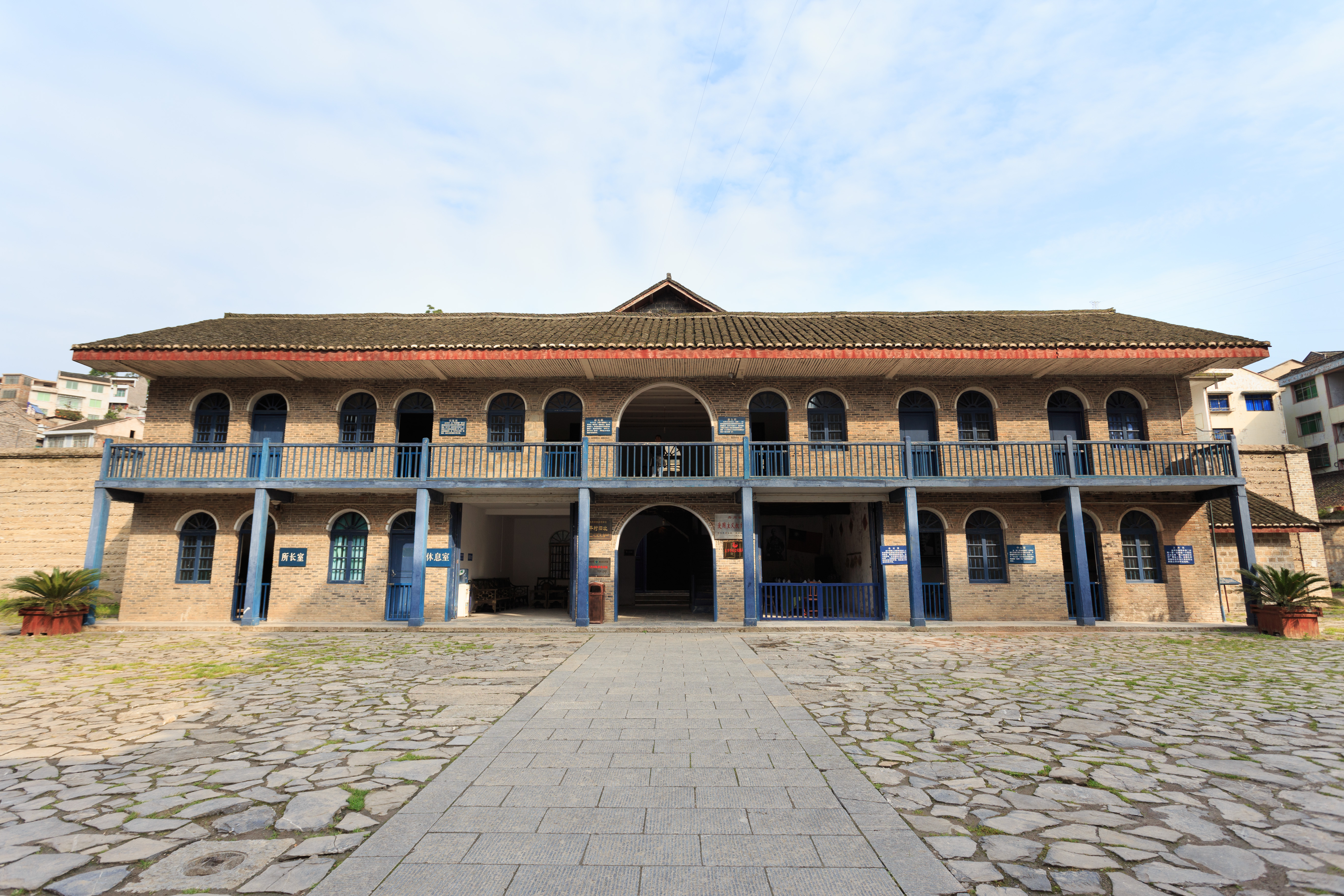
Site of Peace Village. A POW camp in Guizhou Province that held Japanese POWs. The Japanese People's Anti-War League recruited members from this camp.

== Post-war ==
Many Japanese POWs who joined the Chinese resistance had planned to stay in China after the war. Kobayashi Kancho, a Japanese POW who joined the Eighth Route Army during the war, stayed in China, where he worked at the foreign affairs office, and later the People's Hospital in Fengzhen. Mitsushige Maeda worked in an aviation school in northeastern China. Shigeo Tsutsui, a Japanese POW who joined the Japanese People's Emancipation League during the Second Sino-Japanese War, stayed in China after the war, and helped found the Chinese People's Liberation Army's first flying school. Kiyoshi Kobayashi, a Japanese soldier who defected to the Eight Route Army during the war, chose to stay in China. He married a Chinese woman and bore a son, dying in Tianjin in 1994.

Those who returned to Japan faced discrimination. Mitsushige Maeda returned to Japan in 1958. Upon his return he faced difficulty finding a proper job in Japan due to him being considered pro-communist. He had to do part-time jobs to support his family. According to Hu Zhenjiang, a Chinese researcher on the topic of Japanese in the Eighth Route Army during WW2, he discovered Maeda to be cleaning parks for a living at the age of 89.

In addition, there were cases of Japanese in the Chinese resistance who were put under surveillance by the Japanese authorities after the war. Including Maeda Mitsushige following his return to Japan. As well as Kancho Kobayashi who returned to Japan in 1955.

Those who collaborated with the United States in China during WW2 would find themselves being persecuted by them during the Cold War. Kaji Wataru, who had collaborated with the OSS during WW2, would be kidnapped and tortured by the CIA on suspicion of being a Soviet agent. In 1951, Nosaka Sanzo would be one of the victims of Douglas Macarthur's Post-War Red Purge in Japan.

== Legacy ==
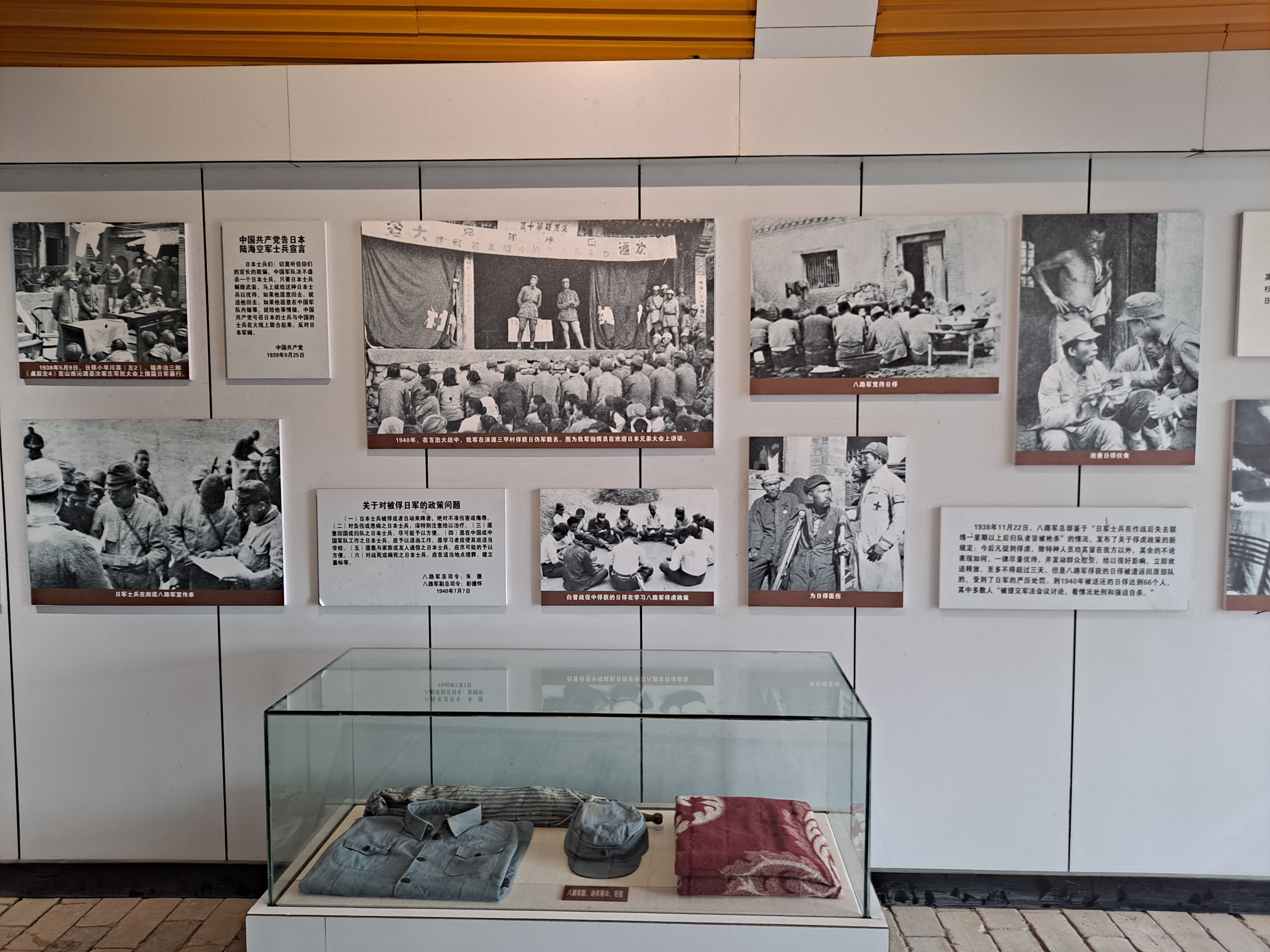
Museum of the Peasants and Worker's School.

A tombstone for Hideo Miyagawa, a Japanese soldier who served in the Eighth Route Army during WW2, is placed in the East China Martyr's cemetery. His tombstone reads "Hideo Miyagawa--Japanese anti-war fighter". However, there is no picture, epitaph, nor his birth and death dates on the stone. Hideo Miyagawa was among the 300 honored in the "69th anniversary of China's victory in the anti-Japanese war." by China's The Ministry of Civil Affairs in 2014.

In September 2015, General Secretary of the Chinese Communist Party Xi Jinping granted medals to 10 "international anti-fascist fighters who fought for China WW2." Kobayashi Kancho, a Japanese soldier who served in the Eighth Route Army during the war, was one of 10 who received a medal in Beijing.

In 1984, Mitsushige Maeda, and another Japanese veteran Takashi Kagawa, coauthored and published a book titled "Japanese Soldiers of the Eighth Route Army.". It concerns there experiences in the Eight Route Army during WW2.

Statues of Sanzo Nosaka, and Kaji Wataru were erected on the grounds of Jianchuan Museum. Along with other foreign volunteers in the Second Sino-Japanese War. The statues of Nosaka and Wataru were commissioned by Cai Wei, Associate Professor of Sculpture at the Chengdu Academy of Fine Arts, Sichuan Conservatory of Music.

Peace Village was selected into the National List of Anti-Japanese War Memorial Facilities and Sites.

== Research ==
In 2004, the history research office of the Hubei Provincial Committee of the Chinese Communist Party set up a research team to study and document the history of Japanese in the Eighth Route Army during the Second Sino-Japanese War.

== List of Japanese in the Chinese resistance ==
- Teru Hasegawa
- Shigeo Tsutsui
- Yuki Ikeda
- Kazuo Aoyama

== List of Organizations ==
- Japanese People's Emancipation League
- Japanese People's Anti-War League

== See also ==
- Japanese dissidence during the early Shōwa period
