= Kazuo Aoyama =

20th-century Japanese communist rebel

- Occupation: political activist (communism)

Kazuo Aoyama (靑山 和夫, Aoyama Kazuo)(real name Kuroda Zenji) was a Japanese communist who joined the Republic of China during the Second Sino-Japanese War.

== Childhood ==
According to journalist Edgar Snow, Aoyama was born an Orphan. He was eventually adopted by a family who put him to work at age five. At age 16 he went to work in a factory.

== Political Activity in Japan and flight to China ==
At some point Kazuo served in the "rank and file" of the labor movement in Japan, organizing unions in Japan's heavy industries. Before the war broke out he was sent to Shanghai on a "Special Mission." He then attached himself to the Chinese Army. In Nanjing, he worked in the political department. By age 40 he was described to have become a leader in the "Japanese revolutionary movement" while operating in wartime China.

In Hankow, he was a political advisor for a Korean Volunteer corps. Kazuo would attempt to raise an army of 70 Koreans in China to be deployed to Wuhan. The Nationalist government accepted Aoyama's plan. By October 10, 1938, a Korean Volunteer Corps was founded in Hankou on October 10, 1938. It was the first Korean armed unit organized in China. The Korean Volunteer corps were related to an international volunteer corps formation plan proposed by Kazuo Aoyama to the Nationalist Government. This international volunteer corps would be modeled after the antifascist international volunteer army in Spain. In 1938, he established the Gokutō hanfassho dōmei [Far East Antifascist League] and met Kaji Wataru, and Kim Yaksan (Kim Won-bong, 1898–1958), to discuss the formation of a popular front organization.

Kazuo wrote the Japanese introduction of the book What War Means by Harold Timperley. Published in 1938, What War Means chronicles the Nanjing Massacre. 11 copies of What War Means were confiscated by the Japanese authorities from an American missionary who had been distributing this work throughout Japan in 1939.

Aoyama was on good terms with the anti-communist Kuomintang, despite openly labeling himself a Communist himself. In contrast to Kaji Wataru, a fellow left wing dissident in Chongqing who founded the Japanese People's Anti-War League. Aoyama could freely operate in Chongqing, unlike Kaji who was closely monitored by the Dai Li secret service. The relationship between Kaji, and Aoyama deteriorated by the time the U.S. Army arrived in Chongqing. Koji Ariyoshi, a nisei soldier in the U.S. Army was personally approached by Kaji Wataru to help mend the relationship back together, but ultimately ended in failure. Aoyama would eventually replace Wataru Kaji as a "psychological advisor", re-educating captured Japanese soldiers, following Kaji's fallout with the Kuomintang government.

In Chongqing, Aoyama operated a printing plant with facilities for Japanese typography that the central government of China, the Office of War Information (OWI), and the British used. He sold the printing plant to the OWI during the war.

== See also ==
- Japanese dissidence during the Shōwa period
- Japanese in the Chinese resistance to the Empire of Japan
- Japanese People's Emancipation League
