= Dissent in the Armed Forces of the Empire of Japan =

Dissent in the Armed Forces of the Empire of Japan refers to serious cases of military insubordination within the institution, from the founding of the Empire of Japan in 1868 to its defeat during World War II in 1945.

On 26 February 1936, a group of young radical Japanese Army officers led an attempted coup d'etat in Japan.

Between 1929 and 1942, there were several acts of Communist subversion within the military. During the Second Sino-Japanese War, hundreds of Japanese soldiers defected to the Chinese resistance to Japan and became resistance activists.

== Notable dissenters ==
- Sakaguchi Kiichiro
- Shigeo Tsutsui

== See also ==
- Political dissidence in the Empire of Japan
