= Sakaguchi Kiichiro =

Japanese writer and activist (1903–1982)

- 阪口喜一郎
- Born: January , 1902; Izumi, Osaka, Japan
- Died: December , 1933; Hiroshima, Hiroshima Prefecture, Japan
- Political party: Japanese Communist Party
- Spouse: Umeko

Sakaguchi Kiichiro (阪口喜一郎, Kiichiro Sakaguchi; January 1902 – December 1933) was a Japanese anti-war activist and a sailor in the Imperial Japanese Navy. During his service, he was active in anti-war activity.

== Early life ==
Sakaguchi Kiichiro was born in January 1902 in Izumi, Osaka Prefecture. After graduating from high school, he joined the Marine Corps. In 1930, he organized the Social Science Research Society within the Navy. At some point he married a woman named Umeko.

== Activism ==
Sakaguchi joined the Communist Party of Japan in 1931. In response to the Japanese Invasion of Manchuria in 1931, and the Japanese Invasion of Shanghai in 1932, Sakaguchi launched the anti-war newspaper "Soaring Mast" in February 1932. Six issues were produced and distributed.

== Arrest and death ==
Kiichiro Sakaguchi was arrested by Japanese authorities in Tokyo on November 15, 1933. Kiichiro would be held in the Kure Military Police Detention Center before being transferred to Hiroshima Prison. In Hiroshima Prison, he was tortured by the Special Higher Police. While in custody, Kiichiro would go on a hunger strike. He died in prison on December 27, 1933. He was 31 years old.

== Legacy ==
The Kiichiro Sakaguchi monument was erected in Izumi City, his place of birth. Amongst those who visited the monument was Japanese Communist Party politician Yoshiki Yamashita. On December 7, 2013, a rally was held at the Izumi City Community Center on the 80th anniversary of Sakaguchi's death.

== See also ==
- Dissent in the Armed Forces of the Empire of Japan
- Takiji Kobayashi
- Political dissidence in the Empire of Japan
