= Umbrella (children's book) =

1958 book by Taro Yashima

- First edition
- Author: Taro Yashima
- Illustrator: Taro Yashima
- Cover artist: Taro Yashima
- Language: English
- Genre: Picture book
- Publisher: Viking Press
- Publication date: 1958
- Publication place: United States
- Media type: Print
- Pages: 30 pp
- OCLC: 5772634

Umbrella by Taro Yashima is a children's picture book that was named the 1959 Caldecott Honor Book. It consists of numerous colorful Japanese illustrations that reflect its culture. It was originally published in 1958 then later reprinted in August 1977 by Puffin Books.

== Plot ==
Umbrella is a short story where a little girl is the principal character. Her name is Momo, which means "peach" in Japanese, and she was born in New York.

Momo carries the blue umbrella and wears the rubber boots that she was given on her third birthday. She asks her mother every day to use her umbrella. Momo tried to tell her mother she needed to carry the umbrella to the school because the sunshine and the wind bothered her eyes. But her mother didn't let her use the umbrella and advises her to wait until the rain comes. The rain took a long time to fall down because it was Indian summer, however, when the rain came, her umbrella was the perfect excuse to use that day. Momo was happy, the rain sound over her umbrella was a music for her.

== Reception ==
Kirkus Reviews gave Umbrella a star review and wrote "The pictures are full of the city's moods and the child's joy in a rainy day."
