= League to Raise the Political Consciousness of Japanese Troops =

Japanese resistance organization founded 1939

The League to Raise the Political Consciousness of Japanese Troops (日本兵士覚醒同盟, Nihon Heishi Kakusei Dōmei) was a Japanese resistance organization founded during the Second Sino-Japanese War. It was founded in 1939 by Japanese soldiers taken prisoner by the Eighth Route Army. According to Japanese historian Saburo Ienaga, this was the first antiwar activity by prisoners in the Communist areas.

Its most notable member was Mitsushige Maeda (前田光繁) who was later responsible for informing on Japanese during the Tonghua incident.

== See also ==
- Japanese People's Anti-war Alliance
- Japanese dissidence during the early Shōwa period
- Japanese People's Emancipation League
