= Japanese People's Anti-war Alliance =

Chinese Japanese resistance organization

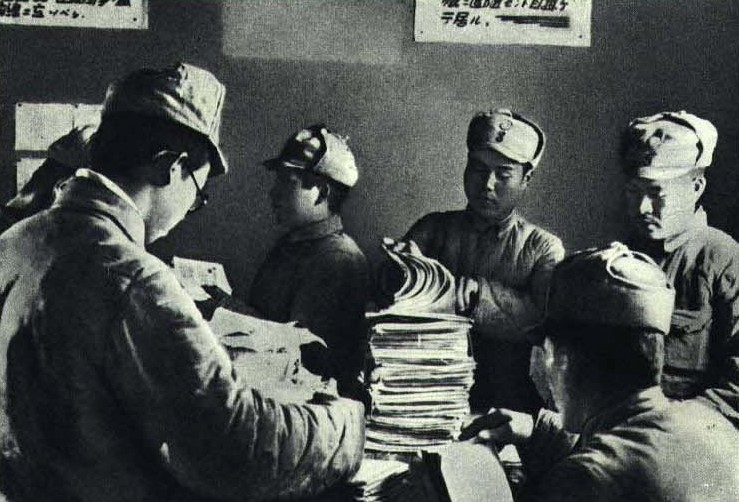
Members of the Japanese People's Anti-war Alliance during the Second Sino-Japanese War.

The Japanese People's Anti-war Alliance (日本人反戦同盟, Nihonjin Hansen Dōmei) was a Chinese allied Japanese resistance organization in China during the Second Sino-Japanese War.

== Background ==
In 1937, war broke out between China and the Empire of Japan, sparking the Second Sino-Japanese War. A few Japanese political dissidents were living in China by the time the war started. Kazuo Aoyama, Kaji Wataru, and his wife Yuki Ikeda. Kazuo Aoyama had been attached to the Chinese Army when the war broke out. He was working in the propaganda department in Nanking before going to Hankow. Kaji and Yuki Ikeda were stranded in Shanghai when the war broke out. Eventually, with the help of Rewi Alley, the two would be smuggled into Hong Kong, and, eventually, by invitation by the Chinese, to Hankow in 1938. According to Koji Ariyoshi, Kaji, Yuki, and Kazuo were the first to re-educate and use Japanese POWs on the front lines in Asia. The Japanese POWs that they re-educated would form the basis of the Anti-War Alliance.

== The Anti-War Alliance ==
In December 1939, the Anti-War Alliance was formed in Guilin with fifty members. Members of the Alliance were made up of Japanese POWs who defected to the Chinese resistance. Kaji Wataru served as the Alliance leader. The League established their HQ in Chungking in 1940. A branch of the League would be established in Yenan in May 1940.

The Alliance would be utilized in the Battle of Kunlun Pass, utilizing loud speakers to convince Japanese soldiers to defect. In Feb 1940, Kaji Wataru reported that Matsuyama Oyama and another member named Aikawa were killed in the South China front while addressing Japanese troops through loudspeakers. They were the first members of the League to be killed in action.

As the Second United Front deteriorated, the activities of the Alliance became curtailed and eventually disbanded by the Nationalists. According to Koji Ariyoshi, following the destruction of the Alliance, Kaji's converts were sent back to the POW camps due to them being considered as "dangerous elements". The Japanese People's Emancipation League would absorb the remnants of the Japanese Anti-War Alliance.

== See also ==
- Teru Hasegawa
- League to Raise the Political Consciousness of Japanese Troops
- Japanese in the Chinese resistance to the Empire of Japan
