= Japanese American Committee for Democracy =

The Japanese American Committee for Democracy (JACD, Japanese: 日米民主委員会, Nichibei Minshu Iinkai) was an organization during and after World War II.

== History ==
The committee was founded in New York in 1940 as the Committee for Democratic Treatment for Japanese Residents in Eastern States. Its first leader was Issei Reverend Alfred Saburo Akamatsu.

Following World War II, the committee received its ultimate title and began organizing public demonstrations of Japanese American loyalty. These demonstrations included war bond rallies, blood drives, and art exhibitions. A number of its members also volunteered for the Foreign Language Division of the Office of War Information as translators or writers.

JACD originally had a mixed Issei-Nisei membership and limited its activities to New York City. However, by the mid-1940s, the JACD had transformed itself into a mass Nisei-based organization that urged political action nationwide. By the end of 1944, all Issei board members were asked to resign.

JACD reached out to the Chinese Hand Laundry Alliance and endorsed the repeal of the Chinese Exclusion Act. In 1944 the JACD joined the Communist-sponsored National Negro Congress in a fall rally to support the reelection of President Franklin Roosevelt.

Despite the organization's apparent focus, its information discussed a variety of topics. The newsletter promoted rallies, cultural and political events and reported on issues such as "Nisei in the Army" and democracy in postwar Japan. The newsletter also contained JACD business sections such as "Membership Meetings," "Community News," and editorials.

In the last months of World War II, the JACD sponsored the Japanese People's Emancipation League, a Chinese Communist Party linked Japanese resistance organization that operated in China. In 1945, the JACD published "Japanese People's Emancipation League: its program and activities. A Japanese people's movement for a democratic Japan".

== Support for internment ==
The JACD newsletter stated that most Japanese Americans were loyal, but indicated that the organization remained concerned about the possibility of Fifth columnists. Yoshitaka Takagi, JACD secretary, denounced the internment protesters during the war.

Galen Fisher, of the Committee on National Security and Fair Play, resigned from JACD's advisory board because he disagreed with its "fundamental policy of accepting the evacuation without reservation or right to criticism."

== See also ==
- Japanese American Citizens League
- Japanese American National Museum
- Densho: The Japanese American Legacy Project
- Japanese American National Library
- U.S.-Japan Council
- Ayako Ishigaki
- Yasuo Kuniyoshi
