= Yuki Ikeda =

Japanese dissident

Yuki Ikeda (1912-1973), also known as Sachiko Ikeda, was a Japanese dissident and wife of Kaji Wataru.

While still in college, Yuki was active in Toyohiko Kagawa's Christian reform movements. She was imprisoned several times for her anti-Emperor activities, reduced to an invalid after each imprisonment. Once her inquisitors broke all the fingers of both her hands.

She continued her underground organization of Japanese women workers until she fled to China. Earning a meager living working as a ballroom dancer in Shanghai amidst poor health. While in the city, she met and married her husband. A fellow Japanese dissident named Kaji Wataru.

Following the outbreak of war in 1937, Yuki and her husband fled to the French Concession. Closely monitored by the Japanese authorities. Trapped in occupied Shanghai, the two had planned to commit suicide if it wasn't for the intervention of Rewi Alley, who provided them with the proper papers to enter Hong Kong. They were given shelter by the Chinese artist Huang Xinbo while living there.

Yuki and her husband would stay in Hong Kong for four months before being smuggled into Wuhan in 1938. Where she was appointed as a design consultant for the Political Department of the Nationalist Government. After the "Japanese People's Anti-war Alliance" was established by her husband, Kaji, in 1938, Yuki travelled to Guilin to participate in the League's work. Conducting anti-war propaganda among Japanese prisoners of war. The League would be disbanded following the breakdown of the United Front.

After the war, her and her husband were warmly received by Mao Zedong and Zhou Enlai in Chongqing and received high praise. It was reported that Mao Zedong thanked them for their "special contribution to the Chinese people's sacred war of resistance".

She later returned to Japan, becoming a founding member of the Japan-China Friendship Association and promoting Sino-Japanese trade as a representative of the Wushan Trading Company. During this time, she amassed a considerable collection of Chinese calligraphy and paintings. Which were repatriated to China and put up for auction in 2019.

== See also ==
- Japanese dissidence during the Shōwa period
- Japanese in the Chinese resistance to the Empire of Japan
- Japanese People's Emancipation League
