= Sanzō Nosaka =

Japanese politician (1892–1993)

- 野坂 参三
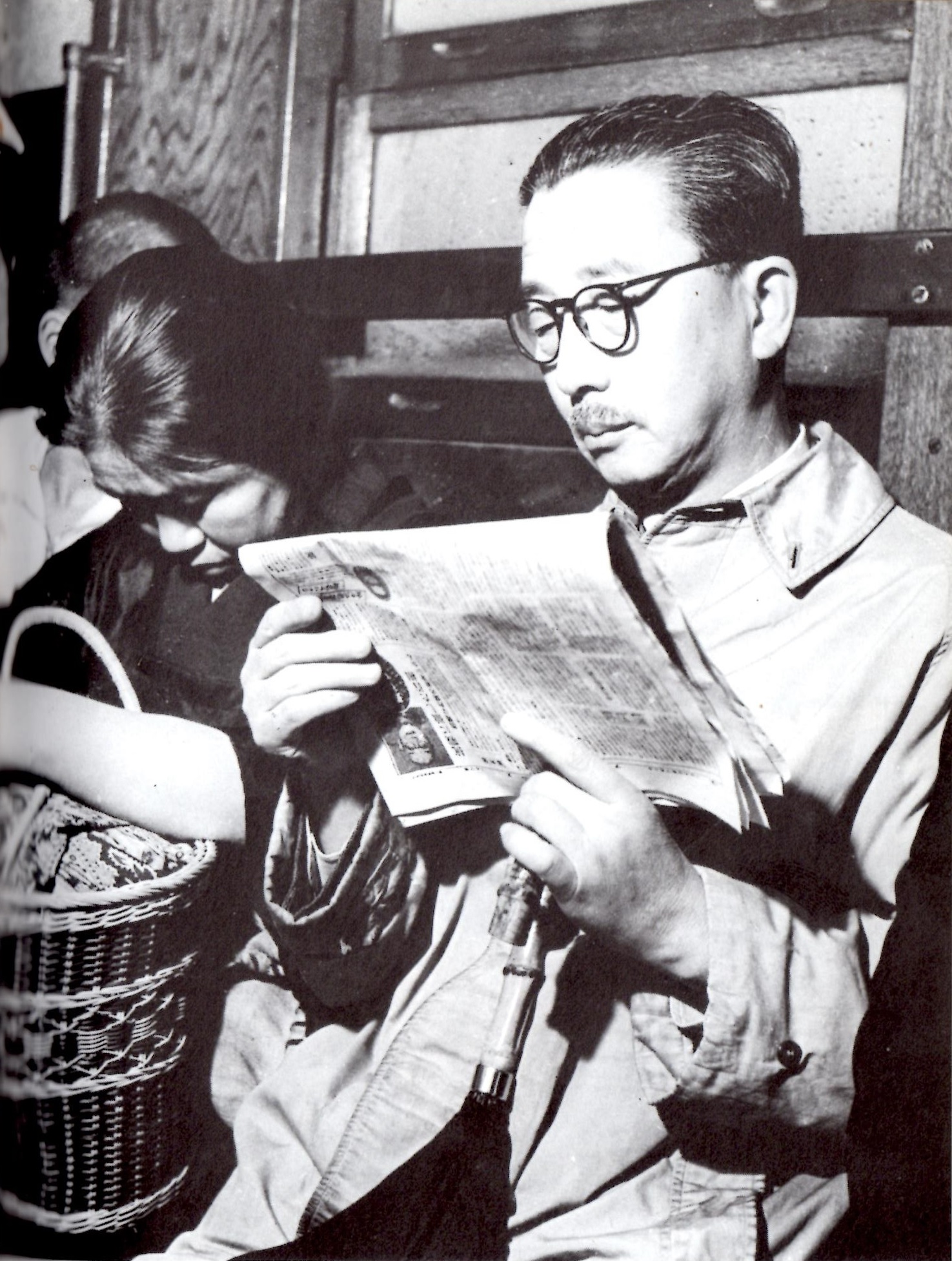
- Nosaka in 1949

Honorary Chairman of the Japanese Communist Party
- In office 1982–1992

Chairman of the Central Committee of the Japanese Communist Party
- In office 1 August 1958 – 31 July 1987
- Preceded by: Office established
- Succeeded by: Kenji Miyamoto

First Secretary of the Japanese Communist Party
- In office 1955–1958
- Preceded by: Kyuichi Tokuda
- Succeeded by: Kenji Miyamoto

Member of the House of Councillors
- In office 8 July 1956 – 3 July 1977
- Preceded by: Makoto Hori
- Succeeded by: Koji Kakizawa
- Constituency: Tokyo at-large

Member of the House of Representatives
- In office 11 April 1946 – 6 June 1950
- Preceded by: Constituency established
- Succeeded by: Hyō Hara (1952)
- Constituency: Tokyo 1st

Personal details
- Born: 30 March 1892 Hagi, Yamaguchi, Japan
- Died: 14 November 1993 (aged 101) Tokyo, Japan
- Party: JCP (1922–1992)
- Other political affiliations: CPGB (1920–1921); CCP (1940–1945)
- Spouse: Ryu Kudzuno (m. 1919; died 1971)
- Education: Keio University

Sanzō Nosaka (野坂 参三, Nosaka Sanzō; March 30, 1892 – November 14, 1993) was a Japanese writer, editor, labor organizer, communist agent, politician, and university professor and a founder of the Japanese Communist Party (JCP). He was the son of a wealthy Japanese merchant, and attended Keio University. While in university, Nosaka became interested in social movements, and joined a moderate labor organization after graduation, working as a research staff member, and as a writer and editor of the organization's magazine. He traveled to Britain in 1919 to study political economy, where he deepened his studies of Marxism and became a confirmed communist. Nosaka was a founding member of the Communist Party of Great Britain, but his activity within British communist circles led to him being deported from Britain in 1921.

After leaving Britain, Nosaka traveled through the Soviet Union (USSR). He returned to Japan in 1922, where he co-founded the Japanese Communist Party (JCP). Nosaka became a labor organizer, but was arrested twice by the Japanese government for his activities. After being released from prison a second time, Nosaka secretly returned to the USSR in 1931, where he became an agent of the Comintern. He traveled to the West Coast of the United States, where he worked as a spy from 1934 to 1938.

After leaving the United States, Nosaka worked in China from 1940 to 1945, supporting the Chinese Communist Party (CCP) by encouraging and recruiting captured Japanese soldiers to support and fight for the Chinese communists against the Imperial Japanese Army, and coordinating a spy network that operated throughout Japanese-occupied China. After the end of the Second World War in 1945, Nosaka returned to Japan with hundreds of other Japanese communists, where he led the JCP during the occupation by the Allies.

Nosaka attempted to brand the JCP as a "lovable" populist party supporting Japan's peaceful transition to socialism, but his strategy was criticized within the party and within the Soviet Union. During the Korean War the JCP temporarily endorsed violence, and Nosaka disappeared from public life and went underground. He re-emerged to lead the JCP again in 1955, after which he attempted to disrupt the US-Japan Security Treaty by organizing public demonstrations, but he generally supported the JCP's role as a peaceful party. In 1958 Nosaka became Chairman of the JCP, a position he held until retirement at the age of 90, after which he was declared Honorary Chairman. Nosaka joined the faculty of Keio University, and he was widely idolized among left-wing intellectuals until shortly before his death, when the fall of the Soviet Union exposed controversial aspects of his relationship with Joseph Stalin's Communist regime.

== Early life and education ==
Sanzō Nosaka was the son of a prosperous Japanese merchant and was raised in a bourgeois environment. As a young man Nosaka was known for his fashionable taste in clothing and for the large dog that often accompanied him in public. He was quiet, serious, studious, introverted, and more comfortable in libraries than at public demonstrations. After his secondary education, Nosaka attended Keio University, which was then considered a "rich boys school". At Keio, Nosaka became interested in the international labor movement, an interest that was largely supported by one of his professors, Kiichi Horie. Nosaka decided to write his senior thesis on the moderate labor organization founded by Bunji Suzuki, "Yuaikai" ("The Friendly Society"). To research his thesis, Nosaka contacted Yuaikai's head office, and acquainted himself with its senior leaders: Suzuki initially mistook Nosaka for a salesman the first time they met, but eventually grew fond of Nosaka. When Nosaka graduated from Keio, in 1915, he joined Yuaikai and worked for the organization as a research staff member and as an editor of the organization's journal, Rodo Oyobi Sangyo (Labour and Industry).

Nosaka became interested in communism after the 1917 Bolshevik Revolution. As a greater volume of leftist literature entered Japan from the West, Nosaka's political orientation moved farther from the center. The first Western texts on revolutionary social theory available in Japan were mostly on anarchism, but Nosaka also enjoyed Edward Bellamy's utopian novel, Looking Backward. In 1918–1919 Nosaka read an English copy of The Communist Manifesto brought to Japan by his friend, Shinzo Koizumi. After reading The Communist Manifesto, Nosaka embraced the theories of Marxism.

Nosaka announced his intentions to go abroad to study social theory in the November 1918 issue of Rodo Oyobi Sangyo. He sailed out of Kobe harbor on July 7, 1919, and arrived in London on August 27. After his arrival, Nosaka studied political economy at London University. Like many British intellectuals at the time, Nosaka deepened his studies of Marxism, and became a confirmed communist at the university. While in London Nosaka became active in communist circles. He affiliated himself with notable trade union leaders active in London, and attended the September 8–13, 1919 Glasgow Trade Union Congress as a correspondent for Rodo Oyobi Sangyo. Nosaka was a founding member of the Communist Party of Great Britain in 1920, and attended the Party's first session as a representative from London. Nosaka's activities within the Communist Party brought him to the attention of Scotland Yard, and Nosaka was deported from Britain in 1921. After he left Britain, Nosaka traveled through Europe to the newly formed Soviet Union. In Russia, with the help of friendly contacts in the communist hierarchy, Nosaka became influential within the Communist Party. Nosaka was suspected of being either a British or Japanese agent; but, because of his contacts among high-ranking Finnish and Russian leaders, Nosaka was never purged. Nosaka wrote A Brief Review of the Labour Movement in Japan. It was published by the International Council of Trade and Industrial Unions in 1921

After attending the Far Eastern People's Conference in the Soviet Union, Nosaka returned to Japan in 1922, and helped found the Japanese Communist Party (JCP) that same year. Nosaka was more secretive about his relationship with the Communist Party than he had been in Britain, and kept his membership a secret from Bunji Suzuki and other moderate labour leaders. After his return, Nosaka worked as a trade unionist and editor of the JCP's official newspaper, Musansha Shimbun.

Because of his activities within the Communist Party (which was illegal in Japan), Nosaka, like many communists in Japan, was arrested (twice in his case), interrogated, and tortured by the Kempeitai, but he was released after short periods both times. Nosaka was first arrested in 1923, and released within a year. After his release, Nosaka became more active within the Japanese labor movement. In March 1928, the Japanese police began a campaign to harass and destroy the JCP, beginning with the May 15 Incident. After his second arrest in 1929, Nosaka spent two years in jail. He was released in 1931 on the grounds of illness. The short lengths of Nosaka's arrests aroused suspicion among other Japanese communists that Nosaka had given important information to the Japanese secret police, but these suspicions were never acted upon.

== Comintern agent ==
Upon his release, Nosaka secretly returned to the Soviet Union, arriving in Moscow in March 1931. While there, Nosaka served as a representative of the JCP, and worked as an executive member of the Comintern. While in Moscow Nosaka helped to draft the "1932 Thesis", which became the guiding document of the JCP until 1946. Most of his colleagues active in the JCP, who were not able to go abroad, were subsequently arrested by the Kempeitai by the fall of 1932.

One of Nosaka's friends was Kenzō Yamamoto, a well-known Japanese communist who had been in the Soviet Union with his common-law wife, Matsu, since 1928. Yamamoto had a reputation as a great womanizer, and when rumors circulated that Yamamoto was engaged in an affair with Nosaka's wife, Ryu, Nosaka wrote a confidential letter to the NKVD (dated February 22, 1939) indicating that he believed Yamamoto and his wife were likely Japanese spies in the pay of the Kempeitai. On Stalin's orders, both Yamamoto and Matsu were arrested as spies. A firing squad executed Yamamoto, and Matsu died in a gulag. Both Yamamoto and his wife were formally rehabilitated after their deaths by Nikita Khrushchev on May 23, 1956, recognizing the lack of any evidence that the two were actually spies. In his autobiography, Nosaka later wrote that he had tried to save Yamamoto's life.

In 1934, Nosaka secretly traveled to the West Coast of the United States, where he became involved in intelligence work on behalf of the International Liaison Department of the Comintern against the government of the Empire of Japan. Nosaka's activities included disseminating information to communists still active in Japan, infiltrating and making contact with the Japanese communities active in the United States, and establishing a number of communist front organizations in Seattle, Los Angeles, and other cities on the West Coast. Nosaka worked to gain funding from the Comintern for his activities, and attempted to have other Japanese Communists secretly relocated to America. He planned to recruit American and Japanese agents to send to Yokohama to establish a cell that would operate as a communist front organization. Because the records from this period are incomplete, historians cannot be certain to what extent Nosaka's efforts in America were successful. Nosaka worked as a Comintern agent in America until 1938, when he returned to Moscow. In 1940, the Comintern ordered Nosaka to aid communist forces in China.

In May 1943, Nosaka was the representative of the JCP in the case of the dissolution of the Comintern.

== Activities in China ==
Zhou Enlai and Sanzō Nosaka (left) in Yan'an.

Nosaka (middle) and Mao Zedong (right) at the Seventh Congress of the Chinese Communist Party

From March 1940 to the end of 1945, during the Second Sino-Japanese War, Nosaka resided at the Chinese Red Army base in Yan'an, in Shaanxi Province, where he headed the Japanese People's Emancipation League (JPEL). The JPEL engaged in the "re-education" of numerous Japanese prisoners of war (POWs) and created propaganda on behalf of the Chinese Communists. Japanese troops captured by the Communists were then used by the Communists in various civilian and military roles, and were especially valued because their level of technical expertise was generally greater than that of most Chinese soldiers. "Re-educated" Japanese troops were instrumental in a number of Communist victories after World War II, including the 1949 Pingjin Campaign, in which most of the artillery fielded by the Communists was manned by Japanese gunners. In general, the method of "re-education" devised and employed by Nosaka was highly effective.

Initially, the Red Army was a purely guerrilla force without the facilities to imprison POWs. The policy of the Eighth Route Army, the main communist force active during World War II, was to interrogate prisoners and then release them. After reports surfaced that the Japanese were punishing Japanese prisoners after they returned, the Red Army's policy gradually changed to one of retraining POWs, and the communists began to implement this policy after Nosaka arrived in Yan'an. By the time of its war with China, the Japanese army was educating its officers and common soldiers to die rather than surrender. Injured soldiers were easily captured, and made up the bulk of Japanese POWs. Captured Japanese believed that they would be killed, but were instead fed and clothed, and began to develop a rapport with their captors.

Besides Nosaka's regimen of psychological indoctrination, there were several reasons that Japanese POWs chose to join the Chinese communists. Communist guerrillas took care to develop an early rapport with their prisoners by treating them well. Captured Japanese soldiers were generally moved when they learned of the terrible conditions the war inflicted on the Chinese people, a perspective that they had not been exposed to before their capture. Closer to the end of the war, the growing possibility of defeat created anxiety among the Japanese army. Because of the Japanese military's policy to never surrender, Japanese soldiers never received any training about how to act as POWs: upon returning to Japanese ranks, many would face disgrace, punishment, and starvation. Many Japanese soldiers committed suicide after their capture, but those who chose to live generally came to sympathize with the Chinese. The Japanese army was aware of the existence of Nosaka's Communist Japanese soldiers, and feared the phenomena out of proportion to their actual threat. Koji Ariyoshi, an American who met Nosaka in Yan'an wrote that Nosaka was "the Japanese national who undoubtedly contributed the most in the war against Japanese militarism". The Japanese army attempted to use numerous spies and assassins in order to eliminate Nosaka (who used the name "Okano Susumu" for the duration of the war), but were unsuccessful. Nosaka maintained a network of agents throughout Japanese-occupied China, which he used to gather information about events within the Japanese Empire and about the war.

From 1940 to 1943, Nosaka's presence in China was kept a secret. Under a Chinese name, Lin Zhe, he directed the work of the Research Office of the Japanese Problem. His work with the Research Office in Yan'an brought Yan'an's intelligence information about Japan up to date. Nosaka collected newspapers and other publications from Japan. To research the enemy, Nosaka and his crew took care to analyze current events in Japan and China, which they did by stocking Japanese newspapers, magazines, journals, and diaries that were purchased or seized on the battlefield.

During Nosaka's exile in Yan'an, he lived with his "wife", a "lively Chinese girl" fluent in Japanese. Their residence was a modest, newly built stone house, surrounded by a spacious vegetable garden. His "real" wife, Ryu, had remained in Moscow, when Nosaka left for China. Nosaka's Chinese "wife", Zhuang Tao, was a 24-year-old student who had been assigned to serve as Nosaka's secretary during the war. After the war, the two separated when he flew back to Japan. Zhuang Tao would eventually marry Huang Nai, the posthumous son of the Chinese revolutionary Huang Xing. During the "Red Purge", Nosaka returned to China. Residing in Beijing. He approached Zhou Enlai, requesting to meet Zhuang Tao. In response, Zhou Enlai informed Nosaka that she was "happily married and did not want to see him". However, Zhuang Tao's marriage to her husband, Huang Nai, would eventually dissolve after over two years of marriage.

Nosaka's Japanese "prisoner converts" fought freely for the Chinese communists once their re-education was complete. In Yan'an, the Japanese lived normal lives without guards, owned a cooperative store, and printed their own news bulletins and propaganda. Visiting American officers used Nosaka's Japanese soldiers to critique and improve their own methods of anti-Japanese psychological warfare. Shortly after Japan's surrender in 1945, Nosaka began to march with approximately 200 other Japanese Communists across northern China. They arrived at the coast after picking up hundreds of other Japanese along the way. Demanding immediate repatriation from the first Americans they found, they declared their intention to return and work "for the democratization of Japan and the establishment of peace in the Far East". Although there are no records of the exact number of Japanese "re-educated" by Nosaka who elected to remain in Communist-occupied China after 1945, it is estimated that "the number must have been considerable".

According to Andrew Roth, when the handful of American and British correspondents and government observers arrived in Yenan in the summer of 1944, one of the persons they were most interested in interviewing was Sanzo Nosaka. Due to his reputation as both a leader of the Japanese Communist Party and the Japanese People's Emancipation League.

Nosaka's contributions to the eventual victory of the Red Army were not forgotten by the leaders he had worked with in China. In 1965, on the twentieth anniversary of Japan's defeat, Nosaka was publicly praised by name by the highest-ranking general in China at the time, Lin Biao.

During the war, Nosaka was in correspondence with both Chiang-Kai Shek and Mao Zedong, even acting as a liaison between Chiang and Mao after the deterioration of the Second United Front.

On February 14, 1945, Nosaka (Under his alias Okano) was mentioned in Fumimaro Konoe's "Konoe Memorial", a report written to Emperor Hirohito in the waning years of the war. In Konoe's report, he called for Hirohito to surrender to the Allies to prevent a "communist revolution" in Japan, citing threats such as Okano, as well as Soviet expansionism.

== Political career ==
Sanzō Nosaka speaking to a crowd in Tokyo (ca. 1946)

After World War II, Nosaka's return to Japan was facilitated by E. Herbert Norman, the Canadian representative to the Supreme Commander of the Allied Powers, who may also have been a Soviet spy. Before returning to Japan, Nosaka gained Stalin's endorsement for the leadership of the Japanese Communist Party. Nosaka's re-entry to Japan was also aided by the American diplomat John S. Service, who had a history of being friendly to Chinese Communists. Before returning to Japan, Nosaka advised Joseph Stalin to retain the position of the Japanese Emperor, but to replace Emperor Hirohito with Crown Prince Akihito if the Communists ever gained control of Japan.

After the war, Nosaka made a months-long trek from Yenan to Japan, accompanied by members of the Japanese Peasants' and Workers' School. He traveled through Manchuria, North and South Korea on foot, horseback, ox-cart, truck, plane, ship, and train. While staying in Pyongyang he met Kim Il Sung.

Nosaka arrived back in Japan in January 1946, and received a hero's welcome from the JCP. It was reported that Nosaka's arrival at party headquarters in Tokyo was treated like a celebrity event. With one newspaper reporting of young girls in both kimonos and Western dress gathered like fans awaiting a star at the stage door. In his first public address, Nosaka lambasted "so-called patriots" for destroying the nation and declared that "we Communists are the true patriots and true service brigade of democracy.". US Secretary of State Cordell Hull had sent a cable to the American Embassy in Chungking. Where he appproved the use of Nosaka Sanzo as a "Tito of Japan".

He returned to China as a recognized protege of Mao Zedong, and enjoyed the informal recognition as a "roving ambassador" for Japanese communism. After his return to Japan, Nosaka worked to organize Japanese communists. Nosaka's strategy was to foster what he called a "lovable" image for the JCP, seeking to take advantage of the seemingly pro-labor American-led Occupation to bring about a peaceful socialist revolution in Japan. This strategy was highly successful at first, attracting for the party a large following within the student and labor movements and among intellectuals. In the general elections of 1946, Nosaka and four other members of the JCP were elected to the Diet, and the party received 4% of the popular vote. Thereafter, the JCP made further progress infiltrating Japanese labor associations and socialist parties, and in the general elections of 1949, the JCP gained 10% of the popular vote.

However, with the fall of China in 1949 and increasing Cold War tensions around the world, the United States initiated the so-called "Reverse Course" in Occupation policy, shifting away from demilitarization and democratization to remilitarization, suppressing leftists, and strengthening Japan's conservative elements in support of U.S. Cold War objectives in Asia. At the Occupation's urging, the Japanese state and private corporations carried out a sweeping "Red Purge", firing tens of thousands of communists and suspected communists from their jobs in both government and the private sector.

In January 1950, in response to the Occupation-backed Red Purge and at the behest of Stalin, the Soviet-led Cominform published a tract harshly criticizing the JCP's peaceful line as "opportunism" and "glorifying American imperialism" and demanding that the JCP take steps to pursue immediate violent revolution in Japan. Competition between JCP factions to win Cominform approval in the wake of this devastating "Cominform Criticism" ultimately led by the summer of 1951 to a complete reversal in JCP tactics from the peaceful pursuit of revolution within democratic institutions to an embrace of immediate and violent revolution along Maoist lines. This resulted in a campaign of terror in which JCP activists threw Molotov cocktails at police boxes across Japan and cadres were sent into the countryside with instructions to organize oppressed farmers into "mountain village guerrilla units" (sanson kōsakutai). As punishment for his advocacy of the "lovable" image, Nosaka was temporarily driven out of the party and forced to go underground.

After Nosaka went underground, the U.S. Central Intelligence Agency reported that he temporarily returned to China. Meanwhile, the JCP's new militant line was a disaster. A full-blown communist revolution failed to emerge in Japan, the JCP activists were rapidly arrested and imprisoned, and in the 1952 general election, the JCP was wiped out in the polls, losing every one of the 35 seats it held in the Lower House of the Japanese Diet. The JCP spent the next three years gradually backing down from the militant line, finally renouncing it fully in 1955, which paved the way for Nosaka's return to power. Nosaka re-emerged in Japan in 1955 as the First Secretary of the JCP. Nosaka was briefly arrested after he resurfaced, but quickly released.

In 1958, Nosaka became the chairman of the JCP's Central Committee. He played a part in organizing the Anpo protests in 1960 against the revised US-Japan Security Treaty. In May 1960, as the protests were reaching their height, Nosaka published a lengthy essay in the Communist journal Zen'ei titled "We Will Not Accept the New Security Treaty." These massive demonstrations forced the American president, Dwight Eisenhower, to cancel a visit to Japan, and forced the Japanese Premier, Nobusuke Kishi, to resign, but failed to achieve their main goal of preventing passage of the revised Security Treaty, which Kishi ruthlessly rammed through the Diet in spite of the popular opposition. In Japanese public opinion, the demonstrations were received as a national embarrassment, and the JCP received only 3% of the popular vote in the 1960 elections.

The Anpo protests outraged and energized the Japanese right wing. On October 12, during a televised election debate, Inejirō Asanuma, the chairman of the Japanese Socialist Party, was assassinated by a 17-year-old right-wing youth, Otoya Yamaguchi, who rushed onto the stage and fatally stabbed him twice in the stomach with a wakizashi. After his arrest, Yamaguchi told police that he had hoped to assassinate Nosaka as well. On November 13, 1963, Nosaka survived an assassination attempt while making a speech in Osaka. The perpetrator was 22-year-old Masahiro Nakao, a member of the rightist group Dai Nippon Gokuku Dan. Nakao, armed with a dagger, leaped on a platform where Nosaka was giving his speech. Nakao was subdued by Party members who turned him over to the police.

Nosaka attempted to keep the JCP neutral during the Sino-Soviet Split of the 1960s, though the CIA interpreted that Nosaka's party remained somewhat more friendly with the Chinese. On Nosaka's seventieth birthday party in 1962, Nosaka received extravagant praise from Beijing. Deng Xiaoping praised Nosaka as an "outstanding fighter of the Japanese people and comrade-in-arms of the Chinese people". The Soviets sent Nosaka a matter-of-fact confirmation of his status within the JCP, and within a month sent the JCP another letter scolding the Party for not adequately supporting Soviet positions. The Soviets' measured praise of Nosaka was consistent with earlier Cominform criticism of Nosaka's political theories, which advocated a peaceful transition into communism.

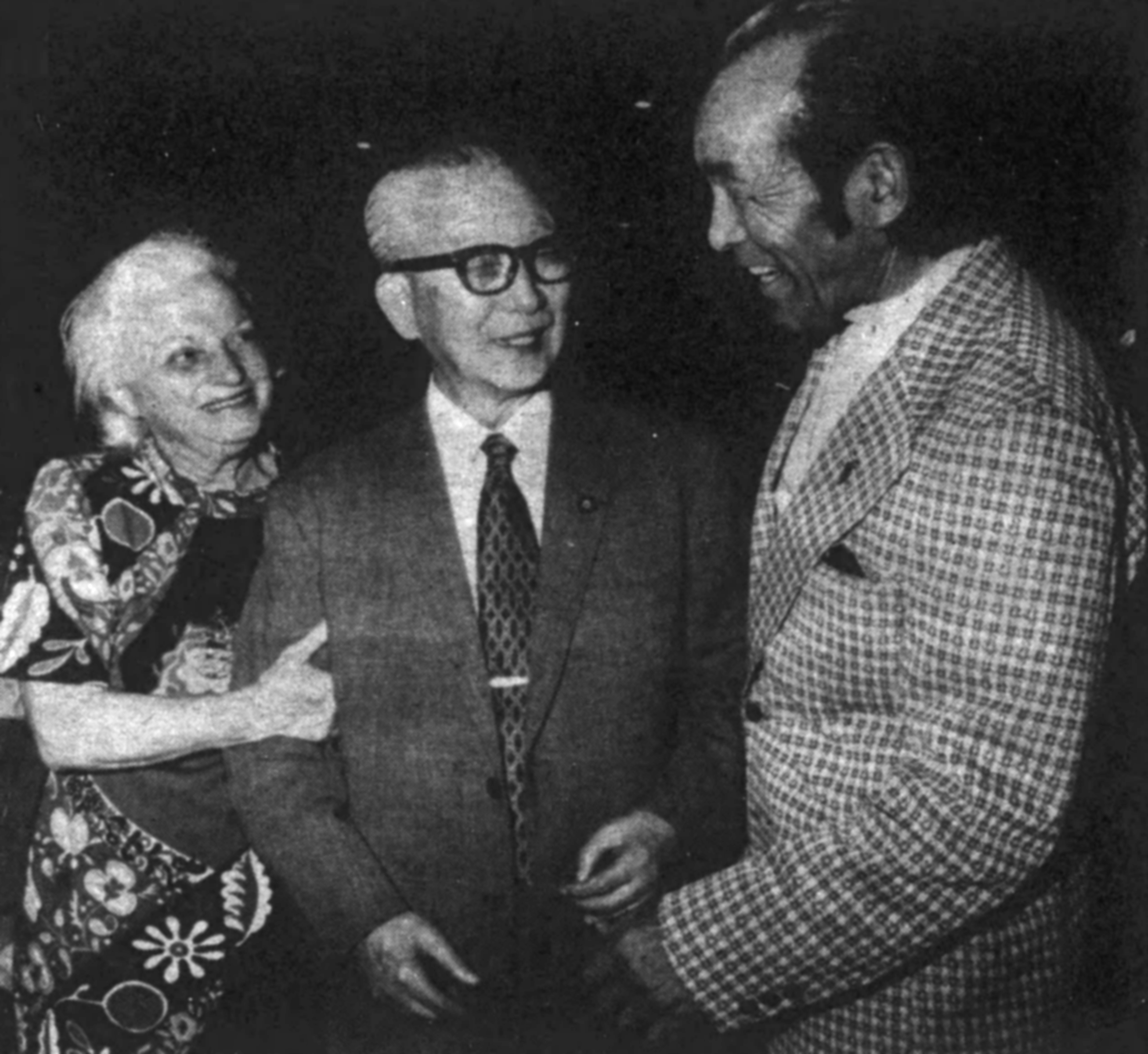
Nosaka (center) greets American communists Elaine and Karl Yoneda at a symposium in Tokyo, July 1972

After his re-entry into public life in 1955, Nosaka was elected to the House of Councillors, a post that he held until 1977. Nosaka joined the faculty of Keio University, and was one of many prominent communist intellectuals active in Japanese academic institutions in his time. Nosaka remained the JCP's chairman from 1958 to 1982, when he stepped down at the age of 90 and took the role of "Honorary Chairman".

== Scandal ==
On September 27, 1992, two Journalists working for the magazine Shukan Bunshun, Akira Kato and Shun'ichi Kobayashi, publicly revealed evidence of Nosaka's involvement in the deaths of Kenzō Yamamoto and his wife. On a trip to Moscow, Kobayashi and Kato had managed to purchase a number of KGB documents, which had been kept secret since the Stalinist era. Among these documents was the letter that Nosaka had written in 1939 denouncing Yamamoto and his wife.

The revelations of Nosaka's involvement in Yamamoto's death shocked the JCP, already reduced to six seats in the Diet after the 1991 elections. Akahata ("Red Flag"), the JCP's newspaper, sent a team of journalists to Moscow to investigate the allegations, and they confirmed the authenticity of the documents.

After the allegations against Nosaka became widely known, he checked himself into Yoyogi Hospital in Tokyo (a common tactic of Japanese politicians facing scandal). When a team of investigators sent by the JCP visited him, Nosaka confessed that the letter was his, but refused to discuss the matter further. The JCP ordered Nosaka to be present for a general Party meeting on December 27, 1992. After some deliberation, the party that Nosaka helped found expelled him by unanimous vote. Akahata reported that Nosaka, when asked if he had any reply to the charges against him, would only state: "I have nothing to say".

== Death ==
One year after being expelled from the Japanese Communist Party, Sanzō Nosaka died at home of old age. Outside the JCP, Nosaka was remembered for his gentle demeanor, good manners, and conservative sense of style, "just like a British gentleman". He was 101 years old.

== Legacy ==
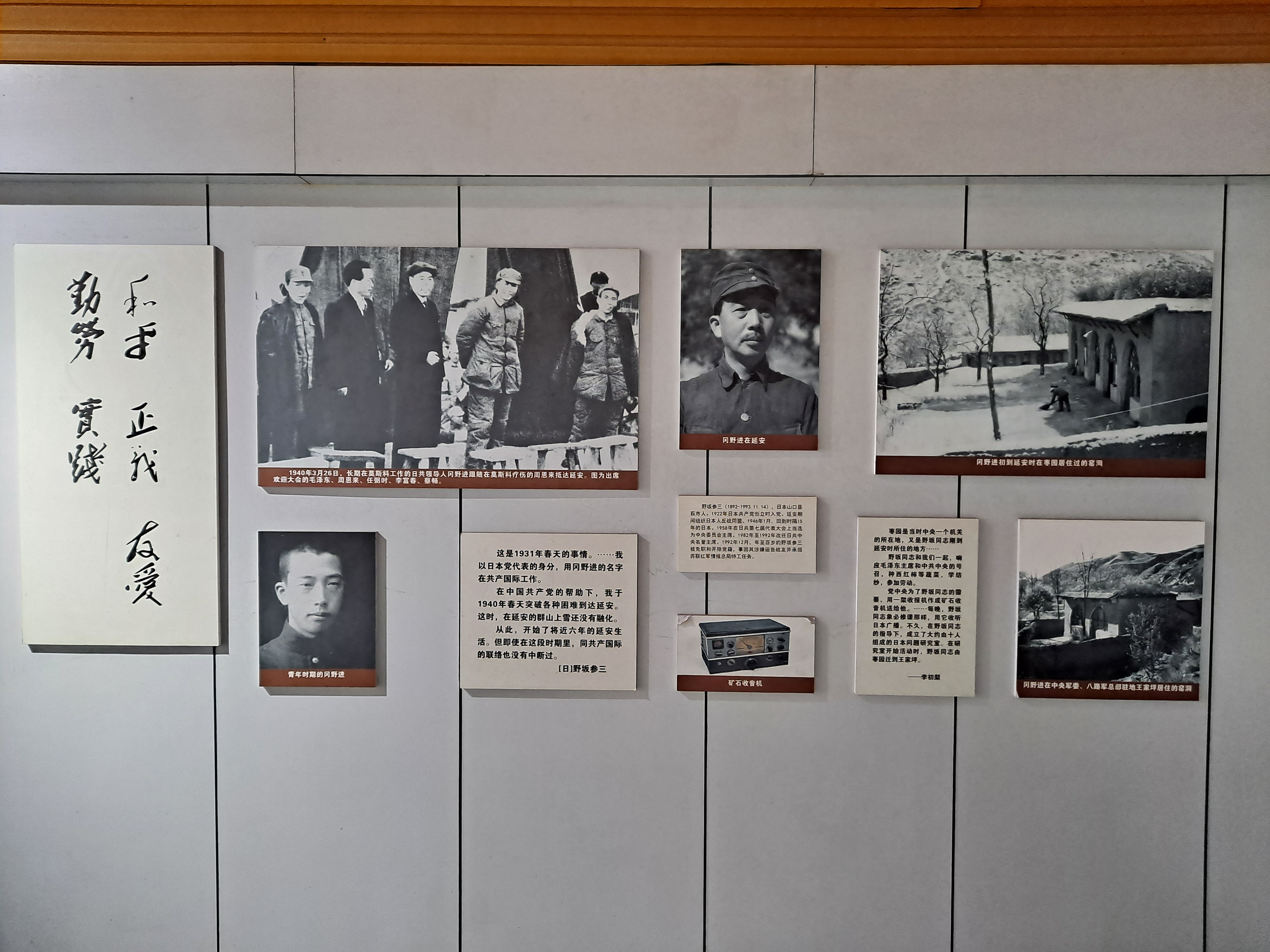
Museum of the Peasants' and Workers' School. Notice photo of Nosaka Sanzo in the top row of photographs.

The Chinese Documentary series "Today in the History of the Anti-Japanese War" dedicated an episode to Sanzō Nosaka.

Sanzō Nosaka was featured in the "International Friends during the Anti-Japanese War", a show organized by the Beijing People's Association for Friendship with Foreign Countries. The show "feature[d] 160 pictures of 39 foreign friends who worked together with the Chinese people and made contributions to China's independence and freedom."

A statue of Nosaka is in the Jianchuan Museum.

== Other names ==
Nosaka used the pen names Okano Susumu and Lin Zhe.

== See also ==
- Japanese dissidence during the Shōwa period
- Japanese in the Chinese resistance to the Empire of Japan
- Wataru Kaji
- Hideo Noda
- Hotsumi Ozaki

== Works ==
- Sanzo Nosaka (Under the Name "Okano") (1933). Revolutionary Struggle of the Toiling Masses of Japan. Speech By Okano, 13th Plenum of the Executive Committee of the Communist International. Workers Library Publishers.
- Sanzo Nosaka (1921). A Brief Review of the Labour Movement in Japan. The International Council of Trade and Industrial Unions.
