= Mitsu Yashima =

Japanese artist, activist (1908–1988)

- 八島 光
- Mitsu Yashima in 1975
- Born: Tomoe Sasako; October 11, 1908; Innoshima, Hiroshima, Japan
- Died: December 7, 1988 (aged 80)
- Occupation(s): Children's book author, artist
- Spouse: Taro Yashima
- Children: 2, including Makoto Iwamatsu

Mitsu Yashima (八島 光, Yashima Mitsu, born Tomoe Sasako (笹子 智江, Sasako Tomoe); October 11, 1908 – December 7, 1988) was an artist, children's book author, and civic activist.

== Life ==
Mitsu was the daughter of a shipbuilding company executive. She attended Kobe College, and later enrolled at Bunka Gakuin in Tokyo. In the 1930s, she joined a Marxist study group, where she met her future husband, artist Taro Yashima. She and her husband painted farmers and laborers, and participated in exhibitions of art that critiqued Japan's military expansion and the government's increasingly heavy handed suppression of dissent. She and her husband were later imprisoned and brutalized by the Tokkō (special higher police) in response to their antiwar, anti-Imperialist, and anti-militarist stance in the 1930s. Their lives from this time are depicted in her husband's picture books, published in English, The New Sun and Horizon is Calling.

Mitsu and Taro's son Makoto Iwamatsu was born in 1933. He would eventually become a renowned actor and voice actor. In 1939 she and Taro went to America so that Taro could avoid conscription into the Japanese Army and to study art. After the attack on Pearl Harbor, Mitsu joined the U.S. war effort, working for the Office of Strategic Services by sending American propaganda to the Japanese. She adopted the pseudonym Mitsu Yashima during the war.

Following the war in 1948, Mitsu and Taro had a daughter Momo, who also appeared in their children's books. The family moved from New York to Los Angeles in 1954, where she and Taro opened an art institute. With Taro, she co-wrote the children's books Plenty to Watch in 1954 and Momo's Kitten in 1961.

Mitsu left Taro in the 1960s and moved to San Francisco, where she devoted herself to art and community work as well as civic activism. In 1976, she appeared in the television movie adaptation of the book Farewell to Manzanar, acting opposite her son and daughter.

In declining health, she moved back to Los Angeles in 1983 and lived with her daughter until her death on December 7, 1988.

== See also ==
- Japanese dissidence during the Shōwa period
