= Umeko =

- Gender: Female

Origin
- Origin: Japanese
- Meaning: Different meanings depending on the kanji used

Umeko (written: 梅子 lit. "plum tree, child", or ウメ子) is a feminine Japanese given name. Notable people with the name include:

- Umeko Ando (安東 ウメ子; 1932–2004), Japanese musician
- Tsuda Umeko (津田 梅子; 1864–1929), Japanese educator

== Fictional characters ==
- Umeko Kojima (小島 梅子), a character in the visual novel Maji de Watashi ni Koi Shinasai!
- Umeko / Ninjara, a character in the Teenage Mutant Ninja Turtles series
