= Teru Hasegawa =

Japanese, esperantist, antifascist (1912-1947)

- 長谷川テル
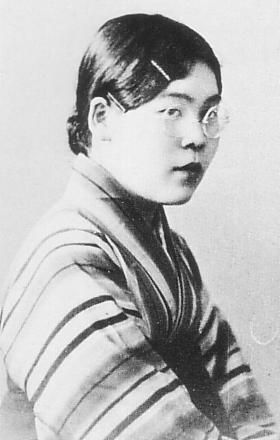
- Born: Hasegawa Teruko (長谷川照子); March 7, 1912; Japan
- Died: January 14, 1947 (aged 34)
- Other name: “Verda Majo” (Green May)

Teru Hasegawa (長谷川テル, Hasegawa Teru) (7 March 1912 – 10 January 1947 or 14 January 1947) was a Japanese Esperantist, also known by her Esperanto pen name Verda Majo (green May).

== Life ==
Teru Hasegawa was born Hasegawa Teruko (長谷川照子) in 1912 as the second of three children. In 1929 she enrolled at the Women's College of Education in Nara prefecture. She became acquainted to leftist literary circles, and Esperantist circles. She married Liu Ren, who was from Manchuria, in 1936. In April 1937 she went to China. She joined the Chinese resistance to Japan, where she made broadcasts aimed at the Japanese Army.

== See also ==
- Japanese dissidence during the Shōwa period
- Japanese in the Chinese resistance to the Empire of Japan
