= Shigeo Tsutsui =

Tsutsui (right) and his older brother

Shigeo Tsutsui (筒井 重雄, Tsutsui Shigeo; 11 October 1920 – 2014) was a Japanese soldier who joined the Chinese Eighth Route Army.

== Biography ==
Tsutsui was born in Gunma Prefecture on 11 October 1920. He joined the Imperial Japanese Army and was stationed in Nanjing in an aviation unit. In January 1945, he was captured by the Eighth Route Army. He joined the Japanese People's Emancipation League. Tsutsui stayed in China. He helped found the Chinese People's Liberation Army's first flying school.

Tsutsui returned to Japan in 1958, and became a farmer. He is survived by his son Kenji Tsutsui.
