= Japanese People's Emancipation League =

World War II resistance movement

- Japanese: 日本人民解放連盟; Chinese: 日本人民解放聯盟
- Flag of the Japanese People's Emancipation League

- Flag of the Yan'an branch of the JPE League
- Abbreviation: JPEL
- Predecessor: Japanese People's Anti-war Alliance; League to Raise the Political Consciousness of Japanese Troops
- Formation: 1944; 82 years ago
- Founded at: Yan'an, Northern Shaanxi
- Dissolved: 1945; 81 years ago
- Purpose: Political re-education of Japanese POWs and civilians; Opposition to the Sino-Japanese War and Japanese militarism; Disseminating propaganda and engaging in psychological warfare; Promotion of people's democracy
- Leader: Sanzo Nosaka
- Key people: Shigeo Tsutsui
- Affiliations: Japanese Communist Party; Chinese Communist Party

A former Japanese POW, now an Emancipation League member in an Eighth Route Army uniform (photo taken by Harrison Forman)

Illustration of Allied countries strangling Hideki Tojo. Flags representing United Kingdom, Republic of China, the Japanese People's Emancipation League, and the United States are pictured on the sleeves of each hand.

The Japanese People's Emancipation League (日本人民解放連盟, Nippon Jinmin Kaihō Renmei; JPEL), also Japanese People's Liberation Alliance and "Free Japan" (similarly to "Free Germany"), was an organization formed of the Japanese prisoners of war and anti-war activists with the support of the Japanese and Chinese Communist parties in the Communist-controlled China in 1944, during the Second Sino-Japanese War and World War II. The declared aims of the organisation were the withdrawal of Japanese troops from all occupied territories, the overthrow of the statist militarist system in the Empire of Japan and the establishment of a "democratic people's government". Its members participated in propaganda and military activities during the war.

== Background ==
The earlier attempts of the Japanese and Chinese Communists to form Communist-led anti-war movements were the short-lived Japanese People's Anti-war Alliance and League to Raise the Political Consciousness of Japanese Troops.

== Activities from 1944-5 ==
In 1944, the Japanese People's Emancipation League was established in Yan'an at the suggestion of Sanzo Nosaka. The People's Emancipation League is composed of Japanese who have voluntarily surrendered to the Chinese communists and of anti-fascist refugees. Mao Zedong, Zhu De, Nosaka (under the name Susumu Okano), and other CCP leaders participated in the inaugural assembly of the Emancipation League. Zhu De called the foundation of the Emancipation League the starting point of a new Chinese-Japanese relationship, predicting that when the Emancipation League's struggle resulted in the establishment of a "people's government" in Japan, China and Japan would then become "genuinely cordial and reciprocal friends".

The Japanese People's Emancipation League absorbed the less effectual Japanese Anti-War League in numerous places. The Japanese People's Emancipation League has a unit in Shangtung Province.

The Japanese POWs were given a choice either to stay in the border region or to return to their lines; after choosing the first, they would be invited to the join the Emancipation League. Those who chose to return to their own lines were given farewell parties and were provided with traveling expenses and guides. Of the 3,000-odd deserters or prisoners taken by the Chinese communists from the outset of the war until the middle of 1944, only about 325 decided to remain with the Eighth Route Army. The Emancipation League had a three-point program: "opposition to the war, the overthrow of the militarists, and the establishment of a democratic, people's government in postwar Japan". The Emancipation League was formed primarily to influence the character of Japan's postwar development. The Emancipation League was open to people with any kinds of political beliefs, requiring only the "agreement with the basic program advocating the end of the war, the overthrow of the militarists and the establishment of a democratic Japan with improved conditions for peasants, industrial laborers and small business men" of its members. They did not call them prisoners after they joined the Emancipation League. On July 12, 1944, it was reported that some league members were already serving in the Eighth Route Army as psychological warfare staff and instructors in Japanese methods of war.

The Emancipation League did not aspire to become the post-war government of Japan, but described itself as a mere organ of the Japanese anti-war movement, calling for an immediate cessation of the war and withdrawal of Japanese troops from all occupied territories including Manchukuo, and the establishment of democratic government, denying that the fall of the monarchy and zaibatsu trusts were its goals and hoping to overthrow the government before the Allied occupation of Japan, making the latter unnecessary.

The League had a growing influence among the Japanese armies and residents in occupied China, and in anti-militarist groups in Japan. According to Okano, "The league's policy [was] to divide Japan's ruling classes by concentrating all propaganda against the militarists, instead of uniting the rulers by premature agitation against the Emperor, who can easily be dealt with when the militarists are defeated from within and without. Beyond that the only aim of the League and the Japanese Communist Party is democracy, since Japan is not ripe for a Communists' revolution. The intent force of our party is still great, in spite of suppression."

John K. Emmerson stated that the Emancipation League's declared principles are democratic, and that it is not identified with the Communist Party. However, the Emancipation League would be characterized by the United States House Committee on Foreign Affairs as a Communist organization.

A Life magazine article on December 18, 1944, titled "Inside Red China From remote, inaccessible Yenan comes an account of Communist resistance against merciless Japanese by Teddy White" reported that the Japanese People's Emancipation League numbered more than 300 active members. John K. Emmerson reported on November 7, 1944, that the Emancipation League had an estimated membership of 450 Japanese prisoners in north and central China.

The Japanese Army allegedly sent half a dozen assassins into the Yenan area to poison Okano and disrupt the activities of the Emancipation League. Six JPEL members were accused of being commissioned by the Japanese secret service to "surrender" to the Eight Route Army in order to destroy the organisation from within.

The Japanese People's Emancipation League had over 20 branches all over the Chinese Liberated Areas.

In the last months of World War II, the Japanese American Committee for Democracy, a Japanese-American organization in the United States, sponsored the Japanese People's Emancipation League. In 1945, the JACD published "Japanese People's Emancipation League: its program and activities. A Japanese people's movement for a democratic Japan".

== Activities after World War II ==
After the surrender of Japan, the Japanese People's Emancipation League was involved in managing Japanese POWs in China and was responsible for the Tonghua incident, in which about 3,000 Japanese civilians were packed into a small room and killed.

== See also ==
- Japanese dissidence during the Shōwa period
- Japanese in the Chinese resistance to the Empire of Japan
- National Committee for a Free Germany
- Anti-Fascist Committee for a Free Germany
- Committee for the Liberation of the Peoples of Russia
