= Taro Yashima =

Japanese-American political dissident, artist, and children's book author

- 八島 太郎
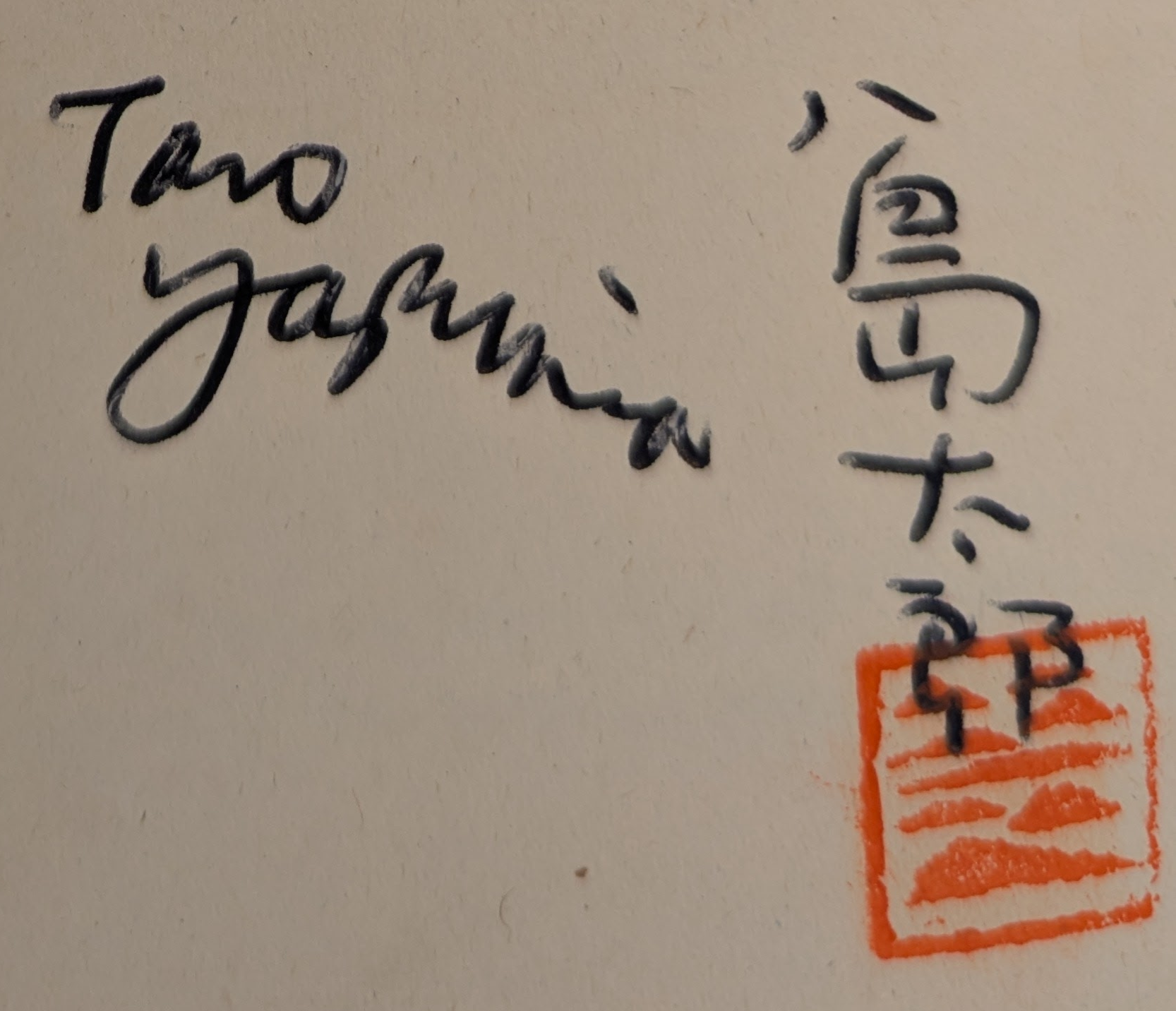
- Born: Atsushi Iwamatsu; September 21, 1908; Nejime, Kagoshima, Japan
- Died: June 30, 1994 (aged 85); Glendale, California
- Occupations: Children's book author, artist
- Spouse: Mitsu Yashima
- Children: Chihiro Isa, Mako Iwamatsu, Momo Yashima

Taro Yashima (八島 太郎, Yashima Tarō; born Atsushi Iwamatsu (岩松 淳, Iwamatsu Atsushi); September 21, 1908 — June 30, 1994) was a Japanese-American artist and children's book author. He immigrated to the United States in 1939 and assisted the U.S. war effort.

== Early life ==
Iwamatsu was born September 21, 1908, in Nejime, Kimotsuki District, Kagoshima, and raised there on the southern coast of Kyushu. His father was a country doctor who collected oriental art and encouraged art in his son. He graduated from Kagoshima Prefectural Daini-Kagoshima Middle School (now Kagoshima Prefectural Konan High School).

After studying for three years at Tokyo Fine Arts School (now the Faculty of Fine Arts, Tokyo University of the Arts), Iwamatsu was expelled for insubordination and for missing a military drill. He then joined a group of progressive artists, sympathetic to the struggles of ordinary workers and opposed to the rise of Japanese militarism. The antimilitarist movement in Japan was highly active at the time within many Japanese professional and crafts groups. Artists' posters protesting the Japanese aggression in China were widespread. Following the Japanese invasion of Manchuria in 1931, however, the Japanese government began heavy handed suppression of domestic dissent including the use of arrests and torture by the Tokkō (Special Higher Police).

Both Iwamatsu and his pregnant wife, Tomoe, were imprisoned and brutalized for their opposition to the militaristic government. In 1939, they left Japan for the United States so Iwamatsu could avoid conscription into the Japanese Army and so both Iwamatsu and Tomoe could study art. They left behind their son Mako (born 1933).

After Pearl Harbor, Iwamatsu joined the U.S. Army and went to work as an artist for the United States Office of War Information (OWI) and, later, for the Office of Strategic Services (OSS). It was then that he first used the pseudonym Taro Yashima, out of fear that there would be repercussions for Mako and other family members if the Japanese government knew of his employment. After the war, he and his wife were granted permanent resident status by an act of the U.S. Congress. Soon after they had another child, Momo, while living in New York City. Iwamatsu was able to return to Japan and bring Mako back to the United States in 1949.

== Career as illustrator and author ==
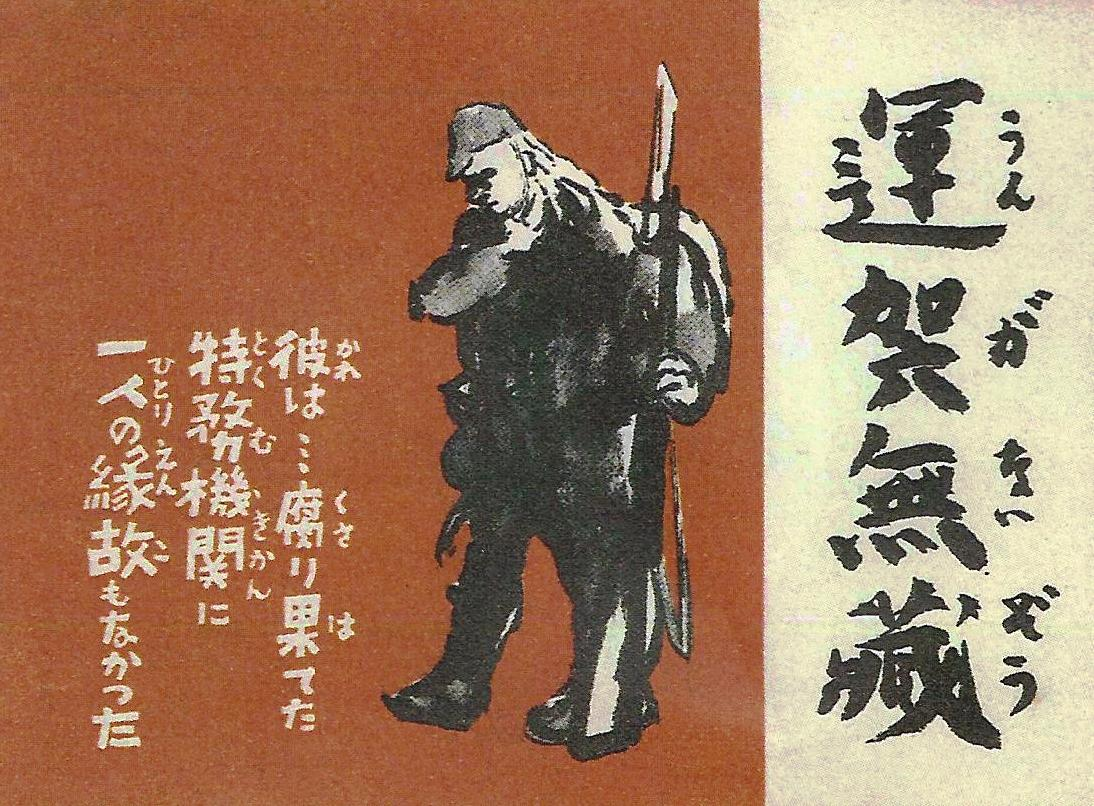
Yashima painted this propaganda leaflet, which was used by the U.S. Armed Forces in the Pacific War.

The New Sun, published in 1943 under the name Taro Yashima, was a 310-page autobiographical picture book for adults about life in pre-war statist Shōwa Japan, including details of the harsh and inhumane treatment that he and his wife underwent for participation in anti-militarist groups in the 1930s.

Its sequel, Horizon is Calling (published in 1947) was in a similar format—usually one picture per page, with one or two lines of text. The 276-page book continues the story of his life in Japan under military rule, this time with added Japanese text. In the book, Yashima describes the operations of the Tokkō and the ongoing industrialization of Japan for war in the 1930s. During one passage, he mourns the loss of his esteemed teacher "Mr. Isobe", who had been killed in action after being drafted into military service. A kindly teacher of the same name also appears in Yashima's award-winning children's book from 1955, Crow Boy. The book concludes with musings about leaving Japan to study art overseas.

Yashima began writing and illustrating children's books early in the 1950s, under the same pseudonym he had used in the OSS. His children's book Crow Boy won the Children's Book Award in 1955. The picture books Crow Boy (1955), Umbrella (1958), and Seashore Story (1967) were all runners-up for the Caldecott Medal, and they were later designated as Caldecott Honor Books. The annual award recognizes illustrators of the "most distinguished American picture book for children".

In 1963, on the topic of writing for children, Yashima wrote "Let children enjoy living on this earth, let children be strong enough not to be beaten or twisted by evil on this earth”.

Yashima returned to his home village of Nejime, visiting childhood classmates and familiar scenes that he depicted in several of his children's picture books. He and filmmaker Glenn Johnson produced a 26-minute documentary in 1971, hosted and narrated by Yashima, entitled Taro Yashima's Golden Village.

== Published works ==
- The New Sun (1943)
- Horizon is Calling (1947)
- The Village Tree (1953)
- Plenty to Watch (1954) by Mitsu and Taro Yashima
- Crow Boy (1955)
- Umbrella (1958)
- Momo's Kitten (1961) by Mitsu and Taro Yashima, illustrated by Taro Yashima
- Youngest One (1962)
- Seashore Story (1967)

== Personal life ==
The Yashimas moved from New York to Los Angeles in 1954, where they opened an art institute.

He was the father of renowned actor and voice actor Mako Iwamatsu and actress Momo Yashima. He was also the biological father of writer Chihiro Isa (伊佐千尋).

Yashima died in Glendale Memorial Hospital in 1994.
