= Political dissidence in the Empire of Japan =

Overview from 1868 to 1947

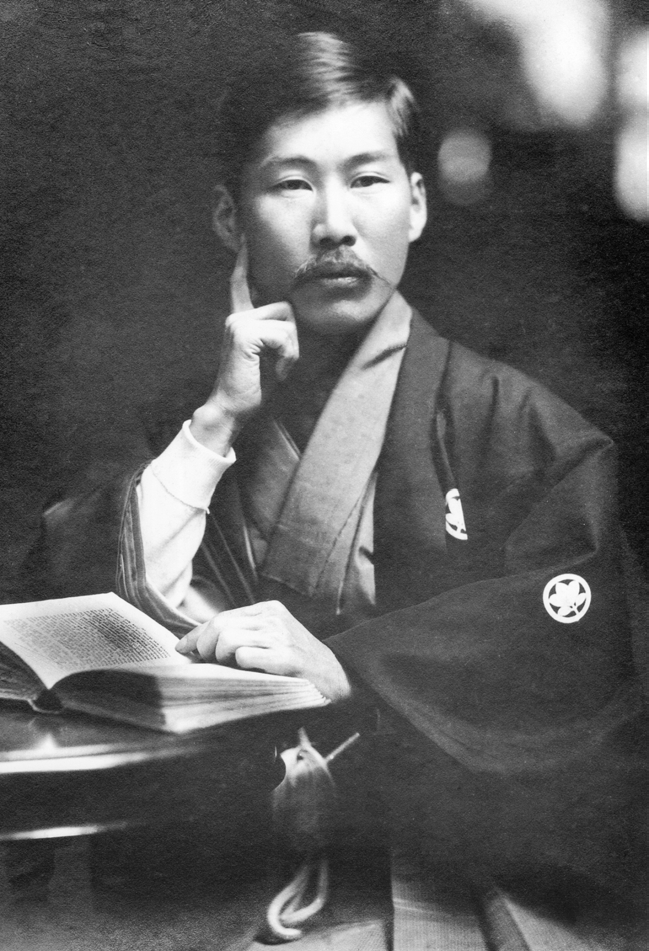
Kotoku Shusui, an early Japanese anarchist

Political dissidence in the Empire of Japan covers individual Japanese dissidents against the policies of the Empire of Japan.

== Dissidence in the Meiji and Taishō eras ==
=== High Treason Incident ===
Shūsui Kōtoku, a Japanese anarchist, was critical of imperialism. He would write Imperialism: The Specter of the Twentieth Century in 1901. In 1911, twelve people, including Kōtoku, were executed for their involvement in the High Treason Incident, a failed plot to assassinate Emperor Meiji. Also executed for involvement with the plot was Kanno Suga, an anarcho-feminist and former common-law wife of Kōtoku.

=== Fumiko Kaneko and Park Yeol ===
Fumiko Kaneko was a Japanese anarchist who lived in Japanese-occupied Korea. She, along with a Korean anarchist, Park Yeol, were accused of attempting to procure bombs from a Korean independence group in Shanghai. Both of them were charged with plotting to assassinate members of the Japanese imperial family.

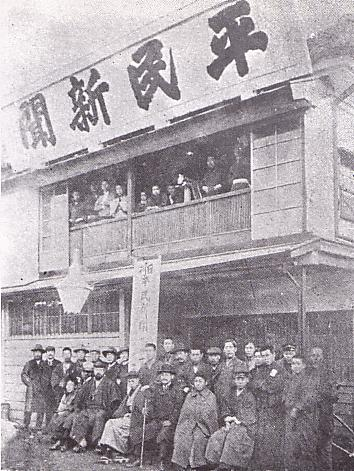
A photograph of the Heimin-sha (Commoners' Society), who published the Heimin Shimbun

=== Commoners' Newspaper ===
The Heimin Shimbun (Commoners' Newspaper) was a socialist newspaper which served as the leading anti-war vehicle during the Russo-Japanese War. It was a weekly mouthpiece of the socialist Heimin-sha (Society of Commoners). The chief writers were Kotoku Shusui and Sakai Toshihiko. When the Heimin decried the high taxes caused by the war, Sakai was sentenced to two months in jail. When the paper published The Communist Manifesto, Kotoku was given five months in prison, and the paper was shut down.

=== Buddhist resistance ===
Although the state of Japanese Buddhism during this time was generally one of servility to the Japanese authoritarian system, there were some exceptional individuals who resisted. Girō Senoo, a Nichiren Buddhist and Marxist, was arrested for opposing war and nationalism and was arrested in 1936 for these views. Uchiyama Gudō was a Sōtō Zen Buddhist priest and anarcho-socialist. He was one of a few Buddhist leaders who spoke out against Japanese imperialism. Uchiyama was an outspoken advocate for redistributive land reform, overturning the Meiji emperor system, encouraging conscripts to desert en masse, and advancing democratic rights for all. He criticized Zen leaders who claimed that low social position was justified by karma and who sold abbotships to the highest bidder.

After government persecution pushed the socialist and anti-war movements in Japan underground, Uchiyama visited Kōtoku Shūsui in Tokyo in 1908. He purchased equipment that would be used to set up a secret press in his temple. Uchiyama used the printing equipment to turn out popular socialist tracts and pamphlets, some of which were his own works. Uchiyama was executed, along with Kotoku, for their involvement with the attempted assassination of Emperor Meiji. Uchiyama's priesthood was revoked when he was convicted, but it was restored in 1993 by the Soto Zen sect.

Another Soto Zen critic of Japanese imperialism and militarism was Inoue Shūten. He is known for advocating Buddhist pacifism and for criticizing D.T. Suzuki's stance of Buddhism and war.

Among other notable individuals were the Zen masters Kōdō Sawaki, who expressed sentiments critical of war and its futility, and Sawaki's student Taisen Deshimaru, who was jailed for aiding the resistance efforts of Bangka Islanders against Japanese colonialists.

=== Attempted assassination of Hirohito ===
Daisuke Nanba, a Japanese student and communist, attempted to assassinate the Prince Regent Hirohito in 1923. Daisuke was outraged by the Kantō Massacre, a slaughter of Koreans and anarchists in the aftermath of the 1923 Great Kantō earthquake. The dead included his partner, anarchist Ōsugi Sakae, feminist Noe Itō, and Ōsugi's six-year-old nephew, who were murdered by Masahiko Amakasu, the future head of the Manchukuo Film Association, a film production company based in the Japanese puppet state of Manchukuo. This event was known as the Amakasu incident. Nanba was found guilty by the Supreme Court of Japan and hanged in November 1924.

=== Osaka Incident ===
Hideko Fukuda was considered the "Joan of Arc" of the Freedom and People's Rights Movement in Japan during the 1880s. She was also an editor of Sekai fujin (Women of the World), a socialist women's paper that Shūsui Kōtoku contributed articles to. In 1885, Fukuda was arrested for her involvement in the Osaka incident, a failed plan to supply explosives to Korean independence movements.

The Osaka Incident sought to overthrow the Meiji government via simultaneous open revolt in various parts of Japan. Part of the plan also included assisting Korean independence activists in a coup against conservatives in the Korean monarchy. Before the plan was able to be implemented, the police arrested the conspirators and confiscated the weapons before they could leave Japan for Korea. Other participants in the plan included Oi Kentaro, another major figure of the Freedom and People's Rights Movement. The outlaw brotherhood Gen'yōsha was also a major participant.

=== Liberal and moderate resistance ===
There were some critics of militarism among more mainstream socio-political circles, such as classical liberals and moderate conservatives. Saionji Kinmochi, who was the last of the genrō, an imperial advisor with progressive views, and a three-time prime minister, was known to be among the aristocrats who were most supportive of parliamentary government and often clashed with the military throughout his lengthy career, leading him to be considered as a potential assassination target leading up to the failed 1936 coup d'état. Future Prime Minister and then-Foreign Minister Kijūrō Shidehara became known for his "Shidehara diplomacy" in the 1920s, favoring non-interventionism in China and warmer relations with the Anglo-American world.

=== Japanese political refugees in early 20th century America ===
The American West Coast, which had a large Japanese population, was a haven for Japanese political dissidents in the early 20th century. Many were refugees from the "Freedom and People's Rights Movement." San Francisco, and Oakland in particular, were teeming with such people. In 1907, an open letter addressed to "Mutsuhito, Emperor of Japan from Anarchists-Terrorists" was posted at the Consulate General of Japan in San Francisco. As Mutsuhito was the personal name of Emperor Meiji, and it was considered rude to call the emperor by his personal name, this was quite an insult. The letter began with, "We demand the implementation of the principle of assassination." The letter also claimed that the emperor was not a god. The letter concluded with, "Hey you, miserable Mutsuhito. Bombs are all around you, about to explode. Farewell to you." This incident changed the Japanese government's attitude of leftist movements.

== Early Shōwa era and the rise of militarism ==
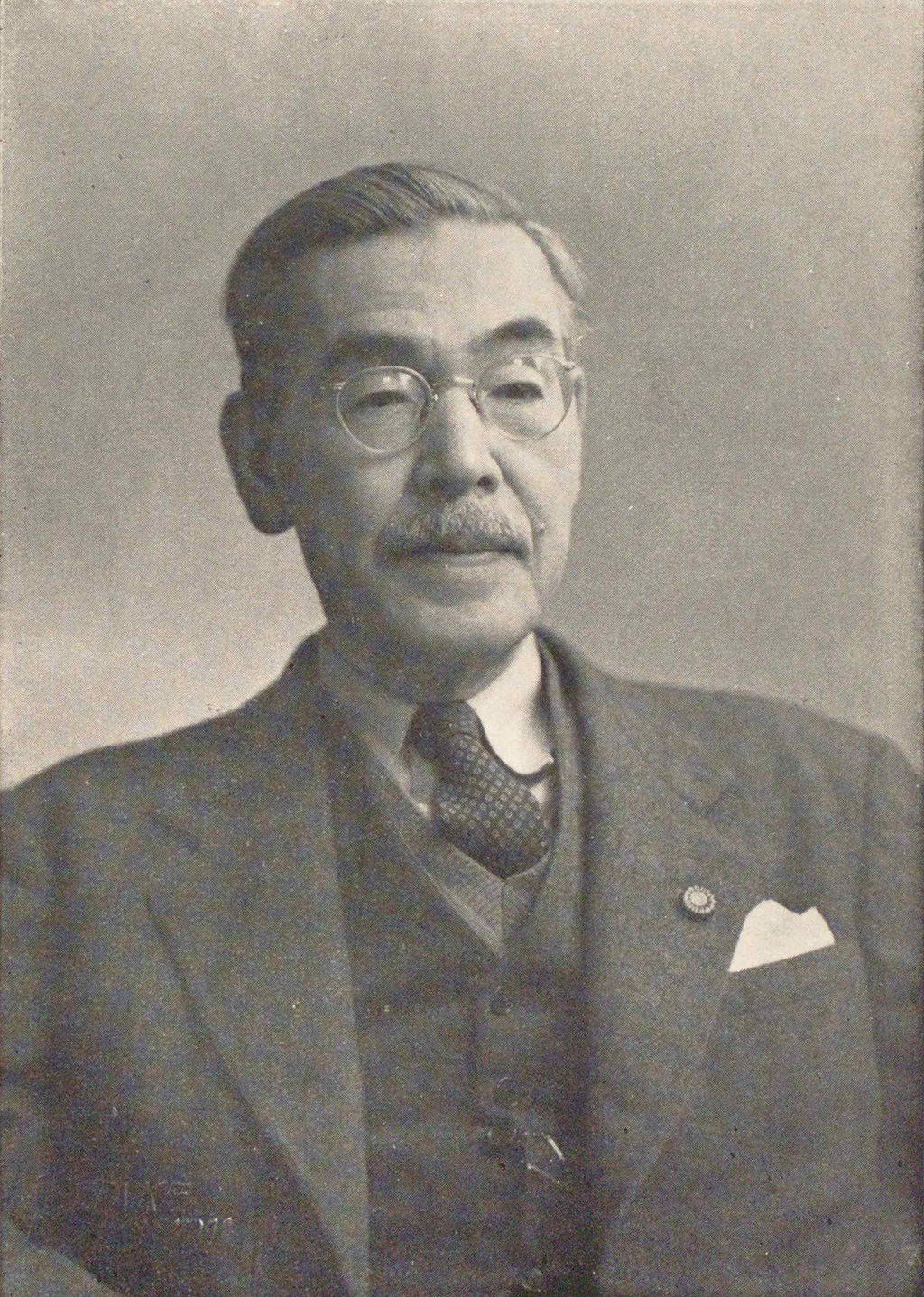
Ikuo Oyama, member of the banned Labour-Farmer Party

=== Ikuo Oyama ===
Ikuo Oyama was a member of the left-leaning Labour-Farmer Party, which advocated universal suffrage, minimum wages, and women's rights. Yamamoto Senji, a colleague of his, was assassinated on February 29, on the same day as he had presented testimony in the Diet regarding torture of prisoners. The Labour-Farmer Party was banned in 1928 due to accusations of having links to communism. Oyama fled Japan in 1933 to the United States as a result. He got a job at Northwestern University at its library and political science department. During his exile, he worked closely with the U.S. Government against the Empire of Japan. Oyama happily shook hands with Zhou Enlai, who fought the Japanese in the Second Sino-Japanese War. Oyama was given a Stalin Award prize on December 20, 1951. However, his colleagues begged him not to accept the award for fear that he would become a Soviet puppet. Some of his oldest friends abandoned him when he accepted it.

=== Modern girls ===
Modern girls (モダンガール, modan gāru) were Japanese women who adhered to Westernized fashions and lifestyles in the 1920s. They were the equivalent of America's flappers.

This period was characterized by the emergence of young working-class women with access to consumer goods and the money to buy those consumer goods. Modern girls were depicted as living in cities, being financially and emotionally independent, choosing their own suitors, and being apathetic towards politics. Thus, the modern girl was a symbol of Westernization. However, after a military coup in 1931, extreme Japanese nationalism and the Great Depression prompted a return to the 19th-century ideal of good wife, wise mother.

=== Salon de thé François ===
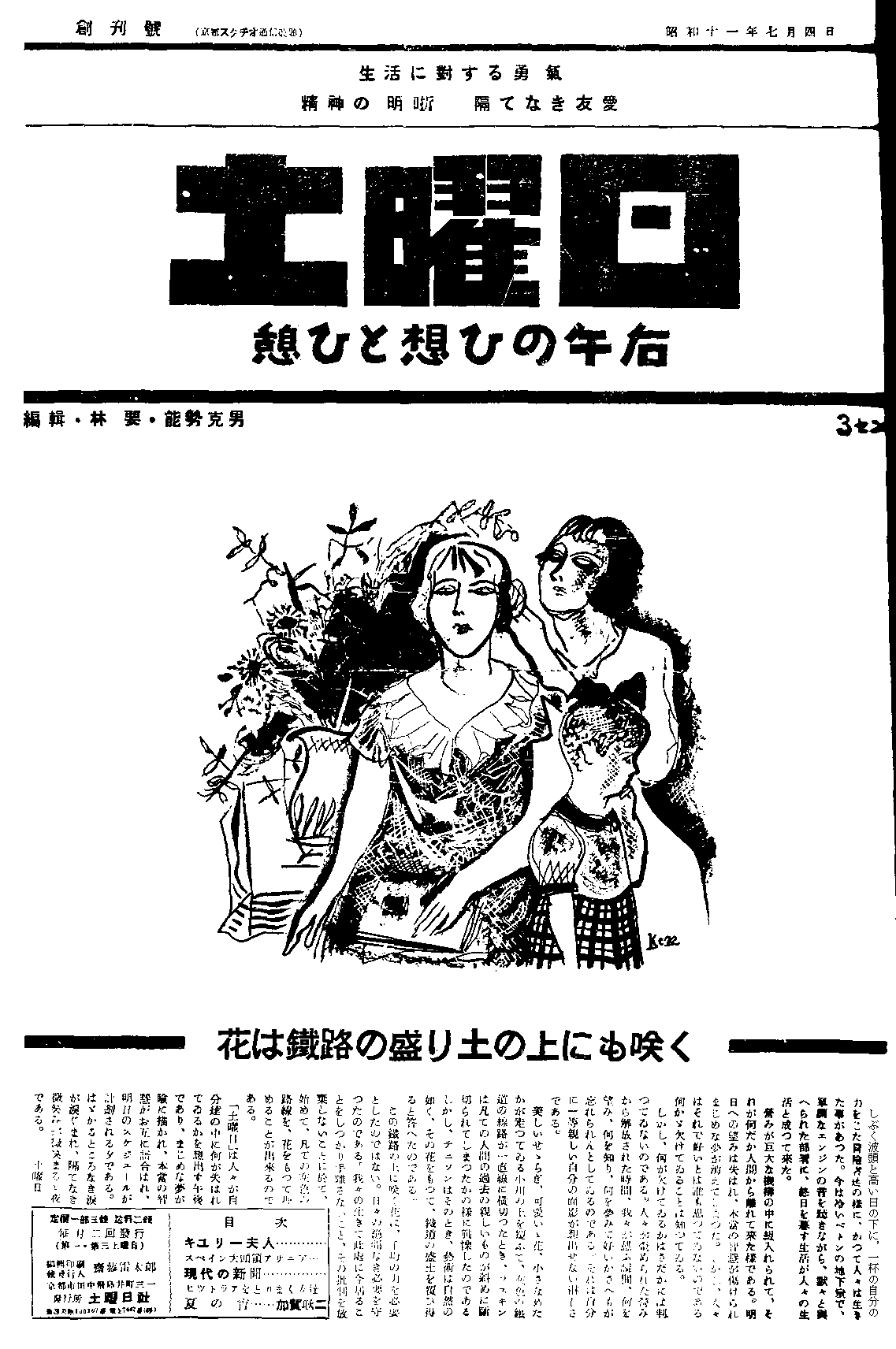
Cover page of first issue of the anti-fascist Doyōbi ("Saturday") newspaper, July 7, 1936

The Salon de thé François was a western-style café established in Kyoto in 1934 by Shoichi Tateno, who participated in labour movements, and anti-war movements. The cafe was a secret source of funds for the then-banned Japanese Communist Party. The anti-fascist newspaper Doyōbi was edited and distributed from the café.

=== Takigawa Incident ===
In March 1933, the Japanese parliament attempted to control various education groups and circles. The Interior Ministry banned two textbooks on criminal laws written by Takigawa Yukitoki of Kyoto Imperial University. The following month, Konishi Shigenao, president of Kyoto University, was requested to dismiss Professor Takigawa. Konishi rejected the request, but due to pressure from the military and nationalist groups, Takigawa was fired from the university. This led to all 39 faculty members of Kyoto Imperial University's law faculty resigning. Furthermore, students boycotted classes and communist sympathizers organized protests. The Ministry of Education was able to suppress the movement by firing Konishi. In addition to this attempt by the Japanese government to control educational institutions, during the term of the education minister, Ichirō Hatoyama, a number of elementary school teachers were also dismissed for having what were considered "dangerous thoughts".

=== Soaring Mast ===
Following the outbreak of the 1931 Japanese invasion of Manchuria, the Japanese Communist Party had infiltrated the military, including in Tokyo, and Osaka. They would distribute leaflets, and newspapers opposing the war. Sakaguchi Kiichiro, a Japanese Communist sailor, founded the anti-war "The Soaring Mast" along with other anti-sailors. Six issues were produced and distributed. Sakaguchi Kiichiro had enlisted in the Imperial Japanese Navy following his graduation from High School. During his service, he joined the Japanese Communist Party. Saakaguchi Kiichiro would be arrested in a Police raid in Tokyo. He was tortured in Hiroshima Prison by the Special Higher police. He would die in prison in 1933.

== Dissidence during World War II ==
=== Japanese working with the Chinese resistance ===
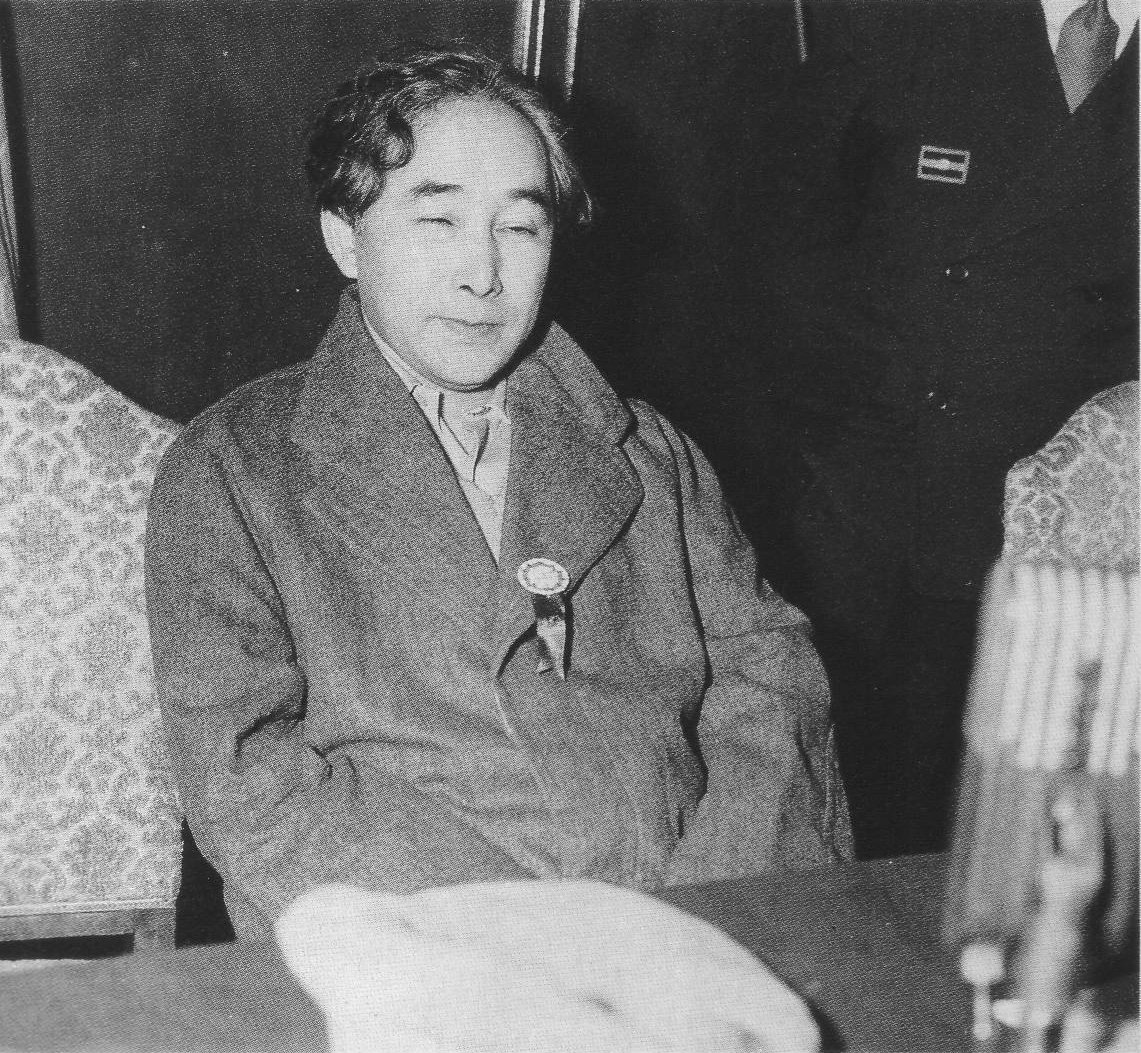
Kaji Wataru

Kaji Wataru was a Japanese proletarian writer who lived in Shanghai. His wife, Yuki Ikeda, suffered through torture at the hands of the Imperial Japanese. She fled Japan when she was very young, working as a ballroom dancer in Shanghai to earn a living. They were friends with Chinese cultural leader Guo Moruo. Kaji and Yuki would escape Shanghai when the Japanese invaded the city. Kaji, along with his wife, were involved with the re-education of captured Japanese soldiers for the Kuomintang in Chongqing during the Second Sino-Japanese War.

His relationship with Chiang Kai-shek was troubled due to Chiang Kai-shek's anti-communism. Kaji would work with the United States Office of Strategic Services in the later stages of the war. However, the relationship between Kaji Wataru and the United States would sour after the war. During the US occupation of Japan, Kaji would be kidnapped and tortured by the CIA for alleged ties to Soviet Intelligence.

Sanzō Nosaka, a founder of the Japanese Communist Party, worked with the Chinese Communists in Yan'an during the Second Sino-Japanese war. He was in charge of the re-education of captured Japanese troops. Japanese Intelligence in China were desperate to eliminate him, but they always failed in their attempts. Sanzo went by the name "Susumu Okano" during the war. Today, Sanzō Nosaka is considered a disgraced figure to the Japanese Communist Party, when it was discovered that he falsely accused Kenzō Yamamoto, a Japanese communist, of spying for Japan. Joseph Stalin executed Yamamoto in 1939.

Several anti-war organizations would be founded in China during the war. Led by exiled Japanese communists, and consisting mainly of Japanese POWs who defected to the Chinese resistance. Including Kaji Wataru's Anti-War League and Nosaka Sanzo's Japanese People's Emancipation League.

Sato Takeo was a Japanese doctor who was a member of Norman Bethune's medical team in the Second-Sino Japanese War. Norman's team was responsible for giving medical care to soldiers of the Chinese Eighth Route Army.

=== Japanese working with the United States ===
Taro Yashima (real name Atsushi Iwamatsu), an artist, joined a group of progressive artists, sympathetic to the struggles of ordinary workers and opposed to the rise of Japanese militarism in the early 1930s. The antimilitarist movement in Japan was highly active at the time, with posters protesting the Japanese aggression in China being widespread. Following the Japanese invasion of Manchuria, however, the Japanese government began heavy handed suppression of domestic dissent including the use of arrests and torture by the Tokkō (special higher police). Iwamatsu who was thrown into a Japanese prison without trial along with his pregnant wife, Tomoe Sasako, for protesting militarism in Japan. Conditions in the prison were deplorable and the two were subjected to inhumane treatment including beatings. The authorities demanded false confessions, and those who gave them were set free.

Iwamatsu and Sasako came to America using student visas to study art in 1939, leaving behind their son, Makoto Iwamatsu, who would grow up to be a prolific actor in America, with relatives. When WWII broke out, Iwamatsu joined the Office of Strategic Services as a painter. He would adopt the pseudonym Taro Yashima, to protect his son who was still in Japan. Iwamatsu would continue to use his pseudonym when he wrote children's books, such as Crow Boy, after the war.

Eitaro Ishigaki was an issei painter who immigrated to America from Taiji, Wakayama, in Japan. At the outbreak of the Second Sino-Japanese War, and the Pacific War, he painted anti-war, and anti-fascist artwork. His painting Man on the Horse (1932) depicted a plain-clothed Chinese guerrilla confronting the Japanese army, heavily equipped with airplanes and warships. It became the cover of New Masses, an American communist journal. Flight (1937) was a painting that depicted two Chinese women escaping Japanese bombing, running with three children past one man lying dead on the ground. During the war, he worked for the United States Office of War Information along with his wife, Ayako.

Yasuo Kuniyoshi was an issei (first-generation Japanese immigrant) anti-fascist painter based in New York. In 1942, he raised funds for the United China Relief to provide humanitarian aid to China when it was still at war with Japan. Time magazine ran an article featuring Yasuo Kuniyoshi, George Grosz, a German anti-Nazi painter, and Jon Corbino, an Italian painter, standing behind large unflattering caricatures of Hirohito, Hitler, and Mussolini. Yasuo Kuniyoshi showed opposition to Tsuguharu Foujita's art show at the Kennedy Galleries. During WWII, Tsuguharu Foujita painted propaganda artwork for the Empire of Japan. Yasuo called Foujita a fascist, an imperialist, and an expansionist. Yasuo Kuniyoshi would work for the Office of War Information during WWII, creating artwork that depicted atrocities committed by the Empire of Japan, even though he was himself labeled an "enemy alien" in the aftermath of Pearl Harbor.

During the war, Ray Cromley, a member of the United States Dixie Mission, had discussed plans with Nosaka Sanzo, and another Japanese Communist in Yenan named Sawada, to send Japanese Communists as agents to Manchuria and Japan. Sawada (Full Name Jun Sawada) was a veteran Communist from Japan, who had smuggled himself into North China in 1943 after his release from prison. Cromley talked with Sawada about the practicality of sending an agent, possibly Sawada himself, to Japan, and the chances of establishing a direct line of communication with the Japanese underground.

=== Japanese working with the British ===
Shigeki Oka was an issei socialist and journalist for the Yorozu Chōhō, and a friend of Kōtoku Shūsui or Toshihiko Sakai. Oka would welcome Kotoku when he arrived in Oakland. He was a member of the Sekai Rodo Domeikai (World Labour League). In 1943, the British Army hired Shigeki Oka to print propaganda materials in Kolkata in India, such as the Gunjin Shimbun (Soldier Newspaper).

The SOAS, University of London was used by the British Army to train soldiers in Japanese. The teachers were usually Japanese citizens who had stayed in Britain during the war, as well as Canadian Nisei. When the Government Code and Cypher School at Bletchley Park was concerned about the slow pace of the SOAS, started their own Japanese language courses in Bedford in February 1942. The courses were directed by Royal Army cryptographer, Col. John Tiltman, and retired Royal Navy officer, Captain. Oswald Tuck.

=== Sorge spy ring ===
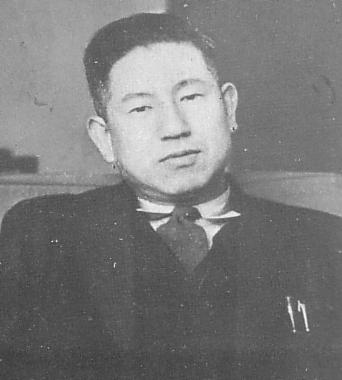
Hotsumi Ozaki

Richard Sorge was a Soviet military intelligence officer who conducted surveillance in both Germany and Japan, working under the identity of a Japanese correspondent for the German newspaper Frankfurter Zeitung. He arrived in Yokohama in 1933 and recruited two journalists: Asahi Shimbun journalist Hotsumi Ozaki, who wanted successful communist revolutions in both China and Japan; and Yotoku Miyagi in 1932 who translated Japanese newspaper articles and reports into English and created a diverse network of informants.

In 1941, he relayed to the Soviet Union that Prime minister Konoe Fumimaro had decided against an immediate attack on the Soviets, choosing instead to keep forces in French Indochina (Vietnam). This information allowed the Soviet Union to reallocate tanks and troops to the western front without fear of Japanese attacks. Later that year, both Sorge and Ozaki were found guilty of treason (espionage) and were executed three years later in 1944.

=== Pacifist resistance ===
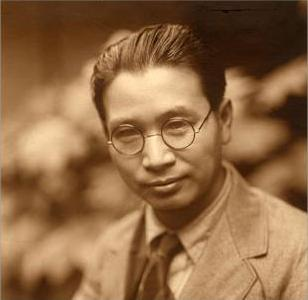
Kagawa Toyohiko, Christian pacifist

Pacifism was one of the many ideologies targeted by the Tokko. George Ohsawa, a pacifist and the founder of the macrobiotic diet, was thrown in jail for his anti-war activities in January 1945. While in prison, he suffered through harsh treatment. When he was finally released, one month after the bombing of Hiroshima, he was gaunt, crippled, and 80% blind. Toyohiko Kagawa, a Christian pacifist, was arrested in 1940 for apologizing to the Republic of China for Japan's occupation of China. Yanaihara Tadao, another Christian, circulated an anti-war magazine beginning in 1936 and through the end of the war.

=== Anti-fascist bulletins ===
Kiryū while working at Shinmai

The journalist Kiryū Yūyū published an anti-fascist bi-monthly magazine, Tazan no Ishi, but it was heavily censored and ceased publication with Kiryū's death in September 1941.

A lawyer named Masaki Hiroshi had more success with his independent bulletin called Chikaki yori. Masaki's main technique against the censors was simply masking his critiques of the government in thinly veiled sarcasm. This was apparently unnoticed by the censors, and he was able to continue publishing fierce attacks on the government through the end of the war. His magazine had many intellectual readers such as Hasegawa Nyozekan, Hyakken Uchida, Rash Behari Bose and Saneatsu Mushanokōji. After the war, Masaki became an idiosyncratic defense lawyer, successfully forcing many recognitions of police malpractice at great risk to his life.

A lesser known bulletin was Kojin konjin, a monthly critique of the army published by the humorist Ubukata Toshirō. Again, the use of satire without explicit call to political action allowed Ubukata to avoid prosecution through the end of the war, although two issues were banned. He ceased publication in 1968.

=== A Diary of Darkness ===
Kiyosawa Kiyoshi was an American-educated commentator on politics and foreign affairs who lived in a time when Japanese militarists rose to power. He wrote a diary as notes for a history of the war, but it soon became a refuge for him to criticize the Japanese government, and to express opinions he had to repress publicly. It chronicles growing bureaucratic control over everything from the press to people's clothing. Kiyosawa showed scorn towards Tojo and Koiso, lamenting the rise of hysterical propaganda, and related his own and his friends' struggles to avoid arrest. He also recorded the increasing poverty, crime, and disorder, tracing the gradual disintegration of Japan's war effort and the looming certainty of defeat. His diary was published under the name A Diary of Darkness: The Wartime Diary of Kiyosawa Kiyoshi, in 1948. It is today regarded as a classic.

=== Antiwar film ===
Fumio Kamei was arrested under the Peace Preservation Law after releasing two state-funded documentaries that, while purporting to be celebrations of Japan and its army, portrayed civilian victims of Japanese war crimes and mocked the "sacred war" message and "beautiful Japan" propaganda. He was released after the war and continued to make anti-establishment films.

=== Nisei involvement in Japanese resistance ===
Karl Yoneda was a nisei (second-generation Japanese immigrant) born in Glendale, California. Before World War II, he went to Japan to protest the Japanese invasion of China with Japanese militants. Toward the end of 1938 he was involved with protests of war cargo heading to Japan along with Chinese and Japanese militants. He would join the United States Military Intelligence Service in the war.

Koji Ariyoshi was a nisei sergeant in the U.S. Army during WWII, and an opponent of Japanese militarism. He was a member of the United States Dixie Mission, where he met Sanzo Nosaka and Mao Zedong. During the war, he also met with Kaji Wataru in Chongqing, hearing about him when he was in Burma. Koji Ariyoshi would form the Hawaii-China People's Friendship Association in 1972.

=== Buddhist resistance ===
The educator and Buddhist leader Tsunesaburo Makiguchi attributed the war Japan was experiencing to the acceptance of religious doctrines which he believed were false and slandered human life. Makiguchi cannot be considered as a political opponent to the government : in some of his writings, he emphasizes loyalty to the emperor, and he was never a critic of wartime Japanese aggression in the neighboring asian countries.

Though, his religious beliefs compelled him to disobey an important state law Consequently, he and the organization Soka Kyoiku Gakkai soon attracted the attention of the Special Higher Police, Japan's secret police force.

In 1942, a monthly magazine published by Makiguchi called Kachi Sōzō (価値創造, "Creating Value") was shut down by the government after only nine issues.

In 1943, Makiguchi and the lay organization were instrumental in persuading the Nichiren Shōshū priesthood with which their lay movement was aligned to refuse a government-sponsored mandate to merge with Nichiren Shū based on the Religious Organizations Law which had been established in 1939.

As the war progressed, the Japanese government ordered that Shinto a talisman be placed in every home and temple. Bowing to the government's demands, the Nichiren Shōshū priesthood agreed to accept the placing of a talisman inside its head temple. Defending what they saw as doctrinal purity, Makiguchi and the Soka Gakkai leadership openly refused. During his interrogation by the secret police, Makiguchi shared that his group had seditiously destroyed at least 500 of the talismans.

Makiguchi, his disciple Josei Toda, and nineteen other leaders of the Soka Kyoiku Gakkai were arrested on July 6, 1943, on charges of violating the Peace Preservation Law.

With its leadership decimated, the Soka Kyoiku Gakkai was forced to disband. The treatment in the Sugamo prison was harsh, and within a year, all but Makiguchi, Josei Toda, and one more director had recanted and been released..

On November 18, 1944, Makiguchi died of malnutrition in prison, at the age of 73. Toda was released after the war and rebuilt the lay organization together with his disciple Daisaku Ikeda. The movement for peace, culture and education spread worldwide and is known today as the Soka Gakkai International (SGI).

The details of Makiguchi's indictment and subsequent interrogation were covered in July, August, and October (1943) in classified monthly bulletins of the Special Higher Police. However, some historians have differing interpretations about Makiguchi's resistance to the government. Ramseyer postulated in 1965 that Makiguchi attracted the attention of the government's Special Police due to the aggressive propagation efforts of some of his followers. Other scholars, close to the Soka Gakkai, examining both Makiguchi's indictment and his interrogation records, and point to his consistent opposition to the existing government.

=== Conservative, centrist, and classical liberal resistance ===
Saitō Takao caused a stir in his time for delivering a fiery speech against the Sino-Japanese War, leading to his expulsion from the Diet. Kan Abe, the paternal grandfather of later Prime Minister Shinzo Abe, was elected to the Diet in 1942 on an anti-Hideki Tojo platform along with future Prime Minister Takeo Miki, who also secured election to the Diet in 1942 on an anti-Tojo platform through mutual assistance with Abe. Another future prime minister who opposed militarism was Tanzan Ishibashi, who spearheaded numerous articles and organisations before and during the war that opposed Japanese colonialism and illiberal authoritarian policies, being aided in his efforts by thinkers such as Kiyoshi Kiyosawa and Kisaburo Yokota.

== See also ==
- Japanese in the Chinese resistance to the Empire of Japan
- Japanese Resistance to the Imperial House of Japan
- Political prisoners in Imperial Japan
- Dissent in the Armed Forces of the Empire of Japan
- Relations between Japanese Revolutionaries and the Comintern and the Soviet Union
- List of Japanese dissidents in Imperial Japan
- Assassination attempts on Hirohito
- Popular Front Incident
- Japanese American service in World War II
- German resistance to Nazism
- Italian resistance
