= Kanno Sugako =

Japanese anarcha-feminist journalist (1881–1911)

- 管野 須賀子
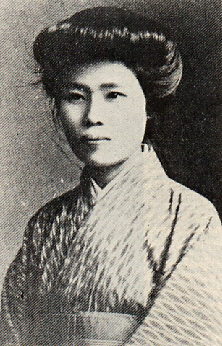
- Born: June 7, 1881; Osaka, Empire of Japan
- Died: January 25, 1911 (aged 29); Ichigaya, Tokyo, Empire of Japan
- Cause of death: Execution by hanging
- Other names: Suga, Oitako
- Known for: High Treason Incident
- Movement: Anarchism
- Spouse(s): Komiya Fukutaro; Arahata Kanson
- Motive: Anti-monarchism; Anti-imperialism
- Conviction: Treason
- Penalty: Death

Details
- Country: Japan
- Target: Emperor Meiji

Kanno Sugako (管野 須賀子; June 7, 1881 – January 25, 1911), also known as Kanno Suga (管野 スガ), was a Japanese anarcha-feminist journalist. She was the author of a series of articles about gender oppression, and a defender of freedom and equal rights for men and women.

In 1910, she was accused of treason by the Japanese government for her alleged involvement in what became known as the High Treason Incident, aimed at the assassination of Emperor Meiji. Kanno was executed by hanging on January 25, 1911, at the age of 29. Sugako was the only woman among the twelve accused given the death sentence in the High Treason trials, and the first woman with the status of political prisoner to be executed in the history of modern Japan.

== Biography ==
=== Early life ===
Kanno Sugako was born in Osaka in 1881. Her father, Kanno Yoshihige, owned a successful mining business, but it failed when Kanno was eight or nine years old. Kanno's mother died when she was ten years old, and her father remarried. She had a younger sister, named Hide, and a younger brother.

Kanno's first exposure to socialism was an essay by Sakai Toshihiko, in which Sakai advised rape victims not to carry the guilt of the event around. The essay motivated Kanno to read more of Sakai's writings, which then exposed her to other socialist thinkers.

In September 1899, at the age of seventeen, Kanno married Komiya Fukutarō, a member of a Tokyo merchant family. Kanno felt no physical or emotional attraction towards her new husband, but it allowed her to escape the harassment of her stepmother. Kanno was not particularly interested in business, preferring writing. Eventually, her stepmother left her family, and Kanno returned in 1902 to Osaka to care for her father.

=== Writing and Activism ===
While Kanno took care of her family, she became more familiar with the playwright Udagawa Bunkai, her brother's patron. She managed to impress Udagawa enough that he began helping her with her writing. Udagawa got Kanno a job with the Osaka Choho (Osaka Morning Paper) and gave her advice on how to improve her writing. She wrote a series of short stories, articles, and essays. She and Udagawa became close, with Udagawa visiting Kanno when she was hospitalized in November 1902, even taking care of her family. In turn, Kanno expressed her appreciation of Udagawa in Isshukan. It is often reported in recent sources that Kanno and Udagawa eventually became lovers, however, this is likely to be untrue.

In 1903, Kanno joined the Christian Yajima Kajiko's Fujin Kyofukai (Woman's Christian Temperance Union) due to a personal attraction to a shared belief in charity and reform. The society sought to end the public brothel system of Japan, attacking the institution through print. Earlier in 1903, Kanno attended a lecture where Shimada Saburo argued for the closing of the Osaka red light district. She met with Shimada and attended another socialist meeting where Kinoshita Naoe, a Christian socialist, discussed geisha entertainment at Kanno's request. Furthermore, she also met with her future lover, Kōtoku Shūsui. Kanno also began contributing to the Michi no Tomo (Tenrikyō) and Kirisutokyō Sekai (Protestant), both religious newspapers. In 1904, the Russo-Japanese War formally began. Kanno united with Christians and socialists in opposing the war, joining the Heminsha, led by Sakai and Kotoku. She was a reader of the Heimin Shinbun (Commoners' News), an anti-war magazine headed by Sakai and Kotoku, though she never submitted a contribution to it herself.

By 1905, Kanno and Udagawa became estranged from one another, due to Kanno's newfound association with the Women's Moral Reform Society, as the society was mounting a campaign against the system of concubines and advocating for the independence of women. In the same year, Kanno's father died in Kyoto on June 3. Her younger brother had already left to study abroad in the United States, so she was just left with her younger sister Hide.

In 1906, the authorities jailed Mori Saian, editor of the Wakayama Prefecture newspaper Muro Shinpō (Muro News), for insulting the authorities. Sakai contacted Kanno about temporarily editing Muro Shinpō, though Kanno was initially reluctant as she had just dedicated herself to a new position. Sakai dispatched Kanno's future common-law husband, Arahata Kanson to help with the newspaper. Meanwhile, Mori met with Kanno and managed to get Kanno to contribute to the Muro Shimpo. Mori was imprisoned on March 13, 1906, and Kanno arrived on February 4 to become the head editor. Kanno and Arahata developed a close friendship due to their similar past with Christianity and socialism. Kanno eventually returned to Kyoto at the end of May 1906, though she still wrote articles for the Muro Shinpō. Eventually, Kanno with her sister Hide, moved to Tokyo, working as a reporter for the Mainichi Denpo (Tokyo Telegraph). Around the same time, Kanno grew concerned about Hide's illness. In February 1907, Hide's health rapidly declined until she died on February 22, 1907, as Kanno and Arahata lacked the money to hospitalize her. In the same year, Kanno contracted tuberculosis, eventually going to a convalescent home in early May for two months. The disease made her more irritable, eventually straining her relationship with Arahata to the point of separation, although their friends still saw them as a couple.

In June 1908, Kanno attended a rally held by Arahata, Sakai, and other socialist-anarchist leaders, which would be known as the Red Flag Incident, where they waved red flags and sang songs. The government tried to suppress the rally which resulted in a fight, with the socialist-anarchists prevailing, but they were still arrested in the end. The leaders of the rally were imprisoned. Kanno went to the police station to inquire about them, where she discovered they had been tortured by the police. Subsequently, the police also arrested her, where she remained imprisoned for two months. The experience changed Kanno's belief about the peaceful socialist methods she had previously endorsed. Instead, she believed violence was necessary to topple the current system. She was also fired from the Muro Shinpō, which led to Kanno taking up domestic work. She also began a relationship with Kōtoku, who was jailed for his writings in the Heimin Shimbun. He left for the US after he was released, returning 6 months later as a firm anarchist. In 1909, he divorced his second wife and lived with Kanno. He believed in equality for women, but still frequently visited brothels. The affair disgusted their comrades, believing Kanno had betrayed the still-imprisoned Arahata. Kanno stopped publishing for almost a year after the autumn of 1908, due to her newfound domestic duties and illness, as she had to recuperate for several weeks in February 1909.

=== The High Treason Incident ===
In 1909, Kanno met Miyashita Daikichi, who claimed he had produced bombs to assassinate the emperor. Miyashita was a factory worker who was convinced by Morochika Umpei, a member of the Heiminsha, that the emperor was not actually divine. Miyashita also read the work of Uchiyama Gudō, who argued that tenant farmers were impoverished due to exploitation by the elites, namely by the emperor and landowners. Uchiyama also elaborated on the "actual" origins of the emperor, who was not divine, but instead a common bandit who lacked real domestic power and was a frequent victim of foreign enemies. Kanno was enthused about the scheme, hoping to emulate Sophia Perovskaya, a participant in the assassination of Tsar Alexander II. Kotoku was also interested in the idea, although he would later distance himself from the conspirators. Uchiyama was arrested in May 1909, which led to increased surveillance on the Heiminsha. Kotoku would publicly decline any allegations of anti-imperial plots, but Kanno and Kotoku were now closely watched.

Miyashita eventually turned the bomb to his friend Shimizu Taichiro, who then betrayed the group to the police. The plot was uncovered in May 1910, while Kanno was still in prison. The government rounded up anybody who had connections with Kotoku, with a total of twenty-six individuals put on trial, Kanno being the only woman present. Twenty-four would be sentenced to death and two were sentenced to prison time, although twelve sentences would be commuted to just imprisonment.

Kanno bluntly confronted the government, refusing to avoid responsibility. She remarked:

"Basically even among anarchists I was among the more radical thinkers. When I was imprisoned in June 1908 in connection with the Red Flag incident I was outraged at the brutal behavior of the police. I concluded that a peaceful propagation of our principles could not be conducted under these circumstances. It was necessary to arouse the people's awareness by staging riots or a revolution or by undertaking assassinations ... I hoped to destroy not only the emperor but other elements too ... Emperor Mutsuhito [Emperor Meiji], compared with other emperors in history, seems to be popular with the people and is a good individual. Although I feel sorry for him personally, he is, as emperor, the chief person responsible for the exploitation of the people economically. Politically he is at the root of all the crimes being committed, and intellectually he is the fundamental cause of superstitious beliefs. A person in such a position, I concluded, must be killed."

Later, when the judge asked Kanno if she wished to make a final statement, she stated her only regret was that the plot failed and she felt that she had failed those who sacrificed their lives for the sake of the people. Before her death, Kanno wrote her memoirs detailing her life and views. On January 25, 1911, Kanno was hanged. The newspaper Miyako Shimbun detailed Kanno's execution:

"She mounted the scaffold escorted by guards on both sides. Her face was covered quickly by a white cloth ... She was then ordered to sit upright on the floor. Two thin cords were placed around her neck. The floor-board was removed. In twelve minutes she was dead."

== Views ==
=== Anarchism ===
Although Kanno was originally a socialist, she later converted to anarchism during her imprisonment after the Red Flag Incident. She criticized the kokutai system, which stated that the Japanese emperor himself was the embodiment of Japan. Kanno argued that the emperor was not a divine figure nor an actual descendant of Amaterasu. Kanno sought to overthrow the Japanese government, targeting politicians, prosecutors, police, etc. During her execution, she expressed her hatred for the prosecutor, Taketomi:

"While I was in prison the, I resolved not to rest until I killed [you] Prosecutor Taketomi, the enemy I'd grown to hate. And when we raised the revolutionary movement, I was determined that the first thing I'd do would be to hurl a bomb at your head. If I hurled a bomb at you, I imagine your life blood would gush with just about as much vigorous as you had when delivering that [court-room] address, wouldn't it? In the months after my release from prison in September last year, 1909, my resolution to kill you did not waver. Also when I was told after my collapse in October when I was feverish and unconscious that I'd raved in my delirium about Prosecutor Taketomi – that I bore that deep a grudge against someone – it was enough to make me laugh. Then someone, I don't remember who, said that Prosecutor Taketomi - was not that brutal personally, and my antipathy subsided a little. Also, because I had much to do for the cause and my own affairs to attend to, until today there has been no opportunity to kill you."

She also specified other pivotal Japanese government figures, including Yamagata Aritomo and Emperor Meiji. For the former, Kanno expressed her "joy" if she was able to throw a bomb at him, due to his hostility to democracy and socialism. In regards to the latter, she did not personally hate him, but saw him as the ultimate symbol of the oppressive government. She stated:

"Though I actually feel it is a pity to do away with the current sovereign in his capacity as an individual, as sovereign of a system that oppresses us he is the one who stands at its apex, and it is therefore unavoidable. It is necessary, that is, because he is the leader of the spoilers. The reason why I think it is a pity is that he merely leaves things up to his government officials, and cannot know anything firsthand about society. I think that if we were able now to speak with him a little in person about democracy, he might come to understand and put a stop to this persecution. But in the situation there is today there is no hope of our having an opportunity to speak to the sovereign. He is a noble and great person, so it is regrettable but truly unavoidable."

=== Socialism ===
During Kanno's time at the Muro Shinpō, she published her views regarding socialism:

"Our ideal is socialism, which aims at the equality of all classes. But just as a great building cannot be destroyed in a moment, the existing hierarchical class system, which has been consolidated over many years, cannot be overthrown in a day and a night ... So we [women] must first of all achieve the fundamanetal principle of 'self-awareness', and develop our potential, uplift our character, and then gradually work toward the realization of our ideal".

She believed that socialism would liberate men from the patriarchy. However, she still argued that while the abolition of capitalism would present an opportunity for true gender equality, women still had to actively fight for equality.

During her imprisonment for the Red Flag incident, Kanno changed her views regarding a peaceful socialist revolution. Instead, she then believed that violence would be necessary to topple the government in order to bring about equality.

=== Feminism ===
Kanno initially had a negative view of prostitution and geisha (believing geisha were also prostitutes), lambasting the system of public prostitution as "a defilement of the dignity of the exposition" and that it "dishonored the nation before the eyes of foreign visitors". She viewed the prostitutes as "fallen women," resembling the views of the Reform Society. However, she would change her view, shifting more of the blame from these "fallen women" to the government itself. Kanno lambasted the official sanctioning of prostitution, disgusted that the Japanese government would allow the sexual exploitation of the daughters of the poor. Furthermore, she also blamed male customers of the various red-light districts.

She was a firm believer in gender equality, arguing in a Muro Shinpō piece:

"In these postwar years there are many tasks facing the nation in politics, economy, industry, education, and so on. But for us women the most urgent task is to develop our own self-awareness. In accordance with long-standing customs, we have seen as a form of material property. Women in Japan are in a state of slavery. Japan has become an advanced, civilized nation, but we women are still denied our freedom by an invisible iron fence. There are women who take pride in their apparel, who are content to eat good food, and who regard going to the theater as the highest form of pleasure. We could ignore for the time being these pitiful women with slavish sentiments and hapless plights, women who give no thought to anything but their own self-interest. But women with some education and some degree of social knowledge must surely be discontented and angry about their status ..."

In addition, she chastised men for constantly harping on the importance of female chastity. Instead, she argued that men should focus more on being "wise husbands and good fathers", than criticizing women for lacking of it. This is a reference to ryōsai kenbo, or "good wife, wise mother," the patriarchal ideal for womanhood in Japan. However, it is not clear if Kanno herself still believed in the importance of female chastity.

Kanno also argued against the focus on female appearance. She called for women to stop focusing on their appearance, dispensing with their obi, kimono sleeves, etc. She believed that the clothing of women, specifically the decorative aspects, exacerbated the symbolism of women as the "playthings and slaves."

She wrote another article detailing her views on men in a piece entitled A Perspective on Men:

"There are no animals in the world as conceited as men. When they are paid even casual compliments by women, they immediately jump to conclusions and betray themselves with loathsome smirks. Men really are the personification of conceit. The more conceited [they] are, moreover, the more they tend to prefer fainthearted people. In times of emergency, they clearly have more affection for women with no self-respect, who first burst into tears, wailing 'Whatever shall we do?' at their wits' end, than for wives who give good counsel....Many men dislike women with their own opinions. They prefer women who listen to what they have to say admiringly, even if they are utterly indifferent. Men who are very conceited treat women as playthings ... They hide behind their masks, looking grave, putting on airs and affecting dignity; and the more they talk self-importantly, feign cleverness, and take themselves too seriously, the more women are able to see through their downright stupidity."

=== Pacifism ===
Kanno, prior to her imprisonment for the Red Flag Incident, was a pacifist. She had joined Christians and socialists in opposing the Russo-Japanese war, publishing the short story Zekko (Severed Relations) in October 1903. The story is centered on two teenage girls arguing about the war. One of the girls, the daughter of a pastor, argues that Japan would become a barbaric nation if it warred with Russia. The story concludes with the other girl, a sister of a Sino-Japanese war hero, denouncing the other girl as a traitor and coward. She goes further in attacking Christianity as a foreign religion, incompatible with the Japanese spirit. While Kanno was a pacifist, she still showed hints of nationalism in Zekko. She believed that women could not meaningfully contribute to the war effort by just the Women's Patriotic Association (Aikoku Fujinkai). She believed that if women wanted to contribute, they would have to actively join the war effort, acting as nurses and workers. She also linked her pseudo-nationalistic arguments with her belief in women's rights, mainly that of self-sacrifice, in urging men to stop visiting prostitutes and instead contribute money to the war effort.

== Historiographical Issues ==
Kanno is often depicted as a promiscuous temptress, an "enchantress" whose sexual affairs spanned the socialist sphere, who used sex to advance her journalistic career, and who "allowed herself to sink into a life of prostitution."

This depiction can be traced directly to her ex-husband Arahata Kanson's autobiography, where he details a seduction by Kanno and a lurid string of her supposed past affairs, the latter of which seem logistically unlikely. Her relationships confirmed by other sources are limited to Komiya Fukutarō, Arahata himself, and Kōtoku Shūsui. The editor of Kanno's collected works comments that Arahata "had a complex and excessive resentment toward Sugako [Kanno] through out his life. He worked very hard to construct her as a promiscuous enchantress and insulted her whenever he could."

Notable works influenced by Arahata's portrayal of Kanno include those by Mikiso Hane, Hélène Bowen Raddeker, and Sharon Sievers—some of the most well-known English sources on Kanno. Though Raddeker is skeptical of Arahata's portrayal, she follows his conflation of Kanno's fictional heroines with Kanno's real life, including his unattested account that Kanno's stepmother convinced a miner from her father's business to rape her as a teenager. Hane and Sievers include this account as well.

Tomoko Seto suggests that negative portrayals of Kanno during her lifetime not only reveal the extent to which sexism persisted among outwardly progressive male socialists, but may have contributed to a general negative image of female activists.

== Legacy ==
Her life inspired the play Kaiki Shoku (Eclipse), produced by the theater company Aono Jikken Ensemble and written by William Satake Blauvelt.

== See also ==
- Japanese dissidence during the Shōwa period
- Socialist thought in Imperial Japan
- Feminism in Japan
- Anarchism in Japan
- Anarcha-Feminism
- Socialist feminism

== Bibliography ==
- Hane, Mikiso (1988). Reflections on the Way to the Gallows: Voices of Japanese Rebel Women. Berkeley: University of California Press. ISBN 0520084217. OCLC 42922571.
- Lunsing, Wim (2002). "Kanno Suga". In Levinson, David; Christensen, Karen (eds.). Encyclopedia of Modern Asia. Vol. 3. New York: Charles Scribner's Sons. p. 309. ISBN 0684806177. OCLC 163245811.
- Mackie, Vera (1997). Creating socialist women in Japan: Gender, Labour, and Activism, 1900–1937. Cambridge: Cambridge University Press. ISBN 0521551374. OCLC 776974182.
- Mae, Michiko (2014). "The nexus of nation, culture and gender in modern Japan: The resistance of Kanno Sugako and Kaneko Fumiko". In Germer, Andrea; Mackie, Vera; Wöhr, Ulrike (eds.). Gender, nation and state in modern Japan. Translated by Stickland, Leonie. London: Routledge. ISBN 9780415381383. OCLC 915552661.
- Ohya, Wataru (1989). 管野スガと石上露子 (in Japanese). Osaka: Toho Shuppan. ISBN 4885912156. OCLC 20853231.
- Raddeker, Hélène (1997). Treacherous Women of Imperial Japan: Patriarchal fictions, Patricidal fantasies. London: Routledge. ISBN 0415171121. OCLC 52624793.
- Seto, Tomoko (2006). Kanno Suga (1881-1911): Life as a Feminist Journalist 1902-08. New York: City University of New York. (Master's thesis.)
- Sievers, Sharon (1983). Flowers in Salt: The Beginnings of Feminist Consciousness in Modern Japan. Stanford: Stanford University Press. ISBN 0804711658. OCLC 1206416898.
