= Shigeki Oka =

- 岡 繁樹
- Born: 1878; Kōchi Prefecture
- Died: 1959 (aged 80–81)
- Occupation: Journalist
- Movement: Socialist

Shigeki Oka (岡 繁樹, Oka Shigeki, 1878–1959) was an issei socialist, printer, and newspaper publisher.

== Biography ==
Oka was born in Kōchi Prefecture, the former feudal domain of Tosa. He was employed at the Yorozu choho (Complete Morning Report), where he became friends with anarchist Kotoku Shusui, Sakai Toshihiko, and Kinoshita Naoe.

In 1902, Oka Shigeki immigrated to America, where he became head of the San Francisco branch of the Heimin-sha (Society of Commoners). He helped Kotoku Shusui make contact with American socialists, and anarchists during his stay in America. Before Kotoku returned to Japan, Oka gave advice to Kotoku on how to start a revolution in Japan.

During World War II, following the signing of Executive Order 9066, Oka was interned at Heart Mountain Internment Camp.

In 1943, he was recruited by the British Armed Forces to print propaganda materials, such as the Gunjin Shimbun [Soldier News], in Kolkata, India.

Naoki Oka is Shigeki Oka's brother.

== See also ==
- Japanese dissidence during the Shōwa period
