= Socialism in the Empire of Japan =

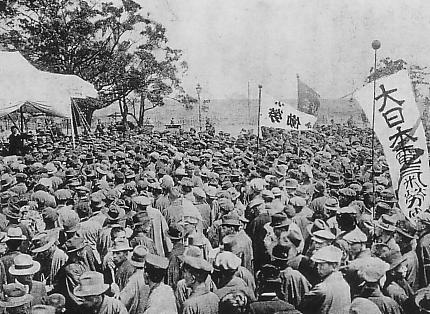
First Labor Day Rally in Japan, 1920

Socialist thought in Imperial Japan appeared during the Meiji period (1868–1912) with the development of numerous relatively short-lived political parties through the early Shōwa period. Left-wing parties, whether advocating communism or socialism, provoked hostility from the mainstream political parties, oligarchs and military alike, and many were either banned or went underground soon after formation. Although occasionally winning a seat in the lower house of the Diet of Japan, left-socialist parties played little role in the government of the Empire of Japan.

== Early development of leftist politics ==
The ideology of socialism was introduced to Japan in the early Meiji period, largely via Christian missionaries with their concepts of universal fraternity, but had little attraction until the increased industrialization of Japan had created a disaffected urban labor force which became more receptive to calls for a more equitable distribution of wealth, increased public services and at least some nationalization of the means of production.

The early Freedom and People's Rights Movement founded in 1873 is also regarded as a forerunner to Japanese socialist development for its attraction to the labor movement and agrarian movement and increased representative democracy; However, it was more concerned with Constitutional development than social consciousness.

The Meirokusha think tank, also founded in 1873 is also regarded as a forerunner to Japanese socialist development, due to the support of many of its members for social change. However, the political outlook of most of its members was more liberal than socialist.

== Social democracy and democratic socialism in the Empire of Japan ==
Moderates who favoured mild reforms followed thinkers like Sakuzō Yoshino, who was a professor at Tokyo Imperial University. He felt that the Emperor system and other elements of Japan's traditional kokutai were compatible with democracy and socialism.

Yoshino went on to found his own political party with a mix of Christian socialism, Confucian public morality, and syndicalism. Along with Tokuzō Fukuda of Keio University, Yoshino joined with others to establish Reimeikai, which was a society "to propagate ideas of democracy among the people." This group was formed in order to sponsor public lectures. The movement initially attracted many students and worker leaders. The party collapsed in 1920.

== Socialism in the Empire of Japan ==
The Society for the Study of Socialism (社会主義研究会, Shakai Shugi Kenkyukai) was founded in October 1896, members included Isoo Abe, Kōtoku Shūsui and Sen Katayama. It was reorganized in 1901 into Japan’s first socialist political party, the Social Democratic Party (社会民主党, Shakai Minshu-tō). The government outlawed the new party two days after its formation.

The Japan Socialist Party (日本社会党, Nihon Shakai-tō) was founded on 28 January 1906 as a coalition representing a wide spectrum of socialist beliefs. The radical element was led by Kōtoku Shūsui, an anarcho-syndicalist, who favored direct action and strikes, while the moderates were led by Sen Katayama and Tatsuji Tazoe, who favoured a mild program of social reform. This coalition was unstable, and collapsed after only a year, on 22 February 1907. The various factions went on to create small, short-lived political parties, many of which came under police scrutiny and were suppressed under the increasingly restrictive Peace Preservation Laws. The execution of Kotoku Shusui in the aftermath of the High Treason Incident in 1911 was also a severe blow to the early socialist movement. The next few years were known as "the winter years" of socialism in Japan as political activity was next to none.

Other early socialist parties included:

- Japan Labour-Farmer Party (日本労農党, Nihon Rōnōtō) (1926–1928)
- Labour-Farmer Party (労働農民党, Rōdōnōmintō) (1926–1928)
- Social Democratic Party (社会民主党, Shakai Minshutō) (1926–1932)
- Japan Federation of Labour (総同盟, Nihon Rōdō Sōdōmei) (1919–1940)
- Socialist Masses Party (社会大衆党, Shakai Taishutō) (1932–1940)
- Japan Proletarian Party (日本無産党, Nihon Musantō) (1937)

== Communism in the Empire of Japan ==
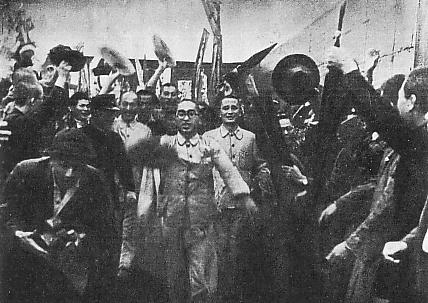
Release of Communist Party Members from prison, 1945

The Japanese Communist Party (日本共産党, Nippon Kyōsantō) (JCP) was founded on 15 July 1922, as an underground branch of Comintern by a group of socialist activists, including Hitoshi Yamakawa, Kanson Arahata, Toshihiko Sakai, Kyuichi Tokuda and Sanzō Nosaka. Outlawed at once under the Peace Preservation Law, the JCP was subjected to repression and persecution by the military and police.

The party was dominated by Hitoshi Yamakawa in its early years, but Yamakawa had the party formally dissolved in 1924, stating that the time was not right for a communist party in Japan. Also in 1924, Kazuo Fukumoto returned to Japan after studying Marxism in Germany and France, and scathingly attacked Yamakawa's approach, citing a need for the formation of a vanguard party on the Leninist model. He presided over the re-establishment of the JCP in 1926. The difference between Yamakawa and Fukumoto was both theoretical and practical, as Yamakawa wanted to avoid discussing the Emperor system and whether it represented feudalism (as the Comintern and Fukumoto thought) or if it was no different from the English monarchy as Yamakawa maintained.

On 15 July 1927, the Comintern issued a thesis attacking both Yamakawa and Fukumoto and demanding that the party strive for an immediate two-stage revolution to overthrow the Japanese government, and especially the Emperor system and Diet of Japan, redistribution of wealth and favorable policy with the Soviet Union.

In the March 15 Incident of 1928 and April 16 Incident of 1929, thousands of suspected communists were arrested nationwide. In a special open trial of the Tokyo District Court in 108 sessions from 25 June 1931 to 2 July 1932, some 300 members of the JCP were sentenced. The trial was carefully orchestrated by the Home Ministry to expose the inner workings of the JCP and its strategy to undermine the existing political order. All defendants were found guilty and were given stiff sentences, but those who publicly recanted (tenkō) their communist ideology and who agreed to rehabilitation were given much reduced sentences.

In 1931, the underground JCP issued a new thesis calling for an immediate socialist revolution. This radical approach led to a fracturing of the JCP leadership, attacks from social democrats, and more repression from the government. Overseas aid from Comintern not being forthcoming (the JCP was suspected of being infected with Trotskyism by its Soviet counterparts), the Japanese communist movement virtually ceased to exist after 1935 with the arrest of its leadership and dissolution of supporting organizations. It would not be reestablished until after the war.
