= Ishikawa Sanshirō =

Japanese Christian anarchist

Sanshirō Ishikawa
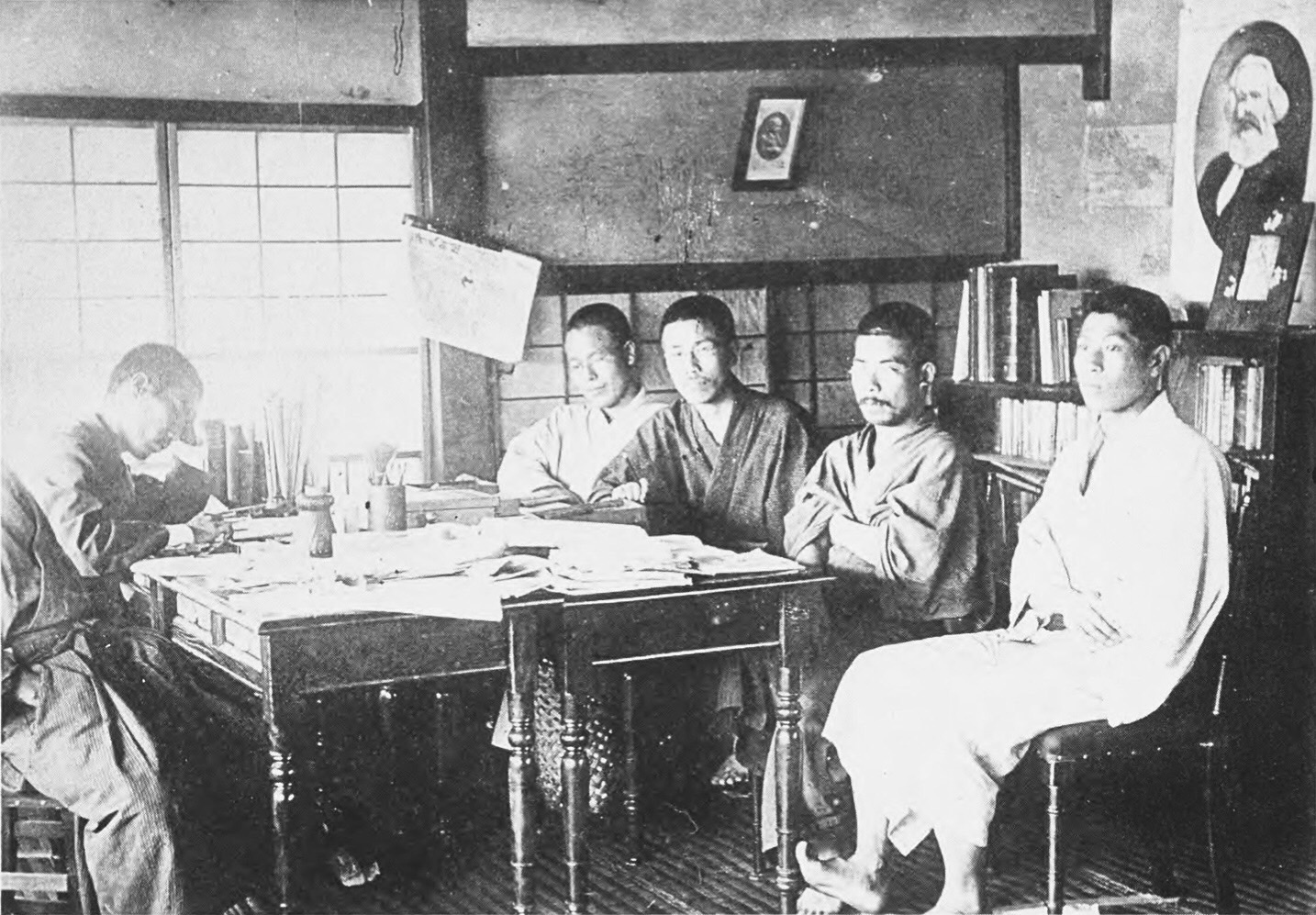
- Sanshirō pictured third from right
- Born: May 23, 1876
- Died: November 28, 1956 (aged 80)

Sanshirō Ishikawa (石川三四郎; 1876–1956) was a Japanese Christian, socialist, and anarcho-syndicalist who was influential in the Japanese anarchist movement during the 20th century. He wrote under the pen-name Asahiyama and was a contributor of first Japanese socialist women's newspaper, Sekai Fujin.

== Political career ==
=== Involvement with Heimin Shinbun ===
Graduating from what is now Chuo University in 1902, he joined the Yorozu Chūhō newspaper. After the paper endorsed the idea of war with Russia in 1903, he resigned alongside Kōtoku Shūsui to form the anti-war socialist Heimin-sha group and its associated newspaper, the Heimin Shinbun. He contributed to the newspaper regularly, and the editor, Kōtoku, was sentenced to five months in prison for editorial responsibility in publishing Ishikawa's Appeal to Elementary School Teachers, an appeal against nationalism published in November 1904.

In November 1905, after the end of the Russo-Japanese War, the Heimin-sha dissolved itself. In its wake, the socialist movement fractured into Christian and materialist factions. The former, led by figures including Ishikawa, Abe Isoo, and Kinoshita Naoe, formed the Shinkigen-sha group and its associated newspaper, Shinkigen. Materialists, including Kōtoku, created the Bonjinsha group and readily attacked Christianity. The divided anarchist movement reunited once more when Ishikawa agreed, after much persuasion, to support the publication of a new Heimin Shinbun newspaper in 1907, alongside Kōtoku. However, the newspaper would only last for three months, from January to April.

The rift within the socialist movement between Christians and materialists was promptly replaced with a divide between advocates of a parliamentary approach and advocates of direct action. Ishikawa believed that engaging in constitutional politics was useless, and refused to participate in the Japan Socialist Party. He was imprisoned from 1907 to 1908 for publishing pro-direct action speeches made by Kōtoku Shūsui in the Heimin Shinbun, and was jailed once more in 1910.

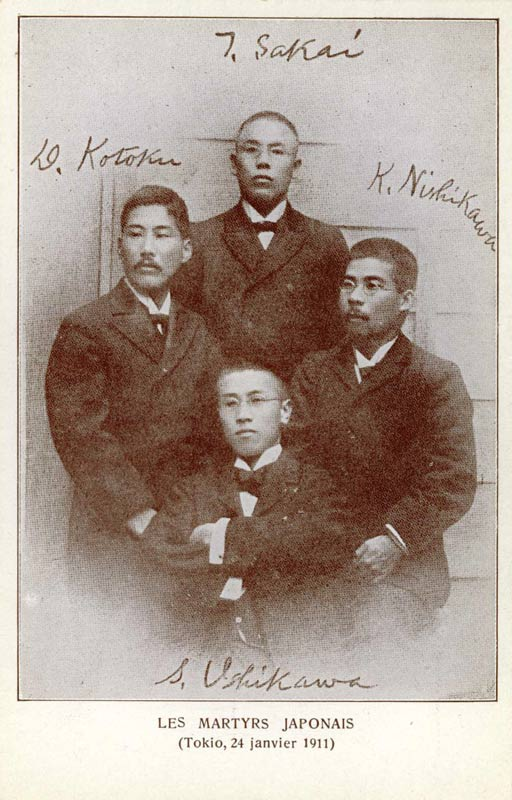
"Les martyrs japonais" (1911) (French postcard with the pictures of Denjirō Kōtoku, Toshihiko Sakai, Sanshirō Ishikawa and Kōjiro Nishikawa.

=== After the High Treason Incident ===
Due to his imprisonment, he evaded the persecution of the High Treason Incident which devastated the anarchist movement. Nevertheless, he opted to move to Europe in 1913, not returning to Japan until 1920. While in Europe, he stayed mostly with the Reclus family in Brussels, where he learned about syndicalist methods from French unions. Like the Russian anarchist Peter Kropotkin, he signed the Manifesto of the Sixteen endorsing the Allies of World War I.

In 1926, Ishikawa helped to found Zenkoku Jiren, a federation of syndicalist unions. However, a widening dispute emerged between advocates of 'pure' anarchism (anarcho-communism) and supporters of anarcho-syndicalism, and the federation moved away from Ishikawa's ideas towards 'pure' anarchism. In response, syndicalist unions withdrew from the federation, and eventually formed a rival anarcho-syndicalist union, the Jikyo. As Japan became more militaristic, though, anarchism was repressed using harsher methods, and anarchist organisations essentially collapsed until the end of the Second World War.

=== After WW2 ===
After the war, Ishikawa wrote Japan 50 Years Later, envisioning Japanese society after an anarchist revolution. In this work, he advocated a mutualist economy on a co-operative basis. He also supported nudism as an expression of freedom, and - unlike his contemporary anarchists - the maintenance of the Japanese Emperor as a symbol of communal affection. Ishikawa was involved in the founding of a new Japanese Anarchist Federation in 1946, which was subject to similar divisions and splits as before the war. He died in 1956.
