= Kinoshita Naoe =

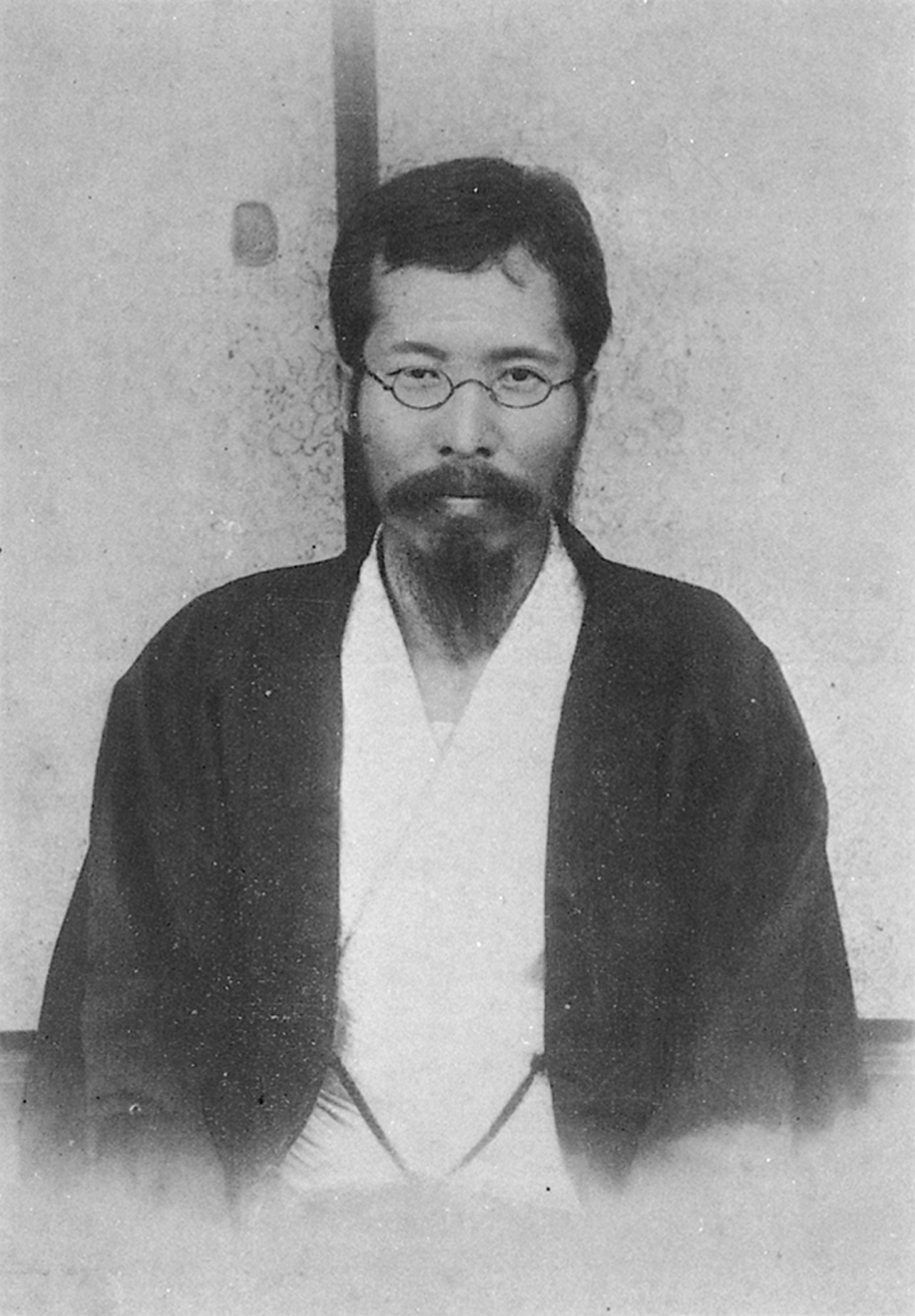
- Born: 12 October 1869; Matsumoto, Nagano, Japan
- Died: 5 November 1937 (aged 68)
- Education: Waseda University
- Occupations: Christian socialist activist Author
- Writing career
- Language: Japanese

Kinoshita Naoe (木下 尚江, Kinoshita Naoe; 12 October 1869 – 5 November 1937) was a Japanese Christian socialist activist and author.

== Biography ==
Kinoshita was a native of Matsumoto, Nagano. After graduating from the predecessor of Waseda University, he returned to Nagano to work as a journalist and lawyer. He later converted to Christianity. Due to his support of the women's rights movement and advocacy of social issues (particularly the Ashio Copper Mine Incident), he was jailed.

In 1901, Kinoshita joined Abe Isoo, Katayama Sen, Kōtoku Shūsui, and Kawakami Kiyoshi in founding the Shakai Minshūtō (Social Democratic Party). The new political party was quickly banned by the authorities. From 1903, he was an editor of the Heimin Shimbun, a leftist newspaper co-founded by Kōtoku.

In 1904, Kinoshita wrote articles critical of the Russo-Japanese War, and in 1905 unsuccessful ran for election. After the Heimin Shimbun was suppressed by the government, he began to write for the Shin Kigen Christian-socialist magazine. He wrote regularly for Fukuda Hideko's socialist women's magazine Sekai Fujin from 1907 to 1909. His anti-war novel, Pillar of Fire was banned by the government in 1910. He continued to write pacifist and socialist themed novels for the remainder of his career and in his final years was attracted by attempts to form a union of Christianity with Buddhism.

Kinoshita was also instrumental in abolishing licensed prostitution in Japan.

== Works ==
=== Novels ===
- Pillar of Fire (火の柱, Hi no Hashira) (1904–1906), translated into English by Kenneth Strong ISBN 978-0048230973
- The Confession of a Husband (良人の自白, Ryōjin no Jihaku) (1904)
- Soul or Flesh? (霊か肉か, Rei ka Niku ka) (1907–1908)
- The Beggar (乞食, Kojiki) (1908)
- Graveyard (墓場, Hakaba) (1908)
- Labor (労働, Rōdō) (1909)
- House (家宅, Kataku) (1910)

=== Other ===
- Repentance (懺悔, Zange) (1906)
- O Sacred Love (嗚呼聖なる恋よ, Aa Sei naru Koi yo) (1907)
- For Whose Sake is Art? (誰が爲の芸術, Dare ka Tame no Geijutsu) (1907)
- The Blind Woman (盲女, Mōjo) (1907)
- The Miso Strainer (味噌こし笊, Misokoshi Zaru) (1907)
- Vagabond Dog (宿無し犬, Yadonashi Inu) (1907)
- Starvation (飢渇, Kikatsu) (1907)
- Nakayama Mikiko (中山みき子) (1908)
- Wilderness (荒野, Arano) (1909)
- On Nichiren (日蓮論, Nichiren ron) (1910)
- Houzen to Shinran (法然と親鸞) (1911)
- Rural Language (野人語, Yajin go) (1911)
- Creation (創造, Sōzō) (1912)
- Mr. Tanaka Shōzō (田中正造翁, Tanaka Shōzō ō) (1921)
- God, Humanity, Freedom (神・人間・自由, Kami・Ningen・Jiyuu) (1934)

== See also ==
- Shinkigen
