= Fukuda Hideko =

Japanese feminist activist (1865–1927)

- 福田 英子
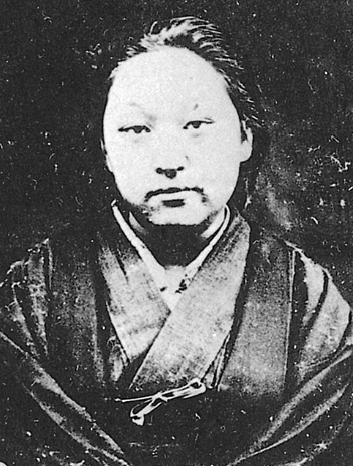
- Born: October 5, 1865
- Died: May 2, 1927 (aged 61)
- Occupation(s): Japanese author and reformist

Fukuda Hideko (Japanese: 福田 英子; October 5, 1865 – May 2, 1927), born Kageyama Hideko (景山 英子), was a Japanese feminist activist. She was educated at a young age and pursued socialist and feminist goals for most of her adult life. She was a participant in the Osaka Incident of 1885, where approximately 130 liberal activists were arrested on their way to attempt to incite revolution and liberate Korea. The group had planned to provide guns, bombs, and manpower to support reformist movements in Korea before the police intercepted them. After being freed, Fukuda continued to pursue social and gender reforms in Japan, playing an active role in the Freedom and People's Rights Movement which pushed for democratic changes to the government. She eventually established the magazine Sekai Fujin (Women of the World), which aimed at empowering women in Japan and getting them involved in international affairs. Throughout her life, Fukuda was involved in Japanese reform movements as they transitioned from aiming on increasing citizen's political rights to the more socialist-focused waves which attempted to exact nationwide social and economic revisions.

== Early life ==
Fukuda Hideko, born Kageyama Hideko, was the child of samurai Kageyama Katashi and his wife Umeko. Her mother was a teacher and often brought Fukuda along with her to school. Like some other prominent women in the reform movement, Fukuda's family found her resistant to conforming to "proper" feminine behavior. Fukuda even described herself as a tomboy during her childhood. By fifteen, the bright Fukuda was exposed to Japanese, Chinese, and Western thought. Fukuda first began her political activities after encouragement from her friend and future fiancé Kobayashi Kusuo. It was Kobayashi who loaned her a translated biography of Joan of Arc, who Fukuda then aspired to emulate. In 1882 she was inspired by a speech from Toshiko Kishida, a prominent women's right activist at the time, to join the Freedom and People's Rights Movement. The People's Rights Movement was a group quickly garnering support that pushed for democracy and more egalitarian laws in the country. One year later, Fukuda and her mother founded an all-girls private school, at which they both taught. The school was founded on the ideals of the popular rights movement, and aimed at teaching children of working mothers. However, the school was shut down in 1884 on order of the government, which was worried about the spreading popularity of the People's Rights Movement and the growing political ambitions of women. Angry and wishing to provide more significant support, Fukuda moved to Tokyo.

== The Osaka Incident ==
=== Incident ===
Soon after arriving in Tokyo she met Oi Kentaro, the leader of a radical wing of the Liberal Party. The group was an offshoot of the Freedom and People's Rights Movement that was sweeping across the nation. Fukuda joined the group in attempting to transport weapons and money to Korea. Their goal was to create a disturbance large enough to undo the Sino-Japanese accord signed in 1885. Both Fukuda and Kentaro were angered at the government's perceived lack of action in Korea. They hoped that inciting reform movements there would either push the Japanese government into following suit or initiate a war, giving the liberals an opportunity to make domestic reforms. Fukuda helped raise funds for the Korean Revolutionary Movement, but she was frustrated by the lack of discipline and habit of many of the male members to go visit brothels, which delayed the group's acquisition of supplies. However, eventually they succeeded in raising enough money and gathering weaponry, including guns and bombs. The party then traveled to Nagasaki on November 20, 1885, from where they planned to depart for Korea. However, the police had already been investigating the large number of robberies in the Osaka area caused by the group, and before the party could travel to Seoul, on November 23, 1885, the roughly 130 members were arrested and charged with the illegal possession of weapons and encouraging riots. Fukuda, the only female included in the trial, was given a sentence of eighteen months, but was released after ten months.

=== Aftermath ===
Although Fukuda wrote that she regretted her involvement in the incident, her trial was widely publicized and served to bring her national attention. The media popularized her as "Japan's Joan of Arc", and she was met with enthusiasm after her release. Afterwards, she and Oi Kentaro became involved in a relationship that produced one son. The partnership was short-lived, and within a year Oi had left her for another woman. Fukuda's family came to Tokyo to support her, and together they opened a women's vocational school. Shortly afterwards, however, her father, aunt, and brother died and Fukuda was unable to maintain running the school. In 1892 Fukuda married Fukuda Yusaku, another liberal intellectual, with whom she had three sons. Yusaku had studied in America and was influenced by the labor movement there. He became ill and died in 1900, leaving Fukuda the single mother to four children.

== Heiminsha ==
Fukuda went on to establish a women's technological school one year later, relying on philanthropist support to teach impoverished women trade skills. Here she met Ishikawa Sanshiro, a reformist collaborator and eventual lover. She was introduced to socialism via her neighbor, Sakai Toshihiko. This was at the same time as Japan's first socialist party-the Social Democratic party- was being created. Sakai was anti-war and promoted equal rights between men and women. In 1903 he and a group of collaborators called the Heiminsha started the Heimin Shimbun, a newspaper dedicated to spreading the socialist message. The paper, focusing on both domestic and foreign affairs, attracted worldwide attention and achieved wide circulation. Fukuda often socialized with members of the Heiminsha and attended their meetings. It was around this time that she published her autobiography Half my Life, which proved to be highly successful. Half my Life was the first autobiography written by a woman in Japan, and included references to the works of Benjamin Franklin, Joan of Arc, and Russian nihilists, among others. With the introduction of socialist thought, Fukuda's views on reform began to solidify. She disagreed with Japan's imperialist policies and the excesses of the upper class, but also found issue with the Liberal Party's "insincerity" and disreputable behavior, which had led her to break off with the group responsible for the Osaka incident. The government eventually suppressed the Heimin Shimbun in 1905 due to the articles protesting the Russo-Japanese War.

== Later life and Sekai Fujin ==
=== Sekai Fujin ===
On January 1, 1907, the first issue of Sekai Fujin (Women of the World) was published. It was the first Japanese socialist women's newspaper. Established by Fukuda, who was also its chief editor, and Ishikawa Sanshiro, the newspaper focused on women and reform interests. Fukuda declared the intention of the newspaper to be to “find women’s talent and vocation and to inspire women to join a reform movement based on their natural talent." While it included articles about domestic women's interest, such as sewing or poetry, Sekai Fujin had an international emphasis and attempted to bring global ideas to women in Japan. Aside from extended discussion of socialist figures such as Karl Marx and Peter Kropotkin, Sekai Fujin also published translations of foreign fiction, such as Maxim Gorky's Chelkash (as Wandering (放浪, Hourou) ) and Guy de Maupassant's Le Diable (as Devil (魔, Ma) ). Fukuda hoped the newspaper would advance the cause of women's emancipation. Two major campaigns supported by the newspaper were the repeal of a law banning women from being a part of political meetings and the Yanaka Village Relief Campaign. The law, Article Five of the Police Security Regulations, specifically forbade women from joining political parties or taking a public role in policy or debates. Fukuda organized petitions to the Senate and helped the bill reach the House of Representatives, where it passed, but it repeatedly failed in the House of Peers.

=== Yanaka Village ===
Yanaka village was a small town near Tokyo that was the proposed site of a reservoir for the Watarase River. When some families refused to leave their homes, government officials began a series of attempts to force them off the land. Sekai Fujin backed the efforts of local villagers who refused to move out. Fukuda and her supporters provided funds and aid after the government officials destroyed the villagers houses and left the dike protecting the village from flood unrepaired. Following the end of the post-war economic boom, the government began to go after socialist groups with increased vigor. The Heimin Shimbun was shut down, labor revolts were violently repressed, the socialist party was banned, and Sakai Toshihiko was imprisoned. The government began a process of heavy suppression against Sekai Fujin, usually through heavy fines and censorship. The newspaper was eventually banned from discussing current events, and co-founder Ishikawa Sanshiro was arrested. This eventually forced Sekai Fujin to close down in 1909.

=== Seito article ===
Fukuda's last years were spent in poverty and hardship. Ishikawa moved to Belgium and shortly afterwards Fukuda contracted beriberi. Nevertheless, she continued writing and had her article "The Solution to the Woman Question" printed in Seito, a popular women's rights magazine. Inclusion of Fukuda's article caused the entire issue to be banned. The government was especially sensitive to Fukuda's article because it not only focused on women, but brought in issues of class. Fukuda saw the difficulties faced by women as intrinsically tied to the exploitative capitalist system in place, and yearned for a return to an agrarian-modeled society. The article also spurred intense debate within the Seito group, composed primarily of educated young women. Fukuda moved beyond the goals of many other prominent feminists by discussing the plight of the labor class and impoverished in Japan. Fukuda saw the issue of gender inequality as intrinsically tied in with class inequality, saying "along with the liberation of women, the liberation of men, too, must be accomplished." Fukuda's article pushed for an encompassing discussion of equality as a societal issue over the more personal approach taken by other leading feminists of the day. She was one of the pioneers of reform movements in Japan, and pursued reforms in the Meiji period longer than any other woman.

=== Death ===
Fukuda died on May 2, 1927, aged 61. While her role in helping trail blaze the feminist movement in Japan was not fully acknowledged until after her death, a group of activists celebrated her achievements 100 years after her birth by erecting a memorial in her honor in Okayama. The memorial includes a quotation from her autobiography: “My life has been one adversity upon another. But I always fought back. Not once, not even once, did I flinch from adversity.”

== See also ==
- Socialist thought in Imperial Japan
- Feminism in Japan
- Japanese literature
- List of Japanese authors
