= Fukao =

Fukao (written: 深尾) is a Japanese surname. Notable people with the surname include:

- Shō Fukao (深尾 韶, 1880–1963), Japanese socialist and educator
- Taeko Fukao (深尾 多恵子), Japanese jazz singer
- Yoshihide Fukao (深尾 吉英, born 1949), Japanese retired volleyball player
