= Motojirō =

- Gender: Male

Origin
- Origin: Japanese
- Meaning: Different meanings depending on the kanji used

Motojirō, Motojiro or Motojirou (written: 基次郎, 元次郎 or 元二郎) is a masculine Japanese given name. Notable people with the name include:

- Akashi Motojiro (明石 元二郎; 1864–1919), Japanese general
- Motojirō Kajii (梶井 基次郎; 1901–1932), Japanese writer
- Motojirō Ozaki (尾崎 元次郎; 1870–1945), Japanese politician and businessman
