= Social Democratic Party (Japan, 1901) =

First socialist party in the Empire of Japan

Social Democratic Party 社会民主党
- Japanese name: Shakaiminshu-tō
- Founded: May 18, 1901
- Dissolved: May 20, 1901
- Headquarters: Tokyo, Japan
- Ideology: Socialism
- Political position: Left-wing

Social Democratic Party (社会(しゃかい)民主党(みんしゅとう), Shakaiminshu-tō) was a political party in Japan that existed for one day before being banned by the government. It was the first socialist party formed in Japan.

The party was founded by Kinoshita Naoe, Kiyoshi Kawakami, Kōnirō Nishikawa, Sen Katayama, Abe Isoo, and Kōtoku Shūsui. Kinoshita and Katayama were nominated as administrative secretaries. When composing the platform, the founders took the platform of Social Democratic Party of Germany (SPD) as the reference. It followed an internationalist spirit in its Basic Program, like its German counterpart. The first article of the platform of the social democratic party was "the aim of our party is to achieve socialism (in Japan)". Five of the six men who founded the party were Christian.

== See also ==
- Japan Socialist Party (1906)
- Social Democratic Party (Japan)
- Social Mass Party

== Works cited ==
- Scalapino, Robert (1967). The Japanese Communist Movement, 1920-1966. University of California Press.
