= Shō Fukao =

Japanese socialist and educator

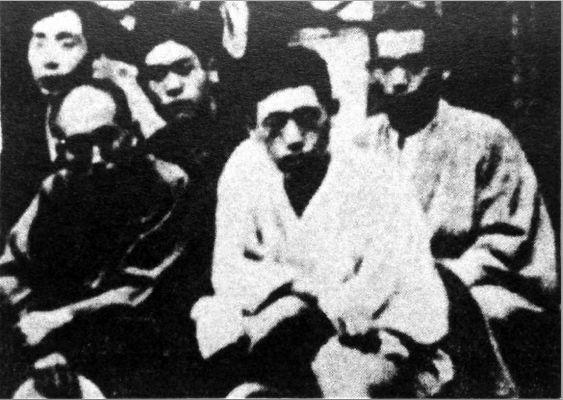
Back row, from left: Shō Fukao, Kanson Arahata, Masatarō Watanabe, at a welcome party for Keir Hardie

Shō Fukao (深尾 韶 Fukao Shō, 12 November 1880 – 8 November 1963) was a Japanese socialist and educator. He was a pioneer in Japanese socialism and in the early Boy Scout movement in Japan.

== Life and career ==
=== Early life ===
Fukao was born on the estate of a hatamoto samurai within Sunpu Castle (in the modern city of Shizuoka) on 12 November 1880. His father Nobushirō (Note: 深尾 信四郎 Fukao Nobushirō) was a retainer in Sunpu Domain who worked as a tax collector and teacher. After graduating from elementary school, his father encouraged Fukao to go to a normal school, but he declined as he disliked the duties and obligations. As a youth he often submitted articles to arts magazines. He worked at the Shizuoka prison and Numazu local court before becoming a substitute teacher at Sodeshi Jinjō Elementary School in 1897. He was issued a teacher's assistant's licence in 1898 and thereafter worked for seven schools in Shizuoka and the northern island-prefecture Hokkaido.

=== Socialism ===
In 1901, Fukao took part in the inauguration of the Shizuoka branch of the social reform group Risōdan (Note: 理想団 Risōdan) ("Band of Idealists").

Beginning in his time as a teacher, Fukao contributed to the weekly libertarian-socialist newspaper Heimin Shimbun. He aimed at establishing an elementary teachers' labour union in Hokkaido, but his parents demanded his return to Shizuoka in July 1904 after the outbreak of the Russo-Japanese War.

In 1905, Fukao and fellow Shizuokans Masatarō Watanabe (1873–1918) and Harako Motoi (1880–1933) devised the Dendō Gyōshō (Note: 伝道行商 Dendō Gyōshō) to proselytize socialism. They had planned to set out from Tokyo that April to travel around Hokkaido, but Watanabe withdrew, and on the advice of Kanson Arahata changed their destination to the closer Kōfu area. The left the offices of Heiminsha, the publishers of Heimin Shimbun, on 10 April. On 13 April they were investigated by the local police, who took their promotional material into custody, so the pair returned to the Heiminsha offices the next day. That May they began doing land clearing work in Hokkaido as the Heimin Nōjō (Note: 平民農場 Heimin Nōjō) ("Commoners' Farm"). Administrating the farm was exceedingly difficult; in August Fukao left it to Harako to manage and went back to Tokyo, never to return. He joined the Yūbunsha, (Note: 由分社 Yūbunsha) an organization made up of former members of Heiminsha after its dissolution, and took part in editing the magazine Katei Zasshi. (Note: 家庭雑誌 Katei Zasshi)

=== Scouting ===
While undergoing medical treatment in the spring of 1909 Fukao obtained Boy Scouts founder Baden-Powell's handbook Scouting for Boys, which he had learned about from an English-language newspaper. He began researching the Scouting movement with his uncle, the editor of Shōnen Jihō, (Note: 少年時報 Shōnen Jihō, "Boys' Newsletter") the results of which appeared in Shōnen Jihō that year with a call for the foundation of a "Boys' Army Corps". (Note: 少年軍団 Shōnen Gundan) They began to put such a corps together in 1910 in cooperation with Colonel Yoshinori Shirakawa, who was the Infantry Regiment Commander of Shizuoka, but the plans were scuttled soon after when Shirakawa was transferred. Fukao went to Tokyo in 1910 and took the position of secretary for Shidōkai, and on the stipend he received lobbied to establish a Boy Scouts movement. In 1912 he visited Nogi Maresuke at the Gakushūin to stress the importance of the Boy Scouts movement, and thereafter made repeated visits to Nogi. He also visited military authorities such as Tanaka Giichi and educators such as Yoshiharu Tadokoro to gain cooperation in the establishment of a boys' army corps. In 1913 he hosted meetings such as one for elementary school principals in Shiba Ward about the establishment of a boys' army corps, but as some questioned Fukao's personal history, the plans failed to reach fruition.

From 1914 to 1916 Fukao worked as a reporter for the Shizuoka Shinpō newspaper. During this time, he gained the friendship of Yoshinori Futara, the head of school affairs for Shizuoka Prefecture. Futara introduced Fukao to Motojirō Ozaki, a member of the Diet. The Shizuoka Shōnen Gundan (Note: 静岡少年軍団 Shizuoka Shōnen Gundan, "Shizuoka Boys' Army Corps") ("Shizuoka Boys' Army Corps") was formed in June 1913 with Ozaki as leader and Fukao and Keijirō Takasugi (Note: 高杉啓次郎 Takasugi Keijirō) as directors. 111 members took part in the enrollment ceremony at Sengen Shrine. Takasugi wanted Fukao removed for his previous activity as a socialist, but Ozaki supported Fukao.

Fukao moved in 1916 to Okitsu (now part of Shimizu Ward in Shizuoka), and the Shizuoka Shōnen Gundan had to dissolve. He returned to Shizuoka in 1918 as a reporter for the Yorozuchōhō newspaper and formed the Shizuoka Shōnendan (Note: 静岡少年団 Shizuoka Shōnendan, "Shizuoka Boy Scouts") ("Shizuoka Boy Scouts") with Ozaki and Reiichi Okamoto. (Note: 岡本礼一 Okamoto Reiichi)

The Scout Association of Japan recognized Fukao for his contributions at an annual general meeting on 20 June 1953 and awarded him the Golden Eagle Award for merit in 1957.

== List of works ==
- 1905 Shakai-shugi no Hanashi 『社会主義の話』 (prohibited the same day)
- 1907 Shafu Shokun ni Mōsu 『車夫諸君に申す』 (prohibited)
- 1915 Shōnen Gundan Kyōhon 『少年軍団教範』 Chūō Hōtokukai
- 1925 Sukauto Dokuhon 『スカウト読本』 Shōnendan Nihon Renmei
