= Japanese Anarchist Federation =

The Japanese Anarchist Federation (日本アナキスト連盟, Nihon Anakisuto Renmei) was an anarchist organisation that existed in Japan from 1946 to 1968.

Formed in May 1946, shortly following the Second World War, the JAF was plagued by disputes between anarcho-communists and anarcho-syndicalists. These divisions culminated in its dissolution in October 1950. By 1956, anarcho-syndicalists reconstituted the Anarchist Federation, while anarcho-communists formed their own Japan Anarchist Club.

The JAF was involved in direct action in numerous forms, including anti-war agitation against the Korean War and Vietnam War, and protests against the 1960 Japan-US Security Treaty and the 1965 Japan-South Korea Treaty.

While anarchism gained support within the Zengakuren and Zenkyoto student groups during the 1960s, the Japanese Anarchist Federation remained a small organisation with little direct influence, and resolved to dissolve itself in 1968.

Another group calling itself the Anarchist Federation formed in October 1988.

== Context ==
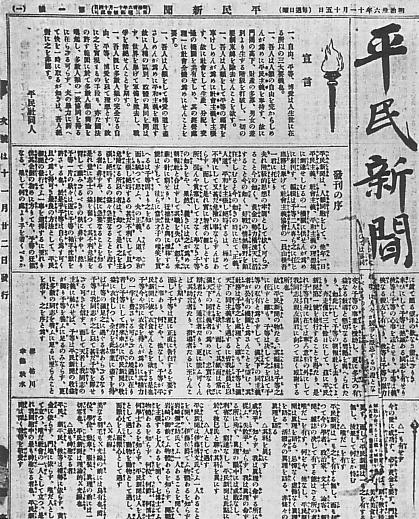
A clip from the socialist Heimin Shinbun newspaper (13 November 1904)

Anarchism in Japan has a long history, arguably having roots in the egalitarian structure of some communal villages during the Tokugawa era. Its modern form, however, originated in the political activities of Kōtoku Shūsui, an anarchist who edited the libertarian-socialist newspaper Heimin Shinbun in the early 20th century. He gained the permission of anarcho-communist writer Peter Kropotkin to translate his works into Japanese, which helped to steer the nascent anarchist movement in a communist direction.

Others in the anarchist movement gravitated towards anarcho-syndicalism. Amongst these was Sanshirō Ishikawa, who had learned syndicalist organising methods from French unions while in Europe. In contrast, advocates of anarcho-communism such as Sakutarō Iwasa were strongly focused on the principles of communal solidarity and mutual aid espoused by Kropotkin. Their focus, and rejection of ideas they perceived to be antithetical to anarchism, led to anarcho-syndicalists giving their ideology the label of 'pure anarchism'. 'Pure anarchists' sharply criticised syndicalist methods and argued that - even if unions seized power, the fundamentally exploitative nature of capitalism would remain, as they argued had happened in the Soviet Union.

In 1928, there was a split in the anarchist movement between these two factions, cementing their divide. As the Japanese state became more militaristic, repression of political movements such as anarchism intensified, particularly after the Manchurian Incident in 1931, and organised anarchist activism essentially became impossible until the end of the Second World War in 1945.

== History ==
=== Founding and split ===
Following the war, and the subsequent occupation of Japan by American forces, anarchists coalesced into a new Japanese Anarchist Federation in May 1946. Both anarcho-communists and anarcho-syndicalists joined, conscious of trying to mend their pre-war division. Many of the leading figures were the same as before the war, with both Sanshirō Ishikawa and Sakutarō Iwasa participating. Iwasa was elected chairman of the National Committee of the Federation, a chiefly organisational role. In June 1946, they began to publish a journal, named Heimin Shinbun after Kōtoku Shūsui's magazine.

The organisation nonetheless failed to gain much support from the general public, due to a number of factors. Anarchists were discriminated against due to a policy of anti-communism pursued by the American-led Allied occupation force, and anarchists also faced opposition from the Japanese Communist Party and its strong trade union presence. Land reform instituted after the war also effectively eliminated the class of tenant farmers that had formed the core base of the pre-war anarchist movement. The anarchists within the JAF were also divided over their political strategy, quarrelling amongst themselves frequently. Idealism, rather than the practical considerations of the populace, became the focus of Heimin Shinbun, and this hindered their capacity to muster public support.

Tensions between the 'pure' and syndicalist anarchists resurfaced due to their lack of success. In May 1950, a splitting organisation, the 'Anarcho-Syndicalist Group' (Anaruko Sanjikarisuto Gurūpu) formed. By October 1950, the organisation had firmly split, and was dissolved. In June 1951 the anarcho-communists created a 'Japan Anarchist Club' (Nihon Anakisuto Kurabu). Significantly, Sakutarō Iwasa followed the communists in joining the Club, depriving the Federation of a central figure.

=== Refounding ===
By 1956, the Japanese Anarchist Federation had been reformed, albeit without reuniting with the communist faction. In that year, the JAF started publishing a new journal, Kurohata ('Black Flag'), which was later renamed Jiyu-Rengo ('Libertarian Federation'). Within the latter, a new anarchist theorist named Ōsawa Masamichi began to rise to prominence. He advocated a more gradual revolution, focusing on the social and cultural rather than the political. His ideas were controversial, decried by some as 'revisionist', but he firmly established a more reformist strand within the anarchist movement.

=== Direct action ===
As an anarchist movement, the Federation supported direct action on multiple occasions through its lifespan. One of the most significant of these was the national opposition to the Japan-US Security Treaty in 1960. Huge demonstrations swept major cities, and the Sōhyō union and others staged strikes of around 4 to 6 million workers. Nonetheless, the treaty was accepted by the government. Disillusionment with constitutional politics led the 'Mainstream' faction of the Zengakuren student movement to join with the JAF in calling for political violence as a form of protest.

A similar protest broke out in 1965 against the treaty with South Korea, with a similar result. Ōsawa commented in Jiyu-Rengo that the government's action was an 'outrage', but that this had happened repeatedly - and that each time a 'threat to parliamentary democracy' was talked about by journalists, two camps of party politicians furiously decried the other's action, but then proceeded to make a truce and ignore the problem.

Out of this disillusionment, anarchism gained ground within the protest movement, including the Zenkyoto student power movement created during anti-Vietnam War protests. The rise of protest groups encouraged the Japanese Anarchist Federation to declare 'The Opening of the Era of Direct Action' in 1968. This culminated in the occupation of Tokyo University by anarchist students for several months in 1968.

The anarchism espoused by these students was not that of the JAF, however. The 'Council of United Struggle' at the university declared that they were "aristocratic anarchists", struggling not on behalf of the worker but for themselves, attempting to deny their own aristocratic attributes by engaging in political struggle. Ōsawa, for example, approved of the use of violent tactics, but feared that it was too separated from the masses, claiming that "it would come to a new Stalinism" even if it did succeed.

== Legacy ==
The separation of the Japanese Anarchist Federation from the contemporary political protests demonstrated the weakness of the organisation. In 1968, the organisation was finally disbanded. It resolved "creatively to dissolve" in an attempt to formulate new forms of organisation, and announced its dissolution formally in Jiyu-Rengo on the 1st January 1969.

Its anarcho-communist rival, the Japan Anarchist Club, remained active until March 1980. Another group calling itself the Japanese Anarchist Federation was formed in October 1988.

== See also ==
- Anarchism in Japan
