= Sanshiro =

Sanshiro may refer to:

- Plawres Sanshiro, a popular anime series aired in 1983 in Japan, Hong Kong, the Middle East and Greece and Algeria
- Sanshiro Sugata, the directorial debut of the Oscar-winning Japanese film director Akira Kurosawa
- Sanshiro Sugata Part II, a 1945 film written and directed by Akira Kurosawa.
- Segata Sanshiro, a fictional character created by Sega to advertise the Sega Saturn in Japan between 1997 and 1998
- Sanshirō (novel), a novel written in 1908 by Natsume Sōseki, about a young man coming of age in the late Meiji Period

== People with the given name ==
- Sanshiro Abe (阿部 三子郎, born 1970), Japanese wrestler
- Ishikawa Sanshirō (石川 三四郎, 1876-1956), Japanese Christian socialist
- Sanshiro Murao (村尾 三四郎, born 2000), Japanese judoka
- Sanshiro Takagi (高木 三四郎, born 1975), Japanese professional wrestler
