= Shinkigen =

- Editor: Abe Isoo
- Editor: Sen Katayama
- Editor: Kinoshita Naoe
- Editor: Ishikawa Sanshirō
- Categories: Christian socialism; Humanism; Social democracy
- Frequency: Monthly
- Founded: 1905
- First issue: November 10, 1905; 120 years ago
- Final issue: November 1906; 119 years ago
- Country: Empire of Japan
- Based in: Tokyo
- Language: Japanese

Shinkigen (新紀元, Shinjiken; "New Era") was a socialist monthly magazine, published in Tokyo, Japan, between November 1905 and November 1906.

== History and profile ==
Shinkigen emerged after the October 1905 split in the Heiminsha. The first issue was published on November 10, 1905. Shinkigen was the organ of the reformist socialist group, dominated by Christian social democrats. Shinkigen was edited by personalities such as Abe Isoo, Sen Katayama, Sanshiro Ishikawa, and Naoe Kinoshita. Shinkigen argued in favour of universal suffrage and social reform (through parliamentary means). The first issue of the magazine included an article by Uchimura Kanzō, which stated "Though I am not a socialist, I cannot refrain from the greatest sympathy for this gentemanly work."

Shinkigen was characterized by a humanistic worldview. Its conception of socialism was spiritualistic and highly individualistic. The magazine frequently featured (Christian) religious motifs, with imagery such having an angel or a shining cross depicted on the cover page or with article titles such as 'The Revolutionary Thought of Mother Mary'. The magazine did however also feature criticisms of Christianity.

In February 1906 Shinkigen and the other faction that emerged from Heiminsha, the materialists, founded a political party together, the Japan Socialist Party.

Like other leftwing and liberal media, Shinkigen was targeted by government repression. All in all, thirteen issues of Shinkigen were published. The Japan Socialist Party survived until February 1907, when it was banned by police following its first party congress.

In 1961, a volume containing the editions of Shinkigen were reprinted by Meiji Bunken Shiryo Kankokai.

== See also ==
- Socialist thought in Imperial Japan
