= Yorozu Chōhō =

Japanese daily newspaper

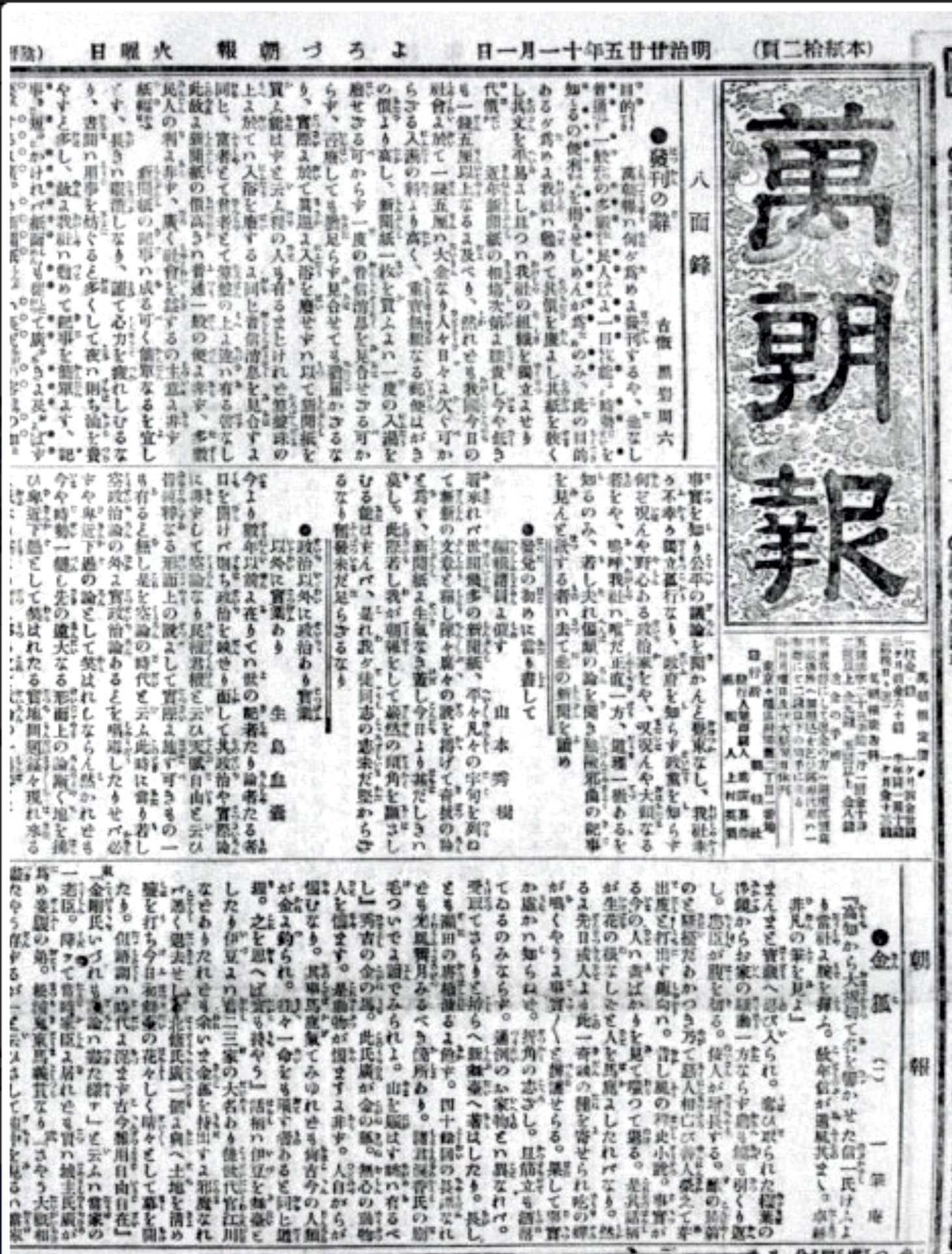
- Yorozu Chōhō, 1892
- Type: Daily newspaper
- Founder(s): Kuroiwa Shūroku
- Founded: November 1, 1892
- Ceased publication: 1940
- Country: Japan

The Yorozu Chōhō (萬朝報; lit. 'Complete Morning Report') was a Japanese daily newspaper founded by Kuroiwa Shūroku. Founded on November 1, 1892, the newspaper took a pro-civilian stance. The newspaper ceased publication in 1940 and was incorporated into Tokyo Maiyu Shimbun.

== History ==
Founded by Kuroiwa Shūroku on November 1, 1892, the newspaper was originally published as a tabloid to appeal to the working class. The newspaper is cheap and easy to read, which also had a penchant for pursuing scandals and had been ordered to cease publication by the government on several occasions. Kuroiwa Shūroku also published some of his own short translations in this newspaper. While the United States was experiencing "yellow journalism", the situation was somewhat different in Japan, where Yorozu Chōhō was one of the first to print newspapers on red paper, and where news that struck a chord with the people came to be known as "red newspapers". By the end of the 1890s, however, it had become one of the most widely published newspapers in Japan had attracted some celebrities such as Kōtoku Shūsui and Uchimura Kanzō.

In early 1901, the paper's editors became involved in a labor dispute, and subsequently Risōdan (Ideal corps), a Christian socialist group focused on the rights of Japanese workers, was formed within the paper. After the outbreak of the Russo-Japanese War, the newspaper initially took an anti-war stance, but then adopted a pro-war, pro-government stance, which led to the resignations of Kōtoku Shūsui, Uchimura Kanzō, and Sakai Toshihiko. Sales of this newspaper plummeted during the war.

After the Russo-Japanese War, the newspaper was further commercialized, and many stores were opened under its name. After the High Treason incident, this newspaper publicly criticized its former employee, Kōtoku Shūsui.

In 1940, the newspaper ceased publication and was incorporated into Tokyo Maiyu Shimbun.
