= Rousoukai =

Japanese think tank

Rousoukai (老壮会, The Society for Old Combatants) was a Japanese think tank which attracted participants from both the left-wing and right-wing of Japanese politics. It was founded on 9 October 1918 and continued until 1921.

== Members ==
=== Left-wing ===
- Sakai Toshihiko
