= International League for Darker People =

The International League for Darker People was created on 2 January 1919 on an estate on the banks of the Hudson River owned by Madam C. J. Walker. The purpose of the organisation was to bring together African-Americans with other non-European people to pursue coherent shared goals at the Paris Peace Conference, 1919.

Walker was joined by Marcus Garvey, A. Philip Randolph, and Adam Clayton Powell, Sr.

Walker initiated links between the League and the Japanese publisher Shuroku Kuroiwa.
