= Japan Socialist Party (1906) =

Japan Socialist Party 日本社会党
- Japanese name: Nihon Shakai-tō
- Leader: Sakai Toshihiko
- Founded: 24 February 1906; 120 years ago
- Dissolved: 22 February 1907; 119 years ago
- Headquarters: Tokyo, Japan
- Ideology: Socialism; Factions: Social democracy; Anarcho-syndicalism
- Political position: Left-wing to far-left

The Japan Socialist Party (日本社会党, Nihon Shakai-tō) was a socialist political party in Japan that existed for a brief period during the late Meiji era. It was founded on 24 February 1906, becoming the first legal socialist party in the country's history. The party's legalization took place during a significant, albeit temporary, liberalization under the government of Saionji Kinmochi.

From its inception, it was beset by internal ideological conflict between two main factions. One, led by figures like Sakai Toshihiko and Tazoe Tetsuji, advocated for a moderate parliamentary strategy and universal suffrage. The other, led by Kōtoku Shūsui following his return from the United States, rejected parliamentary politics in favor of direct action, specifically advocating for a general strike as the primary means of social revolution.

This ideological struggle came to a head at the party's first and only annual convention in February 1907. Although neither faction won a decisive victory, the party's platform adopted a more radical tone, alarming the government. Citing the party's open debates on anarchism and direct action, the Saionji government ordered its dissolution on 22 February 1907, just under a year after its formation. Its brief existence and subsequent suppression marked a turning point, ushering in a period of increased government hostility towards leftist movements in Japan.

== Background and founding ==
The formation of the Japan Socialist Party occurred in a political climate shaped by the aftermath of the Russo-Japanese War (1904–1905) and the failure of earlier socialist organizing efforts. In 1901, Japan's first socialist party, the Social Democratic Party (社会民主党, Shakai Minshutō), had been formed by six intellectuals, including Kōtoku Shūsui and Katayama Sen, but was banned by the government on the day of its founding under the restrictive Peace Police Law of 1900.

During the Russo-Japanese War, the socialist anti-war movement centered around the newspaper Heimin Shimbun, but this too was suppressed by the end of the war, and its key figures, including Kōtoku, were imprisoned. However, the postwar period saw a period of recession and significant labor unrest, particularly over high taxes and proposed streetcar fare hikes in Tokyo. In January 1906, the more liberal cabinet of Saionji Kinmochi replaced the government of General Katsura Tarō. This shift provided an opening for socialist organizers.

The party agreed to be a merger of the former "Japan Socialist Party" led by Sakai Toshihiko and the "Nihon Heimin-tō" (日本平民党, "Common People's Party of Japan") led by Kōnirō Nishikawa.

In mid-February 1906, Sakai Toshihiko and Fukao Shō petitioned the new government to officially establish a socialist party. To their surprise, the petition was granted. The Japan Socialist Party was formally inaugurated on 24 February 1906 at the office of Katō Tokijirō, a physician sympathetic to the socialist cause. It was the first time a socialist party had been legally recognized in Japan.

== Ideological conflict ==
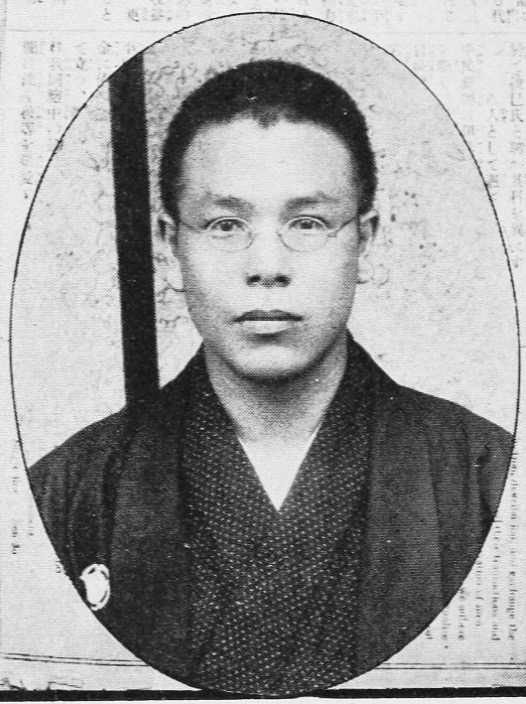
Sakai Toshihiko

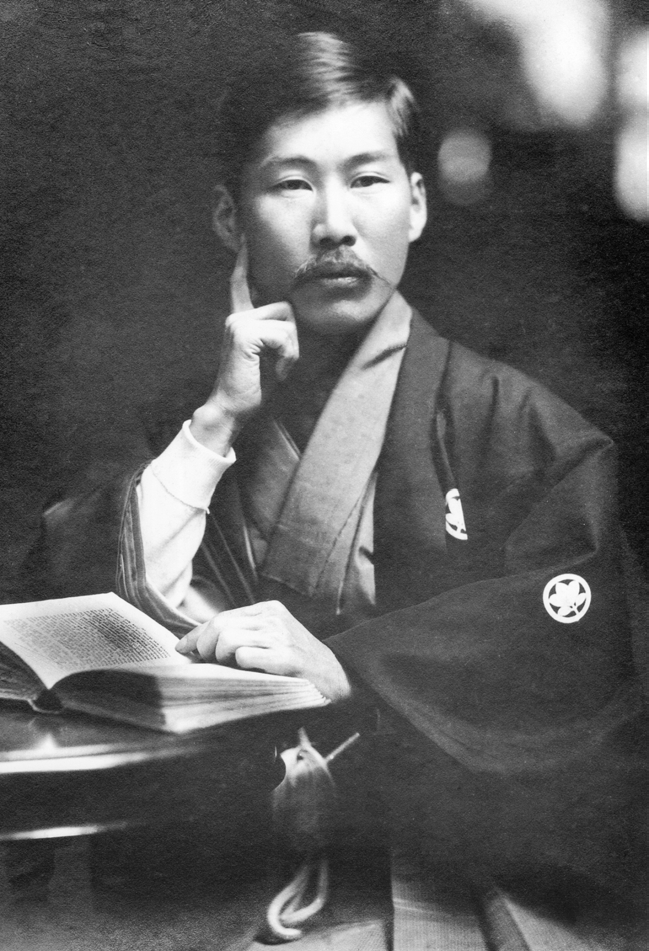
Kōtoku Shūsui

From its beginning, the Japan Socialist Party was a coalition of differing ideologies, which soon crystallized into two opposing factions. The initial leadership, including figures like Sakai Toshihiko, Katayama Sen, and Tazoe Tetsuji, advocated for a moderate, parliamentary strategy. They believed in operating "within the limits of the law", focusing on achieving universal suffrage and electing representatives to the Diet to bring about social change.

This moderate consensus was shattered by the return of Kōtoku Shūsui from the United States in June 1906. His experiences abroad, particularly with the anarcho-syndicalist Industrial Workers of the World (IWW), had convinced him that parliamentary politics was a futile "sop" designed to dupe the working class. On 28 June 1906, Kōtoku delivered a highly influential speech, "The Tide of the World Revolutionary Movement", to a large audience in Kanda, Tokyo. He rejected the "peaceful, lawful, and constitutional" model of German social democracy and instead called for "direct action" (直接行動, chokusetsu kōdō) by workers, culminating in a general strike, as the only effective means to achieve a social revolution.

Kōtoku's speech caused a major rift in the party, dividing it into two factions:

- The Parliamentary Policy Faction (議会政策論, gikai seisaku-ron), or "soft" faction, led by Katayama and Tazoe, which remained committed to social democracy and electoral politics.
- The Direct Action Faction (直接行動論, chokusetsu kōdō-ron), or "hard" faction, led by Kōtoku, which advocated for revolutionary syndicalism and the rejection of parliamentary tactics.

== First annual convention ==
The ideological struggle between the two factions came to a head at the party's first annual convention, held over two days in mid-February 1907 at the Kinkikan hall in Kanda. The central issue of the convention was the party's official platform. Sakai Toshihiko, as Chairman of the Executive Committee, attempted to broker a compromise by drafting a resolution that was deliberately ambiguous on the question of tactics.

The compromise failed. Tazoe Tetsuji immediately proposed an amendment to clarify the party's stance, adding the clause: "our party recognizes parliamentary participation as an effective means of action". Kōtoku countered with his own amendment, which stated: "our party recognizes the uselessness of parliamentary participation, and solely endeavors to awaken the class consciousness of the workers, making every effort to train and organize them".

The opposing sides were given time to debate their positions. Kōtoku, though ill, delivered a powerful and emotional speech arguing for his direct action platform. When the vote was held, Tazoe's moderate amendment received only two votes, while Kōtoku's radical amendment received twenty-two. However, Kōtoku's vote count was still eight short of a majority, so the Executive Committee's original compromise draft was ultimately approved.

While Kōtoku did not achieve an outright victory, his faction had won a significant moral victory. The party had refused to explicitly endorse a parliamentary strategy, and its approved platform contained radical elements, such as support for the rioters at the Ashio Copper Mine and a declaration of solidarity with "all the world's revolutionary movements". This shift toward a more radical stance did not go unnoticed by the government.

== Suppression and dissolution ==
The Japanese government, led by Saionji Kinmochi, had legalized the Socialist Party on the condition that it would operate as a lawful body. The party's open debate on anarchism and direct action, and its increasingly radical tone, were seen as a violation of this understanding. The government, already under pressure from conservatives like Yamagata Aritomo to take a harder line on "dangerous thoughts", moved swiftly.

On 22 February 1907, just three days after the convention ended, the Home Minister ordered the dissolution of the Japan Socialist Party, citing that its platform was "detrimental to public peace and order". The party's newspaper, the daily Heimin Shimbun, faced multiple lawsuits and was forced to cease publication by April 1907.

== Legacy ==
The Japan Socialist Party of 1906 existed for less than a year, but its brief history was a crucial moment in the development of the Japanese left. It was the first and, for a decade, the only legal socialist party in the country. Its internal debate between social democracy and anarcho-syndicalism reflected the larger ideological schisms occurring within the international socialist movement at the time. Its suppression marked the end of the brief political opening that had followed the Russo-Japanese War and the beginning of the "winter years" (冬の時代, fuyu no jidai), a period of intense government repression of all leftist and radical thought that would last until the 1920s.

== See also ==
- High Treason Incident
- Shakai Taishūtō
