= Kuroiwa Shūroku =

Japanese journalist, novelist and translator

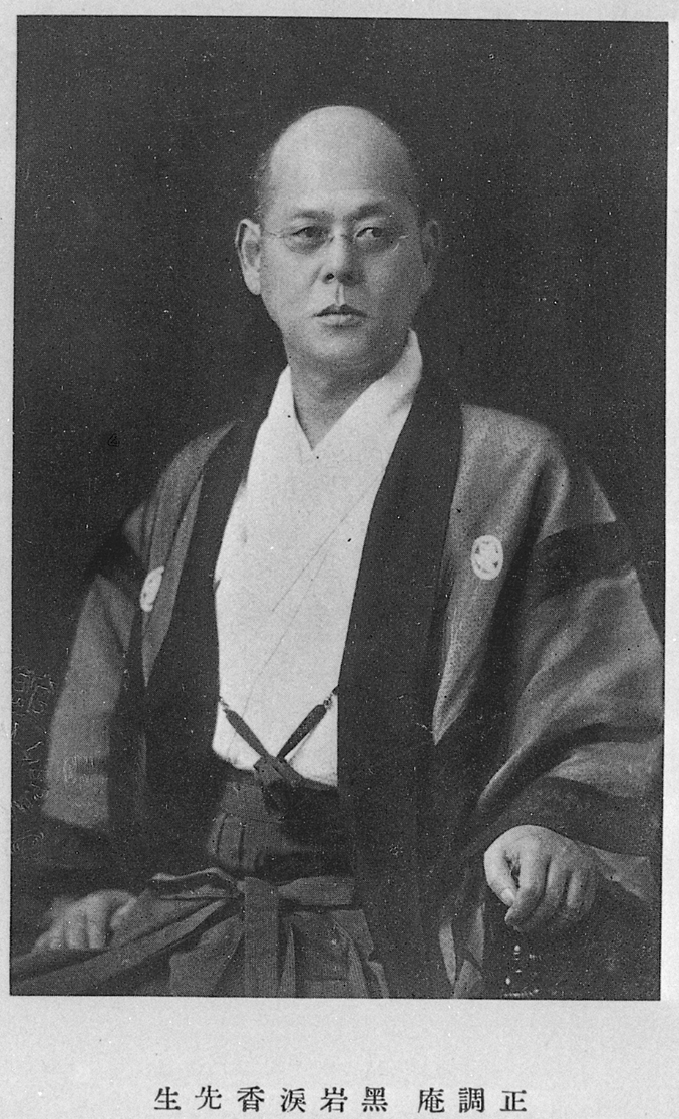
- Born: September 29, 1862
- Died: October 6, 1920 (aged 58)
- Occupations: Journalist, novelist, translator
- Writing career
- Pen name: Kuroiwa Ruikō

Kuroiwa Shūroku (黒岩 周六, Kuroiwa Shūroku; 29 September 1862 – 6 October 1920), also known as Kuroiwa Ruikō (黒岩 涙香), was a Japanese journalist, novelist and translator. He founded Yorozu Chōhō in 1892, which soon became one of Japan's largest newspapers. He translated more than 100 French and English language novels into the Japanese language.

In 1919, while on his way to the Paris Peace Conference, Kuroiwa met with Madam C. J. Walker of the International League for Darker People to discuss a shared strategy at the conference.

His Dharma name, which he chose himself, was Kuroiwain Shūroku Ruikō Chūten Koji (黒岩院周六涙香忠天居士).

== Works ==
- On Hearing of the Devotional Self-Immolation of General Nogi (1912) published in English in Learning Sacred Way Of Emperor by Yukata Hibino.
