= Sawara District, Fukuoka =

Former district in Fukuoka Prefecture, Japan

Sawara (早良郡, Sawara-gun) was a district located in Fukuoka Prefecture, Japan. The district was dissolved on March 1, 1975, when the town of Sawara merged into the expanded city of Fukuoka.
