= Motojirō Ozaki =

Japanese politician

- 尾崎 元次郎
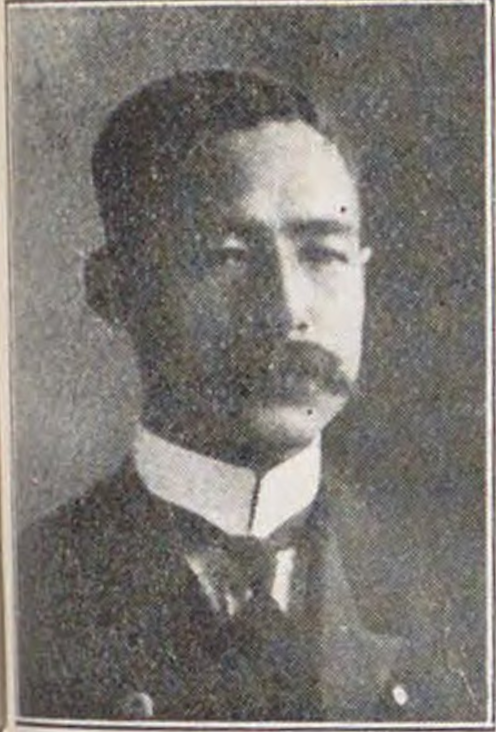
- Ozaki in 1917

Mayor of Shizuoka
- In office October 1942 – August 1944
- Preceded by: Seiji Inamori
- Succeeded by: Michinosuke Miyazaki
- In office October 1935 – June 1938
- Preceded by: Suga Sadahito
- Succeeded by: Seiji Inamori

Member of the House of Peers
- In office 29 September 1925 – 28 September 1932 Nominated by the Emperor

Member of the House of Representatives
- In office 15 May 1912 – February 1920
- Preceded by: Kunpei Matsumoto
- Succeeded by: Constituency abolished
- Constituency: Shizuoka City

Personal details
- Born: 5 October 1870 Shizuoka, Japan
- Died: 9 January 1945 (aged 74)
- Party: Independent

Motojirō Ozaki (尾崎 元次郎, Ozaki Motojirō; 5 October 1870 – 9 January 1945) was a Japanese politician and businessman, member of the House of Representatives and of the House of Peers.

== Background ==
Ozaki served as Shizuoka City Education Chairman, Shizuoka Taisei Junior/Senior High School, Shizuoka Blind Dormitory School President, high level positions in several banks, Shizuoka Veteran Association president and others. In addition, he created Shizuoka Shōnen Association (静岡少年軍団), a predecessor of Shizuoka Scout Council Boy Scouts, and also worked on social education for young people.

Yoshinori Futara, the head of school affairs for Shizuoka Prefecture, introduced Shō Fukao to Ozaki. The Shizuoka Shōnen Gundan (Note: 静岡少年軍団 Shizuoka Shōnen Gundan, "Shizuoka Boys' Army Corps") ("Shizuoka Boys' Army Corps") was formed in June 1913 with Ozaki as leader and Fukao and Keijirō Takasugi (Note: 高杉啓次郎 Takasugi Keijirō) as directors. 111 members took part in the enrollment ceremony at Sengen Shrine. Takasugi wanted Fukao removed for his previous activity as a socialist, but Ozaki supported Fukao.

In 1955 he posthumously received the highest distinction of the Boy Scouts of Japan, the Golden Pheasant Award. His second son Tadatsugu Ozaki, a Boy Scouts of Japan pioneer and later Shizuoka Scout Council President, received the distinction in 1979. His third son Shinpei Iwanami, a President of TEPCO and Boy Scouts of Nippon director, received the distinction in 1994.
