= Abe Isoo =

Japanese politician

- 安部 磯雄
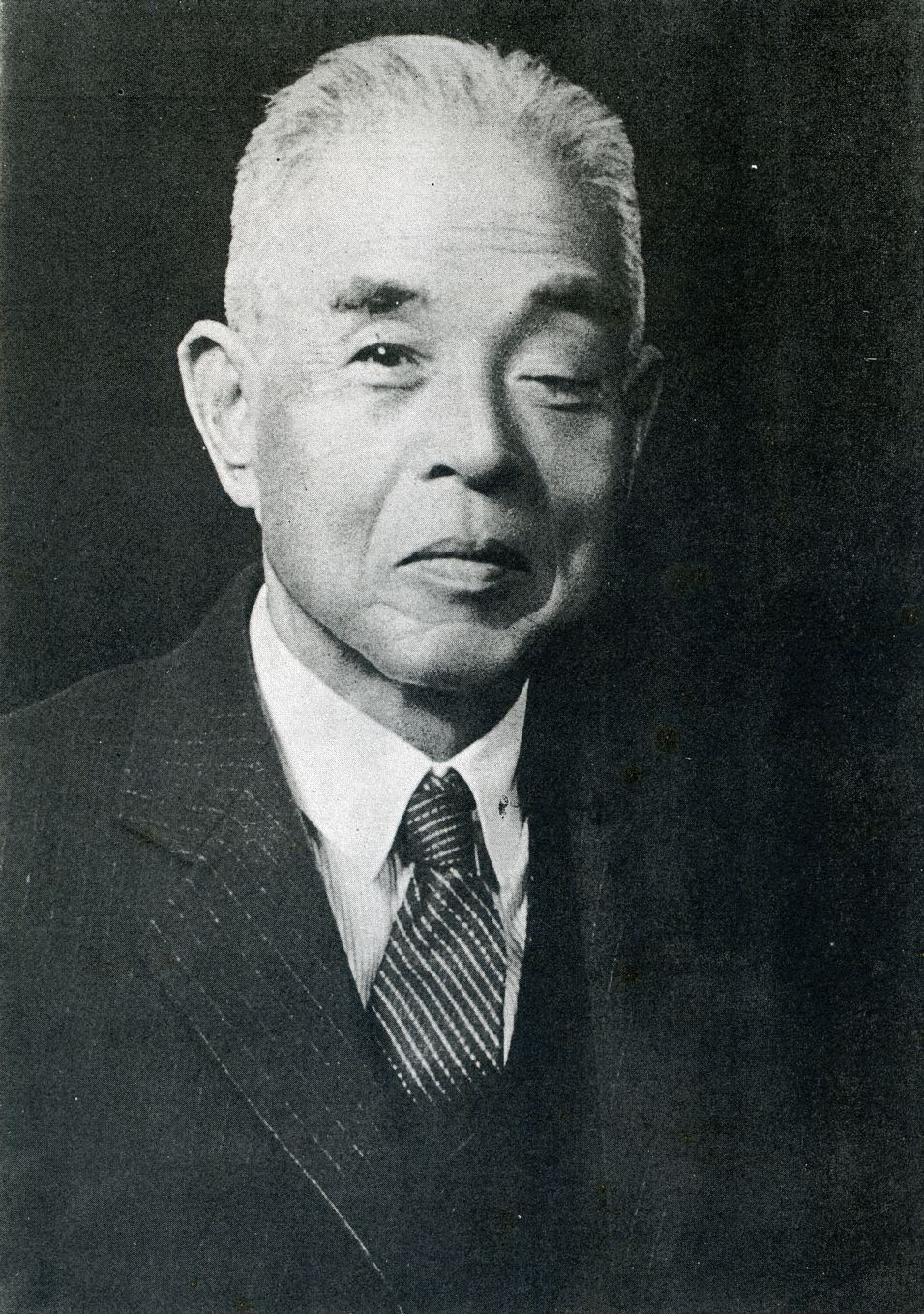
- Abe in 1935

Chairman of the Shakai Taishūtō
- In office 24 July 1932 – 21 March 1940
- Preceded by: Position established
- Succeeded by: Position abolished

Chairman of the Social Democratic Party
- In office 5 December 1926 – 24 July 1932
- Preceded by: Position established
- Succeeded by: Position abolished

Member of the House of Representatives
- In office 20 February 1932 – 21 January 1941
- Preceded by: Gorō Akatsuka
- Succeeded by: Hisashi Kawaguchi
- Constituency: Tokyo 2nd
- In office 21 February 1928 – 21 January 1930
- Preceded by: Constituency established
- Succeeded by: Gorō Akatsuka
- Constituency: Tokyo 2nd

Personal details
- Born: 4 February 1865 Sawara, Fukuoka, Japan
- Died: 10 February 1949 (aged 84) Shinjuku, Tokyo, Japan
- Party: Shakai Taishūtō (1932–1940)
- Other political affiliations: SDP 1901 (1901); SDP 1926 (1926–1932)
- Education: Doshisha University; University of Berlin; Hartford Theological Seminary

Abe Isoo (安部 磯雄; 4 February 1865 – 10 February 1949) was a Japanese Christian socialist, teacher, pastor, economist, parliamentarian and pacifist.

Abe actively promoted socialism from a Christian humanitarian standpoint and was a pioneer of the Japanese socialist movement. He also largely contributed to the development of baseball in Japan, and was called "Father of Japanese baseball." He was the founder of the baseball club of Waseda University.

== Early life and education ==
Abe was born in Fukuoka on 4 February 1865. He entered at Doshisha University in 1879, and got baptized by Joseph Hardy Neesima at February 2, 1882. In 1898, he created the first Consumers' co-operative of university in Japan at Doshisha. After he graduated from Doshissha, he studied abroad, including at the University of Berlin, before attending Hartford Theological Seminary in Hartford, Connecticut. It was while he was studying in Hartford that he became interested in socialism.

== Career ==
After returning to Japan, in 1899, Abe became a Unitarian preacher. He taught at the Waseda University starting in 1901, called Tokyo Semmon Gakko, at the time. He later became a faculty of political science and economics and taught there for 25 years. He occupied some important positions in the university like a dean of first School of Political Science and Economics and University Vice President. In 1901 he helped to found the short-lived Japanese Social Democratic Party, which the government swiftly prohibited.

During the Russo-Japanese War, he advocated non-cooperation and participated in various early feminist movements. When the anti-war newspaper Heimin Shimbun (People's Weekly News) was banned, he started his own magazine, Shinkigen (A New Era). He used this as a soapbox to promote parliamentary socialism. In 1906, he played an instrumental role in founding the first Japanese Socialist Party, from which he advocated a Christian Socialist viewpoint. However, the government outlawed this party too in 1907. He dropped out of public life until after World War I, when he became active again. He founded the Japanese Fabian Society, in 1921, and in 1924, he became their first President. He resigned his teaching post to become the secretary-general of the Social Democratic Party. In 1928, he was elected to the Japanese Diet, where he held a seat for five consecutive elections. In 1932, he became a chairman of Shakai Taishuto (Social Mass Party). He withdrew from politics in 1940 due to the increasingly militaristic nature of the government of the time.

== Father of Baseball in Japan ==
Abe contributed to the development and spread of baseball in Japan because he believed that personality was built with sports like knowledge was built with learning. Becoming the first manager of Waseda Baseball Club in 1901, he started the Waseda–Keio rivalry. In 1905, during the Russo-Japanese War, he took the team to the United States and brought many techniques back to Japan, spreading them with his books. He also established the Japan Amateur Sports Association (later, Japan Sport Association) together with Jigoro Kano. He later helped with organizing the first Japanese Olympic team competing at the 1912 Summer Olympics in Stockholm. In 1930, Abe became the first chairman of the Tokyo Big6 Baseball League. After World War II, he also became the first chairman of Japan Student Baseball Association.

He is called the 'Father of Baseball in Japan' or the 'Father of Student Baseball' in Japan because of such contributions. Totsuka Ground, the main stadium of Waseda's baseball team changed its name to Abe Ground in 1949, following Abe's death. When the Japanese Baseball Hall of Fame was opened in 1959, he was inducted into the hall.

== Selected Works ==
- Shakai mondai kaishakuhō (Social Problem Interpretation Methods). Tokyo Senmon Gakko. (1901)
- Shūkyō to seinen no genki (Religion and the Vitality of Youth). Rikugō zasshi, no. 284. (1904)
- Yakyū to gakusei (Baseball and the Student). Co-authored with Oshikawa Shurō; Kobundō shoten. (1911)
- "Shisō no zendō to sanji seigen" (The Advance of Thought and Birth Limitation). Bunka seikatsu magazine. (1924)
- Futsū senkyo to Musan seitō (Universal Suffrage and the Proletarian Party). Nihon Fabian Society. (1927)
- Shakai minshūtō kōryō (Platform of the Social Democratic Party). Kurara sha. (1929)
- Kokumin no shinpan ni uttō (An Appeal to the Judgment of the People). Senshinsha. (1930)
- Sangyō hōkan ron (Theory of Industrial Stewardship). Chikura shobo. (1932)
- Watashi no chūkun aikoku kan (My View of Loyalty and Patriotism). Kensetsusha. (1943)

== See also ==
- Shinkigen
