= Red Flag Incident =

1908 political rally in Japan

The Red Flag Incident (Japanese: 赤旗事件, Hepburn: Akahata Jiken) refers to a political rally that took place in Tokyo, Japan, on June 22, 1908.

In the mixed political climate of the late Meiji and early Taishō period, celebrated political activist and anarchist Koken Yamaguchi was discharged from a term in prison. His release was met with by a crowd waving red flags carrying Anarchist Communist slogans such as Museifu Kyōsan (無政府共産; "anarcho-communism") and Kakumei (革命; "revolution") and a chorus of communist songs. The police attacked and suppressed the small demonstration, and ten prominent activists, including Ōsugi Sakae, Hitoshi Yamakawa, Kanno Sugako, and Kanson Arahata, were arrested.

In later trials, most of the arrested were found guilty and received sentences of one year or more, with Ōsugi receiving the longest prison term (of two and a half years). Although a relatively minor event in the complicated history of Meiji politics, it gained notability later, when the incarceration of certain participants in the rally (including Ōsugi, Yamakawa and Arahata) protected them from being involved in a much more prominent crackdown, the High Treason Incident, which resulted in a number of activists being sentenced to death.

This incident marked the start of stronger government action against the socialist movement in Japan.

== Gendered depictions ==
Several major Japanese newspapers focused on four young women from among the arestees who had fought with police officers, describing them as "anarchist beauties". According to Tomoko Seto, writing in Radical History Review, trial coverage drew attention to the women's "righteous devotion to their political cause". Seto has argued that media attention to these women socialists contributed to "the broad dissemination of socialism" and "spurred the political engagement of women with the news media". Seto has suggested that these media depictions went on "to serve as a vehicle for political inspiration for subsequent generations of female activists".

== See also ==
- Katsura Tarō
