= Kiyoshi Kawakami =

Japanese Christian journalist

Kiyoshi "Karl" Kawakami (河上 清, Kawakami Kiyoshi; 8 August 1873 – 12 October 1949) was a Japanese Christian journalist who published several books in the United States and the United Kingdom. He was born in Yonezawa, educated in the law in Japan, and was for a short time engaged in newspaper work in that country.

He sometimes wrote under the name of K. K. Kawakami. Although Japanese do not have middle names, he is said to have been a socialist in his youth, when he apparently adopted the middle name "Karl" (from Karl Marx).

In 1901 he travelled to the United States and studied at the universities of Iowa and Wisconsin. In 1905, engaged in journalism, he traveled extensively in China, Siberia, and Russia. He was a correspondent for leading newspapers in Tokyo and a frequent contributor to American magazines and newspapers.

== Early life ==
Kiyoshi Kawakami was the youngest born into a family of three brothers and three sisters, with the given name of Yushichi Miyashita. His mother died probably related to childbirth, and his father died soon after. Within the next two years, his oldest brother died of war wounds and another brother died from an illness. He and his siblings lived with their grandmother in poverty, selling family belongings to put food on the table. When he was six years old he was put into the care of the local Shinto shrine in order to relieve food insecurity in the family.

He returned home, however, homesick, and was read to frequently by his grandmother. When he was eight years old, his grandmother sold more belongings to be able to send him to elementary school. He was able to go onto junior high school, where he learned English at the age of thirteen.

Kiyoshi Kawakami was fourteen years old when he heard his first pro-democracy speech at a playhouse in town. He was fifteen years old when he met his first foreigner, American Methodist missionary J.G. Cleveland who taught English at the Yonezawa junior-high school.

In 1890 at seventeen years old, Kawakami went to Tokyo, where he worked as a houseboy in exchange for educational opportunities provided by a growing number of sponsoring acquaintances, first among them Retired Navy Lieutenant Toshitoro Sone and including Mr. Shigenori Uesugi who helped him attend Tokyo Law Institute (at present the CHUO university).

After his sponsor Uesugi ended, he was admitted to English vocational school Aoyama Institute, now Aoyama Gakuin University, by Methodist minister Koichi Honda. It was at the Aoyama Institute that Kawakami acquired his nickname "Karl" after a new enthusiasm he found for Karl Marx — a nickname he began to use as a middle name, especially on his later published work. Upon leaving the Aoyama Institute at twenty-three, Kawakami taught English to noncommissioned officers and began a career as a freelance writer with an article for a youth magazine and a German history book for high-schoolers commissioned by publisher Otowa Ohashi.

== Writings ==
Kawakami's pre-war writings sought to whitewash the Japanese military and economic penetration and invasion of China and Manchuria, presenting Japanese actions as aimed at saving China from chaos and disintegration. At the same time, however, they presented China as "scheming" to distort and obstruct Japanese goodwill in order to turn Western opinion against Japan. He was regarded in the United States as an apologist for Japanese imperialism and was briefly arrested after the outbreak of war. Some of his writings were included in the massive, ten volume series "Japanese Propaganda: Selected Readings: A Collection" edited by Peter O'Connor of Musashino University and published by the University of Hawaii Press in 2004.

According to Gary Y. Okihiro, the Japanese government subsidized Kawakami to refute the hostile writers and establish a favorable image of Japanese in the American mind. Kawakami's books especially Asia at the Door (1914) and The Real Japanese Question (1921) tried to refute the false slanders generated by deceitful agitators and politicians. The books confront the main allegations regarding assimilation, and boast of the positive Japanese contributions to American economy and society, especially in Hawaii and California.

== Selected bibliography ==
- Political Ideas of the Modern Japan (1903)
- American-Japanese Relations: An Inside View of Japan's Policies and Purposes (1912)
- Asia at the Door (1914)
- Japan and World Politics (1917)
- Japan and World Peace (1919)
- The Real Japanese Question (1921). ISBN 0-405-11275-0
- Jokichi Takamine: A Record of His American Achievements (1928)
- Japan Speaks on the Sino-Japanese Crisis (1932)
- Manchoukuo: Child of Conflict (1933). ISBN 0-404-03639-2
- Japan in China, Her Motives and Aims (1938)

== See also ==
- Tanaka Memorial
