= Kanson Arahata =

Japanese labor leader (1887–1981)

- 荒畑 寒村
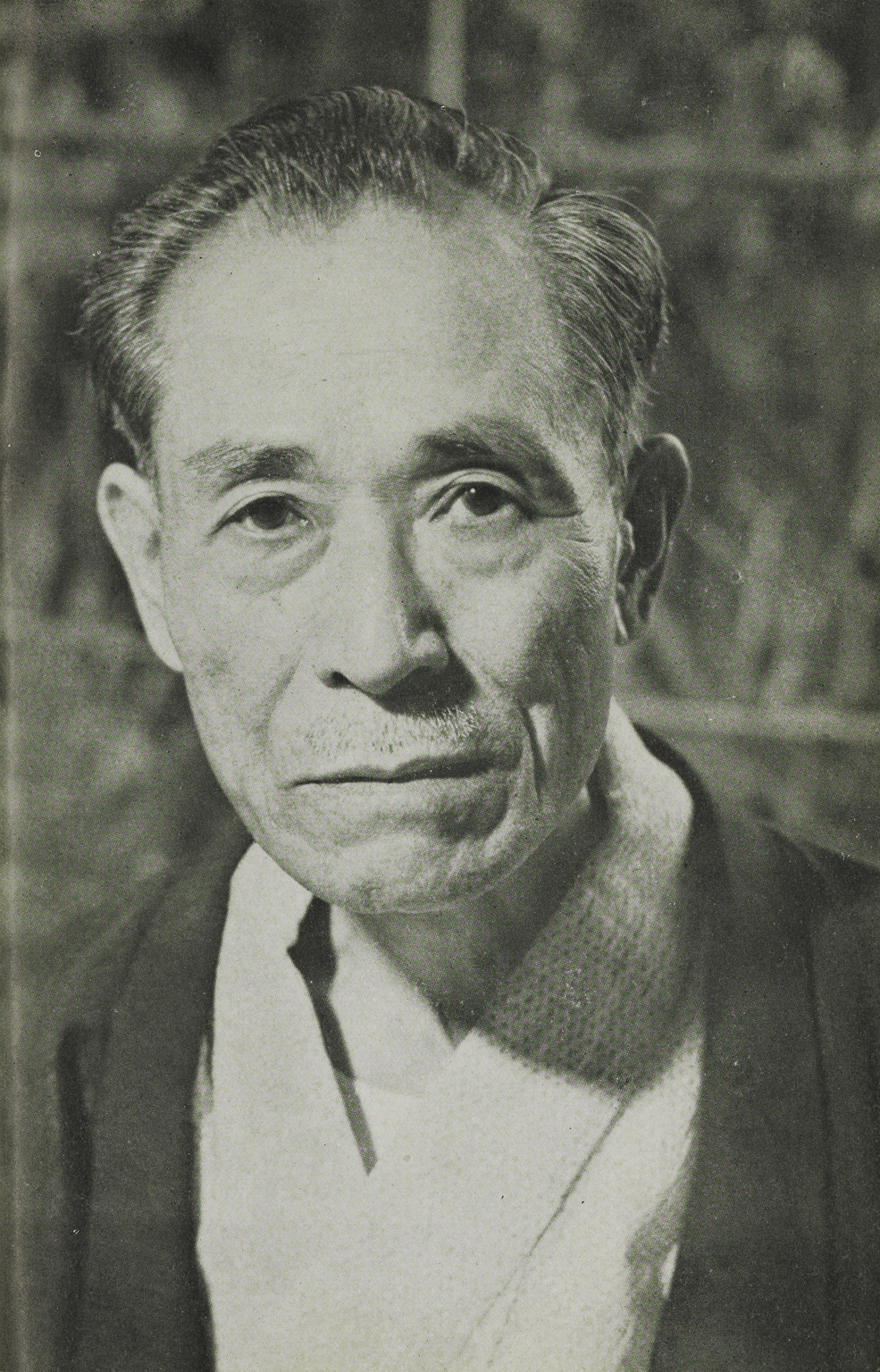
- Arahata in 1954

Chairman of the Japanese Communist Party
- In office 1922–1923
- Preceded by: Position established
- Succeeded by: Sakai Toshihiko

Member of the House of Representatives
- In office 11 April 1946 – 23 December 1948
- Preceded by: Constituency established
- Succeeded by: Yasoji Kazahaya
- Constituency: Tokyo 2nd (1946–1947); Tokyo 4th (1947–1948)

Personal details
- Born: Katsuzō Arahata (荒畑 勝三); 14 August 1887 Yokohama, Kanagawa, Japan
- Died: 6 March 1981 (aged 93) Setagaya, Tokyo, Japan
- Resting place: Fuji Cemetery & Gardens, Shizuoka Prefecture
- Party: Socialist
- Other political affiliations: Communist (1922–1945)
- Occupation: Critic, labor activist

Kanson Arahata (荒畑 寒村, Arahata Kanson; August 14, 1887 – March 6, 1981), real name Katsuzō Arahata (荒畑 勝三, Arahata Katsuzō), was a Japanese politician and writer active in the socialist and labor movements.

Born in Kanagawa Prefecture, he converted to socialism in 1904 while working at the Yokosuka Naval Arsenal, where he read anti-war pamphlets by Kōtoku Shūsui, Sakai Toshihiko, and other socialists. After the Russo-Japanese War, Arahata wrote for numerous socialist publications; his account of the Ashio Copper Mine incident is considered a classic of Japanese journalism. In 1922, Arahata helped found the Japanese Communist Party.

In 1937, he was arrested as part of the Japanese government's crackdown on socialists and communists and spent the following years in prison.

After World War II, he served on numerous labor committees, and was elected the first chairman of the National Trade Union of Metal and Engineering Workers. He also helped found the Japan Socialist Party in 1945, joining its Central Committee in 1947 and winning elections to the National Diet on its slate in 1946 and 1947. In 1948, Arahata's opposition to the party's approval of postal, tobacco tax, and train fare increases led him to leave its ranks. After a failed attempt to create a new socialist party, he lost his seat in the Diet in the 1949 election. In 1951, Arahata withdrew from active involvement in the socialist and labor movements, but continued to write and exercise influence. He died in 1981.
