= Sen Katayama =

Japanese journalist

- 片山 潜
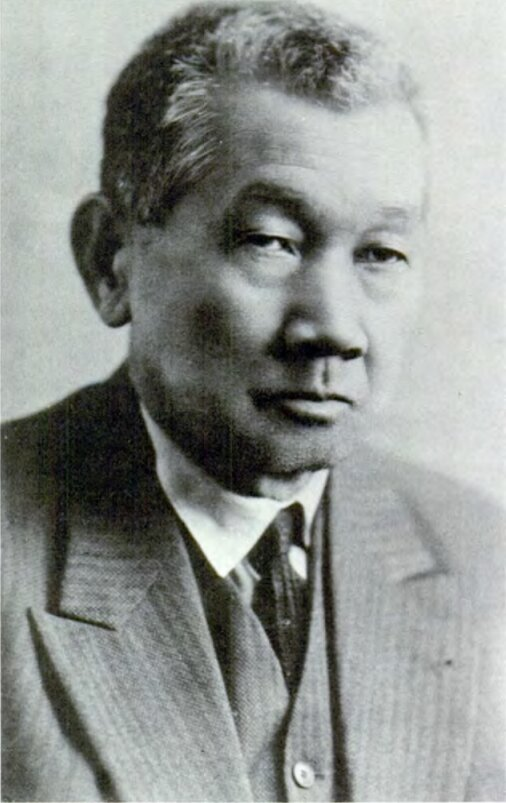
- Born: Yabuki Sugatarō; 26 December 1859; Okayama, Okayama Prefecture, Japan
- Died: 5 November 1933 (aged 73); Moscow, RSFSR, USSR
- Resting place: Kremlin Wall Necropolis, Moscow
- Education: Oka Juku (preparatory school), Grinnell College, Andover Theological Seminary, Yale Divinity School; Maryville College
- Occupations: Rice farmer, journalist, teacher, printer's apprentice, newspaper editor
- Known for: Co-founder of the Japanese Communist Party. Early member of the Communist Party USA.
- Criminal charges: Participation in the 1912 Tokyo Streetcar Strike
- Spouses: Fude.; Hari Tama.
- Children: 3 children
- Parent(s): Kunizo Yabuki, Kichi Yabuki

Sen Katayama (片山 潜, Katayama Sen; December 26, 1859 – November 5, 1933), born Yabuki Sugataro (藪木 菅太郎, Yabuki Sugatarō), was an early Japanese Marxist political activist and journalist, one of the original members of the CPUSA and co-founder, in 1922, of the Japanese Communist Party. After 1884, he spent most of his life abroad, especially in the United States and the Soviet Union, where he was very active in the international socialist community, and after 1920, the communist community. Katayama had a weak base inside Japan, and was little known there. However, in the rest of the world, he was widely hailed as a leading spokesman for the Japanese socialist and communist movements.

== Early life and education ==
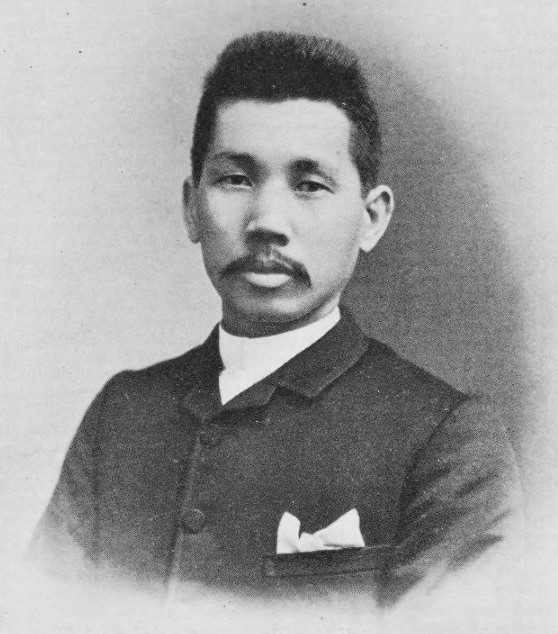
Katayama at 25 years old

Sugataro Yabuki was the second son born to Kunizo and Kichi Yabuki in 1859 in the Hadeki district of what would later become Japan's Okayama Prefecture. He was adopted by the Katayama family at nineteen and took the name Sen Katayama, becoming the Katayamas' "first son" after his birth mother was deserted by her husband. The adoption avoided Katayama's conscription and allowed him to continue his education. In his autobiography, Jiden (自伝), Katayama admitted that he was fortunate not to have been the first born in his birth family, as it saved him from some of the responsibilities that burdened some of his acquaintances.

In 1878, Katayama travelled to Tokyo to apprentice as a printer while studying at a small preparatory school, the Oka-Juku, where he formed a friendship with Iwasaki Kiyoshichi (岩崎清七), nephew of one of the founders of Mitsubishi. Iwasaki's departure for Yale University inspired Katayama to work his way to the United States, where he attended Maryville College in Maryville, Tennessee and Grinnell College, from which he graduated in 1892, proceeding to the Andover Theological Seminary and then to Yale Divinity School. During this period, Katayama became a Christian and a socialist.

== Career ==
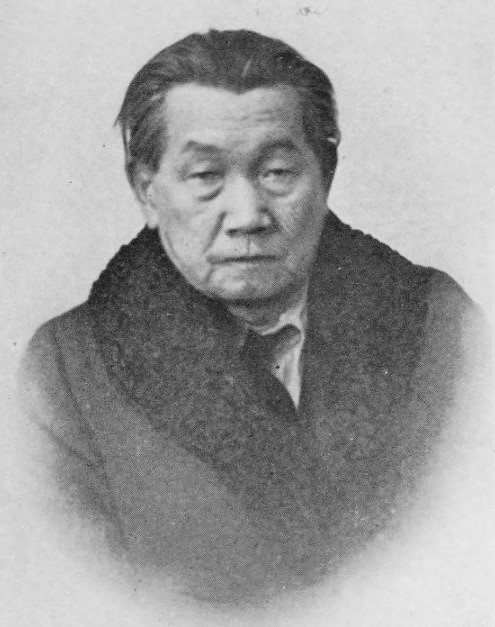
Katayama in 1925

Katayama returned to Japan in 1896 and from 1897 to 1901 edited Labour World (労働世界, Rōdō Sekai), the organ of the Iron Workers' Union (鉄工組合) and Trade Unions' Federation (労働組合期成会).

Katayama was a founding member of the Social Democratic Party, Japan's first socialist party, in 1901, but was forced to disband by the government one day later. He returned to America in 1903 at the urging of Iwasaki to look into rice-farming opportunities. During this trip he attended the Second International Socialist Congress in Amsterdam where he gained recognition for shaking hands with the Russian delegate, G. V. Plekhanov, in a gesture of amity between the Russian and Japanese peoples, despite the then-ongoing Russo-Japanese War.

In 1904, he attended an American Socialist Party convention in Chicago. He settled in Texas and his main business became rice farming. When his crop failed he became employed by a Japanese restaurant owner in Houston, Tsunekichi Okasaki, who bought 10,202 acres (41.29 km^{2}) of land in Texas with the plan that Katayama farm it. In late 1905, the two borrowed $100,000 from Iwasaki to fund the rice harvest, together forming a "Nippon Kono Kabushiki-gaisha" (Japan Farming Company) to develop the project, with Katayama as managing director. However, the company quickly dissolved, reputedly over Katayama's socialist leanings, and he returned to Japan in 1907, rejoined the socialist movement, and pursued a career in journalism.

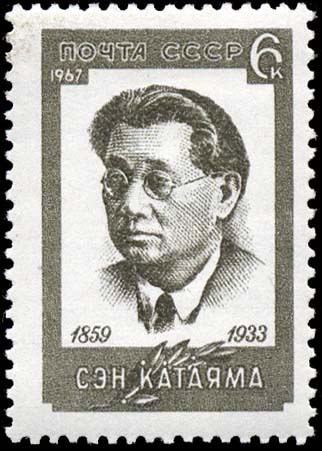
Postage stamp issued in the USSR in 1967, with a portrait of Sen Katayama (1859-1933).

He was arrested and jailed for his participation in the Tokyo Streetcar Strike of 1912, and after his release he left for California. Attracted by the success of the Bolshevik Revolution of 1917–1918, Katayama became an active communist and an officer for the Communist International. He travelled to Mexico and later to Moscow, where he was hailed as a leader of the Japanese communist movement. He remained in the Soviet Union until his death on November 5, 1933, and his ashes buried in the Kremlin Wall Necropolis in Red Square.

== Personal life ==
Katayama had two children by his first wife, Fude, who died in 1903, and another daughter by his second wife, Hari Tama, whom he married in 1907.

== Works ==
- The Labor Movement in Japan. Chicago: Charles H. Kerr & Co., 1918.
- Japan and Soviet Russia, The People's Russian Information Bureau, 1919.

== See also ==
- Shinkigen

== Works cited ==
- Swearingen, Rodger; Langer, Paul (1968). Red Flag In Japan: International Communism In Action 1919-1951. Greenwood Publishing Group. ISBN 0837168805.
