= Kōtoku Shūsui =

Japanese anarchist (1871–1911)

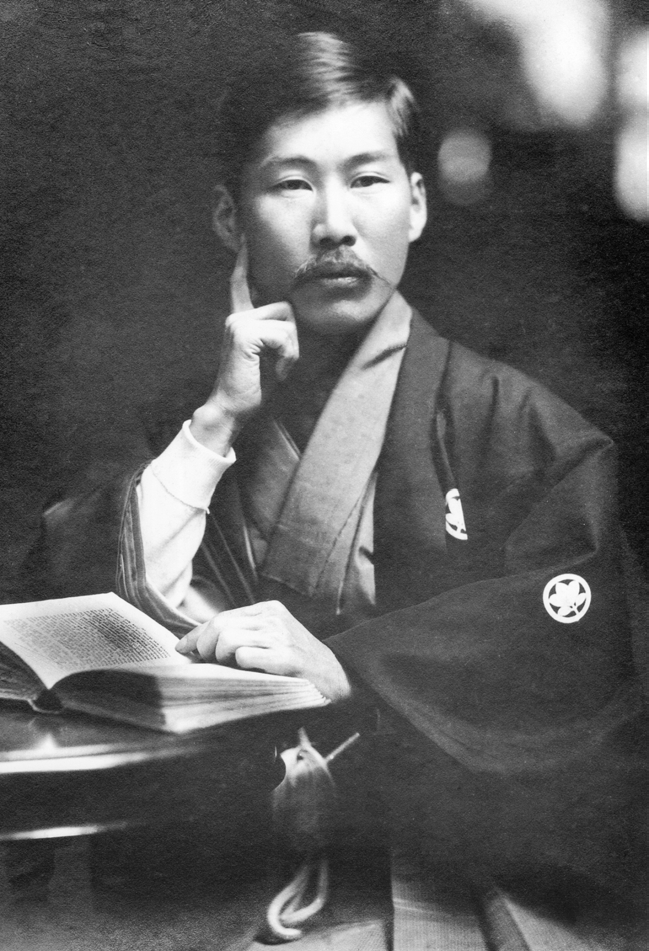
- Kōtoku in 1909
- Born: November 5, 1871; Nakamura, Kōchi, Empire of Japan
- Died: January 24, 1911 (aged 39); Ichigaya, Tokyo, Empire of Japan
- Cause of death: Execution by hanging
- Occupations: Journalist, anarchist, political agitator

Kōtoku Denjirō (幸徳 傳次郎; November 5, 1871 – January 24, 1911), better known by the pen name Kōtoku Shūsui (Japanese: 幸徳 秋水; Japanese pronunciation: [koːtokɯ ɕɯːsɯi]), was a Japanese socialist and anarchist who played a leading role in introducing anarchism to Japan in the early 20th century. Historian John Crump described him as "the most famous socialist in Japan".

He was a prominent figure in radical politics in Japan, opposing the Russo-Japanese War by founding the Heimin-sha group and its associated newspaper, Heimin Shinbun. Due to disregard for state press laws, the newspaper ceased publication in January 1905, and Kōtoku served five months in prison from February to July 1905. He subsequently left for the United States, spending November 1905 until June 1906 largely in California, and he came into contact with other prominent anarchist figures such as Peter Kropotkin.

Upon his return, he contributed to a divide within the left-wing movement between moderate social democrats and the more radical advocates of direct action, the latter of whom he supported. The growth of the 'direct action' faction led to the banning of the Japan Socialist Party in February 1907, and is arguably the beginning of Japan's modern anarchist movement. He was one of the 12 accused who were executed for treason by the Japanese government in the High Treason Incident in 1911, under suspicion of involvement in a bomb plot to assassinate the Japanese Emperor Meiji.

== Early life ==
Kōtoku was born in 1871 to a mother who came from a lower samurai family, and to a father who died shortly after his birth. Born in Tosa Province, one of the key supporters of the Meiji Restoration, he became influenced by the growing opposition to the new government. Tosa was a hotbed of resistance largely due to the discontent of samurais, whose power was declining, and Kōtoku became at a young age an ardent supporter of the pro-democracy Liberal Party.

At the age of 16, his school was destroyed by a typhoon, and he went to Tokyo in September 1887 to attend a private school that taught English. There he involved himself in public agitation, driven by the Liberal Party, calling for the abolition of the unequal treaties signed between Japan and Western powers, alongside freedom of speech. The government responded by barring more than 500 radicals from coming within seven miles of the Tokyo Imperial Palace, effectively exiling them from the capital.

As a result of this, he moved to Osaka in November 1888, where he became a 'disciple' of the older radical Nakae Chōmin. In the Confucian tradition, Kōtoku was loyal to his 'master', despite his egalitarian beliefs. They returned to Tokyo after an amnesty was issued alongside the new Meiji Constitution of 1889.

== Political career ==
In 1893, Kōtoku became the English translator for the Jiyu Shinbun, the newspaper of a newly reformed Liberal Party. He left this post in 1895, but still remained under Nakae's tutelage. However, when many liberals united with pro-government supporters of Itō Hirobumi in 1900 to form the right-wing Rikken Seiyūkai party, Kōtoku became disillusioned with liberalism. He is also described as a radical or radical-liberal because he supported anti-imperialism and anti-establishment lines, unlike mainstream liberals who defended imperialism at the time.

=== Socialism ===
In 1898, he joined the staff of the Yorozu Chōhō newspaper, wherein he published an article in 1900 condemning war in Manchuria. He published his first book in 1901, titled Imperialism, Monster of the Twentieth Century, which was a monumental work in the history of Japanese leftism, criticising both Japanese and Western imperialism from the point of view of a revolutionary socialist.

By now a committed socialist, he helped to found the Social Democratic Party. Despite the party's commitment to parliamentary tactics, it was immediately banned. He wrote another book in 1903, Quintessence of Socialism, acknowledging influence from Karl Marx. He also contributed articles to Sekai Fujin (Women of the World), a socialist women's newspaper.

=== Anti-war activism ===
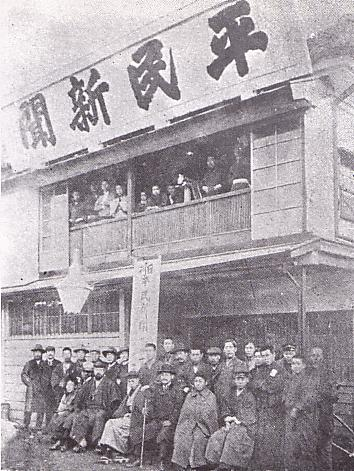
A photograph of the Heimin-sha (Commoners' Society), who published the Heimin Shinbun newspaper

In 1903, Yorozu Chōhō came out in support of war with Russia, as its editor decided to support the upcoming Russo-Japanese War. In protest against this decision, in October 1903 Kōtoku was one of a number of journalists who resigned to found the Heimin-sha group, alongside its associated anti-war Heimin Shinbun newspaper, which started publication in November.

A year after the founding of Heimin Shinbun, Kōtoku translated and published Marx's Communist Manifesto, for which he was fined. The newspaper was soon banned, publishing its last issue in January 1905, and Kōtoku was imprisoned from February to July 1905 for his involvement in the newspaper.

=== Self-exile ===
His imprisonment only gave him further opportunities to read leftist literature, and he claimed in August 1905 that "Indeed, I had gone [to prison] as a Marxian Socialist and returned as a radical Anarchist." He travelled to the United States in November 1905 and spent until June 1906 in the country.

While in America, he spent most of his time in California, and his ideology further radicalised towards anarcho-communism. He wrote to the anarcho-communist Peter Kropotkin, who gave him permission to translate his works into Japanese in letter dated September 1906. Kōtoku also came into contact with the Industrial Workers of the World, an anarcho-syndicalist union, and became aware of Emma Goldman's anarchist newspaper Mother Earth.

Before he left California, he founded a Social Revolutionary Party amongst Japanese-American immigrants, which quickly radicalised towards the use of terrorist tactics to bring about the anarchist revolution.

=== Return to Japan ===
During his absence, Japanese socialists formed a new Japan Socialist Party in February 1906. Kōtoku's new, more radical ideas clashed with the parliamentary tactics affirmed by the party, and he advocated for anarchist revolution through direct action rather than electoral strategy. The growth of these ideas led to a split in the party between 'soft' and 'hard' factions (parliamentarians and direct actionists respectively), and the party was banned in February 1907. The growth of the pro-direct action faction is considered the beginning of Japan's modern anarchist movement.

Outside of party politics once more, Kōtoku worked with others to translate and publish Kropotkin's anarcho-communist book The Conquest of Bread, alongside an American anarcho-syndicalist pamphlet The Social General Strike. Unions were banned due to a 1900 law, however, and much anarchist discussion was highly theoretical rather than practical. Nevertheless, Kōtoku was strongly critical of Keir Hardie when he visited Japan, decrying "Hardie's State Socialism".

Despite being ideologically opposed to hierarchy, Kōtoku was seen as an 'authority' by many younger anarchists due to Japanese cultural norms, and he himself referred to Kropotkin as sensei (teacher).

== High Treason Incident and execution ==
In 1910, a handful of anarchists, including Kōtoku, were involved in a bomb plot to assassinate the Emperor. The resultant High Treason Incident and trial led to the arrest of hundreds of anarchists, the conviction of 26, and the execution of 12. The trial was rigged by the prosecution, and some of those executed were innocent. The trial and its fallout signalled the start of the 'winter period' (冬時代, fuyu jidai) of Japanese anarchism, in which left-wing organisations were tightly monitored and controlled, and militants and activists were tailed 24 hours a day by police.

Kōtoku was executed by hanging in January 1911 for treason. His final work was Christ Obliterated (基督抹殺論, Kirisuto Massatsuron), which he composed in prison. In this book, he claimed that Jesus was a mythical and unreal figure.

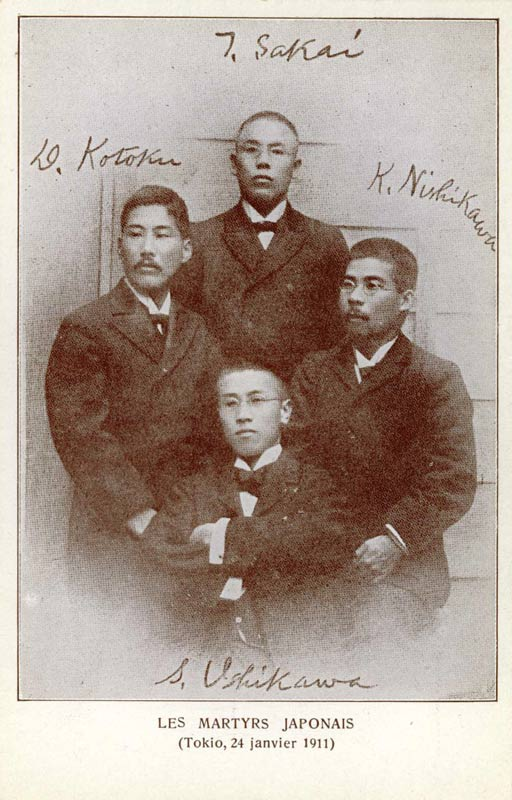
"Les martyrs japonais" (1911). French postcard with the pictures of Denjirō Kōtoku, Toshihiko Sakai, Sanshirō Ishikawa and Kōjiro Nishikawa.

== Personal life ==
Even though he had married a decade prior, he began a love affair with Kanno Sugako after her arrest related to the 1908 Red Flag Incident.

In November 1908, he was diagnosed with tuberculosis, and began to believe that he did not have long to live. This helped to drive him towards supporting more extremist, violent tactics.

== See also ==
- Japanese resistance during the Shōwa period
- Oka Shigeki
