= Sakai Toshihiko =

Japanese socialist

- 堺 利彦
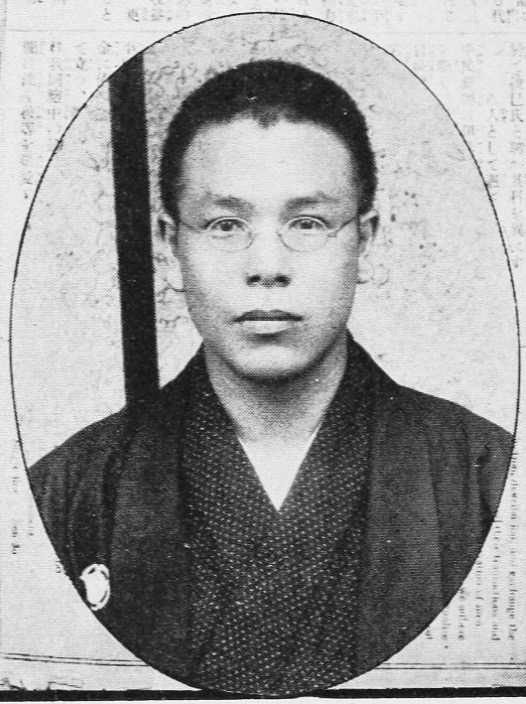
- Sakai Toshihiko
- Born: November 25, 1871; Miyako, Fukuoka, Japan
- Died: January 23, 1933 (aged 61); Tokyo, Japan
- Burial place: Sōjō-ji, Tsurumi-ku, Yokohama
- Other name: Saka Kosen
- Occupations: Journalist, newspaper editor, politician

Sakai Toshihiko (堺 利彦; November 25, 1871 – January 23, 1933) was a Japanese socialist. He advocated opposition to the Russo-Japanese War, founded the Heiminsha and published the newspaper Heimin Shimbun. He formed the Japan Socialist Party and the Japanese Communist Party, and became the first general secretary of the Japanese Communist Party. His pen name is Saka Kosen (堺枯川). He is also known for his translation with Kōtoku Shūsui.

== Biography ==
Sakai was born as the third son to a samurai class family in what is now Miyako, Fukuoka. He attended what is now the Kaisei Academy where he studied the English language. However, he was expelled from the prestigious No.1 Higher Middle School for failure to pay his tuition, and worked as a tutor and a journalist in Fukuoka and Osaka while studying literature on his own, and writing works of fiction. He was invited to Tokyo by Suematsu Kenchō to stay at the residence of the former Mōri clan to help edit a history of the Meiji Restoration.

Afterwards, he went to work for the Yorozu Morning News, where he began to support social justice causes and pacifism.

In 1903, Sakai established the socialist organization Heiminsha, together with Shūsui Kōtoku and Uchimura Kanzō. With the start of the Russo-Japanese War, Yorozu Morning News adopted a pro-government stance, and Sakai quit to form the weekly Heimin Shimbun together with Shūsui Kōtoku, which was critical of the war and decried the high taxes which the war was causing. It also published a Japanese translation of the Communist Manifesto in its November 13, 1904, issue. Sakai was sentenced to two months in jail. Sakai was also a strong supporter of the Esperanto movement, helping create the Japana Esperanto-Instituto in 1906.

In 1906, Sakai became one of the founding members of the Japan Socialist Party. He was arrested in the 1908 Red Flag Incident and was sentenced to two years in prison. Following the end of the First World War he participated in Rousoukai group. In 1922, he became one of the founding members of the Japan Communist Party and was elected to a seat in the Tokyo City Assembly in 1929. Sakai translated many works related to socialism, as well as utopian literature into Japanese. In June 1932, he was admitted to a hospital after an incident of domestic violence under suspicion of insanity, and died of a cerebral hemorrhage on January 23, 1933. His grave is at the temple of Sōji-ji in Tsurumi-ku, Yokohama.

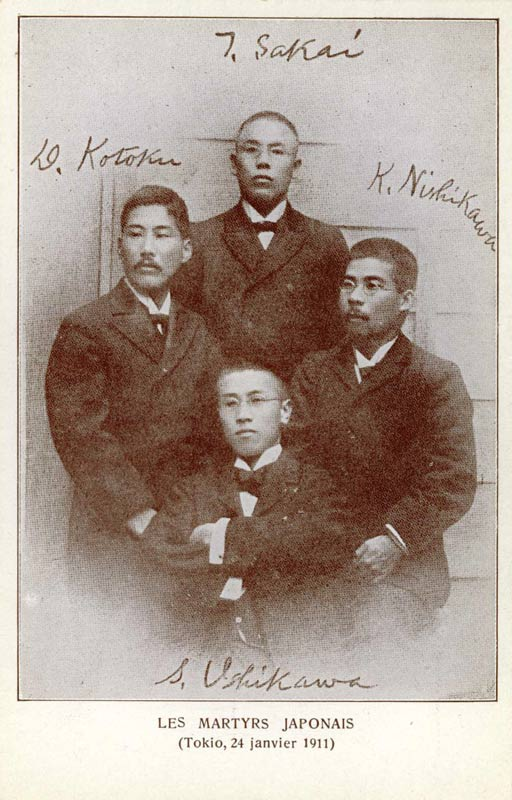
"Les martyrs japonais" (1911) (French postcard with the pictures of Denjirō Kōtoku, Toshihiko Sakai, Sanshirō Ishikawa and Kōjiro Nishikawa.

== See also ==
- Japanese dissidence during the Shōwa period
