= Heimin Shinbun =

Socialist newspaper in Japan (1903–1905)

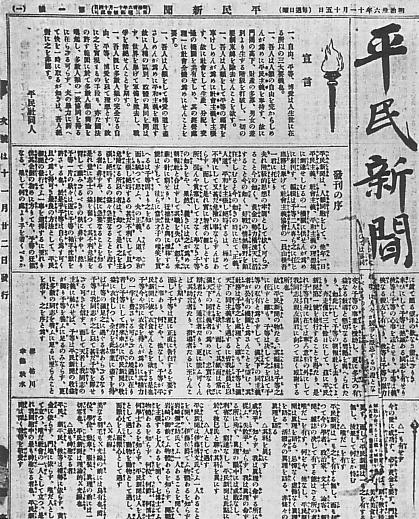
- A clip from Heimin Shinbun, 13 November 1904
- Type: Daily
- Founders: Kōtoku Shūsui; Sakai Toshihiko
- Publisher: Heimin-sha; Japanese Anarchist Federation
- Editor: Kōtoku Shūsui
- Contributor: Uchiyama Gudō
- Founded: November 1903
- Ceased publication: January 18, 1905
- Relaunched: January 1907–April 1907; October 1914–March 1915; June 1946–1950
- Political alignment: Anarchism; Socialism
- Language: Japanese
- City: Tokyo
- Country: Empire of Japan
- Sister newspapers: Ōsaka Heimin Shinbun (later Nihon Heimin Shinbun)

Heimin Shinbun (平民新聞; The Commoner's News, also spelled Heimin Shimbun) was a socialist and anti-war daily newspaper established in Japan in November 1903, as the newspaper of the Heimin-sha group. It was founded by Kōtoku Shūsui and Sakai Toshihiko, as a pacifist response to the approaching Russo-Japanese War. When the newspaper that Kōtoku and fellow socialist Sanshirō Ishikawa had worked for, Yorozu Chūhō, endorsed the war, they resigned in protest to form the group.

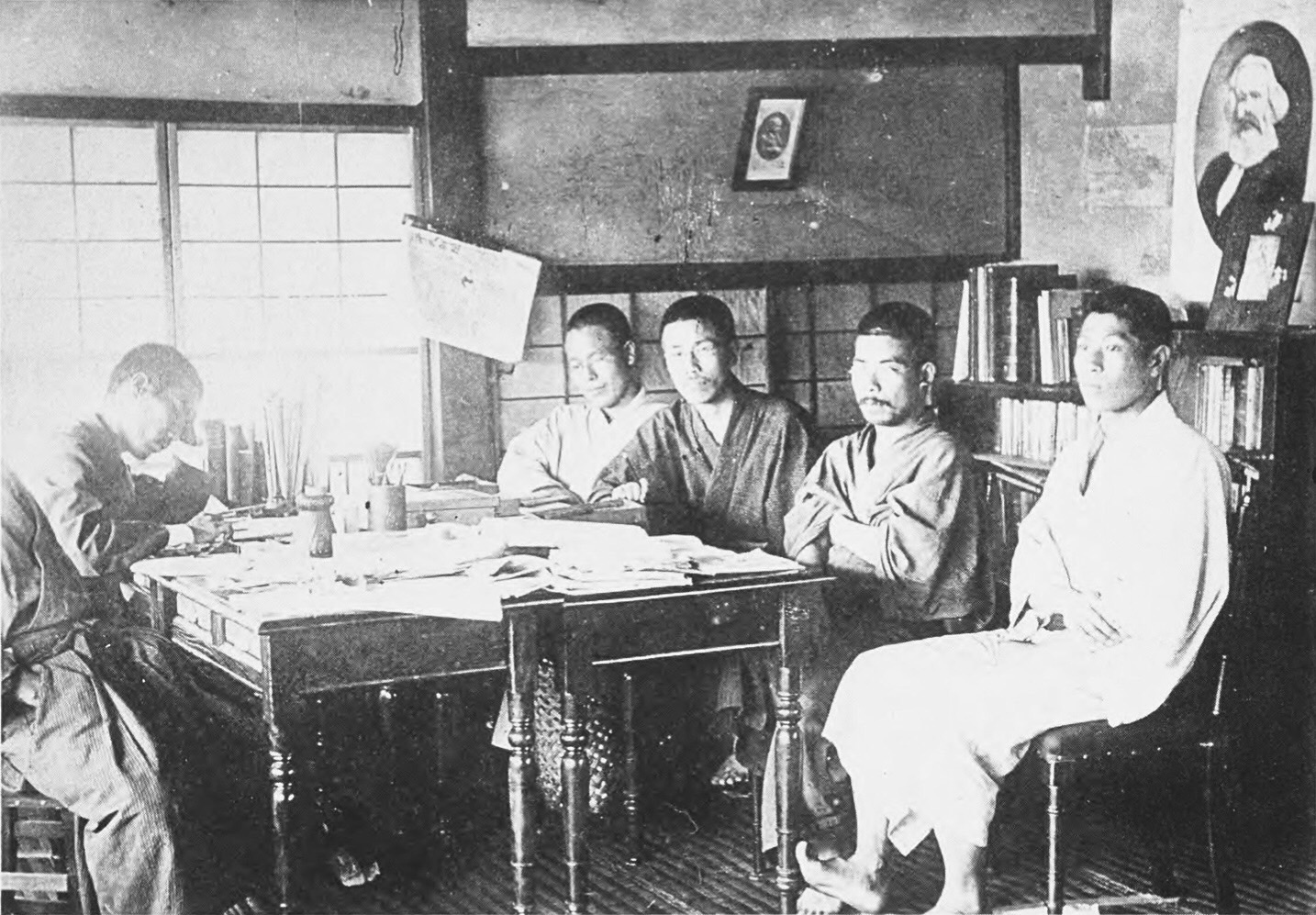
The editing room of Heimin Shinbun. From left to right, Kanzaki Junichi, Kōtoku Shūsui, Sakai Toshihiko, Ishikawa Sanshirō, Nishikawa Kojiro, and Kakiuchi Takejiro

Kōtoku Shūsui also served as one of the paper's editors. By the beginning of 1904, it was Tokyo's leading publication advocating socialism. Eighty-two people eventually expressed their allegiance to socialism in this publication. Multiple issues of the newspaper were banned by the Meiji government because they were deemed politically offensive, and editors were arrested, fined, and jailed. The paper ceased publication in 1905. The last issue, published in red, was printed on 18 January 1905. Kōtoku was imprisoned for five months starting in February 1905 due to his participation in the newspaper.

In January 1907, five socialists, including Kōtoku, Sakai, and Sanshirō, renewed the publication, but it was to fold again in April 1907, after a split between advocates of parliamentary reform and advocates of direct action. It was replaced by two newspapers, one for each faction, including the direct-actionist Ōsaka Heimin Shinbun which was published bi-monthly from June 1907 until May 1908 (renamed in November 1907 to Nihon Heimin Shinbun).

Two anarchist contributors to the initial newspaper, Uchiyama Gudō and Kōtoku Shusui, were later convicted and executed in the 1911 High Treason Incident.

In October 1914, the anarchists Ōsugi Sakae and Arahata Kanson attempted to revive Heimin Shinbun. Most issues of this version of the paper were banned by the government, and it was discontinued in March 1915.

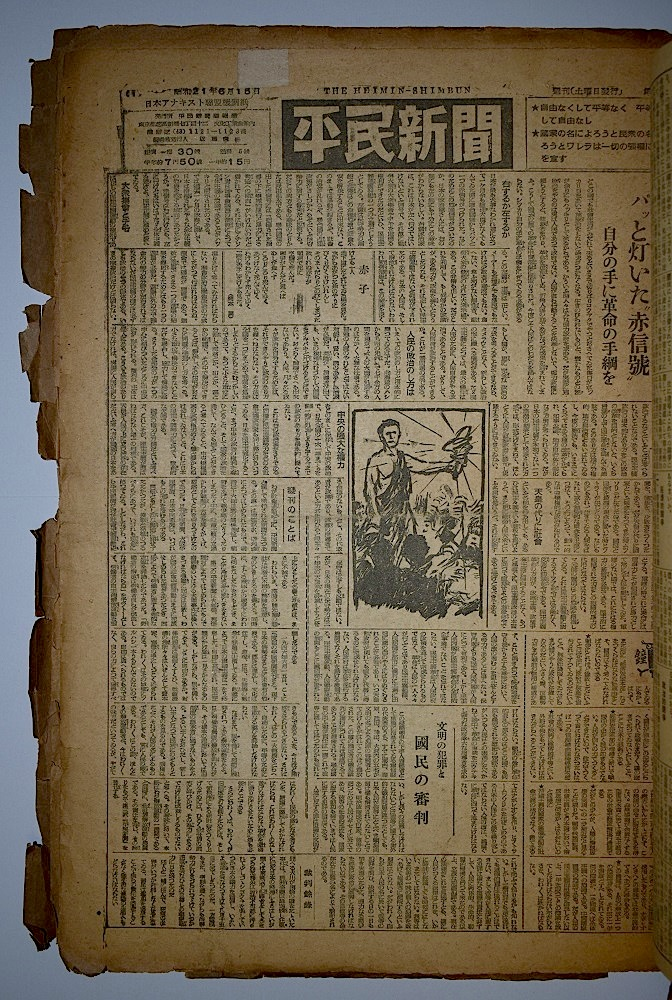
An edition of the post-war iteration of Heimin Shimbun, dated 15 June 1946

After the Second World War, the Japanese Anarchist Federation revived the newspaper in June 1946, but the group collapsed in 1950.

== See also ==
- Shinkigen Monthly
- Japanese dissidence in 20th-century Imperial Japan
- Anarchism in Japan
