= List of members of the Japanese Communist Party =

This list contains the names of members of the Japanese Communist Party (JCP) from its founding in 1922 to the present day.

== A ==
- Kanson Arahata
- Seiken Akamine

== C ==
- Kim Chon-hae

== F ==
- Tetsuzo Fuwa

== H ==
- Kiyoteru Hanada

== I ==
- Shoichi Ichikawa

== K ==
- Sen Katayama
- Hajime Kawakami
- Fukumoto Kazuo
- Takiji Kobayashi
- Akira Koike
- Shigeo Kamiyama

== M ==
- Kenji Miyamoto
- Yuriko Miyamoto née Chūjō

== N ==
- Eitaro Noro
- Sanzo Nosaka

== S ==
- Toshihiko Sakai
- Kamejiro Senaga
- Yoshio Shiga
- Kazuo Shii

== T ==
- Kyuichi Tokuda

== W ==
- Masanosuke Watanabe

== Y ==
- Hitoshi Yamakawa
