= Kamiyama (surname) =

Kamiyama (written: 神山 lit. "god mountain" or 上山 lit. "upper mountain") is a Japanese surname. Notable people with the surname include:

- Hoppy Kamiyama (ホッピー 神山, born 1960), Japanese musician
- Kamiyama Mitsunoshin (上山 満之進, 1869–1938), Japanese Governor-General of Taiwan
- Kenji Kamiyama (神山 健治, born 1966), Japanese anime director
- Kenji Kamiyama (businessman) (上山 健二), Japanese businessman
- Maria Kamiyama (神山 まりあ, born 1987), Japanese model and beauty pageant winner
- Ryuichi Kamiyama (神山 竜一, born 1984), Japanese footballer
- Ryuji Kamiyama (上山 竜司, born 1986), Japanese singer
- Shigeo Kamiyama (神山 茂夫, 1905–1974), Japanese communist
- Takashi Kamiyama (born 1973), Japanese golfer
- Tomohiro Kamiyama (神山 智洋, born 1993), Japanese actor, television personality and idol
