= Tadayoshi Ichida =

Japanese politician

- 市田 忠義
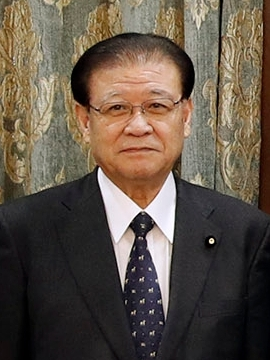
- Ichida in 2018

Secretary General of the Japanese Communist Party
- In office 24 November 2000 – 18 January 2014
- Chairman: Kazuo Shii
- Preceded by: Kazuo Shii
- Succeeded by: Yoshiki Yamashita

Member of the House of Councillors
- In office 26 July 1998 – 25 July 2022
- Constituency: National PR

Personal details
- Born: 28 December 1942 (age 83) Osaka, Japan
- Party: Communist
- Education: Ritsumeikan University
- Website: t-ichida.gr.jp

Tadayoshi Ichida (市田 忠義, Ichida Tadayoshi; born December 28, 1942) is a Japanese politician who served as a member of the House of Councillors for the proportional district from 1998 to 2022. He was the Secretary General of the Japanese Communist Party from 2000 to 2014.

== Biography ==
On December 28, 1942, Tadayoshi Ichida was born in Osaka Prefecture. In 1967, Ichida graduated from Ritsumeikan University. In 1971, he joined the Japanese Communist Party (JCP). In 1994, he was elected to the Standing Executive Committee of the JCP. In 1998, he was elected as a member of the House of Councillors for the proportional district.

In 2000, he was elected Secretary General of the JCP. He was subsequently re-elected as a member of the House of Councillors in 2004 and 2010 for the proportional district. In September 2009, he was appointed head of the JCP's parliamentary group. In 2014, he was transferred from the position of Secretary General to that of Vice Chairman of the JCP. In 2015, he announced that he would not run in the regular election for the 24th House of Councillors in 2016 and would retire at the end of his term. However, the JCP considered Ichida's experience and ability to build ties with opposition parties to be of greater importance, so it decided to nominate him for the proportional representation election for the 24th House of Councillors, and he was successfully re-elected. On November 27, 2021, Ichida announced that he would not run in the summer 2022 election and would retire from politics.
