= List of foreign delegations at the 22nd Japanese Communist Party Congress =

Below is the list of foreign delegations attending the 22nd Congress of the Japanese Communist Party, held between 20 and 24 November 2000.

- the People's Republic of China: Chinese Communist Party
  - Li Yang, Chief Secretary of the International Department of the Chinese Communist Party
  - Lin Li, Director of Japanese Section of Second Asian Bureau
  - Linu Yingchun, First Secretary of the Japanese Section of the Second Asian Bureau
- Cuba: Communist Party of Cuba
  - Hilda Vasallo, Coordinator of Asia in the Department of International Relations
- Czech Republic: Communist Party of Bohemia and Moravia
  - Miloslav Ransdorf, Vice-Chairman
- France: French Communist Party
  - Daniel Cirera, Member of Executive College, Head of the International Relations
- Germany: German Communist Party
  - Hans Stehr, Chairman
- Party of Democratic Socialism
  - Helmut Ettinger, Deputy Head of International Department
- Greece: Communist Party of Greece
  - Naoum Kopsidis, Member of Central Committee, responsible of the Press Bureau
- India: Communist Party of India
  - A.B. Bardhan, General Secretary
- Communist Party of India (Marxist)
  - Harkishan Singh Surjeet, General Secretary
- Italy: Communist Refoundation Party
  - Franco Giordano, Member of the Secretariat, Chairman of the party group in the Chamber of Deputies
- Laos: Lao People's Revolutionary Party
  - Thongsay Bodhisane, Ambassador to Japan
- Mexico: Party of the Democratic Revolution
  - Genoveva Dominguez Rodriguez, Member of the House of Representatives
- Portugal: Portuguese Communist Party
  - Ruben de Carvalho, Member of the Central Committee, responsible for the Avante! Festival
- Russian Federation: Communist Party of the Russian Federation
  - Leonid Ivanchenko, Member of Presidium, Member of Parliament
- South Africa: South African Communist Party
  - Ben Martins, Member of the Central Committee, Member of the National Parliament
- Spain: Communist Party of Spain
  - Javier Navascues, Member of the Secretariat and the Executive Committee, Member of the Federal Directive of the United Left
- Sri Lanka: Communist Party of Sri Lanka
  - Indika Gunawardena, National Organiser, Member of the Political Bureau, Minister of Higher Education and Information Technology Development
- United Kingdom: Communist Party of Britain
  - Kenny Coyle, International Secretariat, Member of Political Committee
- United States: Chris Townsend, individual, trade union activist
- Vietnam: Communist Party of Vietnam
  - Truong Tan Sang, Political Bureau Member, Chief of the Economic Commission
  - Nguyen Huy Quang, Assistants Chief of the External Relations Commission
  - Dong Ngoc Canh, Director of the China-Northeast Asia Division of the External Relations Commission

Associations of foreign residents in Japan:

- Korean Residents Union in Japan
- General Association of Korean Residents in Japan

Moreover, the embassies of Cambodia, Canada, the People's Republic of China, France, Indonesia, Libya, Russian Federation, Tunisia, Uzbekistan, Vietnam and Yugoslavia attended.

Messages to the congress were sent from

- Brazil: Socialist People's Party
- the People's Republic of China: Chinese Communist Party
- Cuba: Communist Party of Cuba
- Denmark: Socialist People's Party
- Germany: German Communist Party
- India: Communist Party of India
- India: Communist Party of India (Marxist)
- Israel: Communist Party of Israel
- Laos: Lao People's Revolutionary Party
- Mexico: Party of the Democratic Revolution
- Russian Federation: Communist Party of the Russian Federation
- Sri Lanka: Communist Party of Sri Lanka
- Sweden: Left Party
- Vietnam: Communist Party of Vietnam
- General Association of Korean Residents in Japan
