= Shōjirō Kasuga =

Japanese communist activist (1903–1976)

Member of the Central Committee, Japanese Communist Party
- In office 1945–1961

Personal details
- Born: March 25, 1903 Osaka, Empire of Japan
- Died: April 9, 1976 (aged 73) Kokubunji Tokyo, Japan
- Party: Japan Communist Party

Shōjirō Kasuga (Japanese: 春日 庄次郎, Kasuga Shōjirō; March 25, 1903 – April 9, 1976) was a Japanese communist activist. He was a member of the Central Committee of the Japan Communist Party (JCP) from 1945 to 1961. In the postwar period, he emerged as the leader of the party's "anti-mainstream" faction that battled with Kenji Miyamoto over party policy.

== Early life ==
Kasuga was born in Osaka on March 25, 1903. After dropping out of Ritsumeikan Junior High School he moved to Tokyo and began working as a printer. In 1923, he founded the Kantō Printers Labor Union. After studying abroad in Moscow, he joined the Japan Communist Party in 1927, only to be arrested in 1928 as part of the March 15 Incident. Sentenced to 10 years in prison, he was released in 1937 without undergoing forced ideological conversion (tenkō). On December 5, he formed the "Japanese Communist Association." He was re-arrested the following year and sentenced to life in prison.

== Postwar activism ==
After Japan's defeat in World War II, Kasuga was released from prison and helped re-form the Japan Communist Party in 1945, becoming a member of the Central Committee. Beginning in the late 1950s, Kasuga became the leader of the JCP's "anti-mainstream" faction that opposed the policies of party leader Kenji Miyamoto. Miyamoto favored closer ties with the People's Republic of China and argued that Japan's transition from feudalism to capitalism was still not complete and therefore what was needed was a “two-stage” revolution—first, a “democratic revolution” that would overthrow American imperialism and establish a capitalist democracy, and only after that a “socialist revolution” that would establish communism. In contrast, Kasuga favored closer relations with the Soviet Union, argued for a slate of internal party reforms he called "Structural Reform" (構造改革, kōzō kaikaku) and insisting that Japan had already achieved capitalism, called for an immediate socialist revolution.

At the JCP's Seventh Party Congress in July 1957, Kasuga's faction controlled as much as 40 percent of the delegates, and was still powerful enough to block many of Miyamoto's policy proposals. However, between the Seventh Party Congress in 1957 and the Eight Party Congress in 1961, Miyamoto was able to dramatically strengthen his hand. In particular, the 1960 Anpo protests attracted many new members to the party, causing party membership to double from 40,000 to 80,000, with many of the new members joining Miyamoto's faction. Meanwhile, Kasuga was distraught at the passive role played by the JCP in the Anpo protests, and the failure of the protests to become a true "socialist revolution," and thus became increasingly strident in his criticism of Miyamoto. On the eve of the Eighth Congress in July 1961, Kasuga and five other prominent members of the anti-mainstream faction issued a scathing denunciation of Miyamoto's proposed party platform and criticized the suppression of minority opinions in composing it, announcing that they were resigning from the party. Thereafter, around 400 other members of the anti-mainstream were either expelled or resigned in protest. Kasuga took many of the militant student activists in the Zengakuren nationwide student federation out of the party with him, and these students founded their own version of Zengakuren known as the "Structural Reform Faction" (Kōkai Ha) Zengakuren.

In May 1962, Kasuga founded a rival communist organization called the Unified Socialist League, with a membership of around 600. Kasuga died of an aortic aneurysm in Kokubunji Central Hospital in Tokyo on April 9, 1976.
