= Unified Socialist League =

The Unified Socialist League (Japanese: 統一社会主義同盟, romanized: Tōitsu Shakaishugi Dōmei, abbreviated Tōshadō) was a pro-Soviet communist organization in Japan, founded on May 3, 1962. The Unified Socialist League was led by Kasuga Shōjirō, formerly a leading figure in the Japanese Communist Party. Makoto Omori was the general secretary of the organization. The organization emerged from a split from the Preparatory Communission for a Socialist Reform Movement (a.k.a. the 'Socialist Renovation' group). The membership of the Unified Socialist League (numbering around 600) was dominated by students, and the organization had a student wing called the Socialist Student Front.

The Unified Socialist League published a monthly journal, Kōzō Kaikaku ('Structural Reform'). It had a circulation of around 2,200. Kōzō Kaikaku was published between May 1962 and December 1963. In May 1964 the Unified Socialist League launched a new publication, Heiwa to Shakaishugi.

The Unified Socialist League repeatedly attacked the Communist Party of Japan, arguing that the party lacked internal democracy and that it was subservient to Chinese interests. The Unified Socialist League did not put forth candidates in national elections.
