= Musansha Shinbun =

Japanese newspaper (1925–1929)

- Type: Newspaper
- Founded: September 1925
- Ceased publication: August 1929
- Political alignment: Communist
- Language: Japanese
- Headquarters: Tokyo
- Country: Japan

Musansha Shinbun (Japanese: 無産者新聞; Proletarian News) was one of the newspapers which were affiliated with the Japanese Communist Party. The paper was in circulation between 1925 and 1929.

== History and profile ==
Musansha Shinbun was launched in Tokyo in 1925. The first issue appeared in September that year and was started as a biweekly publication. The paper published news based on a working class perspective. From January 1926 the frequency of Musansha Shinbun was switched to weekly, and it was later published six times per month. In 1928 its circulation was reported to be 35,000 copies.

Musansha Shinbun was subject to frequent bans during its lifetime. It ceased publication in August 1929 when it was banned. The paper was succeeded by Daini Musansha Shinbun (Japanese: Second Proletarian News).
