= List of foreign delegations at the 21st Japanese Communist Party Congress =

Below is the list of foreign delegations attending the 21st Congress of the Japanese Communist Party, held between 22 and 26 September 1997.

- Cuba: Communist Party of Cuba
  - Alberto Rodriguez Arufe, Vice Chief of Department of International Relations
- El Salvador: Farabundo Martí National Liberation Front:
  - Hector Acevedo Moreno, Secretary for Art and Culture, Vice Secretary for International Relations
- France: French Communist Party
  - Paul Lespagnol, Secretariat Member
- Germany: Party of Democratic Socialism
  - Helmut Scholz, Coordinator of Peace and International Policy Working Group
- India: Communist Party of India
  - A.B. Bardhan, General Secretary
- Communist Party of India (Marxist)
  - Sitaram Yechury, Politburo Member
- Italy: Communist Refoundation Party
  - Claudio Grassi, National Secretariat Member
- Jordan: Jordanian Communist Party
  - Amal Naffa, Politburo Member, Chief Editor of al-Jamahir
- Laos: Lao People's Revolutionary Party
  - Thongsay Bodhisane, Ambassador to Japan
- Mexico: Cardenist Party
  - Teresa Pandura, National Secretary of Finance
  - Guillermo Andrade, Central Committee Member
- Portugal: Portuguese Communist Party
  - Albano Nunes, Secretariat Members, Head of International Department
- Spain: Communist Party of Spain/United Left
  - Angela Sierra González, Member of the European Parliament
- Sweden: Left Party
  - Jonas Sjöstedt, Member of the European Parliament
- United States: Committees of Correspondence for Democracy and Socialism
  - Zachary Robinson, National Executive Committee Member
- Vietnam: Communist Party of Vietnam
  - Pham The Duyet, Political Bureau Member
  - Pham Van Choung, Vice Chairman of the External Relations Commission
  - Doan Ngoc Canh, Head of Department of the External Relations Commission

Moreover, the following guests participated as individuals: John Manning (USA), Ole Korpeitan (Norway), Francisco Nemenzo (Philippines) and Gilma Camargo (Panama).

Messages to the congress were sent from

- Bangladesh: Workers Party of Bangladesh
- Cuba: Communist Party of Cuba
- Cyprus: Progressive Party of Working People
- Czech Republic: Communist Party of Bohemia and Moravia
- El Salvador: Farabundo Martí National Liberation Front
- Germany: German Communist Party
- Greece: Communist Party of Greece
- Hungary: Workers Party
- India: Communist Party of India
- India: Communist Party of India (Marxist)
- Laos: Lao People's Revolutionary Party
- New Zealand: Peace Council of Aotearoa-New Zealand, Inc.
- Philippines: Akbayan
- Philippines: BISIG
- Portugal: Portuguese Communist Party
- Russian Federation: International Association of Scholars for Democracy and Socialism
- Slovakia: Communist Party of Slovakia
- Sri Lanka: Communist Party of Sri Lanka
- Sudan: Sudanese Communist Party
- Switzerland: Swiss Party of Labour
- Vietnam: Communist Party of Vietnam
