= Yoshiki Yamashita =

Japanese politician

- 山下 芳生
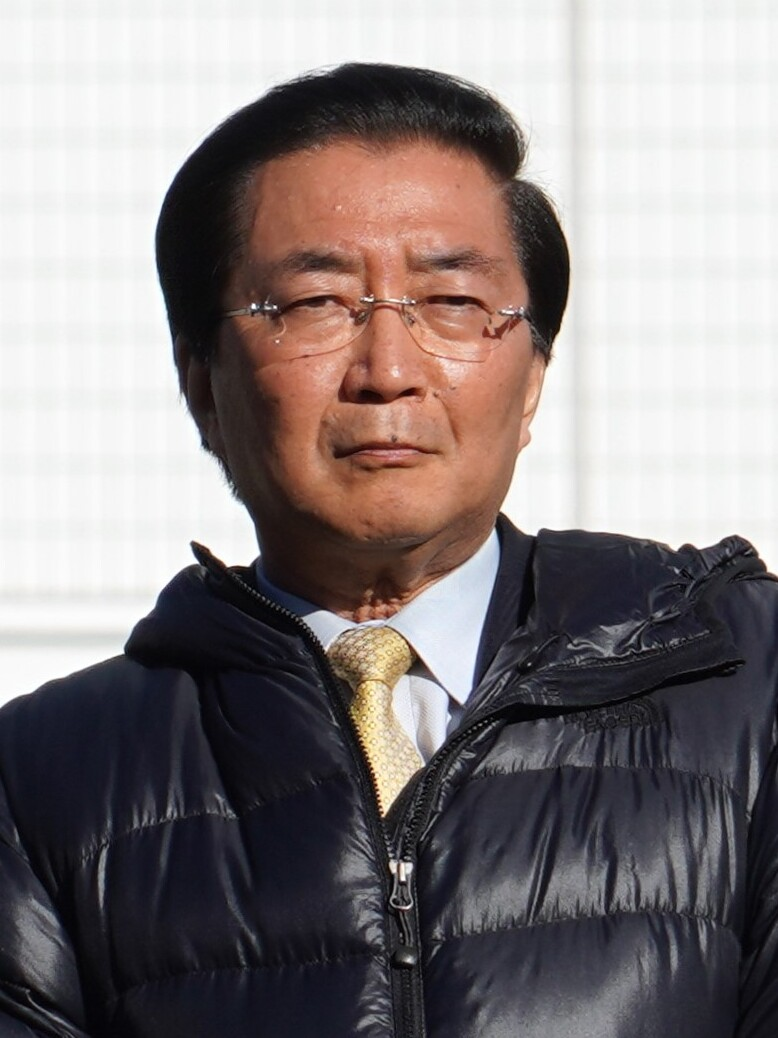
- Yamashita in 2025

Secretary-General of the Japanese Communist Party
- In office 18 January 2014 – 11 April 2016
- Chairman: Kazuo Shii
- Preceded by: Tadayoshi Ichida
- Succeeded by: Akira Koike

Member of the House of Councillors
- In office 30 July 2007 – 28 July 2025
- Constituency: National PR
- In office 23 July 1995 – 22 July 2001
- Preceded by: Knock Yokoyama
- Succeeded by: Takashi Yamamoto
- Constituency: Osaka at-large

Personal details
- Born: 27 February 1960 (age 66) Zentsūji, Kagawa, Japan
- Party: Japanese Communist Party
- Education: Tottori University
- Website: Official website

Yoshiki Yamashita (山下 芳生, Yamashita Yoshiki; born 27 February 1960) is a Japanese politician who served as a member of the House of Councillors in the Diet (national legislature), representing the Japanese Communist Party. A native of Kagawa Prefecture and graduate of Tottori University, he was elected to the House of Councillors for the first time in 1995 after running unsuccessfully in 1992. He lost the seat in the 2001 re-election and then ran unsuccessfully for the House of Representatives in 2003 and 2005. In 2007, he was elected to the House of Councillors for the second time. He is known for his left-wing radicalism.
