= Shoichi Ichikawa =

Shoichi Ichikawa (市川 正一, Ichikawa Shōichi, 20 March 1892 – 15 March 1945) was a Japanese Communist Party member. He was born in Yamaguchi Prefecture on 20 March 1892. He joined the party in January 1923. He was arrested in April 1929. He died in prison in March 1945.

== See also ==
- Japanese dissidence during the Shōwa period
