= Hitoshi Yamakawa =

Japanese socialist (1880–1958)

- 山川 均
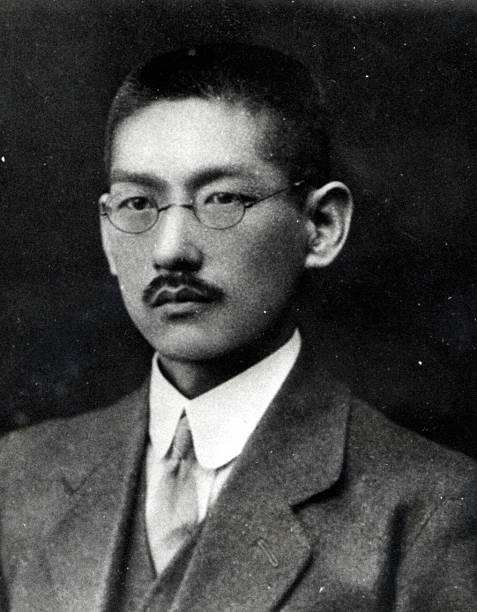
- Born: 20 December 1880; Kurashiki, Okayama, Japan
- Died: 23 March 1958 (aged 77)
- Political party: Japanese Communist Party; Japan Socialist Party
- Movement: Japanese Marxism
- Spouse: Yamakawa Kikue (m. 1916)

Hitoshi Yamakawa (Japanese: 山川 均, Yamakawa Hitoshi; 20 December 1880 – 23 March 1958) was a Japanese socialist intellectual, activist, and theorist. He was a central figure in the early Japanese socialist movement and a co-founder of the first Japanese Communist Party in 1922. After breaking with the party a year later, he became the leader of the Rōnō-ha (Labor-Farmer Faction), a dissident group of Marxist thinkers who challenged the Comintern's thesis that Japan required a two-stage revolution.

Born in Kurashiki into a family that had lost its wealth and status, Yamakawa developed a strong anti-authoritarian streak and a sense of social alienation during his youth. After dropping out of Dōshisha, a Christian school where he was first exposed to socialist ideas, he was imprisoned for lèse-majesté in 1900. This experience proved transformative, and he emerged a dedicated revolutionary.

Yamakawa joined the Japan Socialist Party in 1906 and, under the influence of Kōtoku Shūsui, became a leading advocate of anarcho-syndicalism. Following another prison term after the Red Flag Incident of 1908 and a period of withdrawal, he returned to activism in 1916. The Russian Revolution led him to embrace Leninism, and in 1922 he helped establish the Japanese Communist Party. He developed the doctrine of "Yamakawaism," which called for a mass-based, legal proletarian party rather than a small, secretive vanguard, leading to the dissolution of the first JCP in 1924. In 1927, he led the Rōnō-ha in a definitive split from the JCP, initiating the highly influential "Japanese capitalism debate". Yamakawa and his faction argued that Japan was an advanced capitalist country requiring a direct, one-stage socialist revolution, a position that placed them in direct opposition to both the JCP and the Comintern.

After World War II, he helped establish the Socialist Association (Shakai-shugi Kyōkai (社会主義協会)), which became a powerful left-wing force within the new Japan Socialist Party. He remained a major figure in the socialist movement until his death in 1958.

== Early life and family ==
Hitoshi Yamakawa was born on 20 December 1880 in the town of Kurashiki, Okayama Prefecture, into a family of peasant origin that had achieved wealth and status through the efforts of his grandfather, Yamakawa Kiyosaemon. His grandfather had been a successful official in the Tokugawa intendancy of Kurashiki, serving as Warehouse Superintendent (kuramoto (蔵元)), the most important position a commoner could hold. In contrast, Yamakawa's father, Kōjirō, was a failure who squandered much of the family fortune. Kōjirō, who was adopted into the family, inherited the family headship at fourteen but was unprepared for the responsibility. He adopted what his son later described as a "strict bushidō-like ethical outlook," believing that a concern for money was demeaning. This attitude, derived from samurai ethics and Confucianism, was antithetical to the family's merchant-class background and contributed to his failure in two business ventures: an experimental farm and a yarn shop.

The contrast between his successful grandfather and his failed father, combined with his father's authoritarian and often hypocritical enforcement of a strict moral code, deeply affected young Yamakawa. He developed a "lifetime dislike of authority" and a sense of resentment that he largely suppressed due to the ethic of filial piety. He felt alienated from his family, particularly from his father, who dominated the household but did not seem to measure up to the ideals he professed. Yamakawa felt a deep affection for his overworked mother, whose hardships he attributed to his father's inconsiderate behavior. This family dynamic is seen by his biographer Thomas Swift as a major source of his later belief in social equality, particularly his conviction that women were exploited in traditional marriages. He also inherited his father's rigid ethical code, his distaste for money, and an interest in science and rational inquiry.

Yamakawa entered the public lower elementary school in Kurashiki in 1887. He proved to be a "bright rebel," a precocious student who enjoyed exposing his teachers' mistakes, which earned him low grades in deportment. He was an aloof and lonely child, spending much of his time alone in his workshop or roaming the nearby hills. He was particularly influenced by his seventh and eighth-grade teacher, Mr. Itaya, a progressive educator who encouraged his intellectual interests and love of learning. Inspired by older boys who had gone away to study, Yamakawa decided he wanted to attend middle school in Tokyo, a plan his father opposed due to the family's poor financial state and his desire for his son to take over the failing yarn store. After a heated argument, his father relented and agreed to send him to Dōshisha, a well-regarded Christian school in Kyoto with low tuition.

== Education and political awakening ==
=== Dōshisha years ===
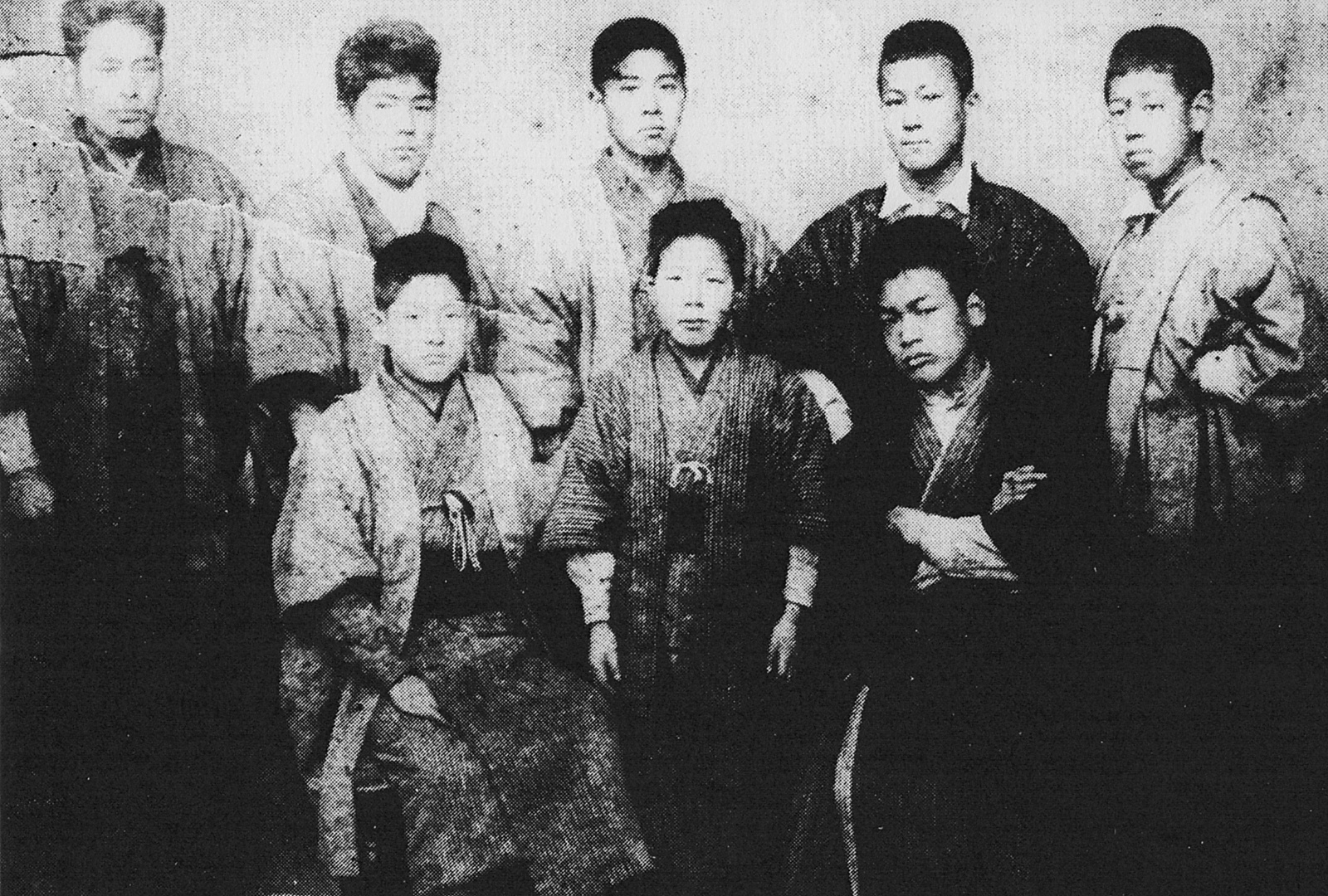
Yamakawa (back row, second from right) c. 1893

Yamakawa began his studies at Dōshisha's preparatory school in 1895. Though initially critical of Christianity as a foreign religion, he was soon attracted to the school's strict moral atmosphere and the self-discipline and kindness of its Christian teachers. He felt a sense of belonging for the first time in his life, finding the small, family-like society of the school appealing. He soon became involved in student life, joining a group of seven students who went sculling on weekends and a rebellious group called the Dōkōkai (闘呼会, Fight Together Society), which led student demonstrations against the school administration.

At Dōshisha, Yamakawa's interest shifted from science to politics and social issues. This was partly because the preparatory school offered few science courses, but primarily due to the widespread concern with such topics among the students. He began to read widely, influenced by the writings of Tokutomi Sohō, whose magazine Kokumin no Tomo (The Nation's Friend) argued that it was the mission of Japan's youth to build a strong, modern nation. Yamakawa was also deeply impressed by Tokutomi's biography of the late-Tokugawa loyalist Yoshida Shōin, admiring Yoshida's patriotic spirit of self-sacrifice. Another major influence was his reading of the Bible. He had no interest in becoming a baptized Christian but saw Jesus as a "reformist... who became a friend of the oppressed, fought against the authorities, and opposed the old order and customs". His interest in Christian social ethics led him to the works of Leo Tolstoy, whose ideas on simple living and non-violence resonated with him, as well as the socialist-adjacent ideas of Henry George and Edward Carpenter.

=== Dropout and alienation ===
In 1897, Dōshisha changed its curriculum to gain official accreditation from the Ministry of Education, introducing courses in physical education and Japanese ethics. Yamakawa and his friends disliked the change, seeing it as a betrayal of the school's tradition of "spiritual education". The ethics course, centered on the Imperial Rescript on Education, particularly troubled him. He could no longer accept the "absurd and illogical" concept of Japan as a divine country ruled by a descendant of the sun goddess. The Rescript's emphasis on unequal hierarchical relationships also conflicted with the Western ethic of equality he had absorbed from Christian teachings. He came to believe that the professor, Dr. Morita, and by extension the Japanese Christian church, were hypocritically trying to serve both God and the Emperor, and his faith in institutional Christianity was shattered.

Yamakawa and other members of the Dōkōkai began a movement against the revised school system. In a gesture of protest, Yamakawa and two others resigned from Dōshisha in the spring of 1897. After succeeding in getting his father's permission to study in Tokyo, he enrolled in a private middle school there but quickly quit, alienated by its impersonal and "amoral" atmosphere. At the age of sixteen, Yamakawa dropped out of school for good. He became almost totally alienated from society, recalling that at this time, "I came to view every thing and everyone as absurd, vulgar, and trifling". His interest in socialism deepened, however, as he learned of the establishment of the first labor unions and socialist study groups in Japan.

== Imprisonment and conversion to socialism ==
In Tokyo, Yamakawa and a small group of other alienated, church-affiliated youths began publishing an eight-page monthly paper called Seinen no Fukuin (青年之福音, The Gospel of Youth) to rally young people against the corruption of society. In the May 1900 issue, Yamakawa and his friend Morita Bunji published articles that implicitly criticized the arranged marriage of Crown Prince Yoshihito (the future Emperor Taishō) to a member of the nobility. The articles hit a sensitive political nerve, as the imperial family was the focus of national loyalty. Two days after the issue went on sale, Yamakawa and Morita were arrested and charged with lèse-majesté. After a secret trial, they were found guilty and sentenced to three and a half years in prison.

The years in prison, from age twenty to twenty-three, were a period of profound transformation for Yamakawa. He later reflected that in prison he was able to "look at myself" and realize he had been an "ignorant and incompetent young man," driven by "vain, sentimental dreams". He developed the self-discipline for serious study and, through conversations with other inmates, came to believe that most crimes were committed for economic reasons. He concluded that a just society could not be achieved merely by changing men's hearts, but required a "change in the economic system". To understand this, he embarked on a systematic study of economics. Using a bookstore catalog, he ordered and read works by John K. Ingram, Alfred Marshall, Adam Smith, David Ricardo, William Thompson, John Stuart Mill, and William Stanley Jevons. According to the jugement of Thomas Swift, the time he was released from prison early for good behavior in July 1904, Yamakawa had acquired "the equivalent of a college education" and had achieved "intellectual and psychological maturity," though he had not yet found a clear direction for his life.

Upon his release, Yamakawa returned to Kurashiki and began studying Karl Marx's Capital and the works of Herbert Spencer. In October 1904, his brother-in-law asked him to manage a new branch of his wholesale drug business in Okayama City. Yamakawa proved to be an energetic and successful manager, and the business grew rapidly. However, he felt deeply ambivalent about his success. He was troubled by his growing love of competition, which conflicted with his childhood belief that business and a concern for profit were distasteful. Gradually, he decided that his life's purpose lay in socialism. In February 1906, he mailed an application for membership to the newly founded Japan Socialist Party (Nihon Shakaitō (日本社会党)).

== Activism and theoretical development ==
=== Anarcho-syndicalist period ===
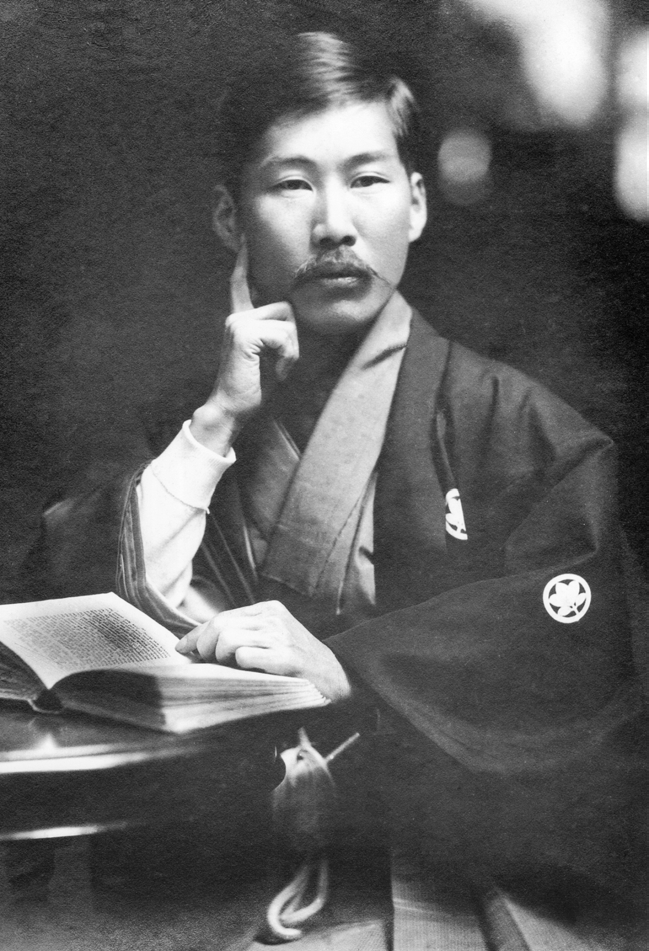
Kōtoku Shūsui, whose anarcho-syndicalist ideas heavily influenced Yamakawa's early activism.

Yamakawa's chance to leave his business career came in October 1906, when he received a letter from the socialist leader Kōtoku Shūsui offering him an editorial position at a daily socialist newspaper, the Heimin Shimbun (Commoners' Newspaper), that was soon to begin publication. He accepted and left for Tokyo in December 1906, over the strong objections of his father.

Yamakawa quickly established himself as a leading theorist for the movement. His earliest articles for the Heimin Shimbun in January 1907 showed his complete conversion to socialism, attacking institutions like arranged marriage as products of a capitalist system that stifled individual freedom. His thought at this time was heavily influenced by Kōtoku Shūsui, who had recently returned from a trip to the United States a committed advocate of anarcho-syndicalism. Kōtoku argued that socialists should abandon parliamentary politics and work to achieve revolution through direct action by the workers, culminating in a general strike. At the Japan Socialist Party's second annual convention in February 1907, a debate broke out between Kōtoku's faction, which advocated for direct action, and a more moderate faction led by Katayama Sen, which favored a parliamentary strategy. Yamakawa sided with Kōtoku. Although he later acknowledged that the parliamentary approach was "more sensible," he was at the time strongly inclined toward Kōtoku's direct action line, which he saw as revolutionary, and despised parliamentarism as reformist. Kōtoku's faction won the vote, and the party adopted a platform stressing a "fundamental change in the present organization of society" and direct action. The government, which had tolerated the party as long as it remained reformist, responded predictably by banning the Japan Socialist Party just days after the convention.

In the months that followed, until the daily Heimin Shimbun folded in April 1907 due to financial difficulties and government indictments, Yamakawa wrote a series of articles elaborating on the anarcho-syndicalist platform. He argued that strikes were the most effective weapon for workers to develop class consciousness and ultimately overthrow the capitalist state. He also continued his study of European socialist thought. He translated and published a pamphlet by the Russian anarchist Peter Kropotkin and wrote a long article on Marx's Capital that, for the first time, established a clear and accurate Japanese vocabulary for Marxist economic terms, such as "surplus value" (jōyo kachi (剰余価値)) and "commodity" (shōhin (商品)).

The socialist movement, now without a party or a daily newspaper, soon descended into bitter factional strife between the direct action advocates and the parliamentarists. In June 1908, the government struck a heavy blow against the movement. At a party celebrating the release of an imprisoned socialist, young radicals unfurled red flags bearing the words "Anarchist Communism" and "Revolution". A fight ensued with the police who arrived to suppress the display. In the aftermath, known as the Red Flag Incident, fifteen leading socialists were arrested, including Yamakawa. He was sentenced to two years in prison as one of the assumed leaders of the fracas. This event led to the fall of the cabinet and its replacement by a more repressive one, which two years later would use a fabricated plot to execute Kōtoku Shūsui and other socialists in the High Treason Incident of 1910. While in prison, Yamakawa grew disillusioned with the movement, wondering if their activities were merely a form of "self-amusement". After his release in 1910, he returned to Okayama, established a drug store, and temporarily withdrew from political activism.

=== "Yamakawaism" and the Communist Party ===
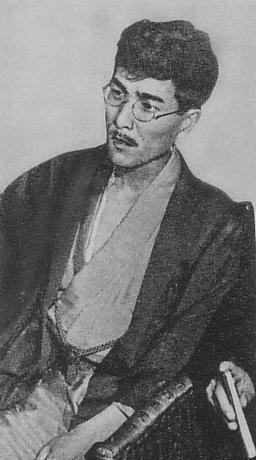
Hitoshi Yamakawa

Yamakawa's withdrawal from the socialist movement was temporary. He returned to the "reviving movement in 1916" and soon became a foremost leader of its "important left wing". In the aftermath of the Russian Revolution, he, like many on the Japanese left, turned from anarchism to Leninism. In 1922, Yamakawa co-founded the first Japan Communist Party (JCP). That same year, he developed the strategic doctrine that came to be known as "Yamakawaism". In his August 1922 essay "A change of direction in the proletarian movement," he called for a "massification" (taishū-ka (大衆化)) of the new party. Responding to the Comintern's "To the masses!" slogan, Yamakawa argued that the revolutionary movement needed to be broad-based and rooted in the day-to-day concerns of the working class. He advocated for a single, legal proletarian party that could unite all workers and peasants, rather than a small, secretive vanguard of intellectuals. His ideas were criticized by some as "Japanese-style legalism," but his influence was decisive, and in 1924 he led the move to dissolve the first, illegal JCP.

Yamakawa's approach soon came into conflict with the opposing doctrine of Fukumotoism. Fukumoto Kazuo, a committed Leninist, argued for a small, ideologically pure vanguard party that would maintain a strict separation from other progressive movements. By 1926, Fukumoto's more orthodox Leninist position had gained widespread support, and when the JCP was re-established in December of that year, Fukumotoism became the dominant ideology.

== Japanese capitalism debate and the Rōnō-ha ==
In 1927, the Comintern intervened directly in the Japanese movement, issuing its "1927 Theses" which repudiated both Yamakawa's "dissolutionism" and Fukumoto's "sectarianism". The theses called for a two-stage revolution, arguing that Japan, as a "semi-feudal" state, first needed to complete a bourgeois-democratic revolution before it could proceed to a socialist one. Yamakawa and his followers rejected this analysis. In November 1927, they formally broke with the JCP and in December launched the journal Rōnō (労農, Labor-Farmer), from which their faction, the Rōnō-ha, took its name. This event marked the beginning of the highly influential Japanese capitalism debate between the Rōnō-ha and the JCP-aligned Kōza-ha (Symposium Faction).

The central disagreement concerned the nature of the Meiji Restoration and the character of the contemporary Japanese state. The Rōnō-ha, led by Yamakawa, argued that the Meiji Restoration had been a successful bourgeois revolution that had swept away the old feudal order. They saw contemporary Japan as an advanced capitalist country, not a semi-feudal one. Consequently, they argued for a direct, one-stage socialist revolution, believing that the task of a bourgeois-democratic revolution had already been accomplished. In their view, the emperor system was merely a remnant of the past, a "bourgeois monarchy" similar to that in Great Britain, and not a central obstacle to revolution. The Rōnō-ha used an "instrumentalist" approach to the state, seeing it as a tool of the dominant capitalist class. Their analysis emphasized the universal characteristics of Japan's development, aligning it with the Western European model of transition from feudalism to capitalism. Their strategy called for a single, mass-based proletarian party to lead the revolution, a continuation of the ideas of Yamakawaism. The Rōnō-ha thus represented an attempt to create an indigenous Japanese Marxism, independent of the ideological authority of the Soviet-led Comintern.

Yamakawa withdrew from active politics in 1931, but was nevertheless thrown in prison during the Popular Front Incident in 1937 when the government was clamping down on dissent after invading China. He spent the war years in prison.

== Later career and legacy ==
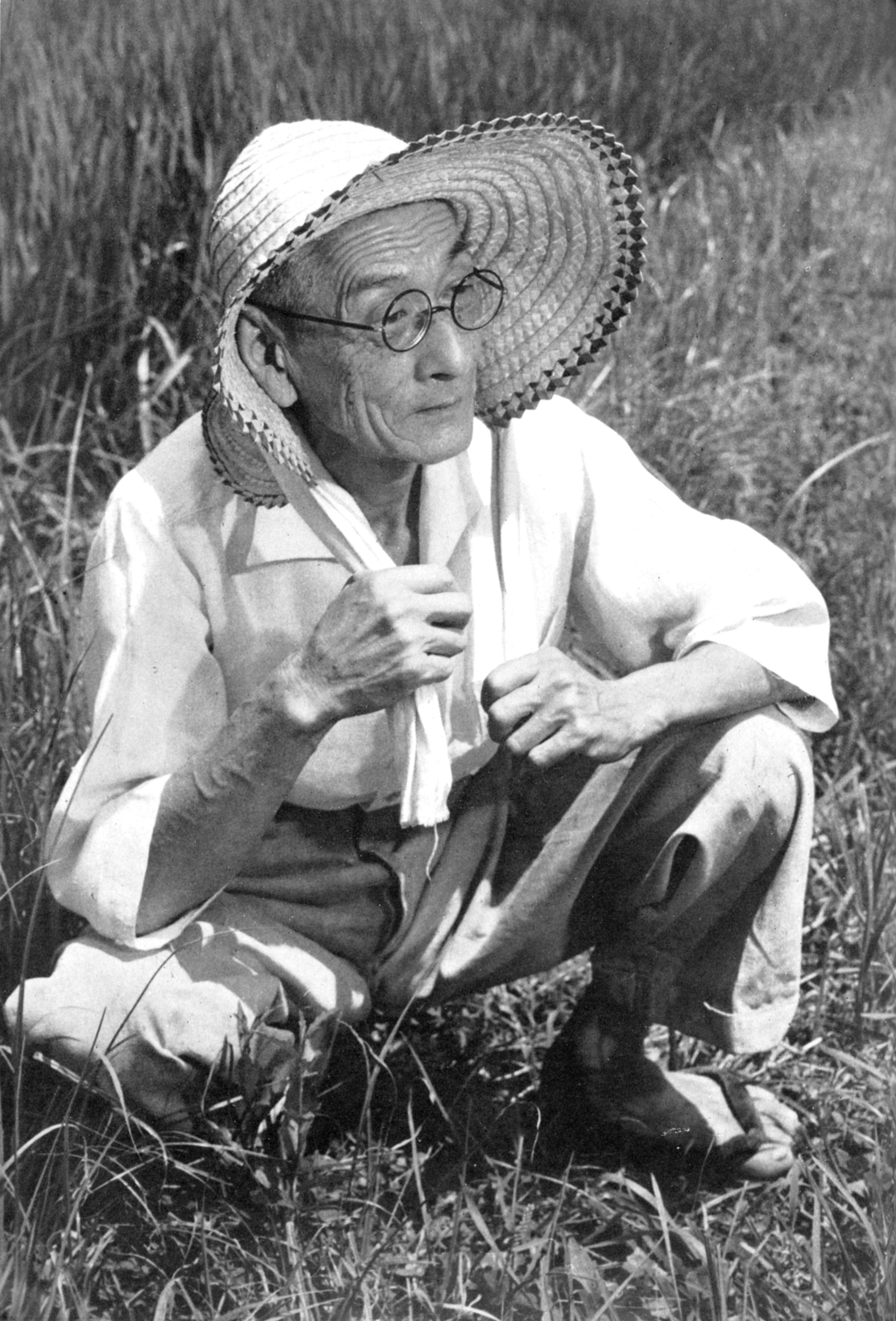
Yamakawa in 1949

After World War II, Yamakawa remained an influential figure in the Japanese socialist movement. In 1951, one year after the newly formed Japan Socialist Party (JSP) split, Yamakawa and the Marxist economist Ōuchi Hyōei founded the Socialist Association (Shakai-shugi Kyōkai (社会主義協会)), a group of left-wing socialist intellectuals around the Left Socialist Party. After the party reunited in 1955, the Kyōkai became a powerful faction within the left of the JSP, pushing it toward a more Marxist orientation. Under Yamakawa's leadership, the Kyōkai advocated for a policy of "unarmed neutrality" for Japan in the Cold War and for "polycentrism" in the international communist movement, a position that asserted the independence of national parties from the Soviet Union's leadership.

Yamakawa died of cancer in 1958. He was married to the outspoken feminist Yamakawa Kikue.
