= Fukumoto Kazuo =

- 福本 和夫
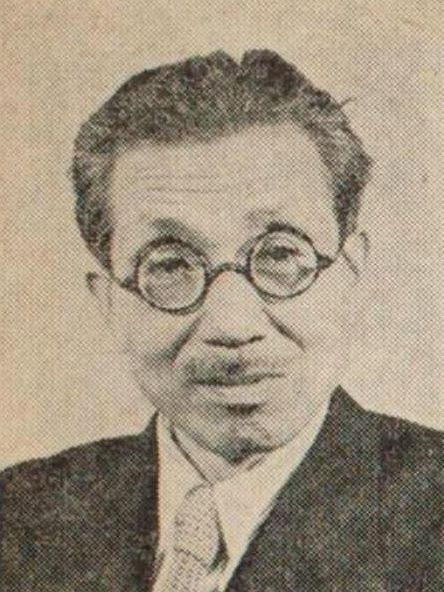
- Born: July 4, 1894; Tottori, Japan
- Died: November 16, 1983 (aged 89)
- Education: Tokyo Imperial University
- Political party: Japanese Communist Party
- Movement: Japanese Marxism

Fukumoto Kazuo (Japanese: 福本 和夫, Hepburn: Fukumoto Kazuo; 4 July 1894 – 16 November 1983) was a Japanese Marxist and one of the most important theoreticians of the Japanese Communist Party during the 1920s.

== Biography ==
Fukumoto was born in Tottori Prefecture to a moderately prosperous landowning family. He studied law at Tokyo Imperial University and became a lecturer at a high school after graduation. In 1922 he was sent to Europe to study law; there he familiarized himself with Marxism and joined the Communist Party of Germany. When he returned home in 1924 he joined a small communist group and became an editor for a small magazine simply called Marxism.

Fukumoto wrote numerous articles and was well known in left-wing circles for his interpretations of Marxism-Leninism and his criticism of other Japanese Marxist scholars, especially Yamakawa Hitoshi and Kawakami Hajime. His writing style was considered complex and he was more interested in the theoretical than the practical aspects of Socialism. Fukumoto called for the separation of true Marxist from false Marxists and urged the true Marxists to concentrate on theoretical struggle. This approach was popular among young intellectuals and was called Fukumotoism, as opposed to the more pragmatic mass-based approach of Yamakawa called Yamakawaism.

Fukumoto's main contribution was to improve the theoretical foundation of the communist party and the revolution, though he also expressed the idea that excessive focus on theory could isolate the party from other left-wing groups. Eventually the Comintern took the view that this was happening and in 1927 it issued a thesis attacking both Yamakawa and Fukumoto and demanding that the party strive for an immediate two-stage revolution to overthrow the Japanese government, and especially the Emperor system and Diet of Japan, redistribution of wealth, and pursue a favourable policy with the USSR.

In the 1950 Japanese House of Councillors election Fukumoto stood as the candidate for the Japanese Communist Party in the Tottori constituency.

Later in life he dedicated himself to researching agricultural issues and the history of the Japanese Renaissance.
