= Akira Koike =

Japanese politician and physician

- 小池 晃
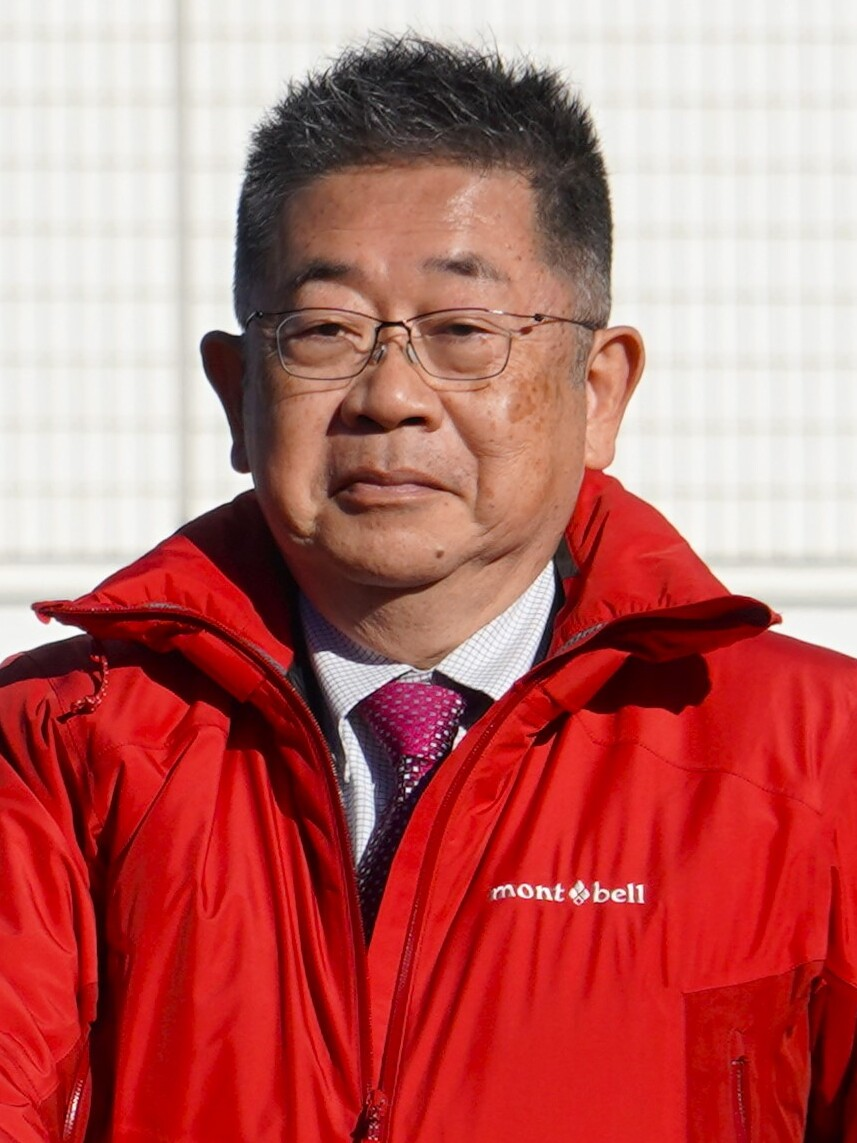
- Koike in 2025

Secretary-General of the Japanese Communist Party
- Incumbent
- Assumed office 11 April 2016
- Chairperson: Kazuo Shii; Tomoko Tamura
- Preceded by: Yoshiki Yamashita

Member of the House of Councillors
- Incumbent
- Assumed office 29 July 2013
- Constituency: National PR
- In office 26 July 1998 – 25 July 2010
- Constituency: National PR

Personal details
- Born: 9 June 1960 (age 66) Setagaya, Tokyo, Japan
- Party: Communist
- Education: Tohoku University
- Website: www.a-koike.gr.jp

Akira Koike (小池 晃, Koike Akira; born 9 June 1960) is a Japanese politician and physician who is the secretary-general and vice chair of the Japanese Communist Party. He also serves as a member of the House of Councillors for the party.

== Early life ==
Akira was born on 6 June 1960 in Setagaya, Tokyo. He attended Ōnoden Elementary School, Shiritsu Daiyon Junior High School, and Senior High School at Komaba, University of Tsukuba. He graduated from the Tohoku University School of Medicine in March 1987.
