= Eitaro Noro =

Japanese economist (1900–1934)

- 野呂榮太郎
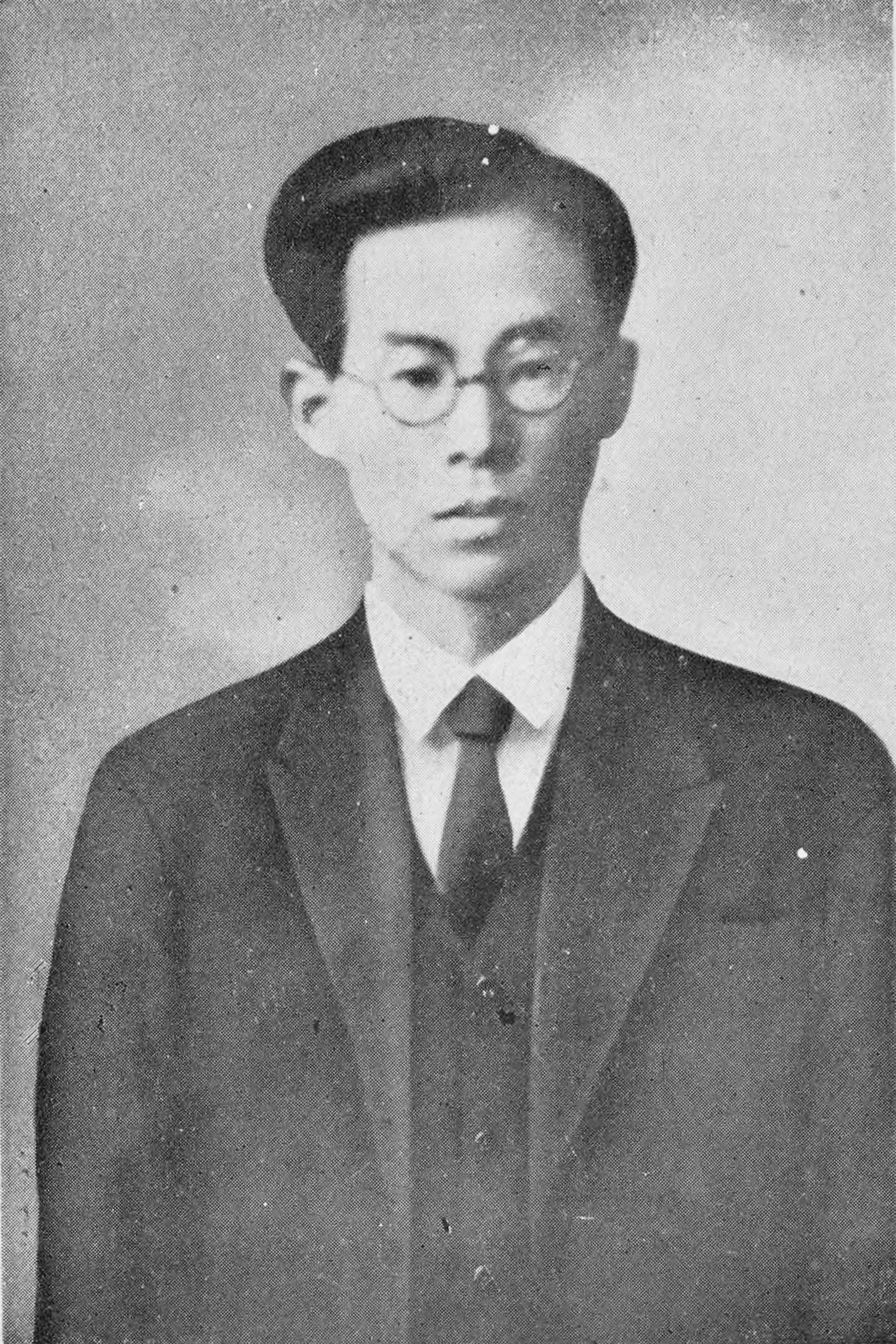
- Died: 19 February 1934 (aged 33); Tokyo
- Known for: Marxism, Japanese Capitalism

Academic background
- Thesis: The historical development of Japanese capitalism (1926)

Academic work
- Discipline: Political science
- Sub-discipline: Japanese economics
- Institutions: Industrial Labour Research Institute

Eitaro Noro (野呂 榮太郎, Noro Eitarō; 1900–1934) was a Japanese economic historian. Noro was born in Hokkaido in 1900. He studied at Keio Gijuku University, where he first became involved in radical politics. He worked for a labour research institute following graduation. In 1930 he joined the Japanese Communist Party. He was instrumental in laying the foundations for the Koza school, a branch of Japanese Marxist thought.

Noro was arrested in November 1933. He died on 19 February 1934, in Shinagawa Police Station. His death was the result of police torture.

== Works ==
- Nihon Shihonshugi Hattatsushi (History of the Development of Japanese Capitalism) (1930)

== See also ==
- Japanese dissidence during the Shōwa period
