= Japanese Communist Party =

Japanese political party

Japanese Communist Party 日本共産党 Nihon Kyōsan-tō
- Abbreviation: JCP
- Chairperson: Tomoko Tamura
- Secretary-General: Akira Koike
- Founded: 15 July 1922 (104 years, 130 days)
- Headquarters: 4-26-7 Sendagaya, Shibuya, 151-8586 Japan
- Newspaper: Shimbun Akahata
- Youth wing: Democratic Youth League of Japan
- Membership (January 2024): ▼250,000
- Ideology: Communism; Democratic socialism
- Political position: Left-wing to far-left
- International affiliation: IMCWP
- Colors: Red (official); Strong pink (customary)
- Senators: 7 / 248 (3%)
- Representatives: 4 / 465 (0.9%)
- Prefectural assembly members: 109 / 2,614 (4%)
- Municipal assembly members: 2,173 / 28,940 (8%)

Election symbol

Party flag

Website
- www.jcp.or.jp (Japanese); www.jcp.or.jp/english (English)

The Japanese Communist Party (日本共産党, Nihon Kyōsan-tō; abbr. JCP) is a major political party in Japan. Founded in 1922, it is the oldest active political party in the country. It had 250,000 members as of January 2024, making it one of the largest non-governing communist parties in the world. The party is chaired by Tomoko Tamura, who replaced longtime leader Kazuo Shii in January 2024.

The JCP, founded in 1922 in consultation with the Comintern, was deemed illegal in 1925 and repressed for the next 20 years, while continuing its activities underground. After World War II, the party was legalized in 1945 by the Allied occupation authorities, but its unexpected success in the 1949 Japanese general election led to the "Red Purge", in which tens of thousands of actual and suspected communists, along with their sympathizers, were fired from their jobs in government, education, and industry. The Soviet Union encouraged the JCP to respond with a violent revolution, and the resulting internal debate fractured the party into several factions. The dominant faction, backed by the Soviets, waged an unsuccessful guerrilla campaign (Mountain Village Operation Units) in rural areas, which undercut the party's public support.

In 1958, Kenji Miyamoto became the JCP's leader and moderated the party's policies, abandoning the previous line of violent revolution and extremism. Miyamoto also began distancing the JCP from the Eastern Bloc in the 1960s. The party maintained a neutral position during the Sino-Soviet split and expressed its support for a multi-party system of liberal democracy in contrast to the authoritarian one-party systems of Communist-led nations such as the People's Republic of China and the Soviet Union. Measures were also undertaken to expel members who were aligned with either pro-Soviet or pro-China positions. His efforts to regain electoral support were particularly successful in the main urban areas such as Osaka, Kyoto, and Tokyo, and the JCP worked with the Japan Socialist Party (JSP) in the 1970s to elect a number of progressive mayors and governors. By 1979, the JCP held about 10% of the seats in the National Diet. The party saw a brief electoral resurgence after the collapse of the JSP in 1996; however, the party has generally been in decline since in terms of electoral results and party membership.

The party at present advocates the establishment of a democratic society based on pacificism. It believes that this objective can be achieved by working within an electoral framework while carrying out an extra-parliamentary struggle against "imperialism and its subordinate ally, monopoly capital". As such, the JCP does not advocate violent revolution, but rather a "democratic revolution" to achieve "democratic change in politics and the economy". It accepts the constitutional position of the Emperor of Japan but opposes the involvement of the Imperial House in politics. A staunchly anti-militarist party, the JCP firmly supports Article 9 of the Japanese Constitution and seeks to dissolve the Japan Self-Defense Forces. It opposes Japan's military alliance with the United States as an unequal relationship and infringement of Japan's national sovereignty.

== History ==
=== Foundation ===
Sanzō Nosaka became a communist in the late 1910s and was a founding member of the Communist Party of Great Britain. Sen Katayama left Japan for the United States in 1914, after serving a prison sentence for supporting a strike. He became a communist during his time in the country and was a founding member of the Communist Party USA (CPUSA). Katayama founded the Association of Japanese Socialists in America and served as chair of the Far Eastern People's Congress.

In 1921, Katayama was informed by the Communist International (Comintern) that the First Congress of the Toiler of the Far East would be held on 21 January 1922 in Irkutsk. Three men from his organization (Watanabe Haruo, Taguchi Unzo, and Maniwa Suekichi) served as delegates. The Japanese Communist Party was founded in Tokyo on 15 July 1922, at a meeting where Kyuichi Tokuda discussed sessions held between the Japanese delegation and Comintern officials. Two delegates were sent to the 4th World Congress of the Communist International and a general meeting of the party was held in Ichikawa, Chiba, on 4 February 1923.

The party's early leadership was drawn from the anarcho-syndicalist and Christian socialist movements that developed around the turn of the century. From the former came Hitoshi Yamakawa, Sakai Toshihiko, and Kanson Arahata, who had all been supporters of Kōtoku Shūsui, an anarchist executed in 1911. Katayama, another early party leader, had been a Christian socialist for much of his political life. The three former anarchists were reluctant to found the JCP, with Yamakawa shortly after arguing that Japan was not ready for a communist party and calling for work to be done solely within labor unions. Katayama's theoretical understanding of Marxism was also alleged to remain low.

=== Outlawed and persecuted ===
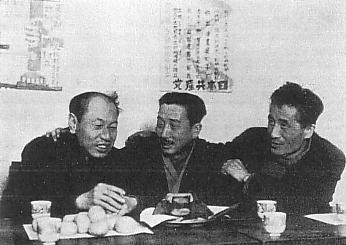
Prominent wartime JCP members from left to right: Kyuichi Tokuda, Sanzō Nosaka and Yoshio Shiga, c. 1945–1946

In May 1923, a roster of the JCP's membership was found by police at Manabu Sano's quarters at Waseda University. A series of protests were occurring at the university about military training. On 5 June, almost every member of the party, except those in rural areas or outside the country, were arrested. The Japanese government used the 1923 Great Kantō earthquake as an excuse to crack down on suspected enemies of the state and murdered socialists, anarchists, communists, and labor officials. Ōsugi was murdered in his prison cell.

A group of Japanese communists, including Arahata, assembled in Vladivostok in August, and decided to create a proletarian party. Those members arrested in 1923, and released in 1924, believed that the conditions for a communist party were not present and decided to dissolve the party at the Morigasaki Conference in March. However, Grigori Voitinsky rejected this and ordered them to reestablish the party. In August, a committee with Tokuda as chair was formed to reestablish the party. Masanosuke Watanabe and Manabu Sano held positions in this committee and Arahata was an organizer in the Kansai region. The JCP was formally reestablished on 4 December 1926. Fukumoto Kazuo, a rising figure in Japanese communism, was a member and his ideology, Fukumotoism, was a main part of the platform.

When the JCP was outlawed in 1925 with the passage of the Peace Preservation Law, the JCP was subjected to repression and persecution by the Special Higher Police (Tokkō), nicknamed the "Thought Police". JCP members and sympathizers were imprisoned and pressured to "convert" (tenkō suru) to anti-communist nationalism. Many of those who refused to convert remained imprisoned for the duration of the Pacific War. The Japanese Communist Party member Hotsumi Ozaki, who was part of the Richard Sorge spy ring for the Kremlin, was the only Japanese person hanged for treason under the Peace Preservation Law. Police also commonly used methods of torture against arrested communists. One of the JCP members killed by police torture in this period was the writer Kobayashi Takiji. Female activists were sometimes subjected to sexualised forms of abuse later referred to as erotero (erotic terror). A documented case is that of Yukika Asanuma (later Seno), a cousin of Inejirō Asanuma, who in 1929, while still a teenager and a party member, was arrested by the Special Higher Police and later described prolonged sexual humiliation and assault during interrogation; she resumed underground activity after release and was arrested repeatedly before 1945.

Hyōgikai was formed on 25 May 1925, and this union served as a vehicle for the communist party. Other proletariat parties (Japan Farmers Party, Japan Labour-Farmer Party, Social Democratic Party, and Labour-Farmer Party) were formed during this period. Ikuo Oyama, the leader of the Labour-Farmer Party, was sympathetic to the Communists. These parties won several seats in the 1928 election, but a crackdown on 15 March resulted in 1,200 people, including Communist leaders, being arrested and the Japanese government dissolved Hyōgikai and Labour-Farmer Party. Manabu Sano, Masanosuke Watanabe, Shoichi Ichikawa, Kenzō Yamamoto, and Hideo Namba avoided arrest as they were serving as representatives to the 6th World Congress of the Communist International and reorganized the party. The Labour-Farmer Party was reconstituted, with opposition from the Comintern-affiliated communists, into the Proletarian Masses Party with Mosaburō Suzuki as Secretary General. Masanosuke Watanabe, the chair of the party, committed suicide on 6 October 1928, after being arrested. An attempt to reform Hyōgikai resulted in more arrests, so a new organization, the National Council of Japanese Labor Unions (Zenkyō), was formed as an underground group with 5,500 members on 25 December.

Police found a chart of the JCP's district organization in Tokyo after arresting a prominent member on 18 March 1929. Shoichi Ichikawa was arrested on 28 April, Mitamura Shiro and Nabeyama Sadachika on 28 April, and Manabu Sano avoided arrest until his apprehension in Shanghai on 16 June 1929. Kenzo Yamamoto, who was sick in Moscow, was one of the few leaders not imprisoned. 81 high-ranking members of Zenkyō were arrested in April. The party was reconstituted by Seigen Tanaka, Zenshirō Zennō, and Sano Hiroshi in July. Many members wanted to dissolve the party as the Peace Preservation Law was amended to inflict the death penalty. A police raid led by a former wrestler arrested most of Seigen Tanaka's subordinates on 14 July 1930, and he was arrested later that same day. Kenzō Yamamoto was executed by the Soviets in 1939, after Sanzō Nosaka accused him of spying; Yamamoto's death was reported as 1942, and the truth about his death was not revealed until 1992.

In 1932, Japanese authorities raided a meeting of members of the Japanese Communist Party in Atami. According to a March 1933 article on the raid, the accused were not the "rag-tag-and-bobtail" of the people. Only a very small minority of the accused were laborers. Almost all the accused were of the "better classes". Among the accused were two judges, two professors of universities, lawyers, teachers, and students. Professor S.H Roberts of the University of Sydney reported in a 1934 newspaper that "all Japan was stirred when it was realized that only a minority of prisoners were laborers." In addition, the arrested were also accused of being connected to the Omori Bank Robbery.

Jōkichi Kazama was sent from Moscow to rebuild the party in December 1930. He and Noboru Matsumura wrote the 1931 Draft Thesis, but the Comintern was displeased with it. A new document supported by the Comintern, the 1932 Draft Thesis, was written by Nosaka and served as the JCP's main document until 1946. This document stated that a bourgeois revolution to eliminate feudalism and the emperor must occur before the proletariat revolution. Kazama and other leaders were arrested in fall 1932. The party was reformed by Masami Yamamoto, who was also sent from Moscow, in January 1933, but he was arrested on 3 May. Manabu Sano, Kazama, Tanaka, and other imprisoned Communist leaders denounced communism starting in May. The leadership of the party's central committee passed from Eitaro Noro to Kenji Miyamoto to Hakamada Satomi as a result of each person's arrests. The party lost its organization after Hakamada Satomi's arrested on 3 March 1935. Shōjirō Kasuga, who was arrested in 1928 and released in 1937, attempted to reform the party after he was released, but he and 157 members were arrested in 1938.

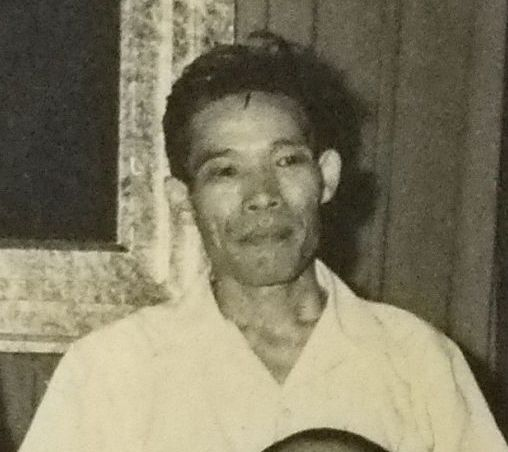
Shōichi Kasuga

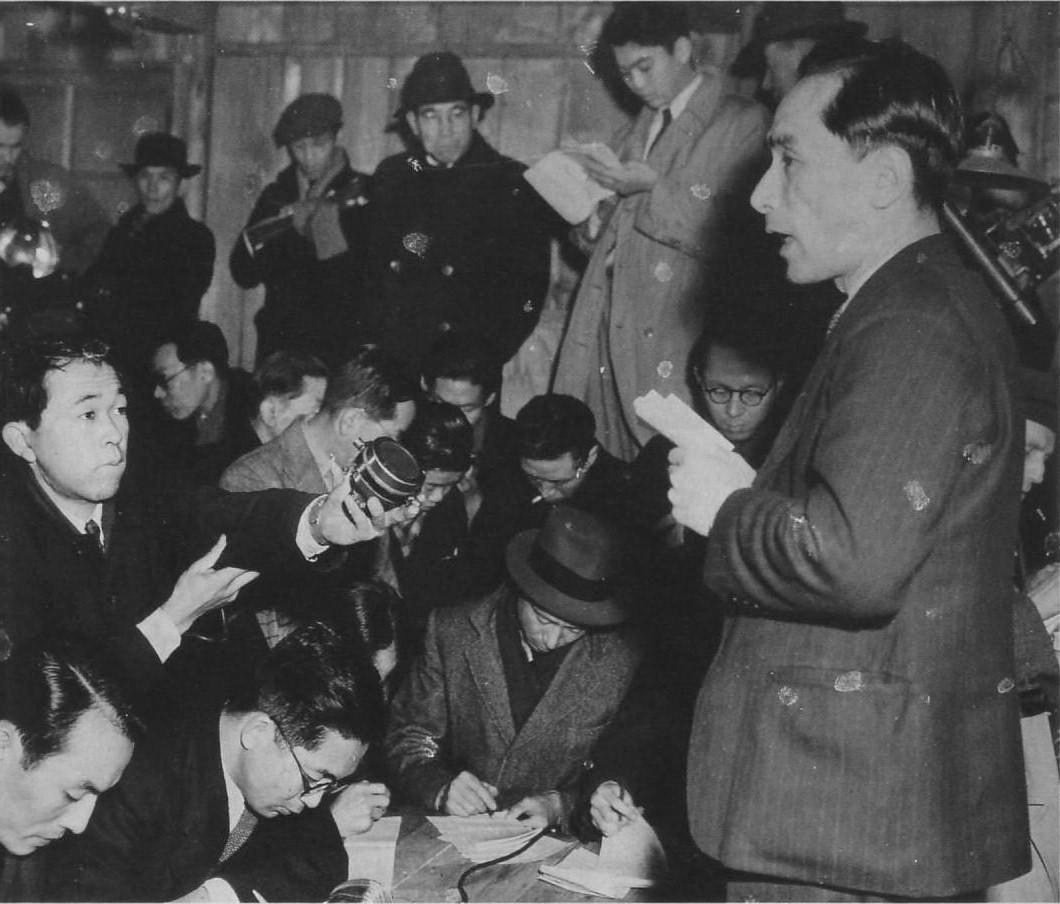
Ritsu Ito

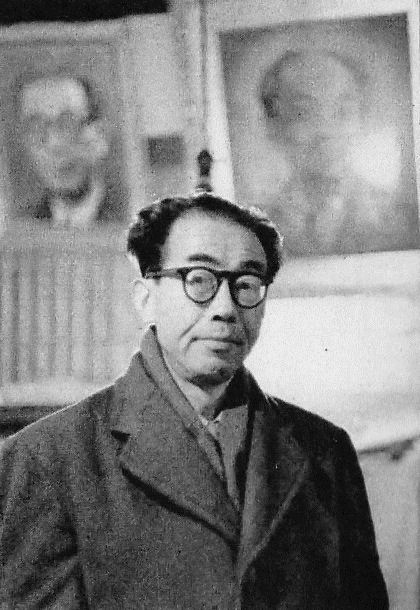
Yasoji Kazahaya

Shōichi Kasuga, Ritsu Ito, Yasoji Kazahaya, and others attempted to reform the JCP in 1940, but were all arrested.

Three groups, unaware of each other, attempted to reconstitute the JCP in 1940. One was formed by Shōichi Kasuga in March, but he and 60 other members were arrested 60 days later. Yasoji Kazahaya, Hiroshi Hasegawa, and Ritsu Ito were arrested before their organization was formed. Shigeo Kamiyama, who claimed to have abandoned communism upon his release from prison in 1937, saw most of his 70 members arrested in February 1941, before his own arrest in May.

A Japanese section of the CPUSA was formed in 1929. The centre of Japanese communism and its printing facilities was shifted from Shanghai to Brooklyn in the United States. Traditional routes of funding and support from the Soviet Union through China was made impossible by Japanese spy networks. The Home Ministry reported that the communist movement in Japan was recovering due to this change.

Throughout World War II, members of the JCP had either been jailed or had gone into exile. Under a modified Peace Preservation Law that went into effect in March 1941, the authorities had the power to detain "thought criminals" who had failed to give sufficient evidence of reform "in order to prevent further offenses by them." The Japanese government would imprison Tokuda Kyuichi and Yoshio Shiga. Released only after the end of the war by the United States. Nosaka Sanzo would live in exile as a Japanese representative of the Comintern. Residing in Moscow, the United States, and then finally in Yenan, China. While in Yenan he would found the Japanese People's Emancipation League and made contacts with the Chinese Communist Party and the United States, only returning to Japan following the end of the war.

=== Postwar reemergence ===
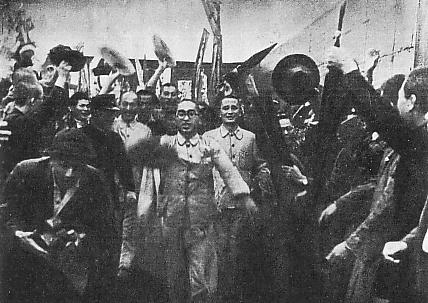
Release of Japanese Communist Party members from prison, 1945

On 4 October 1945, all political prisoners, including communists that had been imprisoned for decades, were ordered to be released by the Allied military occupation of Japan. The first issue of Shimbun Akahata after the end of the war thanked the Allied occupation for the "democratic revolution" that was occurring and called for the recreation of a communist political party. A national conference was held on 8 November 1945, and the 4th Party Congress was held from 1 to 2 December. This was the party's first congress in nineteen years.

According to Jacobin, the JCP, unlike the French and Italian communists, emerged into the postwar period without an organizational base established through wartime resistance movements. As a result, the postwar JCP relied heavily on support of Korean activists in Japan. Of the roughly one thousand supporters who gathered in Western Tokyo to greet party members who had emerged from prison on 10 October 1945, half or more were Korean. Initially the JCP advocated for a united front with the Japan Socialist Party though this did not occur due to profound positional disagreements between the two parties.

Nosaka returned to Japan after fourteen years in exile on 10 January 1946. Under the guidance of Nosaka, the party pursued a policy of portraying itself as "lovable". Nosaka's strategy involved avoiding open calls for violent revolution and taking advantage of the seemingly pro-labor stance of the Allied occupation to organize the urban working classes and win power at the ballot box and through propaganda. In particular, the party was successful in winning acceptance of the notion that communists had been the only ones to resist Japanese wartime militarism. This propaganda effort won the party thousands of new members and an even larger number of sympathizers, especially among artists and intellectuals.

Party membership, which never exceeded 1,000 in the pre-war period, rose from 1,180 in December 1945, to 7,500 by February 1946, 70,000 by December 1947, and over 100,000 by April 1950. Sanbetsu, a union affiliated with the JCP, had around 1.5 million members as overall Japanese union membership rose to 6 million in the post-war period. The JCP benefited from Japan's Korean population that was more favorable to communism due to discrimination and high unemployment rates. The JCP made dramatic gains in the 1949 Japanese general election, tripling its popular vote support and increasing its seat total from 4 to 35.

=== Red Purge and turn to violence ===
Beginning in the fall of 1949, in reaction to the JCP's electoral success, increasing labor strikes, and as part of the "Reverse Course" in Allied occupation policy amid rising Cold War tensions, the Allied occupation authorities and the Japanese government carried out a sweeping Red Purge, firing tens of thousands of communists and suspected communists from government posts, teaching positions at schools, and private corporations. The purge was further intensified in response to the outbreak of the Korean War.

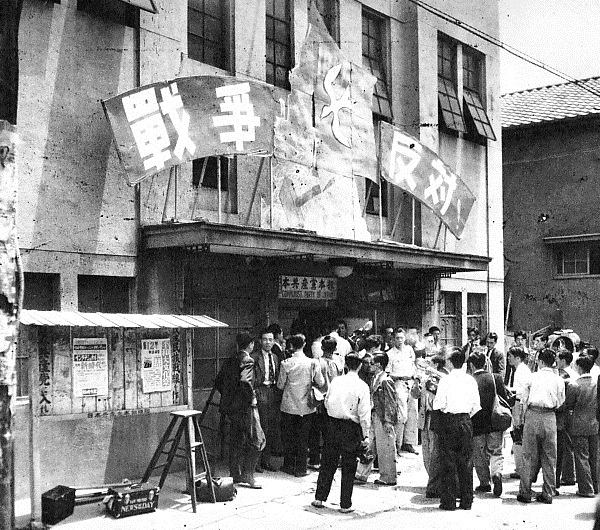
JCP headquarters in 1950. The large banner above the door reads "Oppose war!"

Douglas MacArthur considered banning the JCP on 3 May 1950. Twenty-four members of the party's central committee were removed from office on 6 June and its newspaper, Shimbun Akahata, was suspended on 27 June. A total of 11,000 workers and 1,200 government workers were fired from 1949 to 1950. Union divisions and attacks on communist influence in labor led to Sanbetsu's membership falling to 400,000 by 1949.

Against this backdrop in January 1950, the Soviet-led Cominform, at the behest of Soviet premier Joseph Stalin, issued a blistering criticism of the JCP's peaceful line as "opportunism" and "glorifying American imperialism". It also demanded that the JCP carry out an immediate violent revolution along Maoist lines. This devastating "Cominform Criticism" led rival JCP factions to compete for the Cominform's approval, and ultimately led to the militant "1951 Platform" (51年綱領) which declared that "it would be a serious mistake to think that Japan's liberation can be achieved through peaceful, democratic means" and called for an immediate violent revolution. This thesis was a combination of late Stalinist and Maoist thought. The result was a campaign of violence in which JCP activists threw Molotov cocktails at police boxes and cadres were sent up into the mountains with instructions to organize ostensibly oppressed farmers into "mountain guerrilla squads".

The backlash to the JCP's new militant line was swift and severe as militants were rounded up, tried, and sentenced to lengthy prison terms. In the 1952 Japanese general election, voters vented their ire at the JCP by stripping the party of every single one of its 35 Diet seats, a blow from which it would take two decades to recover. Stunned, the JCP gradually began to pull back from its militant line, a process facilitated by the death of Stalin in 1953. At the 6th Party Congress in 1955, the JCP renounced the militant line completely, returning to its old "peaceful line" of gradually pursuing socialist revolution through peaceful, democratic means.

Shigeo Shida and Ritsu Itō were informally controlling the JCP in the early 1950s. Tokuda's death in 1953 created a power vacuum in the party. Shida won and Itō was expelled from the party, having been accused of being a spy. Shida's influence waned in the late 1950s as Miyamoto, who became General Secretary in 1958, gained power. Members of Shida's faction later broke away to form a new JCP in September 1965. This group performed poorly in elections despite support from the Soviet Union. In 1959, the party held 11 seats in the prefectural assemblies, 349 seats in the city assemblies, and 565 in the town and village assemblies.

=== Anpo protests ===
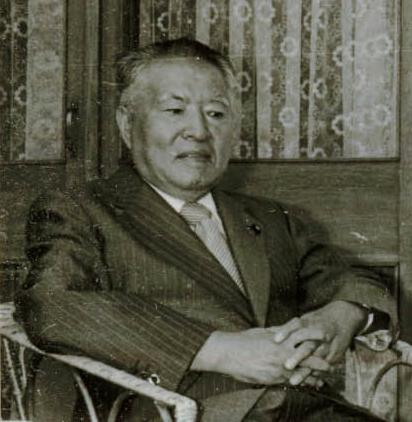
Kenji Miyamoto held the party's leadership position from 1958 to 1982.

In 1960, the JCP played a central role in organizing the massive Anpo protests against the U.S.–Japan Security Treaty, which were the largest protests in Japanese history. The JCP took a different line than the Japan Socialist Party, Sohyo labor federation, and other groups who argued that the main target of the protest movement was Japanese monopoly capitalism. Instead, the JCP argued that the main enemy was American imperialism, and along with affiliated groups, focused its protests around the U.S. Embassy in Tokyo. Accordingly, JCP-linked groups were the driving force behind the "Hagerty Incident" in which the car carrying U.S. President Eisenhower's press secretary James Hagerty was mobbed outside of Tokyo's Haneda Airport on 10 June 1960, provoking a major international incident and helping to precipitate the downfall of the Nobusuke Kishi cabinet.

The Anpo protests were a turning point in the JCP's ongoing attempts to revive its political fortunes after the disastrous turn toward violent revolution in the early 1950s. Although the Maoists had been purged from the party following the earlier disaster, the JCP was still riven by the age-old rivalry between the Rōnō Ha (Worker-Farmer Faction) and the Kōza Ha (Lecture Faction), which dated back to the prewar era. Among other disagreements, the two factions disagreed over which stage of Marxist development Japan was currently in; the Rōnō Ha believed that Japan had already achieved full capitalism, which meant that an immediate socialist revolution was possible, whereas the Kōza Ha argued that Japan's transition to capitalism was not yet complete and that therefore what was needed was a "two-stage" revolution—first a "democratic revolution" that would overthrow American imperialism and establish true democracy, and then a "socialist revolution" that would establish communism. Although the "mainstream" of the JCP, led by Kenji Miyamoto, favored the Kōza Ha interpretation, as late as the 7th Party Congress in 1958 the "anti-mainstream" Rōnō Ha faction, led by Shōjirō Kasuga, still controlled around 40% of the delegates.

The Anpo protests greatly strengthened the hand of the Kōza Ha faction. During the protest, the JCP, still scarred by the backlash to its violent line in the 1950s, consistently advocated peaceful, orderly, and restrained protests. This stance was highly unpopular with the radical student activists of the Zengakuren student federation, who broke decisively with the JCP as a result and began to build a New Left student movement. The movement proved unpopular with the broader public, and the JCP was able to use its image as a "peaceful" and "positive" force during the protests as a recruitment tool. Membership in the party soared during the course of the protests, doubling from 40,000 to 80,000, and most of the new recruits wound up supporting the Kōza Ha line.

=== Zenith ===
Over the remainder of the 1960s, the Kōza Ha was able to purge many members from the Rōnō Ha faction, and others, dissatisfied with JCP policies, quit the party of their own accord. Miyamoto was able to cement his control over the party and reigned as party chairman all the way until 1982. Meanwhile, the party's membership continued to grow rapidly, and the party began to make steady gains at the ballot box, winning more and more seats in the National Diet. By the mid-1960s, the United States Department of State estimated party membership to be approximately 120,000 (0.2% of the working-age population), Miyamoto reported a membership above 100,000 in 1964, and the party had acquired around 300,000 members by 1970.

The JCP's vote totals in the prefectural assemblies doubled between the 1959 and 1963 elections and their seats rose from 12 to 22 despite running 200 fewer candidates. The JCP's vote totals and seats in city council elections rose from 509,069 to 880,991 votes and 218 to 369 seats. Their vote totals in the town council elections doubled and their seats rose from 168 to 314. The JCP's revenue of $9 million in 1969, was larger than all of the other parties except for the LDP.

In the 1972 Japanese general election, the JCP won an astonishing 38 seats in the Diet, surpassing its 1949 high of 35 and signaling the party's full recovery from the disastrous militant line of the early 1950s. Party membership continued to grow in the 1970s, albeit at a slower rate than in the 1960s, reaching approximately 500,000 members by 1980. By the 1970s the JCP was the largest non-ruling communist party in the world.

=== 1990s to 21st century ===
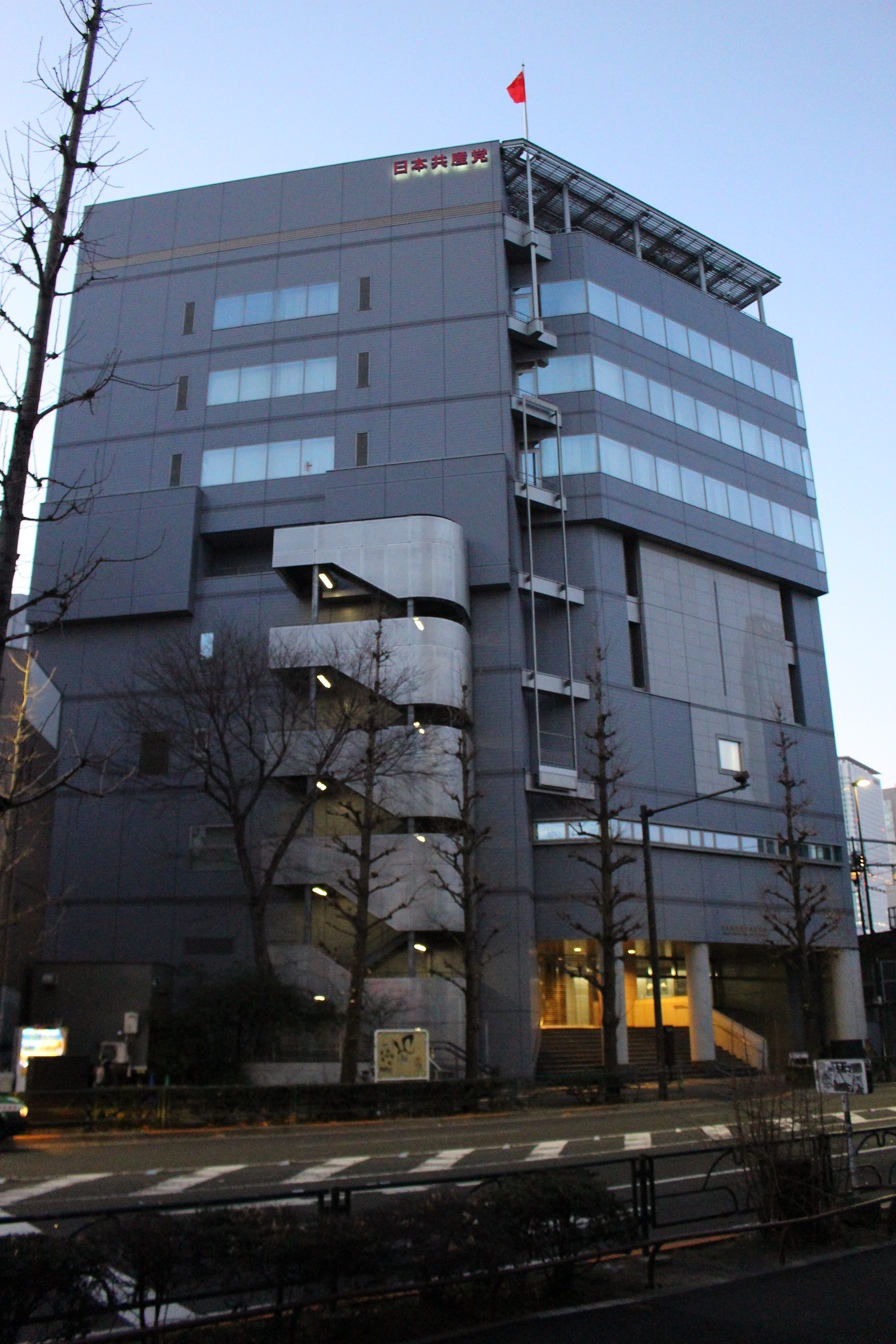
JCP headquarters in Tokyo's Shibuya Ward, pictured in 2018

After the dissolution of the Soviet Union, the JCP released a press statement titled "We welcome the end of a party which embodied the historical evil of great power chauvinism and hegemonism". The party also criticized the Eastern Bloc countries which abandoned socialism, describing their decisions as a "reversal of history". Consequently, the party did not suffer an internal crisis as a result of the Soviet Union's collapse in 1991, nor did it consider disbanding or changing its name; however, owing to a significant loss in electoral support, the party revised its policies in the 1990s and became a more traditional democratic socialist party.

Lam Peng Er argued in the Pacific Affairs in 1996 that "the JCP's viability is crucial to the health of Japanese democracy" because "[i]t is the only established party in parliament that has not been coopted by the conservative parties. It performs the watchdog role against the ruling parties without fear or favor. More importantly, the JCP often offers the only opposition candidate in prefectural governorship, city mayoral and other local elections. Despite the ostensible differences between the non-communist parties at the national level, they often support a joint candidate for governor or mayor so that all parties are assured of being part of the ruling coalition. If the JCP did not offer a candidate, there would be a walkover and Japanese voters would be offered a fait accompli without an electoral avenue of protest. Promoting women candidates in elections to win women's votes is another characteristic of the party. More women are elected under the communist label than other political parties in Japan."

In 2008, foreign media recorded an increase in support for the party due to the effect of the 2008 financial crisis on Japanese workers; however, the party failed to increase its number of seats in the 2009 Japanese general election. Subsequently, the projected decline of the party was halted, with the JCP becoming the third-largest party in the Tokyo Metropolitan Assembly, and also making gains in the House of Councillors, going from six to 11 seats. The party surged in the 2014 elections, receiving 7,040,130 votes (13.3%) in the constituency section and 6,062,962 (11.37%) in the party lists.

During the nomination period of the 2016 Japanese House of Councillors election, the party signed an agreement with the Democratic, Social Democratic and People's Life parties to field a jointly endorsed candidate in each of the 32 districts in which only one seat was contested, uniting in an attempt to take control of the House from the LDP–Komeito coalition. JCP leaders expressed willingness to enter into a coalition with the Democratic Party, a notion which was rejected by then-Democratic Party President Katsuya Okada as being "impossible" in the near future due to what he viewed as some of the "extreme leftist policies" promoted by the JCP. The party had three Councillors up for re-election and fielded a total of 56 candidates in the election, down from 63 candidates in the 2013 election, but still the second-highest number after the LDP. Only 14 of those candidates contested single- and multi-member districts, while 42 contested the 48-seat national proportional representation block.

Councillor Tomoko Tamura was appointed as the party's first chairwoman on 18 January 2024, replacing Kazuo Shii who had occupied the role for over 23 years.

== Ideology and policies ==
The JCP is one of the largest non-governing communist parties in the world, and is described as left-wing. The JCP is considered the leftmost within the left–right spectrum of major political parties in Japan, it is also at times described as far-left and Marxist; however, it is politically moderate and advocates a peaceful transition to communism. The party also states its support for democracy, freedom and human rights, while opposing Japan becoming a single-party state. Marxism–Leninism, which former party chairman Tetsuzo Fuwa had worked for years to make acceptable to the electorate, was abandoned in favor of scientific socialism in 1976. The party adopted a Eurocommunist outlook before the dissolution of the Soviet Union. According to the Encyclopædia Britannica, the JCP became a more traditional democratic socialist party after modifying its policies in the 1990s. This analysis is supported by the Japanese political scientist Kōji Nakakita, who is often cited as a specialist on the JCP. The JCP follows a Marxist ideology, and Kazuo Shii states that the theory of Karl Marx and Friedrich Engels is the foundation of their program.

=== Economic policy ===
The JCP strives to change the nation's economic policy of what it views as serving the interests of large corporations and banks to one of "defending the interests of the people". It advocates establishing "democratic rules" that will check the activities of large corporations and "protect the lives and basic rights of the people". Regarding the international economy, the JCP has advocated establishing a new international democratic economic order on the basis of respect for each country's economic sovereignty. The party strongly opposed Japan's consideration of the failed Trans-Pacific Partnership.

In September 2015, after the passage of the 2015 Japanese military legislation, the JCP called for cooperation from other opposition parties to form an interim government to abolish the bills. It was the first time the party had called for such cooperation with other parties. The JCP supports the abolition of the consumption tax. In July 2025, the JCP stated that it supports a prompt raise in the minimum wage to ¥1,500 per hour with a later aim of ¥1,700 per hour, a decrease in working hours and an increase in "free time", improving conditions for nonregular workers and ending unjust terminations of employment. The party also stated its support for a temporary tax on a degree of the internal reserves of big businesses and ending tax cuts given to large corporations.

=== Social policy ===
The JCP is generally regarded as the most progressive party in Japanese politics. In 2000, the party opposed legislation which reintroduced two symbolic practices to secondary school graduation ceremonies in Japan, namely the raising of the national flag and the singing of the national anthem, both of which the party views as relics of Japan's militarist past.

Abolition of the monarchy was one of the policies supported by the JCP upon its foundation. The JCP has stated that it supports the establishment of a democratic republic, but also that "[the monarchy's] continuation or discontinuation should be decided by the will of the majority of the people in future, when the time is ripe to do so".

==== LGBT rights and feminism ====
The JCP has been one of the political parties to vocally back LGBT rights in Japan; communist lawmakers have been working to win the passage of legalisation of same-sex marriage and anti-discrimination laws in parliament. The JCP jointly supports the passing of an LGBT equality law with the Constitutional Democratic Party of Japan (CDP), the Social Democratic Party (SDP), and Reiwa Shinsengumi.

The JCP has maintained a friendly relationship with the Japanese feminist camp since its inception, and is still the most active in women's rights issues among Japan's major political parties. The JCP was the first party to call for universal suffrage for women. The party supports eliminating the wage gap between men and women and has called for the participation of more women in Japanese politics and political life.

=== Foreign policy ===
The founding platform of the JCP called for the withdrawal of Japanese soldiers from China, Sakhalin, Korea, and Taiwan. The JCP campaigned against the invasion of China and the imperial regime's expansionist policy in Asia. Following the outbreak of the 1931 Japanese invasion of Manchuria, the Japanese Communist Party had infiltrated the military, including in Tokyo, and Osaka. They would distribute leaflets and newspapers opposing the war.

One of the JCP's main objectives is terminating the Japan–United States military alliance and the dismantling of all American military bases in Japan, with a goal to make Japan a non-aligned and neutral country, in accordance with its principles of self-determination and national sovereignty. There are about 130 American military bases and related facilities in Japan, with Okinawa Prefecture alone hosting more than half of United States Forces Japan personnel. The JCP adheres to the idea that Japan, as an Asian country, must not allow its relationship with the United States and the G8 to define its foreign relations and should put its East Asian neighbors at the center of its diplomatic efforts. It supports establishing an "independent foreign policy in the interests of the Japanese people" and rejects "uncritically following any foreign power".

The JCP advocates that Japan issue further apologies for its actions during World War II and has condemned prime ministerial visits to Yasukuni Shrine. In the 1930s, while the JCP was still illegal, it was the only political party to vocally oppose Japan's war with China. The JCP supports Japanese territorial claims over the Kuril (Note: Unlike the view of the Japanese government, the JCP also calls for the return of the Kuril Islands in their entirety.) and Senkaku Islands and Liancourt Rocks. Furthermore, the JCP has condemned North Korea's nuclear-weapons testing, calling for effective sanctions, but opposing the prospect of a military response.

The JCP's leading politicians are known to be the most active opponents of anti-Korean racism and xenophobia in Japan. Contemporary JCP politicians criticize mainstream Japanese politicians for instigating contempt towards Korea, and oppose historical revisionism in regard to Korean history and Japanese war crimes. The JCP was one of the few Japanese parties which supported the Korean independence movement. In the latter half of the 1940s, a training school for Korean revolutionaries was operated jointly by the JCP and several Korean organizations, including the Communist Party of Korea. In South Korea, the JCP is known as the only "pro-South Korea" political party in Japan. Although it is illegal to form a communist party in South Korea, Mindan maintains friendly relations with the JCP. In 2003, due to the consideration of the then liberal South Korean president Roh Moo-hyun, formal exchanges between the JCP and the South Korean government began.

==== Pacifism ====
The JCP has traditionally championed pacifism. With regards to the Japan Self-Defense Forces (Japan's armed forces), the JCP's current policy is that it is not principally opposed to its existence (in 2000 the party stated that it would agree to its use should Japan ever be attacked), but that it will seek to abolish it in the long term, international situation permitting. The JCP opposes the possession of nuclear weapons by any country, military blocs, and attempts to revise Article 9 of the Japanese Constitution, which says that "never again ... [will Japan] be visited with the horrors of war through the action of government". Regarding the resolution of disputes, it argues that priority must be given to peaceful means through negotiations, not to military solutions. The JCP says that Japan must adhere to the United Nations Charter.

==== China and the Soviet Union ====
The JCP took a neutral stance during the Sino-Soviet split and Miyamoto believed that it was unnecessary for the JCP to take a side. A pro-Chinese faction under the leadership of Hakamada Satomi and pro-Soviet faction under the leadership of Yoshio Shiga and Shigeo Kamiyama existed within the JCP; however, both groups were in the minority compared to the neutral faction.

Another pro-Soviet faction of the party was under the leadership of Shōjirō Kasuga. Kasuga's faction formed the Preparatory Commission for a Socialist Reform Movement on 9 October 1961. This group broke away on 3 May 1962, and formed the Unified Socialist League with 600 members. Relations between the Soviet Union and JCP soured as the Soviets attempted to court the JSP. Shiga and Ichizo Suzuki were expelled from the party for voting in favor of the Partial Nuclear Test Ban Treaty in 1963. Shiga and Suzuki were praised in Soviet publications, including Pravda. The publication of Shimbun Akahata faced restrictions in the Soviet Union while Shiga's Voice of Japan did not.

The JCP supported China during the Sino-Indian War. Miyamoto announced the JCP's opposition to the 1968 Soviet invasion of Czechoslovakia. At the same time, the party had distanced itself from Mao and Maoism, which allowed it to avoid being associated with China's Great Leap Forward and Cultural Revolution once they started coming more fully to light in the 1970s. In July 1969, the JCP declared that if it ever came to power, it would permit the free functioning of opposition parties, in an effort to distinguish itself from the one-party states in the Soviet Union and China. A purge of pro-Chinese elements in the JCP, including Tokuda's son Nishizawa Ryūji from the Central Committee, was conducted in 1966. In 1976, mentions of "Marxism–Leninism" in the party program were changed to "scientific socialism".

In 2020, the JCP revised its platform for the first time since 2004. The new platform criticized the Chinese Communist Party, denouncing China's "great-power chauvinism and hegemonism" as "an adverse current to world peace and progress". The JCP also removed a line from its platform which described China as a country "that is beginning a new quest for socialism". JCP members have stated that this was due to human rights conditions in China. The Ministry of Foreign Affairs of China denounced the accusations of the JCP as "groundless and biased".

== Organization ==
The party officially upholds democratic centralism. The party constitutions states decisions "shall be based on democratic discussion and finally decided by majority vote" and that "there shall be no factions or splinter groups". Along with Komeito, the JCP is unique amongst major Japanese political parties for the continuity of its leaders, with Shii having served as JCP chairman from 2000 to 2024.

=== Central organization ===
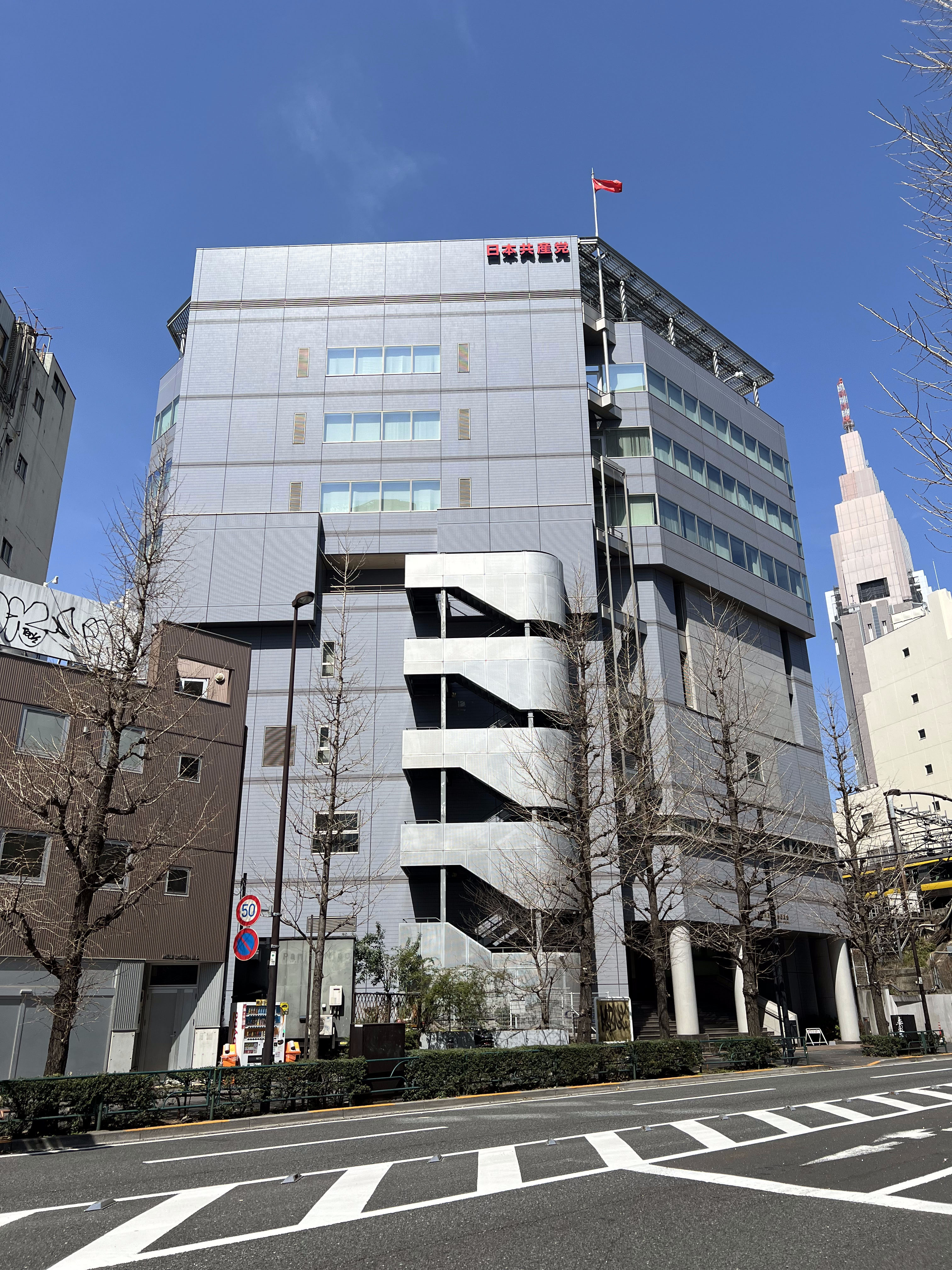
JCP Central Committee Building

According to the party constitution, the highest body of the JCP is the Party Congress, organized by the Central Committee every 2–3 years, though it may be postponed in special circumstances. Between the congresses, the highest body is the Central Committee, elected by the Party Congress. The Central Committee meets two times every year and can also hold a plenum at the request of one-third of its membership.

The Central Committee is made out of regular and alternate members; the latter can participate in Central Committee meetings but cannot vote. The Central Committee also elects the executive committee of the Central Committee, and its chairpersons and vice-chairpersons, the head of the Secretariat. The current chairman of the executive committee of the Central Committee of the JCP is Tomoko Tamura. The Central Committee also appoints the Disciplinary Commission and the Audit Commission, and may elect a Central Committee chairperson; the current Central Committee chair is Kazuo Shii. The executive committee manages party affairs between Central Committee meetings. It appoints the members of the Secretariat, which manages the day-to-day affairs of the party center, and the Central Organ Paper Editors Commission. It also elects the Standing Committee of the executive committee.

=== Press ===
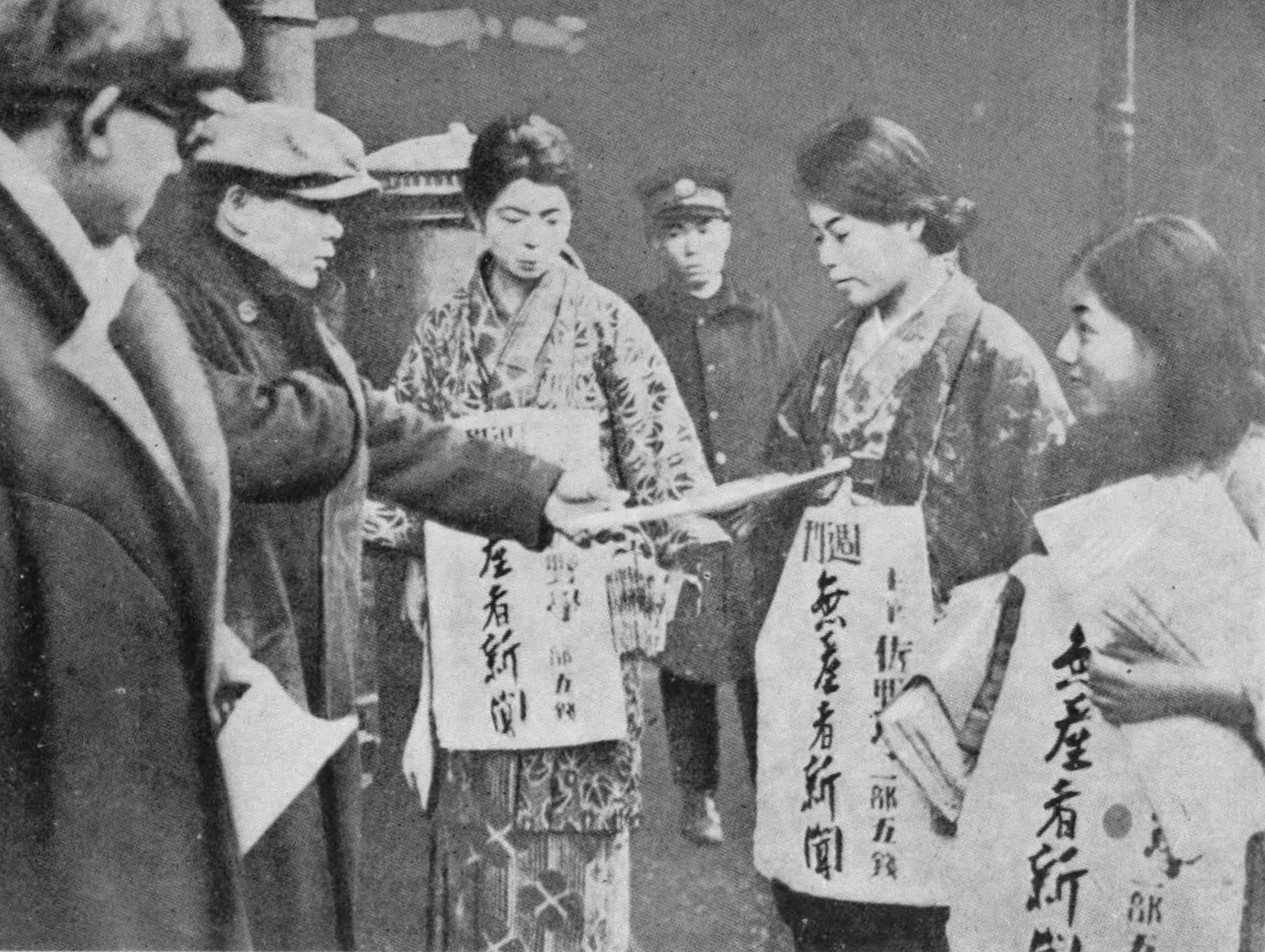
Women distributing Musansha Shinbun on the streets of Osaka, January 9, 1926.

Shimbun Akahata (Japanese: Red Flag Newspaper) is the daily organ of the JCP in the form of a national newspaper. Musansha Shinbun (Japanese: Proletarian News) was another publication of the party which was circulated between 1925 and 1929. Several other newspapers preceded and merged into Red Flag, including Daini Musansha Shinbun (Japanese: The Second Proletarian News), which was merged into Red Flag in 1932. Daini Musansha Shinbun was itself the immediate successor to the original The Proletarian News, which was banned by the government in September 1929. Daini Musansha Shinbun began publication immediately after the ban.

In the past, the party published numerous other newspapers as well, including another national paper called Nihon Seiji Shinbun (Japanese: Japan Political News) and a theoretical journal called Zenshin (Japanese: Forward). The party also published several regional newspapers such as Class War in and around Kyoto, Osaka and Kobe, Shinetsu Red Flag in Nagano and Hokkaido News in Hokkaido. They also published numerous (the exact number is unknown) factory newspapers. Some regional newspapers, such as Shin Kanagawa (Japanese: New Kanagawa) in Kanagawa, are still published.

=== Affiliated organizations ===
The youth wing of JCP is the Democratic Youth League of Japan. In the 1920s and 1930s, the organization published several newspapers of its own, including Rēnin Seinen (English: Lenin Youth) and Proletarian Youth.

The party also has affiliate medical and consumer co-ops. The Japanese Consumers' Co-Operative Union (JCCU), the umbrella body of the co-operative movement in Japan, has a sizable number of communists in its ranks, although the exact numbers are difficult to verify. Another example of the JCP's prevalence in the co-operative movement is the Co-op Kanagawa in the Kanagawa Prefecture, which has 800,000 members and has historical ties to the JCP. It still advertises and occasionally is published in JCP newspapers such as Red Flag and New Kanagawa. The prevalence of house unions in Japan as opposed to enterprise unions has prompted much of the exceptional development of other organizations by the JCP, as well as causing the JCP to seek other external organizational support, including from kōenkai.

Official logo of the Japanese Communist Party and the highlighted acronym JCP

The Choir of JCP-fans (JCP-fan zasshōdan) is a musical group which supports the JCP. Its repertory and artistic activity are strongly linked to The Singing Voice of Japan (Nihon no utagoe / Utagoe-undō), a musical movement of Japanese working class that dates back to 1948, when the Choir of the Communist Youth League of Japan (Nihon-seinen-kyōsan-dōmei Chuō-gasshōdan) was established. The group was founded in Kyoto in 2011 and is directed by Tadao Yamamoto, a composer, accordionist, choir director, and ordinary member of the National Council of The Singing Voice of Japan. In various cultural events organized by the party, the Choir of JCP-fans appears as an element among the joined choirs of the volunteer singers of The Singing Voice of Japan. As of 2016, the choir is the only organization of Japanese musicians specializing in political support and in the cultural activity of the party. Notable concerts and performances by the choir include:

- 11 February 2011, Kyoto Kaikan Hall: Concert sponsored by the Kyoto Committee of the Japanese Communist Party (JCP).
- 1 August 2013, Nishijin Bunka Center (Kyoto): Cultural Live Revolutionary Pub, in collaboration with Tokiko Nishiyama, former JCP member of the House of Councilors.
- 23 September 2014, Takaragaike Park (Kyoto): Festival Kyoto ed. 2014, organized by the Kyoto Committee of the JCP.
- 1 February 2015, Kyoiku Bunka Center (Kyoto): Festival sponsored by the Kyoto Committee of the JCP.
- 29 April 2016, Takaragaike Park (Kyoto): Festival Kyoto ed. 2016, organized by the Kyoto Committee of the JCP: performance with Seifuku Kōjō Iinkai and Akira Koike, JCP member of the House of Councilors and Secretary-General of the party.

== Membership ==
44.09% of the JCP's membership in 1966 was between the ages of 30–39, 27.50% were below 29, 15.21% were 40–49, 8.81% were above 50, and 3.74% were of an unknown age. The most common form of employment was in factory work, civil service, education, and agrarian work. During the 1980s, party membership began to decline, falling to 500,000 by 1990, and then to 370,000 by 1997.

Following its advancement in the 2013 Tokyo prefectural election, the party enjoyed an increase in membership growth, with over 1,000 people joining in each of the final three months of 2013. Approximately 20% of new members during this period were aged 20 to 40, showing a higher ratio of young people joining the party than in the past. The JCP had approximately 320,000 members in January 2014. Membership numbers declined, with membership around 300,000 in 2017, 270,000 in 2020, and 250,000 in 2024.

Membership figures
Year	Number	Reference	Notes
March 1948	18,088		
1949	100,000		
July 1958	45,000		7th Party Congress
July 1961	88,000		8th Party Congress
November 1964	140,000		9th Party Congress
November 1965	165,000		
October 1966	250,000–270,000		10th Party Congress
July 1970	300,000		11th Party Congress

== Notable members ==
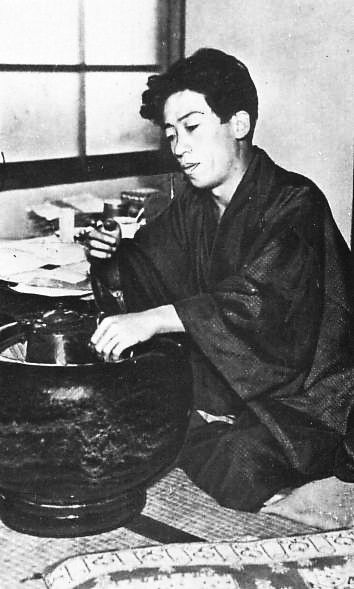
Takiji Kobayashi, prominent author of proletarian literature

=== Pre-war (1922–1941) ===
- Kanson Arahata
- Sen Katayama
- Hajime Kawakami
- Fukumoto Kazuo
- Takiji Kobayashi
- Toshihiko Sakai
- Hitoshi Yamakawa
- Sakaguchi Kiichiro
- Eitaro Noro

=== Wartime (1941–1945) ===
- Kim Chon-hae
- Sanzō Nosaka
- Yoshio Shiga
- Kyuichi Tokuda
- Wataru Kaji

=== Post-war (1945–present) ===
- Kiyoteru Hanada
- Kenji Miyamoto
- Hiromu Murakami
- Tetsuzo Fuwa
- Kazuo Shii
- Hisashi Inoue
- Takeshi Kimura
- Tomoko Tamura

== Leaders ==
=== Chairman of the Central Committee ===
No.	Photo	Name (Birth–death)	Term of office	
No.	Photo	Name (Birth–death)	Took office	Left office
1		Sanzō Nosaka (1892–1993)	1 August 1958	31 July 1987
2		Kenji Miyamoto (1908–2007)	31 July 1982	26 September 1997
3		Tetsuzo Fuwa (1930–2025)	24 November 2000	14 January 2006
4		Kazuo Shii (born 1954)	18 January 2024	Incumbent

=== Head of the Secretariat ===
No.	Photo	Name (Birth–death)	Term of office	
No.	Photo	Name (Birth–death)	Took office	Left office
1		Tetsuzo Fuwa (1930–2025)	7 July 1970	31 July 1982
2		Mitsuhiro Kaneko (1924–2016)	31 July 1982	13 July 1990
3		Kazuo Shii (born 1954)	13 July 1990	24 November 2000
4		Tadayoshi Ichida (born 1942)	24 November 2000	18 January 2014
5		Yoshiki Yamashita (born 1960)	18 January 2014	11 April 2016
6		Akira Koike (born 1960)	11 April 2016	Incumbent

== Election results ==
=== House of Representatives ===
Prior to 1996, the entire House of Representatives was elected by majoritarian or "semi-proportional" voting systems with votes cast for individuals (1946: limited voting in multi-member districts, 1947 to 1993 SNTV in multi-member districts). Since 1996, the House of Representatives is elected in a parallel election system—essentially two separate elections only in the lower house complicated by the fact that a candidate may stand in both segments and the sekihairitsu system which ties proportional list ranking to FPTP results: only the majority of members the House of Representatives, 295 (initially 300) seats, are elected in a majoritarian system with voting for candidates (first-past-the-post in single-member districts), while the remaining 180 (initially 200) seats are elected by a proportional representation system (votes are cast for party lists in regional multi-member districts, called "blocks" in the House of Representatives). The votes and vote percentages in the table below are the JCP candidates' vote totals for the whole election from before 1993 and just the votes for the party in the election to the 180 proportional seats after 1996.

The JCP polled 11.3% of the vote in 2000, 8.2% in 2003, 7.3% in 2005, 7.0% in 2009, and 6.2% in 2012. These results seemed to indicate a trend of declining support, but the party won 21 seats in 2014, up from eight in the previous general election, as the JCP received 7,040,130 votes (13.3%) in the constituency section and 6,062,962 (11.37%) in the party lists. This continued a new wave of support that was also evident in the 2013 Tokyo prefectural election in which the party doubled its representation. Fighting on a platform directly opposed to neoliberalism, the Trans-Pacific Partnership, attempts to rewrite the constitution, United States Forces Japan, and nuclear power, the JCP tapped into a minority current that seeks an alternative to Japan's rightward direction. Following the 2016 Japanese House of Councillors election, the party held 13 seats in the House of Councillors. After the 2017 Japanese general election, the party held 12 seats in the House of Representatives, and since the 2021 Japanese general election, it holds 10 seats.

House of Representatives
Election	Leader	No. of candidates	Seats			Position	Constituency votes		PR Block votes		Status
Election	Leader	No. of candidates	No.	±	Share	Position	No.	Share	No.	Share	Status
1946	Kyuichi Tokuda	143	6 / 464		1.3%	4th	2,135,757	3.85%			Opposition
1947	Kyuichi Tokuda	120	4 / 466	▼2	0.9%	▼5th	1,002,883	3.67%			Opposition
1949	Kyuichi Tokuda	115	35 / 466	▲31	7.5%	▲4th	2,984,780	9.76%			Opposition
1952	Kyuichi Tokuda	107	0 / 466	▼35	0%	▼5th	896,765	2.54%			Extra-parliamentary (Note: The JCP retained members in the House of Councillors.)
1953	Sanzō Nosaka	88	1 / 466	▲1	0.2%	▼6th	655,990	1.90%			Opposition
1955	Sanzō Nosaka	60	2 / 467	▲1	0.4%	▲5th	733,121	1.98%			Opposition
1958	Sanzō Nosaka	114	1 / 467	▼1	0.2%	▲3rd	1,012,035	2.55%			Opposition
1960	Kenji Miyamoto	118	3 / 467	▲2	0.6%	▼4th	1,156,723	2.93%			Opposition
1963	Kenji Miyamoto	118	5 / 467	▲2	1.1%	4th	1,646,477	4.01%			Opposition
1967	Kenji Miyamoto	123	5 / 486	0	1.0%	▼5th	2,190,564	4.76%			Opposition
1969	Kenji Miyamoto	123	14 / 486	▲9	2.9%	5th	3,199,032	6.81%			Opposition
1972	Kenji Miyamoto	122	38 / 491	▲24	7.7%	▲3rd	5,496,827	10.49%			Opposition
1976	Kenji Miyamoto	128	17 / 511	▼21	3.3%	▼4th	5,878,192	10.38%			Opposition
1979	Kenji Miyamoto	128	39 / 511	▲22	7.6%	▲3rd	5,625,527	10.42%			Opposition
1980	Kenji Miyamoto	129	29 / 511	▼10	5.7%	3rd	5,803,613	9.83%			Opposition
1983	Tetsuzo Fuwa	129	26 / 511	▼3	5.1%	▼4th	5,302,485	9.34%			Opposition
1986	Tetsuzo Fuwa	129	26 / 512	0	5.1%	▲3rd	5,313,246	8.79%			Opposition
1990	Tetsuzo Fuwa	131	16 / 512	▼10	3.1%	▼4th	5,226,987	7.96%			Opposition
1993	Tetsuzo Fuwa	129	15 / 511	▼1	2.9%	▼6th	4,834,587	7.70%			Opposition
1996	Tetsuzo Fuwa	321	26 / 500	▲11	5.2%	▲4th	7,096,766	12.55%	7,268,743	13.08%	Opposition
2000	Tetsuzo Fuwa	332	20 / 480	▼6	4.2%	▼5th	7,352,844	12.08%	6,719,016	11.23%	Opposition
2003	Kazuo Shii	316	9 / 480	▼11	1.9%	▲4th	4,837,953	8.13%	4,586,172	7.76%	Opposition
2005	Kazuo Shii	292	9 / 480	0	1.9%	4th	4,937,375	7.25%	4,919,187	7.25%	Opposition
2009	Kazuo Shii	171	9 / 480	0	1.9%	4th	2,978,354	4.22%	4,943,886	7.03%	Opposition
2012	Kazuo Shii	322	8 / 480	▼1	1.7%	▼7th	4,700,290	7.88%	3,689,159	6.13%	Opposition
2014	Kazuo Shii	315	21 / 475	▲13	4.4%	▲5th	7,040,170	13.30%	6,062,962	11.37%	Opposition
2017	Kazuo Shii	243	12 / 465	▼9	2.6%	5th	4,998,932	9.02%	4,404,081	7.90%	Opposition
2021	Kazuo Shii	130	10 / 465	▼2	2.2%	▼6th	2,639,631	4.59%	4,166,076	7.25%	Opposition
2024	Tomoko Tamura	236	8 / 465	▼2	1.7%	▼7th	3,695,807	6.81%	3,362,966	6.16%	Opposition
2026	Tomoko Tamura	176	4 / 465	▼4	0.9%	7th	2,283,885	4.05%	2,519,807	4.40%	Opposition

=== House of Councillors ===
Elections to the House of Councillors are staggered. Every three years, half of the House is up for election to six-year terms. In addition, a parallel election system is used: the majority of members of the House of Councillors (currently 146 of 242, or 73 in one regular election to one half of the House) are elected in 45 (formerly 46→47) prefectural districts, votes are cast for individual candidates by SNTV, but with both multi- and single-member districts used and in the latter SNTV becomes identical to FPTP (winner-takes-all). The remaining, currently 96 members (48 per regular election) are elected in one nationwide district. Until 1980, votes there were cast for individuals too by SNTV. Since 1983, votes are cast for party lists and the seats are allocated proportionally (d'Hondt) in the nationwide district. Unlike in general elections to the lower house, a candidate may not be nominated in both segments of one regular election to the upper house. The seats totals show below are the JCP's overall post-election seat totals, not just their seats elected in that particular year. The votes shown are the votes in the election for the 48 (formerly 50) seats in the nationwide SNTV/PR segment.

House of Councillors
Election	National district votes		Total		Status
Election	No. of votes	%	Seats	±	Status
1947	610,948	2.9	4 / 250		Opposition
1950	1,333,872	4.8	4 / 260	0	Opposition
1953	293,877	1.1	2 / 260	2	Opposition
1956	599,254	2.1	2 / 254	0	Opposition
1959	551,916	1.9	3 / 254	1	Opposition
1962	1,123,947	3.1	4 / 254	1	Opposition
1965	1,652,364	4.4	6 / 254	2	Opposition
1968	2,146,879	5.0	7 / 251	1	Opposition
1971	3,219,307	8.1	10 / 251	3	Opposition
1974	4,931,650	9.4	19 / 260	9	Opposition
1977	4,260,050	8.4	16 / 252	3	Opposition
1980	4,072,019	7.3	12 / 252	4	Opposition
1983	4,163,877	8.9	14 / 252	2	Opposition
1986	5,430,838	9.5	16 / 252	2	Opposition
1989	3,954,408	7.0	14 / 252	2	Opposition
1992	3,532,956	7.9	11 / 252	3	Opposition
1995	3,873,955	9.5	14 / 252	3	Opposition
1998	8,195,078	14.6	23 / 252	9	Opposition
2001	4,329,210	7.9	20 / 247	3	Opposition
2004	4,363,107	7.8	9 / 242	11	Opposition
2007	4,407,937	7.5	7 / 242	2	Opposition
2010	3,563,556	6.1	6 / 242	1	Opposition
2013	5,154,055	9.7	11 / 242	5	Opposition
2016	6,016,245	10.7	14 / 242	3	Opposition
2019	4,483,411	8.95	13 / 245	1	Opposition
2022	3,618,343	6.82	11 / 248	2	Opposition
2025	2,864,738	4.84	7 / 248	4	Opposition

== Current members of National Diet ==
=== House of Representatives ===
- Akira Kasai (Tokyo PR)
- Keiji Kokuta (Kinki PR, contested Kyoto-1st)
- Takeshi Miyamoto (Kinki PR)
- Tōru Miyamoto (Tokyo PR, contested Tokyo-20th)
- Nobuko Motomura (Tōkai PR)
- Kazuo Shii (Minami-Kantō PR)
- Tetsuya Shiokawa (Kita-Kantō PR)
- Chizuko Takahashi (Tōhoku PR)
- Takaaki Tamura (Kyushu PR, contested Fukuoka-10th)

=== House of Councillors ===
Term expires in 2025 (elected in 2019)

- Yoshiko Kira (Tokyo at-large)
- Gaku Ito (Saitama at-large)
- Akiko Kurabayashi (Kyoto at-large)
- Akira Koike (National PR)
- Yoshiki Yamashita (National PR)
- Satoshi Inoue (National PR)
- Tomoko Kami (National PR)

Term expires in 2028 (elected in 2022)

- Taku Yamazoe (Tokyo at-large)
- Tomoko Tamura (National PR)
- Sohei Nihi (National PR)
- Tomo Iwabuchi (National PR)

== See also ==
- Appeal to the People
- Democracy in Marxism
- Political dissidence in the Empire of Japan
- List of foreign delegations at the 21st Japanese Communist Party Congress
- List of foreign delegations at the 22nd Japanese Communist Party Congress
- Socialist thought in Imperial Japan
- Zengakuren

== Works cited ==
=== Books ===
- Abe, Hitoshi; Shindō, Muneyuki; Kawato, Sadafumi (2018). Pekkanen, Robert J. (ed.). Critical Readings on the Liberal Democratic Party in Japan. Vol. 1. Brill. p. 106. ISBN 978-90-04-38052-3.
- Banno, Junji (2012). Japan's Modern History, 1857–1937: A new political narrative. Translated by Stockwin, J. A. A. Routledge. ISBN 978-1-315-77395-7.
- Beckmann, George M.; Okubo, Genji (1969). The Japanese Communist Party, 1922–1945. Stanford, CA: Stanford University Press. ISBN 978-0-8047-0674-2.
- Colbert, Evelyn (1973) [Originally published 1952]. The Left Wing In Japanese Politics. Greenwood Publishing Group. ISBN 0-8371-6880-5.
- Cole, Allan; Totten, George; Uyehara, Cecil (1966). Socialist Parties In Postwar Japan. Yale University Press.
- Gordon, Andrew (20 October 1993). Postwar Japan as History. University of California Press. ISBN 978-0-520-91144-4.
- Hayes, Louis D. (2018). Introduction to Japanese Politics (6th ed.). Routledge. ISBN 978-1-315-27709-7.
- Hoover, William D. (2018). Historical Dictionary of Postwar Japan. Rowman & Littlefield. ISBN 978-1-5381-1156-7.
- Hrebenar, Ronald J., ed. (2019). Japan's New Party System. Routledge. ISBN 978-0-429-72108-3.
- Itasaka, Gen (1983). Kodansha Encyclopedia of Japan. Vol. 1. Kodansha. ISBN 0-87011-621-5.
- Itasaka, Gen (1983). Kodansha Encyclopedia of Japan. Vol. 3. Kodansha. ISBN 0-87011-623-1.
- Johnson, Chalmers A. (1990). An Instance of Treason: Ozaki Hotsumi and the Sorge Spy Ring. Stanford University Press. ISBN 978-0-8047-1766-3.
- Jou, Willy; Endo, Masahisa, eds. (2016). Generational Gap in Japanese Politics: A Longitudinal Study of Political Attitudes and Behaviour. Palgrave Macmillan. ISBN 978-1-137-50342-8.
- Kapur, Nick (2018a). Japan at the Crossroads: Conflict and Compromise after Anpo. Cambridge, MA: Harvard University Press. ISBN 978-0-674-98442-4.
- Langer, Paul (1972). Communism in Japan: A Case of Political Naturalization. Hoover Institution. ISBN 0-8179-3301-8.
- Linkhoeva, Tatiana (2020). Revolution Goes East: Imperial Japan and Soviet Communism. Cornell University Press. doi:10.1353/book.73082. ISBN 978-1-5017-4809-7. JSTOR 10.7591/j.ctv310vjxj.
- Peng-Er, Lam (2005). Green Politics in Japan. Routledge. ISBN 978-1-134-63766-9.
- Scalapino, Robert (1967). The Japanese Communist Movement, 1920-1966. University of California Press. ISBN 978-0-520-01134-2.
- Swearingen, Rodger; Langer, Paul (1968). Red Flag In Japan: International Communism In Action 1919-1951. Greenwood Publishing Group. ISBN 0-8371-6880-5.
- Uno, Shun'ichi [in Japanese] (1991). Nihon zenshi: Japan chronik (in Japanese). Tokyo: Kodansha Ltd. ISBN 4-06-203994-X.
- Walker, David; Gray, Daniel (13 August 2009). The A to Z of Marxism. Scarecrow Press. ISBN 978-0-8108-7018-5.

=== Journal articles ===
- Benjamin, Roger W.; Kautsky, John H. (March 1968). "Communism and Economic Development". American Political Science Review. 62 (1). American Political Science Association: 110–123. doi:10.2307/1953329. JSTOR 1953329.
- Berton, Peter (May 2000). "The Japanese Communist Party and Its Transformations". Japan Policy Research Institute (JPRI Working Paper No. 67). Archived from the original on 5 August 2016.
- Crooke, Matthew (2018). Betraying Revolution: The Foundations of the Japanese Communist Party (master's thesis). University of San Francisco. Archived from the original on 23 October 2023.
- Er, Lam Peng (Autumn 1996). "The Japanese Communist Party: Organization and Resilience in the Midst of Adversity". Pacific Affairs. 69 (3): 361–379. doi:10.2307/2760924. JSTOR 2760924.
- Kapur, Nick (2018b). "The Empire Strikes Back? The 1968 Meiji Centennial Celebrations and the Revival of Japanese Nationalism". Japanese Studies. 38 (3): 305–328. doi:10.1080/10371397.2018.1543533. S2CID 149788596.
- Sugita, Yoneyuki (11 May 2021). "A Paradox: the Red Purge Has Made Japan a Law-Abiding Nation". East Asia. 38 (4): 353–371. doi:10.1007/s12140-021-09365-y. ISSN 1096-6838. S2CID 236582291.

=== News ===
- Demetriou, Danielle (18 October 2008). "Japan's young turn to Communist Party as they decide capitalism has let them down". The Daily Telegraph. Archived from the original on 2 September 2025.
- Dvorak, Phred (22 July 2013). "Japan Communists Celebrate a Little Victory". The Wall Street Journal.
- Hasegawa, Kenji (15 July 2022). "The Japanese Communist Party Has Been a Vital Presence in Japan's Politics". Jacobin. Archived from the original on 3 October 2024.
- Johnston, Eric (18 January 2024). "Japanese Communist Party picks first-ever female leader". Japan Times. Archived from the original on 12 August 2025.
- Miki, Rieko (19 January 2024). "Japanese Communist Party seeks reboot with 1st female leader". Nikkei Asia. Archived from the original on 1 December 2024.
- Osaki, Tomohiro (21 June 2016). "Abe to 'take responsibility' if ruling bloc fails to win 61 seats in Upper House election". Japan Times.
- Ryall, Julian (20 January 2020). "China's Communist Party a threat to peace, says Japanese counterpart". South China Morning Post. Archived from the original on 10 October 2025.
- Sanger, David (22 September 1992). "Japanese Communist Disgraced at 100". The New York Times. Archived from the original on 30 March 2023.

=== Web ===
- "The Communist Movement in Japan" (PDF). Central Intelligence Agency. 15 August 1962. Archived (PDF) from the original on 15 March 2025.
