= Shigeo Kamiyama =

Japanese politician

- 神山 茂夫

Member of the House of Representatives
- In office 28 January 1949 – 6 June 1950
- Preceded by: Daikichirō Tagawa
- Succeeded by: Mitsu Kōno
- Constituency: Tokyo 5th

Personal details
- Born: 1 February 1905 Shimonoseki, Yamaguchi, Japan
- Died: 8 July 1974 (aged 69)
- Party: Communist

Shigeo Kamiyama (神山 茂夫, Kamiyama Shigeo) (1 February 1905 – 8 July 1974) was a Japanese communist. He was born in 1905 in Shimonoseki. In 1928, he joined the Japanese Communist Party.

On 1 May 1941, he was arrested as the leader of the Communist Party Rebuilding Committee. He was imprisoned in Sugamo prison where he met Hotsumi Ozaki.

Kamiyama remained in jail until 1945. After the war, he was active in the Japanese Communist Party.

== See also ==
- Japanese dissidence during the Shōwa period
