= Relations between the Japanese Communist Party and the Chinese Communist Party =

Flags of the Chinese Communist Party and the Japanese Communist Party.

Relations between the Japanese Communist Party and the Chinese Communist Party have moved between contrasting periods of cooperation, conflict, and reconciliation throughout the history of the Japanese Communist Party (JCP) and the Chinese Communist Party (CCP).

Cooperation between the two Communist parties was initially driven by mutual opposition to Japanese imperialism before and during the Second World War, but relations became strained after the war over ideological disagreements and disputes over the influence of China and the Soviet Union. The JCP initially aligned with China during the Sino-Soviet split, but relations broke down and ceased in 1966 amid disagreements over the Vietnam War and Soviet policies. The JCP then adopted a policy of political independence from both Moscow and Beijing as well as other foreign communist parties, becoming sharply critical of the CCP.

For several decades, relations between the two parties remained hostile despite the normalisation of diplomatic relations between China and Japan in 1972. Relations began to improve in the late 1990s, with an agreement to restore party-to-party relations in 1998, although the JCP continued to criticise China's economic and political policies and their handling of human rights matters, territorial disputes, and international affairs. After 2016, the relationship deteriorated again when the JCP accused China of increasingly hegemonic and authoritarian conduct and removed its earlier characterisation of China as pursuing a "new pursuit of socialism", in 2020. From 2023, however, the JCP again sought dialogue with the CCP, emphasising cooperation on China–Japan relations (which the JCP were concerned were deteriorating at the time) and regional stability while maintaining their political and ideological differences.

== History ==
=== During the Second World War ===
Collaboration between the JCP and CCP can be traced back to the Second Sino-Japanese War. In 1931, following the Mukden Incident, the CCP and the JCP jointly issued “The Declaration by the CCP and the JCP on the Japanese Occupation of the Northeast of China”. In this declaration, they emphasized that Japanese imperialism is the common enemy of the Chinese and Japanese working masses. The leadership of the CCP emphasized that a worldwide antifascist front and national anti-Japanese front in China must be supplemented by an anti-war front among the Japanese people. With Mao Zedong being quoted as saying that "The Japanese Revolution will occur after the first severe defeats suffered by the Japanese Army."

That same year, Nosaka Sanzo, founder of the JCP, would make contacts with CCP members Ren Bishi and Kang Sheng. Communications with both parties would mostly be conducted through the Comintern.

The relations with the JCP and the CCP would deepen with the outbreak of the Second Sino-Japanese War in 1937, and the arrival of Sanzo Nosaka in Yan'an in 1940. The then capital of Red China. In 1944, with both the support of the JCP and the CCP, the Japanese People's Emancipation League was founded. A Chinese-aligned Japanese resistance organization made up of defectors from the Japanese Army. The organization would engage in propaganda work. Targeting the Japanese occupation.

=== After the Second World War ===
Following Japan's defeat in World War II, several leading Communists, including Tokuda Kyuichi and Miyamoto Kenji, were released, and the party resumed its activities at its 4th Congress in December 1945. In January 1946, Nosaka Sanzo returned to Japan from Yan'an and, at the 5th Congress in February, formulated the "Theory of Peaceful Revolution", which stated that "the immediate fundamental objective of the JCP is to complete the bourgeois-democratic revolution underway in our country peacefully and democratically." This new reformist line brought them some success, notably in the 24th general election for the House of Representatives in January 1949, in which 35 Communist candidates were elected.

However, on January 6, 1950, the Cominform criticized Nosaka's theory of peaceful revolution in an article at For a Lasting Peace, for a People's Democracy!, stating that it "glorifies American imperialism and has no connection whatsoever with Marxism-Leninism." The Cominform's criticisms caused unrest in the JCP, and on January 12, Tokuda published a firm response titled "Political Impressions", stating that "criticizing the words and actions of a comrade (Nosaka) without knowing the true situation in Japan will cause grave harm to the people and our Party" and "at first glance, the policy may appear pro-American, but in fact it is not, and there is no mistake in the Party's policy." On the other hand, the non-mainstream faction, represented by Miyamoto Kenji, opposed this view and held that the Cominform's criticisms should be accepted (for this reason, Miyamoto and the non-mainstream faction became known as the "international faction" or "Kokusai").

In China, the Communist Party, which had won the Civil War and proclaimed the establishment of the People's Republic of China in October 1949 with Mao as Chairman of the Central People's Government of the People's Republic, also supported the Soviet Union against Nosaka, and on November 17, 1950, in its official newspaper, the People's Daily, declared that "Nosaka's theory that the bourgeoisie can be used to obtain state power by peaceful means is incorrect, and the content of Tokuda's impressions is pitiful," and called on Nosaka to engage in self-criticism. In response to this, on January 18, 1951, Nosaka criticized his own theory of peaceful revolution and declared that he fully accepted the Cominform's criticisms. Internally, this resulted in a victory for Miyamoto's faction, but the main faction that agreed with Tokuda's impressions (hereafter referred to as the "Sokan faction") could not bear this humiliation and demoted Miyamoto and the other members of the "international faction". Furthermore, when the Red Purge was ordered to remove JCP officials from public office, they went underground. Tokuda and Nosaka defected to Beijing in September 1950 and founded the Beijing Agency (Pekin kikan). Meanwhile, Miyamoto and other internationalists who remained on the ground formed the "National Unified Conference of the Japanese Communist Party" in December 1950 to counter the Sokan faction. However, at the 4th National Conference (4th Zenkyo) in February 1951, the Sokan faction recognized it as a splinter group and issued a "Resolution on Interfactional Struggle". Tokuda met with Mao in Beijing and then flew to Moscow to meet with Stalin, seeking backing within the Chinese and Soviet Communist Parties. As a result of this pressure, the leaders of the international faction were asked to submit a letter of self-criticism; Miyamoto was also forced to do so, and the Unification Conference was dissolved. The international faction was not allowed to return to the party immediately, and it was not until 1954 that Miyamoto was allowed to return to the leadership.

After forcing the International faction to surrender, the Sokan faction declared a policy of struggle in the "Basic Struggle Policy for the Immediate Future" of the 4th National Conference and in the "Immediate Demands of the Japanese Communist Party" (commonly known as the "51 Platform") at the 5th National Conference in October 1951, and issued instructions from the underground radio station Free Japan Broadcasting calling on the Central Self-Defense Forces and others to initiate armed struggle. The 51 Platform is said to have been a joint effort between Moscow and Beijing, and the CCP expressed its support for it. However, in April 1952, the US occupation was lifted with the entry into force of the San Francisco Peace Treaty, thereby ending the Red Purge, allowing the JCP to return to legal politics. Stalin died in March 1953, a ceasefire agreement was signed in the Korean War, which was at a stalemate in July, and Tokuda died in Beijing in October. Furthermore, as a result of the Red Purge, armed struggle, and confusion over its ideological stance, the JCP lost much of its popular support, and in the 25th general election for the House of Representatives in October 1952, all its members were defeated. It took a long time for the party to regain its strength thereafter, and arguments to justify an armed uprising virtually disappeared, thus losing the possibility of a successful revolution. In response to both internal and external changes, and at the recommendation of the USSR, which was moving towards peaceful coexistence, the Sokan and Kokusai factions began to grow closer around 1954. At the 6th National Conference, held in July 1955, the party was reunified and a resolution was passed to abandon all Chinese-style revolutionary armed struggle.

=== After the Sino-Soviet split ===
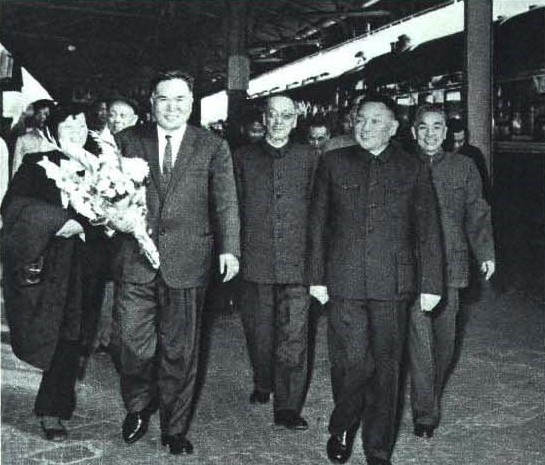
Deng Xiaoping, then Secretary-General of the Chinese Communist Party, receives Kenji Miyamoto, General Secretary of the Japanese Communist Party, who visited Guangzhou in January 1965.

Following reunification, Miyamoto's leadership of the party was firmly established at the 7th Party Congress in 1958, but the party continued to be influenced by the CCP until 1966. Serious conflicts arose between the Soviet Union and the People's Republic of China over their assessments of the course of Khrushchev's leadership of the CPSU, which began after Stalin's death in 1953. Notably, in 1961, the 22nd Congress of the CPSU criticized Albania for its pro-Chinese communist stance as "Stalinist", and Zhou Enlai responded by refuting this, leading to a sudden escalation of the Sino-Soviet conflict. The Chinese and Soviet Communist Parties pressured Communist parties around the world to clarify which side they would take. The JCP was troubled by the decision and remained silent for some time, but due to pressure from the Chinese faction within the Party, it decided to discuss the issue at the 5th Plenary Meeting of the Central Committee in 1963. Three different opinions were expressed: support the Soviet Union, support China, or non-intervention, but in the end, Miyamoto voted for "neutrality leaning toward China".

In August of that same year, the USSR, the United States, and the United Kingdom signed the Partial Nuclear Test Ban Treaty (PTBT), but the CCP strongly opposed it, considering it an attempt by the three countries to monopolize nuclear weapons and prevent China from developing nuclear weapons. A violent confrontation broke out at the conference, and Zhu Ziqi, the Chinese representative, threw a fan at Zhukov, the Soviet representative. While the Japanese Socialist Party supported the PTBT, the JCP opposed it, adopting a position closer to the CCP. From that moment on, Gensuikyō split into a Socialist Party faction and a Communist Party faction.

Noticing that the JCP was becoming increasingly pro-China and anti-Soviet, the CPSU sent three organizers from its secretariat to Japan in January 1964 in an attempt to undermine the JCP from within. In response, the JCP sent a delegation led by Hakamada Satomi to Moscow in February for negotiations, but the two sides ended up parting on bad terms. Upon his return in March, he stopped in Beijing and was warmly received by the CCP as a "hero of the anti-revisionist struggle." As a result of these incidents, the JCP's pro-China stance became increasingly decisive. In May 1964, at a plenary session of the House of Representatives, while Soviet First Vice Premier Mikoyan was visiting Japan and observing from the gallery, Yoshio Shiga, a pro-Soviet supporter, cast a blank vote (in favor) on the ratification of the PTBT, in opposition to official party policy. In the House of Councillors, Suzuki Ichizo also voted in favor. Upon hearing this news, Miyamoto suddenly returned from China, and at the 8th Plenary Meeting of the Central Committee, held on May 21, 1964, both men were expelled from the party. Furthermore, on September 25, Kamiyama Shigeo and Nakano Shigeharu of the same pro-Soviet faction were also expelled from the party, effectively ending the pro-Soviet faction. As a result, by the time the 9th Party Congress was held in November, the JCP's pro-Chinese Communist Party stance had become even clearer.

=== 1966 breakup ===
In February 1966, the Central Committee of the JCP decided to send a large delegation to meet with the Communist and Workers' Parties of Vietnam, China, and Korea in the hope of forming an international united front against the invasion of Vietnam. The group traveled from Wakamatsu Port in Fukuoka on a Chinese cargo ship to Shanghai on February 9 and, after preliminary talks there, arrived in Hanoi on February 17. They stayed in Hanoi for 10 days, signed a joint communiqué, and arrived in Beijing on February 28. They stayed in Beijing for a week and met with their Chinese counterparts four times, but there was a wide gap between the two sides' positions—whether to advocate an "international united front against US aggression in Vietnam" or an "anti-American and anti-Soviet united front"—and the delegation proceeded to Korea without reaching a joint communiqué. The plan was to arrive in Pyongyang on March 11, issue a joint statement on the 21st, and then return home via Beijing the same day, but the Chinese side proposed issuing a joint communiqué instead. At the meeting, the Chinese side proposed to criticize the USSR explicitly and directly, but the JCP disagreed and instead summarized the points of agreement between the two sides in a 3,000-character communiqué. The delegation was scheduled to visit Mao in Shanghai to finally approve the communiqué, but Miyamoto and others believed the meeting was a mere formality and that the communiqué would be approved as is. However, Mao, who welcomed Miyamoto and his companions, criticized the communiqué for its weakness, and it was not issued. Mao said, "Let's pretend this meeting never happened," and Miyamoto and his companions returned to China.

After returning to Japan, Miyamoto convened the 4th meeting of the Central Committee on April 27–28. At the meeting, Miyamoto criticized Mao, saying, "Mao has grown old and senile. Moreover, he has become arrogant and isolated even within the party." From then on, in anticipation of the 10th Party Congress, the Party adopted a distinctly anti-China stance. Criticism of the "ultra-left adventurism of the Mao faction" began appearing in the Akahata newspaper, and between 1966 and 1967, more than 30 mid-ranking members of the China faction, including Ryuji Nishizawa, were expelled. The CCP labeled Miyamoto a "revisionist" and began criticizing the JCP as a "Miyamoto's revisionist group". In October 1966, the Japan-China Friendship Association split into pro-JCP and non-JCP factions, the latter of which formed the "Japan-China Friendship Association (Orthodox) Headquarters." Later, the Japan-Asia-Africa Solidarity Committee also split into pro-JCP and non-JCP factions. The All-Japan Journalists' Conference and the New Japan Women's Association also faced conflicts between the two factions and separated. Tetsuzo Fuwa stated that the CCP has also used its ties to other political parties to isolate the JCP in Japanese political circles and cause internal divisions.

The Zenrin Student Residence in Bunkyo, Tokyo, was built as a dormitory for Chinese students studying in Manchukuo by the Manchukuo Japanese Student Guidance Association, established in 1935 following a donation from Puyi. Following Japan's defeat in the war, ownership was to be transferred to the Zenrin Student Residence Foundation, founded by former officials of the Ministry of Foreign Affairs. However, between 1952 and 1962, a dispute over ownership developed between a party claiming the residence was Chinese property, and between Chinese residents and students in Japan. In February 1962, an agreement was reached recognizing the foundation's right to manage the residence and agreeing that it would be used exclusively as a Chinese student residence and a Chinese cultural center. Taking advantage of this opportunity, all residents unconnected to the Japan-China friendship movement were forced to move out, and the Japan-China Friendship Association, to coordinate the Japan-China friendship movement, set up an office inside the hall. However, after the association's dissolution, the Japan-China Friendship Association, which remained in the hall, strengthened its stance on hindering exchanges with China. In response, Chinese dormitory residents posted newspapers on the walls arguing that the Japan-China Friendship Association, which did not participate in Japan-China friendship activities, was a fake Japan-China Friendship Association and should leave the hall. On February 28, 1967, a Japan-China Friendship Association employee tore down the wall newspaper and entered the association's office, prompting the dormitory residents to protest there. 500 members of the Democratic Youth League and others surrounded the building, claiming that the JCP office had been attacked, and also brought weapons such as helmets and clubs into the office. On March 2, a group of people armed with helmets and clubs left the Japan-China Friendship Association office and, claiming self-defense, attacked students in the nearby dormitory with clubs, resulting in the bloody Zenrin Student Hall Incident, in which seven Chinese students and Japanese sympathizers were injured.

In August of that same year, the Beijing Airport Incident occurred, when two members of the JCP were assaulted by a group of Red Guards and Japanese exchange students as they attempted to leave Beijing. These incidents led to an all-out confrontation between the JCP and the CCP.

=== After 1966 ===
When Miyamoto sent a delegation to create an international united front against the invasion of Vietnam, China opposed including the Soviet Union in the united front, causing the CCP to thwart an international joint declaration between the parties, which eventually led to a breakdown in relations between the JCP and the CCP. In 1966, as the United States intensified its military attacks against North Vietnam, China argued that "invading Vietnam would lead to invading China" and supported the "anti-American struggle and Vietnam's struggle for national independence." The United States, perceiving China as a threat due to its attitude, sought to strengthen cooperation between Japan, South Korea, and Taiwan and reinforce its containment of China. At the same time, the Sino-Soviet conflict escalated, and disputes and conflicts between the Communist Parties of both countries gradually escalated into a conflict between nations. China was forced into a situation where it was at risk of attack by the two superpowers, the US and the USSR. To overcome this situation, Mao launched the Cultural Revolution to reorganize and strengthen the internal system. At a time when China was facing such a critical situation, a conflict arose between the Japanese and Chinese Communist Parties, leading the JCP to completely cut off all contact with China. The Sino-Soviet conflict was becoming an international one, and the JCP leadership was well aware of the situation. Looking at the JCP's subsequent actions, it appears that Miyamoto and others were aware that their proposal to build an "international united front against the invasion of Vietnam" that would include the USSR could provoke a negative reaction from the Chinese, so they appear to have sent the delegation with the intention of cutting ties with the CCP if such a conflict arose. At the time, the JCP was seeking to change its policy regarding conflicts over internal affairs and was consolidating a more moderate and pragmatic stance that it could not agree with the hard line adopted by the CCP in the 1960s. A power struggle had long been underway within the party to eliminate older party members who held opinions different from those of General Secretary Miyamoto. It is through these struggles that Miyamoto consolidated his power and gave rise to the current form of the Japanese Communist Party.

In his notes, Miyamoto wrote that he would await the "judgment of history" regarding political differences and other issues. However, the JCP brought its conflict with the CCP into the Japan-China friendship movement and, through party members who were also members of friendship organizations, strengthened its stance of denying and obstructing exchanges with China. The reason the JCP had so many members in friendly non-Party organizations, including the Japan-China Friendship Association, was because the Party sought to establish cells loyal to Miyamoto within these organizations and sought to engage them in activities aimed at strengthening the JCP's influence in the Sino-Japanese friendship movement. For example, following the success of the Great Japan-China Youth Friendship Exchange in 1965, a second Japan-China Youth Friendship Exchange was scheduled for 1966. Not only did the JCP choose not to participate, but organizations following its instructions engaged in disruptive activities to prevent participation. The Sato Cabinet took advantage of this internal conflict and decided to implement a policy of not allowing the issuance of passports. Furthermore, from November to December 1966, a China Economic and Trade Exposition, sponsored by trade organizations from Japan and China, was to be held in Kitakyushu and Nagoya. On the Japanese side, friendly organizations such as the Japan-China Friendship Association were making preparations. However, the JCP Central Committee decided not to participate in the exposition and, through party members belonging to related organizations, engaged in disruptive activities, such as preventing the expansion of the exposition and the display and sale of Chinese books, including the Selected Works of Mao Zedong, on the grounds. These actions by the JCP were described as "anti-China" and generated confusion within both the Japanese communist movement and the Sino-Japanese friendship movement. The Japan-China friendship movement was not the exclusive domain of a particular political party, but a mass movement carried out by people from all walks of life in Japan, including those who were non-political or alien to communism or socialism. There is criticism that the JCP's attitude at the time was problematic, as it prioritized party policy over the domestic political issue of reestablishing diplomatic relations between Japan and China.

=== Post-breakup period ===
Faced with the CCP's criticism, interference in internal affairs, and factionalism, Miyamoto resolved to break ties with the party. From then on, the JCP adopted a banner of "autonomy and independence", "neither Soviet nor Chinese," to distance itself from the communist parties of other countries. However, by making enemies not only of the CPSU but also of the CCP, the JCP found itself almost completely isolated within the international communist movement. The international communist movement itself was divided into several factions, including the Soviet faction, the Chinese faction, and the Czech faction, and its unity was in a state of virtual collapse. In 1968, taking advantage of the rift between the JCP and the CCP, the CPSU sent a delegation led by Suslov to the JCP headquarters in Yoyogi in an attempt to repair relations with the JCP and return the Japanese communists to the pro-Soviet orbit, something for which it enlisted the support of figures such as Shiga and other members of the Voice of Japan group. Although the Japanese and Soviet Communist Parties somewhat improved their relations and issued a joint communiqué, the JCP decided not to abandon the new line of "self-reliance and independence" and maintained its distance from Moscow. When the Warsaw Pact invaded Czechoslovakia in the same year, the JCP criticized the USSR for "a flagrant violation of the principle of non-interference in the internal affairs of fraternal parties." As a result, the restoration of relations between the Communist Party of the Soviet Union and the Communist Party of Japan was short-lived. During this period, the JCP was sometimes viewed by its leftist detractors as "more right-wing than the anti-communist Democratic Socialist Party" due to its fierce opposition to the USSR and China. On the other hand, the JCP strengthened friendly relations with the Italian Communist Party and other Eurocommunist parties and, in turn, increased its influence in national politics as a parliamentary party, transforming it into a completely different party from the radical CCP, which continued the Cultural Revolution.

Meanwhile, China, amid rising military tensions with the United States due to the escalating Vietnam War and the Sino-Soviet border conflict that culminated in a military confrontation in 1969, relations with Tokyo became a dangerous factor threatening China's political status and, in some cases, their lives. Sino-Japanese relations grew much more hostile and distrustful by the late 1960s. Dong Biwu maintained his authority as one of the few CCP members who had remained there since its founding, and Zhou Enlai, who had studied in Japan, continued to enjoy Mao's firm trust in administrative matters as Premier of the State Council. However, others, such as Liao Chengzhi, Chairman of the China-Japan Friendship Association, who was born in Tokyo and spent his childhood in Japan, despite having criticized the JCP, did not escape disgrace, being considered by Mao as "pro-Japanese." Subsequently, Mao's foreign policy took a radical turn with the visit of US President Richard Nixon to China in 1972, and in October of that year, Prime Minister Kakuei Tanaka also visited China. In Beijing, Tanaka and Zhou issued a joint statement, which achieved the normalization of diplomatic relations between Japan and China. Although Liao Chengzhi, who served as interpreter, was reinstated in power, relations between the Japanese and Chinese Communist Parties did not improve. The dialogue diplomacy that paved the way for the restoration of diplomatic relations was carried out by the Japan Socialist Party, which as a whole enjoyed friendly relations with the CCP due in part to the influence of the pro-China group on the party's left wing, and by the Komeito, which, despite its right-wing line, had Sinophile tendencies and whose chairman, Yoshikatsu Takeiri, had received a personal letter from Zhou in Beijing three months before Tanaka's visit. With the deaths of Zhou and Mao in 1976, the CCP ended the Cultural Revolution and removed Hua Guofeng as Chairman of the Central Committee of the Chinese Communist Party, ushering in a system in which Deng Xiaoping, who adopted the same pragmatic and modernizing approach as Zhou, emerged as the new supreme leader. However, the conflict between the CCP and the JCP continued, and when Japanese parliamentary delegations visited China, the JCP members were rejected by the Chinese side. However, unlike the Liberal Democratic Party (LDP), which had a group within the party that still strongly resisted the normalization of diplomatic relations between Japan and China and which maintained close ties with Taiwan even after normalization, there was no possibility for the JCP to have friendly relations with Chiang Kai-shek, who advocated the most violent anti-communism, or with Taiwan in general, where martial law continued and KMT one-party rule continued even after his death in 1975. Ultimately, the JCP was unable to exert any real influence on China issues, and although it harshly criticized the CCP for years, it continued to support the party's "One China" principle, which aims for unification with Taiwan under the People's Republic. In 1978, Prime Minister Takeo Fukuda signed the Japan-China Treaty of Peace and Friendship. In a debate at the plenary session of the House of Councillors on October 18, 1978, JCP member Hiroshi Tachiki criticized China for "attempting to impose a policy of armed struggle on Japanese people's movements for the past decade or so and for engaging in acts of great-power hegemonism." He then argued for ratification on behalf of the JCP, arguing that the Japanese government had confirmed that China's refusal to allow members of its own party to visit China, as well as its support for pro-China, anti-JCP New Left groups in Japan, constituted interference in Japan's internal affairs and thus fell within the hegemonism opposed by the treaty.

When the Sino-Vietnamese War broke out in February 1979, the JCP, which had still maintained friendly relations with the Communist Party of Vietnam since the visit of the Miyamoto delegation in 1966, issued a statement urging China to immediately cease its acts of aggression against Vietnam. It declared the Sino-Vietnamese War an act of Chinese aggression and criticized China's military actions as being "completely unrelated to the cause of socialism." In March, Takano Isao, the Hanoi correspondent for the Akahata newspaper, was shot and killed by the People's Liberation Army while covering the Sino-Vietnamese War. Tadao Nirasawa, editor-in-chief of the Akahata newspaper, issued a statement saying: "We deeply regret the death of special correspondent Takano, who adhered to fair and truthful coverage, and once again we strongly condemn China's invasion of Vietnam."

The JCP makes the following statement regarding the trend toward improving relations between the Communist Parties of Japan and China: Since the late 1970s, the CCP has gradually restored its interference in the internal affairs of Communist Parties around the world, as it did during the Cultural Revolution, with ambiguous theories such as "everything is the same" and "future-oriented." In 1985, a Chinese delegation proposed a meeting with the JCP to discuss and perhaps repair relations. However, the content of the proposal letter was ambiguous and placed the blame largely on the JCP for the deterioration of relations, so Miyamoto rejected the CCP's proposal, accusing them of being unwilling to admit any wrongdoing and of failing to apologize. In 1989, following the Tiananmen Square incident, relations between the two parties deteriorated again after the JCP denounced the incident as "an outrage that cannot be overlooked internationally in the light of the cause of socialism" and declared that "we strongly and angrily condemn this unspeakable outrage."

=== Repairing relations ===
After Deng's death in 1997, the CCP underwent further reforms under its new General Secretary, Jiang Zemin. The new party leadership sent an unofficial statement to the JCP, published in The Asahi Shimbun, expressing regret for having previously violated the principle of non-interference in internal affairs and his interest in repairing relations. That same year, Miyamoto, who had been at odds with China for over thirty years, resigned from the party, remaining only as honorary chairman of the JCP, while Tetsuzo Fuwa became the new party leader. The fact that both parties underwent a leadership change at a time when relations between the two were at an impasse allowed for progress toward repairing relations. The two sides met in Beijing in June 1998 and reached an agreement to restore relations. The agreement document stated:

The Chinese side has seriously reviewed and made corrections to the way in which the two sides, influenced by the international environment of the 1960s and China's 'Cultural Revolution,' had taken actions in their relations that were inconsistent with the Four Principles for Interparty Relations, particularly the principle of non-interference in each other's internal affairs. The Japanese side positively evaluated the Chinese side's sincere attitude. The draft law included a clause in which the Chinese Communist Party admitted its wrongdoing in interfering with the Japanese Communist Party during the Cultural Revolution.

Once relations were reestablished, theoretical exchanges between the two sides resumed. As a result of the improved relations and dialogue with the CCP, in the 2004 revision of the Japanese Communist Party Platform, then-President Tetsuzo Fuwa included the following statement: "What is important today is that in several countries that have abandoned capitalism, although they still have unresolved political and economic issues, new quests to advance toward socialism have begun, such as efforts to achieve socialism through a market economy. This development in a large country with a population of over 1.3 billion is destined to become a major milestone in world history in the 21st century." Although the JCP gave a broadly positive assessment of the "socialist market economy" advocated by the CCP as a "new pursuit of socialism," Fukawa also stated that he did not support everything that was happening in China, with the caveat that "there are still unresolved political and economic issues." Kazuo Shii, the party chairman, made it clear that he had included a disclaimer because China's problems with democracy and human rights could not be overlooked even at the stage of normalizing relations. Regarding the criteria the JCP used to evaluate the "New Pursuit of Socialism," Shii said that because evaluating the economic system could "amount to interference in internal affairs," the party has adopted the position of evaluating the CCP based on "whether the leadership is serious and sincere about the cause of socialism" and its external relations: "If the leadership is serious and sincere about the cause of socialism, it will be able to overcome various difficulties and move forward. If that were to disappear, there would be no guarantee of moving forward," he said. In light of this standard, the JCP determined that the Chinese leadership had recognized the error of interfering in JCP affairs and had taken steps to make it known to the public through television and newspapers, which demonstrated that the Chinese leadership was "serious and sincere in its commitment to the cause of socialism." Unlike Fuwa, Shii repeatedly stated that he was "neither optimistic nor inflexible" about China's future, and from this standpoint the JCP adopted the policy of "upholding the principle of non-interference in internal affairs, while conveying our views on issues of an international nature from time to time."

From this perspective, the JCP has frequently criticized the CCP in its newspapers and other media for its hardline stance on territorial issues such as the Senkaku Islands and the Spratly Islands, as well as for its authoritarian domestic policies that run counter to international human rights agreements, such as the Tibetan issue, the Uyghur issue, and the suppression of pro-democracy protests in Hong Kong. In a resolution passed at the 26th Party Congress in January 2014, the JCP expressed its first cautionary view on China's future since the restoration of relations between the two parties, stating: "There will be some exploration, but there will also likely be failures and trial and error. There is a risk of a return to hegemony and chaos among the great powers. If such a grave mistake is made, there is even the danger of permanently deviating from the path to socialism. We hope that a country that aspires to socialism will never allow the fatal mistake of the former Soviet Union to be repeated."

=== New breakup ===
Kazuo Shii stated, "It was our experience at the ICAPP, held in Kuala Lumpur, Malaysia, in September 2016, that made us decide that our party had no choice but to decisively change its view of China." According to Shii, who attended the conference as the head of the JCP delegation, events unfolded as follows: The JCP delegation proposed an amendment to the General Assembly Declaration to include a statement saying, "We demand the early start of international negotiations on a nuclear weapons prohibition treaty," a statement that has also been included in previous General Assembly declarations. However, the CCP delegation strongly opposed it, so Yasuo Ogata, JCP Vice President and deputy head of the delegation, asked the CCP delegation to hold talks. At the meeting, Ogata asked, "China also supported this at the last two ICAPP General Assemblies, and it was passed unanimously. What's the problem?" However, the CCP delegation responded, "We don't know what happened in the past. Including that phrase will allow Japan, an aggressor country, to be promoted as if it were a victim country." Ogata retorted, "This amendment mentions nothing about Japan's exposure to the atomic bomb or the damage it caused. It is presented as an international issue of great importance that affects all of humanity." However, the Chinese side responded, "We do not wish to discuss this issue. We oppose the amendment. We reject the proposal," reiterating their opposition without giving reasons and ending the meeting. The JCP delegation requested another meeting, during which Ogata asked again, "China has always upheld a nuclear weapons ban treaty, so why are you taking an attitude against it?" The Chinese side responded by criticizing Ogata, saying, "You are hegemonic. You are imposing your views on others." Ogata retorted, "That's not true. We are having a discussion. If this is imposed on us, we cannot have a discussion." The Chinese side also hurled derogatory remarks at him, calling him "rude." Shii said that, regarding the Chinese delegation's attitude, "I was forced to seriously analyze the gravity of the situation and ask myself where the reflection that took place when relations between the two parties were normalized in 1998 had gone."

When the JCP subsequently proposed an amendment to the Declaration Drafting Committee, the CCP delegation raised no objections, and the amendment was unanimously adopted and included in the draft Declaration of the General Assembly on the final day of the meeting. However, just before the Declaration was adopted, the CCP delegation, following instructions from Beijing, requested the deletion of this section, and the declaration was subsequently dropped. The JCP delegation reacted negatively to what it considered an authoritarian action by the CCP to unilaterally overturn a decision unanimously made by the Declaration Drafting Committee. The JCP delegation expressed partial reservations and criticized the Chinese delegation, stating: "The behavior of a delegation that suddenly requested changes to the final draft of the Declaration just before its adoption is abnormal and extremely tyrannical. We strongly protest that this delegation has caused a situation seriously contrary to the democratic development of the ICAPP conference."

At its 27th Party Congress, held in January 2017, the JCP specifically criticized China for its "mistakes as a new great imperialist power" accusing it of promoting a nuclear arms race, attempting to change the status quo by force in the East and the South China Sea, trampling on the democratic conduct of international conferences, and having an attitude inconsistent with the principles upheld by the Japanese party. According to Shii, just before the party convention, Cheng Yonghua, then ambassador to China, requested a meeting with Shii and, during the meeting, asked that the reference to "new great power ideology and hegemony" be removed. However, Shii rejected the request and, while explaining why the provision had been included, asked for it to be corrected. He also asked, "Does the Central Committee of the Chinese Communist Party approve or disapprove of the behavior of the Chinese Communist Party delegation at the International Conference of Asian Political Parties? Please consult with your country of origin and give us a response." Cheng promised to convey this to the Chinese government, but reportedly has not received a response since. As a result, the JCP stated that it had concluded that "the imperialist behavior exhibited by the CCP delegation in Kuala Lumpur should be seen as a problem for the CCP Central Committee itself" and that "it is impossible to find in it any 'sincerity or real commitment to the socialist cause." During the meeting, Cheng also said, "I would like you to resolve your differences through internal debates rather than making them public," and "That will only please our enemies and the right wing." Shii responded, "The party has the independent right to publicly express its stance on international affairs, and if there are objections, you can publicly refute them." He also added, "Saying that 'the enemy and the right wing will be pleased' is an extremely disrespectful statement toward our party, which is seriously fighting against the Abe government's 'building a nation capable of going to war.' I would like you to seriously consider the extent to which China's chauvinistic and imperialist behavior is being used as an excuse for the Abe government to push through security legislation or war legislation, and to what extent this harms the interests of Japanese movements."

At the 8th Plenary Session of the Japanese Communist Party Central Committee in 2019, a proposal was made to delete a sentence from the party platform that described China as "a country where a new pursuit of socialism has begun," on the grounds that it had deviated from the principles and ideals of socialism. The party platform was officially revised at the 28th Party Congress on January 18, 2020, and the following statement was added, without naming any countries but with China and Russia in mind: "The growing chaos among major powers and the hegemony of some of them represents a setback for world peace and progress. It is deeply worrying that the struggle for hegemony between the United States and other emerging powers is intensifying, creating new tensions in the world and the region."

In the "Central Committee Report on the Proposal for Partial Revision of the Platform" presented by Shii at the conference, the reasons why the JCP believes there is no basis for claiming that China is a country that "has begun a new pursuit of socialism" were stated: First, positions against the abolition of nuclear weapons have become even more serious; second, hegemonic actions in the East China Sea and the South China Sea have become more aggressive; third, no attitude has been taken to correct the tyrannical behavior that tramples on democratic management at international conferences and the actions that run counter to the principles upheld by both Japan and China; and fourth, human rights violations have become more serious in Hong Kong, the Xinjiang Uyghur Autonomous Region, and other places. The Shii report also stated that the type of China's economic system is an internal matter and that the party will not make its judgment public; that researchers and others are free to express their personal opinions; that relations with the CCP will be maintained as a relationship between a Japanese political party and China's ruling party; and that efforts to cooperate as needed for the sake of peace and stability in the region will continue. However, Shii made it clear that the Japanese and Chinese Communist Parties "do not share any common political or ideological stance" and that "I believe that China's attitude toward nuclear weapons, its hegemonic actions, and its human rights violations are actions unworthy of the name of the Communist Party."

Since revising its platform, the JCP has intensified its criticism of China. The JCP has repeatedly protested against the Chinese government for its crackdown on the 2019–2020 Hong Kong protests, the implementation of the Hong Kong National Security Law, and the Senkaku Islands issue. Although China's public relations department has not publicly responded to the Japanese communists' criticism, when the CCP asked Japan's ruling and opposition parties to submit congratulatory speeches at the commemoration ceremony for the centennial of the founding of the CCP, the JCP was excluded. On the occasion of the centennial, the JCP issued a new statement against China, recalling that: "China's hegemonic actions in the East China Sea and the South China Sea, and its human rights violations in Hong Kong and Xinjiang, have nothing to do with socialism and are not worthy of the name of the Communist Party." On December 13, 2021, Shii made a statement regarding the Beijing Winter Olympics, stating that "sending government representatives to the Games' opening and closing ceremonies could be seen as tacit approval of China's human rights oppression," and expressed his intention to call on the Japanese government to implement a diplomatic boycott by not sending a government representative to the Games.

=== Reconciliation ===
In 2023, due to Prime Minister Fumio Kishida's policies towards China and worries about the deterioration of the relationship between the two nations, the JCP started reconciling with the CCP. On March 30, 2023, amid deteriorating relations between Japan and China, the JCP published an article under Shii's name on its official website titled "For Positive Progress in Japan-China Relations: Proposals from the Japanese Communist Party," calling for a resolution of the issues between the two countries through dialogue. On May 4, 2023, Shii met with the Chinese ambassador to Japan Wu Jianghao, presenting him with a "three-point proposal" to improve the relationship, The recommendations are:

1. to faithfully implement the 2008 Japan-China Joint Communiqué, which states that both Japan and China "will not pose a threat to each other," and not to take any action that goes against this statement;
2. to seek a solution to the Senkaku Islands issue through "dialogue and consultation," based on the "four-point agreement" reached by the Japanese and Chinese governments in 2014; and
3. to promote regional cooperation for peace in East Asia, with the "ASEAN Indo-Pacific Initiative (AOIP)" proposed by the Association of Southeast Asian Nations (ASEAN) as a common goal

Wu said the points "will be used as a reference for China's policy toward Japan". Shii had met with Kishida in March to present the same proposal, which Kishida supported. Shii told Wu that "We have made the proposal acceptable to both governments and effective in making a positive breakthrough in Japan-China relations". Regarding the CCP and JCP relationship, Shii said that "There are various differences of opinion, and our position has not changed, but we were unable to include all of them in the proposal". Wu said China appreciates JCP's worries about the deterioation of the relationship, saying "Overall, the recommendations share many of the same positions as the Chinese government".

== See also ==
- Relations between Japanese revolutionaries, the Comintern and the Soviet Union
- Sino-Soviet split
