= Kenji Miyamoto =

Kenji Miyamoto may refer to:

- Kenji Miyamoto (politician) (1908–2007), Japanese politician
- Kenji Miyamoto (figure skater) (born 1978), Japanese retired ice dancer
