= Noriko Narushima =

Japanese politician (1898-1976)

- 成島 憲子
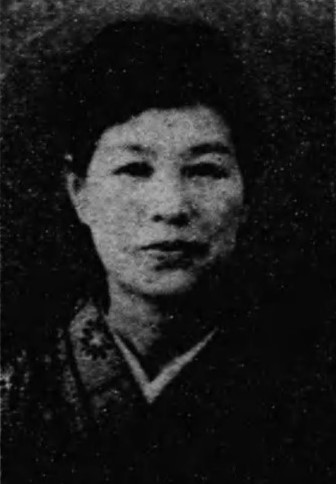

Member of the House of Representatives
- In office 25 April 1947 – 23 December 1948
- Preceded by: Constituency established
- Succeeded by: Tōru Sakuma
- Constituency: Chiba 1st

Personal details
- Born: 27 July 1898 Tokyo City, Tokyo, Japan
- Died: 4 January 1976 (aged 77)
- Party: Democratic

Noriko Narushima (成島 憲子, Narushima Noriko; 27 July 1898 – 4 January 1976) was a Japanese politician and women's right activist. Originally an active leader in the women's liberation movement in Japan, she became a member of the House of Representatives after her husband Isamu Narushima was purged as part of the occupation of Japan, serving from 1947 until 1949.

== Biography ==
Noriko Narushima was born on 27 July 1898 in Tokyo City. She graduated from Taipei First Girls' High School in 1916. She was an active leader in the women's liberation movement in Japan and served as president of the Higashi-Katsushika District chapter of the Dai Nippon fujinkai.

After her husband, member of the House of Representatives Isamu Narushima, was purged during the occupation of Japan, she ran in the 1947 Japanese general election as one of Chiba 1st district's five Democratic Party candidates, and she was elected to the seat, getting the most votes out of any candidate. During her time as a legislator, she became deputy director of the party's women's division.

In the 1949 Japanese general election, she ranked seventh place in her district and was not re-elected. She died on 4 January 1976.
