= Hideo Usui =

Japanese politician (born 1939)

- 臼井 日出男
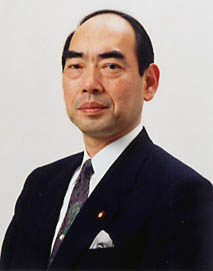
- Official portrait, 1999

Minister of Justice
- In office 5 October 1999 – 4 July 2000
- Prime Minister: Keizō Obuchi; Yoshirō Mori
- Preceded by: Takao Jinnouchi
- Succeeded by: Okiharu Yasuoka

Director-General of the Japan Defense Agency
- In office 11 January 1996 – 7 November 1996
- Prime Minister: Ryutaro Hashimoto
- Preceded by: Seishirō Etō
- Succeeded by: Fumio Kyūma

Member of the House of Representatives
- In office 11 September 2005 – 21 July 2009
- Preceded by: Kaname Tajima
- Succeeded by: Kaname Tajima
- Constituency: Chiba 1st
- In office 22 June 1980 – 10 October 2003
- Preceded by: Kihara Minoru
- Succeeded by: Kaname Tajima
- Constituency: Former Chiba 1st (1980–1996); Chiba 1st (1996–2003)

Personal details
- Born: 3 January 1939 (age 87) Chiba City, Chiba, Japan
- Party: Liberal Democratic
- Children: Shoichi Usui
- Parent: Sōichi Usui (father)
- Education: Chuo University

Hideo Usui (臼井 日出男, Usui Hideo; born 3 January 1939) is a retired Japanese politician of the Liberal Democratic Party, who served as a member of the House of Representatives, the lower house of the National Diet. He served as Minister of Justice from 1999 to 2000.

== Career ==
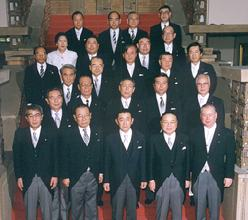
Usui with members of First Hashimoto Cabinet (at the Prime Minister's Official Residence on January 11, 1996)

A native of Chiba city and a graduate of Chuo University, he was elected for the first time in 1980 after an unsuccessful run in 1979. He served until losing his seat in the 2003 general election. He regained the seat in the 2005 general election, and retired after the 2009 general election. In 1996 he served as Director General of the Japan Defense Agency.

== Personal life ==
His eldest son, Shoichi Usui, is also a politician. He was elected to the House of Councillors in 2022, representing the Chiba at-large district.

House of Representatives (Japan)
Preceded by Kazuo Torii; Ihei Shiseki; Mutsuo Shibata; Minoru Kihara	Representative for Chiba 1st district 1980–1996; Served alongside: Kazuo Eguchi, Kazuo Torii, Kazuo Shii, Yoshihiko Noda, Mutsuo Shibata, Masayuki Okajima, ...	District eliminated
New district	Representative for Chiba 1st district (single-member); 1996–2003	Succeeded by Kaname Tajima
Preceded by Kaname Tajima	Representative for Chiba 1st district (single-member); 2005–2009	Succeeded by Kaname Tajima
Preceded by Hajime Funada	Chair, Lower House Committee on Education; 1991	Succeeded by Kosuke Ito
Preceded by Kiyoshi Ozawa	Chair, Lower House Committee on Science and Technology; 1993–1994	Succeeded by Matsusho Miyazato
Political offices
Preceded by Seishiro Etō	Head of the Japan Defense Agency; 1996	Succeeded by Fumio Kyūma
Preceded by Takao Jinnouchi	Minister of Justice; 1999–2000	Succeeded by Okiharu Yasuoka
Other offices
Preceded by Masajuro Shiokawa	President of the Liberal National Congress; 2015–present	Incumbent
