= Tomoko Tamura =

Japanese politician (born 1965)

- 田村 智子
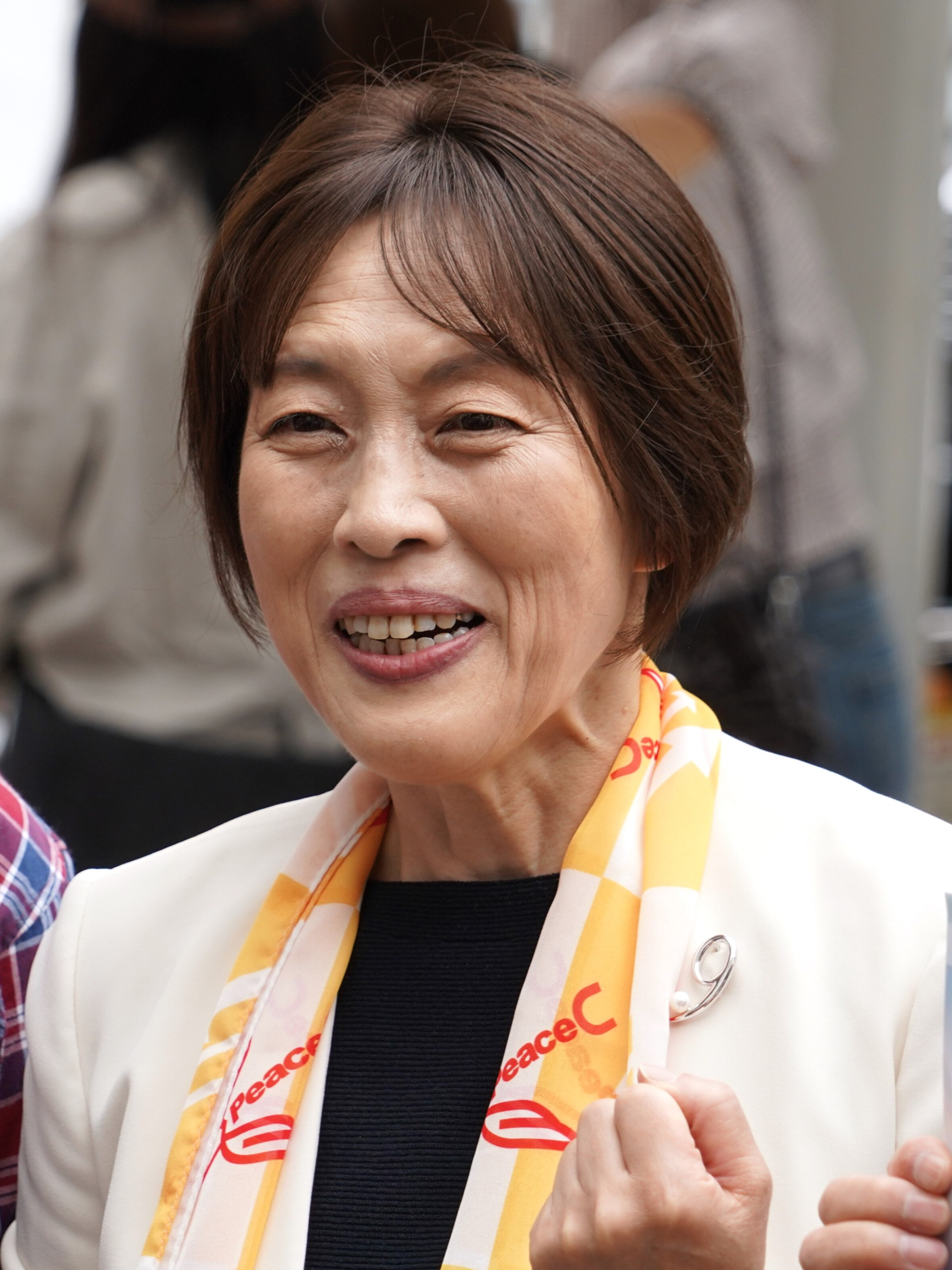
- Tamura in 2024

Chairwoman of the Japanese Communist Party
- Incumbent
- Assumed office 18 January 2024
- Preceded by: Kazuo Shii

Member of the House of Representatives
- Incumbent
- Assumed office 1 November 2024
- Constituency: Tokyo PR

Member of the House of Councillors
- In office 26 July 2010 – 15 October 2024
- Preceded by: Multi-member district
- Succeeded by: Mikishi Daimon
- Constituency: National PR

Personal details
- Born: Tomoko Yamazaki; 4 July 1965 (age 61) Komoro, Nagano, Japan
- Party: Communist (since 1985)
- Children: 2
- Education: Waseda University

Tomoko Tamura (田村 智子, Tamura Tomoko; née Yamazaki, born 4 July 1965) is a Japanese politician and chairwoman of the Japanese Communist Party. She succeeded Kazuo Shii in 2024. She was a member of the House of Councillors from 2010 to 2024.

== Early life ==
Tamura was born on 4 July 1965, in Komoro, Nagano Prefecture, to parents who owned a stationery shop. While attending Waseda University, a series of protests and strikes against an increase in tuition led her to join the Democratic Youth League of Japan.

== Political career ==
After Tamura graduated, she took full-time employment with the Democratic Youth League of Japan, organizing anti-war protests and pro-peace rallies. From 1995, she had switched to the main Japanese Communist Party and worked as the secretary and deputy secretary respectively for House of Representative members Ikuko Ishii and Miyo Inoue. She ran unsuccessfully for the House of Councilors in 1998, 2001, and 2007, and for the House of Representatives in 2005.

=== Tenure ===
Tamura was first elected to the House of Councilors in the 2010 election, for the National party list block, and was reelected in 2016 and 2022. Before becoming the party's leader, she served as the vice chair of the executive committee and the chair of the policy committee. She criticized former Prime Minister Shinzo Abe's female cabinet picks, saying that they were performative instead of advancing women's empowerment. She also criticized Abe over his involvement in the cherry blossom scandal.

=== Chair ===
On 18 January 2024, she replaced Kazuo Shii as chair of the Japan Communist Party. She became the party's first female chair in history. Tamura was selected to replace Shii after he was caught in a scandal after expelling two members of the Japanese Communist Party who had called for the democratic election of the party's leadership by party members. Tamura's selection has been viewed by some as an attempt to repair the Communist Party's image in this scandal's wake.

Tamura stood for the October 2024 House of Representatives election as the top candidate on the Communist Party list for the Tokyo proportional representation block. She thus automatically lost her seat in the House of Councillors when the election was officially announced. The party had a lackluster showing, losing 2 of its 10 seats, with voices within the JCP beginning to question Tamura's leadership.

In the 2026 election the JCP did poorly, losing half of the seats that they held, with Tamura blaming the party's decline on there "not [being] enough time for our message to spread." The party ran on reducing the consumption tax to 5% before eventually abolishing it all together, and to tax the cash reserves of business. The JCP did not seek to join the Centrist Reform Alliance (CRA), despite having coordinated with the Constitutional Democratic Party in the prior election, due to the CRA's support for restarting nuclear power plants.

== Positions ==
=== Foreign policy ===
==== Taiwan ====
Various Chinese propaganda media, such as China Daily and China Central Television, have quoted Tamura as saying she is a staunch supporter of Chinese Unification, calling the matter an issue of Chinese "internal affairs" as she does not view Taiwan as an independent country and claiming that this support means popularity for war over Taiwan is low in Japan. In November 2025, after Prime Minister Sanae Takaichi stated that a Chinese invasion of Taiwan would pose "an existential crisis situation" implying that it would be justifiable self-defense for Japan to deploy the JSDF to Taiwan in such an event, Tamura called for Takaichi to retract her statement and said that the "Japanese government should be in the position of a peaceful solution" if there were an invasion.

==== Ukraine ====
Tamura condemned Russia's invasion of Ukraine criticizing Vladimir Putin's claim that the war was in self-defense, and also condemning his use of routine threats to deploy nuclear weapons in the conflict. She has called on the Diet to send humanitarian aid to Ukraine. However, she also denounced the government for sending bulletproof vests to Ukraine, noting that the JCP is opposed to the move, but that she supports it on a personal level which saw her criticized by the party's newspaper, Shimbun Akahata. Shortly after she made a statement saying she opposed sending the bulletproof vests to Ukraine. She also opposed a government proposal to send other non-lethal aid such as mine-clearing support to Ukraine, arguing that support for aid to Ukraine is just leverage for the government to militarize.

==== United States ====
Tamura is opposed to Japan's alliance to the United States arguing that Japan is a “vassal state.”

She has called the 2026 United States intervention in Venezuela a "declaration of a new colonial rule" and demanded the government condemn the act. Takaichi opted to neither endorse, nor condone, the action.

When Donald Trump endorsed Takaichi in the lead up to the 2026 election she called it an “unacceptable interference in domestic affairs.”

=== JSDF ===
Tamura opposes the expansion of the JSDF criticizing Sanae Takaichi for aiming for funding the JSDF with up to 2% of Japan's GDP. To this end she has also opposed arms expansions, as well as the instillation of missile systems on Okinawa. She has opposed measures that would allow Japan to export defensive weapons, such as missile interceptors.
