= Chairperson of the Japanese Communist Party =

Chairperson of the Executive Committee of the Central Committee of the Japanese Communist Party
- 日本共産党中央委員会幹部会委員長; Niho Kyōsantō Chūōiinkai Kanbu-kai Iin-chō
- Logo for the Japanese Communist Party

- Flag of the Japanese Communist Party

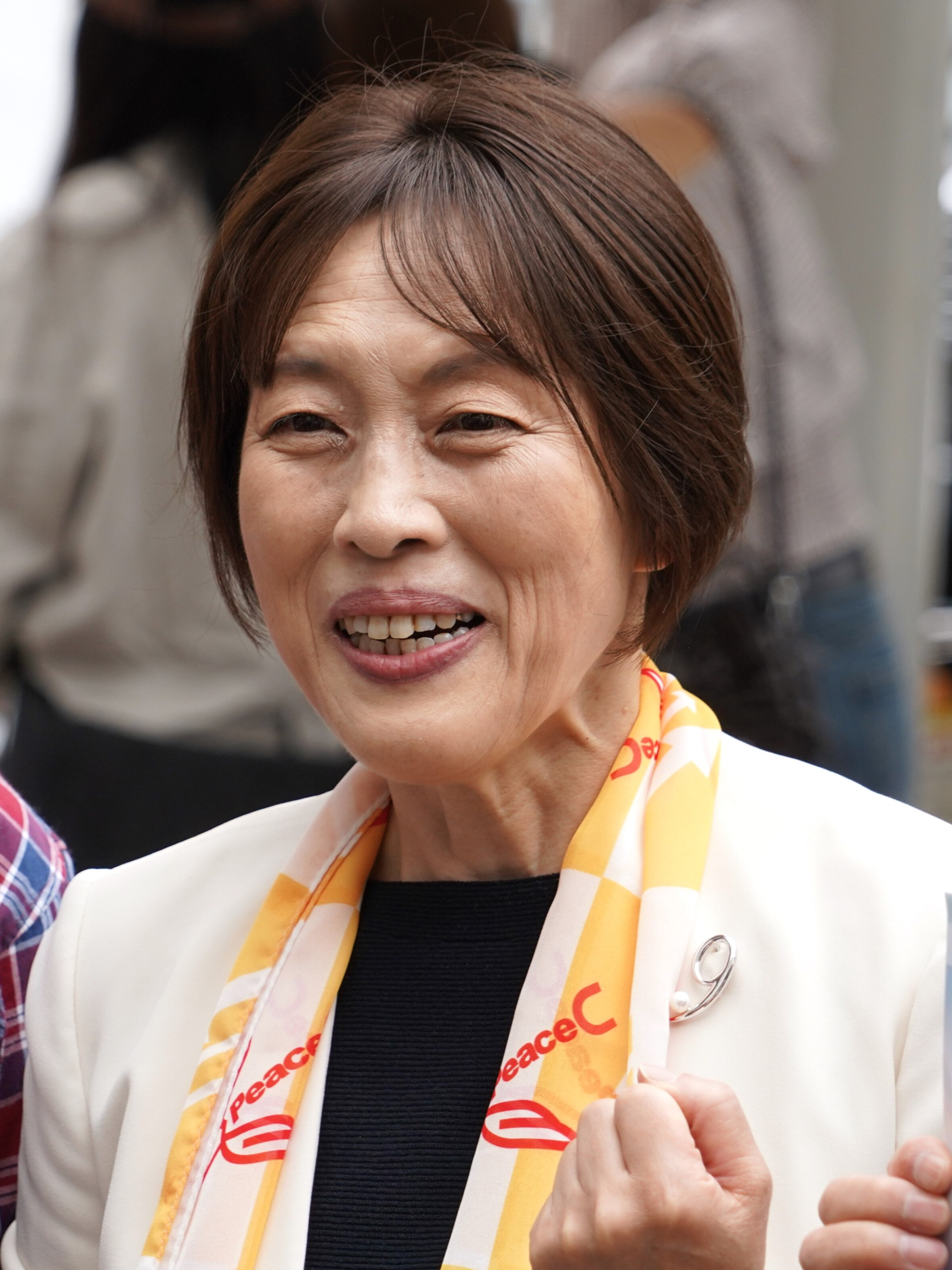
- Incumbent; Tomoko Tamura since 18 January 2024
- Executive Committee of the Central Committee of the Japanese Communist Party
- Type: Party leader
- Member of: Executive Committee of the Central Committee
- Appointer: Central Committee
- Term length: Two to three years
- Inaugural holder: Kenji Miyamoto
- Formation: 7 July 1970
- Deputy: Vice Chairpersons

The chairperson of the Japanese Communist Party (日本共産党委員長, Nihon kyōsantō Iin-chō) is the highest position within the Japanese Communist Party. The current chairperson is Tomoko Tamura, who took office on 18 January 2024.

== Elections ==
The chairperson is elected by the Central Committee of the Japanese Communist Party, which also elects other members of the executive committee including the vice-chairpersons, and the head of the secretariat.

== History ==
The Japanese Communist party was founded on 15 July 1922. The original leadership position of the party was the General Affairs Chief Secretary. The first General Affairs Chief Secretary was Arakawa Katsuzō.

The party was outlawed by the Japanese government in 1923, and was not refounded until 1945 after the end of World War II, and political reforms under the American Occupation rule. When the party was reformed, the leadership title was changed to General Secretary.

In 1970 the leadership title was changed once again, this time to Chairperson, which is the currently used title.

== List of leaders ==
No.	Photo	Name (Birth–death)	Constituency / title	Term of office		Prime Minister (term)
No.	Photo	Name (Birth–death)	Constituency / title	Took office	Left office	Prime Minister (term)
General Affairs Chief Secretary (1922–1923)
1		Arahata Katsuzō (1887–1981)	None	5 July 1922	1923	Katō To. 1922–1923
1		Arahata Katsuzō (1887–1981)	None	5 July 1922	1923	Yamamoto 1923–1924
2		Sakai Toshihiko (1871–1933)	None	1923	1923	Yamamoto 1923–1924
Party outlawed by the Government
General Secretary (1945–1970)
1		Kyuichi Tokuda (1894–1953)	Rep for Tokyo 2nd (1946) Tokyo 3rd (1947–1950)	3 December 1945	14 October 1953	Shidehara 1945–1946
1		Kyuichi Tokuda (1894–1953)	Rep for Tokyo 2nd (1946) Tokyo 3rd (1947–1950)	3 December 1945	14 October 1953	Yoshida 1946–1947
1		Kyuichi Tokuda (1894–1953)	Rep for Tokyo 2nd (1946) Tokyo 3rd (1947–1950)	3 December 1945	14 October 1953	Katayama 1947–1948
1		Kyuichi Tokuda (1894–1953)	Rep for Tokyo 2nd (1946) Tokyo 3rd (1947–1950)	3 December 1945	14 October 1953	Ashida 1948
1		Kyuichi Tokuda (1894–1953)	Rep for Tokyo 2nd (1946) Tokyo 3rd (1947–1950)	3 December 1945	14 October 1953	Yoshida 1948–1954
2		Sanzō Nosaka (1892–1993)	Cou for Tokyo at-large (1956–1977)	14 October 1953	1 August 1958	Yoshida 1948–1954
2		Sanzō Nosaka (1892–1993)	Cou for Tokyo at-large (1956–1977)	14 October 1953	1 August 1958	Hatoyama I. 1954–1956
2		Sanzō Nosaka (1892–1993)	Cou for Tokyo at-large (1956–1977)	14 October 1953	1 August 1958	Ishibashi 1956–1957
2		Sanzō Nosaka (1892–1993)	Cou for Tokyo at-large (1956–1977)	14 October 1953	1 August 1958	Kishi 1957–1960
3		Kenji Miyamoto (1908–2007)	None	1 August 1958	7 July 1970	Kishi 1957–1960
3		Kenji Miyamoto (1908–2007)	None	1 August 1958	7 July 1970	Ikeda 1960–1964
3		Kenji Miyamoto (1908–2007)	None	1 August 1958	7 July 1970	Satō 1964–1972
Chairperson (1970–present)
1		Kenji Miyamoto (1908–2007)	Cou for National PR (1977–1989)	7 July 1970	31 July 1982	Satō 1964–1972
1		Kenji Miyamoto (1908–2007)	Cou for National PR (1977–1989)	7 July 1970	31 July 1982	Tanaka K. 1972–1974
1		Kenji Miyamoto (1908–2007)	Cou for National PR (1977–1989)	7 July 1970	31 July 1982	Miki 1974–1976
1		Kenji Miyamoto (1908–2007)	Cou for National PR (1977–1989)	7 July 1970	31 July 1982	Fukuda T. 1976–1978
1		Kenji Miyamoto (1908–2007)	Cou for National PR (1977–1989)	7 July 1970	31 July 1982	Ōhira 1978–1980
1		Kenji Miyamoto (1908–2007)	Cou for National PR (1977–1989)	7 July 1970	31 July 1982	Ito 1980 Acting
1		Kenji Miyamoto (1908–2007)	Cou for National PR (1977–1989)	7 July 1970	31 July 1982	Suzuki Z. 1980–1982
2		Tetsuzo Fuwa (1930–2025)	Rep for Tokyo 6th	31 July 1982	29 November 1987	Suzuki Z. 1980–1982
2		Tetsuzo Fuwa (1930–2025)	Rep for Tokyo 6th	31 July 1982	29 November 1987	Nakasone 1982–1987
2		Tetsuzo Fuwa (1930–2025)	Rep for Tokyo 6th	31 July 1982	29 November 1987	Takeshita 1987–1989
3		Hiromu Murakami (1921–2007)	Rep for Osaka 3rd	29 November 1987	29 May 1989	Takeshita 1987–1989
4 (2)		Tetsuzo Fuwa (1930–2025)	Rep for Tokyo 6th (1969–1996) Tokyo PR block (1996–2003)	29 May 1989	24 November 2000	Takeshita 1987–1989
4 (2)		Tetsuzo Fuwa (1930–2025)	Rep for Tokyo 6th (1969–1996) Tokyo PR block (1996–2003)	29 May 1989	24 November 2000	Uno 1989
4 (2)		Tetsuzo Fuwa (1930–2025)	Rep for Tokyo 6th (1969–1996) Tokyo PR block (1996–2003)	29 May 1989	24 November 2000	Kaifu 1989–1991
4 (2)		Tetsuzo Fuwa (1930–2025)	Rep for Tokyo 6th (1969–1996) Tokyo PR block (1996–2003)	29 May 1989	24 November 2000	Miyazawa 1991–1993
4 (2)		Tetsuzo Fuwa (1930–2025)	Rep for Tokyo 6th (1969–1996) Tokyo PR block (1996–2003)	29 May 1989	24 November 2000	Hosokawa 1993–1994
4 (2)		Tetsuzo Fuwa (1930–2025)	Rep for Tokyo 6th (1969–1996) Tokyo PR block (1996–2003)	29 May 1989	24 November 2000	Hata 1994
4 (2)		Tetsuzo Fuwa (1930–2025)	Rep for Tokyo 6th (1969–1996) Tokyo PR block (1996–2003)	29 May 1989	24 November 2000	Murayama 1994–1996
4 (2)		Tetsuzo Fuwa (1930–2025)	Rep for Tokyo 6th (1969–1996) Tokyo PR block (1996–2003)	29 May 1989	24 November 2000	Hashimoto 1996–1998
4 (2)		Tetsuzo Fuwa (1930–2025)	Rep for Tokyo 6th (1969–1996) Tokyo PR block (1996–2003)	29 May 1989	24 November 2000	Obuchi 1998–2000
4 (2)		Tetsuzo Fuwa (1930–2025)	Rep for Tokyo 6th (1969–1996) Tokyo PR block (1996–2003)	29 May 1989	24 November 2000	Mori 2000–2001
5		Kazuo Shii (born 1954)	Rep for Southern Kanto PR block	24 November 2000	18 January 2024	Mori 2000–2001
5		Kazuo Shii (born 1954)	Rep for Southern Kanto PR block	24 November 2000	18 January 2024	Koizumi 2001–2006
5		Kazuo Shii (born 1954)	Rep for Southern Kanto PR block	24 November 2000	18 January 2024	Abe S. 2006–2007
5		Kazuo Shii (born 1954)	Rep for Southern Kanto PR block	24 November 2000	18 January 2024	Fukuda Y. 2007–2008
5		Kazuo Shii (born 1954)	Rep for Southern Kanto PR block	24 November 2000	18 January 2024	Asō 2008–2009
5		Kazuo Shii (born 1954)	Rep for Southern Kanto PR block	24 November 2000	18 January 2024	Hatoyama Y. 2009–2010
5		Kazuo Shii (born 1954)	Rep for Southern Kanto PR block	24 November 2000	18 January 2024	Kan 2010–2011
5		Kazuo Shii (born 1954)	Rep for Southern Kanto PR block	24 November 2000	18 January 2024	Noda 2011–2012
5		Kazuo Shii (born 1954)	Rep for Southern Kanto PR block	24 November 2000	18 January 2024	Abe S. 2012–2020
5		Kazuo Shii (born 1954)	Rep for Southern Kanto PR block	24 November 2000	18 January 2024	Suga 2020–2021
5		Kazuo Shii (born 1954)	Rep for Southern Kanto PR block	24 November 2000	18 January 2024	Kishida 2021–2024
6		Tomoko Tamura (born 1965)	Cou for National PR (26 July 2010 – 15 October 2024); Rep for Tokyo PR (since 1 November 2024)	18 January 2024	Incumbent	Kishida 2021–2024
6		Tomoko Tamura (born 1965)	Cou for National PR (26 July 2010 – 15 October 2024); Rep for Tokyo PR (since 1 November 2024)	18 January 2024	Incumbent	Ishiba 2024–2025
6		Tomoko Tamura (born 1965)	Cou for National PR (26 July 2010 – 15 October 2024); Rep for Tokyo PR (since 1 November 2024)	18 January 2024	Incumbent	Takaichi 2025–present
