= Cherry blossom scandal =

Japanese political scandal

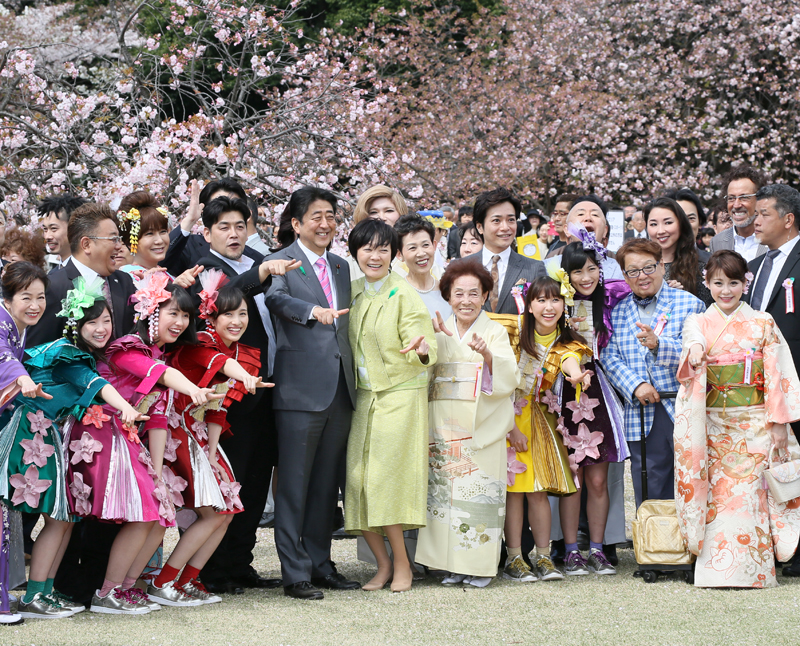
Shinzo Abe and Akie Abe at a Shinjuku Gyoen governmental cherry blossom viewing party in 2017

The cherry blossom scandal (Japanese: 桜を見る会問題, romanized: sakura wo miru kai mondai, lit. 'cherry blossom viewing party problem'), also known as the cherry blossom party scandal or the cherry blossom viewing scandal, was a political scandal in Japan involving Shinzo Abe, the then-prime minister of Japan, and the mismanagement of political funds regarding his constituents from Yamaguchi.

== Original events ==
Since 1952, every April the Japanese government has held annual parties to view cherry blossoms. Between 2015 and 2019, then-prime minister of Japan Shinzo Abe was alleged to have had his political "support group" pay for the dining expenses for his constituents from Yamaguchi Prefecture. According to Justin McCurry in The Guardian, citing the Asahi Shimbun, Abe's constituents paid five thousand yen each for dinner in hotels the night before the events, and that Abe's support group contributed 9.16 million to the total cost of 23 million yen for the dinners. According to The Spectator's Philip Patrick, the viewing parties between 2016 and 2019 were subsidized with 30 million yen by Abe's support group. In the 2019 event, it was alleged that Abe had brought 850 people from his own constituency, leading to allegations of cronyism. At the event that year, on 13 April, 18 thousand attendees were invited, and the 850 who dined with Abe did so at the Hotel New Otani for five thousand yen. According to The Mainichi, Abe's support group funded at least 33 dinners from 2019 to 2020. Abe's successor as Prime Minister, Yoshihide Suga, ended the annual cherry blossom viewing parties upon taking office.

== Legal accusations ==
Within the National Diet of Japan, there were multiple legal accusations against Abe for his involvement in the scandal. The scandal broke when opposition lawmakers accused Abe of covering for guests at an expensive Tokyo hotel in one of the parties in 2018, to which the guests only paid five thousand Japanese yen. In November 2019, Tomoko Tamura, a Diet member affiliated with the Japanese Communist Party, accused Abe of mishandling funds regarding the cherry blossom viewing parties. On 24 November 2020, the Research Bureau of the House of Representatives of Japan published, as requested by opposition parties in the Diet such as the Constitutional Democratic Party of Japan, a report alleging that Abe had provided false accounts of spending during diet sessions in 2019 and 2020. The opposition parties, spurred by JCP Diet member Toru Miyamoto, who raised questions about the 2019 guest list, also questioned whether organized crime figures attended the parties, as the guest list was shredded. The Abe government defended itself, saying that the shredding of the guest list was not a result of Diet allegations. 72% of the public, according to a poll by The Mainichi, did not accept this explanation. The scandal was seen as a possible violation of the Political Funding Law in Japan.

In 2020, according to a poll by Kyodo News, 53 percent of voters for Abe's party, the Liberal Democratic Party, believed he should testify, while 43 percent did not. After Abe's resignation as Prime Minister in 2020, prosecutors declined to indict him for payments made to attendees to the cherry blossom viewing parties, but did press charges against one of his involved aides, Hiroyuki Haikawa, with failing to report 11.6 million yen in payments from guests and a 18.7 million yen payment to the hotel in the cherry blossom parties.
