= Chiba 1st district (1947–1993) =

Legislative district of Japan

Chiba 1st district was a constituency of the House of Representatives in the Diet of Japan. Between 1947 and 1993 it elected initially four, later five Representatives by single non-transferable vote. It was located in Chiba and, as of 1993, consisted of the cities of Chiba (w/o the former town of Toke), Funabashi, Yachiyo, Ichihara and Narashino. Today, the area extends into Chiba's 1st, 2nd, 3rd, 4th and 9th single-member electoral districts.

Until the decline of the LDP in the 1970s after the oil crisis and the Lockheed scandal, the relatively urban district was won by a majority of LDP candidates several times. Representatives for Chiba 1st district included LDP faction leader and home affairs minister Shōjirō Kawashima (Kawashima faction), defense minister Shigejirō Inō (Satō faction), construction minister Ihei Shiseki (Fukuda faction), sōri-fu minister Sōichi Usui (Miki faction) and his son Hideo Usui (Miki (→Kōmoto) faction) and, in the final election period before the election reform, opposition politicians Yoshihiko Noda (JNP) and Kazuo Shii (JCP) who later went on to play leading roles in the opposition parties.

== Summary of results during the 1955 party system ==
General election		1958	1960	1963	1967	1969	1972	1976	1979	1980	1983	1986	1990	1993
LDP & conservative independents		3	3	3	3	2	2	1	1	3	1	3	3	1
Opposition	center-left	0	0	1	0	1	0	1	1	1	1	1	1	3
Opposition	JSP	1	1	0	1	1	1	1	1	0	1	0	1	0
Opposition	JCP	0	0	0	0	0	1	1	1	0	1	1	0	1
District magnitude		4										5		

== Elected representatives ==
election year	highest vote (top tōsen)	2nd	3rd	4th	5th
1947	Noriko Narushima (DP)	Kanemitsu Yoshikawa (JSP)	Isamu Tada (JLP)	Yūtarō Shibuya (JLP)	–
1949	Tōru Sakuma (DLP)	Yoshio Yanagisawa (DLP)	Isamu Tada (DLP)	Yūtarō Shibuya (DLP)	–
1952	Kanemitsu Yoshikawa (JSP, right)	Shōjirō Kawashima (LP)	Sōichi Usui (Progressive)	Shigejirō Inō (LP)	–
1953	Kanemitsu Yoshikawa (JSP, right)	Ihei Shiseki (Hatoyama LP)	Shōjirō Kawashima (Yoshida LP)	Sōichi Usui (Yoshida LP)	–
1955	Shōjirō Kawashima (JDP)	Kanemitsu Yoshikawa (JSP, right)	Sōichi Usui (JDP)	Jūkichi Yokozeni (JSP, left)	–
1958	Shōjirō Kawashima (LDP)	Ihei Shiseki (LDP)	Kanemitsu Yoshikawa (JSP)	Sōichi Usui (LDP)	–
1960	Shōjirō Kawashima (LDP)	Toyojirō Fujiwara (JSP)	Ihei Shiseki (LDP)	Sōichi Usui (LDP)	–
1963	Shōjirō Kawashima (LDP)	Kanemitsu Yoshikawa (DSP)	Sōichi Usui (LDP)	Ihei Shiseki (LDP)	–
1967	Minoru Kihara (JSP)	Shōjirō Kawashima (LDP)	Ihei Shiseki (LDP)	Sōichi Usui (LDP)	–
1969	Shōjirō Kawashima † (LDP)	Kazuo Torii (Kōmeitō)	Minoru Kihara (JSP)	Ihei Shiseki (LDP)	–
1972	Makoto Someya (LDP)	Minoru Kihara (JSP)	Sōichi Usui (LDP)	Mutsuo Shibata (JCP)	–
1976	Kazuo Torii (Kōmeitō)	Ihei Shiseki (LDP)	Minoru Kihara (JSP)	Mutsuo Shibata (JCP)	–
1979	Kazuo Torii (Kōmeitō)	Ihei Shiseki (LDP)	Mutsuo Shibata (JCP)	Minoru Kihara (JSP)	–
1980	Sanbachi Taidō (Ind.)	Ihei Shiseki (LDP)	Hideo Usui (LDP)	Kazuo Torii (Kōmeitō)	–
1983	Kazuo Torii (Kōmeitō)	Hideo Usui (LDP)	Mutsuo Shibata (JCP)	Ken'ichi Ueno (JSP)	–
1986	Hideo Usui (LDP)	Kazuo Eguchi (LDP)	Kazuo Torii (Kōmeitō)	Masayuki Okajima (LDP)	Mutsuo Shibata (JCP)
1990	Ken'ichi Ueno (JSP)	Hideo Usui (LDP)	Kazuo Eguchi (LDP)	Kazuo Torii (Kōmeitō)	Masayuki Okajima (LDP)
1993	Yoshihiko Noda (JNP)	Masayuki Okajima (JRP)	Kazuo Torii (Kōmeitō)	Hideo Usui (LDP)	Kazuo Shii (JCP)

== Late election results ==
1993
Party	Candidate	Votes	%	±%
JNP	Yoshihiko Noda	175,671	20.5	
JRP	Masayuki Okajima	151,163	17.7	
Kōmeitō	Kazuo Torii	113,706	13.3	
LDP	Hideo Usui	108,613	12.7	
JCP	Kazuo Shii	98,297	11.5	
LDP	Kazuo Eguchi	97,277	11.4	
JSP	Hiroharu Yoshimine	82,633	9.7	
DSP	Takuya Watanabe	22,935	2.7	
Independent	Kazuo Wakimoto	4,835	0.6	

1990
Party	Candidate	Votes	%	±%
JSP	Ken’ichi Ueno	221,216	25.2	
LDP	Hideo Usui	132,238	15.0	
LDP	Kazuo Eguchi	127,689	14.5	
Kōmeitō	Kazuo Torii	109,241	12.4	
LDP	Masayuki Okajima	106,202	12.1	
JCP	Mutsuo Shibata	97,917	11.1	
DSP	Takayuki Kojima	76,075	8.7	
Independent	Kazuo Wakimoto	3,776	0.6	
NDP	Kunio Sakai	2,277	0.3	
Earth Restoration Party	Shin'ya Satō	2,187	0.2	

1986
Party	Candidate	Votes	%	±%
LDP	Hideo Usui	124,074	16.8	
LDP	Kazuo Eguchi	119,055	16.1	
Kōmeitō	Kazuo Torii	114,824	15.5	
LDP	Masayuki Okajima	98,276	13.3	
JCP	Mutsuo Shibata	97,900	13.2	
JSP	Ken’ichi Ueno	92,993	12.6	
DSP	Takayuki Kojima	88,557	12.0	
Independent	Kazuo Wakimoto	4,382	0.6	
