= Hiromu Murakami =

Japanese politician

- 村上 弘
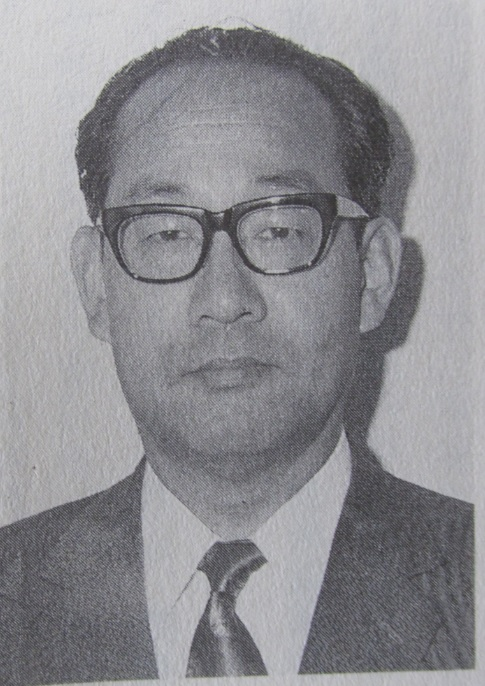

Chairman of the Japanese Communist Party
- In office 29 November 1987 – 29 May 1989
- Preceded by: Tetsuzo Fuwa
- Succeeded by: Tetsuzo Fuwa

Member of the House of Representatives
- In office 8 July 1986 – 24 January 1990
- Preceded by: Seat established
- Succeeded by: Etsuko Sugano
- Constituency: Osaka 3rd
- In office 8 October 1979 – 28 November 1983
- Preceded by: Ken Harada
- Succeeded by: Mikio Ōmi
- Constituency: Osaka 3rd
- In office 11 December 1972 – 9 December 1976
- Preceded by: Kanji Okazawa
- Succeeded by: Kansei Nakano
- Constituency: Osaka 3rd

Personal details
- Born: 24 September 1921 Innoshima, Hiroshima, Japan
- Died: 22 March 2007 (aged 85)
- Party: Communist

Hiromu Murakami (Japanese: 村上 弘, Murakami Hiromu; 24 September 1921 – 22 March 2007) was a Japanese politician who served as the third chairman of the Japanese Communist Party from 1987 until 1989.

== Biography ==
He was born in Innoshima, Hiroshima (today Onomichi), as the fifth of ten children.

A graduate of the Ministry of Communications, he was stationed as a soldier in Hiroshima during the war. In 1946, Murakami became the first chairman at an Osaka-based labor union office, and in the following year, he joined the Japanese Communist Party. In 1948, he was suspected of being the ringleader behind the Hanshin Education Incident, and as a result he spent the next year and eight months in an Osaka prison for violating occupation edicts. Murakami eventually became the chairman of the JCP's Osaka chapter, and in 1967 he attempted to run in Osaka's gubernatorial elections, coming in at third place with 260,661 votes, or only 11.31% of the total votes. However, in 1972 he was elected to the House of Representatives for the first time as a successor to Yokota Jintarō in Osaka's 3rd district. In addition, he also became a committee member of the National Association for Peace, Democracy, and Innovation in Japan, which formed in 1981. He served in a number of formal capacities, such as being the JCP's legislative strategy chairman, the supervisor of its policy committee, and vice president of its board of directors. He would also write a few books on political topics throughout his career.

When then-Chairman Tetsuzo Fuwa was hospitalised for heart disease in March 1987, Murakami became acting chairman, and then was formally elected as the chairman by the JCP's central committee in November. JCP's earlier foreign policy was revised around this time through its recognition of South Korea, and as a result a reporter for the JCP's official Red Flag newspaper was dispatched to the country, among other gestures. However, Murakami announced that he had developed ophthalmoparesis as a result of cerebrovascular disease at a speech in Shiga in February 1989, and later resigned as chairman on 29 May. Kenji Miyamoto appointed Secretary General Mitsuhiro Kaneko to serve as acting chairman in the meantime, but Vice-chairman Tetsuzo Fuwa was reappointed as chairman once again at the 5th Central Committee General Assembly on 8 June. After resigning, Murakami withdrew from all of his official roles at the JCP as well as from the Diet. He died of pneumonia on 22 March 2007.
