= Kazuo Shii =

Japanese politician

- 志位 和夫
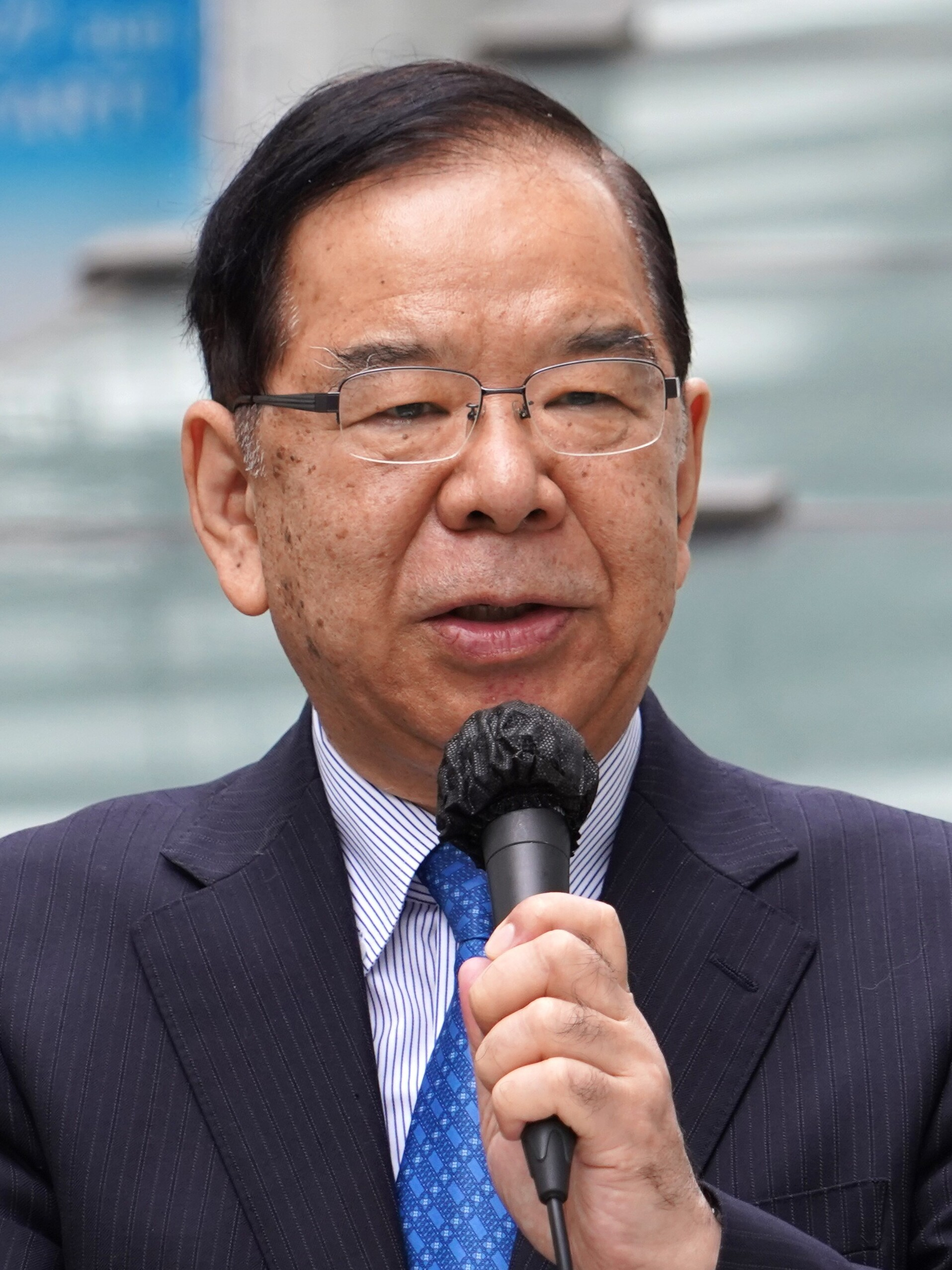
- Shii in October 2024

Chairman of the Central Committee of the Japanese Communist Party
- Incumbent
- Assumed office 18 January 2024
- Preceded by: Tetsuzo Fuwa (2006)

Chairman of the Japanese Communist Party
- In office 24 November 2000 – 18 January 2024
- Preceded by: Tetsuzo Fuwa
- Succeeded by: Tomoko Tamura

Secretary-General of the Japanese Communist Party
- In office 13 July 1990 – 24 November 2000
- Chairman: Tetsuzo Fuwa
- Preceded by: Mitsuhiro Kaneko
- Succeeded by: Tadayoshi Ichida

Member of the House of Representatives
- In office 18 July 1993 – 23 January 2026
- Preceded by: Ken'ichi Ueno
- Succeeded by: Kimie Hatano
- Constituency: Chiba 1st (1993–1996); Southern Kanto PR (1996–2026)

Personal details
- Born: 29 July 1954 (age 72) Yotsukaidō, Chiba, Japan
- Party: Communist
- Education: University of Tokyo (BE)
- Occupation: Politician and staff of the political party
- Website: www.shii.gr.jp

Kazuo Shii (志位 和夫, Shii Kazuo; born 29 July 1954) is a Japanese politician who has been the chairman of the Central Committee of the Japanese Communist Party (JCP) since 2024. He previously served as the chairman of the Executive Committee of the Central Committee of the JCP from 24 November 2000 to 18 January 2024.

Born in Yotsukaidō in Chiba Prefecture, Shii first joined the JCP while studying engineering physics at the University of Tokyo. He participated in the JCP's Tokyo Committee after graduation, and worked in the Party Central Committee from 1982. He became the head of the secretariat in 1990, and was elected as a member of the House of Representatives in 1993. He became the chairman of the Party Executive Committee in 2000. He led the party until 18 January 2024, when he resigned as the executive committee chairman, and was succeeded by Tomoko Tamura. On the same day, Shii was appointed as the chairman of the Central Committee.

== Early life ==
Shii was born in Yotsukaidō in Chiba Prefecture, the son of two schoolteachers. He graduated with a Bachelor of Engineering degree in physics and engineering from the University of Tokyo. He joined the JCP during his first year at the university and became an active participant in the party's student wing. After graduation, he got a job in the JCP-Tokyo Committee to lead Waseda University's youth student movement. He worked in the Central Committee of the JCP from 1982.

== Political career ==
=== Head of the Secretariat (1990–2000) ===
On 13 July 1990, Shii became the head of the party's secretariat. In 1993, he was elected as a member of the House of Representatives for the first time from the Chiba 1st district, which was then a multi-member electoral district with five slots, narrowly coming in last at 5th place with 1,020 votes over sixth-place LDP candidate Kazuo Eguchi.

=== Chairman of the JCP Executive Committee (2000–2024) ===
Shii became the party's leader on 24 November 2000.

In 2006, Shii became the first JCP chairman to visit South Korea, where he traveled to an international conference of Asian political parties. He visited the site of Seodaemun Prison and paid tribute to the memory of Korean anti-colonial activists who were imprisoned during the period of Japanese colonialism. Shii also met the speaker of the National Assembly, the chairman of the Uri Party, and the floor leader of the Grand National Party. He also became the first JCP leader to visit the United States, doing so in April 2010.

In 2016, Shii proposed a "national coalition government", promoting the joint fielding of candidates with other opposition parties. That year, he amended the JCP constitution to accept the Japan Self-Defense Forces and the Imperial House for the time being.

In early 2023, it was rumored that Shii was facing turmoil within his own party due to his failure to gain traction for the party and his prolonged leadership. At a press conference on 19 January, former party foreign policy committee director Nobuyuki Matsutake called it "far from the common sense of the people" for Shii to hold onto his position for over 20 years and advocated for the reform of the party leadership election system so that the party leader would be elected directly by the party members. On 21 January, party newspaper Shimbun Akahata published a commentary piece titled "Clear deviation from the constitution and platform", rebutting his words and actions; Shii called the commentary "correct" at a press conference on 23 January, saying calls to introduce a public election system were a violation of the party constitution.

=== Chairman of the Central Committee (2024–present) ===
At the JCP convention on 18 January 2024, Shii resigned as the party chairman, with Tomoko Tamura succeeding him. At the same convention, Shii was appointed as the chairman of the Central Committee, a post that had been vacant since 2006.

== Political positions ==
=== Foreign relations ===
In 2020, under Shii's leadership, the Japanese Communist Party denounced the Chinese Communist Party and the Chinese government for its activities in the East China Sea, in the South China Sea, and elsewhere in the Asia-Pacific region. A position paper issued by the party said that China's "great-power chauvinism and hegemonism" were "an adverse current to world peace and progress." At the party's conference in Atami, Shizuoka Prefecture, Shii said that "the Chinese leadership’s mistake is extremely serious. That action does not deserve the name of the Communist Party." The Japanese and Chinese communist parties had previously been diverging for decades.

Shii has been sanctioned by Russia over his support for Ukraine in the Russo-Ukrainian war.

== Personal life ==
Shii plays the piano; he has said music is "a part of his life" and seriously considered becoming a musician. When he was about to begin university, he considered majoring in music or physics, and chose physics in the end. Shii says his favorite composers are Franz Schubert and Dmitri Shostakovich. Despite being on starkly opposite ends of the ideological spectrum, Shii took part in a dialogue with former prime minister Junichiro Koizumi in 2020, where they discussed their mutual love for classical music.

== Works ==
- Shii, Kazuo (1992). What is Scientific Socialism?. Tokyo: Shinnihon Shuppansha. ISBN 4-406-02064-0.
- Shii, Kazuo (2007). What kind of party is the Japanese Communist Party?. Tokyo: Shinnihon Shuppansha. ISBN 978-4406050180.

House of Representatives (Japan)
New title Introduction of proportional representation	Representative for the Southern Kantō PR block 1996–	Incumbent
Preceded by Ken'ichi Ueno; Hideo Usui; Kazuo Eguchi; Kazuo Torii; Masayuki Okajima	Representative for Chiba 1st district 1993–1996; Served alongside: Yoshihiko Noda, Masayuki Okajima, Kazuo Torii, Hideo Usui	District eliminated
Party political offices
Vacant	Chairman of the Central Committee, Japan Communist Party; 2024–present	Incumbent
Preceded by Tetsuzō Fuwa	Chairman of the Executive Committee, Japan Communist Party; 2000–2024	Succeeded by Tomoko Tamura
Preceded by Mitsuhiro Kaneko	Secretary General of the Central Committee, Japan Communist Party; 1990–2000	Succeeded by Tadayoshi Ichida
