= Tetsuzo Fuwa =

Japanese politician (1930–2025)

- 不破 哲三
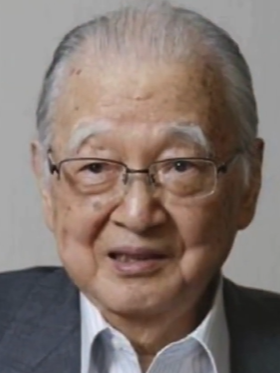

Chairman of the Central Committee of the Japanese Communist Party
- In office 24 November 2000 – 14 January 2006
- Preceded by: Kenji Miyamoto (1997)
- Succeeded by: Kazuo Shii (2024)

Chairman of the Japanese Communist Party
- In office 29 May 1989 – 24 November 2000
- Preceded by: Hiromu Murakami
- Succeeded by: Kazuo Shii
- In office 31 July 1982 – 29 November 1987
- Preceded by: Kenji Miyamoto
- Succeeded by: Hiromu Murakami

Member of the House of Representatives
- In office 29 December 1969 – 10 October 2003
- Preceded by: Susumu Sano
- Succeeded by: Multi-member district
- Constituency: Tokyo 6th (1969–1996); Tokyo PR (1996–2003)

Personal details
- Born: 26 January 1930 Nakano, Tokyo, Japan
- Died: 30 December 2025 (aged 95) Tokyo, Japan
- Party: Communist
- Education: University of Tokyo
- Occupation: Politician and staff of the political party

Tetsuzo Fuwa (不破 哲三, Fuwa Tetsuzō; 26 January 1930 – 30 December 2025) was the pen name of Kenjiro Ueda (上田 建二郎, Ueda Kenjirō), a member and chairman of the Japanese Communist Party. He was a graduate of Tokyo University. He joined the Communist Party in 1947, and was elected to the House of Representatives in 1969.

== Life and career ==
In around 1972, Fuwa, replacing certain senior party members, was placed in higher positions within the JCP as part of the party's attempts at changing its image and courting younger voters, with the Asahi Shimbun commenting on Fuwa's "eloquency, gentle manner and good looks" in connection to the JCP's electoral strategy. Fuwa was one of the figures in the party who were instrumental in the movement to change the JCP's general image from that of a violent revolutionary group to a reformist and democratic one.

Fuwa was eventually selected to be the chairman of the JCP from 1982 to 1987; he held the position again from 1989 to 2000. He was president of the Central Committee from 2000 to 2006. Fuwa reportedly declined to reattempt election in the 2003 Japanese general election, which ended his career in the Diet that had lasted over 30 years by then. As of the JCP's 28th party congress in January 2020, he remained a member of the party's standing committee and presidium. He stepped down as a member of the party's executive committee as a result of the resignation of his successor as chairman, Kazuo Shii, in 2024.

He was an advocate of scientific socialism and he believed that socialism should be achieved through stages.

Fuwa died in Tokyo on 30 December 2025 at the age of 95.
