= Kenji Miyamoto (politician) =

Japanese communist politician (1908–2007)

- 宮本 顕治
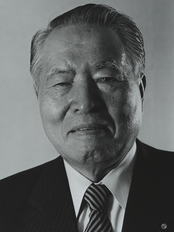
- Official portrait, 1982

Chairman of the Central Committee of the Japanese Communist Party
- In office 31 July 1982 – 26 September 1992
- Preceded by: Sanzō Nosaka
- Succeeded by: Tetsuzo Fuwa (2000)

Chairman of the Japanese Communist Party
- In office 7 July 1970 – 31 July 1982
- Preceded by: Himself (as General Secretary)
- Succeeded by: Tetsuzo Fuwa

General Secretary of the Japanese Communist Party
- In office 1 August 1958 – 7 July 1970
- Preceded by: Sanzo Nosaka
- Succeeded by: Himself (as Chairman)

Member of House of Councillors
- In office 11 July 1977 – 9 July 1989
- Constituency: National district (1977–1983); National PR (1983–1989)

Personal details
- Born: 17 October 1908 Hikari, Yamaguchi, Japan
- Died: 18 July 2007 (aged 98) Shibuya, Tokyo, Japan
- Party: Communist
- Spouse(s): Yuriko Chūjō (m. 1932; died 1951) Sueko Ōmori (m. 1956)
- Education: Tokyo Imperial University

Kenji Miyamoto (宮本 顕治, Miyamoto Kenji; 17 October 1908 – 18 July 2007) was a Japanese communist politician. He was the leader of the Japanese Communist Party (JCP) from 1958 to 1977.

== Early life ==
Miyamoto was born in Shimata-mura (島田村), Yamaguchi in 1908. He was originally from Yamaguchi Prefecture. Miyamoto attended and graduated from Tokyo Imperial University in March 1931, which is now the University of Tokyo, where he majored in economics.

== Japanese Communist Party ==
Kenji Miyamoto officially joined the Japanese Communist Party (JCP) two months after graduation in May 1931. In 1932 Miyamoto married author and humanitarian activist Yuriko Chūjō who had returned from living in the Soviet Union together with Yuasa Yoshiko. Chūjō was editor of the Marxist literary journal Hataraku Fujin (Working Women), a leading figure in the proletarian literature movement and a member of the JCP. Since its founding in 1922, the JCP had been outlawed under the Peace Preservation Law and subjected to repression and persecution by the government of Imperial Japan. Miyamoto was arrested by the Japanese military police in 1933 and accused of conspiring to beat a policeman to death in a crackdown on Japanese communists. He denied that he had committed the crime. Miyamoto was convicted of the conspiracy charges and sentenced to life in prison. He was released 12 years later after Japan surrendered, ending World War II in 1945. His prison sentence had been annulled following an imperial decree by emperor Hirohito.

Miyamoto reentered politics soon after his release from prison and once again became involved with the Japanese Communist Party. He led the Communist's 1949 election campaign, which saw the JCP win 35 seats. The JCP lost ground in 1950, just before the start of the Korean War, just across the Sea of Japan. Gen. Douglas MacArthur, the American Supreme Commander for the Allied Powers in Japan, banned Miyamoto and 23 other high ranking JCP members from holding any public office.

Miyamoto became head of the JCP in 1958. That same year, Miyamoto publicly renounced his previous calls for a violent communist revolution in Japan. Instead, he and the JCP now switched to a peaceful stance, which Miyamoto called "smiling communism". The party under Miyamoto began emphasizing issues such as housing, inflation and education. Miyamoto further mainstreamed the JCP throughout his term. He oversaw the removal of the phrase "proletarian dictatorship" following the JCP convention in 1976 and replaced it with a declaration supporting democracy and freedom. The party has continued with this platform that Miyamoto began up to the present day.

The JCP rebounded under Miyamoto from its leaders' partial ban in 1950, despite its opposition to the existence of the Japanese Imperial Family, which made the party unpopular with many Japanese. The JCP reached its electoral zenith in 1979 when it captured 8% of the seats in Japan's lower house of Parliament, the House of Representatives.

Miyamoto was known for his independent views. He visited China in 1966 and called the Cultural Revolution "abnormal." He was noted for his outspoken condemnation of the 1968 Soviet Union invasion of Czechoslovakia. Miyamoto also opposed the close alliance between Japan and the United States. Following the fall of communism in eastern Europe, Miyamoto stated that it was a defeat for Stalinism and the Soviet-backed governments, but not for socialism.

Miyamoto stepped down as leader of the JCP in 1977. He was succeeded as presidium chairman by Tetsuzo Fuwa in 1982. Miyamoto remained active within the JCP and continued to hold the post of chairman until his official retirement in September 1997. He held an honorary position from 1997 until his death in 2007.

Miyamoto died from emphysema in a Tokyo hospital on 18 July 2007. He was 98 years old. Yuriko Miyamoto had died in 1951.

== See also ==
- Japanese dissidence during the Shōwa period
