= Nyonin Geijutsu =

Japanese women's literary magazine (July 1928 to June 1932)

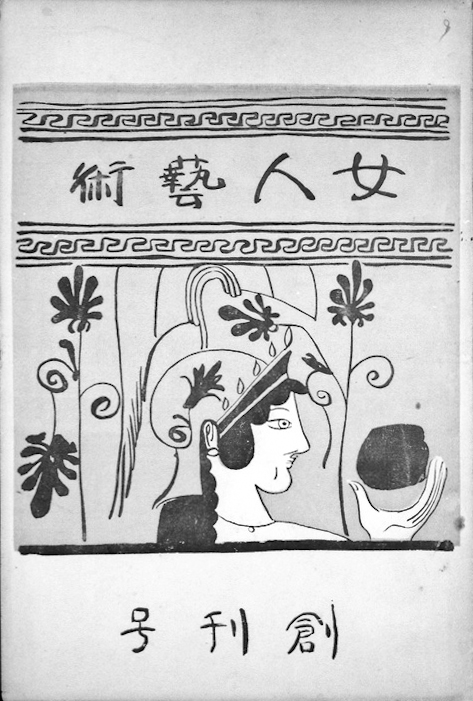
Cover of the first issue

The Nyonin Geijutsu (女人芸術), which translates to Women's Arts, was a Japanese women's literary magazine that ran from July 1928 to June 1932. It was published by Hasegawa Shigure. They published 48 issues that focused on feminism and women's art and literature. It was one of the most influential Japanese literary women's magazines since the Bluestocking.

== History ==
The Nyonin Geijutsu was first published in July 1928 by Hasegawa Shigure. The magazine was written, edited, designed, and published by women, and their goal was women's liberation. The magazine was funded by Hasegawa's husband, the popular author Mikami Otokichi.

When the magazine first began publishing, Hasegawa was in charge of publication, Sogawa Kinuko was the editor, and the printer was Hanayo Ikuta. They published it in Hasegawa's home in what is now Shinjuku. Later Hasegawa also edited, and the place of publication moved to what is now Akasaka.

The May and June 1930 issues were banned. The October 1931 issue was banned. The magazine continued publication after the Mukden Incident, but suddenly stopped publishing in June 1932 because of Hasegawa's worsening health. The June issue was printed, but was destroyed. After that, the Nyonin Geijutsusha started a new magazine called Kagayaku.

== Notable contributors ==
Some writers for the magazine included Yaeko Nogami, Ichiko Kamichika, Yamakawa Kikue, Takamure Itsue, Yoshiko Yuasa, Miyamoto Yuriko, Fumiko Hayashi, Ineko Sata, Taiko Hirabayashi, Sasaki Fumiko Enchi, and Yoko Ota. In the magazine's later years, male authors like Hajime Kawakami, Kiyoshi Miki, Eitaro Noro, and Takiji Kobayashi also contributed.

At first they published serialized novels, poems, essays, and reviews, but eventually they began publishing more pleasure reading and proletarian fiction. However, it remained a fundamentally literary, left-leaning publication that reported on the Soviet Union, the labor movement, and international issues. They also published articles by anarchists like Mochizuki Yuriko and Aki Yagi, and communists like Yukiko Nakashima.
