= Ikuta Chōkō =

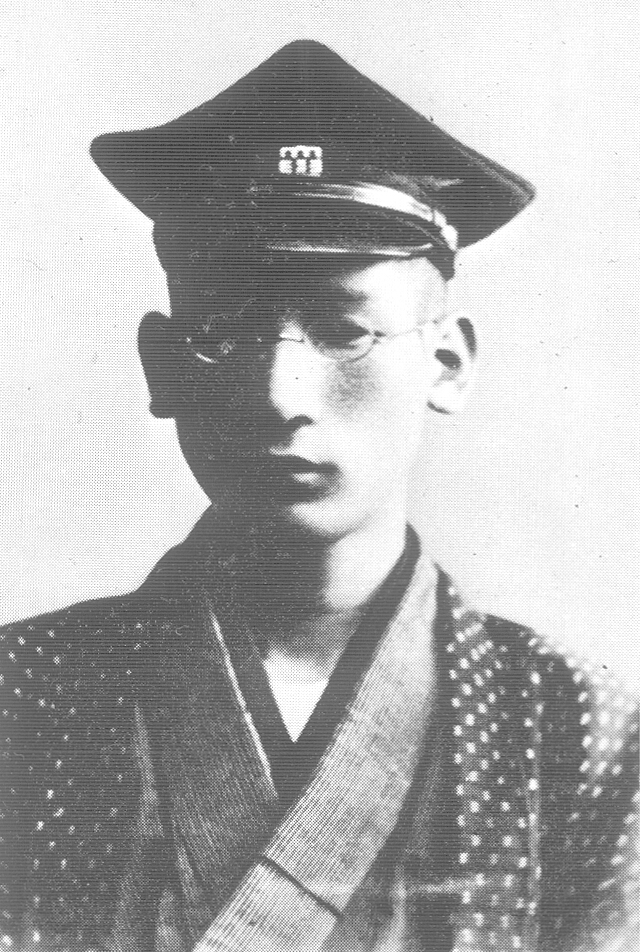
- Ikuta Chōkō in 1903
- Born: 21 April 1882; Hino, Tottori, Japan
- Died: 11 January 1936 (aged 53); Tokyo, Japan
- Occupation: Translator

Ikuta Chōkō (生田長江, Ikuta Chōkō; 21 April 1882 - 11 January 1936) was the pen-name of a noted translator, author and literary critic in Taishō and Shōwa period Japan. His real name was Ikuta Kōji (生田弘治, Ikuta Kōji).

== Biography ==
Ikuta was born in what is now part of the town of Hino, Tottori, and was educated at St Andrew’s School in Osaka, a school run by the Anglican Church in Japan. In 1898 he converted to Unitarianism. He moved to Tokyo the following year and was accepted into the First Higher School in 1900. He was accepted into the Department of Literature of Tokyo Imperial University in 1903. While in Tokyo, he became friends with Ueda Bin, who suggested his nickname. He graduated in 1906, and after returning briefly to Tottori to get married, moved into rooms provided by Yosano Tekkan and Yosano Akiko in Kōjimachi, Tokyo, where he taught as an English language instructor at a women’s college until 1909. This was also the start of his association with women’s literature, and his literary circle included Okamoto Kanoko, Yamakawa Kikue and Hiratsuka Raichō.

In 1909, Ikuta began his translation of Friedrich Nietzsche’s Thus Spoke Zarathustra into Japanese, which was completed in 1911. The same year, he also assisted Hiratsuka in the publication of her literary magazine Bluestocking. He continued to work on translation of Nietzsche from 1916 through 1929, eventually translating all of Nietzsche’s works into Japanese. He also translated Homer’s Odyssey in 1922.

Also around this time, Ikuta began a correspondence with the socialist Sakai Toshihiko and the anarchist Ōsugi Sakae. This led to an interest in the works of Karl Marx, and he translated Das Kapital into Japanese in 1919. However, his flirtation with Marxism was short-lived, and he had distanced himself from Marxist ideals by 1923. His interest in anarchism lasted longer, and he maintained a correspondence with Takamure Itsue for many years. He translated Dante’s Divine Comedy in 1924.

From 1925 to 1930 Ikuta moved to Yuigahama in Kamakura. At some point before this time, he contracted Hansen’s Disease. He left Kamakura before the physical effects of the disease became apparent, and he lived in Shibuya, Tokyo, until his death in 1936. His final work was a translation of Dumas’s Camellia.

Ikuta's grave is at Hase-dera in Kamakura.

== See also ==
- Japanese literature
- List of Japanese authors
