= Kikue =

- Gender: Female

Origin
- Origin: Japanese
- Meaning: Different meanings depending on the kanji used

Kikue (written: 菊栄) is a feminine Japanese given name. Notable people with the name include:

- Okanoue Kikue (岡上 菊栄; 1867–1947), Japanese educator
- Yamakawa Kikue (山川 菊栄; 1890–1980), Japanese activist, writer, socialist, and feminist
