= Miyamoto Yuriko =

Japanese novelist, social activist, and literary critic (1899–1951)

- 宮本 百合子
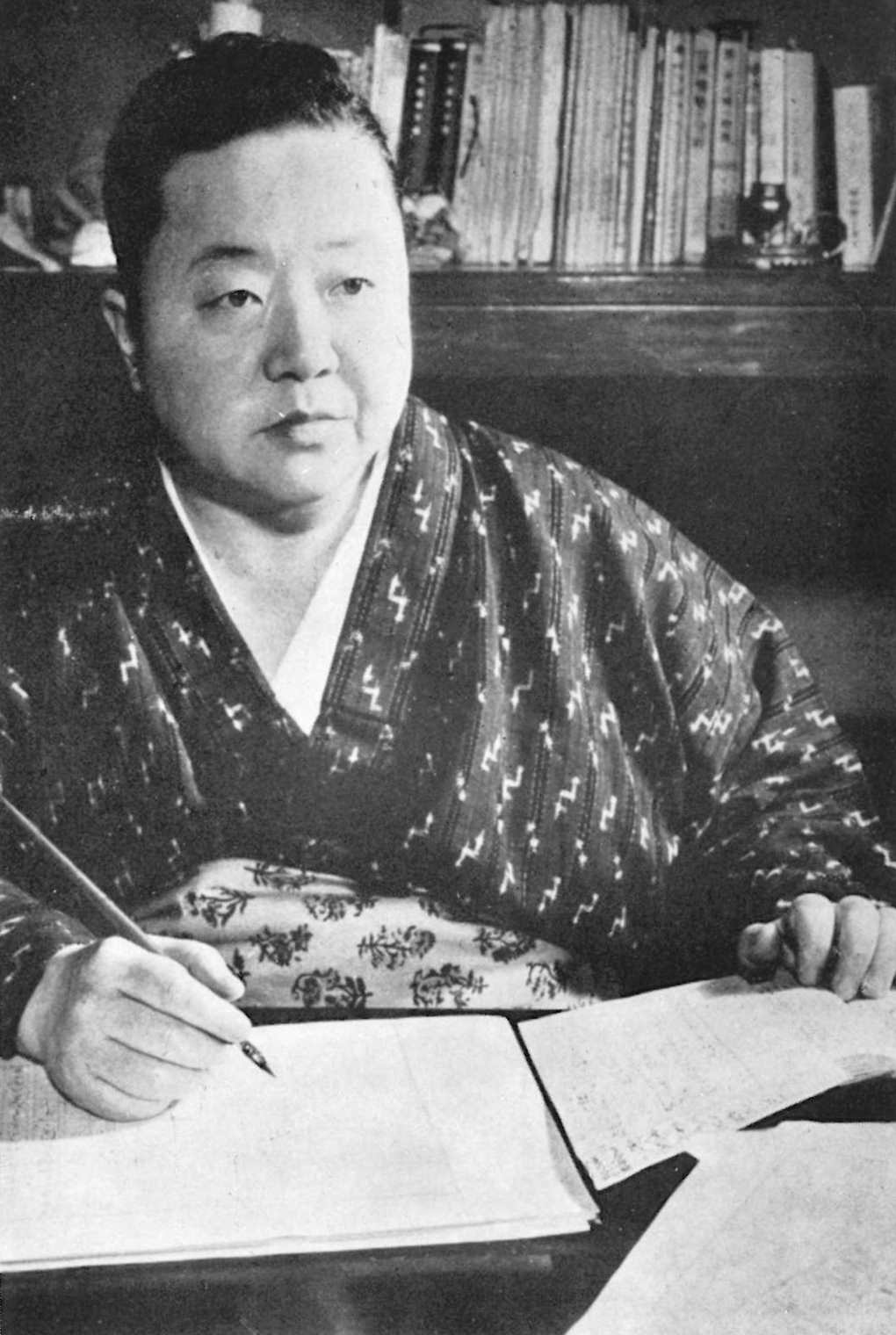
- Miyamoto in 1950
- Born: Chūjō Yuriko; 13 February 1899; Tokyo, Japan
- Died: 21 January 1951 (aged 51); Tokyo, Japan
- Occupation: Writer
- Spouse(s): Araki Shigeru (m. 1919; div. 1924) Kenji Miyamoto (m. 1932)
- Writing career
- Genres: Novels, short stories, essays, literary criticism
- Literary movement: Proletarian literature movement

Miyamoto Yuriko (宮本 百合子; née Chūjō (中條); 13 February 1899 – 21 January 1951) was a Japanese novelist, short-story writer, social activist, and literary critic active during the Taishō and early Shōwa eras of Japan. She is best known for her autobiographical fiction and involvement in proletarian and women's liberation movements.

Miyamoto began writing while she was still in school. She traveled for several years to the United States and the Soviet Union before returning to Japan, where her works were heavily censored and she was imprisoned repeatedly for her political views. She founded and operated a number of proletarian and feminist magazines during her career, many of which were also censored.

Her works include Nobuko, Banshū heiya (The Banshū Plain), Fūchisō (The Weathervane Plant), and other works of fiction and literary criticism. Much of her work is autobiographical and centers around themes of war, class, and gender relations. She and her husband, Miyamoto Kenji, continue to be honored by the Japanese Left for their vision and commitment toward Japanese women and the working class.

== Early life ==
Miyamoto Yuriko was born Chūjō Yuriko on 13 February 1899 in the Koishikawa district of Tokyo (now part of Bunkyō district) to privileged parents. Her father was a Cambridge and Tokyo Imperial University-trained architect, and her mother was a former painter, whose career had halted when she discovered that Ueno National Art School did not accept women. Miyamoto's mother had no intention of forcing her into the Good Wife, Wise Mother role encouraged by the Meiji government.

Miyamoto attended Ochanomizu Girls' Middle School. She was aware at an early age of the differences between her own circumstances and those of the sharecroppers who worked her family's land, as shown in her early work "Nōson" ("Farming Village"), which drew on many of the same influences as her later work "Mazushiki hitobito no mure" ("A Crowd of Poor People"). Miyamoto's concern for differences in social and economic status drew her towards socialism, and later towards the early Japanese feminist movement.

Miyamoto took an early interest in literature, including both Japanese writers, such as Higuchi Ichiyō, Futabatei Shimei, and Natsume Sōseki, and non-Japanese writers, including Oscar Wilde, Edgar Allan Poe, Fyodor Dostoevsky, and Leo Tolstoy. While in her teens and a freshman in the English literature department of Japan Women's University, she wrote the short story "Mazushiki hitobito no mure" ("A Crowd of Poor People"), which was accepted for publication in the prestigious Chūō Kōron (Central Forum) literary magazine in September 1916. Her story won a literary prize sponsored by the Shirakaba (White Birch) literary circle and was endorsed by Tsubouchi Shōyō.

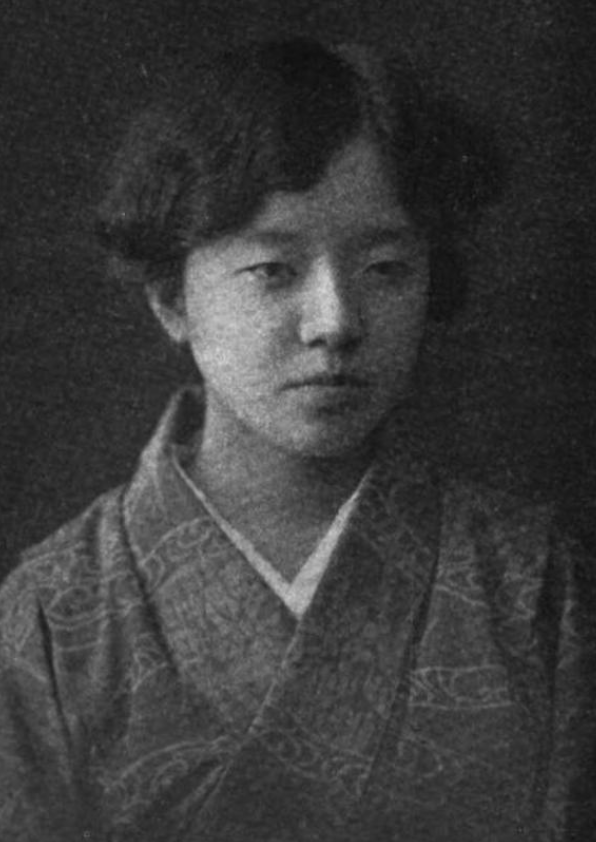
Yuriko Chujo as a "rising novelist", from a 1918 publication

== Travel to United States and first marriage ==
In 1918, Miyamoto left the university without graduating and traveled to the United States with her father. She went to New York, where she studied at Columbia University and met her first husband, Araki Shigeru, with whom she would return to Japan. She broke a number of social norms, including entering a love marriage, proposing herself, and refusing to take her husband's surname. The two were different in terms of age, socio-economic class, and intellectual interests, and the couple divorced in 1924, inspiring her semi-autobiographical Nobuko (1924–1926), which criticizes conventional ideas of gender and love as it relates the failure of the protagonist's marriage, her travels abroad, and her quest for independence. Considered a feminist I-novel, it was serialized in the journal Kaizo (Re-creation) from 1924 through 1926 before being published as a book in 1928.

Upon her return to Japan, Miyamoto met Russian-language scholar Yuasa Yoshiko, through a mutual writing friend Nogami Yaeko. The two bonded over their mutual interest in Russian literature, particularly Chekhov, and Miyamoto contemplated dedicating Nobuko to Yuasa, with whom she entered into an intimate relationship after the failure of her marriage in 1924. The first few years of their relationship provided inspiration for another semi-autobiographical story, "Ippon no hana" (One Flower), which Miyamoto published in 1927.

== Travel to Soviet Union and second marriage ==
In 1927, Miyamoto and Yuasa traveled to the Soviet Union, where they lived together for three more years. In Moscow, they studied the Russian language and Russian literature and developed a friendship with noted movie director Sergei Eisenstein. Yuasa dedicated herself to Russian translation, while Miyamoto observed the advancement of women in the Communist state.

Miyamoto and Yuasa returned to Japan in November 1930. Upon return, their relationship became rocky, in part due to the social pressures on women at the time; Yuasa openly identified as lesbian, while Miyamoto struggled with the place of female love in modernizing Japan, as she would express in later works. This disagreement was exacerbated by Yoshiko's violent outbursts and accusations of Miyamoto's dishonesty, which are evidenced by both women's correspondences.

Upon their return to Japan, Miyamoto became editor of the Marxist literary journal Hataraku Fujin (Working Women) and a leading figure in the proletarian literature movement. She also joined the Japan Proletarian Writers' League and the Japan Communist Party, through which she met its secretary-general, the communist literary critic and her future husband Miyamoto Kenji. She separated from Yuasa and married Miyamoto Kenji in 1932, a transition which has been interpreted as less romantic than dutiful.

== Censorship in Japan ==
In February 1930, following an anarchist-Bolshevik debate (ana-boru ronsō), Miyamoto Yuriko, along with Takamure Itsue, Yagi Akiko, and other editors who preferred anarchism, separated from women's literary magazine Nyonin geijutsu (Women's Arts) to form their own journal Fujin sensen (Ladies' Front). However, with government enforcement of the Peace Preservation Laws and the increasingly severe suppression of leftist political movements, Miyamoto's works were heavily censored and her magazine was forbidden to publish.

In 1932, both Miyamoto Yuriko and Miyamoto Kenji were arrested alongside other Communist writers. Miyamoto was repeatedly arrested and harassed by the police and spent more than two years in prison between 1932 and 1942. Her husband, Miyamoto Kenji, was arrested again in December 1933 and held in prison until August 1945. During this time, she wrote a large number of essays and stories detailing the struggles of Communists in 1930's Japan, including "Kokukoku" ("Moment by Moment"), which was not published until after her death and describes the tortures endured by Communist prisoners.

During Miyamoto Kenji's imprisonment, Miyamoto Yuriko rekindled her friendship with Yuasa Yoshiko, though they did not resume their previous intimacy. Miyamoto Yuriko remained faithful to both her husband and to Communism, which for her had become intertwined. She was arrested in 1942 and suffered from heat stroke during police interrogation, sending her health into decline. However, both she and her husband were committed to their cause and never recanted their beliefs.

== Post-war ==
In the post-war period, Miyamoto Yuriko reunited with her husband and resumed Communist political activities. This period was the most prolific in her literary career.

In 1946, Miyamoto wrote "Utagoe yo okore" for the new Japanese Literature Association; this essay urged writers to reflect on the nation's history, their own lived experience, and people's rights. In this essay and others, she advocated for twenty guaranteed rights, of which three would be adopted into the new Japanese Constitution (art. 14 cl. 1 & art. 24 cl. 1-2).

Within a year of the end of the war, she published two companion novels, Banshū heiya (The Banshū Plain) and Fūchisō (The Weathervane Plant), both descriptive of her experiences in the months immediately following the surrender of Japan. The former novel received the Mainichi Cultural Prize for 1947.

=== Later life and death ===
Miyamoto's health declined gradually after her heat stroke in 1942, which had impaired her vision and her heart. She died of sepsis in 1951, shortly after finishing her last novel Dōhyō, as a complication due to acute meningitis. Her grave is at Kodaira Cemetery in Kodaira city on the outskirts of Tokyo.

== Writings ==
Miyamoto's first novel, Nobuko, follows the titular character, who, like Miyamoto, is married in New York and returns to Japan. Her husband claims devotion but speaks differently in his actions, while her mother criticizes the marriage, and Nobuko's creativity dulls until she ultimately joins the proletarian movement and leaves her husband. The novel touches many themes that were hotly contested at the time, including the possibility of "love marriage." The novel is considered mostly autobiographical and was initially received with middling acclaim; however, it enjoyed surprising re-invigoration in the post-war era. Originally seen as a story about a woman seeking self-fulfillment through love and subsequent divorce, it came to be re-interpreted as a story of a woman's liberation from a male-centric life narrative.

Banshū heiya (The Banshū Plain, 1947) is a soberly detailed account of Japan in August and September 1945. The opening chapter of The Banshū Plain depicts the day of Japan's surrender. The setting is a rural town in northern Japan, where Miyamoto, represented by the protagonist Hiroko, was living as an evacuee at the war's end. The chapter captures the sense of confusion with which many Japanese received the news of surrender—Hiroko's brother cannot explain what is happening to his children, while local farmers become drunk. Miyamoto depicts a "moral bankruptcy" which is the major theme of the novel and which is shown as the most tragic legacy of the war.

Fūchisō (The Weathervane Plant, 1947) provides a thinly fictionalized account of Miyamoto's reunion with her husband after his release from twelve years of wartime imprisonment. The couple's adjustment to living together again is shown as often painful. Despite many years of activism in the socialist women's movement, she is hurt when her husband indicates that she has become too tough and too independent after living alone during the war.

Futatsu no niwa (Two Gardens, 1948) and Dōhyō (Signposts, 1950) were written as sequels to Nobuko. The first concerns Nobuko's relationship to her wealthy family and her development as a socialist woman writer, and the second follows Nobuko's divorce and social growth in the Soviet Union. Both novels were criticized by Yuasa Yoshiko, who claimed the novels undermined the significance of female relationships, and some scholars have agreed that the novels are an indictment of Miyamoto and Yuasa's earlier relationship.

Along with her short stories, Miyamoto also published a collection of essays and literary criticism Fujin to Bungaku (Women and Literature, 1947) and a collection of some of the 900 letters between her and her imprisoned husband Juninen no tegami (Letters of Twelve Years, 1950–1952).

== Political and social views ==
Miyamoto was unique in her combination of socialism and feminism. In both movements, she considered it imperative that individuals seeks self-fulfillment. Her debut novel Nobuko explores in detail what it means to seek fulfillment and at what point it might be acceptable to violate social norms and combat "social issues" in its pursuit.

In contrast to many feminists at the time, Miyamoto resisted the advancement of women in "womanly fields." Her work was rejected early in her career from popular women's magazine Fujin Kōron (Women's Forum) for being "too difficult;" however, Miyamoto took it as a compliment, interpreting that her work was "too masculine." She resisted the popular idea of joryū ("feminine writing"), which held that women's and men's writing styles were fundamentally different. After a series of journalistic scandals in women's magazine Seitō ("Bluestockings"), she believed her work would be better able to stand on its literary merit in general-reading magazines.

In contrast to many proletarian writers at the time, who tended to focus on male bonding and the situations of working men, Miyamoto focused on working-class women and the role of female bonding. She considered women's liberation a part of the path to better social order, pushing against both traditional proletarian literature and mainstream Japanese thought.

As a member of the proletarian movement, Miyamoto was anti-imperialist (imperialism being the highest stage of capitalism); however, her work contradicts proletarian stereotypes by featuring urban centers and certain wealthy individuals as civilizing forces for outside groups. Certain of her works also locate revolutionary action within the family unit, contrary to most conceptions of both revolution and liberation at the time.

== Selected works ==
=== Novels ===
- Nobuko (Nobuko, 1928)
- Banshū heiya (The Banshu Plain, 1947)
- Fūchisō (The Weathervane Plant, 1947)
- Futatsu no niwa (The Two Gardens, 1948)
- Dōhyō (Landmark, 1950)

=== Short stories ===
- "Nōson" ("A Farming Village", 1915)
- "Mazushiki hitobito no mure" ("A Flock of Poor People", 1916)
- "Ippon no hana" ("One Flower", 1927)
- "1932-nen no haru" ("The Spring of 1932", 1932)
- "Kokukoku" ("Movement by Movement", 1933)
- "Chibusa" ("The Breasts", 1935)

=== Nonfiction ===
- Utagoe yo, okore: shinnihonbungakukai no yurai ("Raise Your Voice in Song! - Origins of the New Japanese Literature society", 1946)
- Fujin to bungaku (Women and Literature, 1948)
- Jūni nen no tegami (The Letters of Twelve Years, 1952)

== Portrayals of Miyamoto ==
=== Film ===
- Yuriko, Dasvidaniya (2011), theatrical film set in 1924. Directed by Sachi Hamano, it stars Hitomi Toi as Miyamoto Yuriko. The film is based on two of Yuriko's autobiographical novels, Nobuko and Futatsu no niwa, and 1990 non-fiction novel Yuriko, dasuvidāniya : Yuasa Yoshiko no seishun by Hitomi Sawabe. The story depicts the relationship between Miyamoto Yuriko and Yuasa Yoshiko.

== See also ==
- Japanese literature
- List of Japanese authors
