= Mochizuki Yuriko =

Japanese anarchist-feminist (1900–2001)

- 望月百合子
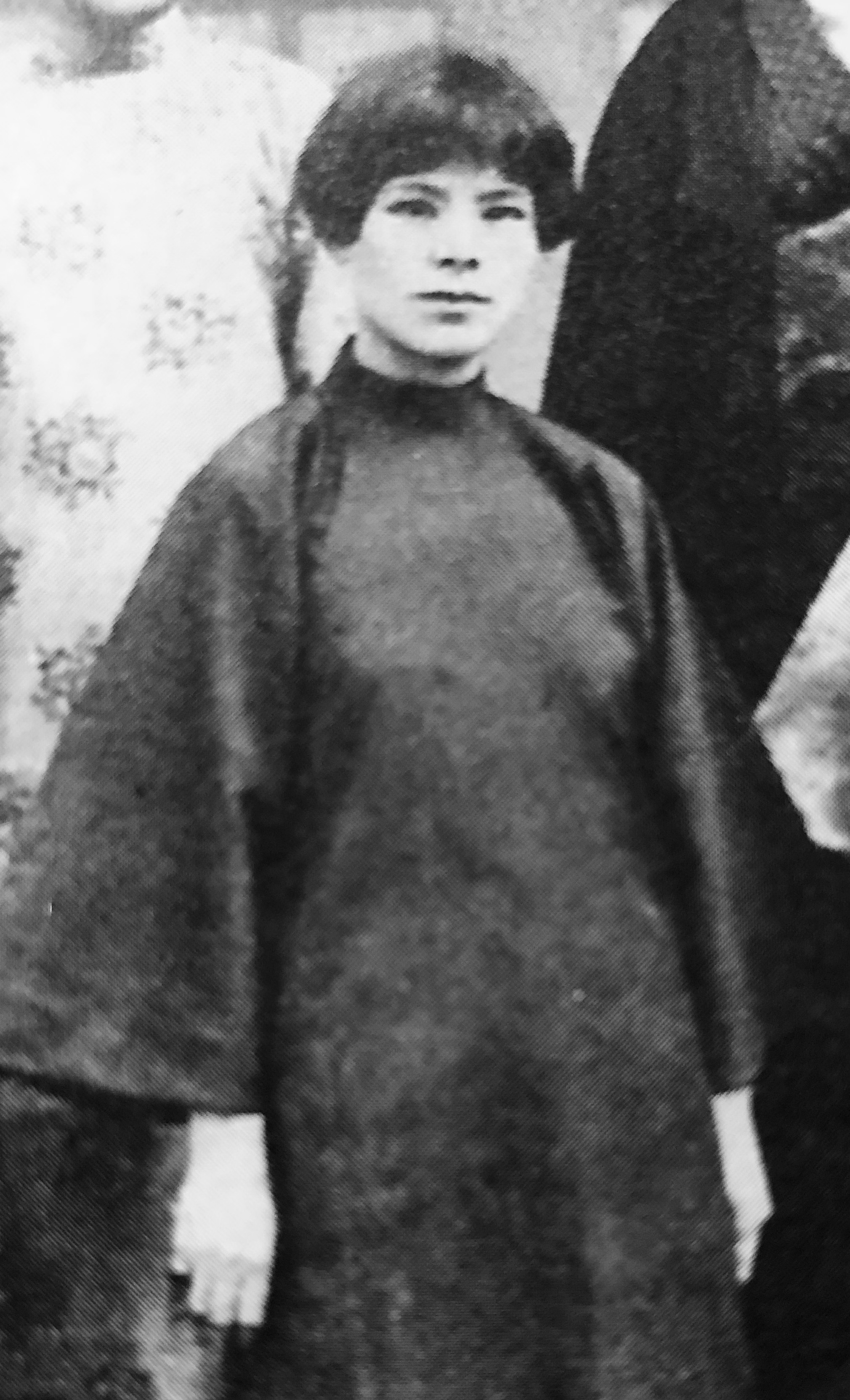
- Born: 5 September 1900; Minamikoma District, Yamanashi Prefecture, Japan
- Died: 9 June 2001 (aged 100); Japan
- Movement: Anarchist feminism

Mochizuki Yuriko (Japanese: 望月百合子; 1900–2001) was a Japanese anarchist-feminist writer and activist. A leading figure in the early Japanese feminist movement, she cut her hair short and advocated for women's suffrage, but eventually split from others in the feminist movement over her political views. She joined up with other anarchist-feminists, including Takamure Itsue, in criticising both Marxist feminism and the antifeminism of male anarchists. Following the Japanese invasion of Manchuria, she and other revolutionary feminists moved to Manchukuo, fleeing political repression in Japan. There she established women's schools and criticised the chauvinism displayed by Japanese settler colonists, although she herself played her own role in the expansionism of the Empire of Japan.

== Biography ==
=== Early life and feminist activism ===
Mochizuki Yuriko was born in 1900.

Having travelled abroad to study in Europe, after World War I ended, she returned to Japan, aspiring to become a novelist. She was one of the first Japanese women that cut her hair short during the 1920s, at a time that the feminist ideal of the "new woman" was gaining traction, although she rejected the label herself. She recalled people reacting with shock and indignation at her new bob cut, especially in her small hometown, where her appearance caused such scandal that she was forced to move to Tokyo. Nevertheless, she continued to insist that women's liberation required that women rid themselves of "encumbering entrapments", from long hair to the kimono, which she believed prevented women's social advancement.

Mochizuki became a major contributor to the feminist journal Nyonin Geijutsu; in its inaugural issue, she advocated for women's suffrage in Japan. She also wrote about her experiences with poverty. She and many of her fellow contributors stopped writing for the journal, due to political differences. They went on to establish the newsletter Kagayaku, which they saw as more in line with the founding principles of their previous publication.

Alongside Takamure Itsue, Mochizuki was one of the leading figures of Japanese anarchist-feminism, who advocated for the abolition of patriarchy and the state. Mochizuki and Takamure participated in debates against Marxist feminists, out of which, in February 1930, they established the anarchist-feminist magazine Fujin sensen (English: The Woman's Front), with Takamure as editor-in-chief. The journal was critical of Marxist feminists, as well as male anarchists, even taking aim the inegalitarian tendencies of Pierre-Joseph Proudhon, Mikhail Bakunin and Peter Kropotkin. At this time, Mochizuki travelled to France, bringing back with her contributions from European anarchist-feminists and writing a biography about the French libertarian Louise Michel.

=== Activities in Manchukuo ===
In the wake of the Mukden incident in 1931, Nyonin Geijutsu was banned from publication. A wave of political repression followed in Japan, forcing many Japanese revolutionaries and left-wing activists to move to Manchukuo, where they attempted to continue their social and political initiatives. Mochizuki and other Kagayaku contributors were among those that relocated to Manchukuo. Mochizuki herself spent 10 years in Manchukuo, where she attempted to establish a "modern utopia". She set up a number of schools, where she taught both Japanese expatriate and native Manchu women; one of her goals being to teach Japanese women the local Manchu language.

Mochizuki was highly critical of Japanese settler colonists in Manchukuo, who segregated themselves from their Manchu neighbours and refused to integrate into Manchurian society. She likewise rejected Japanese complaints that Manchurian women weren't assimilating to Japanese culture, pointing out that many Japanese colonists were young, single men, and thus failed to uphold Japanese cultural ideals on women in society. She wrote of Japanese people that had moved to Xinjing, that "perhaps because the New Capital is small, the Japanese here seem to be as if in a close-up, and we can see the good and the bad."

Historian Masuzō Tanaka placed Mochizuki and her fellow feminist Taiko Hirabayashi at the centre of his analysis of Japanese women's role in the expansionism of the Empire of Japan.

=== Later life and death ===
Mochizuki supported Tsuneko Gauntlett's initiatives to hold a Pan-Pacific Women's Conference in 1937, shortly before the outbreak of the Second Sino-Japanese War.

Mochizuki Yuriko died in 2001.

== Selected works ==
- "Fujin kaihō no michi" ["The Road Toward Women's Liberation"] (Nyonin geijutsu, 1928)
- "Shindanpatsu monogatari" ["A Tale of One's New Paragraph"] (Josei, 1928)
- "Warera no eien Ruizu Misshieru" ["Our Immortal Louise Michel"] (Fujin sensen, 1930)
- "Jiyu to katei" ["Freedom and the Family"] (Fujin sensen, 1930)
- "Shinkyō no josei" ["Women in Xinjing"] (Kagayaku, 1938)
- "Zai Man-Ri xi nüxing tan" ["Discussion of Feminism in Manchukuo and Japan"] (Qingnian wenhua, 1943)

== Bibliography ==
- Coutts, Angela (2006). "Gender and Literary Production in Modern Japan: The Role of Female-Run Journals in Promoting Writing by Women during the Interwar Years". Signs. 32 (1): 167–195. doi:10.1086/505271.
- Coutts, Angela (2012). "Imagining Radical Women in Interwar Japan: Leftist and Feminist Perspectives". Signs. 37 (2): 325–355. doi:10.1086/661713.
- Ericson, Joan E. (1997). Be a Woman: Hayashi Fumiko and Modern Japanese Women's Literature. University of Hawaii Press. ISBN 9780824818845.
- Frederick, Sarah (2013). "Beyond Nyonin Geijutsu, beyond Japan: writings by women travellers in Kagayaku (1933–1941)". Japan Forum. 25 (3): 395–413. doi:10.1080/09555803.2013.804108.
- Kono, Kimberly (2013). "From the 'Nikutai' to the 'Kokutai': Nationalizing the Maternal Body in Ushijima Haruko's 'Woman.'". U.S.-Japan Women's Journal. 45 (45): 69–88. doi:10.1353/jwj.2013.0013. JSTOR 26401953.
- Rosenbaum, Roman (2013). "What kind of place is the new nation of Manchuria? Roundtable talk in Nyonin geijutsu". Japan Forum. 25 (3): 379–394. doi:10.1080/09555803.2013.804111.
- Sato, Barbara Hamill (1993). "The Moga Sensation: Perceptions of the Modan Gāru in Japanese Intellectual Circles During the 1920s". Gender & History. 5 (3): 363–381. doi:10.1111/j.1468-0424.1993.tb00185.x. ISSN 0953-5233.
- Sato, Barbara (2003). The New Japanese Woman: Modernity, Media, and Women in Interwar Japan. Duke University Press. ISBN 9780822330448.
- Smith, Norman (2004). "Disrupting Narratives: Chinese Women Writers and the Japanese Cultural Agenda in Manchuria, 1936-1945". Modern China. 30 (3): 295–325. doi:10.1177/0097700404264508.
- Tsurumi, E. Patricia (1985). "Feminism and anarchism in Japan: Takamure Itsue, 1894–1964". Bulletin of Concerned Asian Scholars. 17 (2): 2–19. doi:10.1080/14672715.1985.10409762.
- Yasutake, Rumi (2009). "The first wave of international women's movements from a Japanese perspective: Western outreach and Japanese women activists during the interwar years". Women's Studies International Forum. 32 (1): 13–20. doi:10.1016/j.wsif.2009.01.009.
- Wang, Xiaodan (2021). "A Literature Study on Japanese Modern Girl". Scientific and Social Research. 3 (3): 173–177. doi:10.36922/ssr.v3i3.1178.
