= Yuriko, Dasvidaniya =

- Theatrical release poster
- 百合子, ダスヴィダーニヤ
- Directed by: Sachi Hamano
- Screenplay by: Kuninori Yamazaki
- Based on: Nobuko by Yuriko Miyamoto Yuriko, dasuvidāniya: Yuasa Yoshiko no seishun by Hitomi Sawabe
- Produced by: Sachi Hamano
- Starring: Nahana; Hitomi Toi; Ren Osugi; Kazuko Yoshiyuki
- Cinematography: Katsuji Koyamada
- Edited by: Naoki Kaneko
- Music by: Shigemi Yoshioka
- Production company: Tantansha
- Distributed by: Tantansha
- Release dates: June 18, 2011 (Shizuoka Milan Theatre, Shizuoka, Japan)
- Running time: 102 minutes
- Country: Japan
- Language: Japanese

Yuriko, Dasvidaniya (百合子、ダスヴィダーニヤ) (Yoshiko & Yuriko) is a 2011 Japanese biographical drama directed by Sachi Hamano.

== Plot ==
Set in 1924, the film follows the relationship between author Yuriko Miyamoto and openly lesbian Russian literature translator Yoshiko Yuasa.

== Cast and characters ==
- Nahana as Yoshiko Yuasa
- Hitomi Toi as Yuriko Miyamoto (née Chūjō)
- Ren Osugi as Shigeru Araki
- Kazuko Yoshiyuki as Yoshie Chūjō
- Yoriko Douguchi as Yaeko Nogami
- Kaho Aso as Sei Kitamura
- Hisako Okata as Un Chūjō
- Tadahiko Hirano as Seiichiro Chūjō

== Development ==
Based partially on the 1928 semi-autobiographical novel Nobuko (伸子 / ) by Yuriko Miyamoto and the 1990 non-fiction novel Yuriko, dasuvidāniya: Yuasa Yoshiko no seishun by Hitomi Sawabe, the little-known true story of the relationship between the two women in the early 20th century was produced in 2010, with filming completed on October 22, 2010.

== Home media ==
The Region 2 DVD of Yuriko, Dasvidaniya (百合子, ダスヴィダーニヤ : Yoshiko & Yuriko) was released in Japan in 2013 by Kabushiki Kaisha Tantansha.

== See also ==
- List of LGBT-related films
- List of LGBT-related films directed by women
