= Ningen (1962 film) =

1962 Japanese film

- Film poster
- 人間
- Directed by: Kaneto Shindō
- Written by: Kaneto Shindō
- Based on: Kaijin maru by Yaeko Nogami
- Starring: Taiji Tonoyama; Nobuko Otowa; Kei Satō
- Cinematography: Kiyomi Kuroda
- Edited by: Mitsuo Kondo
- Music by: Hikaru Hayashi
- Production company: Kindai Eiga Kyokai
- Distributed by: Art Theatre Guild
- Release date: 4 November 1962 (Japan)
- Running time: 116 minutes
- Country: Japan
- Language: Japanese

Ningen (人間), also titled Human, is a 1962 Japanese drama film written and directed by Kaneto Shindō. It is based on the novel Kaijin maru (海神丸) by Yaeko Nogami.

== Plot ==
A ship loses all means of navigation in a storm. The crew becomes increasingly desperate as food and water run out. The captain, Kamegoro, prays to the sailor's god Kompira to rescue them and rations their food and water. His grandson, Sankichi, follows his grandfather, but the other two crew members, Hachizo and Gorosuke rebel and insist on eating their rations of food all at once.

In a vision, Kamegoro sees Kompira, who promises to deliver rain. Then the rain comes and the threat of dying of thirst is gone, but there is no food. Each member of the crew revisits pleasant times, which are recreated as flashbacks in the film. Kamegoro also has less pleasant memories of his war service, where he saw another soldier turn to cannibalism. After weeks of hunger, Hachizo and Gorosuke think of killing and eating Sankichi. They trick him with the promise of food and then kill him with an axe. Kamegoro goes to find him. Hachizo tries to fight but they are both weakened by hunger. Gorosuke repents and begs for forgiveness. They bury Sankichi at sea.

Kamegoro lies to the two remaining crew members that he has had another vision of Kompira, who has blown a ship from San Francisco off course with a typhoon so that it will find them. A ship which genuinely has been blown off course exactly as Kamegoro says then appears. They are rescued. While recovering on the deck of the ship, Gorosuke goes into a mad dance, falls into a cargo hold, and dies. Then Hachizo also commits suicide, leaving only Kamegoro alive.

== Cast ==
- Taiji Tonoyama as Kamegoro
- Nobuko Otowa as Gorozuke
- Kei Satō as Hachizo
- Kei Yamamoto as Sankichi
- Hideo Kanze as Kompira
- Kentaro Kaji as the bosun

== Awards ==
• 1962 Agency for Cultural Affairs Art Festival Award

== Legacy ==
Ningen was screened at the Harvard Film Archive in 2013 as part of its retrospective on the Art Theatre Guild.
