= Yamada Waka =

Japanese feminist (1879–1957)

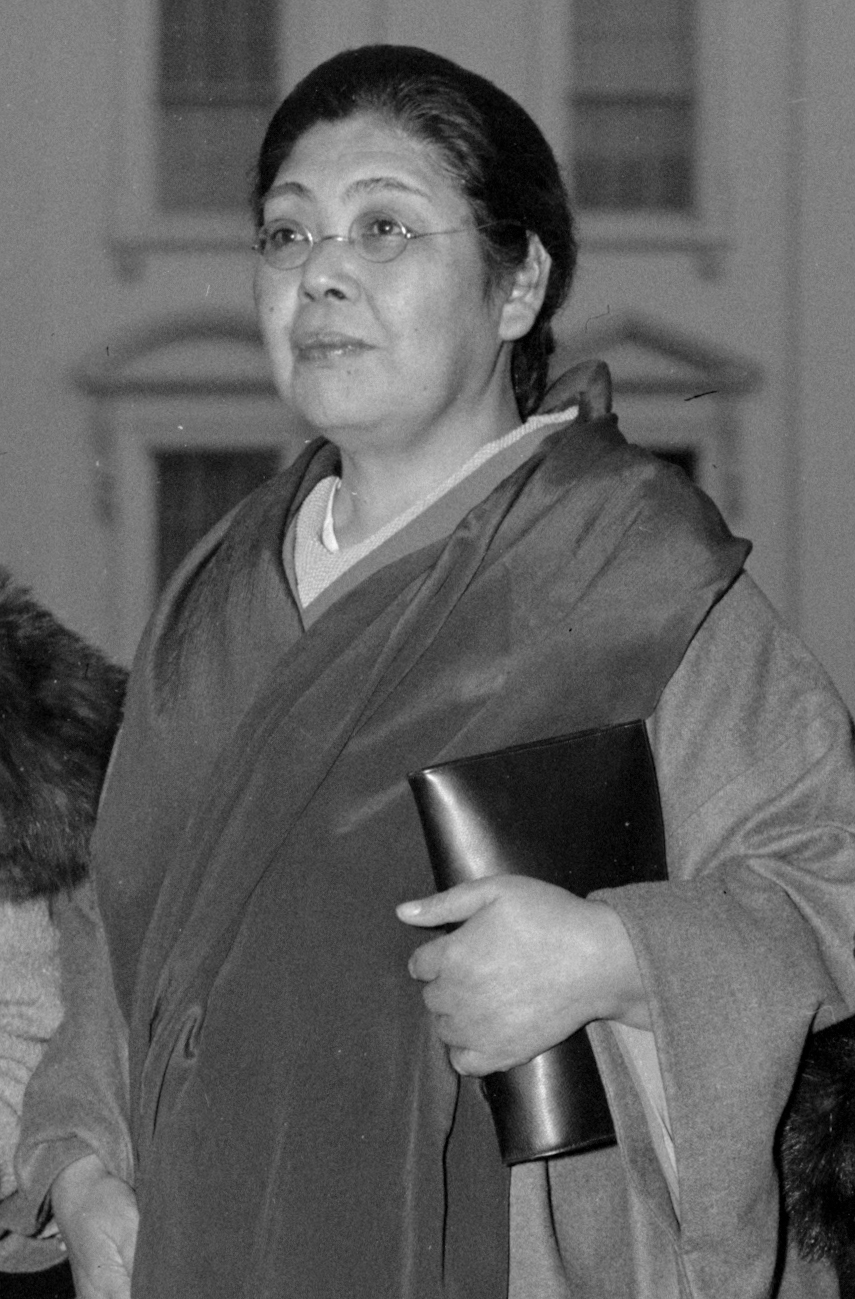
- Yamada visits Eleanor Roosevelt in 1937
- Born: 1 December 1879 Yokosuka, Japan
- Died: 6 September 1957 (aged 77) Tokyo, Japan
- Occupation: Writer, feminist

Yamada Waka (山田 わか; 1 December 1879 – 6 September 1957) was a pioneering Japanese feminist and social reformer, active in the late Meiji period, Taishō and Shōwa periods of Japan.

== Early life ==
Born Asaba Waka in Kurihama Village, Miura County (present day Yokosuka), in Kanagawa Prefecture to a poor peasant family, at age 18, in 1897, she went to nearby Yokohama to look for a job. However, she was kidnapped and ended up being trafficked to Seattle to be a prostitute, becoming known there as "Arabian Oyae". She was held as a sex slave there until 1900, when she met a Japanese journalist, Tachii Nobusaburo or Shinzaburo Ritsui (立井信三郎), who became interested in her plight and helped her to escape to San Francisco. Her erstwhile savior then pimped her out himself, until she fled from him and found Cameron House, a Presbyterian mission set up to help prostitutes escape their plight. She converted to Christianity and worked there while taking English lessons. In 1903, she met Kakichi Yamada (山田嘉吉), a sociologist who ran an English school. They fell in love and married the following year, and in 1906 moved back to Japan.

== Activism ==
They moved to Tokyo's Yotsuya Ward, where she encountered the writings of pioneering Swedish women's rights advocate Ellen Key, who wrote a great deal on motherhood, pregnancy, childbirth, childcare, and the state protecting those roles. In addition, her husband began teaching foreign languages in his school to Osugi Sakae, who then introduced Waka to Hiratsuka Raicho’s magazine, "Bluestocking". Yamada then embarked upon a career of fighting for women’s rights. She became one of the most prominent members of the Japanese women’s movement, including being a frequent contributor to "Bluestocking" ("Seito"). She made known her own victimization as a prostitute, despite the social stigma associated with such an admission. She had a regular "women's" column in the newspaper "Asahi Shimbun". She became the Japanese translator for Olive Schreiner.

She differed from many other Japanese feminists of the era in that her central interest was in protecting and elevating women's roles as wife and mother. This goal was similar to that of her ideological inspiration, Ellen Key, and it also put her goals in line with the goals of imperial Japan, which advocated the importance of good wives and wise mothers, and had a very pro-natalist ideology in order to encourage children to support the war. This attitude put her at odds with most of the other feminists of the day, many of whom were not supporters of the Japanese imperial goals, and who emphasized more equality with men without being as concerned about the roles of wife and mother. Yamada advocated for a "Maternal and Child Protection Act", which culminated in the founding of the New Women's Association (Shin Fujin Kyokai). In 1934, she founded the Women's League (soon renamed the Maternity Protection League (Bosei Hogo Renmei)) and became its chair.

Her prominence was such that when she visited the United States for a lecture tour, she was invited to visit Eleanor Roosevelt at the White House, which she did on December 7, 1937. In 1938, she opened the first shelter for women and children fleeing abusive homes in Japan.

Following the end of World War II, she was upset to see state-supported prostitution created for American servicemen then occupying Japan. While the state-supported brothels were soon closed, there remained many prostitutes on the streets in the chaotic times after the war, many having lost their homes and families in the war. In response to this, Yamada opened a school in Tokyo much like Cameron House, in 1947, designed to help Japanese prostitutes escape their situation by learning valuable skills.

== In fiction ==
In the graphic novel Sous le soleil de minuit, published in 2015 by writer Juan Díaz Canales and artist Rubén Pellejero, a fictionalized version of Waka Yamada is "rescued" by Corto Maltese in 1915 in Dawson, Alaska where she was "retained by a madam on behalf of a Japanese syndicate."

== See also ==
- Japanese feminism
