= Yagi Akiko =

Japanese writer and anarchist (1895–1983)

- 八木あき
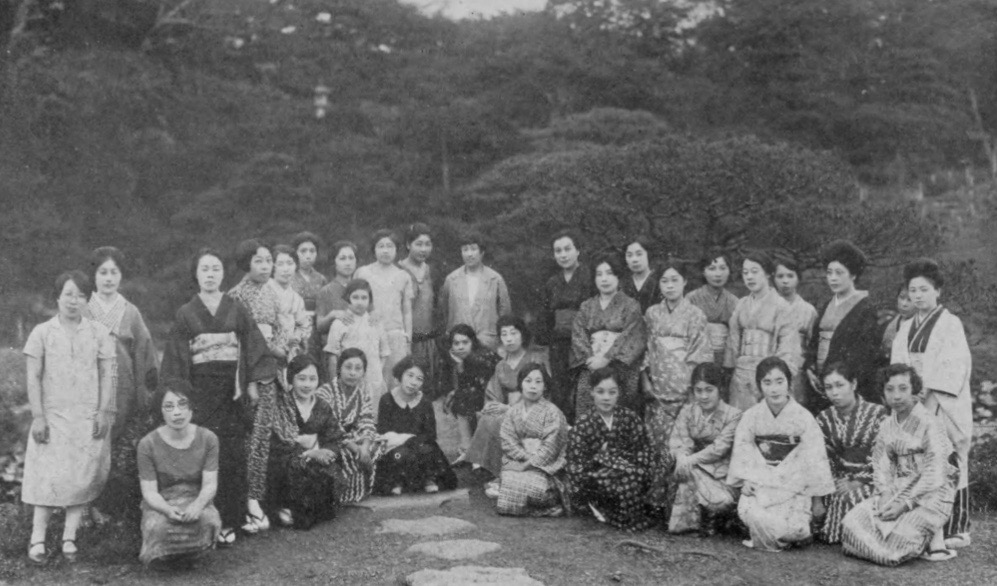
- Yagi (front row, far-left) at the launch party of Nyonin Geijutsu in 1929
- Born: 6 September 1895; Kiso, Nagano Prefecture, Japan
- Died: 30 April 1983 (aged 87)
- Occupation: Writer

Yagi Akiko (Japanese: 八木あき; 6 September 1895 – 30 April 1983) was a Japanese anarchist-feminist journalist, literary critic and activist. She began writing for left-wing literary journals in the early 1920s and joined the editorial staff of the women's literary magazine Nyonin Geijutsu in 1928. As a leading anarchist voice at the journal, she criticized Marxist literary critics for focusing their reviews on a work's perceived accordance with their own ideology, causing a split among its writing staff. Together with fellow anarchist Takamure Itsue, she established the anarcha-feminist magazine Fujin sensen in 1930, within which she criticized capitalism, the state and Japanese imperialism. She later quit writing to focus on agrarian activism.

== Biography ==
=== Early life and work ===
Yagi Akiko was born in 1895. Growing up, she was influenced by works published in the women's literary journal Joshi bundan from 1905 to 1913, and was inspired to become a journalist. In 1917, Yagi moved to Tokyo. She soon became a prominent literary figure in the early Japanese socialist movement, publishing the left-wing arts journal Tanemaku hito between 1921 and 1923. Over the course of the 1920s, she became sympathetic to the political philosophy of anarchism and wrote of her opposition to the systems and values propagated by the ruling class of Imperial Japan.

=== Nyonin Geijutsu ===
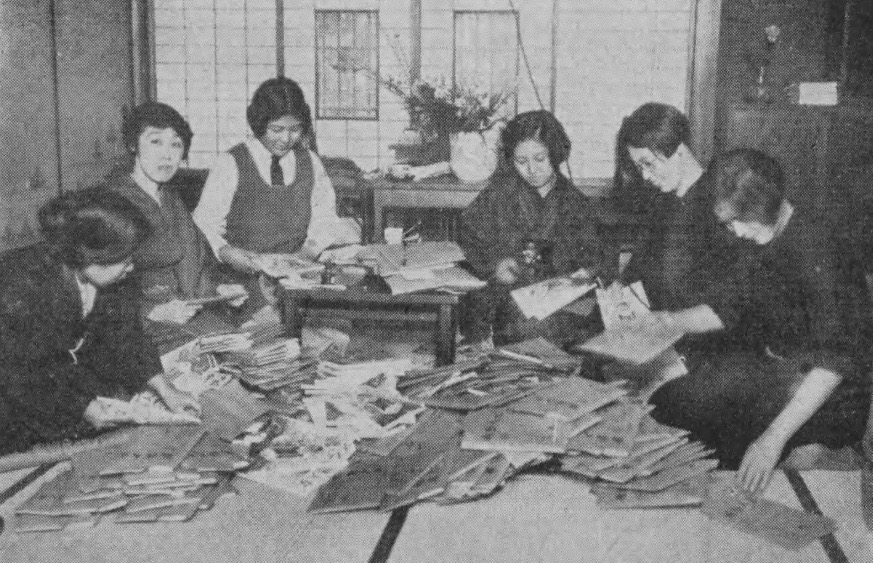
Yagi (second from right) at the editorial office of Nyonin Geijutsu

In 1928, the socialist feminist Hasegawa Shigure established a new women's literary magazine Nyonin Geijutsu, and invited Yagi to join its editorial staff; she would become the main figure behind the publication during its first two years. The paper's writers demanded a new cultural space for women, so that they would no longer "be treated like live mannequins"; Yagi described the use of women in department store windows as the "most extreme example of the commodification of a human being as an item for sale". Her travelogue "Letters from a Trip to Kyushu", written with Fumiko Hayashi, tells of their drinking and meeting men, as two modern women outré for the time period.

In 1929, a literary debate between Yagi and Fujimori Seikichi escalated into a political conflict between the paper's anarchist and Marxist factions. Yagi denied the compatibility of anarchism and Marxism, for which Fujimori criticized her as "petite bourgeois". Yagi opposed the Marxist literary critics who insisted that all literature had to be judged based on their accordance with Marxist ideology, which she considered to be a form of intellectual elitism. She believed the masses had no interest in such ideological discussions and called for writers to speak with their own voice, rather than basing their writing on ideological prescriptions. She therefore refused to review literature based on its ideology, worrying that such a review would preclude genuine emotional reactions and connection to material reality. She considered it foolish to "entrust one's enthusiasm for class conflict to the arts". Several more anarchist feminists, including Takamure Itsue, and Marxist feminists, including Ichiko Kamichika, joined the debate. Angela Coutts concludes that the split in the journal weakened Japanese feminism.

=== Fujin sensen ===
Over the subsequent months, this "anarchist-bolshevist debate" (Japanese: ana-boro ronsō) culminated with Yagi and Takamure breaking away from the Marxists to establish their own anarchist paper. Together, in 1930, they founded Fujin sensen (English: Women's Front), which became the main competitor of the Marxist Nyonin Geijutsu and gained a circulation of 5,000. Concerned by the effects of the Great Depression in Japan, Yagi began writing about politics and economics in the magazine. She criticized the state, capitalism and the family.

In one article, published in April 1930, Yagi criticized the enforced collectivization in the Soviet Union and violent repression of the peasantry under Stalin. In another, published in May 1930, she explored the oppression of women under capitalism, comparing the poor working conditions of women in the Japanese textile industry to slavery in the United States and the exploitation of Chinese workers in the Shanghai International Settlement. She also highlighted the role that social reproduction played in the oppression of working women. When the Japanese puppet state of Manchukuo was established in 1932, Yagi was quick to denounce it, comparing it to a slave state and calling for people to oppose Japanese imperialism. However, the Japanese left failed to present a united opposition to Japanese imperialist expansion.

=== Later life ===
Having herself been criticized for her involvement in Fujin sensen by the Farmers' Youth League, Yagi left the magazine after its third issue. She returned to the countryside, where she became involved in activism and direct action, for which she was arrested and imprisoned. Yagi Akiko died in 1983.

== Bibliography ==
- Coutts, Angela (2013). "How do we write a revolution? Debating the masses and the vanguard in the literary reviews of Nyonin geijutsu". Japan Forum. 25 (3): 362–378. doi:10.1080/09555803.2013.804106.
- Germer, Andrea (2000). "Continuity and Change in Japanese Feminist Magazines: Fujin sensen (1930-31) and Onna erosu (1973-82)". In Wöhr, Ulrike; Hamill Sato, Barbara; Suzuki, Sadami (eds.). Gender and Modernity: Rereading Japanese Women's Magazines. International Research Center for Japanese Studies. pp. 101–130. ISSN 0915-2822. OCLC 1540390647. Archived from the original on 19 September 2024.
- Mackie, Vera (2003). Feminism in Modern Japan: Citizenship, Embodiment and Sexuality. Cambridge University Press. ISBN 978-0-521-52719-4.
- Matsumura, Wendy (2017). "More than the "Wife Corps": Female Tenant Farmer Struggle in 1920s Japan". International Labor and Working-Class History (91): 127–155. doi:10.1017/S0147547916000302.
- Silverberg, Miriam (1991). "The Modern Girl as Militant". In Bernstein, Gail Lee (ed.). Recreating Japanese Women, 1600-1945. University of California Press. ISBN 978-0-520-07017-2.
