= Hanayo Ikuta =

Japanese writer

- 生田 花世
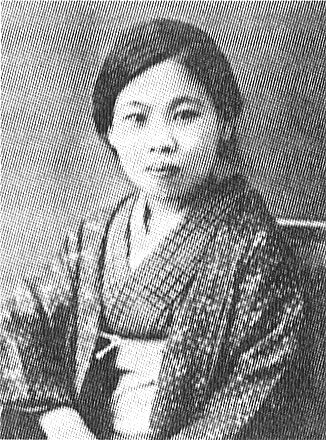
- Hanayo Ikuta as a young woman
- Born: Nishizaki Hanayo; 14 October 1888; Izumiya Village, Tokushima Prefecture
- Died: 8 December 1970 (age 82)
- Other names: Kikuko Chosokabe (pseudonym)
- Occupation(s): Writer, editor, educator, feminist

Hanayo Ikuta (14 October 1888 – 8 December 1970) (in Japanese, 生田 花世), born Nishizaki Hanayo, was a Japanese feminist writer, editor, and educator.

== Early life ==
Hanayo Nishizaki was born in Izumiya Village, Itano District, Tokushima Prefecture, the daughter of Yasutaro Nishizaki. She was a student at the Tokushima Prefectural Girls' High School, and trained to be a teacher.

== Career ==
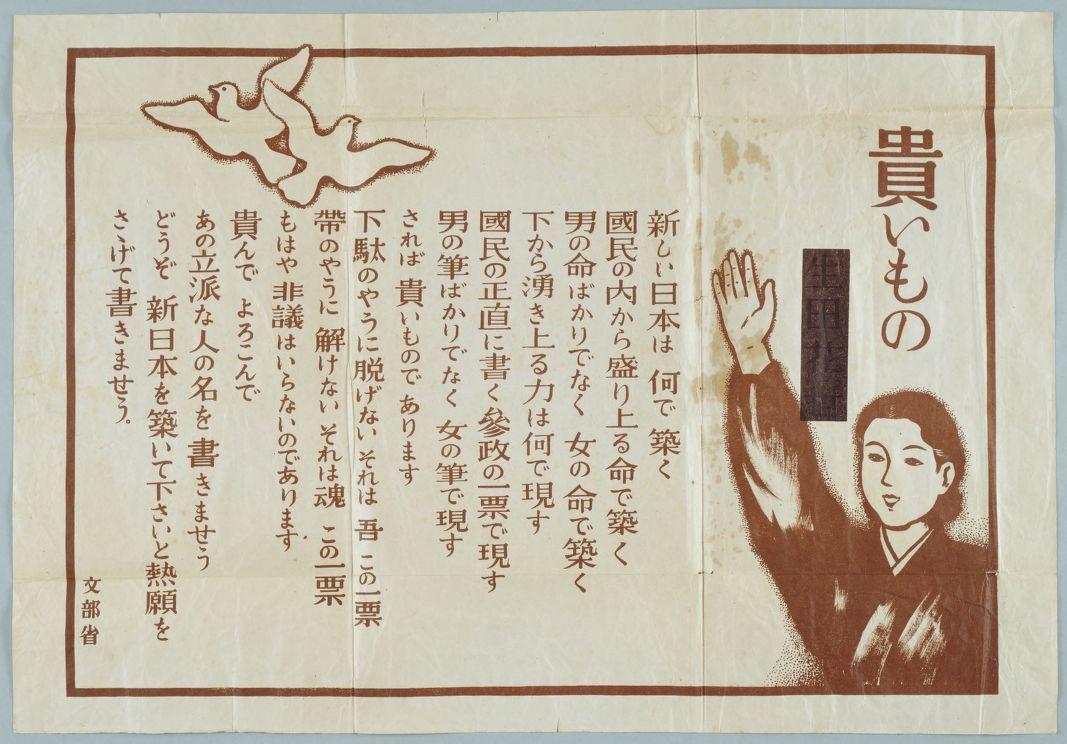
A 1946 government poster urging women to vote, featuring a quote by Hanayo Ikuta

Ikuta wrote for magazines beginning in her teens, and was an elementary school teacher as a young woman. She moved to Tokyo in 1910, after her father died. Ikuta edited and wrote for literary magazines and women's periodicals, including Seitō (Bluestocking), Beatrice, Nyonin Geijutsu, and Women and Labor. She wrote cultural reviews, including a 1914 review of a Japanese performance of George Bernard Shaw's Mrs. Warren's Profession, and first-person essays on womanhood, including essays on the "chastity debates". Her 1914 article, "On Hunger and Chastity", asked, "Is it possible for a female clerk to earn a livelihood and yet also not worry about being able to perfectly protect her precious chastity?" She concludes that the family, social, and economic structures of early 20th-century Japan forced some women to choose between life and respectability, by excluding women with no other support from property ownership and professions.

Ikuta published a book of poetry in 1917, and a novel in the early 1920s. In the 1930s she visited Japanese troops in Taiwan, and wrote about Manchurian cuisine. During World War II she was a government worker, before she was burned in an air raid. After the war, she led literary discussions for women, and published a popular edition of The Tale of Genji. A quote by Ikuta was used on a poster for the 1946 general election, encouraging women to vote.

== Personal life ==
She married writer Ikuta Shungetsu and used his family name. Her husband died by suicide in 1930. She died in 1970, at the age of 82.
