= Okanoue Kikue =

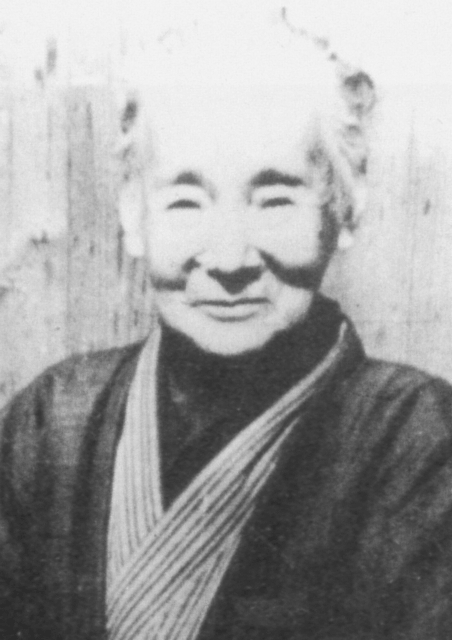

Okanoue Kikue (岡上 菊栄)(Born 1867, died 1947) ran an orphanage in Kōchi, Japan

It is said she was the niece of Sakamoto Ryōma. Her mother is said to have been, Otome, (Sakamoto's older sister) and her father was Jyuan, a doctor. When Kikue was two years old, their families lost contact and so she didn't have much contact with Sakamoto. To this day their actual relationship remains controversial.

When she was five, her father died and she was left to live at her uncle's house in Kagami Village. At the age of 14, she entered Kōchi's "Eiwa Women's School" run by Annie Dowd of Missouri, USA. After that she became a teacher and worked as an elementary school teacher for 21 years. After that, she became the head teacher of a Kōchi Hakuaien orphanage. She raised her own five children along with the orphans in the school. She devoted her whole life to this cause, but at the time, she wasn't well understood by society. She raised 356 children. The orphanage she ran stood at the site of the current Shin Hankyu Hotel in Honmachi, Kōchi City, but was destroyed during the Kōchi fire bombing of July 4, 1945.
