= Seitō (magazine) =

Japanese feminist magazine

Seitō (Bluestocking)
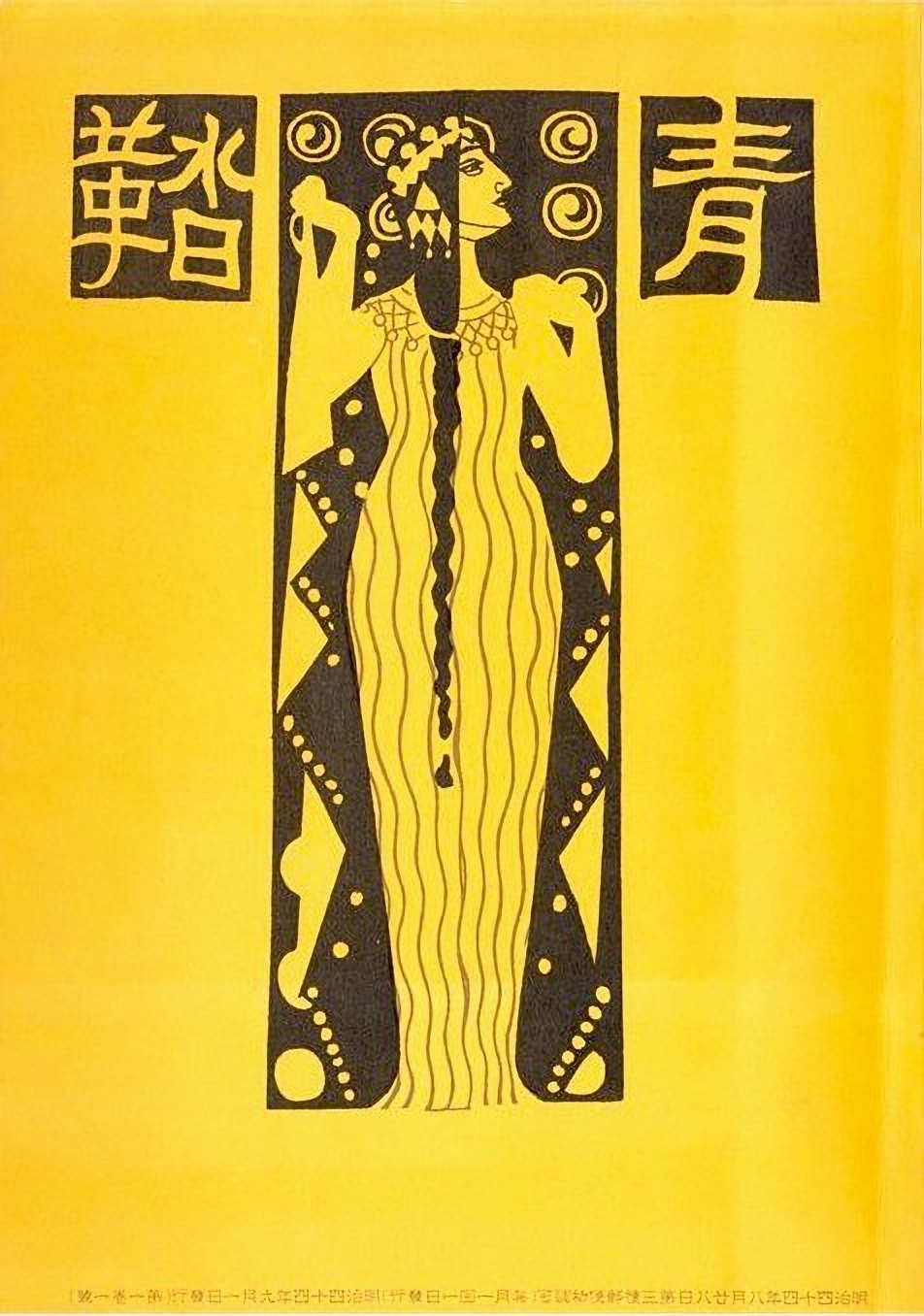
- The first issue of Seitō with cover illustration by Chieko Naganuma
- Editor: Raichō Hiratsuka; Noe Ito
- Categories: Newsmagazine
- First issue: September 1911
- Final issue: February 1916
- Country: Japan
- Language: Japanese

Seitō (Japanese: 青鞜), also known by its translated title Bluestocking, was a literary magazine created in 1911 by a group of five women: Haru Raichō Hiratsuka, Yasumochi Yoshiko, Mozume Kazuko, Kiuchi Teiko, and Nakano Hatsuko. The group called themselves the Japanese Bluestocking Society (青鞜社 Seitō-sha) and used the magazine to promote the equal rights of women through literature and education. The magazine they developed was designed to articulate women's self-awareness and the gender-based societal limitations they faced, but its promotion of early feminist beliefs through controversial publications caused it to be banned by the Japanese Home Ministry for being "disruptive to society". Members of The Bluestockings were berated by the press, and their private lives were a source of outrage for the public. Bluestocking produced 52 issues with over 110 contributors. It is credited as an influence for modern Japanese feminism.

== Etymology ==
The name of the publication is a reference to the Blue Stockings Society of mid-18th century England, where women would gather for academic discussions about literature and philosophy to forgo social evenings spent playing cards and dancing, and would often invite intellectual men to join them. The original English Bluestocking Society is credited with starting first-wave feminism and its name has been adopted to represent various feminist movements all over the world. Universally, the term is associated with feminist theory, women's education, and intelligent debate. Japanese references to the English Bluestocking movement was originally called Kontabito. However, this word felt dated to Hiratsuka as tabi were worn less frequently than western socks. Unlike their English counterparts, members of The Bluestockings generally did not wear blue socks.

The Japanese word for Bluestocking, 青鞜, or Seitō, was created by Hiratsuka Raichō with the assistance of Ikuta Chōkō, by combining the Kanji "sei" for "blue" and the character "tō" for "stocking."

== Historical background ==
The Meiji era's desire to "catch up with the west" led to a number of changes in law and household structure. The government implemented a family-state with the Emperor as the head of the "family" in order to foster nationalism. New reforms instituted legal codes that required a patriarchal head-of-house, ensuring that even the lowest male member of the household always had more legal power than any female member. Marriage meant that wives lost authority over their property. Political participation was banned for women. Industrialisation meant that more workers needed to be produced and new laws reflected that need. Adultery for men was excused but adultery for women was now a 2-year jail-able offence. Abortion was criminalised and divorce, while technically possible, was a source of great shame. The result was an era that was especially contentious towards women.

Daughters of the affluent enjoyed an increase in girls schools, constructed to produce women that were "good wives, wise mothers." The academic content in these schools was of lower calibre than the male equivalent but it did produce literate middle-class women, creating a market for women's magazines. Popular magazines such as Shinnjokai (New Women's World), Fujin-Club (Women's Club), and Shufuno-tomo (Friends for Housewives) predated Bluestocking and mainly discussed how women could become more ideal mothers, work harder as wives, or incorporate Christian values into their lives.

Although it is suggested that the Bluestockings are responsible for the Japanese women's movement, there are groups and movements that predate them. The Meiji 6 Society was one such group, which criticised Japanese governmental and social policies that undervalued women as keeping Japan from advancing to the world stage. The Freedom and People's Rights Movement came after the Meiji 6 and supported women's suffrage. They even accepted women from different social classes into their ranks (of which future Bluestocking contributor Fukuda Hideko was a member of), whereas the Meiji 6 only accepted formally-educated upper-class men. Additionally, women writers like Ichiyo Higuchi had been using their higher education to raise the consciousness of other women as early as the 1890s.

Earlier in the same year that the first edition of Bluestocking was released, International Women's Day was celebrated globally for the first time, two incidents of love-suicides involving lesbians circulated in newspapers across Japan, and the biggest actress in Tokyo, Matsui Sumako, performed the role of Nora Helmer in A Doll's House.

== Magazine contents ==
The writing contained in Bluestocking was complex and diverse ranging from pieces spanning many genres written by Japanese women to translations of pertinent Western texts. Through its 52 issues, it covered all forms of writing popular in Japanese literature at the time such as essays, plays, short stories, haiku, waka, I novel, as well as experimental forms of writing. It featured translations of Western writers such as Anton Chekhov, Guy de Maupassant, Edgar Allan Poe, Havelock Ellis, Lester Ward, Emma Goldman, Ellen Key, Sonya Kovalesky, Olive Schreiner, Henrik Ibsen, Charlotte Perkins Gilman, Mary Wollstonecraft, Hermann Sudermann, George Bernard Shaw, Frank Wedekind, and more.

Subjects covered included the "New Woman" concept, rape, prostitution, arranged marriage, abortion, class struggle, incarceration, adultery, motherhood, childcare, sociological theory, anarchist theory, motivational calls-to-action, and more. Responses and debates between members on these subjects and the featured translations could be found in the issues as well.

== History ==
=== 1911–1914 (Hiratsuka Era) ===
Bluestocking's first edition was released in September 1911. The first issue sold 1,000 copies in the first month and the editorial office received over 3,000 letters in that time asking for subscriptions and personal advice. The founders of Bluestocking were recent graduates of the newly established Japan Women's University. Led by Hiratsuka Raichō, Japan's first all-women literary magazine was developed out of inspiration from the writings of Swedish feminist author Ellen Key and the intelligent and domestic heroine of Henrik Ibsen's A Doll's House, Nora Helmer. Her intent was to start a women's spiritual revolution by examining how women had lost their spiritual independence over time.

Hiratsuka penned a manifesto for the society publication, spelling out its purpose:

Our group has as its objective the birth of a feminine literature. We are animated by an ardent sincerity and our ambition is to express and produce feminine genius; we will succeed through a concentration of spirit. That genius, which is of mysterious essence is an important part of universal genius, which has no sex! When Japan was born, woman was the sun, the true human being. Now she is the moon! She lives in the light on a mother star. This is the first cry of the Bluestockings! We are the mind and the hand of the woman of new Japan. We expose ourselves to men's laughter, but know that which is hidden that mockery. Let us reveal our hidden sun, our recognized genius! Let it come from behind the clouds! That is the cry of our faith, of our personality, of our instinct, which is the master of all the instincts. At that moment, we will see the shining throne of our divinity.

Early contributors included beloved poet Akiko Yosano and author Nobuko Yoshiya. Yosano's words penned for the first issue became a battle-cry for the Japanese feminist movement:

The day has arrived when the mountains are about to become active. People do not believe me when I say this: The mountains have simply been dormant for a while ... Believe only this: Now all the women who lay dormant are rousing themselves.

The first years of the magazine were groundbreaking for both the feminist movement and women's literature. Many members referred to themselves as "New Women." While the media used this term negatively, many of the Bluestockings embraced this new title. Though originally focusing on women's literature, the magazine soon shifted focus towards women's liberation, and the pages of Bluestocking were filled with essays and editorials on the question of gender equality and gender-based social problems.

=== 1915–1916 (Itō Era) ===
The publication received a steady increase in government opposition and threats. Despite attempts to censor it, Bluestocking continued to publish unfiltered social commentaries. At its height in 1915, the magazine was selling 3000 copies a month.

Hiratsuka turned editorial control over to Itō Noe in 1915. While Bluestocking had been slowly becoming more politicized since its inception, Itō Noe was an anarchist responsible for filling Bluestocking with more aggressive opinions about women's rights. For almost a year, Itō ran the magazine, making contribution by readers more accessible and placing a greater emphasis on societal problems. The last issue was published in February 1916. The journal folded due to a lack of sales, which was caused by the Japanese Home Ministry threatening to fine any distributors for carrying the magazine, which was deemed a threat to the Japanese polity.

The publication was forced to close, but not before establishing itself as a leader in Japan's women's movement.

== Controversies ==
The writings of Bluestocking quickly caught the attention of the Japanese Home Ministry because of the magazine's explicit criticism of Japan's private capital system. The government censored the magazine for its upfront depiction of female sexuality, going as far as to ban and remove the magazine from the shelves. Prominent educator Ishigaki Iyako called the Bluestockings a blight upon society and urged her female students to abscond from their ideals.

=== 1911–1914 (Hiratsuka Era) ===
The very first issue was banned for a short story dealing with the break-up of arranged marriage and the April 1912 edition was banned for an erotic short story where a woman remembered having sex the previous night with a man she met at a tavern. The outright expression of female sexuality shocked its audience. The story was called "The Letter" written by one of the members, Araki Ikuko.

In the summer of 1912, two incidents were perceived as threats to kokutai. The "5-Colour Liqueur Incident" and the "Trip to Yoshiwara" both revolved around contributor and artist Otake Kokichi, who, over two issues, wrote about liqueur as though she had consumed it. She also implied was Hiratsuka's young lover. Soon after, Otake's uncle bought members of the Bluestockings admission to the red-light district as he thought they should be aware of women purchased for prostitution. Otake later told a magazine about these women, but this only served to paint the Bluestockings as "New Women" who drink alcohol, engage in same-sex love, and freely enter districts meant only for men.

While the Bluestockings members saw themselves as serious intellectuals, these incidents cemented them as regular subjects in Tokyo newspapers and every aspect of their personal lives was criticised and mocked. Love affairs, children out of wedlock, and divorces were all seen as shameful by society, and the press publicised it all. While many of The Bluestockings used this opportunity to speak frankly to their readers about their experiences and choices, others were not pleased with the societal pressure. With marriage prospects, job opportunities, and familial pressure on the line, many members resigned by 1913.

The April 1913 issue was banned for an article calling for women to marry for love. The February 1914 edition was banned for a short story where a woman flees an arranged marriage only to be betrayed by her lover.

During this era, members of the Bluestocking Society were translating plays about gender and sexologists' definitions of lesbianism, which increased public anxieties about lesbian love. At the time, the prevalent discourse on female same-sex desire was that it was "revolting" and "ill". These facts combined meant that the media heavily attacked the lesbian relationships of some of the writers of Bluestocking, such as Hiratsuka Raicho, Otake Kokichi, Tamura Toshiko, and Naganuma Chieko.

=== 1915–1916 (Itō Era) ===
The June 1915 edition of Bluestocking was banned for an article calling for abortion to be legalized in Japan and the authorities' restriction of the magazine became much more harsh. Local bookstores were pressured by the government to stop carrying Bluestocking all together after censors banned entire publishing runs as "injurious to public morals". To make such charges stick, the authorities provoked public attention, which in turn resulted in police inquiries, which brought shame to the member's families and instigated fear of losing marriage proposals and employment opportunities.

== Members and contributors ==
Throughout its 5 year run, Seitō had over 110 members and contributors. As a submission-based magazine, writers were free to submit their work for review and publication. Supporting Members were recruited at the founding of the society as female authorities on literature and were the wives or sisters of eminent Japanese authors. Members (and Supporting Members) paid 30 sen (1 sen being 1/100th yen) a month to contribute to the magazine's upkeep, though they also received that month's issue. Many of the "Members" quit as of 1913 due to backlash, however, there were those who joined because of the backlash.

=== Founders ===
- Hiratsuka Raichō
- Kiuchi Teiko
- Mozume Kazuko
- Nakano Hatsuko
- Yasumochi Yoshiko (pen name Yasumochi Hakuu)

=== Supporting members ===
- Hasegawa Shigure
- Kato Kazuko
- Koganei Kimiko (not listed in "The Guiding Principles of the Bluestockings", 1911)
- Kunikida Haruko
- Mori Shigeko
- Okada Yachiyo
- Yosano Akiko

=== Members ===
- Akune Toshiko
- Aoki Jōko
- Araki Ikuko
- Asano Tomo
- Chino Masako
- Harada Satsuki (née Yasuda)
- Hayase Chitose
- Itō Noe (eventual Bluestockings editor after 1914)
- Iwabuchi Yuri
- Iwano Kiyoko
- Kanzaki Tsuneko
- Katano Tama
- Katō Midori
- Kobayashi Katsu
- Ogasawara Sada
- Omura Kayoko
- Makino Kimie
- Mikajima Yoshi
- Mizuno Senko
- Nishizaki Hanayo
- Nogami Yaeko
- Ogasawara Sada
- Ojima Kikuko
- Okamoto Kanoko
- Otake Masako
- Tahara Yūko
- Tamura Toshiko
- Tozawa Hatsuko
- Sakamoto Makoto
- Sakuma Tokiko
- Shibata Kayo
- Sugimoto Masao
- Ueda Kimiko
- Yamamoto Ryūko

=== Notable contributors ===
- Fukuda Hideko — her article "The Solution to the Woman Question" caused sales of the Feb 1913 issue to be prohibited.
- Ikuta Chōkō — Hiratsuka's college and adviser to the magazine.
- Yamada Waka
- Yoshiya Nobuko — prolific author of early "lesbian" fiction

== Legacy ==
The magazine was never translated into English during the time of its publication as international works were highly censored. The kokutai believed the controversial content of Bluestocking would bring shame to the Japanese male establishment if published abroad.

While the publication was never revamped, different members continued to be activists for women's rights. For example, from 1919-1922, Hiratsuka Raicho, after recruiting educator Ichikawa Fusae and student Oku Mumeo, founded Shin Fujin Kyokai (New Women's Association), an organization which fought for extra divorce rights, equal political participation, and women's right to vote. On top of this, after Bluestocking started the trend, major publishers like Chūō Kōron, Taiyō, and other women's magazines released issues about the inequalities women faced while using less radical tones, reflective of the general trend towards a more democratic society in the Taishō Period.

After the end of the publication of Bluestocking, women's rights organizations fought for suffrage and against fascism, but they were soon muffled by growing nationalistic and militaristic values pre-World War II that called for a resurgence in the "good wife, wise mother" standard for women. While the 1947 Constitution gave women legal rights, women still faced a double standard in society that Second Wave Feminists have been combating since the 1960s, many taking inspiration from Bluestocking.

== See also ==
- Hiratsuka Raichō — founding member, editor-in-chief from 1911–1914, and early Japanese Feminist.
- Itō Noe — editor-in-chief from 1915-1916 and famous Japanese anarcha-feminist.
- New Woman — called "atarashii onna," it is also an ideal among members/a source of derision from critics.
- Bluestocking society — the 18th century English namesake origin of the Japanese Bluestocking society and literary magazine.
- List of Japanese women writers — several members of Bluestocking are also listed here.
- Japanese Feminism — the full history of the Feminist movement in Japan to give context to how Bluestocking fits in.
