= Hiratsuka Raichō =

Japanese anarchist and feminist writer (1886–1971)

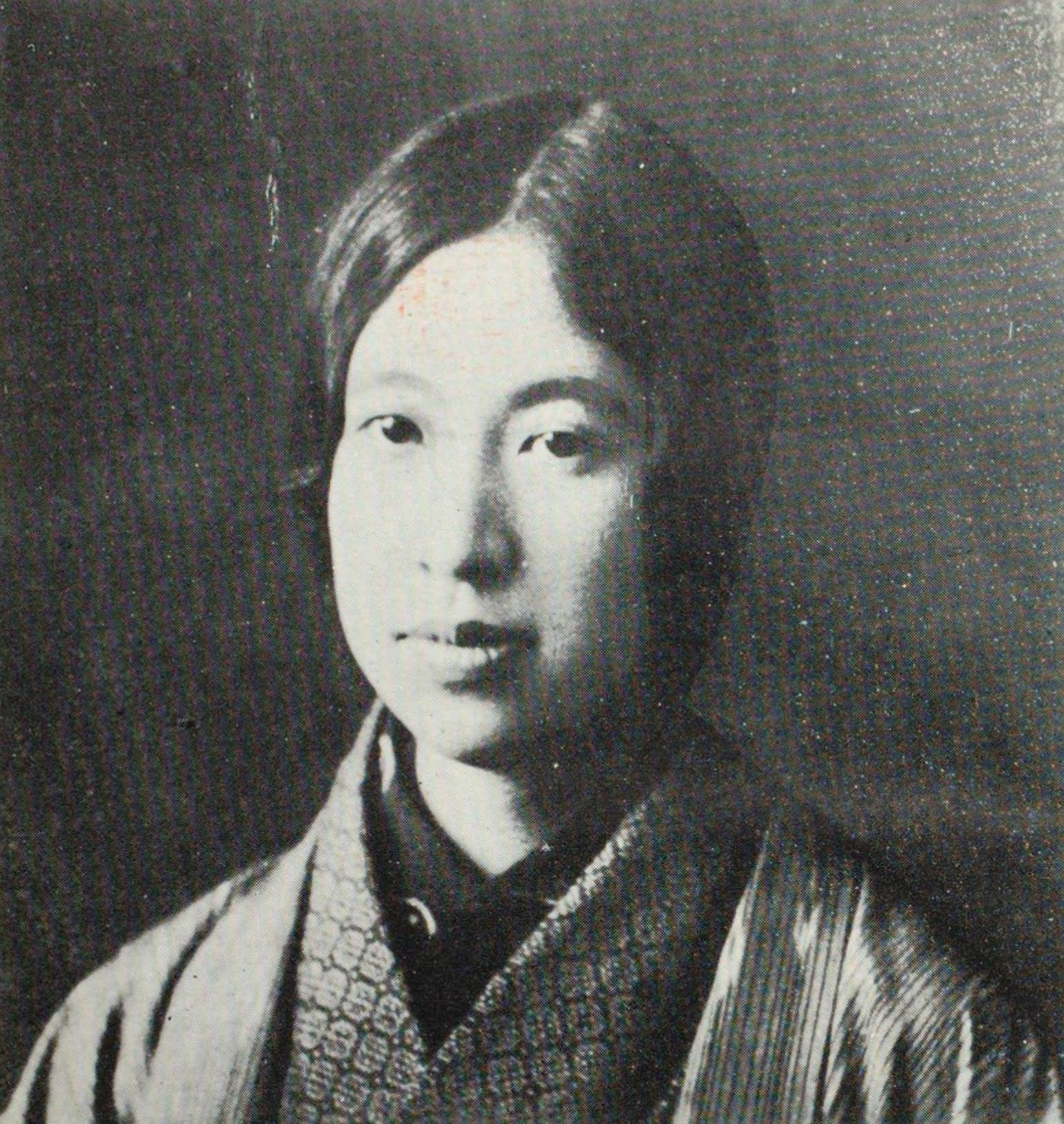
- Raichō, from her autobiography
- Born: Hiratsuka Haru; February 10, 1886; Sanbanchō, Tokyo, Empire of Japan
- Died: May 24, 1971 (aged 85); Sendagaya, Shibuya, Tokyo, Japan

Hiratsuka Raichō (平塚 らいちょう, transliterated らいてう according to the historical kana orthography; born Hiratsuka Haru, 平塚 明; February 10, 1886 – May 24, 1971) was a Japanese writer, journalist, political activist, anarchist, and pioneering feminist in Japan.

== Life ==
Born in Tokyo in 1886, the second daughter of a high ranking civil servant, and educated at Japan Women's University (日本女子大学) in 1903, Hiratsuka came to be influenced by contemporary currents of European philosophy, as well as Zen Buddhism, of which she would become a devoted practitioner. Of particular influence to her was turn-of-the-century Swedish feminist writer Ellen Key, some of whose works she translated into Japanese, and the individualistic heroine of Henrik Ibsen's A Doll's House (1879). Hiratsuka was also interested in the works of Baruch Spinoza, Meister Eckhart, and G. W. F. Hegel during her time at Japan Women's University. In 1908 she attempted a double-suicide with Morita Sōhei, her teacher – a married writer – and a disciple of novelist Natsume Soseki, in the mountains of Nasushiobara, Tochigi. The pair were found alive on the mountain, but the attempted suicide by such a highly educated pair aroused widespread public criticism.

Upon graduation from university, Hiratsuka entered the Narumi Women's English School where, in 1911, she founded Japan's first all-women literary magazine, Seitō (青鞜, literally Bluestocking). She began the first issue with the words, "In the beginning, woman was the sun" (「元始、女性は太陽であった」) – a reference to the Shinto sun goddess Amaterasu, legendary ancestress of the Imperial House of Japan, and to the spiritual independence which women had lost. Adopting the pen name Raichō ("Thunderbird"), she began to call for a women's spiritual revolution, and within its first few years the journal's focus shifted from literature to women's issues, including candid discussion of female sexuality, chastity and abortion. Contributors included renowned poet and women's rights proponent Yosano Akiko, among others.

Even though many Japanese became exposed to the ideas of the modern feminists, due to rebuttals by Japan's media, most did not take their ideas seriously, thinking that Raichō and her comrades were attempting to steal a moment of fame in history. Exaggerated stories of their love affairs and nonconformism, once again spread by Japan's mainstream press, turned public opinion against the magazine and prompted Raichō to publish several fierce defenses of her ideals. Her April 1913 essay "To the Women of the World" (「世の婦人たちに」) rejected the conventional role of women as ryōsai kenbo (良妻賢母, Good wife and wise mother): "I wonder how many women have, for the sake of financial security in their lives, entered into loveless marriages to become one man's lifelong servant and prostitute." This nonconformism pitted Seitō not only against the society but the state, contributing to the censorship of women's magazines that "disturbed public order" or introduced "Western ideas about women" deemed incompatible with Japan.

The journal folded in 1915, but not before establishing its founder as a leading light in Japan's women's movement. Meanwhile, in 1914, Hiratsuka began living openly with her younger lover, artist Okumura Hiroshi, with whom she had two children out of wedlock and eventually married in 1941.

From 1918 to 1919, Yosano Akiko started to claim the importance of women's financial independence in the context of the rapid development of capitalism in Japan after the end of World War I. Since Hiratsuka were influenced by Key's argument for the priority of motherhood through her translated works, she claimed that complete independence was an impractical expectation in the situation at that time, and added that maternity protection with financial assistance by the government would be necessary to establish women's national, social existence in the context of the difficult condition of women's workers, against Yosano's argument. Afterwards, Yamakawa Kikue and Yamada Waka participated in this debate, and it became a big social movement known as the Maternity Protection Controversy (母性保護論争, Bosei-hogo ronso).

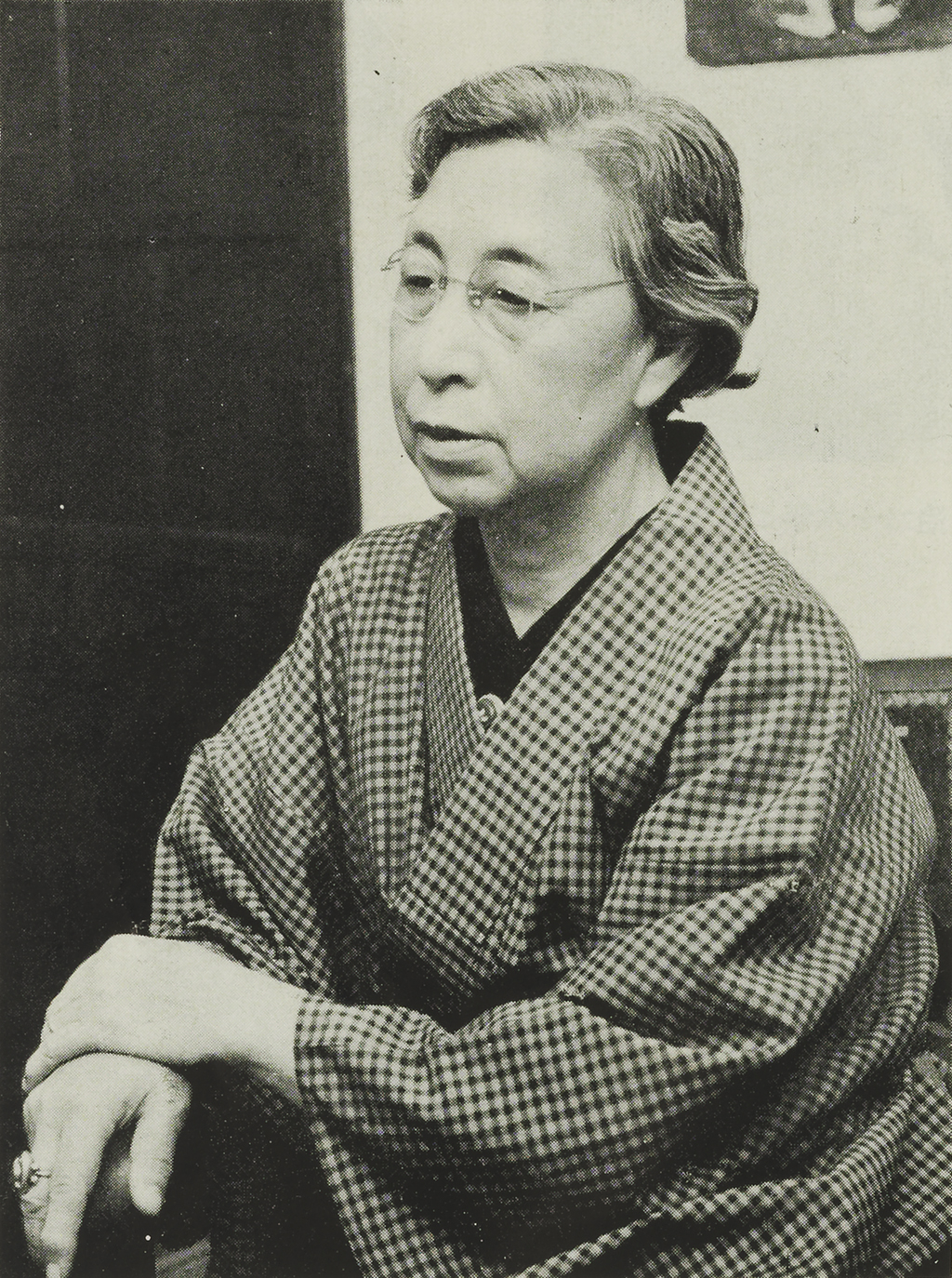
Raichō in 1955

In 1920, following an investigation into female workers' conditions in textile factories in Nagoya which further galvanized her political resolve, Hiratsuka founded the New Women's Association (新婦人協会, Shin-fujin kyokai) together with fellow women's rights activist Ichikawa Fusae. It was largely through this group's efforts that Article 5 of the Police Security Regulations—which, enacted in 1900, had barred women from joining political organizations and holding or attending political meetings—was overturned in 1922. Women's suffrage, however, remained elusive in Japan. A further and more controversial campaign attempted to ban men with venereal disease from marrying. This unsuccessful campaign remains a point of controversy surrounding Hiratsuka's career in that it saw her aligning herself with the eugenics movement, asserting that the spread of venereal diseases was having a detrimental effect on the Japanese "race".

Hiratsuka would join the cooperative movement in the 1930s, concluding that this would be the best option to include the most number of people towards the main goal of social reform. The next several years, however, saw Hiratsuka withdraw somewhat from the public eye, saddled with debts and her lover beset with health problems, although she would continue to write and lecture. In the postwar years, she emerged again as a public figure through the peace movement. In 1950, the day after the outbreak of the Korean War, she traveled to the United States together with writer and activist Nogami Yaeko and three other members of the Japan Women's Movement (婦人運動家) in order to present US Secretary of State Dean Acheson with a request that a system be created in which Japan could remain neutral and pacifist. Hiratsuka continued to champion women's rights in the postwar era, founding the New Japan Women's Association (新日本婦人の会) in 1963 together with Nogami and noted artist Iwasaki Chihiro, and continuing to write and lecture up until her death in 1971.

== Legacy ==
While her career as a political activist covered many decades, Hiratsuka is primarily remembered for her stewardship of the Seitō group. As a leading light of the women's movement in early twentieth century Japan, she was a highly influential figure whose devotees ranged from pioneering Korean feminist author Na Hye-sok (나혜석; 羅蕙錫) who was a student in Tokyo during Seitō's heyday, to anarchist and social critic Itō Noe whose membership in the Seitō organization generated some controversy. Her postwar organization, the New Japan Women's Association, remains active to this day.

On February 10, 2014, Google celebrated Raicho Hiratsuka's 128th birthday with a doodle.

== Selected works ==
=== Original works ===
- 『円窓より』 (Marumado yori, The View from the Round Window)
- 『元始、女性は太陽であった』 (Genshi, josei wa taiyō de atta, In The Beginning Woman Was The Sun)
- 『私の歩いた道』 (Watakushi no aruita michi, The Road I Walked)

=== Translations ===
- Ellen Karolina Sofia Key, The Renaissance of Motherhood (『母性の復興』, Bosei no fukkō)
- Key, Love and Marriage (『愛と結婚』, Ai to kekkon)
- Teruko Craig, In the Beginning, Woman Was the Sun – The Autobiography of a Japanese Feminist(『元始、女性は太陽であった』, Genshi, josei wa taiyō de atta)

== See also ==
- Bluestocking journal (Seitō)
- Blue Stockings Society (Seitō-sha)
- Feminism
- List of peace activists
- Fusae Ichikawa
- Ellen Key
- Akiko Yosano
- Timeline of women's suffrage
- Timeline of women's rights (other than voting)
- Women's suffrage in Japan

== Bibliography ==
- Catilo, Cheska (2021). "Hiratsuka Raicho: Leading Japanese Women to Higher Education and Liberation". Footnotes. 14: 83–90. ISSN 2816-3753.
- Craig, Teruko, ed. (2006) [1992]. In the Beginning, Woman was the Sun: The Autobiography of a Japanese Feminist. Columbia University Press. ISBN 978-0-231-13813-0.
- Kana, Mizutani (2023). "The Thought of Hiratsuka Raichō: Considering a Kinship of Buddhahood and Motherhood". Studies in East Asian Buddhism. 11. Translated by Williams, Joseph C.: 267–305. doi:10.34428/00013960. ISSN 2187-6983.
- Kimura, Saeko (2019). "Hiratsuka Raichō: Feminism and Androgynous Sexuality". In Kopf, Geroen (ed.). The Dao Companion to Japanese Buddhist Philosophy. Dao Companions to Chinese Philosophy. Vol. 8. Springer. pp. 617–633. doi:10.1007/978-90-481-2924-9_27. ISBN 978-90-481-2923-2.
- Tomida, Hiroko. "Hiratsuka Raichō, the Seitō Society, and the Emergence of the New Woman in Japan". In Tomida, Hiroko; Daniels, Gordon (eds.). Japanese Women: Emerging from Subservience, 1868–1945. Women in Japanese History. Vol. 1. pp. 192–221. doi:10.1163/9789004213838_006. ISBN 9789004213838.
- Tomida, Hiroko (2004). Hiratsuka Raichō and Early Japanese Feminism. Brill's Japanese Studies Library. Vol. 19. Brill. ISBN 978-90-47-41262-5.
- Yoneda, Sayoko (2005). "Hiratsuka Raichō's Idea of Society: Nature, Cooperation and Self-Government". In Tomida, Hiroko; Daniels, Gordon (eds.). Japanese Women: Emerging from Subservience, 1868–1945. Women in Japanese History. Vol. 1. pp. 21–39. doi:10.1163/9789004213838_006. ISBN 9789004213838.
