= Yoshiko Yuasa =

Japanese translator of Russian (1896–1990)

Yuasa Yoshiko
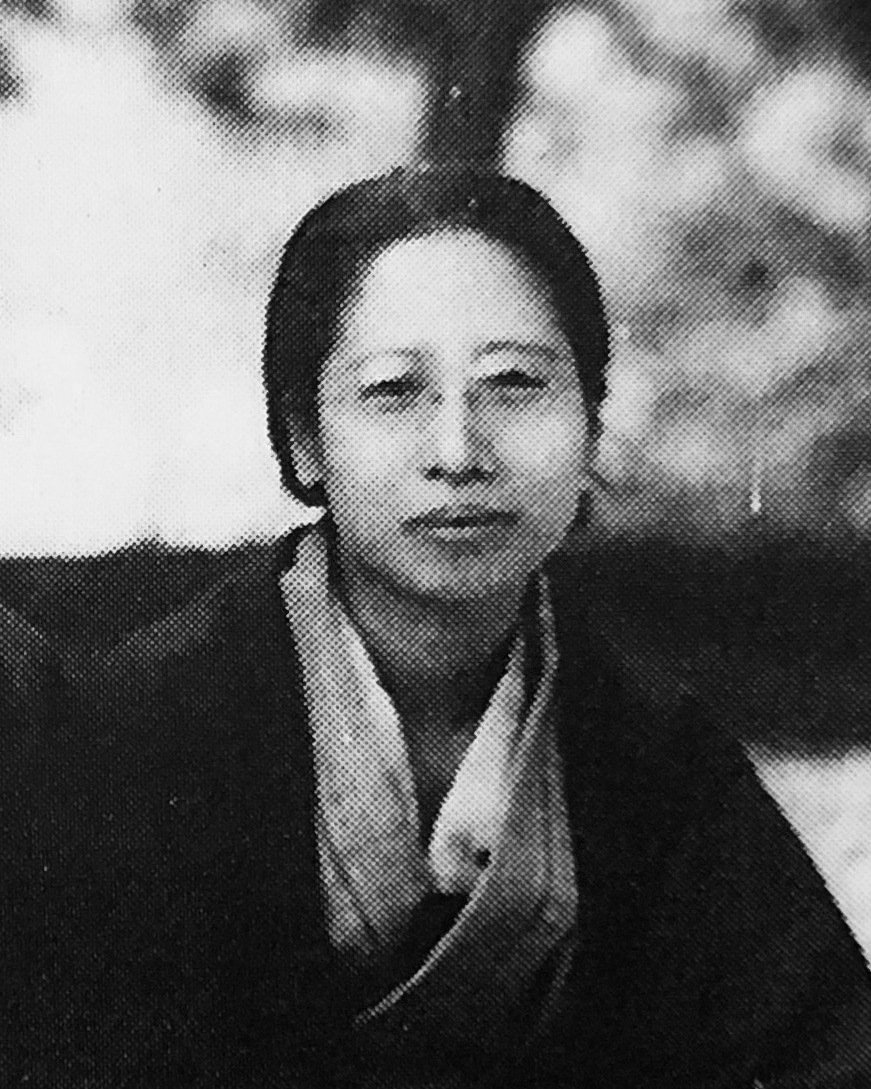
- Yuasa Yoshiko
- Born: 7 December 1896; Kyoto, Japan
- Died: October 24, 1990 (aged 93); Tokyo, Japan
- Occupation: Writer
- Writing career
- Genre: Russian literature translations

Yuasa Yoshiko (湯浅 芳子; December 7, 1896 – October 24, 1990) was a Russian language scholar and translator of Russian literature in Shōwa era Japan.

== Biography ==
Born in Kyoto, Yuasa was an early supporter of the feminist movement in late Taishō and early Shōwa period Japan. Moving to Tokyo, she was also drawn to leftist political movements and became involved with leading female proletarian literature movement novelist Chūjō Yuriko. In 1924, after Chūjō divorced her husband, the two women began to live together, and from 1927–1930, traveled together to the Soviet Union, where they studied the Russian language and Russian literature and developed a friendship with noted movie director Sergei Eisenstein.

Evidence suggests that the relationship between Yuasa and Chūjō was a romantic if not sexual one. While Yuasa has also been romantically linked to writer Tamura Toshiko among others, Chūjō is said to have been the love of Yuasa's life. Yuasa was never again romantically linked to another woman after Chūjō's marriage to proletarian author and Japan Communist Party leader Miyamoto Kenji, although in an interview late in life Yuasa said that the word "lesbian" (rezubian/レズビアン) applied to her.

After their return to Japan and Chūjō remarried, Yuasa continued with her translation work of Russian authors, especially the works of Maxim Gorky, Anton Chekhov and Samuil Marshak. She is especially known for her translation of Chekhov's The Cherry Orchard. Yuasa died in 1990, and her grave is at Tōkei-ji, a temple in Kamakura.

== Legacy ==
After her death, the Yuasa Yoshiko Prize was established for the best translation of a foreign language stage play into Japanese.

== Portrayals ==
Yuriko, Dasvidaniya is a 2011 drama film, depicting a brief period in 1924, in which Nahana plays Yuasa. Directed by Sachi Hamano, the film is based on two of Yuriko's autobiographical novels, Nobuko and Futatsu no niwa, and on Hitomi Sawabe's non-fiction novel Yuriko, dasuvidaniya: Yuasa Yoshiko no seishun.

== See also ==
- Japanese literature
- List of Japanese authors
