= New Women's Association =

Japanese women's rights organization (1919–1922)

The New Women's Association (NWA, also known as New Women's Society 新婦人協会, Shin-fujin kyōkai) was a Japanese women's rights organization founded in 1919. The organization strove to enhance women's rights in the areas of education, employment, and suffrage. It also aimed to protect women from venereal disease by attempting to prevent men with these diseases from marrying, as well as by allowing women whose husbands had these diseases to get a divorce. The organization played an important role in changing Article 5 of the Public Peace Police Law, which had prohibited women from participating in public meetings. NWA also enlisted the help of men as advocates for women in politics. The New Women's Association was also the first group in Japan to involve Feminist ideology so intently in politics through lobbying and various political pursuits.

The organization is widely credited for raising the issue of women's rights in Japan and influencing the Diet's decision to expand them. The Diet passed changes to Article 5 of the Public Peace Police Law in 1922. The Organization had very diverse backgrounds including working class women and men from various different backgrounds. The organization disbanded in the same year under the authority of leader Hiratsuka Raichō.

== Purpose ==
The New Women's Association was formed in an effort to allow women both freedom and the right to vote. The establishment of NWA was affected by the domestic and global trend of innovation. Due to the Russian Revolution and WWI, Japan was in a middle of Taishō Democracy at that time, and labor movement and universal suffrage movement became active. In addition, women's suffrage was admitted in some western nations. These trends made Hiratsuka, who is the founder of the NWA, think about social remodeling.

The group's aims included raising the "social and political position of women in Japan." Furthermore, the organization strove to obtain gender equality in education and employment. The leaders, Hiratsuka Raichō, Ichikawa Fusae, and Oku Mumeo, also focused on repealing or modifying Article 5 of the Public Police Law. This law prohibited women from participating in political activity publicly. The organization drafted two petitions advocating women's political rights. The law was an obstacle for women's political movement. Ichikawa thought of the amendment as a first step to women's suffrage. Hiratsuka was not interested in political rights before, but she came to understand the importance of them because she recognized more of her identity as a woman. After experiencing childbirth and childcare, she began to think about advocating rights to live as a woman.

In addition to this, the organization aimed to stop men with venereal disease (Karyū-byō) getting married. Karyū-byō was the venereal disease which infects people in Karyū-kai(Geisha and prostitute society). The purpose for preventing men with the disease from marrying was not a legislation or petition campaign but also aimed to encourage women to aware of themselves as individual women by raising the issue of patriarchy which women cannot reject a partner decided by the patriarch and the double standard of sexual morality. Hiratsuka knew women in her personal circle who had been directly impacted men venereal disease, thus she created this goal. At the time, women were expected to be sexually pure, and prohibited from having sexual relations with men without their husbands by law. However, men were accepted to have sexual relations with women. Hiratsuka pointed out that there was the double standard that men forced women to be sexually pure while men themselves had sexual freedom. Hiratsuka and Ichikawa did not have a full understanding of politics and had to refer to men within the diet to assist them in achieveing their goals. Through this assistance they both lobbied for and drafted a petition in favor of this with the goal of protecting the women whose husbands had or would later contract a sexually transmitted disease. The petition that was drafted for this purpose would have also given a woman the right to divorce her husband if he had venereal disease or contracted one during their marriage. This petition gained more traction than the organization's attempts to obtain women's suffrage and rights, and even gained the support of the Japan Women's Christian Temperance Union.

== History ==
The New Women's Association was formed in post-World War I Japan. At this time, women's suffrage and equality movements were happening globally that inspired, but was not the sole reason this organization was created. During the Taishō period, there were many questions about the structure and power of the government. Democracy and Pluralism were concepts being heavily taken into account alongside universal suffrage. Over the years, however, men continued to hold power while women had no say over matters that could concern them. The Rice Riots of 1918 were a key time of political demonstrations. Some of which, were led by women. One of the urgent requests from the working class rioters was suffrage, however the outcome from these riots only extended suffrage to men of all classes. In light of the recent riots regarding suffrage, women began discussions of their own suffrage. This new organization formed under the leadership of figures such as Hiratsuka Raichō, who was one of the founders of Bluestocking. Hiratsuka Raichō asked Ichikawa Fusae to form a women's rights organization with Oku Mumeo starting in 1919. Oku had recently had a son, and she would carry him on her back to NWA meetings and use the pram to carry copies of the group's journal, Women's League (Josei dōmei).

The organization petitioned the Diet in order to bring about changes that would allow women to be politically involved, among other issues. On January 6, 1920, Hiratsuka, Ichikawa, and Oku gathered at Hiratsuka's residence. At this gathering, the three women and other activists drafted two petitions. One of the petitions was created to grant women citizenship and the ability to be politically active, while the other petition was created to protect women and require men to get tested for syphilis before getting married. The second petition also would have granted wives the ability to divorce their husbands and receive compensation in these cases.

NWA's first meeting was held on February 21, 1920, in Tokyo at the YMCA hall in Kanda. This first meeting had around 500 in attendance and 70% of the audience were male. The official charter of the group and membership rules were later announced on March 28, 1920. As of 1921, there were 412 members of the organization.

In 1920, Ichikawa Fusae left the New Women's Association. She was in the United States for two-and-a-half years, though her departure from the New Women's Association came largely as a result of Ichikawa and Hiratsuka's differing opinions. Ichikawa was a doer rather than a thinker. She aimed to first announce the purpose and plans of the movement and launch a campaign while Hiratsuka thought about publishing a magazine and recruiting supporters. The reasons for Ichikawa's leaving the New Women's Association was that the work of the association was a strain for her. Moreso, financial strain for the association added to the discourse between Ichikawa and Hiratsuka's differing opinion. While Hiratsuka and Oku were busy with childcare and household, Ichikawa had to do a lot of workload, and it made her grumpy. She resigned as the leader of the association in June 1921 and left for the US in July in the same year.

Changes to Article 5 were passed in 1922, approved by both houses of the Diet. After that, the organization disbanded in the same year. There are several reasons for disbandment. One of the causes is Hiratsuka's sickness. The office of the New Women's Association was placed in her house, and she couldn't separate her daily life and work. She suffered from headache, vomiting, and diarrhea because of overwork and stress. She left Tokyo with her family, but her position was retained. The other reason is the difference in purpose between Hiratsuka and other members. She regarded the association as a step to change the double standard of sexual morality, but others focused on the changes of the Article 5 of the Public Peace Police Law. The loss of Ichikawa and Hiratsuka damaged the association. After she left from Tokyo, Oku continued her position but resigned in 1922 as a result of conflict between her and Makoto Sakamoto, the one who contributed to the change of the Article 5 with Oku. Hiratsuka declared the disbandment of the New Women's Association in the statement in December, 1922.

== The amendment of Article 5 of the Public Police Law ==
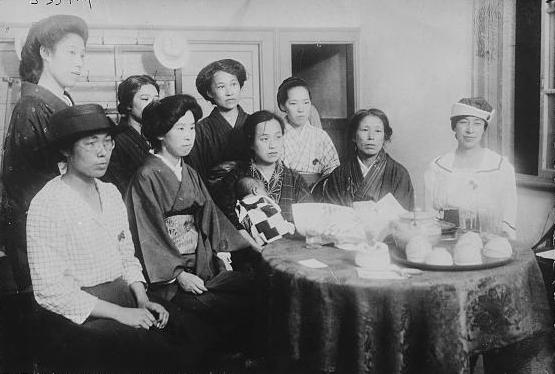
A speech organized by the New Women's Association calling for a revision of Article 5 of the Public Police Law, July 18, 1920

The organization petitioned the Diet about changes of Article 5 of the Public Police Law and regulated men with venereal diseases getting married. Lobbying for the amendment of Article 5 has happened before, but it didn't succeed. Hiratsuka thought that suffrage was necessary for women to amend the law which is disadvantageous for them.

According to paragraphs 1 and 2 in Article 5, it is written that "women" are prohibited from joining any political organizations or participate in political meetings. The petition about Article 5 proposed that the words "women" in paragraphs 1 and 2 be deleted. The two petitions were submitted to the House of Representatives and Japanese House of Peers.

On February 23, the petitions were discussed in the Diet, but it was not adopted as premature to change the law. Although the organization tried to submit the draft amendment of the law after the discussion, they couldn't because the Imperial Diet was suddenly dissolved on February 26. In June 1920, the second petitions were submitted to the 43rd special Diet. The petition about Article 5 was adopted in the House of Representatives, but the deliberation did not finish until the end of the session.

On October 28, 1920, the petitions included Article 5, marriage regulation, and voting rights for women were submitted. Whereas the latter two were not adopted, the petition about paragraph 2 in Article 5 which regulates participating for women to political meetings was adopted through the Association of Friends of Constitutional Government (Seiyū-Kai) which is the ruling party at the time and passed in the House of Representatives. However, it was rejected because of baron Fujimura's opposition. He described that women's participation in political campaigns is against the family system which is based on the society at this time. His claim expressed the opinions which men at that time had about women.

Afterwards, because Ichikawa left the New Women's Association and Hiratsuka also left Tokyo, Oku who is one of the leaders of the association and Makoto Sakamoto led the association and continued to petition.

In 1921, 3 petitions were submitted again and the petition about paragraph 2 in Article 5 was adopted in both the House of Representatives and Japanese House of Peers. The legal amendment was enforced on May 5, 1922.

== Newspaper reports on the NWA ==
The New Women's Association was somewhat legitimized by the Media. The NWA received a lot of positive media coverage on top of public attention and criticism. There were fewer smears in the newspapers than in Seitō, and they instead covered their activities positively. The NWA told their plan and used them as a way of advertising and holding lectures. The first women's convention which the NWA declared establishment was hosted by the Osaka Asahi Shimbun company. The Kokumin Shinbun also held the lecture of Hiratsuka and Waka Yamada, and Hiratsuka talked about the NWA movement. Newspapers also covered the petition movement. They reported the entire process from the discussion of the petitions to the final amendment. Mainly the Yomiuri Shimbun, the Touchō Shinbun (Tokyō Asahi Shinbun), and the Kokumin Shinbun mentioned about the discussion of the petition. Newspapers also covered their passion for the activities and the comment by members being happy with the passage of amendment. Newspapers were the main mass-media at that time, and they led the public by following the trend of Democracy.

The NWA on the other hand distributed to newspaper companies the progress report about the first discussion in the Diet. This is considered that the NWA effectively used newspapers as the place of report. Newspapers mainly focused on two petitions at first, but they became concentrated on the amendment of Article 5 and barely reported marriage regulation for men with venereal diseases at the end of the movement. It is thought that because the NWA focused more on Article 5 at that time.

== Public recognition ==
NWA attracted the attention of prominent people, both men and women. Hiratsuka and Ichikawa used their connections through family and careers to give leverage to the New Women's Association. While some praised the association, others questioned the purpose of NWA and criticized its limited class. Firstly, Yosano Akiko wrote two commentaries on NWA. According to Fujin Kōron, she described the establishment of the NWA as a "recent significant phenomena among women", and she showed her favoritism toward it. In contrast, the second commentary questioned focusing on the amendment of Article 5 nevertheless the general election movement became active. Furthermore, she said that she "couldn't help but have a sense of the strangeness" of the marriage regulation for men with Karyū-byō. She pointed out the unfairness of only targeting men with venereal disease and restrictions in love marriages. Despite some differences of opinions, she appreciated the association.Morito Tatsuo also valued the NWA. He characterized the activities of the NWA as liberating women from their subordinate position in the male culture and changing the male-dominated culture and creating a humanistic culture. He understood Hiratsuka's purpose of radically changing the status of women, and he gave some advice for their activities.

On the other hand, sociologist feminist and women workers distasted for the NWA. Yamakawa Kikue and Itō Noe, were members of the Red Wave Society, criticized the NWA severely. Yamakawa criticized the NWA as the position of socialist. She accused Hiratsuka of changing the NWA into the association of bourgeois women and excluded working class women. She described the NWA as " Hiratuska's the outdated aristocratic, self-righteous hedonism" and expressed their activities as "Bourgeois Games". She also sneered at the petition movement. Ito also criticized the NWA from the perspective of an anarchist. She said in Kaizō that "I am not afraid to assert that the New Women's Association movement is a completely selfish movement of middle-class women."

As a matter of fact, the NWA has various members including working class women, men, and women who joined other women's organizations such as Seitō and Japan Christian Women's Organization, but the number of members in the working class is a few. In addition, the activities for marriage regulation for men with venereal diseases have been from a middle-class perspective. Hiratsuka tried to protect middle and upper-middle class women from Karyū-byō, so she did not take into account women such as prostitutes and tended to focus only to the class of women which she belonged to. Even so, these criticisms included those against Hiratsuka personally and there were many critics who didn't understand the actual purpose of the NWA.

== Notable members ==
- Hiratsuka Raichō
- Ichikawa Fusae
- Oku Mumeo

== See also ==
- Feminism in Japan
- Bluestocking
