= The New Japanese Woman =

2003 non-fiction book by Barbara Sato

The New Japanese Woman: Modernity, Media, and Women in Interwar Japan
- Author: Barbara Sato
- Language: English
- Publisher: Duke University Press
- Publication date: 2003
- ISBN: 978-0-8223-8476-2

The New Japanese Woman: Modernity, Media, and Women in Interwar Japan is a non-fiction book by Barbara Sato about women and gender roles in 1920s and 1930s Japan. It was published in 2003 by Duke University Press.
