= Takamure Itsue =

Japanese poet and activist (1894–1964)

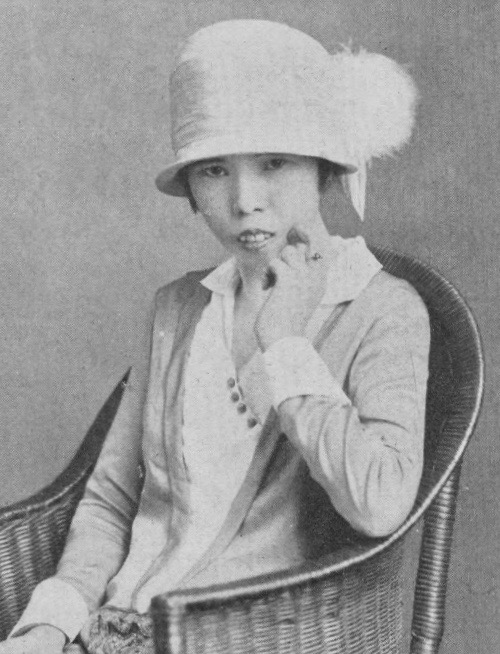
- Born: January 18, 1894; Kumamoto, Japan
- Died: June 7, 1964 (aged 70); Tokyo, Japan
- Known for: 日本古代婚姻例集 Nippon kodai kon'in reishū
- Spouse: Hashimoto Kenzō

Takamure Itsue (高群 逸枝; January 18, 1894 – June 7, 1964) was a Japanese poet, activist-writer, feminist, anarchist, ethnologist and historian.

== Biography ==
Takamure was born into a poor family in rural Kumamoto Prefecture in 1894. Her father was a schoolteacher, and educated his daughter in classical Chinese, among other subjects not standard in Japanese women's education at the time. Despite higher academic ambitions, after failing to complete her post-secondary education and working for a time in a cotton-spinning mill, she returned home in 1914 and taught in the same school as her father for three years. In 1917 she met her future partner and editor Hashimoto Kenzō, with whom she lived sporadically after 1919 and who became her legal husband in 1922. Before moving to Tokyo in 1920, she worked briefly for a newspaper in Kumamoto City and undertook the Shikoku pilgrimage in 1918. Takamure's articles on her experiences and the fact that she undertook the pilgrimage as an unmarried woman alone made her something of a celebrity in Japan at the time, and her notoriety only grew after she left her household and husband in Tokyo in the company of another man in 1925. A public scandal ensued despite her speedy reconciliation with Hashimoto, to which Takamure angrily responded in the poem Ie de no shi ("Poem on leaving home"), which was published in her book Tokyo wa netsubyō ni kakatteiru at the end of the year.

In 1926 Takamure met and became friends with the pioneering Japanese feminist Hiratsuka Raichō, herself the famous editor of the defunct feminist journal Bluestocking, and published the first systematic elucidation of her views in Ren'ai sōsei. Her status as her household's primary wage-earner led her to publish a great many articles in various journals and magazines during these years, as well as to engage with other prominent Japanese feminists in print. The most prominent of these exchanges was a debate on marriage and motherhood with Yamakawa Kikue through 1928 into 1929, mostly in the pages of the women's journal Fujin Kōron. Against Yamakawa's standard Marxist critique of marriage as a bourgeois institution of economic oppression, Takamure articulated an anarchist, community-oriented vision of a post-revolutionary future that would preserve the role of mothers in childcare and place the concerns of women and mothers at the center rather than the periphery of society.

Takamure's deepening commitment to anarchism led her to join the anarchist-feminist group Proletarian Women Artists' League (Musan Fujin Geijitsu Renmei) and, in 1930, to found the anarchist feminist journal Fujin Sensen (The Woman's Front). Fujin Sensen lasted for sixteen issues, until it was shut down in June 1931, as part of deepening fascist repression by the government. In response to these developments and to an affair on Takamure's part, Takamure and Hashimoto withdrew to suburban Tokyo in July 1931. From her "House in the Woods" (Mori no ie), named in homage to Henry David Thoreau's Walden, Takamure embarked on the most influential phase of her career, that of a pioneering historian in the field of Japanese women's history.

Despite her anarcha-feminist beliefs, during World War II, Takamure wrote a number of polemical articles in support of Japanese imperialism in Asia, although she also penned criticisms of the sexual violence committed by the Imperial Japanese Army. She also began to research and publish on women's roles and matrilineage in ancient Japanese society, ancient marriage institutions, and the right of women to own and inherit property in earlier times. Only one of these books, Bokeisei no kenkyû (1938), appeared before the end of the war, but it was followed in the postwar period by Shōseikon no kenkyû (1953) and Josei no rekishi (1954).

Takamure's death in 1964 largely predated the uptake of her scholarship into the academy as well as the rediscovery and criticism of her prewar and wartime writings by feminist scholars beginning in the 1970s. Her scholarship and method were heavily influenced by the nativism of Motoori Norinaga, which led her to conclude, against the folkloristic (minzokugaku) conclusions of Yanagita Kunio, that marriage in the Heian period had been largely uxorilocal: that is, where the married couple lives with the wife’s family. Takamure's work was later endorsed by William McCullough, in his classic article on Heian marriage in 1967, and has become the standard position in the field.

== Selected works ==
- 東京は熱病にかゝつてゐる (Tōkyō wa netsubyō ni kakatteiru, "Tokyo is Feverish")
- 恋愛創生 (Ren'ai sōsei, "Genesis of Love")
- 母系制の研究：大日本女性史１ (Bokeisei no kenkyū: Dainihon joseishi 1, "Study of Matrilineal Systems: Women's History of Great Japan, 1")
- 招婿婚の研究 (Shōseikon no kenkyū, "Studies in Uxorilocal Marriage")
- 女性の歴史 (Josei no rekishi, "A History of Women")
- 娘巡礼記 (Musume junreiki, "An Unmarried Woman's Pilgrimage")
- 日本古代婚姻例集 (Nippon kodai kon'in reishū, "A Collection of Examples of Japanese Marriage from Ancient Times")

== See also ==
- Hiratsuka Raichō
- Bluestocking
- Yamakawa Kikue

== Bibliography ==
- Ryang, Sonia (1998). "Love and Colonialism in Takamure Itsue's Feminism: A Postcolonial Critique". Feminist Review. 60 (60): 1–32. doi:10.1080/014177898339370. ISSN 0141-7789. JSTOR 1395545. S2CID 145270502.
- Tsurumi, E. Patricia (June 1985). "Feminism and anarchism in Japan: Takamure Itsue, 1894–1964". Bulletin of Concerned Asian Scholars. 17 (2): 2–19. doi:10.1080/14672715.1985.10409762. ISSN 0007-4810.
