= Yamakawa Kikue =

Japanese feminist

- 山川菊栄
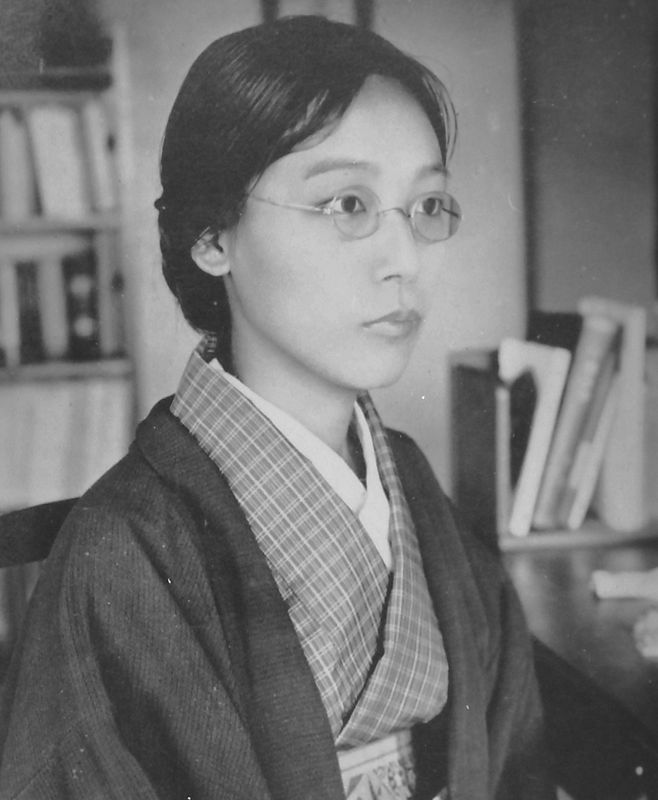
- Yamakawa in 1920
- Born: Morita Kikue; November 3, 1890; Kōji, Tokyo, Japan
- Died: November 2, 1980 (aged 89); Tokyo, Japan
- Spouse: Yamakawa Hitoshi (m. 1916)
- Writing career
- Notable work: Women of the Mito Domain: Recollections of Samurai Family Life

Yamakawa Kikue (山川菊栄; November 3, 1890 – November 2, 1980) was a Japanese essayist, activist, and socialist feminist who contributed to the development of feminism in modern Japan.

Born into a highly-educated family of the former samurai class, Yamakawa graduated from the private women's college Joshi Eigaku Juku (renamed Tsuda College in 1948) in 1912. In 1916, she married the communist activist and theoretician Yamakawa Hitoshi, who, in 1922, founded the short-lived pre-war Japanese Communist Party and was a leader of the Labor-Farmer faction.

In pre-war times, Yamakawa contributed to the development of feminism as a founding member of the Red Wave Society (Sekirankai), Japan's first socialist women's organization, and she was one of the most visible socialist women. She is famous for "her position in debates on prostitution and motherhood, in which she consistently challenged liberal feminists (who she termed 'bourgeois feminists') on the possibility of women achieving full rights within a capitalist system". While Yamakawa is perhaps better known for these debates, "her participation in male-dominant socialist organizations and her interventionist writings on behalf of women within those organizations, directed toward her male socialist peers, were equally substantial".

After the end of World War II, Yamakawa became the first head of the Women's and Minors' Bureau of the Ministry of Labor from 1947 to 1951. In addition, she engaged in activism for women's and workers' rights.

== Early life ==
Yamakawa was born Morita Kikue on November 3, 1890, in Kōjimachi, Tokyo. Her father, Morita Ryūnosuke, came from a family of samurai of the lowest rank in the Matsue Domain (present Matsue City, Shimane Prefecture) and worked his way through language school in Yokohama City in Kanagawa Prefecture. Having mastered French, he became an interpreter in the army, and later he managed a meat business. Her mother, Morita Chise, was the daughter of Aoyama Enju, who was a Confucian scholar in the Mito Domain. Chise had a passion for learning and graduated from Tokyo Women's Higher Normal School (present Ochanomizu University) as a first-generation student of the school. Yamakawa Kikue's siblings were accomplished in languages: her older sister Matsue was a pioneer of female Esperantists, and her older brother Toshio was a scholar of German literature in Japan. She also had a younger sister named Shizue.

In 1908, Yamakawa attended the private women's college Joshi Eigaku Juku (present Tsuda University) in Tokyo. According to one of her teachers, she almost failed college because when she took the entrance exam, she wrote a resolution that she would work for the liberation of women. In her first year of study, Kikue visited a spinning mill factory with her Christian acquaintances and was shocked to see female workers working in terrible working conditions. When she heard Christian lecturers praise the work there, she was outraged at the notion that people should appreciate their work in spite of the terrible conditions in which the work was done. This experience made her realize that religion could not solve the manifold problems faced by women factory workers. This experience fueled her future course of action and awakened her to socialism and social science. After her graduation in 1912, Yamakawa worked in a publishing company part-time, engaging in making an English dictionary and translation.

== As a feminist thinker and critic ==
=== Controversy over the abolition of prostitution (1915–1916) ===
From 1915 through 1916, Yamakawa made her debut as Aoyama Kikue in the world of criticism within the larger debate on the abolition of prostitution with the Japanese feminist Itō Noe in Seitō, the first female literary magazine in Japan. Itō Noe criticized the Christian women's organization's movement to abolish prostitution licensed by the government because the organization's movement was "hypocritical" in that the organization tried to abolish public prostitution from the viewpoints of valuing "virginity" and "chastity". She blamed the way the Christian movement looked down the sex industry and tried to solve the issue just by taking the jobs away from sex workers. Itō also said, "the sex industry is acknowledged by the public because, as everyone says, the industry has been strengthened by men's natural demands and a long history of the industry." Unlike Itō who disagreed with the movements, Kikue, to some extent, agreed with the Christian movement's aim of abolishing public prostitution. However, on the one hand, Kikue agreed with Itō's argument about the movement of Christian women's organizations in that the movement divided women into two categories: "clean" and "unclean" women. On the other hand, Kikue argued against Itō that the long history of prostitution could not justify the existence of the industry, and that licensed prostitution was not a system created by men's natural demands but one that arose because the social system internalized an unnatural power balance between men and women. Moreover, Kikue said that she would disagree with a system in which women suffer even if the system seemed necessary for men's "instinctive" desires. Kikue also mentioned private prostitution and contended that the system of prostitution was based on the disparity between rich and poor produced by the private ownership system and the domination of women by men. Furthermore, she pointed out the double standard of female sexuality in a male-dominant and patriarchal society. In sum, Kikue did not think the Christian movement, which encouraged women to follow sexual norms mainly created by men's selfish desires, would lead to the abolishment of licensed prostitution. Rather, she thought it would be realized by abolishing capitalism and men's dominance over women.

=== Controversy over maternity protection (1918–1919) ===
From 1918 to 1919, the two magazines Fujin Kōron (Women's forum) and Taiyō (The Sun) hosted a controversial debate over maternity protection. In addition to Kikue, who changed her family name to Yamakawa after her marriage, famous Japanese feminists such as Yosano Akiko, Hiratsuka Raichō, and Yamada Waka took part in the debate. Broadly, the debates had two standpoints. On one side, Yosano argued that the liberation of women required the economic independence of women. On the other side, Hiratsuka argued that it was impossible or difficult to do both work and parenting. Hiratsuka also viewed women's childbirth and parenting as a national and social project, and thus argued that women deserved the protection of motherhood by the government. They had different opinions about whether women could do both work and family life, and their arguments did not overlap at all. In order to organize these arguments, Yamakawa Kikue named Yosano the "Japanese Mary Wollstonecraft" and Hiratsuka the "Japanese Ellen Key". Yamakawa wrote, "Yosano emphasizes women's individualism. She started by demanding freedom of education, an expansion of the selection of work, and financial independence and eventually demanded suffrage". Yamakawa partly agreed with Yosano but criticized her opinion for thinking only about bourgeois women. Moreover, Yamakawa disagreed with Yosano that the protection of motherhood by the nation was a shame because it was the same as the government's care of the elderly and the disabled. In this respect, Yamakawa said that Yosano's view was biased on a class society because Yosano only criticized old and disabled people depending on the public assistance while she did not mention soldiers and public servants who also depended on assistance in the same way. Yamakawa argued that Hiratsuka's position was more advanced than that of Yosano in that it took a more critical attitude towards capitalism. However, Yamakawa criticized Hiratsuka for too much emphasis on motherhood. Yamakawa said that Hiratsuka viewed women's ultimate goal as childbirth and parenting, and that it led women to obey male-centered society's idea that women should sacrifice their work in compensation for completing the ultimate goal. Yamakawa summarized these arguments and argued that financial independence and protection of motherhood were compatible and natural demands of women. As a socialist feminist, Yamakawa argued that female workers should play an active role in winning both economic equality and the protection of motherhood, and that the liberation of women required the reform of capitalist society which exploited workers. Moreover, Yamakawa Kikue made an objection to present society which left household labor as unpaid work. Furthermore, Yamakawa was distinct from Yosano and Hiratsuka in that she saw welfare for the elderly as a right.

=== Multiple viewpoints against discrimination ===
Yamakawa, as a socialist feminist, had multiple viewpoints against discrimination (sexism, racism, and classism) and took a position against colonialism and imperialism. In 1925, the Universal Manhood Suffrage Law (普通選挙法, Futsū Senkyo Hō) abolished the restriction of voting rights based on tax payment and granted the right to all men over age 25. However, women were not allowed to participate in politics. Later, the movement headed by members of the New Women's Association (新婦人協会, Shin Fujin Kyokai), persuaded the government to change Article 5 of the Public Police Law, which had banned women from joining political assemblies. As a result, women were given the right to participate in political assemblies, but they were still not allowed to vote.

In response to the passage of the Universal Manhood Suffrage Law, a political study group was organized for re-establishing the Japanese Communist Party. A few women, including Yamakawa Kikue, participated in the study group. However, the policy directions the men-dominant study group did not sufficiently address women's issues. Therefore, Yamakawa submitted the following eight-point demand for equal gender rights:

1. Abolish the patriarchal household system.
2. Abolish all laws that view a woman as an incompetent person, regardless of marital status. Give equal rights between men and women regarding marriage and divorce.
3. Equal rights of educational institutions and work for women and the residents in colonies to Japanese men.
4. Guarantee an equal minimum wage, regardless of sex or ethnicity.
5. Equal pay for equal work among men, women, and the residents in colonies.
6. Provide female working mothers with a room and one thirty-minute recess every three hours for feeding.
7. Ban the firing of women on account of marriage, pregnancy, or childbirth status.
8. Abolish licensed prostitution.

In the first and two points, Yamakawa had much common with her women's suffrage colleagues. Yamakawa shared much with the leadership of the Women's Suffrage League in that both "argued throughout the prewar period that Japan's legally codified family system, which designated a usually male head-of-household and excluded other family members (including wives) from owning property, denied women legal decision-making capacity". In points three, four, and five, Yamakawa was substantially different from her Suffrage League colleagues who did not take issues of equality and inclusion for Japan's colonized peoples into consideration of suffrage or other rights for Japanese women. Her final three demands came from the core of her concern for women's rights as workers' rights. Here, Yamakawa represented working-class women by pointing to the most basic issues for them.

Communist male leaders disagreed with the first and second proposals for the reason that they had already acknowledged that women were equal to men. On the other hand, Yamakawa argued that it was not a problem of their perception but a social problem, namely, whether society would accept a law that approved of gender inequality. Communist male boards also disagreed with the third proposal, in which Yamakawa questioned why they approved of educational restrictions for residents in colonies, which was obviously part of imperialistic policies, whereas they, as Communists, disagreed with imperialistic policies. The Communist leaders disagreed with equal rights to work for women and residents in colonies to Japanese men, arguing that their cheap labor had already taken jobs away from Japanese men. On the other hand, Yamakawa said that capitalists' hiring of women, Chinese, and Koreans because of their cheap labor had already taken jobs away from Japanese men, and that equal pay for equal work in addition to equal rights in education and work would solve the problems that concerned the leaders. Moreover, Yamakawa argued that women and residents in colonies demanded equal pay and open occupational opportunities as equals to Japanese men, and that they demanded not Japanese male workers but the bourgeoisie to approve the proposal. Although her proposals were not always adopted, by emphasizing women's issues within male-dominant socialist organizations, Yamakawa ″shifted socialist discourse in significant ways that forced a consideration of women and their relation to class".

== During wartime: criticism of colonialism and imperialist feminism ==
In 1923, the Great Kanto Earthquake, hit the Kantō area, including Tokyo. After the earthquake, the rumor that Koreans had poisoned a well was spread. Many Koreans, Chinese, and Taiwanese people were killed by the military police and vigilantes who believed the rumor. Not only did Yamakawa criticize the military police and vigilantes for these actions, but she also denounced the Japanese who internalized anti-foreignism as a result of imperial and colonial education. During the war, famous Japanese feminists and suffragists appeared to abandon their oppositional stance and embrace nationalism, aiming at getting women's rights and improving women's status. However, "Yamakawa was one of the few prewar women's rights activists who did not support state actions or the state mobilization of women". She continued to criticize the government, but the onset of the Pacific War made it impossible for her to openly criticize the government.

== The head of the Women's and Minors' Bureau (1947–1951) ==
After the Second World War, Yamakawa and her husband Hitoshi Yamakawa both joined the Japan Socialist Party. When the cabinet of Katayama Tetsu newly organized the Ministry of Labor and established the Women's and Minors' Bureau under the Ministry, Yamakawa was asked to be the first head of the Bureau. She served from 1947 to 1951. After this service, she engaged in research on the liberation of women and women's issues with younger researchers, in addition to publishing and organizing committees for women's issues. She died of a stroke in 1980 at the age of 90. After she died, women cherishing her established the Yamakawa Kikue Memorial Organization, which still exists today.

== List of works ==
- From the Standpoint of Women (女の立場から) 1919
- The Modern Life of Women (現代の生活と婦人) 1919
- Women's Rebellion (女性の反逆) 1922
- May Day (メーデー) 1923
- Women's Issues and Movements (婦人問題と婦人運動) 1925
- Liebknechit and Luxembourg (リープクネヒトとルクセンブルク) 1925
- Proletarian Feminist Movements (無産階級の婦人運動) 1928
- Women's Fifty Lessons (女性五十講) 1933
- Women and Social Conditions: Collection of Commentaries (婦人と世相 評論集) 1937
- Women Are Working (女は働いてゐる) 1940
- Autumn and Pigs in a Village (村の秋と豚 随筆集) 1943
- The Village I Live In (わが住む村) 1943
- Women of a Samurai Family（武家の女性）1943
  - Yamakawa, Kikue (1992). Women of the Mito domain : recollections of samurai family life. Translated by Kate Wildman Nakai. Tokyo: University of Tokyo Press. ISBN 4-13-027028-1. OCLC 25960900.
- For the Women of Tomorrow（明日の女性のために）1947
- Japanese Democratization and Women（日本の民主化と女性）1947
- Comments on the Liberation of Women (婦人解放論) 1947
- New Principle of Wage, Beatrice Webb, Research of Gender Pay Equality Systems（新しい賃金原則 ピアトリス・ウエップ 男女平等賃銀制の研究）1948
- For the New Women（新しき女性のために）1949
- Mill and Babel: Theories of the Liberation of Women（ミル ベーベル 婦人解放論）1949
- The Country of Peaceful Revolution: the U.K.（平和革命の国 イギリス）1954
- A Record of Two Generations of Women（女二代の記 私の半自叙伝）1956
- Memos of the Mito Domain in the Last Days of the Tokugawa Shogunate（覚書 幕末の水戸藩）1974
- For the Liberation of Women: Theories of Socialist Feminist Movements（女性解放へ 社会主義婦人運動論）1977
- Footprints of A Woman Walking in the 20th Century（二十世紀をあゆむ ある女の足あと）1978
- A Short History of Japanese Feminist movements（日本婦人運動小史）1979

Collection of Commentaries by Yamakawa Kikue

- Yamakawa, Kikue (1981). Collection of Yamakawa Kikue's Works.（山川菊栄集）Tokyo, Iwanami Shoten.
- Yamakawa, Kikue (1984). Collection of Commentaries on Women's Liberation by Yamakawa Kikue.（山川菊栄女性解放論集）Tokyo, Iwanami Shoten.
- Yamakawa, Kikue (1990). Collection of Commentaries by Yamakawa Kikue.（山川菊栄評論集）Tokyo, Iwanami Shoten.
- Yamakawa, Kikue (2011). Yamakawa Kikue shu hyouronhen（山川菊栄集 評論篇, Tokyo: Iwanami Shoten.
