= Toshiko Tamura =

Japanese writer (1884–1945)

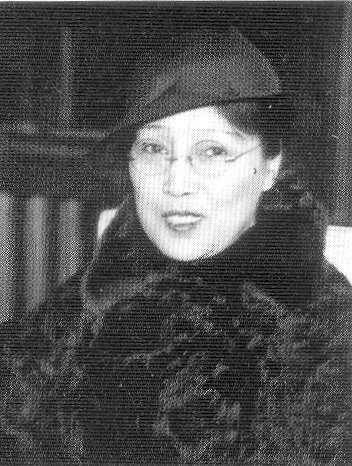
- Toshiko Tamura
- Born: 25 April 1884; Tokyo Japan
- Died: 16 April 1945 (aged 60); Shanghai, China
- Occupation: Writer
- Writing career
- Genre: Novels

Toshiko Tamura (田村 俊子, Tamura Toshiko; 25 April 1884 – 16 April 1945) was an early modern feminist novelist who wrote during the late Meiji era, Taishō era, and early Shōwa era. She wrote under the pen-names Roei (露英), Child Bird (鳥の子, Tori no ko), Toshiko Suzuki (鈴木 俊子, Suzuki Toshiko), Yukari (優香里, Yukari), Jun-Sheng (俊生), and Zuo Jun-zhi (佐俊芝), as well as under her maiden name Toshiko Satō (佐藤 俊子, Satō Toshiko) and her married name Toshiko Tamura, by which she is best known. Her birth name was Toshi Satō (佐藤 とし, Satō Toshi).

== Biography ==
Tamura was born in the plebeian Asakusa district of Tokyo, where her father was a rice broker. At the age of seventeen she entered the literature faculty of Nihon Joshi Daigaku Japan Women's University. However, the long commute by foot, from her home affected her health and forced her to withdraw after only a single term. After this withdrawal, in 1902, she began her writing career as a disciple of Rohan Kōda. Under his tutelage, she published her first work in 1903. However, in 1906, she decided to leave his circle, as she felt stifled by the classical Japanese style Kōda encouraged his students to write in. That same year, she joined a theater troupe, Mainichiha Bunshigeki (Mainichi Literati Theatre Troupe), and thus began her foray into a career as a stage actress. She would even become invested enough in theater to write numerous essays on it, as well as write two of her own plays, Yakimochi ("Jealousy", 1910) and Dorei ("Slave", 1914). In 1911, under pressure from her husband Shōgyo Tamura she submitted a novella entitled Akirame ("Resignation", 1911) to the Osaka Asahi Shimbun for a literary contest. She won first prize, and shortly after gave up her acting career to focus on writing. Her experiences in the theatre are illustrated in "Chooroo" (Mockery, 1912). She followed this with Miira no kuchibeni ("Lip Rouge on a Mummy", 1913), and Onna Sakusha ("Woman Writer", 1913). She became a best-selling writer, and contributed numerous works to such mainstream literary magazines as Chūō Kōrōn and Shincho. During this period of her early writing career, much of Tamura's writing focused on themes of social injustice resulting from sexism.

In 1918, she left her husband Shōgyo Tamura to follow her lover, Asahi Shimbun journalist Etsu Suzuki, to Vancouver, Canada. In 1933, she left Vancouver to live for a brief stint in Los Angeles, California until 1936, when she returned to Tokyo. During her time in North America, she mainly produced journalistic writing. On her return to Japan, she had an affair with leftist Tsurujirō Kubokawa. During the 1930s, particularly after she returned to Japan, Tamura's literary focus shifted from solely gender identity and women's issues to begin including problems of race and social class. On such topics, she wrote nine short stories and novellas, and over fifty essays.

In 1942, she moved to Shanghai, China, then under Japanese occupation, where she edited a Chinese literary magazine Nu-Sheng. She died of a brain hemorrhage in Shanghai in 1945, and her grave is at the temple of Tokei-ji in Kamakura.

After her death, her royalties were used to establish a literary prize for women writers.
