= Yaeko Nogami =

Japanese novelist

Nogami Yaeko
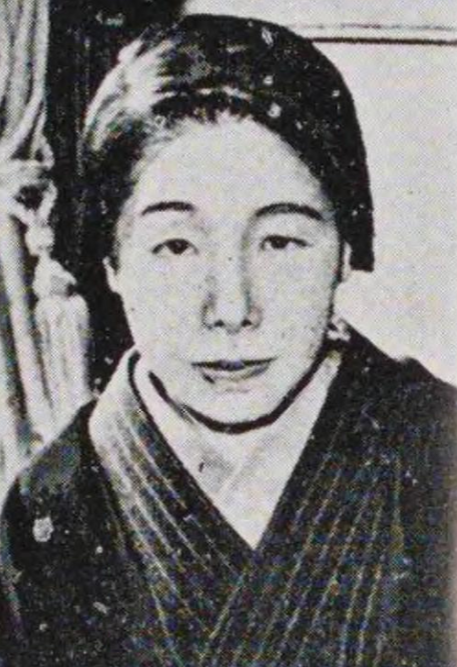
- Nogami Yaeko
- Born: 6 May 1885; Usuki, Ōita, Japan
- Died: 30 March 1985 (aged 99)
- Occupation: Writer
- Writing career
- Genre: novels

Yaeko Nogami (野上 弥生子, Nogami Yaeko; 6 May 1885 – 30 March 1985) was the pen-name of a novelist of the Shōwa period Japan. Her maiden name was Kotegawa Yae.

== Early life ==
Nogami was born in Usuki in Oita prefecture as the daughter of a wealthy sake brewer. She was taught at home by private tutors, including Kubo Kaizo, who introduced her to classic Chinese literature, classic Japanese literature and taught her the art of writing tanka poetry. She met the novelist Kinoshita Naoe, who persuaded her to enter the Meiji-Jogakkō, a Christian-orientated girls’ school in Tokyo. While a student in Tokyo, she met Nogami Toyoichirō, a student of Noh drama and English literature under Natsume Sōseki. They were married in 1906, but she continued to work towards literary recognition. Her first published work was a short story Enishi ("Ties of Love") in the literary magazine Hototogisu in 1907.

== Literary career ==
In the 1910s, Nogami submitted poems and short stories to the mainstream literary journal Chuo Koron, Shincho, and to the feminist magazine Seito, and gained a substantial following with fans of the proletarian literature movement. She maintained a correspondence with fellow female writers Yuasa Yoshiko and Miyamoto Yuriko, with whom she shared the sentiment that literature must serve a purpose towards increasing morality and social activism. In 1922, she published Kaijin maru ("The Neptune", tr. 1957), a shocking semi-factual account of four men in the crew of a wrecked fishing boat who must struggle with the choice of starvation or cannibalism. This novel was adapted into the 1962 film Ningen directed by Kaneto Shindo.

Nogami started to explore historical fiction in the 1920s, with Oishi Yoshio, a story about one of the Forty-seven Ronin in 1926. That same year, she and her husband translated Jane Austen's novel Pride and Prejudice into Japanese, which was the first translation of Austen into Japanese. Nogami liked Pride and Prejudice so much that in 1928 she published a novel, Machiko, that reset Pride and Prejudice in Taishō era Japan, with the heroine Machiko who was inspired by Elizabeth Bennet, the hero Mr. Kawai who was based on Mr. Darcy, and the villain Seki who was based on Wickham.

As the Japanese government turned increasingly toward totalitarianism and it appeared that war was inevitable, she and her husband traveled to Europe where they witnessed the outbreak of the Spanish Civil War and ominous signs that would lead up to World War II. They returned to Japan prior to the outbreak of World War II, and she concentrated on her writing. In the post-war period, she resumed her contacts with Miyamoto Yuriko, and joined her in the foundation of the Shin Nihon Bungakukai.

Her postwar output was prolific and varied, including the Yomiuri Prize-winning 1957 novel Meiro (迷路) and Hideyoshi to Rikyu ("Hideyoshi and Rikyu", 1962–1963), in which she explores the relationship between artist and patron (in this case Toyotomi Hideyoshi and Sen no Rikyū). The latter novel was adapted into the film Rikyu by Japanese director Hiroshi Teshigahara.

== See also ==
- Japanese literature
- List of Japanese authors
