= Tanno Setsu =

Japanese feminist and labor activist (1902–1987)

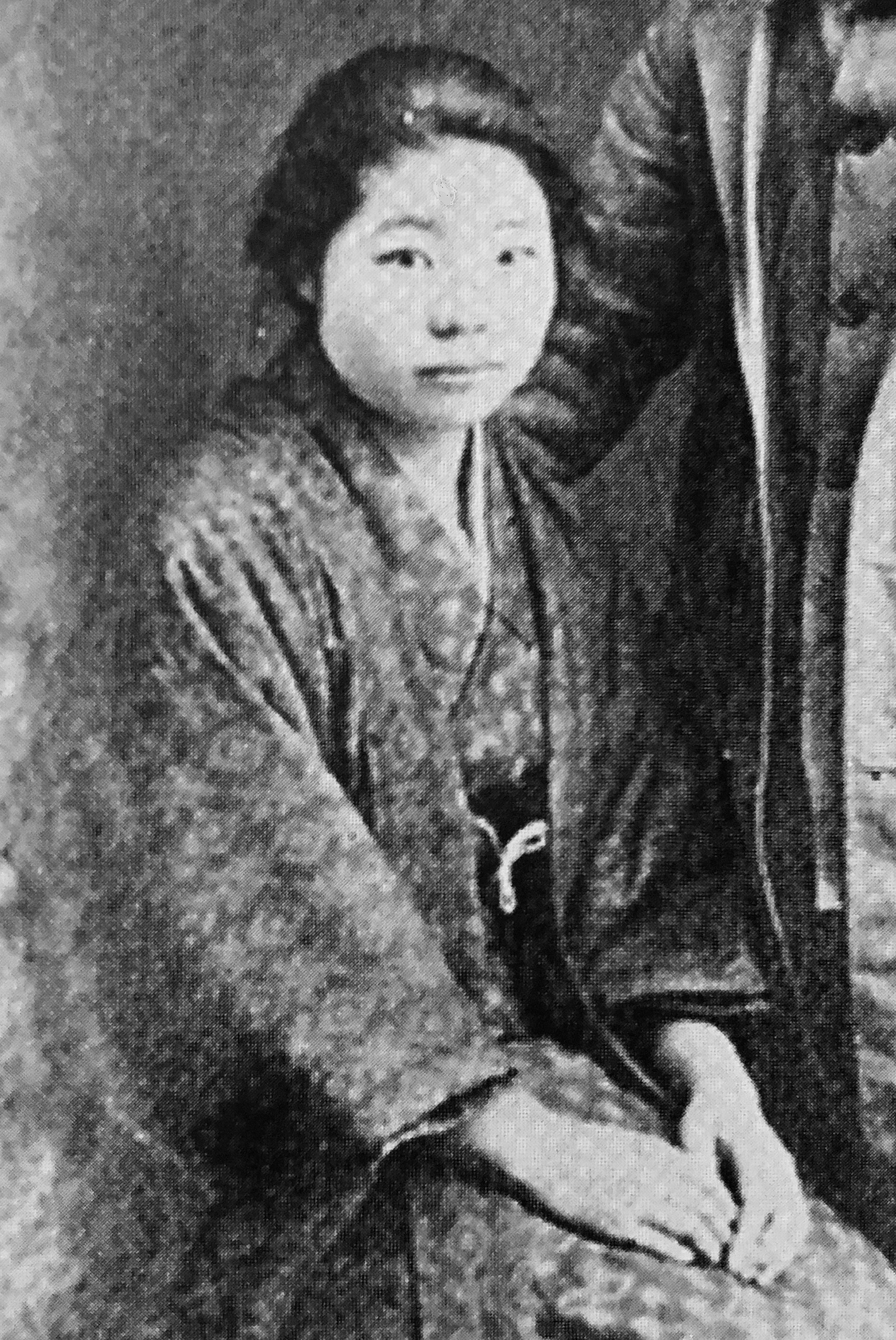
- from Japanese Women Volume 1, 1924
- Born: 1902; Onahama, Fukushima, Japan
- Died: 1987 (aged 84–85)
- Known for: Labor and feminist activism

Tanno Setsu (Japanese: 丹野セツ, 1902–1987) was a Japanese feminist, labor activist, Kameido Incident survivor, and an active member of Communist and Socialist Tokyo groups in the 1920s. Tanno became a member of the Nankatsu Labor Union, and was especially interested in its communist Hyōgikai wing where she established and was head of its women's division. Though many of her communist peers shifted to anarchist communism, Tanno and her husband, Watanabe Masanosuke, the Japanese Communist Party's general secretary, remained Bolshevist communists.

== Early life ==
Tanno Setsu was born in Fukushima prefecture in 1902 to a large family. She moved when she was 10 years old to Hitachi, Ibaraki prefecture when her father found a job as a carpenter building the Number Two Hydroelectric Plant in Daiyūin, the smelting district. Despite her father having an above average salary, her family was always short on money. She lived in a dirt floor tenement house intended for low-ranking miners without running water. As an adolescent, Tanno's responsibilities included caring for her baby sibling.

Tanno desired to enter school to become a teacher, but there was not enough money to do so. Instead, following her elementary school education, she went to Honzan hospital's nurse training school. The spring of her 16th birthday, her family was no longer able to support her financially, so Tanno paid for her clothes and food using the hospital's daily wage. During her studies, she was a subscriber to the magazine Fujin Kōron. Tanno was slowly exposed to communist and socialist policy by her male peers, Sōma Ichiro, Kawai Yoshitora, and Kitajima Kichizō, who had picked up socialism from Oka Sensei, a teacher at the nursing college who supported worker's liberation. She joined a coal mining union in 1919 connected with Japan General Federation of Labor.

== Early 1920s ==
=== Arrival to Tokyo ===
Tanno's friend, Kawai Yoshitora, moved to Tokyo in September 1920, but was quickly arrested and sent to prison in Sugamo for his ties to the Socialist Alliance. From prison, Kawai sent Tanno, Sōma, and Kitajima copies of Ōsugi Sakae's Labor News. In 1921 without fulfilling her required three years of service to the nursing school, she moved to Tokyo's Kameido district with Sōma and Kitajima to reunite with Kawai. She initially found a job at Juntendō Hospital with Kawai's help, but began work at an at-cost clinic in Shimbashi soon after. Under Kawai's encouragement, she joined the Gyōminkai (Enlightened People's Society), a communist study group, and began living at their office. She also became involved with the Sekirankai, a socialist organization for Japanese women, and was involved with many May Day demonstrations.

During this time, Tanno began studying English at Kanda English-language School and organized a club to analyze Tane Maku Hito, a proletarian magazine. After an incident where a student of the school attempted to publish poetic works speaking out against the government in a new magazine, Tanno was questioned by police, and her involvement with left-leaning groups was written in newspapers at the time. Her family encouraged Tanno to return home under the false pretense that her mother was sick, with the intention of preventing Tanno from returning and participating further in Japan's growing socialist movement. Amid a festival crowd, Tanno was able to flee from her family to a train station and escape back to Tokyo.

=== Formation of the Nankatsu Labor Union ===
Tanno continued attending Gyōminkai and Sekirankai meetings upon her return to Tokyo in 1922. She also joined the Nankatsu Labor Union, founded by Masanosuke Watanabe in 1922, along with Kawai, Kitajima, and Sōma.

Believing that intellectual groups would not help change conditions for workers, Tanno quit her job in nursing and began working in Kameido district as a Seikosha watch factory worker under the name Sakanoue Kiyo. At this time, the Japanese communist part was dividing into anarchist and Bolshevist wings, and Tanno was aligned with the latter.

Tanno met Watanabe Masanosuku upon seeing his lecture on Das Kapital during a Gyōminkai meeting. Kawai Yoshitora encouraged the two together, and they became friends. When Tanno was lured home by family to Onahama a third time, Watanabe attempted to persuade her family to let her return with him to Tokyo, but was unsuccessful. Tanno managed to escape and return to Kameido in January 1923.

In March 1923, she joined the Nankatsu Labor Union on their walk from Tokyo to Noda, Chiba in support of a soy sauce manufacturer's strike. In April, she joined Kawai Yoshitora's newly created Communist Youth League. Police began arresting those associated with the communist party in June, but members were quickly released and went into hiding. Watanabe turned himself in to authorities, believing his incarceration would prevent further arrests, and was taken to prison in Ichigaya. Tanno then moved in with Watanabe's mother.

=== Surviving the Great Kantō Earthquake and Kameido Incident ===
While on her way to attend a Yōkakai meeting, the 1923 Great Kantō earthquake struck. She rushed home to check on Watanabe's mother who was alive and had nearly escaped the collapse of her home. The fires and impending tsunami encouraged Tanno to flee across the Katsunishi Bridge with Kawai's family and Watanabe's mother. Upon her return, many of the displaced Nankatsu Labor Union members chose to live in the office, taking turns watching out for the authorities.

On September 2, 1923, the Special Higher Police came and arrested between 6 and 8 Nankatsu Labor Union members at their office in an event known as the Kameido Incident. Tanno managed to escape by giving her alias Sakanoue Kiyo and running to hide on the second-floor window's ledge behind a sliding tatami door. The Kameido police continued to make arrests, and many of the union members were killed in prison, including Tanno's nursing school friends Kawai Yoshitora and Kitajima Kichizō.

Tanno Setsu married Watanabe Masanosuke in 1924.

== Late 1920s ==
In 1926, Tanno went underground with the Nankatsu Labor Union, hiding out in For Rent Houses from authorities. Money was very scarce, and she was almost recognized and arrested on several occasions.

=== Nankatsu Labor Union Women's department proposal ===
Tanno attempted to propose to Nankatsu Labor Union's communist Hyōgikai wing the formation of a Women's Department in 1926. However, her proposal was rejected by Hyōgikai leaders on the basis that a new department specifically for women was unnecessary. Together with Watanabe, Tanno proposed the department again and became the head of the new department in 1927.

=== Imprisonment of Nanshoku Labor Union members ===
On March 15, 1928, many Nankatsu Labor Union members were discovered and arrested. Tanno, and others who remained, continued to shift their residence around and operating under aliases, with the men dressing as stock brokers. However, many members continued to be arrested, and incidents between the police and communist members began to make newspaper headlines. On December 3, 1928, Tanno jumped through a window to escape police, but was quickly caught after jumping a fence. She was incarcerated at Tomizaka Police Station, where she was questioned for three days and brutally beaten. After a week, Tanno learned from the police officials that her husband Watanabe had been killed in Formosa. Tanno was transferred around to multiple police stations before her trial on October 3, 1928. In prison, she contracted tuberculosis and temporarily left on parole. Though she attempted to avoid the authorities, Tanno was rearrested.

=== Release ===
Tanno remained in prison until September 1938. Immediately following her release, she tried to flee to China, but was unable to. Following World War II, Tanno's activism transitioned from advocating socialism to hospital administration and reform. She established and later became director of Yotsugi Clinic in Katsushika, Tokyo.

== Personal life ==
=== Relationship with family ===
Tanno had a strained relationship with her family, who did not share her political beliefs. On multiple occasions, she was lured home by letters saying someone had become sick, only to find everyone well. On her return trips home, she was often locked in her room and not allowed to leave without a family escort. On at least one occasion, she was physically beaten by her younger brother.

=== Relationship with Watanabe Masanosuke ===
Tanno met Watanabe in 1923 during a Gyōminkai meeting presentation of Das Kapital. At the time, Watanabe's previous girlfriend, a worker at the Nagamine Celluloid Factory, had left him because her parents could not support Watanabe's political views. Tanno and Watanabe were initially not very close, but urged together by their mutual friend Kawai Yoshitora, a relationship began. In 1924, Tanno and Watanabe married, and began their married life in the Nankatsu labor union office alongside Watanabe's mother. They never had children.
