= Red wave =

Red wave or Red Wave may refer to:

== Music ==
- Red Wave, a Russian rock album

== Sports ==
- Fujitsu Red Wave, a Japanese women's basketball team
- Riverside Red Wave, an American minor league baseball team

== Politics ==
- Red Wave Society, a Japanese socialist women's organization
- Red wave election, a cycle of elections in the United States
  - 1994 red wave, a series of elections in 1994 in the United States
  - 2010 red wave, a series of elections in 2010 in the United States
