= Kawai Yoshitora =

Japanese communist activist (1902–1923)

Yoshitora Kawai
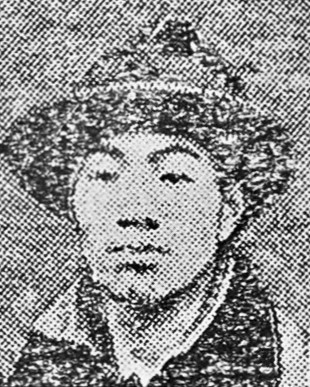
- Photo of Kawai from an Asahi Shinbun article reporting the Kameido Incident, 12 October 1923
- Born: 18 July 1902; Ueda, Nagano Prefecture, Empire of Japan
- Died: 4 September 1923 (aged 21); Komeido-Chō, Minami Katsushika-gun, Tōkyō, Empire of Japan
- Cause of death: Assassination

Yoshitora Kawai (Japanese: 川合 義虎; 1902–1923) was a Japanese communist activist involved with many Tokyo-based political groups.

Kawai attended Honzan hospital's nurse training school, but moved to Tokyo's Kameido district in September 1920 after being exposed to socialism by a professor, Oka-sensei. He was a member of Gyōminkai (Enlightened People's Society), a communist study group, and joined the Nankatsu Labor Union alongside Tanno Setsu. In March 1923, Kawai created the Tokyo Communist Youth League, the first instance of a Japanese group openly labeling themselves as communists. During the 1923 Great Kantō earthquake, Kawai was reported as having rescued three children who had been trapped under a collapsed house. Amidst the chaos of the earthquake's aftermath, he was captured on 2 September 1923, and a few days later, was killed by police in prison during the Kameido Incident.
