= Jun Tsuji =

Japanese writer (1884–1944)

Tsuji Jun
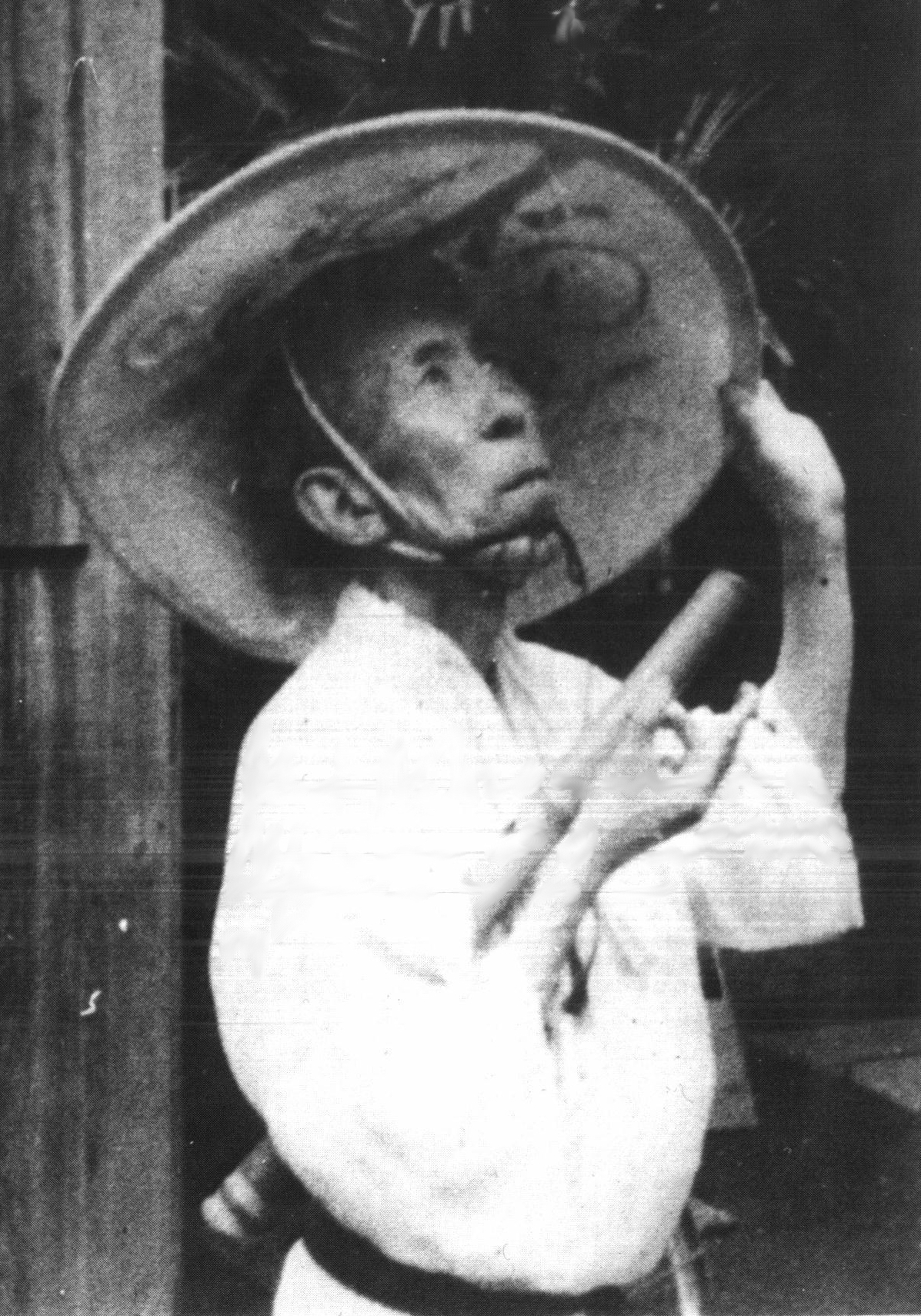
- Born: October 4, 1884; Tōkyō, Japan
- Died: November 24, 1944 (aged 60); Tōkyō, Japan
- Cause of death: Starvation

Philosophical work
- Era: 20th century philosophy
- School: Nihilism, Epicureanism, Egoist anarchism, Individualist anarchism, Dada
- Main interests: Stirner, vagabondage, Shakuhachi as Dada, Japanese Buddhism
- Notable ideas: Dada as the Creative Nothing, the Unmensch

The cover of Jun Tsuji's translated edition of The Ego and Its Own.

Tsuji Jun (辻 潤, Tsuji Jun; October 4, 1884 – November 24, 1944) was a Japanese author: a poet, essayist, playwright, and translator. He has also been described as a Dadaist, nihilist, Epicurean, shakuhachi musician, actor and bohemian. He translated Max Stirner's The Ego and Its Own and Cesare Lombroso's The Man of Genius into Japanese.

Born in Tōkyō, Tsuji sought escape in literature from a childhood he described as "nothing but destitution, hardship, and a series of traumatizing difficulties". He became interested in the works of Tolstoy, Kōtoku Shūsui's socialist anarchism, and the literature of Oscar Wilde and Voltaire, among many others. Later, in 1920 Tsuji was introduced to Dada and became a self-proclaimed first Dadaist of Japan, a title also claimed by Tsuji's contemporary, Shinkichi Takahashi. Tsuji became a fervent proponent of Stirnerite egoist anarchism, which would become a point of contention between himself and Takahashi. He wrote one of the prologues for famed feminist poet Hayashi Fumiko's 1929 (I Saw a Pale Horse (蒼馬を見たり, Ao Uma wo Mitari) and was active in the radical artistic circles of his time.

== Individualist anarchism ==
Tsuji was influenced by the philosophy of Epicurus, and many characteristics of Epicureanism show through his lifestyle. For example, Tsuji avoided active engagement in politics and sought after a form of ataraxia, which he was apparently able to experience through vagabond wandering and Egoism. He also spent his time primarily trying to enjoy a simple life free of suffering (see Aponia). While his writings themselves are significant, it seems Tsuji's own emphasis was on developing an experimental, liberated lifestyle. Most of Tsuji's writings describe the philosophy behind this, as well as the personal process Tsuji went through towards this aim. As Hagiwara Kyōjirō (萩原 恭次郎) wrote, “Tsuji chose not to express himself with a pen so much as he chose to express himself through living, as conveyed by his personality. That is, Tsuji himself was his expression's piece of work”.

== Death of an Epicurean ==
One notable play written by Tsuji is the dadaist/absurdist Death of an Epicurean (享楽主義者の死, Kyōraku-shugi-sha no Shi), in which a figure must confront Panta Rhei, or the transient nature of all things. Tsuji saw the concept of Panta Rhei to be related to Stirner's Creative Nothing, wherein the nihility of all things provides potential for creativity and change. Tsuji also found this relevant to the Buddhist concept of nothingness.

In Death of an Epicurean, Tsuji comments on the destruction of the Ryōunkaku (Cloud-surpassing Tower) in the area of Tokyo he often called home, Asakusa. This building was a skyscraper that had become very much a symbol of modernity in Japan, and its destruction in the 1923 Great Kantō earthquake was a harrowing omen to many who saw it as reminiscent of the Tower of Babel. Authors such as Ishikawa Takuboku popularized the building's symbolism in literature.

== Censorship and vagabondage ==
Tsuji wrote during the 1920s, a dangerous period in Japanese history for controversial writers, during which he experienced the wages of censorship through police harassment. He also experienced this vicariously through the persecution of close associates such as his former wife, anarcha-feminist Itō Noe, who was murdered in the Amakasu Incident.

For being a controversial writer in the heart of Tokyo's radical art scene, Tsuji himself believed that had he been living instead as a peasant in the Soviet Union at the time, he would surely have been shot to death.

== Institutionalization, Buddhist renunciation, and death ==
In 1932 Tsuji was institutionalized in a psychiatric hospital after what would become popularly known as the "Tengu Incident". According to some accounts, one night during a party at a friend's residence, Tsuji climbed to the second floor and began flapping his arms crying "I am the Tengu!", eventually jumping from the building, running around, and jumping onto the table calling "kyaaaaaa, kyaaaa!!"

After hospitalization, Tsuji was diagnosed as having experienced a temporary psychosis probably resulting from his chronic alcoholism. During this hospitalization Tsuji came to idealize the Buddhist monk Shinran and read the Tannishō many times over. Thereafter the once prolific Tsuji gave up his writing career, and he returned to his custom of vagabondage in the fashion of a Komusō monk, apparently as a sort of Nekkhamma.

For the next few years Tsuji fell into various incidents with police and was readmitted to mental hospitals several times. At the age of 41 Tsuji suffered a major asthma attack and after hospitalization became weighed down with substantial hospital bills. While book royalties and a sort of "Tsuji Jun Fan Club" (辻潤後援会, Tsuji Jun kōenkai) provided some economic support, Tsuji was caught up in a harsh late World War II economic environment and spent the last few years of his life in vagabond poverty. Tsuji often made ends meet by going door to door as a busking shakuhachi musician.

However, in 1944, Tsuji settled down in a friend's one-bedroom apartment in Tokyo, where he was found dead from starvation.

Tsuji is now buried in Tokyo's Saifuku Temple.

== Legacy ==
Tsuji is remembered for having helped found Dadaism in Japan along with contemporaries such as Murayama Tomoyoshi, MAVO, Yoshiyuki Eisuke, and Takahashi Shinkichi. Moreover, he was one of the most prominent Japanese contributors to Nihilist philosophy prior to World War II. He is also remembered as the father of prominent Japanese painter, Makoto Tsuji (辻 まこと).

Tsuji was depicted in the 1969 film Eros + Massacre and has been the subject of several Japanese books and articles.
