= Kameido incident =

1923 massacre of social activists in Japan

- Part of Kantō Massacre
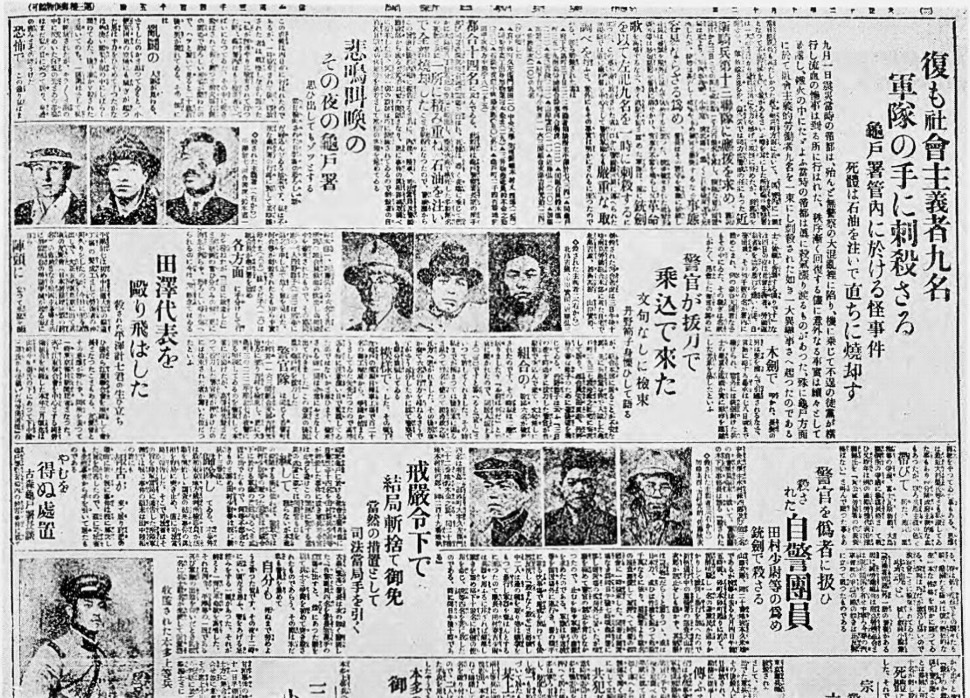
- Asahi Shinbun article reporting the incident, 12 October 1923
- Location: Kameido Police Station, Kameido-machi, Minami Katsushika-gun (present-day Kōtō-ku), Tōkyō-fu
- Date: 3–5 September 1923
- Deaths: 10 Japanese labor activists
- Victims: Keishichi Hirasawa, Yoshitora Kawai, Kōju Katō, Kichizō Kitashima, Kōzō Kondō, Kinji Satō, Naoichi Suzuki, Jitsuji Yamagishi, Kōji Yoshimura Uhachi Nakatsuji
- Perpetrators: Kameido Police, 13th Cavalry Regiment (Japanese Imperial Army)

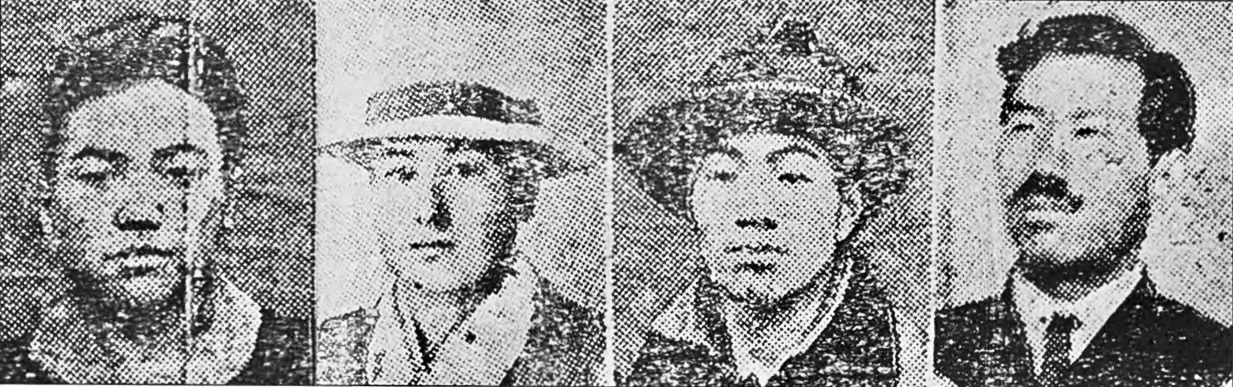
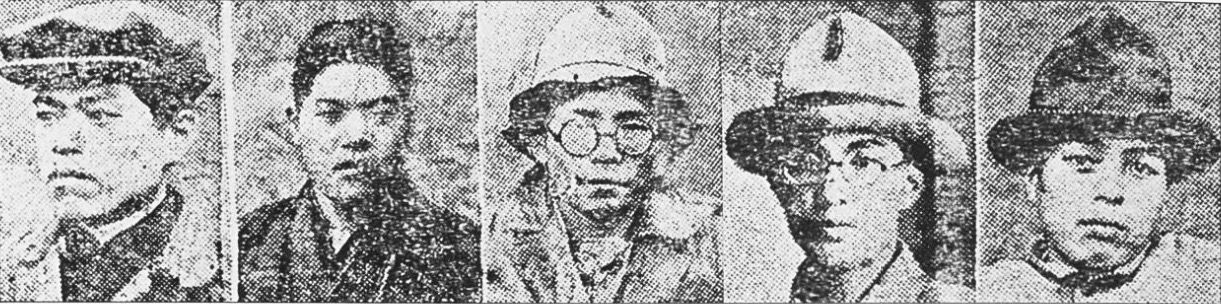
9 of the 10 activists.
Above, from left: Kichizō Kitashima, Naoichi Suzuki, Yoshitora Kawai, Keishichi Hirasawa
Below, from left: Kinji Satō, Kōji Yoshimura, Kōju Katō, Kōzō Kondō, Jitsuji Yamagishi

The Kameido Incident (亀戸事件, Kameido jiken) was a 1923 massacre in which ten Japanese labor activists were detained and executed by police and military troops in Kameido. This took place during Kameido's mass arrests and executions on 3–5 September 1923, one of a series of massacres committed under martial law during the chaotic aftermath of the Great Kantō Earthquake by Japanese police, military, and civilian vigillantes, with implicit government approval. The massacres targeted mainly Koreans, but also Chinese, as well as Japanese left-wing activists. It was claimed that the victims were intending to use the crisis as an opportunity to spread disorder or overthrow the Japanese government, but it was in fact the government who took advantage of the situation to bureaucratically massacre undesireables.

== Background ==
On 1 September 1923, the Great Kantō Earthquake struck Tokyo and Yokohama, and martial law was imposed. In the following days, police spread false rumors of Korean rioting, and gave civilians permission to kill Koreans, resulting in thousands of deaths. Amidst the mob violence, regional police and the army sought to use the pretext of civil unrest to eliminate political dissidents, namely communist, socialist, and anarchist leaders.

Under martial law, command of Southern Tokyo was given to Maomi Ishimitsu, Commander of the 1st Division. On 3 September, Ishimitsu issued a directive to his regimental commanders reading: "Koreans are not necessarily all malcontents; one must not forget that there are Japanese individuals who seek to exploit them. Appropriate guidance is required." This resulted in military units making their own judgements, explicitly targeting and killing Koreans and activists who they deemed "malcontents", demanding that activists detained by police be handed over to them.

Upon receiving rumors of Korean rioting, Kameido Police Chief Shigetaka Komori fervently initiated action against Koreans, Chinese, and labor activists, without attempting to first confirm the rumors. On the evening of 3 September, the Kameido Police began arresting Koreans, Chinese, and known social activists, under claims that they would "spread disorder or forment revolution amid the confusion". Despite numbering just over 230 officers, the Kameido Police had detained 1,300 people by the night of 4 September.

== Incident ==
On the night of 3 September, two days after the earthquake, a large number of local police detained union leader Keishichi Hirasawa, who had been assisting at the collapsed home of a friend and participating in a night watch patrol. Local police also arrested Uhachi Nakatsuji of the Pure Labor Union. Shortly after 22:00, the Kameido Police's Special Higher Police arrived at the head office of Nankatsu Labor Union in Kameido, a group that they had long been monitoring as persons of interest in labor issues. Police detained seven members of the group, who had been assisting with relief efforts for other victims of the disaster. Army troops later detained an eighth member of the association, Kinji Satō.

Police claimed that inside Kameido Police Station, Yoshitora Kawai began loudly singing revolutionary songs to raise spirits within the prison cells, which were pitch black due to power outages. Fearing that Kawai would incite the prisoners and escalate unrest, the Kameido Police requested reinforcements from the 13th Cavalry Regiment (of the 1st Division), which was stationed nearby. However, testimony from those detained at the time indicates that this was merely police pretext, as they neither sang any songs nor attempted to incite others.

On the morning of 4 September, Kyōichi Yashima, a fellow labor activist and friend of Keishichi Hirasawa, encountered a police officer he recognized, who was transporting kerosene and firewood on a cart. Yashima overheard the officer say, "I'm on my way to burn the people I killed," "I was kept up all night killing people," and "I killed 320 people...including seven or eight socialists". Yashima later personally witnessed the massacred bodies of 200-300 Chinese and Koreans in the nearby district of Ōjima 8-chōme. He also discovered Keishichi Hirasawa's shoes among the bodies, leading him to believe that Hirasawa and the others had been killed.

Between 3–5 September, at the Kameido Police Station, the ten activists were executed with bayonettes by the soldiers of the 13th Cavalry Regiment, who disposed of their bodies along the banks of the Arakawa drainage canal.

== Victims ==
- Keishichi Hirasawa - Proletarian playwright and author, and organizer of unions including the Pure Labor Union and Sōrengō, a unified nation-wide body for labor unions throughout in Japan
- Yoshitora Kawai - Founder of the Communist Youth League, member of the Nankatsu Labor Union
- Kōju Katō - Nankatsu member
- Kichizō Kitashima - Nankatsu member
- Kōzō Kondō - Nankatsu member
- Uhachi Nakatsuji - Member of the Pure Labor Union
- Kinji Satō - Nankatsu member
- Naoichi Suzuki - Nankatsu member
- Jitsuji Yamagishi - Nankatsu member
- Kōji Yoshimura - Nankatsu member

== Aftermath ==
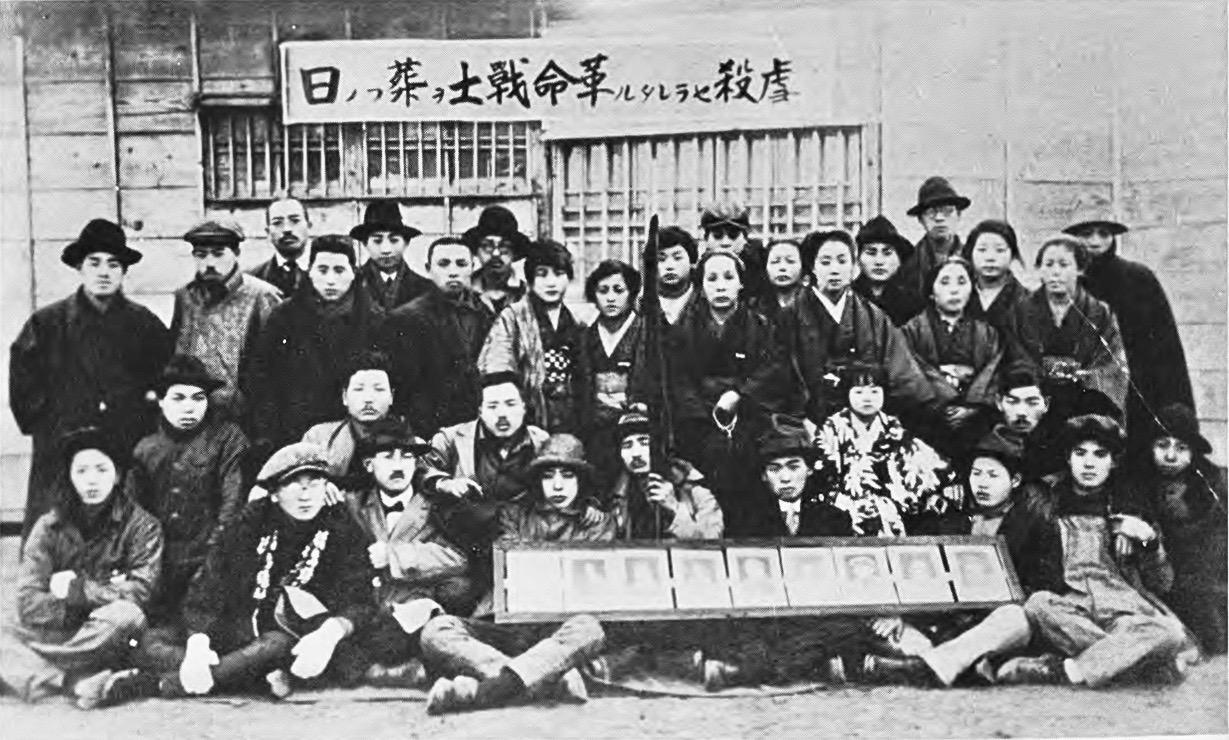
On 17 February 1924, the victims' families and comrades from the Nankatsu Labor Union gather before the memorial, holding nine portraits of the deceased. The third person from the left in the middle row is Masanosuke Watanabe.

The incident was finally acknowledged by the police on October 10, more than a month after it occurred, and was reported in newspapers the following day. Police issued an official statement claiming that troops had shot the men because they were trying to incite the other prisoners. All newspapers were banned from reporting the broader scale or death count of the Kantō massacres, as part of Tokyo officials' plan to minimize the events and frame Korean rioters. Martial law was officially ended on 15 November.

The authorities were denounced by family and friends of the victims, the Nankatsu Labor Union, and Sōdōmei, the national labor union alliance. Lawyers Tatsuji Fuse and Kesaji Yamazaki of the Japan Lawyers Association for Freedom demanded an investigation and judicial action, and saw partial success, but the army was not held responsible, given that their actions were committed under martial law. Police claimed to have cremated the remains of the victims. With no remains to bury, a memorial service was held in February 1924.

On 4 September 1970, a monument to the victims was erected at Jōdoshū Kyōchizan Jōshin-ji Temple, located near the site of the incident, and a memorial service is held there annually by an organizing committee.

== Other deaths in Kameido ==
Between 3–5 September, dozens of Koreans and a number Chinese and Japanese were killed by the 13th Cavalry Regiment inside the Kameido Police Station. The Kameido Police's jurisdiction was home to a large population of Chinese laborers. According to Kyōichi Yashima's testimony, at least 300 mostly Chinese and Korean detainees were executed and disposed of between 3–5 September. These non-Japanese victims of Kameido are far less discussed in discourse surrounding the incident.

On 4 September, four unruly Japanese vigilantes were also arrested by Kameido police and killed after showing defiance. This is sometimes referred to as the "first Kameido incident", with the murder of the 10 activists being called the "second Kameido incident".

The total death toll of the massacres across Kantō was at least 6,000 victims, mostly ethnic Koreans.

== See also ==
- Amakasu Incident
