= Masanosuke =

- Gender: Male

Origin
- Origin: Japanese
- Meaning: Different meanings depending on the kanji used

Masanosuke (written: 雅之助 or 政之輔) is a masculine Japanese given name. Notable people with the name include:

- Masanosuke Fukuda (福田 雅之助; 1897–1974), Japanese tennis player
- Masanosuke Watanabe (渡辺 政之輔; 1899–1928), Japanese communist
