= Sekirankai =

Japanese socialist women's organization

The Sekirankai (赤瀾会; Red Wave Society) was a Japanese socialist women's organization active in 1921. Members of an anarchist group established the organization in April 1921. Prominent feminists Yamakawa Kikue and Noe Itō were advisers for the group, which participated in that year's May Day activities, published the magazine Omedetashi, held seminars and lectures, and distributed anti-war leaflets to the army. Their manifesto condemned capitalism, arguing that it turned women into slaves and prostitutes. The Sekirankai was the first women's socialist association and clashed with Shin Fujin Kyōkai (the New Women's Association). The organization dissolved eight months after its creation.

== History ==
=== Founding ===
The Sekirankai was formed at time in Imperial Japan when socialist thought gained enough momentum to be expressed publicly.

The Sekirankai was founded in April 1921 from an anarchist group established by Sakai Magara, Kutsumi Fusako, Hashiura Haruno, and Akizuki Shizue. Advisers for the organization were Yamakawa Kikue and Noe Itō. The society had about 42 members, 17 of whom were active. As members of the Sekirankai had personal ties with Nihon Shakai Shugi Dōmei (Japan Socialist League), the organization has been referred to as the "women's office" of the league.

The Sekirankai sought to overthrow the capitalist system. Their platform stated "We will fight any form of oppression that keeps us and our brothers and sisters in ignorance, poverty, and positions of subordination."

=== May Day protest ===
One of the first activities of the organization was to plan for that year's May Day, a day adopted by socialist and communist groups to represent International Workers' Day. The previous year's May Day activities, held in Tokyo's Ueno Park, were Japan's first public celebration of May Day and were estimated to include 5000 people. For the event, Yamakawa Kikue drafted a manifesto titled Fujin ni Gekisu (Manifesto to Women) that decried capitalism for engendering imperialism and framed the problems of capitalism from a feminist standpoint, and it the manifesto made into leaflets to be distributed at the event. The manifesto read:

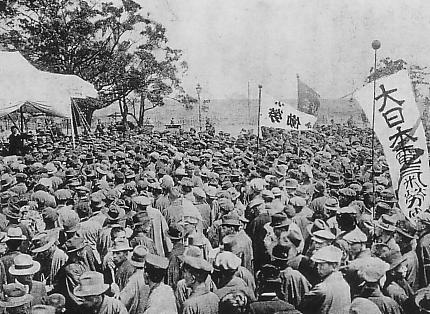
Japan's first Labor Day in 1920

May Day is the day for the proletarians, for us workers who are oppressed. For centuries and centuries, women and workers have endured together a history of oppression and ignorance. But the dawn is approaching. The morning gong that was struck in Russia signals the first step in the victory that will minute by minute banish the darkness of capitalism from the face of the earth. Sisters, listen to the power of women that is embodied in that sound of the gong. Let us exert the utmost of our strength and, together with our brothers, strike the gong that will signal the liberation of the proletarians of Japan. Women who are awake, join the May Day march!

The Sekirankai is a women's organization that plans to participate in the enterprise to destroy the capitalist society and build a socialist society. The capitalist society turns us into slaves at home and oppresses us as wages slaves outside the home. It turns many of our sisters into prostitutes. Its imperialistic ambitions rob us of our beloved fathers, children, sweethearts, and brothers and turn them into cannon fodder. It forces them and proletarians of other countries to brutally kill each other. It is a society that, for the sake of its greedy profiteers, crushes and sacrifices our youth, health, talents, all chance for happiness, even our lives, and feels no compassion. The Sekirankai declares all-out war on this cruel, shameless society. Women who wish to be liberated, join the Sekirankai!

Socialism offers the only way to save mankind from the oppressions and abuses of capitalism. Sisters who love justice and morality, join the socialist movement!

— Manifesto drafted for the society by Yamakawa Kikue

About 20 women members of the Sekirankai marched during the May Day activities. They carried red and black flags that were made by Hashiura Haruko and smaller flags painted with "R. W." for Red Wave. They paraded through the political meeting. All of the women were arrested. Sensational accounts of the event from journalists resulted in government restrictions on the organization's movements but the women's activities were placed into the national spotlight. During the Mayday demonstration of the following year, women's participants would be seen all over the country.

=== Other activities ===
In June 1921, members of the Sekirankai held a lecture on women's issues at Kanda Seinen Kaikan. Yamakawa Kikue, Itō Noe, Kutsumi Fusako, Fujimori Seikichi, Sakai Magara, Eguchi Kan, and Ishikawa Sanshirō were lecturers at the meeting. In July, the Sekirankai held a five-day seminar and published the magazine Omedetashi (Auspicious Magazine). In October 1921, they participated in the Guntai Sekka Jiken (Communization of the Army Incident) and distributed anti-war leaflets to the army through the mail.

=== Conflicts with the New Women's Association ===
The Sekirankai were also critical of their fellow Japanese women's organization, Shin Fujin Kyōkai (New Women's Association), formed in 1920. The Sekirankai found the bourgeois nature of the New Women's Association to be antithetical to the cause of women's rights, and Yamakawa offered harsh criticisms in an article for the July 1921 issue of Taiyō, "The New Women's Association and the Red Wave Society." She wrote there that "Revolution is essential for women. Only the Sekirankai can provide the answer." The article alone would have been a blow to the New Women's Association, but the timing of it made the impact even more profound, as the article appeared right on the tail of prominent New Women's Association leader Ichikawa Fusae's resignation from the organization. In the article, Yamakawa focused her criticism on New Women's Association leader Hiratsuka Raichō, believing that the group focused solely on the problems of upper-class women while ignoring the harsh realities that working-class women faced.

=== Dissolution ===
By the end of 1921, the activities of the Sekirankai had come to a halt. At the time, the restrictive Public Order and Police Law of 1900 (治安警察法 Chian Keisatsu Hō) prohibited worker strikes and labor organizations in a crack down on speech and assembly. Due to Article 5, women in particular were prohibited from attending political meetings or joining political organizations. In addition to this governmental oppression, pressure from the public eye was a powerful detractor. Throughout newspapers, feminist and socialist societies were vilified as degenerates and were the object of derision for numerous cartoonists such as Okamoto Ippei and Kitazawa Rakute. This created a distrust of these kinds of organizations within the public consciousness, and those who may have otherwise been swayed to join found themselves averse to the idea. This public criticism combined with the governmental oppression and the animosity of other women's organization to contribute to the dissolution of the organization in December, only eight months after it was founded. Many members of the organization went on to form spin-off groups such as the discussion group Suiyōkai (Wednesday Society) and the organization Yōkakai (Eighth Day Society), which would continue to carry Sekirankai ideals.

== Ideology ==
The group approached feminism through a Marxist lens, exploring the problems that women faced as issues of class and commodification. Much of the group's ideological tenets found root in the writings of Yamakawa Kikue, a Japanese feminist and socialist writer who was also a prominent member of the Sekirankai. Under these Marxist lines of thought, the Sekirankai believed that economic independence was a crucial step in achieving gender parity; however, according to their manifesto, they believed that the abolition of capitalism in favor of socialism was a prerequisite for this.

== Members ==
- Kutsumi Fusako
- Sakai Magara, daughter of Toshihiko Sakai
- Hashiura Haruka
- Akizuki Shizue
- Kitagawa Chiyo
- Hashiura Oriku
- Noe Itō
- Iwasa Shige
- Takasu Tayoko
- Takano Chiyo
- Takeuchi Hide
- Tanno Setsu
- Nakamura Miki
- Hashiura Riku
- Yoshikawa Kazuko
- Yamakawa Kikue
- Tachibara Oko
- Sano Manabu
- Yabe Hatsuko
- Watanabe Kō

== See also ==
- Feminism in Japan
- Socialist thought in Imperial Japan

== Bibliography ==
- Hane, Mikiso (1988). "The Sekirankai". Reflections on the Way to the Gallows: Rebel Women in Prewar Japan. Berkeley: University of California Press. pp. 125–174.
- Mackie, Vera (2002). Creating Socialist Women in Japan: Gender, Labour and Activism, 1900-1937. Cambridge: Cambridge University Press.
- James L. McClain, Japan: A Modern History p 390
- Tokuza, Akiko (1999). The Rise of the Feminist Movement in Japan (1st ed.). Tokyo: Keio Univ. Press.
