= Ichiko Kamichika =

Japanese politician

- 神近 市子
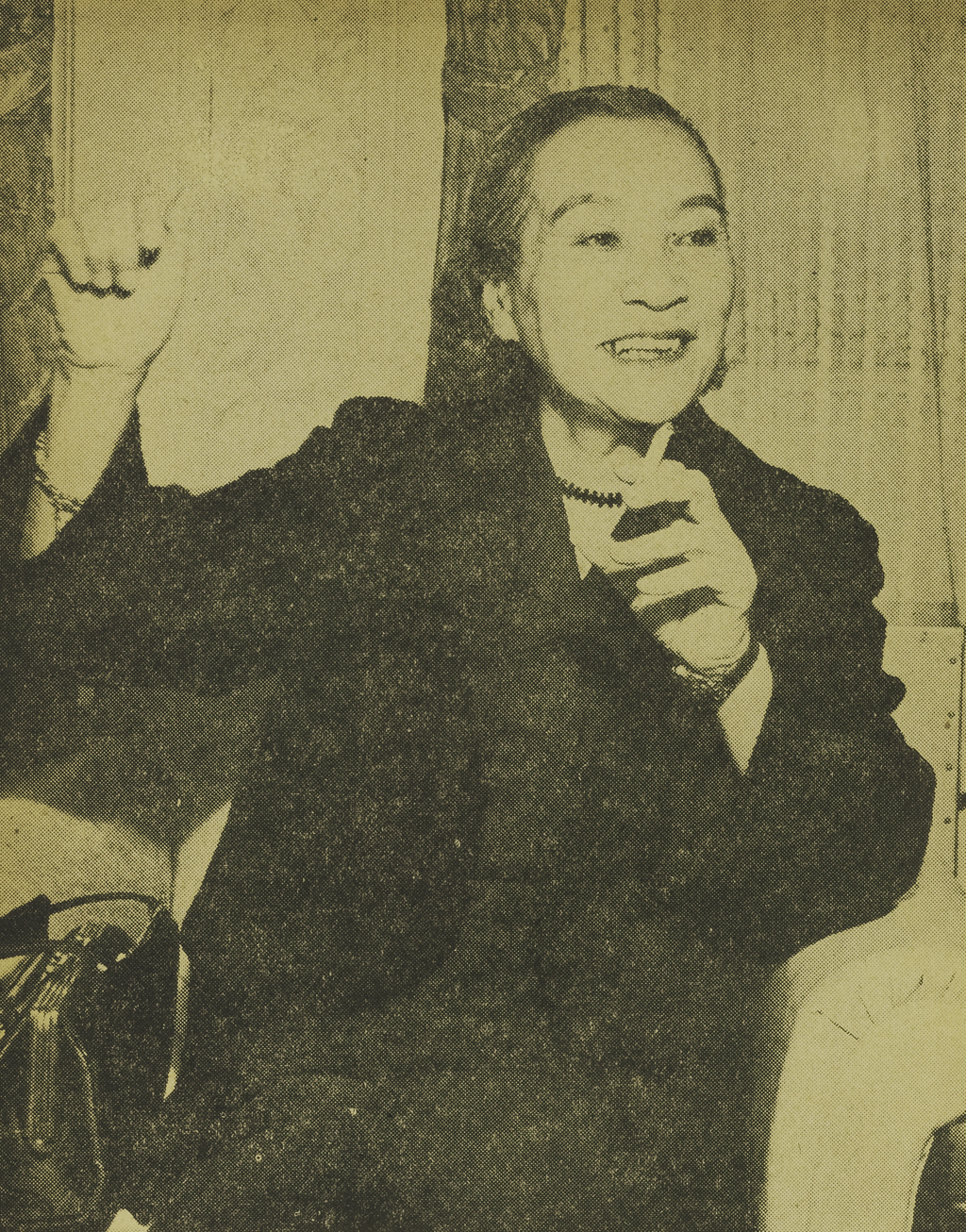

Member of the House of Representatives
- In office 21 November 1963 – 2 December 1969
- Preceded by: Senpachi Suzuki
- Succeeded by: Morio Aoyagi
- Constituency: Tokyo 5th
- In office 19 April 1953 – 24 October 1960
- Preceded by: Ichimatsu Ishida
- Succeeded by: Senpachi Suzuki
- Constituency: Tokyo 5th

Personal details
- Born: 6 June 1888 Saza, Nagasaki, Japan
- Died: August 1, 1981 (aged 93) Tokyo, Japan
- Party: Socialist
- Other political affiliations: LSP (1953–1955)
- Education: Tsuda University

Ichiko Kamichika (神近 市子, Kamichika Ichiko) (June 6, 1888 – August 1, 1981) was a journalist, feminist, writer, translator, and critic. Her birth name was Ichi Kamichika and her pen name was Ei, Yo, or Ou Sakaki (榊 纓). After World War II, Kamichika served in the Japanese House of Representatives as a member of the Japan Socialist Party.

== Early life ==
Kamichika was born in what is now Saza, Nagasaki on June 6, 1888. Kamichika grew up in relative poverty due to the death of her father and eldest brother at a young age. After grade school, Kamichika convinced her family to allow her to attend an American missionary school for girls in Nagasaki and in 1909 she moved to Tokyo to train as a teacher at Tsuda University. At Tsuda University she began contributing to the feminist literary magazine Bluestocking (青鞜, Seitō). After graduation she became a teacher at the Aomori Prefectural School for Girls, until she was asked to leave when the school principal discovered her name in an issue of the Bluestocking magazine. In 1914, Kamichika returned to Tokyo and began working as a reporter at the Tokyo Nichi Nichi Shimbun. Her strong English language abilities led her to be assigned to the politics and society section rather than the home and family section, the topics typically assigned to female reporters at the time. Kamichika also produced her first literary journal, the Saffron (March–August 1914), during this time period.

=== Affair with Ōsugi Sakae ===
In 1914, Kamichika met anarchist Ōsugi Sakae. The two began their affair in the spring of 1915 and by December of that same year it was well-known and unpopular within their circles of fellow radical activists. Ōsugi was married at the time to Reiko and soon began another relationship with anarcho-feminist Itō Noe in 1916. Ōsugi stated to the three women that this unconventional relationship was an attempt to test his theory of free love, in which all sexual partners were to be allowed complete freedom in sexual matters. Ōsugi, however, soon began to favor Itō, straining the relationships between him and Kamichika, who had already attempted to break off the relationship immediately after Ōsugi had begun seeing Itō. This tension culminated on November 8, 1916, when Kamichika stabbed Ōsugi in an incident that was later called the Hayama Hikage Chaya scandal after the teahouse in Hayama, Kanagawa where the incident took place. She was sentenced to four years in prison on March 7, 1917, but after appealing her sentence she only served two. Kamichika served this sentence in what was essentially solitary confinement. In 1919, Kamichika was released from prison with a tarnished reputation and career. Her family refused to allow her to visit them due to the disgrace she had brought them. The scandal also had significant impacts on the broader socialist movement in Japan. Leaders in the socialist movement worried that the actions of Ōsugi and Kamichika would reflect poorly on the broader socialist movement, and cause mainstream media, which was already highly-critical of the socialist movement, to portray socialists as hypersexual. Thus several prominent socialists released statements decrying the affair and criticizing Ōsugi's behavior. Additionally, the scandal led to the end of the Bluestocking magazine.

=== After 1919 ===
After Kamichika was released from prison in 1919, she joined the editorial team of the Nyonin Geijutsu. She worked in various oppositional movements throughout the 1920s, working for Japan's first literary socialist journal The Sower (Tane maku Hito (種蒔く人). In 1920, she married Atsushi Suzuki and had three children. She and Suzuki later created the Fujin Bungei in 1934, a literary journal that featured women writers and questioned Japan's increasing nationalism just before World War II broke out.

== Post-war ==
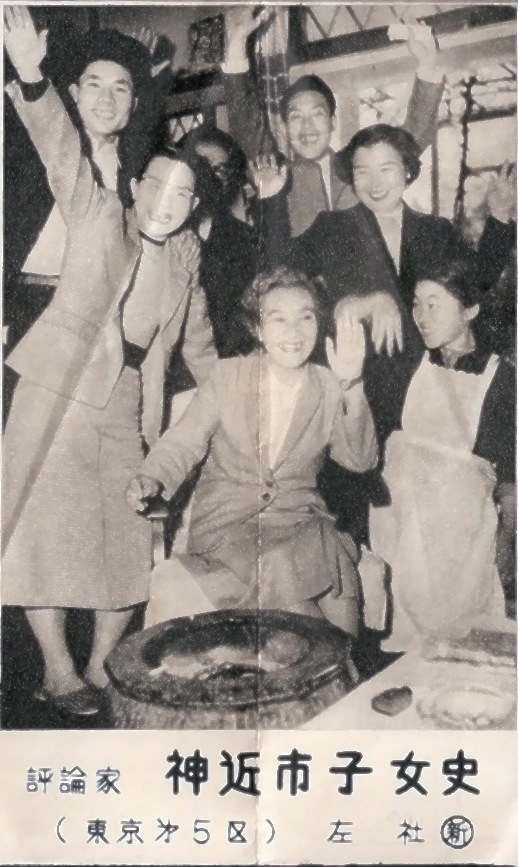
After winning the 1953 election (Kamichika Ichiko center)

In 1947, after the war ended, Kamichika became active in political organizations and ran for office. While she wasn't elected that year, she was elected to the House of Representatives during the 1953 Japanese general election, representing Tokyo's 5th district. She was a member of the Leftist Socialist Party of Japan, and following its merger, the Japan Socialist Party. She lost her seat during the 1960 election, but regained it during the next term. During her time in office, she was instrumental to the passage of the Prostitution Prevention Law. She was famously quoted stating that "we must punish the estimated five hundred thousand prostitutes to protect the lifestyle of forty million housewives." She retired in 1969.

In 1970, Kamichika tried to sue Yoshishige Yoshida for making a film called Eros + Massacre, which included a scene based on the Hayama Hikage Chaya incident. Instead, Yoshida changed the name of her character in the film to Masaoka Itsuko.

Kamichika died on August 1, 1981. She wrote and translated many books throughout her life.

== Selected bibliography ==
- Kamichika, Ichiko (1917). 引かれものの唄. 法木書店.
- Kamichika, Ichiko (1930). 現代婦人讀本 [A modern woman's reader]. 天人社.
- Kamichika, Ichiko (1933). 性問題の批判と解決. 東京書房.
- Kamichika, Ichiko (1948). 結婚について [On marriage]. 企画社.
- Kamichika, Ichiko (1951). 女性思想史 [The history of female thought]. 三元社.
- Kamichika, Ichiko (1972). 神近市子自伝 わが愛わが闘い [Autobiography of Ichiko Kamichika: my love and my battles]. Kodansha.
