= Keishichi Hirasawa =

Japanese labor activist and playwright (1889–1923)

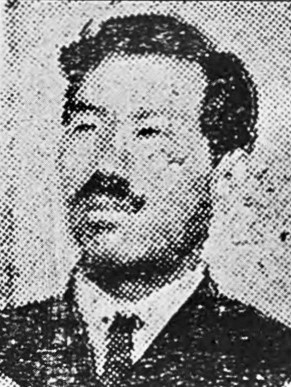
Photo of Hirasawa from an Asashi Shinbun article reporting the Kameido Incident, 12 October 1923

Keishichi Hirasawa (Japanese: 平澤 計七; 14 July 1889 – 3 September 1923) was a Japanese playwright and labor activist. He was a father of proletarian theater in Japan.

== Life ==
Hirasawa was born in Niigata Prefecture in 1899 and moved to Ōmiya as a child. After graduating from elementary school, he began working at a factory run by the Japan Railway Company. He commenced military service in 1910, and after completing his service moved to Ōjima, where he began working for the Tokyo Spring Company. He started writing for the journal of the Yūaikai, a trade union federation. He wrote speeches and plays expressing the federation's messaging.

In 1919, Hirasawa became the chairman of the Jōtō Federation, a federation of local unions in Nankatsu which sponsored a range of cultural and educational programs including an arts club, a legal aid service, and a debating society. It also negotiated with local employers. Hirasawa became known for his plays about life as a factory worker.

He was married to Matsu Hirasawa, the second daughter of Takejirō Mori (the adoptive father of Isojirō Mori, who was the father of Taikichirō Mori). Together they had a daughter named Ayako Hirasawa.

In the wake of the Great Kantō Earthquake, Hirasawa was abducted and executed alongside nine other labor activists by local police and military in Kameido.

== Bibliography ==
- (1919, reprinted 2003) 労働問題 (Rōdō mondai (Labor Issues))

Published posthumously:

- (1924) 一つの先駆 (Hitotsu no senku (A Pioneer)) - Manuscript collection
- (1926) 一人と千三百人 (Hitori to sen sanbyaku nin (One and 1,300 Men)) - Retitled reprint of Labor Issues
- (1955) 平澤計七集 (Hirasawa keishichi shū (Keishichi Hirasawa Collection)), Edited by Hideo Odagiri and Masaru Nishida
- (1977) 一人と千三百人 (Hitori to sen sanbyaku nin (One and 1,300 Men)), Edited by Masaru Nishida
- (2003) 平澤計七作品集 (Hirasawa keishichi shōhinshū (Keishichi Hirasawa Works Collection)), Edited by Shigeru Ōwada and Fujio Fujita
- (2020) 一人と千三百人／二人の中尉 (Hitori to sen sanbyaku nin / Futari no chūi (One and 1,300 Men / Two Lieutenants)) 平沢計七先駆作品集 (Hirasawa keishichi senku shōhinshū (Keishichi Hirasawa Pioneer Works Collection))

== See also ==
- Kameido incident
- September 1923 (film)

== Sources ==
- Gordon, Andrew (Jan 21, 1991). Labor and Imperial Democracy in Prewar Japan. University of California Press. ISBN 978-0-520-06783-7.
- Gordon, Andrew (1997). "Workers Movements in Late Meiji Tokyo". Bulletin de l'École française d'Extrême-Orient. 84 (1): 285–308. doi:10.3406/befeo.1997.2482.
- Karlsson, Mats (2014). "Proletarian Writers and the Great Tokyo Earthquake of 1923". In Starrs, Roy (ed.). When the Tsunami Came to Shore: Culture and Disaster in Japan. Leiden: Brill. ISBN 978-90-04-26829-6.
