= The Prison Memoirs of a Japanese Woman =

Book by Kaneko Fumiko

The Prison Memoirs of a Japanese Woman (何が私をこうさせたか, Nani ga watashi o kō saseta ka; literally "What Made Me This Way?", often translated as "What Made Me Do It?") is a book written by Kaneko Fumiko. Jean Inglis translated the book into English, in a translation published in 1991 by M.E. Sharpe. Mikiso Hane wrote the introduction to the English version.

== Background ==
When the preliminary hearing of Kaneko's trial occurred, the judge asked Kaneko to, in order for him to understand why she committed the crime, write about her life.

Kaneko had a draft version of the document, then made changes. According to Conrad Totman of Yale University, the judge may have read it between edits. A finalized version was later published. This is the surviving work by Kaneko with the most length.

According to Patricia G. Steinhoff of the University of Hawaii, Kaneko's association with Pak Yol, who, according to Steinhoff, is relatively obscure, and the relative lack of surviving documents from Kaneko makes it more difficult to write a biography of Kaneko.

A portion of the work was previously published in Hane's Reflections on the Way to the Gallows.

== Reception ==
Steinhoff described the translation and adaptation as "an important service". Steinhoff praised the "straightforward, clear prose" from a young author with a difficult background, and stated that the English translation had successfully mirrored that prose. Steinhoff added that the book "reads like a polished work of fiction."
