= Ōmi Komaki =

- Born: 11 May 1894; Akita prefecture, Japan
- Died: 29 October 1978 (aged 84); Kamakura, Japan
- Occupations: writer and translator
- Writing career
- Genres: translations of French literature, essays, poetry
- Literary movement: Proletarian literature Movement.

Ōmi Komaki (小牧 近江, Komaki Ōmi; 11 May 1894 – 29 October 1978) was the pen-name of a scholar and translator of French literature in Taishō and Shōwa period Japan. His real name was Komaki Ōmiya.

== Early life ==
Komaki was born in Tsuchizaki-Minato town, Akita prefecture, as the son of a politician. He dropped out of middle school in order to accompany his father to an international conference of legislators in France, and stayed on, working his way through the Law Department of Paris University. He was greatly influenced by the philosophy of Romain Rolland and the Clarté ("Clarity") movement of the French novelist, Henri Barbusse, which encouraged him to participate in pacifist activities.

== Literary career ==
Komaki returned to Japan in 1919 and founded the literary magazine Tane Maku Hito ("The Sowers") in October 1921, named after the famous painting by the French artist Jean-François Millet. He used this as his platform to promote his pacifist and Marxist ideals through poems and essays, many of which he wrote. He was one of the first Japanese members of Comintern, and a pioneer in the Proletarian literature movement. The movement attracted the attention of Arishima Takeo, and other noted leftist writers. In 1924 another literary magazine Bungei Sensen ("Literary Battlefront") spun out from the original Tane Maku Hito group.

When Komaki had spare time from promoting communist revolution and avoiding the thought police, he worked at translating works of French literature into Japanese. His most noted works are translations of Charles-Louis Philippe's Dans la Petite Ville and André Gide's biography, Charles-Louis Philippe.

After World War II, Komaki became a professor at Hosei University, and continued to pursue his pacifist and Marxist philosophies.

His works include Ikoku no Senso (Other Countries’ Wars) and Furansu Kakumei Yobanashi (Evening Conversations on the French Revolution).

Komaki relocated from Tokyo to Kamakura, Kanagawa prefecture in 1925. He later spent some years in French Indochina, but returned after World War II to Kamakura, where he lived until his death in 1978 at the age of 84.

== See also ==
- Japanese literature
- List of Japanese authors
