= Sugako =

- Gender: Female

Origin
- Origin: Japanese
- Meaning: Different meanings depending on the kanji used

Sugako (written: 壽賀子 or 須賀子) is a feminine Japanese given name. Notable people with the name include:

- Sugako Hashida (橋田 壽賀子; 1925–2021), Japanese screenwriter
- Kanno Sugako (管野 須賀子; 1881–1911), Japanese anarchist and journalist
