= Reflections on the Way to the Gallows =

Reflections on the Way to the Gallows: Rebel Women in Prewar Japan is a collection of writings, translated into English and edited by Mikiso Hane. It was published by the University of California Press/Pantheon Books in 1988. Hane also wrote an introduction.

The title is taken from that of Kanno Sugako's diary, Shide no Michigusa (死出の道艸).

The book discusses thirteen women in the period after the Meiji Revolution, and prior to the end of World War II, who rebelled against the societal status quo and had taken leftist positions. They include Fukuda Hideko, Kaneko Fumiko, Kanno Sugako, and Yamashiro Tomoe. The authorities prosecuted and imprisoned these women; two of the women were given death sentences, and one such sentence was carried out. Barbara Molony of Santa Clara University stated that these women were, in 1989, not well known to scholars from Western countries who studied Japan. According to Joyce C. Lebra of the University of Colorado at Boulder, it is the first such substantial translation of works in this genre.

== Contents ==
The materials include criminal justice documents, self-written biographies, works of fiction related to their lives, interview records, and diaries.

The introduction is Chapter 1. Fukuda Hideko, Kanno Sugako, and Kaneko Fumiko are documented in chapters 2, 3, and 4, respectively. The chapter on Fukuda Hideko includes portions of her autobiography. Sekirankai ("Red Wave Society") is documented in chapter 5. "From the Factories and Rice Paddies," about rural activists and factory workers, is chapter 6. "The World of Stars," chapter 7, discusses Fuki no To ("Big Rhubarb Shoots") by Yamashiro Tomoe.

== Reception ==
Elizabeth Hanson of The New York Times praised the introduction and stated that the translation work was done "smoothly".

Lebra described the title as "dramatic". She praised the "superb translation", as well as the "remarkable voices" of the subjects.

Ronald Loftus of Willamette University praised the "powerful voices" of the subjects documented by the book.

Molony stated that the women chronicled in the book had "eloquent yet matter-of-fact voices". Molony argued that the introduction should have had been "expanded", and she criticized the title because almost all of the chronicled women were not put to death; Molony characterized her own criticisms as "minor".

Martha C. Tocco, a reviewer in Tokyo, characterized the title as "more evocative than accurate" as almost all of the chronicled women were not put to death. Tocco also argued that the way the work portrayed "increasing victimization" of women in the country was "oversimplification". Overall, Tocco felt that the work made a strong "contribution" in the field, and concluded that the book is "a kaleidoscopic picture of political activism that ties people to events and politics to personal life."
