= Ōsugi Sakae =

Japanese anarchist (1885–1923)

- 大杉 栄
- Ōsugi in 1922
- Born: 17 January 1885; Marugame, Japan
- Died: 16 September 1923 (aged 38); Tokyo, Japan
- Cause of death: Murder by strangulation
- Occupations: Anarchist writer, social critic, translator
- Movement: Anarchism in Japan, Anarcho-syndicalism
- Spouse: Hori Yasuko (m. 1906; div. 1917)
- Partner(s): Itō Noe (1916–1923); Kamichika Ichiko (1915–1916)

Ōsugi Sakae (Japanese: 大杉 栄; 17 January 1885 – 16 September 1923) was a Japanese anarchist writer and social critic of the Taishō period. His thought centered on individualism, direct action, and the "expansion of the ego" as philosophical underpinnings for social and personal revolution.

Born into a military family, Ōsugi was expelled from military school for insubordination and turned to language studies and radical politics in Tokyo. After a series of prison terms between 1906 and 1910, which he considered his "real education," he emerged as a leading voice in the Japanese anarchist movement. Through his journals, such as Kindai shisō (Modern Thought) and Rōdō undō (The Labor Movement), he introduced the works of European thinkers like Peter Kropotkin, Georges Sorel, and Henri Bergson to Japan, synthesizing their ideas into his own philosophy. His advocacy of free love and his controversial personal life, which included simultaneous relationships with three women, led to a violent attack against him in 1916 and his temporary ostracism from the socialist movement.

Ōsugi became a key figure in the Japanese labor movement, advocating for syndicalism and workers' autonomy while strongly criticizing both state authority and the emerging Bolshevism. In the chaotic aftermath of the 1923 Great Kantō earthquake, Ōsugi, his partner and fellow anarchist Itō Noe, and his six-year-old nephew were arrested by a squad of military police led by Captain Amakasu Masahiko. They were beaten and strangled, their bodies disposed of in a well. Their murders, known as the Amakasu Incident, became a symbol of state violence against radicals during the period.

== Early life and education ==
Ōsugi Sakae was born on 17 January 1885 in Marugame, Kagawa Prefecture. His father, Ōsugi Azuma, was a captain in the Imperial Japanese Army, and the family moved frequently, settling in Shibata, Niigata Prefecture, in 1889. The Ōsugi family had a military tradition, but by the time of Sakae's birth, its fortunes had declined. His maternal uncle, Yamada Hōei, was a lieutenant general who served as an early role model. Ōsugi's father was often absent and unaffectionate, while his mother, Yutaka, was a strong-willed and central figure in his childhood. Their relationship was competitive and marked by frequent clashes of will, a dynamic that shaped Ōsugi's later approach to authority. As a child, he was known for being unruly, frequently engaging in fights, and leading a gang of local children. He also developed a stutter, a trait he shared with his father and paternal uncles.

=== Military school and expulsion ===
Inspired by his uncle's success, Ōsugi decided on a military career. After failing his first attempt, he passed the entrance exams in 1899 and entered the Nagoya Kadet School, a preparatory institution for the army. Life at the school was rigidly disciplined. While Ōsugi excelled in sports and academics, his rebellious nature brought him into constant conflict with his superiors. His tenure was marked by disciplinary infractions, including an incident implied to be of a homosexual nature, which resulted in a sentence of thirty days' confinement to the school.

His military career ended abruptly in November 1901. After engaging in a knife fight with a fellow cadet, Ōsugi was seriously wounded and hospitalized. His father was summoned to withdraw him from the school, but before this could be finalized, the school ordered his official expulsion. The disgrace of being rejected by the military world that defined his family and social environment precipitated a mental breakdown. After a period of silent withdrawal, he was persuaded by his father and a family friend to pursue a new career path. He moved to Tokyo in January 1902 to study languages, with the goal of eventually re-entering military circles as an instructor.

== Turn to socialism ==
In Tokyo, Ōsugi experienced a newfound freedom from the strict discipline of his youth. He enrolled in several schools, including the Junten Middle School, which he entered in October 1902 after his mother's death in June. During this period, his intellectual horizons expanded significantly. He was deeply influenced by Oka Asajirō's Shinka ron kōwa (Discourse on Evolution), which he later said "cried out for the reformation of various social systems" and made it easy to accept socialist ideas. He also explored Christianity, attending the church of Ebina Danjō, attracted by its perceived libertarianism and cosmopolitanism.

A more decisive influence was the liberal newspaper Yorozu chōhō, which he began reading in 1902. Through its pages, he became acquainted with the writings and ideas of early Japanese socialists and pacifists, including Kōtoku Shūsui, Sakai Toshihiko, and Uchimura Kanzō. When Kōtoku and Sakai resigned from the newspaper over its pro-war stance at the outset of the Russo-Japanese War and formed the Heimin-sha (Commoners' Society) in November 1903, Ōsugi soon began attending their meetings. At his first meeting, he declared: "I was born into an army family...because I feel most deeply the falsehoods and stupidity of army life, I want to devote my life to socialism." The war also caused his final break with Ebina Danjō's church, whose patriotic fervor he found contrary to his understanding of Christian universalism.

While attending the Tokyo Foreign Language School (now the Tokyo University of Foreign Studies), Ōsugi continued to associate with the Heimin-sha. His formal entry into the socialist movement became permanent on 15 March 1906, when he was arrested for participating in a protest against a trolley fare increase in Tokyo. The arrest ended any possibility of a career in the army or government and forced him into the life of a full-time radical.

== Imprisonment and intellectual development ==
Between 1906 and 1910, Ōsugi spent over three years in prison on various charges. Following his initial arrest for the trolley fare riot, he was imprisoned for violating press laws with two articles published in late 1906 and early 1907. Two more significant incidents led to longer sentences. In January 1908, he was arrested for haranguing passersby from a rooftop after police halted a socialist meeting (the Rooftop Incident). In June 1908, he was arrested again during the Red Flag Incident, a public clash between anarchists and police, which brought him his heaviest sentence of two and a half years in Chiba Prison. Paradoxically, this imprisonment likely saved his life, as it kept him incarcerated during the crackdown that led to the High Treason Incident of 1910–1911, in which Kōtoku Shūsui and other leading anarchists were executed.

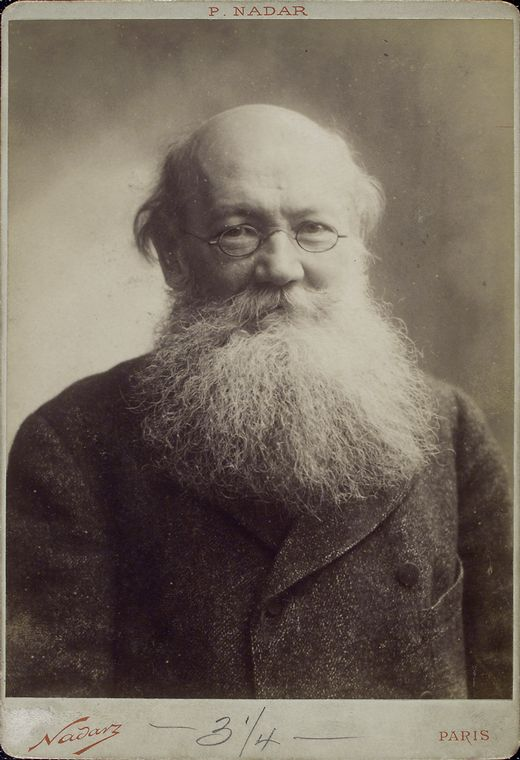
Peter Kropotkin

Ōsugi later referred to prison as his "university," where he undertook a rigorous program of self-education. He systematically studied several languages, including Esperanto, Italian, Russian, and German, in addition to the French he had already learned. His primary focus, however, was on radical thought. He read widely in science, philosophy, and sociology, and was particularly drawn to the works of anarchist writers. He encountered the writings of Mikhail Bakunin, Errico Malatesta, and especially Peter Kropotkin. Kropotkin's theory of mutual aid, which presented cooperation as a factor in evolution, appealed to Ōsugi's scientific inclinations and became a cornerstone of his thought, providing an alternative to the competitive model of Social Darwinism. The harsh conditions of prison life—poor food, cold, and illness that left him with lifelong tuberculosis—also gave him a profound awareness of physical suffering and mortality. He was released in November 1910, a highly educated and committed anarchist, into the so-called "winter period" (fuyu no jidai), when open socialist activity had been crushed by the government.

== Anarchist activism and theory ==
After his release, Ōsugi struggled financially, contributing translations to Sakai Toshihiko's Baibunsha (Purveying Literature Company), a venture created to support unemployed socialists. Impatient with the cautious mood of the "winter period," he and Arahata Kanson founded the journal Kindai shisō (Modern Thought) in October 1912 to rekindle radical debate.

Ōsugi's anarchism was an eclectic blend of European ideas synthesized into a philosophy centered on the absolute freedom of the individual. His thought drew from several key sources:

- Peter Kropotkin: Provided a scientific and collectivist foundation through his theory of mutual aid.
- Georges Sorel: Contributed the concepts of revolutionary violence (as a creative force of the oppressed, distinct from the repressive force of the state), the importance of myth, and an anti-rationalist focus on direct action.
- Henri Bergson: Provided the metaphysical concept of élan vital (vital impulse), which Ōsugi adapted into his core theory of the "expansion of life" (sei no kakujū).
- Max Stirner and Friedrich Nietzsche: Reinforced his radical individualism and focus on the will and the ego.

In a series of three articles published in 1913–1914, Ōsugi articulated his central theory of the "expansion of life." He argued that life, which he equated with the individual ego, was a form of energy that must constantly expand. All social and moral systems that constrained this expansion—government, laws, religion, traditional family structures—were obstacles that had to be destroyed. True freedom and creativity arose from this struggle, in which the individual asserts their will against a hostile environment. This philosophy sought to bridge the gap between individualism and social revolution, arguing that the liberation of each ego would naturally lead to a new, free society.

== Personal life and "free love" scandal ==
In 1906, Ōsugi married Hori Yasuko. He soon began writing about free love, arguing that monogamous marriage under capitalism was a form of property relation that constrained freedom and perverted genuine emotion. He called for a society where relationships would be based on free agreement, emotional and economic independence, and the right to divorce easily.

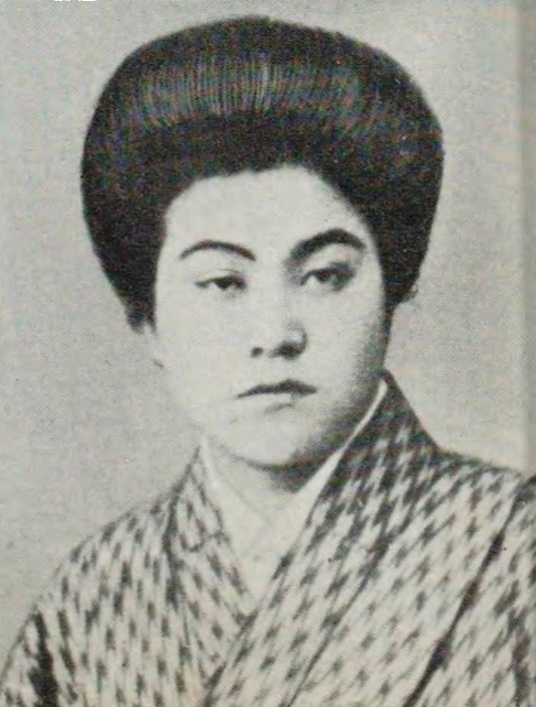
Kamichika Ichiko

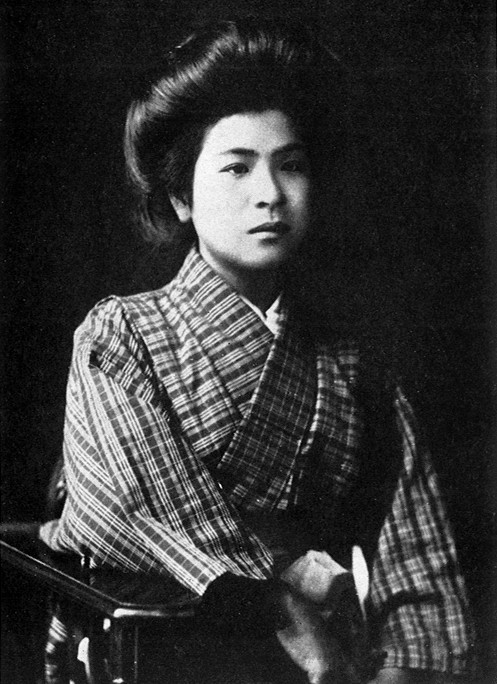
Itō Noe

Beginning in late 1915, he put this theory into practice by pursuing simultaneous relationships with his wife Hori, the journalist Kamichika Ichiko, and the feminist-anarchist Itō Noe. He proposed a triangular relationship based on three rules: economic independence for all partners, maintaining separate residences, and complete freedom of action, including sexually. The arrangement was fraught with emotional and financial turmoil. Hori refused to accept the theory, while Itō tried to accommodate it and Kamichika felt increasingly neglected as Ōsugi's affection shifted toward Itō.

The affair culminated in violence on the night of 8 November 1916. At an inn in Hayama, following a tense and complicated series of encounters involving all three, Kamichika attacked a sleeping Ōsugi with a short sword, stabbing him in the throat. He survived, but the incident became a major public scandal. Ōsugi was widely condemned, not only by the general public but also by his comrades in the socialist movement, who felt his actions had brought disrepute upon their cause. Kamichika was sentenced to two years in prison. Hori divorced Ōsugi, who was then ostracized by the movement and left in personal and professional isolation. He remained with Itō Noe, who became his partner until their deaths.

== Labor movement and syndicalism ==
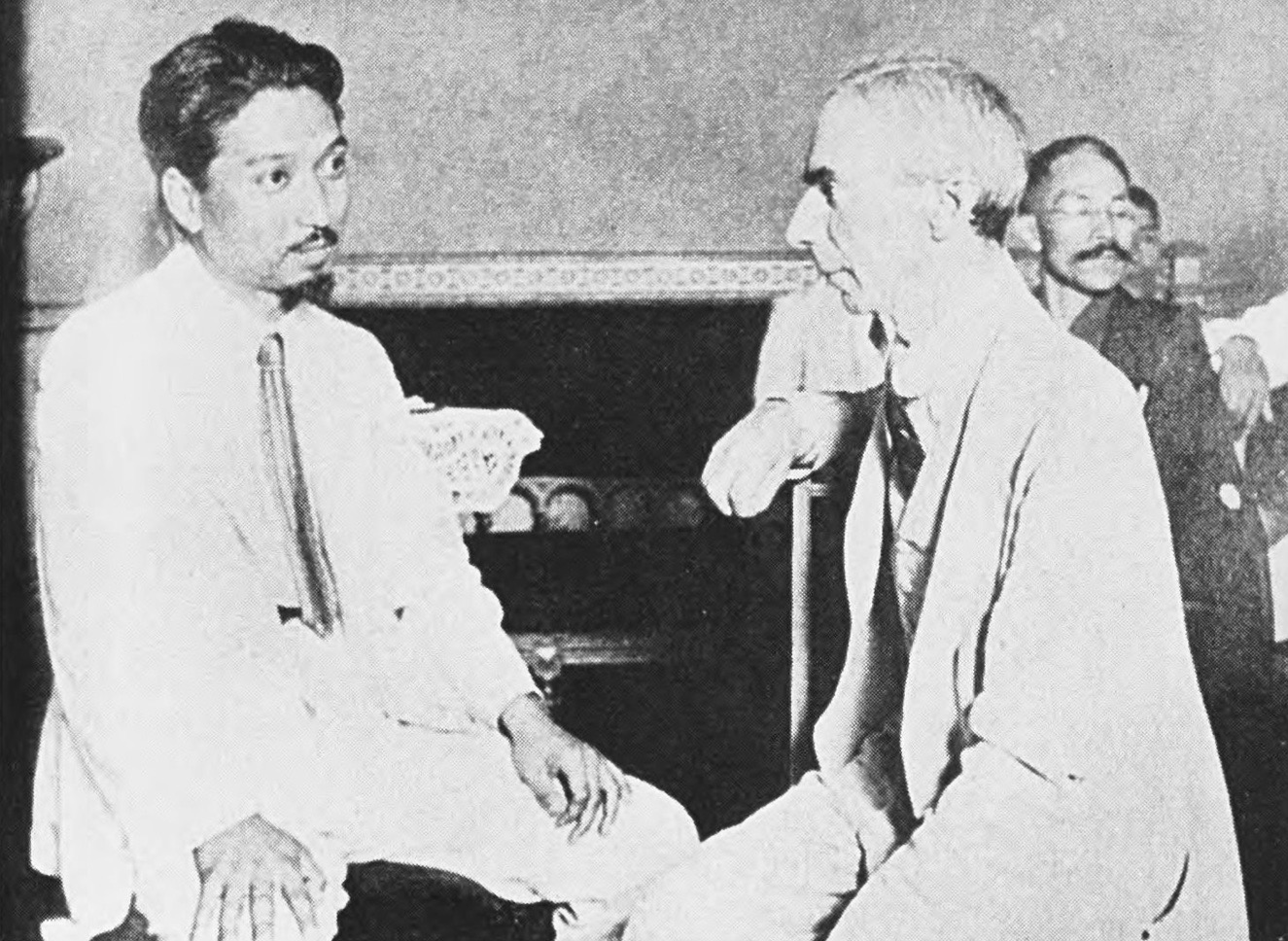
Ōsugi with Bertrand Russell during the latter's visit to Japan, 1921

After his personal scandal forced him into temporary isolation in 1917, Ōsugi shifted his focus to the labor movement, seeking to put his theories into practice. He moved to a working-class district of Tokyo and became deeply involved in organizing workers. He was instrumental in forming several syndicalist unions, including the Shin'yūkai (Sincere Friends' Society) and the Seishinkai (Righteously Advancing Society).

Consistent with his anti-authoritarianism, Ōsugi was highly critical of intellectuals (including himself) who sought to lead the working class. He argued that revolutionary ideas and initiatives must emerge spontaneously from the workers themselves, based on their own experiences and desires. He advocated a tactic of disrupting meetings of moderate or conservative unions by heckling speakers, viewing this not as mere disruption but as a form of direct action that broke down hierarchical structures and forced a genuine dialogue. He saw unions (syndicates) as microcosms of a future anarchist society, where workers could practice autonomy and self-governance.

=== Anarchism versus Bolshevism ===
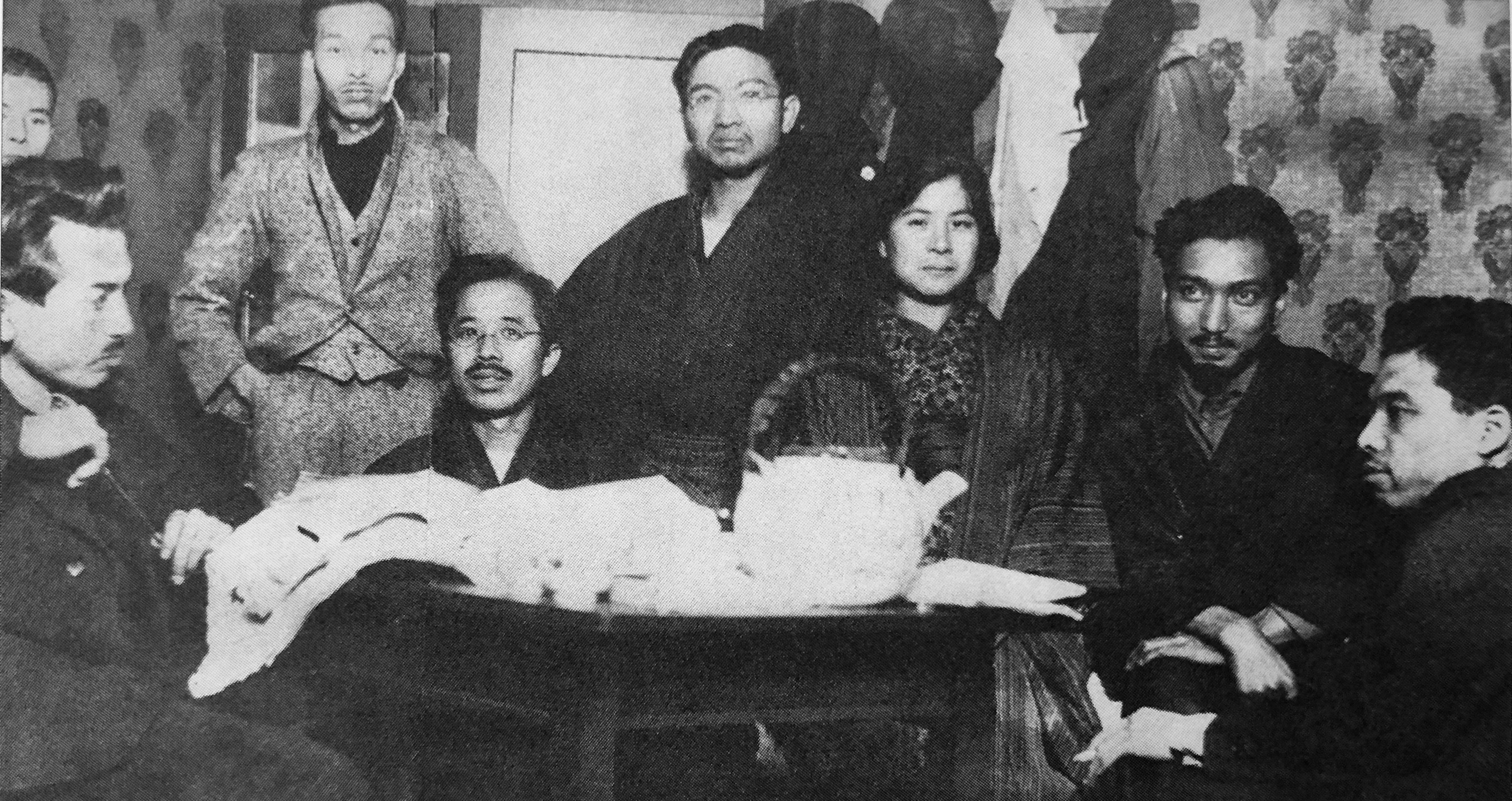
Ōsugi (second from right) with Itō and other radicals, 1921

Ōsugi initially welcomed the Russian Revolution of 1917, celebrating its spontaneity. In the spirit of a united revolutionary front, he briefly attempted to cooperate with the emerging pro-Bolshevik faction in Japan. In October 1920, he traveled to Shanghai to meet with Comintern agents and accepted ¥2,000 to fund a new journal, the second Rōdō undō, which he launched with both anarchists and Bolsheviks on its staff in January 1921. However, cooperation soon broke down due to personal animosities and ideological differences. Ōsugi grew suspicious that the Bolsheviks were trying to oust him and seize control of the movement. More fundamentally, as he learned more about the Bolsheviks' suppression of the Kronstadt rebellion and their persecution of Russian anarchists like Nestor Makhno, his views hardened. He saw their dictatorship of the proletariat and highly centralized, authoritarian state as a betrayal of the revolution's libertarian promise and a violation of his core principles of autonomy and freedom.

The definitive break came at a conference in Osaka in September 1922, which was intended to form a nationwide labor federation. The meeting collapsed amid the fierce dispute between Ōsugi's anarchist faction, which advocated a decentralized federation based on free association, and the Bolshevik faction, which demanded a centralized, disciplined organization. This event, known as the "anarchist-Bolshevik split" (ana-boru ronsō), solidified Ōsugi's position as Japan's leading critic of Bolshevism.

== Journey to Europe ==
In November 1922, Ōsugi received an invitation to an international anarchist congress in Berlin. Evading police surveillance, he departed secretly in December, traveling to Shanghai where he obtained a false Chinese passport under the name T'ang Chi. He arrived in Marseille, France, in February 1923. He spent several months in Lyons and Paris, where he was unable to obtain the required identity card and lived as an illegal alien. He was shocked by the poverty he witnessed, which he attributed to the effects of World War I. He spent his time collecting materials on the Makhnovist movement and meeting with Russian émigrés.

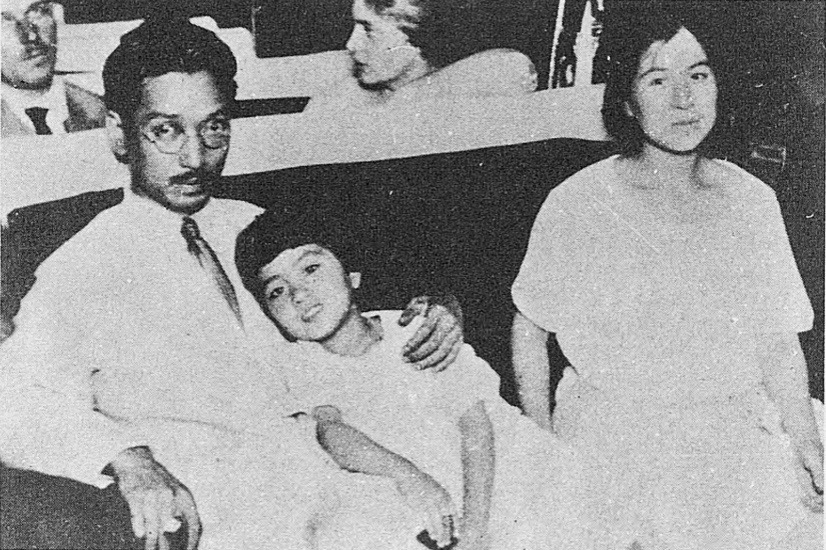
Ōsugi with Itō and their daughter Mako after his return to Japan, July 1923

He never reached the Berlin congress. On 1 May 1923, he attended a May Day rally in Saint-Denis, a suburb of Paris. After giving a speech in which he urged the workers to more radical action, he was arrested by plain-clothes police. Identified as Ōsugi Sakae, likely through information from the Japanese embassy, he was charged with violating passport laws and sentenced to deportation. He was put on a ship from Marseille on 2 June and arrived back in Japan on 11 July. In the short time before his death, his main serious writing was a long article on Makhno, reaffirming his commitment to anarchism.

== Death ==
On 1 September 1923, the Great Kantō earthquake devastated Tokyo and the surrounding region. The ensuing chaos led to a complete breakdown of civil order. In the climate of fear and paranoia, the government declared martial law, and vigilante groups, incited by false rumors, murdered thousands of ethnic Koreans. The authorities also used the confusion to round up radicals and labor leaders.

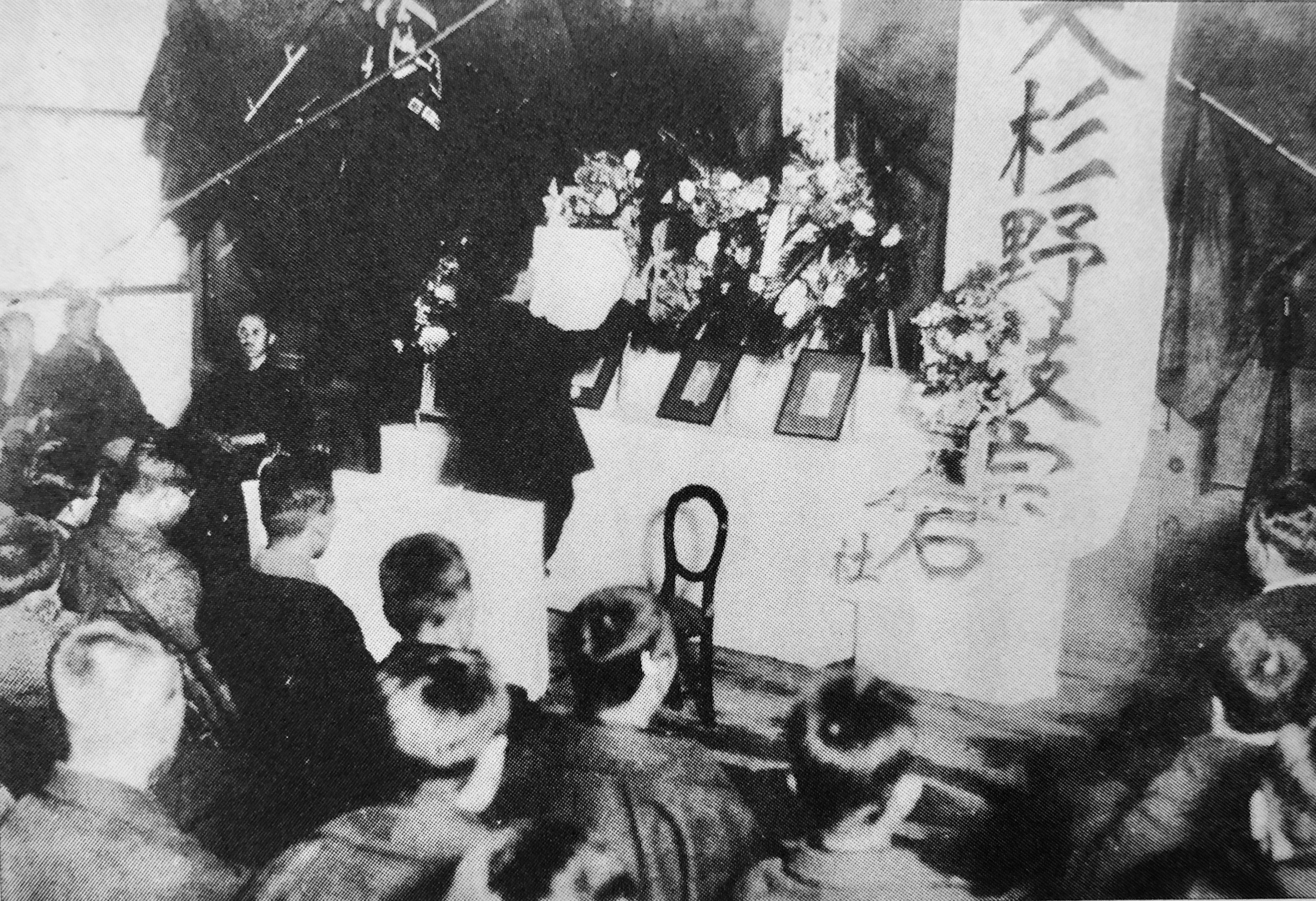
Funeral of Ōsugi, Itō, and Tachibana in December 1923

On 16 September, Ōsugi, Itō Noe, and Ōsugi's six-year-old nephew, Tachibana Munekazu, who was visiting from Oregon, were arrested by a squad of Kempeitai (military police) under the command of Captain Amakasu Masahiko. The three were taken to the Kempeitai headquarters, where they were beaten and then strangled to death. Their bodies were thrown into an abandoned well. The murders, which came to be known as the Amakasu Incident, were soon exposed. Amakasu was court-martialed and sentenced to ten years in prison but was released after only three years. The killing of Ōsugi, a well-known radical, was an extrajudicial murder carried out by a rogue military faction, distinct from the state-sanctioned legal process that had led to the execution of Kōtoku Shūsui a decade earlier.

== Legacy ==
Ōsugi Sakae remains a symbol of the radical individualism and anti-authoritarian spirit of the Taishō period. While his influence on the mainstream socialist movement was curtailed by his early death and the eventual triumph of Bolshevism, his life and work represent a unique strand of Japanese modern thought that rejected both traditional values and Western-style materialism. His philosophy of the "expansion of the ego" was a radical departure from the Japanese tradition of self-abnegation and duty, offering instead an ethos of personal liberation and self-creation.

His critique of the state and his early opposition to the authoritarian tendencies of Bolshevism were prescient. According to his biographer Thomas Stanley, Ōsugi's insistence that intellectuals should follow, not lead, the masses, contributed to a crisis of confidence among the Japanese intelligentsia. He remains a charismatic and controversial figure, whose life exemplified his belief that action, struggle, and the assertion of the individual will were the ultimate aims of a free life.
