= Masahiko Amakasu =

Japanese Army officer (1891–1945)

- 甘粕 正彦
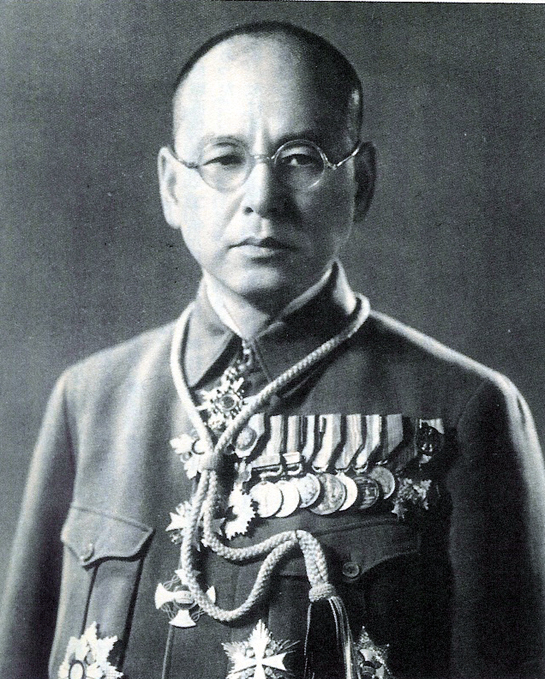
- Born: January 26, 1891; Miyagi Prefecture, Empire of Japan
- Died: August 20, 1945 (aged 54); Xinjing, Manchukuo
- Cause of death: Suicide by cyanide poisoning
- Occupations: Military officer, head of Manchukuo Film Association
- Known for: Amakasu incident
- Status: Deceased
- Conviction: Murder (3 counts)
- Penalty: 10 years imprisonment with hard labour; commuted to 7.5 years imprisonment with hard labour

Masahiko Amakasu (甘粕 正彦, Amakasu Masahiko; January 26, 1891 – August 20, 1945) was an officer in the Imperial Japanese Army who was imprisoned for his involvement in the Amakasu Incident, the extrajudicial execution of anarchists after the 1923 Great Kantō earthquake. He later became head of the Manchukuo Film Association.

== Biography ==
Amakasu was born in Miyagi Prefecture as the eldest son of a samurai of the Yonezawa Domain under the bakufu. The caste system in Japan where society was divided into merchants, artisans, peasants and samurai was abolished in 1871 as one of the Meiji era reforms, but long afterwards, caste distinctions persisted with those of the samurai caste being disproportionately over-represented in the officer corps of the Imperial Navy and Army right up to 1945. Amakasu was educated in military boarding schools in Mie Prefecture and Nagoya, and entered the Imperial Japanese Army Academy in 1912. After graduation, he served in the infantry and then the military police in various postings in Japan and in Korea.

On September 16, 1923, when Amakasu was a lieutenant in charge of a detachment of the Kenpeitai military police during the chaos immediately following the 1923 Great Kantō earthquake of September 1, he and his officers arrested the well-known anarchists Sakae Ōsugi and Noe Itō, along with Sakae's six-year-old nephew, Munekazu Tachibana. In what came to be known as the Amakasu Incident, the suspects were beaten to death and their bodies thrown into a well. The killing of such high-profile anarchists, along with a young child, sparked surprise and outrage throughout Japan. Nevertheless, thousands signed petitions requesting leniency on Amakasu's behalf. The murders also drew attention in the United States, since Munekazu Tachibana was a dual-national with American citizenship, having been born in Portland, Oregon. Efforts to get the American Embassy involved were unsuccessful. One embassy official made a brief statement on the case.

"In the case, even, of an unquestioned American citizen involved in trial in a foreign court, the law of that country must take its course, and we can only be interested in seeing that the trial is fair and the law impartially applied."

Amakasu and four other Imperial Japanese Army soldiers were court-martialed for the murders. During the trial, Amakasu's lawyers tied the murder to soldierly duties, and the ideals of spontaneity, sincerity, and pure motives. They argued that Sakae and Noe were traitors, and Amakasu killed them out of an irresistible urge to protect the country. As for the murder of the child, they argued that this was still justifiable for the public good. Many in the courtroom sympathized with these arguments, with spectators loudly calling Amakasu a "kokushi" (hero). The judge did nothing to intervene. Even the military prosecutor, while unwilling to accept the defense's arguments as an excuse, was sympathetic. Believing that Amakasu had merely acted excessively, he said the officer's patriotism "brought tears into one's eyes". As such, he demanded only 15 years in prison with hard labour for Amakasu, and lesser punishments for the other defendants.

The judge was even more lenient. Amakasu was sentenced to ten years in prison with hard labour, and IJA sergeant Keijiro Mori was sentenced to three years in prison with hard labour as an accomplice. The other three men were acquitted, two on the grounds of obeying superior orders, and the other due to insufficient evidence. In August 1924, Amakasu's sentence was reduced to 7 years and six months. However, he was released from prison in October 1926, due to a general amnesty proclaimed in celebration of the ascension of Hirohito as Emperor of Japan.

After his release, Amakasu was sent to France to study by the Japanese Army from July 1927. While in France, he became acquainted with the noted artist Tsuguharu Foujita. He returned to Japan in 1930, but almost immediately relocated to Mukden in Manchuria, where he worked under Japanese spymaster Kenji Doihara to manage the Japanese Army's increasing involvement in opium production and smuggling into China. After the Manchurian Incident, he relocated to Harbin, where he was involved in the effort to smuggle ex-Qing emperor Puyi from the foreign concession in Tianjin into Manchuria, where he would become the figurehead of the new state of Manchukuo. When Puyi landed in Port Arthur in November 1931, it was Amakasu who greeted him at the dock and escorted him to the train that took him to the Yamato Hotel. In Manchukuo, Amakasu served briefly as chief of police and helped establish the civilian police force in the new capital of Xinjing, as the city of Changchun had been renamed. During his time in Manchukuo, Amakasu was notorious for his brutality, and the American historian Louise Young described Amakasu as a "sadistic" man who enjoyed torturing and killing people. After the Marco Polo Bridge Incident in 1937, which marked the beginning of the war with China, Amakasu played a prominent role in undercover operations against China.

In 1939, with the support of Nobusuke Kishi, he was named the head of Manchukuo Film Association, which was one of the main propaganda vehicles for the Kwantung Army to boost public support for Manchukuo and for the war effort against the Kuomintang government of China. Amakasu strove hard to improve the quality of the works produced, traveling to Germany to acquire the latest movie cameras and production techniques, and inviting noted Japanese movie stars, directors and conductors (such as Takashi Asahina) to visit Manchukuo and to participate in his productions. His efforts were instrumental in launching the career of Yoshiko Yamaguchi.

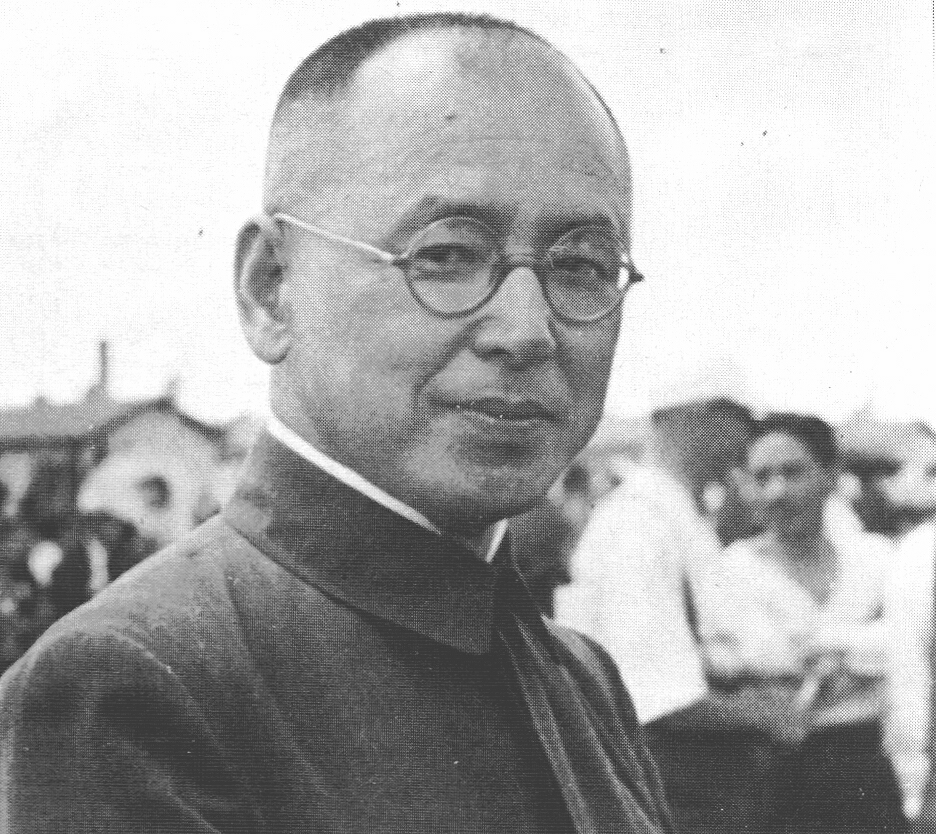
Amakasu in Manchukuo, 1940

In 1940, Amakasu produced Shina no yoru (支那の夜, "China Nights"), which became the most popular Japanese film of that year. The film told the story of a romance between a Chinese woman and a Japanese merchant navy officer. Eri Hotta argued that Amakasu projected a Pan-Asian message in the film, with its Chinese heroine marrying the Japanese hero, and moreover, it is clear that the Japanese hero is the dominant partner in their relationship, which was meant as a metaphor for the relationship Amakasu wanted to see between Japan and China.

With the fall of Manchukuo to Soviet forces during the invasion of Manchuria in August 1945, Amakasu committed suicide by taking potassium cyanide. On the last day of his life, he wrote out a suicide note in his office and swallowed a cyanide pill.

== In popular culture ==
- Amakasu was portrayed by Japanese musician Ryuichi Sakamoto in the 1987 film The Last Emperor, although he was shown shooting himself to death in the movie.
- Amakasu is also a character in the historical fantasy novel Teito Monogatari by Hiroshi Aramata. In the novel, he is involved with the freemasons.
- Amakasu was featured as a character in Ian Buruma's novel The China Lover, released in 2008.
- Amakasu is a main character in Christian Kracht's 2016 novel The Dead.

== See also ==
- Amakasu Incident
- Manchukuo Film Association
