= Mikiso Hane =

Japanese-American historian

- Born: January 16, 1922; Hollister, California, U.S.
- Died: December 8, 2003 (aged 81); Peoria, Illinois, U.S.
- Education: Ph.D. 1957, Yale University
- Occupation: Szold Distinguished Service Professor of History at Knox College
- Years active: 1961–2003

Mikiso “Miki” Hane (January 16, 1922 – December 8, 2003) was a Japanese American professor of history at Knox College, where he taught for over 40 years. He wrote and translated over a dozen books, wrote many articles, and was appointed a member of the National Council on the Humanities in 1991. He was born in California, lived in Japan during his teenage years, and was interned in Arizona during World War II. He taught soldiers Japanese at Yale, then studied there, where he attained a bachelors degree in 1952, a masters degree in 1953, and doctorate degree in 1957. He studied in Japan and Germany, then taught at the University of Toledo and studied in India before going to Knox College in 1961. He lived in Galesburg for the rest of his life, and both wrote and taught until his death.

== Early life and education ==
Hane was born in Hollister, California on January 16, 1922. While in Hollister, his family worked as tenant farmers. He had three brothers and two sisters. Hane attended Fairhaven Grammar School, a two-room elementary school in Hollister, California, during the 1930s, where he learned basic American history. He later likened this history, which mostly concerned topics such as George Washington's cherry tree and Columbus’ discovery of America, to both myth and the “great man” theory of Thomas Carlyle.

At 10, in 1933, he was sent to Japan by his family, where he lived in a ‘small peasant village’ near Hiroshima with his uncle. His parents sent Hane back with the hope to join him later after their retirement. He worked as a vegetable farmer to provide for the family. Hane discussed his early life experience of living in poverty to the Journal Star, describing “the sense that you can’t look forward.” In school, he continued to learn myths “designed to indoctrinate the youngsters,” this time about the history of Japan, including topics such as the founding of Japan by the Sun Goddess and the daring heroics of General Nogi. Despite this “‘theological’ view of history,” his stern teacher motivated Hane’s interest in history. Hane reports that he was kicked out of this school after he organized the other students into purposefully dragging out a game of tug-o-war to annoy the widely disliked physical education teacher. He was only allowed to return after his aunt and uncle begged the principal “on their hands and knees” to forgive him. Later, after Japan invaded China, Hane was worried that Japan might go to war with the United States, and so he asked his parents if they would let him return before such a war began. He returned to Hollister in 1940 and a teacher at the elementary school there tutored him in English.

=== Internment during WWII ===
After the Japanese attack on Pearl Harbor and Executive Order 9066 was signed, Hane was forced to live in internment camps along with 120,000 Japanese-Americans. He shared in an interview with Quad-City Times that he was “frightened” he would be punished “for the crimes of my race”. He recalled many rumors surrounding what would be done to the people in the internment camp: “... they were going to put us on trains, take us to camps and machine gun us down … We didn’t know what to do. Two Japanese-American girls in a neighboring community were taken away and raped.” Hane said that he burnt all letters, books, and other documents he possessed written in Japanese for fear of being arrested. This was 6 months before his family was ordered to report to a government detention camp in Poston, Arizona, in the hot Sonoran desert, in May 1942. They, along with 20,000 other Japanese in this camp, lived in old Army barracks stationed in the desert battered by sandstorms. If they did not profess loyalty to the United States, they would be sent to a “high-pressure concentration camp” in Tule Lake, California. According to Hane, the worst part of his own experience was a lack of privacy. Hane took the job as a dishwasher in the camp's kitchen and received $16 per month. Despite the difficult conditions of the hot, surveilled, impoverished camp, Hane was able to attend impromptu classes taught in the style of Socrates by a philosophy student interned in the camp.

By 1943, it had become possible for people to leave the camp if they were getting jobs in inland states. Hane signed up for a job in the U.S. military, as he feared being declared a liar, given that he had already professed loyalty to the United States. Government officials deemed Hane as an “enemy alien, potentially dangerous” because his return to the U.S. was not long before his detainment. Hane disagreed, referring to himself as a “physical coward” and not a threat to the country. By 1943, Hane got an interview for a job tutoring soldiers in the Japanese language program at Yale, which led to his release from the internment camp. He went to Chicago to be interviewed for the position. He was then hired and sent to New Haven, Connecticut to start his professional career at $600 per year for this part-time Japanese teacher role. It was at this time when he found a passion for history after going to lectures at Yale. He reports reading many classic historical fiction novels at this time, such as Native Son and Grapes of Wrath. Despite the challenges he had gone through, Hane considered the camp as having one positive impact on his life, that it allowed him the opportunity to go to college and work as a professor instead of staying a vegetable farmer.

=== Education at Yale ===
After World War II ended, Hane began a bachelor's degree at Yale. He gravitated towards history courses and was taught by Bernard Knox, Robert Lopez, and Samuel Bemis. In 1947, he had kidney problems and took a year off of work. He soon met Rose Kanemoto, who was working as a doctor's assistant. They married in 1948. They had two daughters, named Laurie and Jennifer. He earned his B.A. in 1952 and went on to finish a master's degree in 1953. In graduate school, he took courses with Professor Vernadsky, Hajo Holborn, and Franklin Le van Baumer, who inspired Hane to write a dissertation on the influence of English liberalism on Meiji Japan in the 1868-1890 period.

During 1957 and 1958, Hane was a Fulbright research fellow at Tokyo University, assigned to Masao Maruyama. Just after Sputnik was launched, one of his friends who was in the air force told him to travel on the Siberian railway and take photos of the various train stops, and so, doubting this plan, he visited the Soviet Embassy in Tokyo, where he was immediately dismissed. Later, when working at Knox College, an FBI agent called him out of his office to ask him why he had gone to the Soviet Union, and Hane cleared up the confusion, explaining that he had just gone to the embassy to ask a question about traveling to Siberia. In 1958 and 1959, he became a student at LMU Munich, Germany, in the field of language, to study concepts which he would use while translating one of Maruyama's works. Hane earned his B.A. (1952), M.A. (1953), and Ph.D. (1957) from Yale University.

== Academic career ==
From 1959 to 1961, Hane was an assistant professor of history at the University of Toledo. While working there, Hane explained, he found that “the best way to learn history is to teach it.” He primarily taught Western civilization classes there. In the summer of 1963, he studied Indian civilization at the University of Mysore on a Fulbright grant.

From 1961 to 1966, he was an assistant professor of history at Knox College. Hane taught some courses on Japanese studies in a collaborative program with nearby Monmouth College. While teaching Western Civ, Hane was required to give a lecture in Knox's Beecher Chapel on Renaissance Art to all 250 freshman students taking it. He later wrote, jokingly, “I believe it was my lecture on Renaissance Art that led the faculty to drop the Western Civ requirement and tear down Beecher Chapel”. In 1963, Hane gave a faculty seminar lecture on “The Japanese Language and the Japanese Mode of Thought.” After some difficulties deciding what to write, Hane decided to write about peasants, as he saw himself as a peasant, having lived in Japan, California, and Arizona as one. In September 1966, he was promoted to associate professor of history. In 1972, he became a professor of history.

In 1976, Hane was promoted to Szold Distinguished Service Professor of History, an endowed professorship. At this time, Hane's wife, Rose Hane, was the secretary of the Knox College Library. From 1980 until 1983, Hane was a member of the Teaching Division of the American Historical Association. In 1982, he translated Emperor Hirohito and his Chief Aide-de-Camp, The Honjo Diary, 1933-1936. While at Knox, he taught a wide variety of history courses at Knox including Japanese, Chinese, Indian, and Russian history along with the traditional Western civilization sequence. He wrote many books about Japanese history. Some focused on its modern history through the experiences of peasants and women, as found in their own diaries and documents. Other writings concerned Japanese thought in comparison with other historical developments, including English liberalism and German nationalism.

Hane's textbooks, especially the two renowned titles Reflections on the Way to the Gallows: Rebel Women in Prewar Japan and Peasants, Rebels, Women, and Outcastes: The Underside of Modern Japan were different from the types of works on Japanese history then in vogue. Hane's writings do not romanticize or rely on stereotypes which position emperors and samurai as any more central to Japan's history than peasants and rebellious women. Hane's intention was to stay true to his roots, specializing his research on what he knew well:

... you’re better off working on and writing about something that you are really steeped in … I was born a peasant, grew up in Hollister as a peasant, carried honey buckets around in a Japanese village as a peasant, slept with scorpions in Arizona as a peasant. I finally decided that my misbegotten hope of gliding about in the rarified sphere of intellectual history was a self-deluding ego trip and that one can’t escape one’s roots. Peasant I was born, peasant I was raised, peasant I remained.

However, Hane's work faced criticism by some of his Japanese friends, saying that he needed to concentrate on “the real Japan” which includes the stereotypical “flower arranging, tea ceremonies, art” rather than peasants. He was even described as a “third-rate Marxist, male radical historian.”

In 1985, he won a Burlington Northern Foundation Faculty Achievement Award, and from 1985 until 1988, he was a member of the board of directors and Northeast Asia council of the Association for Asian Studies. From 1987 to 1988, Hane was president of the Midwest Conference on Asian Affairs. He gave a lecture at Knox on his experiences during his internment in WWII on February 22, 1991. Later, he won Senate confirmation as a member of the National Council on the Humanities, after being nominated by President Bush, on March 25, 1991. In 1992, Hane retired from Knox as emeritus professor, and he continued teaching three courses per year and writing books until his death. He was awarded an Honorary degree, doctor of humane letters, by Knox College in 1997. In 2003, the Asian Studies Association created the Mikiso Hane Undergraduate Research Prize in Asian Studies in honor of Hane's scholarship. After retirement, Knox College created another prize in his name, the Mikiso Hane East Asian Studies Prize.

During his academic career, he spoke at other colleges and the First United Presbyterian Church. He appeared on local newspapers numerous times in celebration of his nomination to the 26-member National Council on the Humanities, an interview of his memory of the WWII internment camp, and generally for his academic contribution to Knox College. Titles that featured articles about Mikiso Hane included Galesburg's The Register-Mail, the Quad-City Times, The Galesburg Post, the Knoxville Journal, Peoria's Journal Star, The Dispatch and Rock Island Argus, The Knox Student, and the school's magazines.

He delivered a ‘final lecture’ called “Learning History: A Bewildering Journey from Hollister to Galesburg” on May 21, 1992, for Mortar Board’s Last Lecture Series. In 2002, discussing what lessons he had learned from his life experiences, Hane explained,

… if you write about things that are linked to your personal life, it makes more sense to you. It becomes more meaningful to you, so that if you learn, say, from history, you could start from yourself and you could extend that … that will give you a better sense of “Why study history?” That there is a linkage in human life.

== Later life ==
Hane died at 81 on December 8, 2003, in OSF St. Francis Medical Center in Peoria, likely from cancer. A memorial service was held for him at Knox College on February 14, 2004.

== Books ==
- Mikiso Hane and Kunio Odaka, Economic Organization of the Li Tribes of Hainan Island. Connecticut: New Haven, Yale University, Southeast Asia Studies, 1950.
- Mikiso Hane, Japan: A Historical Survey. New York: Charles Scribner's Sons, 1972.
- Mikiso Hane, The World of Mankind, Cultures in Transition. Follett Publishing Co., 1973.
- Maruyama Masao, Kindai Nihon Seiji Shisoshi Kenkyu (Studies in the Intellectual History of Tokugawa Japan). trans. Mikiso Hane. Tokyo and Princeton: Tokyo and Princeton University presses, 1974.
- Emperor Hirohito and His Chief Aide-de-Camp: the Honjo Diary, 1933-36. Introduction and trans. Mikiso Hane. Tokyo: University of Tokyo Press, 1982.
- Mikiso Hane, Peasants, Rebels, and Outcastes: The Underside of Modern Japan. New York: Pantheon Books, 1982.
- Mikiso Hane, Peasants, Rebels, Women, and Outcastes: The Underside of Modern Japan, 2nd Ed. Maryland: Rowman & Littlefield Publishers, Inc., 2003.
- Mikiso Hane, Modern Japan: A Historical Survey. Boulder: Westview Press, 1986.
- Mikiso Hane, Reflections on the Way to the Gallows: Rebel Women in Prewar Japan. University of California Press and Pantheon Books, 1988.
- Mikiso Hane, Premodern Japan: A Historical Survey. Boulder: Westview Press, 1990.
- Mikiso Hane, Germany and Japan: Comparative Developments. Illinois: Knox College, 1993.
- Kumazawa Makoto, Nihon no Rodoshazo (Image of Japanese Workers). trans. Mikiso Hane. Colorado: Westview Press, 1995.
- Irokawa Daikichi, Showashi to Tenno (Showa History and the Emperor). trans. Mikiso Hane. Free Press, 1995.
- Mikiso Hane, Eastern Phoenix: Japan since 1945. Colorado: Westview Press, 1996.
- Mikiso Hane, Japan: A Short History. Oxford: Oneworld, 2000.

Hane wrote the introduction to the English version of The Prison Memoirs of a Japanese Woman, by Kaneko Fumiko.
