= Oka Asajirō =

Japanese zoologist

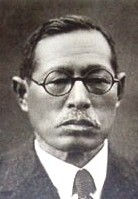
Oka Asajirō

Oka Asajirō (丘浅次郎; 18 November 1868–2 May 1944) was a Japanese zoologist and science writer best known for introducing Charles Darwin's theory of evolution to a general Japanese audience.

== Life and career ==
Oka graduated from the University of Tokyo and studied in Germany between 1891 and 1894. He subsequently returned to Japan and became a professor at Tokyo Higher Teacher's College. He specialized in comparative morphology and anatomy, with animals he studied including ascidians, leeches, tunicates, and freshwater jellyfish.

Oka wrote educational textbooks as well as essays for a general audience, often critiquing aspects of contemporary civilization. One of his best-known works, Lectures on Evolutional Theory (1904), presented Darwinian evolution in straightforward terms and reached a broad audience, including secondary school students. He is considered one of the most influential Japanese thinkers on civilizational issues, and often applied evolutionary thinking to social and political questions, for example, in his work From Groups of Apes to Republic (1924). He was a noted critic of the rigid, dogmatic style of ethical education common in Japan at the time, arguing instead for a more objective, science-based approach to teaching.
