= Itō Noe =

Japanese editor and activist (1895–1923)

- 伊藤 野枝
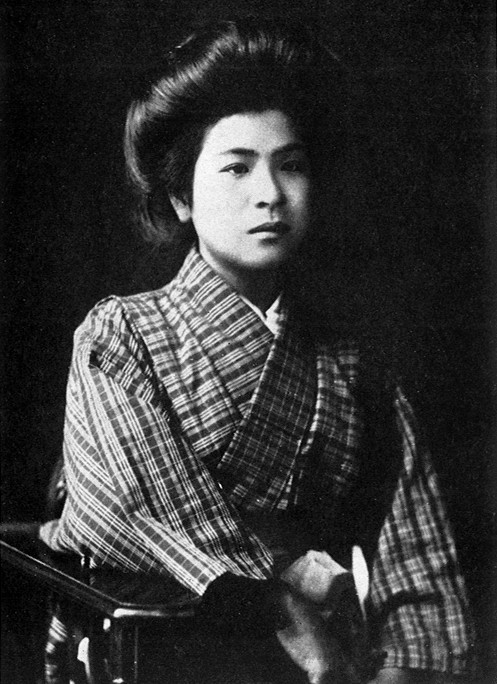
- Born: January 21, 1895; Fukuoka, Japan
- Died: September 16, 1923 (aged 28); Tokyo, Japan
- Spouse: Jun Tsuji

Itō Noe (伊藤 野枝; January 21, 1895 – September 16, 1923) was a Japanese anarchist, social critic, author, and feminist. She was the editor-in-chief of the feminist magazine Seitō (Bluestocking). Her progressive anarcha-feminist ideology challenged the norms of the Meiji and Taishō periods in which she lived. She drew praise from critics for her ability to weave her personal and political ideas into her writings. The Japanese government, however, condemned her for challenging the constructs of the time. She became a martyr of the anarchist ideology in which she believed during the Amakasu Incident, when she was murdered along with her lover, anarchist author Ōsugi Sakae, and his nephew.

== Early life and education ==
Itō was born on the island of Kyushu near Fukuoka, Japan on January 21, 1895. She was born into an aristocratic family and convinced an uncle to pay for her education at Ueno Girls High School in Tokyo, from which she graduated. It was at this school where she developed an affinity for literature. She was particularly fond of the progressive ideas of the time from Western and Japanese writers.

It was during her second summer vacation, in 1910, at Ueno Girls School that her family pressured her to marry Suematsu Fukutaro, a man who had recently returned to Kyushu from the United States. Marrying Suematsu was a condition for continuing her education. Itō wanted her own complete freedom, so she immediately started to plot a way to escape the relationship and make her home in Tokyo. She made a major move in her life to Tokyo, marrying an ex-teacher, Tsuji Jun, whom she had met at Ueno Girls High School. After graduation, Itō's relationship with Tsuji became romantic and they had two sons, Makoto (born January 20, 1914) and Ryūji (born August 10, 1915). They were officially married in 1915. Their relationship lasted about four years.

== Time with Seitō ==
Itō joined the Bluestocking Society (青鞜社 Seitō-sha), as producer of the feminist arts-and-culture magazine Seitō (青鞜) in 1915, contributing until 1916. In her last year as editor-in-chief, she practiced an inclusive attitude towards content; she "opened the pages to extended discussions of abortion, prostitution, free love and motherhood". Seitō founder, Hiratsuka Raichō, would describe her as a writer with intense and natural emotion. Itō's time as editor was fragile, as many thought the young editor would not be capable of steering the publication. On the cover of the July 1916 issue Itō published her "Anti-Manifesto," in which she discusses the views of the readership on her capabilities. She ends the editor's note with a declaration that the magazine will be "for all women, a magazine which has no ideology and no philosophy."

Under Itō's editorship, Seitō became a more radical journal, which led the government to ban five issues as threatening the kokutai (national system of government). The February 1914 edition was banned by the censors because of a short story Itō had published in the journal titled Shuppon ("Flight"), about a young woman who escapes from an arranged marriage and is then betrayed by her lover who promised to escape with her from Japan. The June 1915 edition was banned for an article calling for abortion to be legalized in Japan.

Three other editions of Seitō were banned: one edition because of an erotic short story where a woman happily remembers having sex the previous night; another edition for a short story dealing with the break-up of an arranged marriage, and another edition for an article titled "To the Women of the World" calling for women to marry for love. The narratives in Itō's stories held common themes: they were all influenced by her own thoughts on her political and personal beliefs, painting a vivid literary picture of the issues afflicting her at the time.

Her personal writings published in Seitō dealt with the many problems that she had dealt with in her own life such as arranged marriages, denial of the free love she much longed for, and the sexual nature that all humans felt but had been repressed. Her short story "Mayoi" in 1914 told the story of a student who moves in with her ex-school teacher, only to find out he had been intimate with her former classmate. This story directly parallels her own life with Tsuji Jun. "Tenki", another one of her stories published by Seitō, dealt with more of her own issues, as the main protagonist is drawn to social activism while her marriage proves to be an obstacle. Itō's writing was a way for her to express her personal beliefs, and she often used her own real life events to draw upon in order to create her stories. In total, she contributed 61 pieces to the magazine.

Under Itō, Seitō became more concerned with social issues than it had been before, and in 1914–16, she engaged in a debate on the pages of the magazine with another feminist, Yamakawa Kikue, about whether prostitution should be legalized or not. Itō argued for the legalization of prostitution for the same reasons that she favored the legalization of abortion, namely that she believed that women's bodies belonged only to them, and that the state had no business telling a woman what she may or may not do with her body.

Furthermore, Itō argued that the social system did not offer many economic opportunities to women and that most Japanese prostitutes were destitute women who turned to selling sex in order to survive, which led her to the conclusion that they should not be punished for merely seeking a means to live. Itō wrote social criticism and novels, and translated socialist and anarchist writings from English to Japanese, from authors such as American Emma Goldman (The Tragedy of Woman's Emancipation, etc.). In February 1916, Seitō published its last edition due to a lack of funds, as the government had prevented distributors from carrying the magazine.

== Life with Sakae Ōsugi ==
Itō met Ōsugi Sakae in 1916. Together they worked in both political activism and political writings. As a couple they practiced free love and never married. Ōsugi had been married with another woman at the time and also had an affair with feminist Ichiko Kamichika.

Itō's passion for Ōsugi became evident in February 1916, when she went walking with him in a Tokyo park, holding his hand, and kissed him in public; at the time, kissing in public and couples holding hands in Japan were considered to be deeply immoral acts that no decent person should ever engage in, and many people in the park chided the couple for their behavior. Later that same day, when Ōsugi met Ichiko, he told her that he had kissed a woman in public for the first time in his life, to which Ichiko reacted with jealousy.

Itō, who was hoping to see Ōsugi again, had followed him to Ichiko's apartment, where she was listening in. She chose to knock on the door to involve herself in this conversation. This in turn caused an angry scene between the two women over who loved Ōsugi the best, while Ōsugi insisted he loved both equally. Ōsugi continued to live with his wife while seeing both Ichiko and Itō until November 1916, when in a moment of jealousy Ichiko followed Ōsugi and Itō to a countryside inn. Upon seeing that they had spent the night together, she attacked Ōsugi with a knife as he emerged from his room in the morning, stabbing him several times in the throat. Ōsugi was hospitalized as a result of his wounds and his wife left him during his stay in hospital.

Itō and Ōsugi would have four children together, and would stay together for the rest of their lives despite never actually being legally married. Her relationship with him would remain political as well, as she worked with him as a publishing partner. They would work together to further their ideas on anarchism through their writings and publishings, and would both become targets of the state and critics through their unabashed loyalty to their cause. In 1921, Itō wrote articles published in Rōdō Undō (Labor Movement), a journal which she published with Ōsugi.

Beginning in 1916, Ito lived and worked with Ōsugi, and continued to rise in the feminist group while showing growing leadership potential. As an anarchist, Itō was highly critical of the existing political system in Japan, which led her to call for an anarchism to exist in "everyday practice," namely that people should in various small ways seek routinely to undermine the "kokutai". Itō was especially critical of the way that most Japanese people automatically deferred to the state and accepted the claim that the emperor was a god who had to be obeyed unconditionally, leading her to complain that it was very difficult to get most people to think critically. As someone who had challenged the kokutai, Itō was constantly harassed by the police, to the point that she complained of feeling that her home was a prison, as she could not go out without a policeman stopping her.

== Death ==
On September 16, 1923, Itō, Ōsugi, and his 6-year-old nephew Munekazu (born in Portland, Oregon) were arrested, strangled to death, and thrown into an abandoned well by a squad of military police (known as the Kempeitai) led by Lieutenant Masahiko Amakasu. The atrocity happened in the chaos immediately following the Great Kantō earthquake. Once the bodies were retrieved from the well, both Ōsugi and Itō's bodies were inspected and found to be covered with bruises indicating that they had been severely beaten. Itō and Ōsugi were strangled in their cells. Noe Itō was 28 years old. The killing of such high-profile anarchists, together with a young child, became known as the Amakasu Incident and sparked shock and anger throughout Japan. Amakasu was arrested and sentenced to ten years in prison for the murders, but he was released after serving only three years.

Itō and Ōsugi are both buried in the Kutsunoya cemetery in Aoi-ku, Shizuoka.

== Legacy ==
Director Kijū Yoshida made Eros + Massacre in 1969, about Sakae Ōsugi; Itō features prominently in the film.

A drama based on Yuka Murayama's 2020 novel Kaze yo, Arashi yo, starring Yuriko Yoshitaka as Itō, was broadcast on three NHK channels: NHK 8K on 31 March 2022 (one 120-minute episode), and NHK 4K and NHK BS Premium on 4, 11 and 18 September 2022 (three 49-minute episodes).
