= Amakasu Incident =

1923 police murder of 3 people in Japan

- Part of the Kantō Massacre
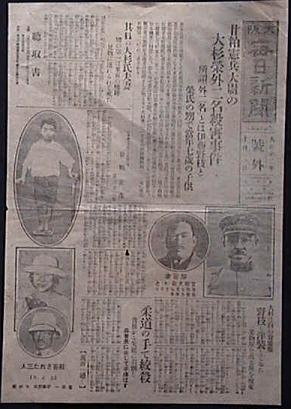
- A clip from the Mainichi Shimbun, on the death of Itō Noe, Ōsugi Sakae and Munekazu Tachibana.
- Date: 16 September 1923
- Attack type: Extrajudicial killing
- Victim: Ōsugi Sakae Itō Noe Munekazu Tachibana
- Perpetrators: Kempeitai, led by Masahiko Amakasu

The Amakasu Incident (甘粕事件, Amakasu Jiken) was a 1923 political murder of two prominent Japanese anarchists, Ōsugi Sakae and Itō Noe, together with Ōsugi's six-year-old nephew Munekazu Tachibana. It was committed by military police, led by Lieutenant Masahiko Amakasu. For the murder, Amakasu was sentenced to seven years and six months, and was released after having served only two years, thanks to an amnesty.

== History ==
During the chaos that followed the catastrophic 1923 Great Kantō earthquake, Japanese authorities killed many dissidents and ethnic Koreans in what became known as the Kantō Massacre. Itō, Ōsugi, and his nephew were arrested on 16 September.

According to writer and activist Jakucho Setouchi, Itō, Ōsugi, and his 6-year-old nephew were arrested, beaten to death, and thrown into an abandoned well by a squad of military police led by Lieutenant Masahiko Amakasu. Literary scholar Patricia Morley wrote that Itō and Ōsugi were strangled in their cells. Both accounts agree that both or all of the prisoners were brutally executed without a trial, where convictions and death sentences for the two adults would have been almost guaranteed.

These killings, which became known as the Amakasu Incident, sparked widespread anger. The historian John Crump argued that "once again, the most able anarchist of his generation had been murdered", echoing the execution of Kōtoku Shūsui in the High Treason Incident just twelve years prior.

While many were outraged in Japan, thousands signed petitions requesting leniency on Amakasu's behalf. The murders drew attention in the United States, since the child was a dual-national with American citizenship, having been born in Portland, Oregon. Efforts to get the American Embassy involved were unsuccessful. One embassy official made a brief statement on the case.

"In the case, even, of an unquestioned American citizen involved in trial in a foreign court, the law of that country must take its course, and we can only be interested in seeing that the trial is fair and the law impartially applied."

Amakasu and four other Imperial Japanese Army soldiers were court-martialed for the murders. During the trial, Amakasu's lawyers tied the murder to soldierly duties, and the ideals of spontaneity, sincerity, and pure motives. They argued that Sakae and Noe were traitors, and Amakasu killed them out of an irresistible urge to protect his country.

As for the murder of the child, they argued that this was still justifiable for the public good. Many in the courtroom sympathized with these arguments, with spectators loudly calling Amakasu a "kokushi" (hero). The judge did nothing to intervene.

Even the military prosecutor, while unwilling to accept the defense's arguments as an excuse, was sympathetic. Believing that Amakasu had merely acted excessively, he said the officer's patriotism "brought tears into one's eyes". As such, he demanded only 15 years in prison with hard labour for Amakasu, and lesser punishments for the other defendants.

The judge was even more lenient. Amakasu was sentenced to ten years in prison with hard labour, and IJA sergeant Keijiro Mori was sentenced to three years in prison with hard labour as an accomplice. The other three men were acquitted, two on the grounds of superior orders, and the other due to insufficient evidence.

In August 1924, Amakasu's sentence was reduced to 7 years and six months. Amakasu was released due to an amnesty in October 1926. He studied in France and became a special agent for the Imperial Japanese Army in Manchuria.

== See also ==
- Anarchism in Japan
- Toranomon incident
- Kameido incident
