= Masanosuke Watanabe =

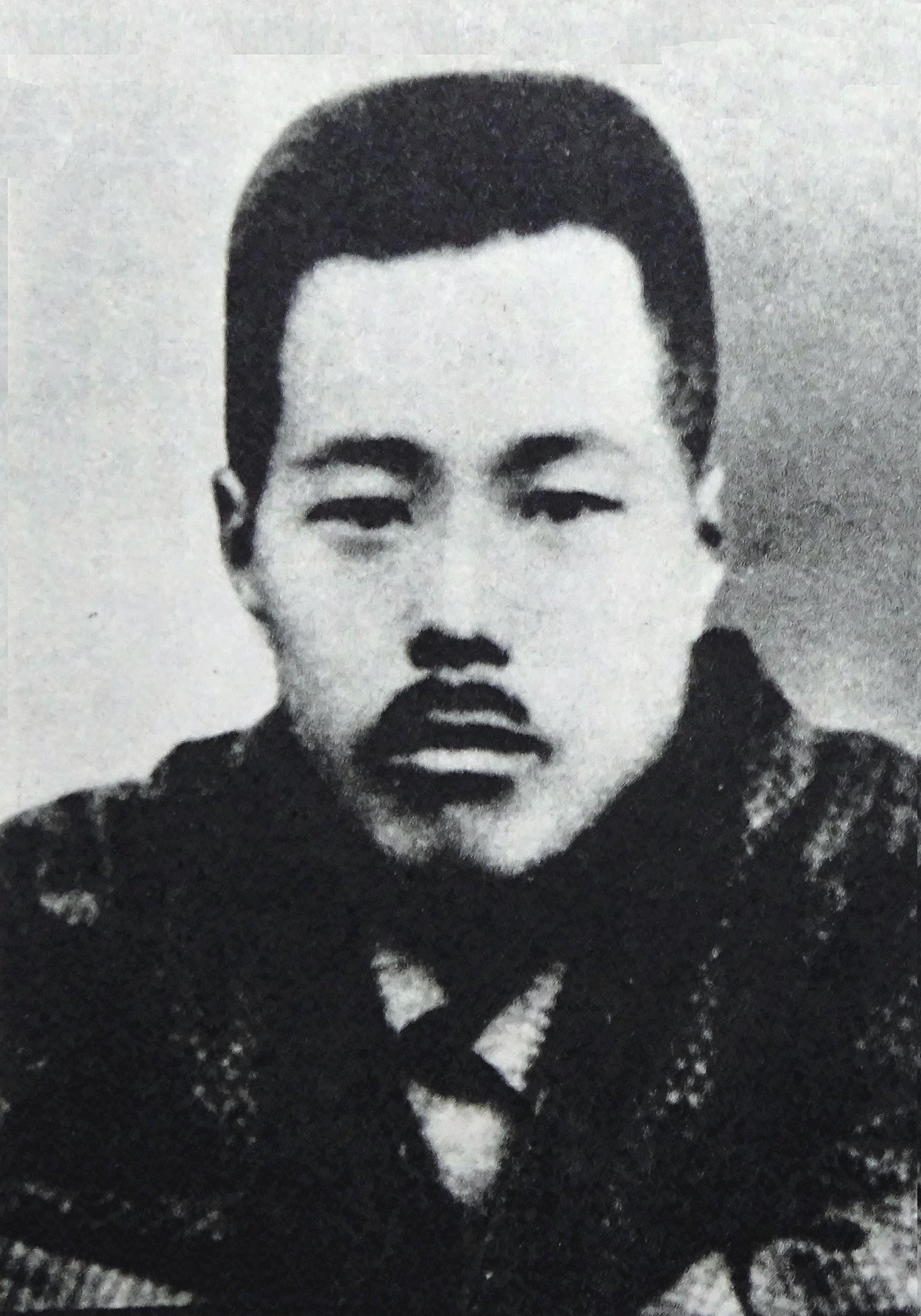

Masanosuke Watanabe (渡辺 政之輔, Watanabe Masanosuke; September 7, 1899 - October 6, 1928) was a Japanese labor activist who served as the chairman of the Japanese Communist Party from March 1928 until his death in October 1928, while the party was outlawed under the Peace Preservation Law.

== Early life ==
Watanabe was born in 1899 in Ichikawa, Chiba Prefecture. He was the son of a tatami mat maker. After graduating primary school in 1912, he went to Tokyo to work in a wine shop. In 1917, he worked in a celluloid factory in Kamedo section of Tokyo. While employed there, Watanabe got a tattoo of the name "Kou", after his girlfriend Nomura Kou, on his left forearm.

== Political activism ==
Watanabe organized the National Celluloid Workers Union in Tokyo in 1919. He joined the Japanese Communist Party soon after its establishment in 1922. He used the alias "Asano" during his years in the Communist Party. On 15 March, 1924, he married Tanno Setsu, a labour activist, and member of the Communist Party. The marriage was not legally recognized, however, as there was no permission from Tanno's parents, who needed to approve the marriage since their daughter was under 25 years old at the time.

In March 1927, he went to Moscow to represent the JCP at the Comintern, and the eighth enlarged plenum of the ECCI. That same year, Watanabe returned to Japan and took over the leadership of the party. In March 1928, he was elected chairman of the JCP central committee.

Watanabe escaped Japan during mass arrests on March 15, 1928. He traveled to Formosa (modern-day Taiwan) disguised as a dry goods merchant.

== Death ==
While at Shuishang railway station to wait for a train headed for Keelung, Watanabe was chosen for a search by a local police officer, but evaded custody by shooting the officer with a concealed pistol. During the subsequent chase by police, he committed suicide by gunshot. Watanabe's remains were returned to his family in Japan in November 1929 and buried at an Ankoku-ji temple in Ichikawa.
