= Tane maku Hito =

Japanese literary magazine

Tane maku Hito (種蒔く人, "The Sower") was a Japanese proletarian literary magazine in the early 1920s.

== Overview ==
Tane maku Hito was a Japanese proletarian literary magazine published in Akita Prefecture, and later Tokyo, between 1921 and 1923.

== Background ==
Much left-leaning literature had been produced in Japan going back to the beginning of the century. With a few noted exceptions, (Note: Such as Takuboku Ishikawa's poetry and essays.) however, these works tended to be, as Japanese literary historian and critic Donald Keene wrote, "immature and sentimental".

Tane maku Hito's founder, Ōmi Komaki, a young man from Tsuchizaki (土崎, a small town in Akita Prefecture), studied in France as a teenager, and he spent World War I there. There, he was heavily influenced by the pacifist movement and, later, the left-leaning Clarté group led by Henri Barbusse, Anatole France and others. Komaki personally promised Barbusse that he would organize an equivalent movement when he returned to Japan.

== Publication history ==
The first Tane maku Hito was founded by Komaki and his friends Yōbun Kaneko (金子洋文) Kenzō Imano (今野賢三) and others in Tsuchizaki in February 1921, and lasted for a scant three issues. Ōmi had recently returned to Japan having participated in Barbusse's anti-war movement. These writers were later joined by Takamaru Sasaki (佐々木孝丸) and Masatoshi Muramatsu (村松正俊), and the magazine was revived in Tokyo in October.

The magazine had an internationalist and anti-militarist outlook, and regularly published literary criticism that emphasized art and literary movements as aspects of the liberation movement.

It ceased publication in October 1923, due to government pressure following the Great Kantō Earthquake. Its final issue, as well as the supplement Tane-maki Ki (種蒔き記), were heavily critical of the massacre of Koreans and socialists in the aftermath of the earthquake.

In total, 21 issues were published, of which four had been banned by government censors before the earthquake.

== Contents ==
Each issue of Tane maku Hito included an "oath" that, in (perhaps deliberately) obscure language, expressed apparent support of the Russian Revolution.

== Reception and legacy ==
Tane maku Hito is generally credited with launching the proletarian literature movement in Japan. Reprints of the magazine were published in 1961 and 1986.

== Works cited ==
- Keene, Donald (1998) [1984]. A History of Japanese Literature, Vol. 3: Dawn to the West – Japanese Literature of the Modern Era (Fiction) (paperback ed.). New York, NY: Columbia University Press. ISBN 978-0-231-11435-6.
- Sofue, Shōji (1994). "Tane maku Hito" 種蒔く人. Encyclopedia Nipponica (in Japanese). Shogakukan.
