= Communist Youth League (Japan) =

Former far-left youth organization in Japan

The Communist Youth League was a youth organization in Japan, active during the 1960s. The organization was the youth wing of the pro-Soviet Preparatory Communission for a Socialist Reform Movement (a.k.a. the 'Socialist Renovation' group), a group that had broken away from the Japanese Communist Party in 1961. Many of its members were former Communist Party student activists, who had resigned or been expelled from the party. Local units of the Communist Youth League were formed in Kyoto, Saitama, Osaka, Hiroshima, Fukuoka and Ibaraki. The Communist Youth League was allied with the Socialist Student Front (the student wing of the Unified Socialist League), and together they constituted the 'Structural Reform' faction inside Zengakuren.
