= Feminism in Japan =

Feminism in Japan began with women's rights movements that date back to antiquity. The movement started to gain momentum after Western thinking was brought into Japan during the Meiji Restoration in 1868. Japanese feminism differs from Western feminism in that less emphasis is placed on individual autonomy.

Prior to the late 19th century, Japanese women were bound by the traditional patriarchal system where senior male members of the family maintain their authority in the household. After the reforms brought by Meiji Restoration, women's status in Japanese society also went through series of changes. Trafficking of women was restricted, women were allowed to request divorces, and both boys and girls were required to receive elementary education. However, major restrictions still remained towards women. Further changes to women's status came about in the aftermath of World War II. Women received the right to vote, and a section of the new constitution drafted in 1946 was dedicated to guarantee gender equality.

In 1970, in the wake of the anti–Vietnam War movements, a new women's liberation movement called ūman ribu (woman lib) emerged in Japan from the New Left and radical student movements in the late 1960s. This movement was in sync with radical feminist movements in the United States and elsewhere, catalyzing a resurgence of feminist activism through the 1970s and beyond. The activists forwarded a comprehensive critique of the male-dominated nature of modern Japan, arguing for a fundamental change of the political-economic system and culture of the society. What distinguished them from previous feminist movements was their emphasis on sexual liberation (性の解放, sei no kaihō). They did not aim for equality with men, but rather focused on calling for men's liberation from the oppressive aspects of a patriarchal and capitalist system.

In 1979, the Convention on the Elimination of All Forms of Discrimination Against Women was adopted by the United Nations General Assembly. The Japanese government ratified it in 1985.

== Historical Context ==
=== Meiji Restoration and the initial phase of Japanese Feminism ===
Following the Meiji Restoration in 1868 and the formation of a new, modern capitalist nation-state, Japanese women were affixed to the role of 'good wives and wise mothers' (Ryōsai kenbo). They were expected to contribute to the state's pursuit of a 'wealthy country and strong army' (Fukoku kyōhei) under total subjugation of the patriarchal society and male head of the household. Simultaneously, however, the late 19th century also saw the emergence of early feminist consciousness–partly due to the dissemination of liberal ideas from the West which gave rise to increasing desires for emancipation and equal recognition. While only a small part of the Japan's civil rights movement or the 'Freedom and People's Rights Movement' (Jiyū Minken Ūndo) of the 1870s and 1880s constituted women, it nurtured some of the most prominent feminists of Japan. One such figure was Kishida Toshiko, who was the first female to publicly address the issue of women's rights within the broader Popular Rights Movement. She was critical of the existing societal conventions based on the Confucian principles that placed women in an inferior position to men courtesy of biological differences, and called for a change in the status quo. Many women across the country were drawn to her, including Fukuda Hideko, who later went on to become the founding editor of Japan's first socialist women's newspaper, Seikai Fujin, following a series of tumultuous life events. Thus, with the mobilization of the nation-state to pursue a path of modernization coinciding with the emergence of new liberal ideas influenced from the West, the later years of the 19th century was colored with popular discourses on people's rights, including those of women, which laid the foundation for the feminist movement in Japan.

== Politics & Society ==
=== First Wave Feminism and the 'New Woman' ===
Inspiration from Henrik Ibsen's Nora in A Doll's House permeated Japanese society, prompting a group of young women, who called themselves 'New Women', to embrace new forms of self-expression that transgressed established gender norms. The 'new woman' symbolized a radical departure from the traditional idea of female identity that was rooted in the patriarchal values of 'good wife, wise mother' imposed by the state, and instead represented women taking control of their lives, sexuality, and identity. From this milieu emerged Hiratsuka Raichō who founded the Bluestocking Society (Seitō) and its literary journal in 1911, which featured debates on themes such as chastity, abortion, and prostitution.

==== Bluestocking Society (Seitō-sha) and Seitō Magazine ====
The Seitō magazine disseminated Hiratsuka's seminal work, "In the beginning, woman was the Sun" and Yosano Akiko's "Mountain Moving Day" in its first issue. While the Seitō was not free of scandal, it certainly provided a platform for intellectual debates that contested mainstream ideas, even bringing taboo topics into public discourse. What began as an initiative for women's literary expression for liberation from the Japanese Confucian-based family system, the Seitō began to be increasingly concerned with larger social issues including the politics of prostitution. With eccentric dressing style and habits, sometimes leading them to cafés and entertainment quarters as sightseers, the public saw them as daring to transgress the boundaries of social respectability; the 'New Woman' came to be associated with "scandalous women of the Bluestocking society."

==== Key Intellectual Debates: The Motherhood Protection Debate (bosei hogo undō) ====
Public debates through journals were one of the ways in which ideas were disseminated and feminist intellectuals engaged with one another. One such significant debate in the course of Japanese feminism was on the question of motherhood protection from the state (bosei hogo undō). It was a highly contested issue, mainly between the two thinkers–Hiratsuka Raichō and Yosano Akiko, also involving others such as Yamakawa Kikue and Yamada Waka. Intellectuals like Hiratsuka Raichō recognized the unique social contribution of mothers and the simultaneous burden it placed on women and demanded economic independence in the form of state assistance. In turn, Yosano Akiko criticized Hiratsuka for glorifying motherhood and argued that her stance reinforced the ‘dependence mentality’ on the patriarchal state thereby undermining the individual abilities of women.According to her, fatherhood was equally important as motherhood and that women should only bear children if they were economically independent. Hiratsuka responded by pointing out Yosano’s privileged position as a successful poet, and that many of the actual women found it immensely difficult to earn for themselves under the existing system. She had also included in her consideration, the issues surrounding illegitimate children where mothers had to raise them outside of the conventional family structure. The debate got more complex with the intervention of other contributors, Yamada Waka and socialist feminist, Yamakawa Kikue.

Yamada Waka provided an alternative perspective to the discourse; her stance was akin to that of the state, emphasizing the family as the basic unit of society. She recognized that men and women had different functions to perform, and if men earned enough wages to support the family, the issue of motherhood protection would be resolved. On the contrary, Yamakawa Kikue criticized how neither Hiratsuka nor Yosano challenged the capitalist system which was the true culprit that forced many women into their plight. She called for a change in the economic system itself, that is, a socialist revolution.

The motherhood protection debate brought about new questions about the relationship between the individual and the state, as well as on the nature of the feminist movement introducing different worldviews despite advocating for a similar goal. Consequently, each of the intellectuals went on to pursue feminist activism through their own paths such as the formation of the New Women’s Association by Hiratsuka and others, although it fell under the wider umbrella movement.

==== Formation of the New Woman Association ====
In 1919, with the help of Ichikawa Fusae and Oku Mumeo, Hiratsuka Raichō created the New Woman Association: Shin Fujin Kyokai. Their goal was to achieve rights of protection and inclusion through identifying a female class. In November 1919, Hiratsuka delivered a speech at the All-Kansai Federation of Women's Organizations titled "Toward the Unification of Women." It stated that if women had rights, they would be able to be part of the state and help determine its future.

The following January, Ichikawa and Hiratsuka drafted the two demands of the New Woman Association.

- Firstly, they wanted to amend the Public Peace Politic Law, a revised version of the 1890 Law on Political Association and Assembly, which banned women from joining any political party or attending or participating in political events.
- Secondly, they wanted protection from husbands and fiancés with venereal diseases. The Revised Civil Code of 1898 stated that a woman who commits adultery is subject to divorce and up to two years in prison. However, a woman was unable to divorce her husband if he committed adultery. Challenging patriarchal society, the New Woman Association wanted reforms so that women could reject infected husbands or fiancés. They prepared petitions and any opposition was met by arguing that such measures would enable women to become better wives and mothers.

Two petitions were prepared. The first addressed the need to give women rights and to include women in the state by revising the Public Peace Police Law. The second addressed the need to protect women by testing future husbands for sexually transmitted diseases and would allow women to divorce husbands and collect compensation for medical expenses. The Diet was adjourned before the petitions could make it to the floor. On February 26, 1921, the House of Representatives passed a bill to allow women to attend political meetings. The bill was defeated in the House of Peers. In 1922, the Diet amended Article 5 in the 1900 Police Law, allowing women to attend political gatherings while continuing to forbid them from joining political parties and voting.

==== The Red Wave Society ====
The Red Wave Society, Sekirankai, was the first socialist women's association. Yamakawa Kikue and others organized the association in April 1921. The Red Wave's manifesto condemned capitalism, arguing that it turned women into slaves and prostitutes. Rural families were forced to contract their daughters to factories due to financial difficulties. These girls were required to live in dormitories, unable to leave except to go to work. They worked 12-hour shifts in poor conditions.

Many caught brown lung, a disease caused by exposure to cotton dust in poorly ventilated working environments, and other illnesses related to working in textile factories (Ravina). The state refused to enact legislation needed to protect women in the factories. There were no on-call doctors in the dorms and no medical compensation for contracting brown lung or any other illnesses. After the contract ended, they returned to the countryside to be married. The Red Wave Society mainly focused on suffrage and women's rights.

Shortly after its founding, women from The Red Wave Society took part in a demonstration on May 1, 1921. Preparation for this event prompted the creation of the first draft of the Red Wave Society manifesto to be written by Yamakawa Kikue. Kikue openly lived as a staunch socialist as early as the 1910s and believed in the complete abolition of capitalism. Kikue's socialist views were presented in the manifesto as well. This manifesto was printed and scattered during the protest with the hope that the leaflets would prompt other women to support The Red Wave Societies cause. All the women who attended this event were placed under arrest by police.

Other groups were formed concentrating on their own demands. Some women pushed for political rights while others looked to end prostitution. Housewives campaigned to improve their roles at home. After the devastating 1923 Great Kantō earthquake, Kubushiro Ochimi, a member of the Women's Reform Society, and many other women, turned to the relief effort. Socialists like Yamakawa, middle-class Christians and housewives worked together to organize and provide relief activities.

==== The Tokyo Federation of Women's Organizations ====
On September 28, 1923, 100 leaders from many organizations came together to form the Tokyo Federation of Women's Organizations: Tokyo Rengo Funjinkai. They divided into five sections: society, employment, labour, education, and government. The government section focused on women's rights and discussed ways to gain membership in the state. The leader of the government section, Kubushiro Ochimi, called a meeting in November 1924 for women interested in working for women's rights. The meeting created the principal women's suffrage organization called the League for the Realization of Women's Suffrage (Fujin Sanseiken Kakutoku Kisei Domei). The organization's goal was to improve the status of Japanese women. In their manifesto they declared that it was female responsibility to destroy the past 2,600 years of customs and to promote natural rights of men and women.

To achieve their goals, the league petitioned for civil rights. In March 1925, the Diet passed the Universal Manhood Suffrage Law (普通選挙法, Futsū Senkyo Hō), allowing all men aged 25 years or older to vote – without imposing any economic qualifications, but excluding all women. They continued to lobby representatives to discuss their issues. In March 1925, four items were to be discussed in the Diet. Many women came to watch as the House of Representatives discussed amending the Public Peace Police Law of 1900, a petition for higher education for women, a petition for women's suffrage in national elections, and a petition to make changes to the City Code of 1888 and the Town and Village Code of 1888, which would allow women to vote and run for local offices. Through the 1930s, feminists believed the best ways to achieve their goals were through protection of laborers, welfare for single mothers, and other activities producing social welfare reforms.

When women in Japan got to vote for the first time on April 10, 1946, it showed that they were truly citizens and full members of the state. Women like Hiratsuka Raicho, Yosano Akiko and Kubushiro Ochimi worked extremely hard to achieve self-transcendence and self-actualization.

With the commencement of Japanese women not only gaining the right to vote, but to run for office as well, many women began to become more politically involved. This resulted in the election of 39 women into the Japanese governments National Diet in the spring of 1946 and the first female Japanese Ministry Bureau Chief was elected the following year in 1947.

==== Modern Girl or 'Moga' ====
1920s Japan saw the emergence of a new sub-culture of ‘Modern Girls.’ The modern girl or ‘moga’ became a symbol of a new consumer culture–the media portrayed them as foreign, frivolous, and indulgent who could easily afford international products. However, many of these modern girls were actual women who worked in factories or were employed in emerging professions such as bus conductors, retail workers, café waitresses, and highly trained employees.

Their representation in society was closely linked to the advancement in print technology as visual images of the modern girl were disseminated through advertisements and illustrations in books and magazines. With high-cut dresses often coupled with floppy hats and a bob-cut–a stark contrast to the traditional kimonos and long hair–these girls represented the most superficial processes of modernization for most liberal intellectuals. Unlike the previous milieu of ‘new women’ who were prominently committed to activism, the modern girl occupied an ambiguous position and were not necessarily politically conscious although they certainly transgressed social boundaries and redefined gender norms. Indeed, there were contradictory expectations from the modern girl with feminists like Hiratsuka envisioning a different meaning for ‘modern girl,’ rejecting the trendy, media sensation. Yet simultaneously, the ‘moga’ became a symbol of new aspiration, especially for women, resulting from the processes of mass production and consumption.

=== Women's suffrage ===
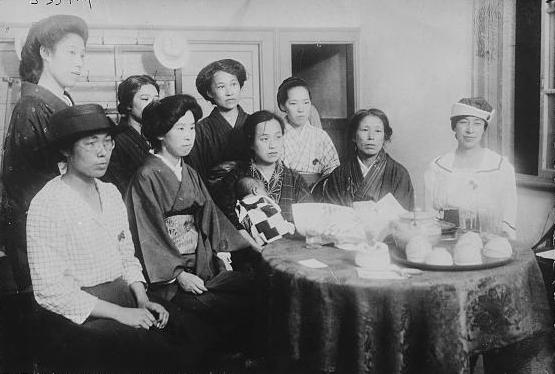
A women's rights group meeting in Tokyo, to push for universal suffrage.

While women's advocacy has been present in Japan since the nineteenth century, aggressive calls for women's suffrage in Japan surfaced during the turbulent interwar period of the 1920s. Enduring a societal, political, and cultural metamorphosis, Japanese citizens lived in confusion and frustration as their nation transitioned from a tiny isolated body to a viable world power. Perhaps one of the most profound examples of this frustration is the fight for women's rights and recognition in Japan.

After the Meiji Restoration in 1868, the concept of rights began to take hold in Japan. During the latter portion of the nineteenth century, the first proponents for women's rights advocated for reforms in the patriarchal society that had oppressed women (not for political inclusion or voting rights). Of prime importance to the early feminist movement was the call for women's education.

Policymakers believed that women's education was imperative to the preservation of the state because it would prepare girls to be knowledgeable wives and mothers capable of producing diligent, nationally loyal sons. Although policymakers did not necessarily have the same motives as women's rights advocates in their call for women's education, the development of such education opened the door for further advancements for women in Japanese society. Also occurring at the end of the nineteenth century was the fight for women's protection from some of the cultural practices that had long subordinated women.

As the topic of women's rights began to gain a larger following, women's advocacy groups slowly developed and tuned their interests to other issues impacting women in Japan. The interwar period, which followed the conclusion of World War I, brought about what has become known as the women's suffrage movement of Japan. Feminists opposed the nation's provision of civil rights to men exclusively and the government's exclusion of women from all political participation. Women in Japan were prohibited by law from joining political parties, expressing political views, and attending political meetings.

By 1920, the fight for women's political inclusion was at the forefront of the suffrage movement. In 1921, women were granted the right to attend political meetings by the Japanese Diet (parliament), which overruled Article 5 of the Police Security Act. Despite positive media coverage, institutional sexism was not completely eradicated. Many members of the Diet felt that it was unnecessary and selfish for women to participate in the government.

After women were granted the right to participate in and attend political assemblies, there was a surge in the development of women's interest groups. Alumni, Christian missionary, and other women's auxiliary groups began to sprout in the interwar period. After a massive earthquake struck Tokyo in 1923, representatives from 43 of these organizations joined forces to become the Tokyo Federation of Women's Organizations (Tokyo Rengo Fujinkai). The federation was designed to serve as a disaster relief organization that aided those impacted by the earthquake. As time progressed, it went on to become one of the largest women's activist groups of the time.

To efficiently address the specific issues impacting the women of Japan, the Tokyo Federation of Women's Organizations divided into five satellite groups: society, government, education, labor, and employment. The government sector was perhaps the most significant of the federation's satellite sectors because it spawned the League for the Realization of Women's Suffrage (Fujin Sanseiken Kakutoku Kisei Domei) which was the most influential and outspoken women's advocacy collective of the time. This League issued a manifesto in 1924. The manifesto was as follows:

1. It is our responsibility to destroy customs which have existed in this country for the past twenty six hundred years and to construct a new Japan that promotes the natural rights of men and women;
2. As women have been attending public school with men for half a century since the beginning of the Meiji period and our opportunities in higher education have continued to expand, it is unjust to exclude women from international suffrage;
3. Political rights are necessary for the protection of nearly four million working women in this country;
4. Women who work in the household must be recognized before the law to realize their full human potential;
5. Without political rights we cannot achieve public recognition at either the national or local level of government;
6. It is both necessary and possible to bring together women of different religions and occupations in a movement for women's suffrage.

The League for the Realization of Women's Suffrage, as well as numerous other women's advocacy groups, continued to fight for social and political inclusion, as well as protection under the law from the patriarchal traditions that continued to plague the country. Their fight continued to progress and make strides until women were finally granted the right to vote in 1946.

=== World War II ===
According to oral history studied by Thomas R.H. Havens, traditional paternalistic norms proved a barrier when the government wanted to exploit woman power more fully for the war effort. Compulsory employment in munitions factories was possible for unmarried women, but social norms prevented married women from doing that sort of work, in sharp contrast to Russia, Britain, Germany and the United States. The absence of so many young men dramatically disrupted long-standing patterns of marriage, fertility, and family life. Severe shortages of ordinary items, including food and housing, were far more oppressive than governmental propaganda efforts. Japanese women nonetheless obediently followed orders, and there were no serious disruptions such as rioting over food shortages. Forced prostitution for the benefit of Japanese soldiers created the "comfort women" program that proved highly embarrassing to Japan for decades after the war. Non-Japanese women from colonies such as Korea and Formosa were especially vulnerable.

Beginning in the late 20th century cultural historians turned their attention to the role of women in wartime, especially the Second World War. Sources often used include magazines published—by men—for female readers. Typically fictional and nonfictional stories focused on social roles as mothers and wives, especially in dealing with hardships of housing and food supplies, and financial concerns in the absence of menfolk at war. Problems of fashion wartime were a high priority in such magazines in all major countries. Historians report that the Japanese textile and fashion industries were highly successful in adapting to wartime shortages and propaganda needs. Magazines for teenage girls emphasized they must follow nationalistic demands that compelled them to give up their adolescent freedoms and transform themselves from "shōjo", which connotes adolescent playfulness, into "gunkoku shōjo" [girls of a military nation], with significant home front responsibilities. Evacuation of women and children from major cities, due to Allied air raids on Japan, was covered in detail to emphasize willingness to sacrifice for patriotism portrayed through fiction, news articles and photographs. The government controlled all the media, and supervise the popular magazines so their Content would strategically spread the government's goals and propaganda.

The descent into war marked a severe increase in government propaganda and censorship as early as the Manchurian Incident in September 1931. This, along with previously mentioned shortages and an emphasis on women remaining as domestic servants made revolution difficult during this time. Furthermore, an increasing amount of feminist and leftist groups which had previously been staunchly anti-government suddenly began to take on a nationalist point of view during this time. While some attribute this sudden shift to things like the states sudden emphasis on the importance of women and motherhood, police brutality and government pressure played a role as well. One activist who remained openly politically socialist during this time was Yamakawa Kikue. Early in the war, Kikue engaged in round table style discussions with popular political figures such as Katayama Tetsu, Tatewaki Sadayo, Hiratsuko Raicho, and Okada Junko. These discussions were frequently critical of the state and caused severe political backlash towards Kikue. Kikue's involvement was eventually censored by the government as conflict in Asia increased, and her husband, Hitoshi Kikue, was arrested soon after for conspiring with the left wing Popular Front Movement which sought to prevent the spread of fascism in Japan.

=== Post World War II ===
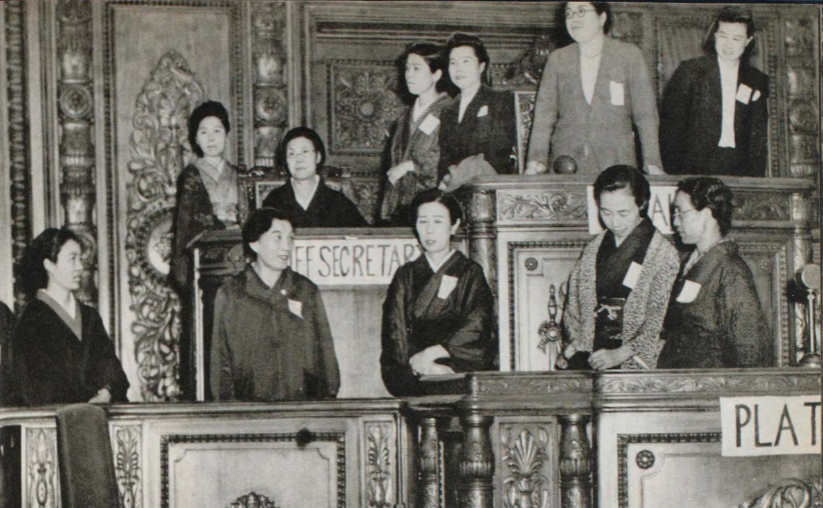
Japan’s first female senators (1946)

Prior to World War II, women in Japan were denied the right to vote and other legal rights. After the surrender of Imperial Japan in 1945, the Allied occupation, on the order of general Douglas MacArthur, began drafting a new constitution for Japan in February 1946. A subcommittee including two women, Beate Sirota Gordon and economist Eleanor Hadley, were enlisted and assigned to writing the section of the constitution devoted to civil rights and women's rights in Japan. They played an integral role, drafting the language regarding legal equality between men and women in Japan, including Articles 14 and 24 on Equal Rights and Women's Civil Rights. Article 14 states, in part: "All of the people are equal under the law and there shall be no discrimination in political, economic or social relations because of creed, sex, social status or family origin". Article 24 includes:

These additions to the constitution were vital to women's rights in Japan. "Japanese women were historically treated like chattel; they were property to be bought and sold on a whim," Gordon said in 1999.

The end of World War II also marked a surge in popularity for the Women's Review (Fujin Kōron) magazine. This magazine featured articles from socialist authors like Yamakawa Kikue calling for equal financial and social rights for not only women, but the lower class in general. Previously, due to the 1893 Publication Law and 1909 Press Law, the Japanese Police Bureau of the Home Ministry was legally allowed to prohibit or fine any publications which encouraged anti-government sentiments. An overwhelming amount of this was found to be leftist and feminist political cartoons. This law was overturned with the imposition of the new Japanese constitution in 1946.

=== Second-wave feminism and birth control activism ===
The fight for reproductive rights in Japanese Feminism can be traced back as early as the 1920s with the work of socialist activist Ishimoto Shizue. Shizue relocated to New York City with her husband and collaborated with American activist Margaret Sanger who was currently advocating for women's reproductive rights in the United States. Both women believed that both the lack of reproductive rights and the wage-labor currently affecting women could be alleviated with the implication of socialism. Birth control had not yet become a solidified concept in Japan, and upon her return in 1921 Shizue had a two-part article regarding birth control education published in Tokyo.

Despite attempts by several leftist groups to popularize it, the topic of birth control and contraception was still considered a heavily taboo topic. This changed with the arrival of Margaret Sanger in April 1922 who was visiting Japan to give a lecture at the request of the Kaizo Publishing Company. This openly sexual lecture brought openness to the previously disapproved concept of women's rights not only with reproduction, but socially, financially, and politically as well. This visit from Sanger causing the resurgence of sexual openness is often referred to as "The Black Ship of Taisho".

Practical applications of birth control were rejected for the most part by the Japanese government. Since this surge of socialist thought and birth control coincidentally occurred in the same year as the 1922 Washington Naval Conference, the Japanese government believed that the United States wished to limit their naval power as well as control their population. Due to this, along with her leftist political ties, Sanger's subsequent lectures were heavily censored by the government.

Mitsu Tanaka was the most visible individual figure in Japan's radical feminist movement during the late 1960s and early 1970s. She wrote a number of pamphlets on feminist topics, the most well-known being Liberation from Toilets. She was a tireless organizer for the women's liberation movement, helping to lead protests, co-founding the Fighting Women's Group of activists, and establishing the first women's centre and women's shelter in Japan during the 1970s. She dropped out of the public feminist movement by the late 1970s.

A multitude of feminist essays and texts were translated and published during the Japanese women's liberation movement in the 1970s.

Another activist to receive much media attention in Japan was Misako Enoki. Enoki was a pharmacist who organized activists to push for the legalization of the birth control pill. Her approach was to generate media attention by forming a protest group called Chupiren, who wore pink motorcycle helmets and took part in publicity stunts such as confronting unfaithful husbands in their offices.

The male-dominated media gave coverage to radical feminists such as Tanaka and Enoki but did not take them seriously. Like Enoki, Tanaka was an activist for birth control, organizing protests to protect women's legal access to abortion procedures. The birth control pill was legalized in Japan in 1999. Abortion in Japan, which is less stigmatized, is frequently used as the alternative. The Japan Family Planning Association, an affiliate of the International Planned Parenthood Federation, was established in 1954.

Matsui Yayori, a women's rights activist, writer, and retired journalist, was a well-known organizer of the "Women's International War Crime Tribunal" in 2000. The panel held a symbolic trial to judge the war crimes committed by Japanese soldiers and officials against the collective victims of the 'comfort women' system that was active during World War II.

=== Later feminism ===
Prominent feminist academics in Japan in recent decades include the sociologist Chizuko Ueno and feminist theorist Yumiko Ehara.

In 2018, Japanese bullfighting organizers lifted a ban on women entering the bullfighting ring.

In 2025, Sanae Takaichi was elected as the first female President of the Liberal Democratic Party, making her the country's first female prime minister. However, many saw Takaichi likely becoming the country's first female prime minister as a "conundrum" for gender equality given Japan's high gender inequality and Takaichi's own policies. The Associated Press wrote that Takaichi "is an ultra-conservative star of a male-dominated party that critics call an obstacle to women's advancement" in a "country that ranks poorly internationally for gender equality". Takaichi's political rise in the LDP was called a "paradox" while some believed that her becoming prime minister would not have an impact on gender inequality given her conservative views.

== Language ==
Women's speech in Japan is often expected to conform with traditional standards of onnarashii (女らしい), the code of proper behavior for a lady. In speech, onnarashii is exhibited by employing an artificially high tone of voice, using polite and deferential forms of speech more frequently than men, and using grammatical forms considered intrinsically feminine. Feminists differ in their responses to gender-based language differences; some find it "unacceptable," while others argue that the history of such gender-based differences is not tied to historical oppression as in the West.

In Japan, marriage law requires that married couples share a surname because they must belong to the same koseki (household). Although it has been possible since 1976 for the husband to join the wife's family under certain circumstances, 98% of the time it is the woman who joins the man's family and therefore changes her surname. Men may take the wife's surname "only when the bride has no brother and the bridegroom is adopted by the bride's parents as the successor of the family."

Feminist groups have introduced legislation that would allow married couples to maintain separate surnames, a practice which in Japanese is referred to as fūfu bessei (夫婦別姓, lit. "husband and wife, different-surname'), but such legislation has not yet been enacted despite "rising criticism".

== Education ==
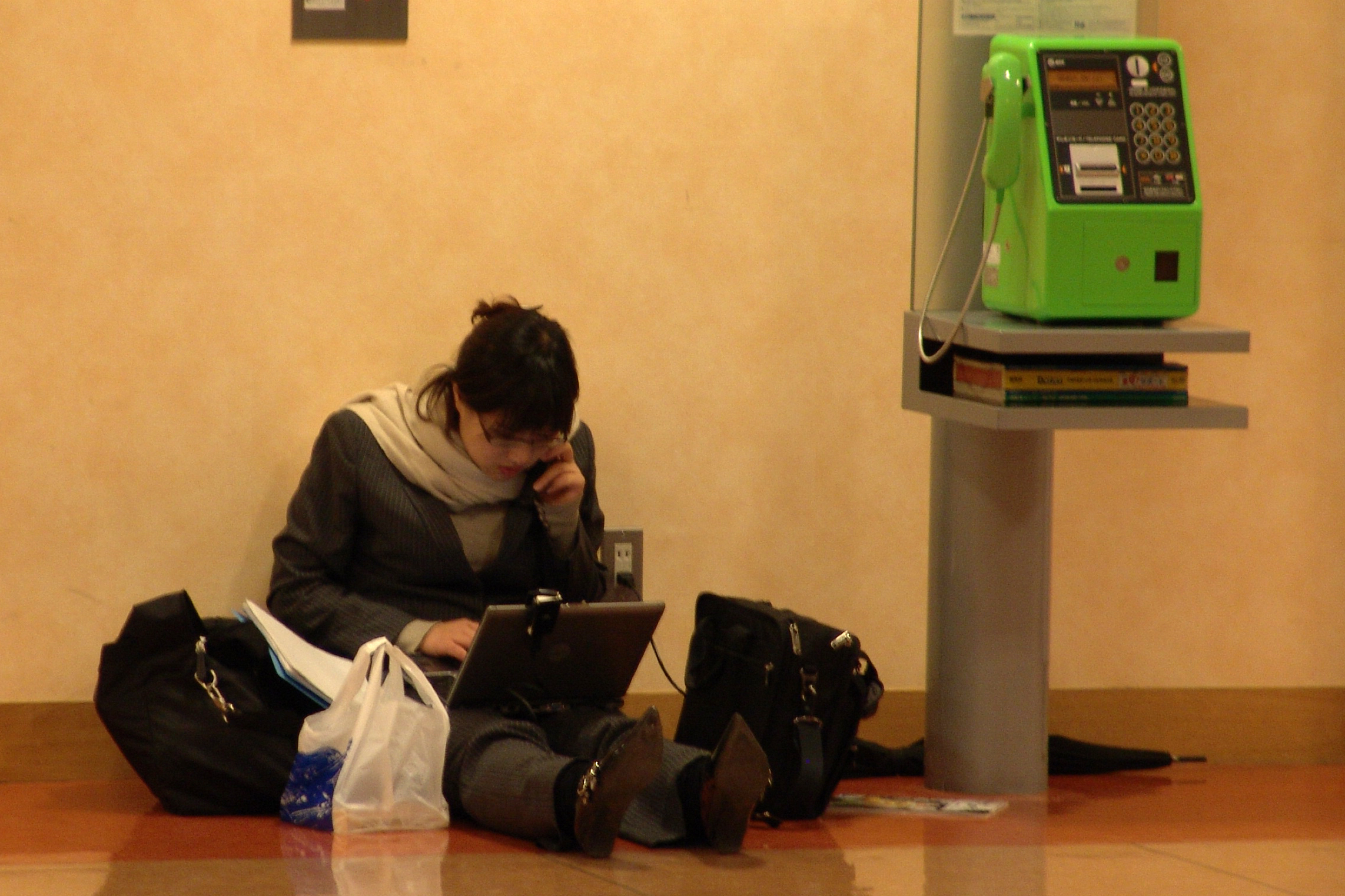
Japanese women are increasingly embracing non-traditional activities and interests such as computer technology.

Although accurate number of literate Tokugawa women may not be known, qualitative evidence such as writings of philosophers advocating for women’s education, writings and publications meant for women, and the existence of local schools (terakoya) and private academies (shijuku) indicate some level of women’s education. Indeed, much of the sentiments regarding women’s education during the Tokugawa period were influenced by Neo-Confucian ideals which emphasized the importance of readying women for domestic abilities after marriage.

A manual widely spread throughout Japan from the Edo period to Meiji period was Onna Daigaku (Great Learning for Women), often attributed to Kaibara Ekken, which aimed to teach women to be good wives and wise mothers. Women were to maintain the strict family system as the basic unit of Japanese society by unconditionally obeying their husbands and their parents-in-law. They were confined to their households and did not exist independent, and were essentially subordinate to their father's or husband's family. There were customary practices to divorce women based on disobedience, jealousy, and even talkativeness. While Onna Daigaku is often cited to indicate the regressive views on women’s education, Kaibara Ekken’s other works, notably Nyoshi o oshiyuru hō (Methods of teaching), shows how he supported that women be well educated as much as men.

During the feudal era, women lucky enough to be educated were instructed by their fathers or brothers. Women of the higher class were discouraged from becoming educated more than women of the lower class. The men in the higher classes enforced social norms more strictly than men in lower classes. This made women of higher class more likely to be bound to the norms.

The Meiji Restoration of 1868 brought about a new era of legal and social reformations, including education being made compulsory for both girls and boys. While the reformers justified that education under the Tokugawa rule was backward, one of the reasons that led to a smoother acceptance of women’s education was due to the already existing positive sentiments towards the idea established previously during the Tokugawa period. Although measures for compulsory schooling seemed hopeful, the lack of infrastructure as well as funding made it realistically difficult for girls to receive the same education as their male counterparts. Additionally, the content of girls’ education came to be linked with the ideology of ‘good wives and wise mothers’ (Ryōsai kenbo) reinforced through state policy and leaders such as Mori Arinori, the Minister for Education, projecting the expectations for women to train themselves with skills that served the nation. This was closely linked with the nation’s wider slogan of ‘wealthy country and strong army’ (Fukoku kyōhei) permeating even to the classrooms, where boys were taught to work hard and become soldiers while girls were supposed to fulfill the duties as a wife and mother, thus perpetuating the patriarchal family system. It was also during this period that a group of five young women were sent to the United States and Europe as part of the Iwakura Mission, out of which Tsuda Umeko went on to establish a women’s college in Tokyo, later known as Tsuda College. Besides, the role of Christian missionaries is worth noting when examining the spread of women’s education in Meiji Japan; since public higher education was still restricted to males, private institutions played a crucial role for women to gain access to education.

== Arts ==
=== Literature ===
One of the earliest modern female writers was Higuchi Ichiyō (1872–1896). After her father died, she lived in poverty, supporting her mother and sister. In 1893, she began to publish her writings in order to earn money. Her novels and stories were critically acclaimed by the literary elite, but they were never a financial success. The family opened a toy and candy shop near Yoshiwara, the geisha quarter of Tokyo. Working in such a district, Ichiyo became more aware of women's conditions. One of her major works, Nigorie [Muddy Waters], portrays unfortunate women forced into becoming geisha due to economic circumstances. The women, no matter what role they took, were despised by society.

Jusanya [Thirteenth Night] is about two families joined by marriage. The woman is of low class and the man, a high-ranking government official. Through marriage families can secure their well-being and it was the only way to move upward in society. The woman sacrifices herself for her family to endure cruel and humiliating taunts from her husband and is unable to protect herself due to social norms. Ichiyo's stories offer no solutions beyond explicitly depicting the conditions of women. According to some, her four-and-a-half-year-long career marks the beginning of Japanese women's self-awareness.

=== Seito magazine ===
Yosano Akiko (1878–1942) is one of the most famous female poets in Meiji period Japan. As the daughter of a rich merchant, Yosano was able to attend school and learned to read and write. Later she became a sponsor of the magazine Seito Bluestocking and also a member of Myojo Bright Star, a poetry journal. In September 1911, Yosano Akiko's poem, "Mountain Moving Day," was published on the first page of the first edition of Seito, a magazine that marked the beginning of the Seitosha movement. Named for literary groups in England known as "bluestocking", its editor Hiratsuka Raicho (1886–1971) was the financial and philosophical might behind the initial spark of the movement. The women of Seito used literary expression to fight Confucian-based thought and improve opportunities for women.

Other women brought other views to the magazine. Okamoto Kanoko (1899–1939) brought a Buddhist view. Her poetry was more concerned with spirituality. According to her, women could find success by not acknowledging the illusions of the world. Without attachment to the world, excluding the patriarchal society, women can find inner strength. Ito Noe (1895–1923) became editor of the magazine after Hiratsuka left due to pleading health issues in 1915. She explored women's rights to abortion, which remained a hot topic until the magazine's end in 1916.

Ito married an anarchist, Osugi Sakae. Both became political prisoners, then were murdered by military police in the aftermath of the Great Earthquake of 1923. Hayashi Fumiko (1904–1951) was the antithesis of Okanmoto Kanto. Hayashi was naturalistic describing life as an experience (Reich, 286). Her stories are about economic survival of women without men. However, the endings return to male society with no solution. She is the next most popular writer after Higuchi Ichiyō.

Seito was controversial as it became more concerned with social problems. Seito introduced the translated version of Ibsen's A Doll's House. The play is about a woman who forges her father's signature to save her husband's life. Instead of being grateful, her husband reacts with anger and disgust. She then decides to leave him.

The government did not like the dissemination of these types of values. Government opposition increased, deeming the content "harmful to the time-honored virtues of Japanese women", and banning five issues of Seito (Raicho, 218). The first issue to be suppressed was a story, "Ikichi" ["Life Blood"] by Tamura Toshiko, about the reminiscences of a woman and a man who spent the night at an inn. Hiratsuka Raicho's issue was banned because it challenged the family system and marriage. Ito Noe's "Shuppon" ["Flight"] is about a woman who left her husband and then her lover betrayed her, another issue that was banned.

=== Manga ===
Manga is an especially popular medium among women writers in Japan; some argue that women use the form to "[deconstruct] traditional outlooks on sex and childbearing."

=== Anime ===
- Magical girl is a subgenre of Japanese fantasy media (including anime, manga, light novels, and live-action media) centered around young girls who possess magical abilities, which they typically use through an ideal alter ego into which they can transform.

== Sexuality ==
=== Prostitution ===
Japanese women's groups began campaigning against institutionalized prostitution in the 1880s, and banded together in 1935 to form the National Purification League (Kokumin Junketsu Dōmei). Early activists tended to express disapproval of the women who were prostitutes, rather than of the men who managed such services, particularly in the widespread military brothel system. Later Japanese feminists expressed concern about the management of sexuality and the reinforcement of racialized hierarchies in the military brothels.

=== Reproductive rights ===
Japanese feminists began to argue in favor of birth control in the 1930s; abortion was allowed by the government in 1948, but only for eugenic purposes. Women who gave birth to many children received awards from the government. The Family Planning Federation of Japan, an affiliate of the International Planned Parenthood Federation, is Japan's main reproductive rights organization, lobbying for the legalization of oral contraceptives and for the continued legality of abortion, and disseminating educational materials on family planning.

== Motherhood ==
Traditionally, women in Japanese society have possessed most power as mothers. Some feminists argue this type of power only upholds a patriarchal system. At least one responds that to the Japanese, to make such a claim is to hold parenting and household duties in relatively low regard:

In any East Asian culture you will find that women have a very tangible power within the household. This is often rejected by non-Asian feminists who argue that it is not real power, but ... Japanese women look at the low status attributed to the domestic labor of housewives in North America and feel that this amounts to a denigration of a fundamental social role—whether it is performed by a man or a woman.

=== "Parasite singles" ===
A growing number of young women are remaining unmarried in Japan today, a development often viewed as a rebellion against the traditional confines of women's restrictive roles as wives and mothers. In 2004, 54% of Japanese women in their 20s were single, as opposed to 30.6% in 1985. Young women are instead living a lifestyle centred on friends and work.

Unmarried Japanese adults typically live with their parents, thus saving on household expenses and increasing the amount of money available to spend on their own entertainment. Sociologist Masahiro Yamada gave these young adults the label "parasitic singles". Some young women reacted by creating business cards with their names and the title "Parasite Single" on them. Japanese media has given heavy coverage to the decline in Japan's birthrate, but the trend continues.

== Labor ==
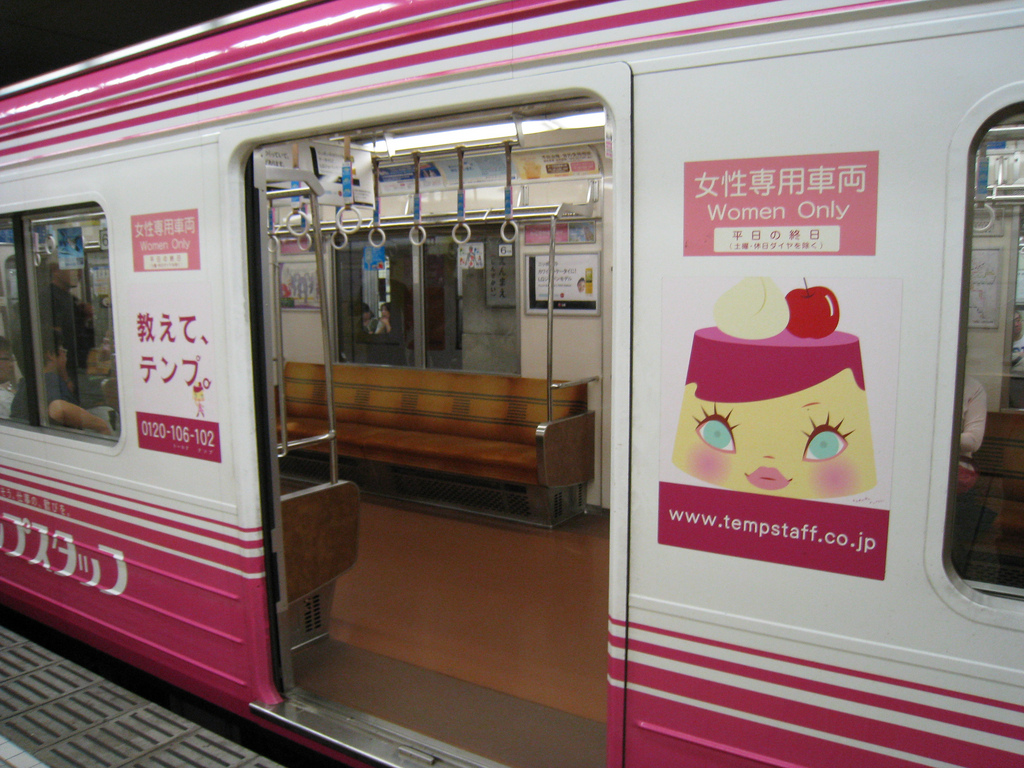
A women-only train car, to protect women from sexual harassment by male passengers.

Unions were legalized in 1946, after MacArthur declared the new law for unions in December 1945. However, unions had little effect on the conditions of women. Unions stayed in the male domain. Throughout most of the century, few women were allowed to hold office, even in unions with primarily female membership, and until at least the 1980s unions often signed contracts that required women workers (but not men) to retire early.

In 1986, the Women's Bureau of the Ministry of Labor enacted an Equal Employment Opportunity Law, the first "gender equality law formulated mainly by Japanese women."

=== Equal Employment Opportunity Law ===
There are no legal provisions prohibiting sexual harassment in Japan. The Equal Employment Opportunity Law merely creates a duty of employers to take measures to prevent sexual harassment. Recourse through the courts for the non-compliance of this duty would have to be done by invoking the clause for damages for tort under the Civil Code, just as it had been done before the adoption of the Equal Employment Opportunity Law.

On April 29, 2013, during the 50th session of the UN Committee on Economic, Social and Cultural Rights, NGOs briefed the Committee which victims of sexual harassment would lose their cases in court because there are no explicit legal provisions prohibiting sexual harassment. On May 17, the Committee published its Concluding Observations including the recommendation:

"The Committee urges the State party to introduce in its legislation an offence of sexual harassment, in particular in the workplace, which carries sanctions proportionate to the severity of the offence. The Committee also recommends that the State party ensure that victims can lodge complaints without fear of retaliation. The Committee recommends that the State party continue to raise public awareness of sexual harassment ."

=== Womenomics ===
Goldman Sachs strategist Kathy Matsui coined the term Womenomics in 1999. It refers to a set of policies implemented in Japan to reduce gender gaps in the labor market. These policies include increasing female labor participation, women's presence in the labor force, and childcare provision. At the start of his administration in 2012, Prime Minister Shinzō Abe announced the implementation of an economic strategy, known as Abenomics, which included a number of policies aimed at increasing sustained female labor participation in Japan. The idea behind the introduction of these policies was that increasing women's presence in the workforce would boost Japan's economic growth.

The motivations for these policy measures were, on one hand, Japan's low female labor participation rate in 2013, relative to other high-income countries: 65% compared to the US (67.2); Germany (72.6); UK (66.4); and France (66.9). On the other hand, increasing female labor participation is expected to increase the fertility rate and alleviate the aging population problem, which is a major concern of the Japanese government. The fertility rate in Japan is now at 1.25, when the rate needed to ensure population replacement is 2.1.

==== Female labor force participation ====
Regarding the female labor participation rate, Prime Minister Abe committed to a goal of 73% by 2020. In order to achieve this, the Japanese government is focusing on women in age groups 30–34 and 35–40, whom studies have shown have a hard time getting back to the labor force after having children and devoting time to childrearing during their late 20s and early 30s. The government's goal of increased labor participation for these specific age groups is of 3.15 million more female workers by 2020. Business organizations such as the Japan Association of Corporate Executives (Keitai Doyukai) and the Japan Business Federation (Keidanren) have expressed their support to the Government's policy with the hope that increasing female labor participation will lead to more adaptability to changes in the global economy.

In 2018, Tokyo Medical University (Japan) had been exposed to prioritizing male applicants to enter the medical school when female applicants had been scoring higher on their entrance exams. For the same year, 9.04 percent of male applicants passed the entrance exam while only 2.91 percent of female applicants were successful. This shows that men were accepted 3.11 times higher than that for women. While men were accepted at a level of 2.02 times higher than that of women in 2018 at the department, the rate was 0.87 times in the following year, meaning that women had been accepted in a higher rate.

With this news as a trigger, other universities such as Juntendo University (Japan) were found to have set different passing levels for male and female applicants and manipulating exam scores for female applicants so they can have more male medical students in their favor. The segregation towards women applicants derived as the school wanted to keep the female population low, from the concern that female applicants have a high possibility to quit their jobs or leave the medical industry after having children or once they start a family in the future.

Although this news was about university administration, this is also an issue for general employees in the workforce as well. In fact, studies by OECD show that more than 70% of Japanese women quit their jobs or stops working for more than a decade and do not come back after giving birth to their first child, whilst it is about 30% in the US.

Japanese women tend to choose between work, or family and the majority of them decide on the family over their careers. This is often due to the inflexibility of the workforce in terms of pay, working hours and lack of the welfare system for people that work but still wants to have a family.

The Japanese government has declared that they will be fining firms if they do not promote women employment and make some efforts in improving the flexibilities of the balance of work and motherhood after women employees give birth. Though the numbers of women employees have been improving in recent years, policy changes and equality in society is still in progress.

==== Women in leadership roles ====
Since the implementation of the Equal Employment Opportunity Law in 1986, the largest increase in female labor participation has been in the sector of part-time jobs. For women who are rejoining the workforce after taking some time off it to raise their children, this means that they disproportionately obtain jobs with lower salaries and precarious contracts. Motivated by this situation and the argument that more diversity in leadership positions leads to better management and more competitiveness, Prime Minister Abe has been encouraging companies and governmental agencies to create alternatives for women's career advancement.

This aspect of Womenomics mainly consists of campaigns and incentives for companies to promote more women to managerial positions, adopt internal gender-inclusiveness quotas, and disclose information regarding the share of female employees in different positions. The goal set for this element of the policy was to achieve 30% of leadership positions for women by 2020, where leadership positions were understood to encompass local and national parliaments; technical specialists; and chief positions in corporations. However, due to insufficient progress, the deadline was shifted in July 2020 to sometime within the decade.

On 31 July 2016, Yuriko Koike became the first female governor of Tokyo. She was re-elected in 2020.

==== Childcare provision ====
There is a shortage of childcare facilities to accommodate at least 23,000 Japanese children who are in waiting lists. In light of this deficit, Prime Minister Abe's Womenomics plan included a goal of zero children in waiting lists. This will be done by a combination of renting childcare facilities, subsidizing childcare businesses, supporting new childcare providers to attain registration, and hiring new childcare workers. The goal set for this aspect of the policy is to provide childcare facilities for 400,000 children by 2017.

==== Criticism of Womenomics ====
There seems to be some international consensus about the effectiveness of promoting female labor participation as a means to increase economic growth. In 2012, the IMF pronounced that a 7% increase in the rate of women in the workforce could lead to a 4% increment in the GDP. However, there are some critical views regarding the likelihood that these policies will significantly increase female labor participation. Some authors point to the prevalent working culture in Japan as a major threat to achieving the set policies' goals. Long working hours and overtime work are a common practice, as is the custom of going out with colleagues after work to drink alcohol. These features of the working culture in Japan can be irreconcilable with family obligations, particularly child rearing.

There is also some skepticism among academics about the expected effect of Womenomics on Japan's fertility rate. Many high-income, democratic countries have faced the challenge of aging populations, and to some extent they have addressed it by implementing social and labor policies that facilitate a balance between work and family duties. But one aspect of the solution that Japan continues to oppose is allowing some degree of immigration influx. It is unclear whether the policies under Womenomics alone will be enough to yield a substantial increase in fertility rates.

Another stream of critiques questions whether Womenomics policies are reinforcing gender labor segregation rather than reforming structural barriers to women's advancement, such as the predominance of the male breadwinner model and women's association with reproductive work.

== See also ==
- Family policy in Japan
- Gender Equality Bureau, Japan
- Kyariaūman, career woman
- List of Japanese feminists
- Overview of gender inequality in Japan
- Women in Japan
- Virtual YouTuber
