= Birth control in Japan =

Birth control in Japan has been available since at least the 17th century, and its evolution has been informed by political, social, and economic contexts. Prior to World War I common forms of birth control included abortion, infanticide, and condoms. Birth control as an oral contraceptive, while known in intellectual circles, was not widely circulated until the interwar period when the debate over birth control gained public support and momentum. However, it was the militarists, whose goal of achieving a strong population in order to establish Japan as an international power prevailed, as Japan prepared to enter World War II. The end of World War II, and Japan's subsequent demilitarization brought an emphasis on population reduction by the US-led occupation SCAP (Supreme Command for the Allied Powers) who were fearful of a rise in communism or militarism which would create a threat to democracy and the "free-world."

Today various types of birth control in Japan are available to women either in drugstores, online, or through visiting a clinic. About 80 percent of married women in Japan prefer condoms as their choice of birth control. Other forms of birth control such as the morning after pill are available only through visitation of a clinic and oral contraceptives, which were legalized in 1999, are not covered by Japanese health insurance. Emergency contraceptive pills were approved by the Ministry of Health, Labour and Welfare of Japan in 2011 and as of February 2026 can be obtained over-the-counter from licensed pharmacists.

== History ==
Infanticide as birth control was common in pre-modern Japan. In the feudal Edo era the common slang for infanticide was mabiki (間引き), which means to pull plants from an overcrowded garden. A typical method in Japan was smothering the baby's mouth and nose with wet paper. It became common as a method of population control. Farmers would often kill their second or third sons. Daughters were usually spared, as they could be married off, sold off as servants or prostitutes, or sent off to become geishas. Mabiki persisted in the 19th century and early 20th century. According to one estimate, at least 97% of homicide victims in Japan in 1900 were newborns. To bear twins was perceived as barbarous and unlucky and efforts were made to hide or kill one or both twins.

After ending a long period as a "closed" country in 1854, Japan began assessing what it meant to be a modern country on the global stage. Noting the strength and power afforded to large militaries, Japan began investing in the quantity and quality of its population as a reserve for its armed forces by encouraging the woman's role in the domestic sphere; however, policies encouraging this were largely ineffective. The creation of Japan's 1880 penal code, and its subsequent revision in 1907, stipulated that the punishment for abortion would be up to one year in prison. “Good Wife, Wise Mother” ideology was also strengthened at this time as the government outlined a woman's civic responsibility as a citizen through their participation in the domestic sphere. These measures, however, did not fully quell Japanese women's resistance and interest in gender relations, and by the end of the 19th century Japanese feminists were evaluating the pros and cons of birth control in different editorials.

The end of World War I ushered in a new wave of the birth control movement resulting from economic instability caused by Japan's economic deflation after the war. Sparked by the visit of Margaret Sanger to Japan in 1922, and through the dissemination of printed information, and the opening of clinics, birth control became widely understood by the general public. Governmental thinking of population as a marker for national power and international strength, however, remained steadfast and led the Japanese government to ban the sale and use of birth control in the 1930s, considering it harmful to the user.

In 1953 the Japanese Ministry of Health and Welfare established the Japan Family Planning Association (JFPA); however, no government funding was provided. By the 1960s Japan's Ministry of Health, Labour and Welfare had begun considering the legalization of birth control pills, but by 1989, they had still not reached a decision. There were concerns that access to birth control pills would reduce condom use, and thereby increase STI rates. There were also concerns about the medication's side effects. In 1999, low dose forms of the pill were approved by the Clinic of Japan Family Planning Association, coinciding with the acceptance of the erectile dysfunction drug Viagra. Emergency contraceptive pills were approved by the Ministry of Health, Labour and Welfare of Japan in 2011; and approved for over-the-counter use in February 2026.

=== Pre-World War I (1854–1914) ===
In an attempt to limit contact between Japan and foreign nationals, Japan closed its ports to all foreign countries except for Chinese and Dutch merchant vessels through the port of Nagasaki. Japan remained a "closed" country until 1854 when United States Naval Commodore Matthew C. Perry docked at Edo Bay and requested a commercial treaty with the Tokugawa shogunate though gunboat diplomacy. As a country closed to foreign nationals for nearly two centuries, Japan was thrust into a chaotic international environment. Realizing their military shortcomings, compared to other countries, Japanese elites in the late Edo period began contemplating ways of strengthening Japan's military; they examined the population for quantity and quality, which were seen as a markers for national power, and encouraged reproduction to grow national strength. Ultimately, the encouragement of reproductive practices proved ineffective at inspiring reproduction and abortion and infanticide became increasingly common. Condemning this behavior as murderous and immoral the government began actively discouraging abortions, began banning signs promoting abortion services, required all pregnancies to be reported, threatened execution for infanticide, and ultimately implemented a ban on all abortions in 1842. It was not until 1880, after the Meiji Restoration and the creation of Japan's first penal code that abortion and infanticide, on the basis of moral and economic reasoning, were declared a crime. In 1907 a revision to the penal code intensified the punishment for abortion with a possible sentence of up to one year in prison. This penal code still exists today. Contraception in Japan was seen by elites in both the Edo and Meiji periods as a weakening of national strength, and encouraged strict regulation of women's reproductive role in society. These regulations became a national policy, fukoku kyohei (enrich the country, strengthen the military), under the Meiji government.

The Meiji government not only pursued military power, it also further restricted gender ideologies. While some women did speak publicly for equal rights in the Freedom and People's Rights Movement (自由民権運動, Jiyū Minken Undō) in the 1880s, the government attempted to silence most suffrage movements with laws like the Political Assembly and Association Law (Shûkai Oyobi Seisha Hô) of 1890 and the Public Peace Police Law (Chian Keisatsu Hô) of 1900. These laws barred women, among others, from joining or attending political associations and meetings. Ideologies such as Good Wife, Wise Mother (良妻賢母, ryōsai-kenbo) were also fortified at this time; it was argued by some that this policy put the health and well-being of women at risk. In 1880 the Japanese government outlined an idealized role for women within the domestic sphere through an education policy that sought to solidify a woman's civic responsibility to the state through domesticity. Western ideals concerning gender relations were not included in women's education in Japan until after the ban on Christianity was lifted and Christian institutions run by missionaries began teaching women about female equality. Despite women's inability to politically participate in society and their subjugation to the domestic sphere and the ie (Japanese family system), which linked sexuality and reproduction to a woman's role as a citizen of the nation-state and therefore overseen by the government, women continued to make their voices heard through newspapers and journals. It was here, thanks in part to their education on gender relations, that women expressed their opinions on female sexuality and a women's role in Japanese society. Journals like Bluestocking (青鞜, Seitō) rigorously debated the pros and cons of birth control in all its forms-abortion, infanticide, abandonment, condoms, oral contraceptives, et cetera. This is where birth control as an oral contraceptive was first introduced. The thinking about the uses and types of birth control were varied: Harada Satsuki supported all forms of birth control, focusing her argument on a woman's right to have control over her body; Itō Noe defended the use of oral contraception or condoms, but not abortion which she considered murder; Yamada Waka rejected all forms of birth control, believing in the protection of the child. While knowledge of abortion, infanticide, and rubber condoms, introduced by Dutch traders in 1867 and later manufactured in Japan in 1909, were well known among the Japanese population, birth control as an oral contraceptive was primarily discussed among intellectual and academic circles, and only began to make its way to the Japanese public after World War I.

=== Interwar Period (1918–1939) ===
Birth control in Japan remained largely out of the public eye until after World War I. As Japan's prosperity grew, resulting from rapid industrialization during the war, so too did rapid inflation, which by 1920 had begun slowing down as Japan entered a phase of deflation that lasted until 1932. As the economy gained momentum, so did the birth rate, and by 1922 Japan was considered to be one of the world's most densely populated countries. Neo-Malthusianism was also gaining prominence at this time which led to laborers and farmers protesting economic instability within Japan. An economic theory introduced by the English, neo-malthusianism theorized that by controlling the size of the population of a country, social revolution due to catastrophes like war, disease, and famine could be avoided. This led to a polarization between groups advocating for and against oral contraception as a form of birth control in Japan. Those against the use of birth control were advocating for the need of a large, strong population that would establish Japan's international power; others saw overpopulation as threatening the peace of the country, which could lead to war. It was against this backdrop that American birth control activist, Margaret Sanger, visited Japan at the invitation of the Kaizo Publishing Company. Sanger was known by some in Japan thanks to previous publications of Sanger's work in kaizō (改造) magazine.

Margaret Sanger's 1922 trip to Japan is considered the catalyst for the Japanese birth control movement. By the 1930s a dissemination of information to the general public had begun through the distribution of pamphlets and the opening of clinics, which numbered around sixty to seventy. Birth Control became especially relevant as Japan braced for the world depression at the end of the 1920s. This resulted in an increase of economic hardship and child abandonment. While some private clinics were successfully opened, clinics associated with municipalities were often vetoed by government officials at the Ministry of Home Affairs. Regardless of a clinic's success there were still barriers that kept clinics from functioning fully as necessary supplies and proper use instruction were hard to obtain, despite availability. Sanger's philosophy on birth control as a neo-Malthusian solution for socioeconomic improvement, women's liberation, and eugenics continued to grow in Japan as groups like the Japanese Birth Control League, which advocated these philosophies, were established. Eugenics in Japan was complemented by maternalism (bosei hogo, protective motherhood) wherein the eugenics ideology of producing quality children led to a recognition of women and mothers through state sponsored support. These views were not universal to all members of the birth control movement and there has been some discourse on the use of eugenics language as a means of tapping into the political climate of Japan, using eugenics as a mechanism to communicate ideas about the use and practice of birth control.

In 1930 a statute issued by the Ministry of Home Affairs barred both the sale of birth control and the dissemination of information on the subject. This was an order that heavily invested in maintaining Japan's national power though population size, emigration, and territorial expansion. Another ordinance issued in 1930 by the Ministry of Home Affairs for the Control of Harmful Contraceptive Appliances banned contraceptive appliances that were considered to cause harm to the individual, such as intrauterine devices. Seven years later in 1937 the government extended this ban to include any written publications on the subject. Even with these statutes and ordinances, there were still movements in Japan to legalize abortion up until 1930, and as late as 1938, ads for birth control were still being published in magazines like Central Review (Chūō Kōron). Despite this resistance from intellectuals and the general public, the birth control movement receded at the start of World War II as militarists marched forward with a goal of achieving a population base of 100 million by 1960 to add to the armed forces reserves and subsequently enhance the national power of Japan on the world stage.

==== Margaret Sanger in Japan ====
Margaret Sanger was seen in Japan as a neo-Malthusian by some, and a women's liberation activist by others who were focused on her fight for women's rights and fundamental desires. Kaizō (改造) magazine first introduced Margaret Sanger's philosophy on Birth Control to a Japanese audience, but it was not until her visit to Japan in 1922 that information about different forms of birth control began circulating among both intellectual circles and the general public in Japan. Despite the Japanese government's efforts to keep Sanger from entering the country, classifying her ideas as "dangerous thoughts," she was able to eventually gain entry in April 1922 by signing an agreement that barred her from publicly speaking about birth control. Regardless of government official's hesitation about Sanger, many of Japan's young elite agreed with Sanger's ideas as a neo-Malthusian solution for reform to address socioeconomic concerns and assisted her in successfully discussing her ideas while in Japan, without explicitly referencing birth control. It is worth noting the simultaneous rejection by the same young Japanese elites of Sanger's idea of women's liberation, or voluntary motherhood through birth control which she closely linked with neo-Malthusian ideas and the potential for racial improvement, or eugenics. After a notable disappointment at Sanger's first public speech, caused by her unwillingness to directly discuss the more practical aspects of birth control, and fearing retaliation from the authorities the Kaizō Publishing Group cancelled all of Sanger's remaining talks, but her effect on the Japanese populations interest in birth control was palpable and the birth control movement was well underway.

=== Post World War II (1945–2000) ===
The end of World War II and Japan's demilitarization led to an examination of the need for a large, strong population as a means of establishing Japan's international power. In December 1945 the idea of birth control as a way to alleviate overpopulation was re-considered in the House of Peers. In 1946 a plan which called for voluntary birth control and mandatory sterilization for sex criminals and individuals with infectious diseases was drawn up by the newly formed advisory council on population policy (shingikai); this plan was not enacted. Despite there being differing opinions within the government for and against the use of birth control, the ban on the dissemination of information on the topic began to subside and popular interest began to rise once again. Journal articles and books the likes of Freedom to Control Pregnancy (Tokyo, 1948) by Satouchi Akatsu and The Control of Pregnancy Among Workers (Tokyo, 1948) by Myoji Suzuki became accessible beyond intellectual circles. The later contained an introduction written by the Secretary General of the Japanese Communist Party, Kyuichi Tokuda, which emphasized the interest in birth control not just among the Japanese civilian population. Reasons for wanting birth control in Japan were varied. For the Japanese Communist Party birth control was only necessary until such a time that a fully functioning democratic peoples government could be established, creating conditions under which birth control was no longer needed. Despite this, it was political and economic interests as well as reverse selection that were the most widely discussed as reasons for approving the use of birth control in Japan; putting the health of the nation above that of the individual. At the same time the US-led occupation SCAP (Supreme Command for the Allied Powers) began to fear that without quelling the population growth in Japan, which had increased by 11 million between 1945 and 1950, there would be a rise of communism or militarism, which was largely considered a threat to democracy and the "free world." Therefore, in order to facilitate an economic recovery of Japan it was deemed necessary to shrink the population.

After the war, SCAP began promoting birth control programs with what became known as a "benevolent neutrality" that was seen as a hands off approach, but in fact acted as a guiding force, targeting population reduction through policies, laws, and programs. Japan soon realized that their independence was contingent on their ability to restore their economy and shrink their population, so in 1947 birth control representatives began to take the first steps toward legislating birth control measures, including physician-sponsored birth control. Despite this, the 1948 Eugenics Protection Bill passed without any birth control provisions; hesitancy over eugenics, as concerns of overpopulation outweighed those of eugenics. In 1949, a revision passed which provided abortion in the case of extreme physical or economic distress to the mother. A further stipulation was added in 1952 requiring that the mother meet an economic threshold of poor living conditions to obtain an abortion. The Pharmaceutical Law, also passed in 1949, increased the list of contraceptives, excluding the pill, that could be produced, advertised, and sold in Japan. In 1999, low dose forms of the pill were approved by the Clinic of Japan Family Planning Association, coinciding with the acceptance of the erectile dysfunction drug Viagra. Emergency contraceptive pills were approved by the Ministry of Health, Labour and Welfare of Japan in 2011; initially they required a prescription from a doctor, but as from February 2026, they are available over-the-counter from licensed pharmacists.
