= Ayako Kano =

Japanese scholar

Ayako Kano (加野彩子, Kano Ayako) is a Japanese academic specializing on the intersection of gender, performance, and politics. She is an expert on Japanese feminism. Kano has worked at the University of Pennsylvania since 1995 and was named the R. Jean Brownlee Endowed Term Professor of East Asian Languages and Civilizations in 2026.

== Life ==
Kano graduated from Keio University. She completed a master's degree and Ph.D. at Cornell University.

Kano joined the faculty of University of Pennsylvania in 1995. She is a professor in the East Asian languages and civilizations department. Her academic focus is the intersection of gender, performance, and politics. She researches the cultural history of Japan and specializes in Japanese feminism. In 2025, she was name director of the Wolf Humanities Center. In 2026, Kano became the R. Jean Brownlee Endowed Term Professor of East Asian Languages and Civilizations.

== Selected works ==
- Kano, A. (2001). Acting like a Woman in Modern Japan: Theater, Gender and Nationalism. Palgrave Macmillan US. ISBN 978-0-312-23997-8.
- Kano, Ayako (2016). Japanese Feminist Debates: A Century of Contention on Sex, Love, and Labor. University of Hawaii Press. ISBN 978-0-8248-5583-3.
