= Facing Two Ways =

Book by Shidzue Ishimoto

- Title page for Facing Two Ways: The Story of My Life (1935)
- Author: Baroness Shidzué Ishimoto
- Genre: Memoir
- Publisher: Farrar & Rinehart; Stanford University Press
- Publication date: 1935

Facing Two Ways: The Story of My Life is a memoir by Baroness Shidzué Ishimoto (later Shidzue Katō) published in 1935 by Farrar & Rinehart with a second edition published by Stanford University Press in 1984 with an introduction and afterword by Barbara Molony.

John Chamberlain of The New York Times wrote in a 1935 article that "It is as if some not at all comic Mack Sennett had undertaken the direction of Western history, disguising his real plot with Japanese names, and driving home point after point by foreshortening everything." He argued a reader from a Western country would feel "an odd and wholly startling effect of time telescoped".

== Contents ==
Within the initial release, Chapters 1-9 discuss Japanese domestic life. Other content includes the Bolshevik revolution's impact on Japan and dissolution of said impact, how the political and social views of Baron Keikichi Ishimoto, the author's husband, changed, as well as discussions on feminism in Japan.

The Molony content in the 1984 Stanford edition discusses Katō's subsequent life, and her conflicts with other Japanese feminists.

== Release ==
The first edition was published in 1934 by Farrar & Rhinehart in the United States. A portion of the book discussing Ishimoto's upbringing was published as a standalone work, East Way, West Way: A Modern Japanese Girlhood as American readers indicated that they enjoyed reading that section.

In the 1930s the book was published in Sweden and the United Kingdom. A Japanese version did not come out during the 1930s; Molony said that the Japanese government would have suppressed a work that had an anti-war philosophy. The second English edition was published by Stanford University Press in 1984 with the introduction and afterword by Molony.

== Reception ==
Takie Sugiyama Lebra of the University of Hawaii noted that the 1935 edition was "widely read by Americans." Lebra herself stated that the 1934 edition had "a message of timeless quality" despite being around fifty years old and that the Stanford edition's content by Molony "helps us to read the book in proper perspective". Lebra praised the interweaving of content about Japanese culture and life with Ishimoto's life.

Chieko Irie Mulhern of the University of Illinois stated that the original American edition "was valuable and revealing enough" and that the 1984 Stanford edition "provides the more powerful impact" with Molony's content being concise yet thorough. Mulhern stated that Japanese people should read the book.

In regards to the 1934 edition Payson J. Treat of Stanford University wrote that the work is "fascinating", "charming", and "thought-compelling".

In regards to the 1934 edition Beatrice Webb wrote in Pacific Affairs that it is "a remarkable book", with the first section being her favorite as it was the "most intimate, [sic] account" she had encountered.

== See also ==
- A New Woman of Japan - A 1996 biography of Ishimoto/Katō by Helen M. Hopper
