= Misako Enoki =

Japanese feminist, pharmacist, and politician

Misako Enoki (榎 美沙子, Enoki Misako; born 23 January 1945) is a Japanese feminist, pharmacist, and politician. She helped launch and became a symbol of the feminist movement in Japan when she organized activists to push for the legalization of the birth control pill.

As a sign of respect for her elderly parents, Enoki was compelled to marry at the age of 24. She married physician Natsuo Kiuchi, retaining her maiden name. Enoki began her involvement with the Japanese women's liberation translation group known as Wolf Group (Urufu no Kai). She distributed a pamphlet calling for the legalization of the birth control pill, initially using the group's name, angering group members who did not share her position.

Enoki attended the Ribu Conference of May 1972, recruiting women to form a protest group called Chūpiren ([ja: 中ピ連]; sometimes known as Pink Panthers or pink helmets) as a radical wing of the Japanese feminist movement. Chūpiren was an abbreviation for Chūzetsu Kinshi Hō ni Hantai Shi Piru Kaikin o Yōkyū Suru Josei Kaihō Rengō (Women's Liberation Federation for Opposing the Abortion Prohibition Law and Lifting the Pill Ban). The group organized well-attended demonstrations for a series of campaigns addressing the concerns of women. Chūpiren was concerned with legal rights in divorce and marriage, access to birth control, abortion, and equal pay. Wearing pink hard hats to ensure maximal media attention, the demonstrators marched in white military-style uniforms. They held protest rallies and sit-ins and took part in publicity stunts such as confronting unfaithful husbands in their offices. The male-dominated media gave coverage to Chūpiren but did not take them seriously, instead ridiculing the movement.

Enoki debated with Japanese feminist Mitsu Tanaka, who did not think that Chūpiren could be considered part of uuman ribu, the Japanese women's liberation movement. Enoki was not well trusted in the ribu and members of Chūpiren were critical of her style of leadership.

Enoki formed the Japan Woman's Party (Nihon Joseitō) for the 1977 House of Councillors election. The party put forward 10 to 12 candidates in the election and fared poorly, receiving only 0.4 per cent of the popular vote. Following the election, Chūpiren was disbanded and Enoki left public life.

Enoki's husband lent her $38,000 to help finance the 1977 political campaign of the Japan Women's Party. They struck a bargain where she would resume housework at their apartment in suburban Tokyo and he would write off $2,670 of the loan for each month of housework.
