= Mitsu Tanaka =

Japanese feminist and writer (1943–2024)

Mitsu Tanaka (田中美津, Tanaka Mitsu; 1943 – August 7, 2024) was a Japanese feminist and writer, who became well known as a radical activist during the early 1970s.

== Early life ==
Tanaka was born in 1943 as the third daughter of a fishmonger called Uogiku in front of Kisshō-ji, Tokyo. At birth, she suffered from oxygen deprivation, leading to her becoming a frail child with whooping cough who often missed school. She was raised by her parents, who had no academic background and had never graduated from an ordinary high school. As a second grader still in elementary school, she was subjected to child sexual abuse at the hands of an employee from the family business. Spurred into action by this from an early age, ''discrimination against women'' and the ''frailness of the body'' would become the touchstone of her later writings. After her parents decided to rearrange their business and open a Japanese restaurant, their family fortunes started to increase, and Tanaka finally graduated from high school while deciding to search for her own way of life instead of going to college. After a young Vietnamese man living in the neighborhood came to pick up a donation, she decided to participate in a relief activity for orphans stricken by the Vietnam War, which led to the formation of a civic group called "Anti-war Akanbe". She also participated in the Latin Quarter struggle, related to the Zenkyōtō student protests and other civic movements of the time. At that time Tanaka was first impressed by Wilhelm Reich's Die Sexualität im Kulturkampf, leading her to state:

If you have a negative view of sex, you will become a person who appreciates authority, is afraid of their own desires, and has no spontaneity. The world will end up with people who are easy to manage.

== Feminist activism ==
During the early 1970s, Tanaka was a leading activist for feminism in her native Japan, where the women's liberation movement was called uuman ribu. She helped establish a group of activists known as the Guruupu Tatakau Onnatachi (Fighting Women Group), who staged many public protests that gained a great deal of media attention in Japan. The most extensive and thorough analysis of Tanaka and her role in the liberation movement, elaborated in Scream from the Shadows, by Setsu Shigematsu argues that Group of Fighting Women were akin to (but in some ways differed from) radical feminist groups in the US. They forwarded a comprehensive critique of the political, economic, social and cultural systems of modern Japan due to their patriarchal and capitalist nature. A core element of their critique of Japan's male dominated society focused on the need for the liberation of sex (sei no kaihō), with an emphasis on the need for women's liberation (onna no kaihō) from the Japanese male-centered family system. The group engaged in a variety of feminist campaigns and direct actions.

One of the group's largest campaigns was to protect women's access to abortion procedures in Japan. Tanaka's views on abortion became well publicized and controversial:

She believes that an abortion is murder and that women who have gone through an abortion are, therefore, murderers. Starting from this admission of 'evil' in women's own doing, Mitsu Tanaka then shed light on and condemned the societal structure that forced women to become killers. Morioka calls this line of thinking "tracing back from evil."

Other Japanese feminists protested in favour of legalization of the birth control pill during the same era. However, the birth control pill was not legalized in Japan until 1999, and women still frequently rely upon abortion as the alternative in Japan today.

Tanaka led a women's liberation rally (ribu taikai) in 1971, and another in 1972. These protests drew hundreds of women supporters. She worked together with many feminist activists (such as Tomoko Yonezu, Sachi Sayama, Setsuko Mori) to establish the first women's centre and women's shelter in Japan, the Ribu Sentā, in Shinjuku, Tokyo, in 1972 (it closed in 1977). Yet despite Tanaka's efforts, and the publicity her protests received in Japanese media, the male-dominated media did not take her seriously. As was the case in the United States, some media helped disseminate the message of the movement, but the majority of the male-dominated media mocked the movement's transgressive actions. Some may argue that Japan's feminist movement lacked the prominent leaders that the feminist movement in the United States had in the media (such as Betty Friedan, Gloria Steinem, Susan Sontag, and so on), but the most significant difference of the women's liberation movement in Japan, compared with that of liberal feminism (in the U.S. and Japan), is that it did not seek equality with men as their goal. They regarded men as also oppressed by the system, and argued that they also need to be liberated. Feminist activism in Japan remains on the margins of society today, but was more strongly marginalized during the years of Tanaka's activism.

== Writing ==
Tanaka's first well-known publication was a pamphlet distributed at a rally in 1970, titled Liberation from Eros (Erosu Kaihō Sengen). In this pamphlet, Tanaka called for a break from the Japanese feminist tradition of working for equal economic rights from within conventional social systems:

We women are originally spiritual beings, and at the same time we are also sexual beings. And yet, through the consciousness of man, we have been torn apart into a mother (an object that gives birth to a child) and a toilet (an object that is convenient for the fullfilment of sexual urges). Yes, the order under the private property system was maintained by suppressing women in this way. [...] Thus as for our liberation as women, it must be a liberation of eros, which means a reform of our stream of consciousness that denies our sex...and we direct our movement towards the dismantling of the ie (household system). [...] As we continue to thoroughly question ourselves, in the mist of the struggle, we who can be none other than onna. By questioning men and authority, we will deconstruct our own fantasies of love, husband and wife, men, chastity, children, the home, and maternal love. As we design our own subjective formation, we would like to aid in the (re)formation of men's subjectivity.

Tanaka's Fighting Women Group published a newsletter in addition to organizing protests. Tanaka was a prolific writer during the early 1970s, producing many pamphlets and essays for the movement. In 1970, she wrote a pamphlet that addressed women's need to change the way they regarded their role in sexual relationships and procreation. It was called Why 'Sex Liberation' - Raising the Problem of Women's Liberation. Tanaka then published a feminist manifesto called Benjo Kara no Kaiho (Liberation from the Toilet) in 1970 that is arguably the most famous manifesto of the movement. This accused leftist men in social justice movements of regarding women as little more than repositories of men's bodily fluids. Tanaka published her best-selling autobiography, Inochi no Onna-tachie: Torimidashi uman ribu ron (For My Spiritual Sisters: A Disorderly Theory of Women's Liberation) in 1972, an account of her personal experiences with misogynist exploitation, including rape and discrimination in employment. This book also includes her critique of the Japanese New Left for its masculinist politics and she reflects on the violence of the United Red Army internal purge.

== Departure from public activism ==
Tanaka, exhausted from her participation in liberal movements, left public activism after 1975. She left Japan for Mexico where she attended the International Women's Year World Congress and lived for 4 years and 3 months. Meanwhile, she gave birth to a son out of wedlock with a Mexican. Later, she worked as an acupuncturist, considering her "liberation activism" to be personal in nature, rather than public. She has stated that she preferred to "stand by" people rather than leading. She has also expressed the view that earlier feminism attracted followers because it enabled them to express themselves, but because feminists of her generation were not taken seriously by men, they turned to dealing with men on men's terms, adopting a masculine "academic" approach and using "jargon", which drove many women away from the movement.

Tanaka died on August 7, 2024, at the age of 81.

== See also ==
- Abortion in Japan
- Feminism in Japan
- Japan Family Planning Association
- Women's suffrage in Japan

== Academic paper ==
- Feminism, Disability, and Brain Death: Alternative Voices from Japanese Bioethics PDF
