= A New Woman of Japan =

1996 book about Shidzue Katō

A New Woman of Japan: A Political Biography of Katō Shidzue
- Author: Helen M. Hopper
- Language: English
- Subject: Shidzue Katō
- Genre: Biography
- Publisher: Westview Press
- Publication date: 1996
- Publication place: United States

A New Woman of Japan: A Political Biography of Katō Shidzue is a 1996 book about Shidzue Katō by Helen M. Hopper, published by Westview Press.

Barbara Molony of Santa Clara University described it as the first "critical biography" of Katō, and that the work "captured the importance of" Katō's relationships.

Hopper argued that Katō focused on birth control and did not write a lot about theory, instead directly focusing on activism; she argued that those factors meant that Katō got relatively less attention. Hopper noted that Katō had created many publications, but publications by other Japanese feminists rarely referred to her. The work also takes note of her relationship with Kanjū Katō.

Lori Williamson in "Women's History and Biography" stated that the book explored a hypocritical stance regarding racial integration in which Katō criticized her stepdaughter for trying to have a liaison with an American soldier.

== Background ==
Much of the material used for research came from the United States, including archives and scholarly literature. Molony stated that the heavy use of American material meant that the work emphasizes Katō's ties with Americans more than ties with other Japanese. Janet Goff of Pacific Affairs wrote that the work is "The culmination of long effort unearthing primary sources".

== Reception ==
Joyce Gelb of the City University of New York described the book as "an important personal, historical, and political biography of an extraordinary woman". Gelb stated that the book does not explain why Katō had a conflict with Fusae Ichikawa.

Goff wrote that the work does not have "a sustained overview" of the subject and therefore fails to keep "the thread of the discussion", and she concluded that the work is "ultimately unsatisfying as social history".

Linda L. Johnson of Concordia College wrote that the book is "cogent", "well-researched", and "fascinatingly detailed". Johnson criticized the lack of an "analytical framework".

Molony concluded that it was "a welcome addition" to the field, stating that the work had nuance and was not a "hagiography". Molony argued that the work should have been better proofread as there were "astoundingly large" amounts of errors in typing.

E. Patricia Tsurumi of the University of Victoria in Canada described it as a "welcome" work. She stated that the work made Katō appear she had anti-war views when this wasn't the case, and that she did not have concern over the victims of Japanese colonialism during the war like she did with fellow Japanese.

C. L. Yates of Choice: Current Reviews for Academic Libraries wrote that it had an "engrossing and ably told" narrative about the subject's life, but that it lacked "a rigorous analytical and critical treatment of central issues" and in portions a ""gee whiz" tone to the narrative voice" that is "distracting".

== See also ==
- Facing Two Ways - Katō's memoir (first published while she was Baroness Shidzué Ishimoto)
