= Yumi Suzuki (plaintiff) =

Japanese activist

- 鈴木由美
- Born: 1956 (age 69–70)
- Awards: BBC 100 Women (2024)

Yumi Suzuki (鈴木由美 born 1956) is a Japanese human rights activist. Born with cerebral palsy, she was one of the plaintiffs in a lawsuit over Japan’s former Eugenic Protection Law, which authorised forced sterilisation. In 2024, she was selected as one of the BBC's 100 Women.

== Biography ==
Suzuki was born with cerebral palsy and has lived since birth using a bed or wheelchair for daily life.

In 1968, at the age of 12, she was subjected to a forced hysterectomy under Japan's Eugenic Protection Law. The law allowed sterilisation without consent to prevent the birth of what it termed "inferior offspring". Between 1948 and 1996, when the law was in effect, around 25,000 people with disabilities were subjected to forced sterilisation under this policy.

Following the surgery, she suffered aftereffects such as convulsions caused by fear when recalling the operation, and was bedridden for about twenty years. In her forties, she began living independently. At age 42, in 1998, she married a man who had been her care assistant, though the marriage later ended in divorce.

On 27 February 2019, at age 63, she filed a lawsuit at the Kobe District Court seeking state compensation for the forced sterilisation. On 3 August 2021, the court dismissed her claim, ruling that the 20-year statute of repose had expired.

Suzuki appealed the decision, and on 23 March 2023, the Osaka High Court overturned the lower court's ruling, recognising that the state had promoted discriminatory policies that deepened social prejudice, thereby making it unjust to apply the statute of repose.

The court also pointed out that the former law unconstitutional, stating that it "deprived individuals of the opportunity to decide whether to bear and raise children, and its legislative purpose was extremely inhumane."

On April 5, 2024, the government appealed the ruling to the Supreme Court. On 3 July 2024, the Supreme Court of Japan affirmed the unconstitutionality of the former Eugenic Protection Law and ordered the government to pay damages to the plaintiffs.

"I [have] faced discrimination from when I was small, but his was very different," said Suzuki. "It broke my heart. I don't want money. I want people to know what happened to us. To make sure it never happens again. I want disabled people to be treated equally. We are not things. We are human beings."

In December 2024, Suzuki was selected by the BBC as one of the 100 Women in the Politics and Advocacy category.
