= International Journal of Japanese Sociology =

- Discipline: Sociology
- Language: English
- Edited by: Daisaburo Hashizume, Kiyoshi Adachi

Publication details
- History: 1992-present
- Publisher: Wiley-Blackwell on behalf of the Japan Sociological Society
- Frequency: Annual

Standard abbreviations
- ISO 4: Int. J. Jpn. Sociol.

Indexing
- ISSN: 0918-7545 (print); 1475-6781 (web)
- OCLC no.: 29644489

Links
- Journal homepage; Online access; Online archive

The International Journal of Japanese Sociology is an annual peer-reviewed academic journal published by Wiley-Blackwell on behalf of the Japan Sociological Society. The journal was established in 1992 and covers sociological topics as they relate to Japan, including policy, community, family, law, and class in urban and rural environments.
