= Yumiko Ehara =

Japanese sociologist

Yumiko Ehara (Japanese: 江原 由美子, Hepburn: Ehara Yumiko; born October 29, 1952) is a Japanese sociologist. Her areas of expertise include women's studies, gender studies, and theoretical sociology. As one of Japan's leading feminists, she has made significant contributions to feminist theory in Japan.

== Education ==
Ehara graduated from the University of Tokyo with a Bachelor of Arts in 1975 and later withdrew from the doctoral program in sociology at the same university's Graduate School of Sociology in 1979. In 2002, she was awarded a Ph.D. in sociology by dissertation from the University of Tokyo.

== Career and research ==
Her academic career began in 1979 as an assistant in the Faculty of Humanities at Tokyo Metropolitan University (1949–2011). She became a full-time lecturer at the Faculty of Letters and Education at Ochanomizu University in 1982 and was promoted to associate professor in 1986. Ehara returned to Tokyo Metropolitan University in 1992 as an associate professor in the Faculty of Humanities, becoming a full professor in 2001. Following the university's reorganization, she became a professor in the Faculty of Urban Liberal Arts at the new Tokyo Metropolitan University in April 2005. She also served as vice president of the university from May 2009 to March 2015. After her retirement in March 2017, she was appointed professor emerita. In April 2017, she became a professor at Yokohama National University. Since fiscal year 2022, she has been a special researcher at the Institute of Human Life and Culture at Otsuma Women's University.

In the 1980s, early in her career, Ehara conducted research on the phenomenological sociology of Alfred Schutz. Her essay published during the same period, "The Logic of Discrimination and Its Critique," has been described as a "classic paper in the discourse on discrimination in the Japanese-speaking world."

In the 1990s, she became known as a leading critic of Chizuko Ueno from a radical feminist perspective during the "culture vs. material" debate over Marxist feminism, which was sparked by the publication of Ueno's Patriarchy and Capitalism.

In her 2001 book Gender Order (Jendā Chitsujo), Ehara developed a model of the gender order to explain the reproduction of sexual domination, critically drawing upon ethnomethodology, Anthony Giddens' structuration theory, Pierre Bourdieu's theory of habitus, and Raewyn Connell's work in gender studies. Gender Order is considered the culmination of her theoretical work.

During this period, she significantly influenced a younger generation of researchers by editing several collections of essays on controversial topics, such as the Claims of Feminism series, and by serving as the editor for the Feminism in Japan and New Edition: Feminism in Japan series, which provided an overview of feminism in Japan.

== Activities ==
Ehara has served as a director of the Japan Sociological Society and as a member of the Science Council of Japan for its 19th through 21st terms. She has also held positions as the president of the Kanagawa Human Rights Center and chairperson of the Tama City Council for the Promotion of a Gender-Equal Society.

== Works ==
=== Singly-authored books ===
- Seikatsu Sekai no Shakaigaku (The Sociology of the Life-World) (Keiso Shobo, 1985; On-demand ed., 2016)
- Josei Kaihō to iu Shisō (The Idea of Women's Liberation) (Keiso Shobo, 1985; On-demand ed., 2016; Expanded ed., Chikuma Gakugei Bunko, 2021)
- Feminizumu to Kenryoku Sayō (Feminism and the Workings of Power) (Keiso Shobo, 1988; On-demand ed., 2016)
- Radikaru Feminizumu Saikō (The Revival of Radical Feminism) (Keiso Shobo, 1991; On-demand ed., 2013)
- Sōchi to shite no Sei Shihai (Sexual Domination as an Apparatus) (Keiso Shobo, 1995)
- Feminizumu no Paradokkusu: Teichaku ni yoru Kakusan (The Paradox of Feminism: Diffusion through Establishment) (Keiso Shobo, 2000)
- Jendā Chitsujo (Gender Order) (Keiso Shobo, 2001; New ed., 2021)
- Jiko Ketteiken to Jendā (The Right to Self-Determination and Gender) (Iwanami Shoten, 2002; Iwanami Jinbun Selection, 2012)
- Jizoku suru Feminizumu no tame ni: Gurōbarizēshon to 'Dai-ni no Kindai' o Ikinuku Riron e (For a Sustainable Feminism: Toward a Theory for Surviving Globalization and the "Second Modernity") (Yuhikaku, 2022)

=== English articles ===
- Ehara, Yumiko, (1993), “Japanese Feminism in the 1970s and 1980s”, U.S.-Japan Women's Journal. English Supplement, 4: pp. 49–69.
- (2000), “Feminism's growing pains”, Japan Quarterly, 47(3): pp. 41–48.
- (2000), “The Politics of Teasing”, Edited by Richard Calichman, Contemporary Japanese Thought, Columbia University Press, pp. 43–70.
- (2005), “Feminism in the Grips of a Pincer Attack—Traditionalism, liberalism, and globalism”, Japanese Journal of Sociology, 14(1): pp. 6–14.
- (2013), “Japanese Feminist Social Theory and Gender Equality”, Edited By Anthony Elliott, Masataka Katagiri, Atsushi Sawai, Routledge Companion to Contemporary Japanese Social Theory, Routledge, pp. 162–176.
- (2013), “Gender Studies in Sociology in Post-war Japan”, Japanese Journal of Sociology, 22(1): pp. 94–103.
