= Japan Sociological Society =

Academic society in Japan

- Formation: 1924
- Headquarters: Tokyo
- Members: 3,600 full members
- 2024 President: Yoshimichi Sato
- Website: jss-sociology.org

The Japan Sociological Society (JSS) is an academic organization of sociologists in Japan. Founded in 1924, the Japan Sociological Society is recognized as a cooperating academic research organization by the Science Council of Japan. The JSS currently has approximately 3,600 full members, making it the largest academic society in the field of sociology in Japan.

== Publications ==
JSS has also been publishing Japanese Sociological Review on a quarterly basis as its journal since 1950 after having published Journal of Sociology (1924 to 1930), Sociology Quarterly (1931 to 1932), The Annual Review of Sociology (1933 to 1943), and Sociological Studies (1944, 1947 to 1949). The Japanese Sociological Review is one of the leading sociology journals in Japan. In addition, to promote international dissemination of research, the International Journal of Japanese Sociology (IJJS) is published annually.

== Awards ==
The JSS Encouraging Award was established to honor promising research achievements by JSS members. The award has categories for articles and books. Notable past recipients include scholars such as Eiji Oguma and Norihiro Nihei.
