= Eugenics in Japan =

Eugenics has influenced political, public health and social movements in Japan since the late 19th and early 20th century. Originally brought to Japan through the United States (like Charles Davenport and John Coulter), through Mendelian inheritance by way of German influences, and French Lamarckian eugenic written studies of the late 19th and early 20th centuries. Eugenics as a science was hotly debated at the beginning of the 20th, in Jinsei-Der Mensch, the first eugenics journal in the Empire. As the Japanese sought to close ranks with the West, this practice was adopted wholesale, along with colonialism and its justifications.

The concept of pureblood as a criterion for the uniqueness of the Yamato people began circulating around 1880 in Japan, while eugenics in the sense of instrumental and selective procreation, clustered around two positions concerning blood, the pure blood (純血, junketsu) and the mixed blood (混血, konketsu).

Popularity of the pure-blood eugenics theory came from a homegrown racial purity or monoculture national belief that has been part of Japanese society since ancient times. The local movement was however less focused on modern scientific ideals and more on the "outside person" vs the "native or inside person" and blood purity.

Later legal measures were supported by certain politicians and movements that sought to increase the number of healthy pure Japanese, while simultaneously decreasing the number of people suffering mental retardation, disability, genetic disease and other conditions that led to them being viewed as "inferior" contributions to the Japanese gene pool.

Opposition to the eugenics movement persisted amongst several right-wing factions, including members of the Diet of Japan and obstetricians, who perceived eugenics as suggesting that the Japanese people were only animals, not inhabitants of the "country of the kami" (神国, shinkoku) as believed by the Japanese national Shinto tradition. Yoshiichi Sōwa (曽和義弌), author of "Japan's Shinto Revolution", wrote in 1940, "When we look up into the past, the people of our country are descended from the kami. Are they claiming we must sterilize these people?"

== Origins of Japanese domestic scientific eugenics ==
Yamanouchi Shige (1876–1973), a plant cytologist, was one of the early and important members of the Japanese eugenics movement, who was trained under John Merle Coulter (1851–1928) an American eugenicist and botanist. He was a major promoter and academic of early Lamarckian theory, but later blended his ideas with Mendelian evolutionary theory.

His career is a direct link between United States and Japanese eugenics. His approach has been credited with searching for a way for the Japanese race to genetically surpass what was then the "dominant Western race" of the 19th and early 20th centuries by breeding smarter and stronger Japanese people.

According to Jennifer Robertson of the University of Michigan, eugenism, as part of the new scientific order, was introduced in Japan "under the aegis of nationalism and empire building." She identifies "positive eugenism" and "negative eugenism." Positive eugenism, promoted by Ikeda Shigenori, refers to "the improvement of circumstances of sexual reproduction and thus incorporates advances in sanitation, nutrition and physical education into strategies to shape the reproductive choices and decisions of individual and families" Negative Eugenism, promoted by Hisomu Nagai, "involves the prevention of sexual reproduction, through induced abortion or sterilization among people deemed unfit". "Unfit" included people such as alcoholics, lepers, the mentally ill, the physically disabled, and criminals.

Social Darwinism was at that time gaining credibility with scientists around the world and thus was introduced to Japan as well.

== Eugenic policies ==
Ikeda Shigenori (池田 林儀), a journalist who had been sent to Germany, started the magazine Eugenics movement (優生運動, Yūsei-undō) in 1926. In 1928, he promoted December 21 as "Blood-purity day" (junketsu de) and sponsored free blood tests at the Tokyo Hygiene Laboratory.

Nagai, the "Doctor of Eugenics", assumed the position of chief director of The Japanese Society of Health and Human Ecology (JSHHE), which was established in 1930.

By the early 1930s detailed "eugenic marriage" questionnaires were printed or inserted in popular magazines for public consumption. Promoters like Ikeda were convinced that these marriage surveys would not only insure the eugenic fitness of spouses but also help avoid class differences that could disrupt and even destroy marriage. The goal was to create a database of individuals and their entire households which would enable eugenicists to conduct in-depth surveys of any given family's genealogy.

An Investigation of Global Policy with the Yamato Race as Nucleus, a secret document for the use of policy-makers, cited eugenics approvingly, calling for the medical profession not to concentrate on the sick and weak, and for mental and physical training and selective marriages to improve the population.

=== National Eugenic Law ===
After rejection of the originally submitted Race Eugenic Protection Law in 1938, National Eugenic Law (ja:国民優生法, Kokumin Yūsei Hō) was promulgated in 1940 by the Konoe government.

This law limited compulsory sterilization to "inherited mental disease", promoted genetic screening and restricted birth control access. According to Matsubara Yoko, from 1940 to 1945, 454 people were sterilized in Japan under this law.

There were also campaigns to ensure reproduction amongst the "intelligent or superior elements" in the population.

Family center staff also attempted to discourage marriage between Japanese women and Korean men who had been recruited from the peninsula as laborers following its annexation by Japan in 1910. In 1942, a survey report argued that:

the Korean laborers brought to Japan, where they have established permanent residency, are of the lower classes and therefore of inferior constitution... By fathering children with Japanese women, these men could lower the caliber of the Yamato minzoku.

Eugenics was criticized by some Shinto ultranationalists as it seemed to treat Japanese people, considered of divine origin, as animals to be "bred". According to Nagai Hisomu, the Japanese Army's ignorance and dismissal of the science behind eugenics also stalled the spread of eugenic ideology.

Nakano Seigō, leader of the Tōhōkai, despite his political inspiration in Fascism and Nazism, harshly criticized eugenics, supremacism and racial theories and argued against the idea of the superiority of the "Yamato race" by claiming that the Japanese were part of the same Asian race as the Chinese or Koreans. According to Nakano, the divine mission of the Japanese Empire was not to oppress and subjugate other peoples but to liberate them from colonialism and unite them as part of a common Asian civilization.

== After 1945 ==
One of the last eugenic measures of the war regime was taken by the Higashikuni government. On 19 August 1945, the Home Ministry ordered local government offices to establish a prostitution service for Allied occupation soldiers to preserve the "purity" of the "Japanese race". The official declaration stated that:

Through the sacrifice of thousands of "Okichis" of the Shōwa era, we shall construct a dike to hold back the mad frenzy of the occupation troops and cultivate and preserve the purity of our race long into the future...

Such clubs were soon established by cabinet councillor Yoshio Kodama and Ryoichi Sasakawa.

In post-war Japan, the Eugenic Protection Law (ja:優生保護法, Yūsei Hogo Hō) was enacted in 1948 to replace the National Eugenic Law of 1940. The main provisions allowed for voluntary and involuntary eugenic operations (sterilizations) of people who had hereditary diseases (Article 4), non-hereditary mental illness and intellectual disability (Article 12), as well as where pregnancy would endanger the life of the woman. The operation did not require consent of the woman and her spouse, but the approval of the Prefectural Eugenic Protection Council. In addition to hereditary conditions, some doctors believed forced sterilization on normal mental patients was in the public interest. The operation was "enthusiastically recommended" for normal mental patients at some mental health institutions as recently as the 1970s.

The law also allowed for abortion for pregnancies in the cases of rape, leprosy, hereditarily-transmitted disease, or if the physician determined that the fetus would not be viable outside of the womb. Again, the consent of the woman and her spouse were not necessary. Birth control guidance and implementation was restricted to doctors, nurses and professional midwives accredited by the Prefectural government. The law was also amended in May 1949 to allow abortions for economic reasons at the sole discretion of the doctor, which in effect fully legalized abortion in Japan. After 1950, more than one million abortions each year were performed in Japan.

Forced sterilizations peaked at the end of the 1950s, reaching over 1,000 a year, and declined after that - by the 1980s they were only performed very rarely. In total, about 25,000 people, mostly women or girls as young as nine or ten years old, were forcibly sterilized between 1948 and 1996. Of those, about 16,500 did not consent to the procedure.

== Abolition of eugenics laws ==
Laws that decreed compulsory sterilization of the disabled were abolished with the approval of the Mother's Body Protection Law (母体保護法) on 18 June 1996. In 2019, the National Diet passed a law granting ¥3.2 million in compensation to each person who underwent forced sterilization under the old law. Around 16,500 people were operated on without consent and 8,000 more gave their consent, with at least some likely being under duress.

Some of those impacted by the old law sued the government for higher levels of compensation than offered by the 2019 law. In July 2024, the Supreme Court of Japan ruled that the Eugenic Protection Law passed in 1948 was unconstitutional, and eliminated the 20-year statute of limitations for those affected by the law. The court ordered that the government should pay damages and that included Yumi Suzuki for her forced sterilisation. Later that month, Japanese Prime Minister Fumio Kishida formally apologized to 130 victims of forced sterilization under the Eugenics Protection Law passed in 1948, and approved compensation measures for at least 25,000 affected victims or their relatives.

== Leprosy policies ==
The Leprosy Prevention laws of 1907, 1931 and 1953, the last one only repealed in 1996, permitted the segregation of patients in sanitaria where forced abortions and sterilization were common, even if the laws did not refer to it, and authorized punishment of patients "disturbing peace" as most Japanese leprologists believed that vulnerability to the disease was inheritable.

There were a few Japanese leprologists such as Noburo Ogasawara who argued against the "isolation-sterilization policy" but he was denounced as a traitor to the nation at the 15th Conference of the Japanese Association of Leprology in 1941. Under the colonial Korean Leprosy prevention ordinance, Korean patients were also subjected to hard labor.

In postwar Japan, the Eugenic Protection Law (優生保護法, Yūsei Hogo Hō) was enacted in 1948 to replace the National Eugenic Law of 1940. The indications of the Eugenic Protection Law included leprosy. This condition discontinued when the law changed into the Women's Body Protection Law.

== See also ==
- Racial issues in Japan
- Nazi eugenics
- Japanese nationalism
- Sagamihara stabbings
