= Abortion in Japan =

Abortion in Japan is legal under a term limit of 22 weeks for endangerment to the health of the pregnant woman, economic hardship, or rape. It was first legalized in 1948 under the Eugenic Protection Law initially for health and eugenic reasons, and later expanded to include economic hardship, which made it function quite broadly in practice.

Chapter XXIX of the Penal Code of Japan makes abortion de jure illegal in the country, but exceptions to the law are broad enough that it is widely accepted and practiced. Exceptions to the prohibition of abortion are regulated by the Maternal Health Protection Law that allows approved doctors to practice abortion on a woman if the pregnancy was the result of rape or if the continuation of the pregnancy endangers the maternal health because of physical or economic reasons. Anyone trying to practice abortion without the consent of the woman will be prosecuted, including the doctors. If a woman is married, consent from her spouse is also needed to approve abortions for socioeconomic reasons, although the rule doesn't apply if she is in a broken marriage, suffering abuse, or other domestic issues. Despite the partner's consent not being necessary for unmarried women and women who were impregnated by abusive partners or through rape, many doctors and medical institutions seek a signature from the man believed to have made the woman pregnant for fear of getting into legal trouble, rights advocates say.

In April 2023, medical abortion was approved in Japan for pregnancies up to 9 weeks of gestation. The Japanese health ministry approved an abortifacent from British pharmaceutical company Linepharma. Women who have a medical abortion are required to stay in the hospital for the abortion to be confirmed by the prescribing physician. Any other person who is not a certified gynecologist or obstetrician who aborts a fetus using abortifacients that is not approved by the Japanese Health Ministry will be penalized.

Abortions are not covered under Japanese insurance. Surgical abortions can cost between 100,000 yen and 200,000 yen; the total cost of the abortion pill and a medical consultation would be around 100,000 yen, according to the NHK.

Since the approval of the Mefeego pill pack in April 2023, the government conducted a survey that concluded there were no severe side effects and complications as a result of the newly approved medication. In August 2024, the Ministry of Health announced it is now considering the expansion of medical abortion to outpatient clinics that can coordinate inpatient facilities in the case of emergencies.

== History ==
In 1842, the Shogunate in Japan banned induced abortion in Edo, but the law did not affect the rest of the country until 1869, when abortion was banned nationwide. However, the crime was rarely punished unless the conception was a result of adultery or the woman died as a result of the abortion procedure.

According to the scholar Tiana Norgern, the abortion policy under the Meiji government was similar to that of the Edo period, and was fueled by the belief that a large population would yield more military and political influence on the international stage. In 1868, the emperor banned midwives from performing abortions, and in 1880, Japan's first penal code declared abortion a crime. The punishments for abortion grew more severe in 1907 when the penal code revised: women could be incarcerated for up to a year for having an abortion; practitioners could be jailed for up to seven. The Criminal Abortion Law of 1907 is still technically in effect today, but other legislation has overridden its effects.

In 1923, doctors were granted legal permission to perform emergency abortions to save the mother's life; abortions performed under different, less life-threatening circumstances were still prosecuted. In 1931, the Alliance for Reform of the Anti-Abortion Law (Datai Hō Kaisei Kiseikai) was formed by Abe Isoo and argued that "it is a woman's right not to bear a child she does not want, and abortion is an exercise of this right". This organization believed that abortion should be made legal in circumstances in which there was a high chance of genetic disorder; in which a woman was poor, on public assistance, or divorced; in which it endangered the woman's health; and in which the pregnancy was a result of rape. In 1934, the Fifth All-Japan Women's Suffrage Congress wrote up resolutions calling for the legalization of abortion as well as contraception. This did not result in any immediate reaction from the government at the time, but after the war, these resolutions were consulted when drafting legislation legalizing abortion.

Fearing a decline in birth rates in the following decades, the nationalist Konoe cabinet decided to implement a series of pro-natalist measures. On 22 January 1941, the Outline for the Establishment of Population Policy (人口政策確立要綱, Jinkō Seisaku Kakuritsu Yōkō) was approved, which included among its policies the prohibition of abortion.

In 1940, the National Eugenic Law stopped short of explicitly calling abortion legal by outlining a set of procedures a doctor had to follow in order to perform an abortion; these procedures included getting second opinions and submitting reports, though these could be ignored when it was an emergency. This was a daunting and complicated process that many physicians did not want to deal with, and some sources attribute the fall in abortion rate between 1941 and 1944 from 18,000 to 1,800 to this legislation.

After World War II, Japan found itself in a population crisis. In 1946, 10 million people were declared at risk of starvation, and between the years 1945 and 1950, the population increased by 11 million. In 1948, in the wake of the Miyuki Ishikawa case, Japan legalized abortion under special circumstances. The Eugenic Protection Law of 1948 made Japan one of the first countries in Asia to legalize induced abortion. In 1949, a revision passed which provided abortion in the case of extreme physical or economic distress to the mother. A further stipulation was added in 1952 requiring that the mother meet an economic threshold of poor living conditions to obtain an abortion. The whole law was revised as the Maternal Health Protection Law in 1996.

== Statistics ==
=== Abortion statistics ===
Statistics on abortion in Japan

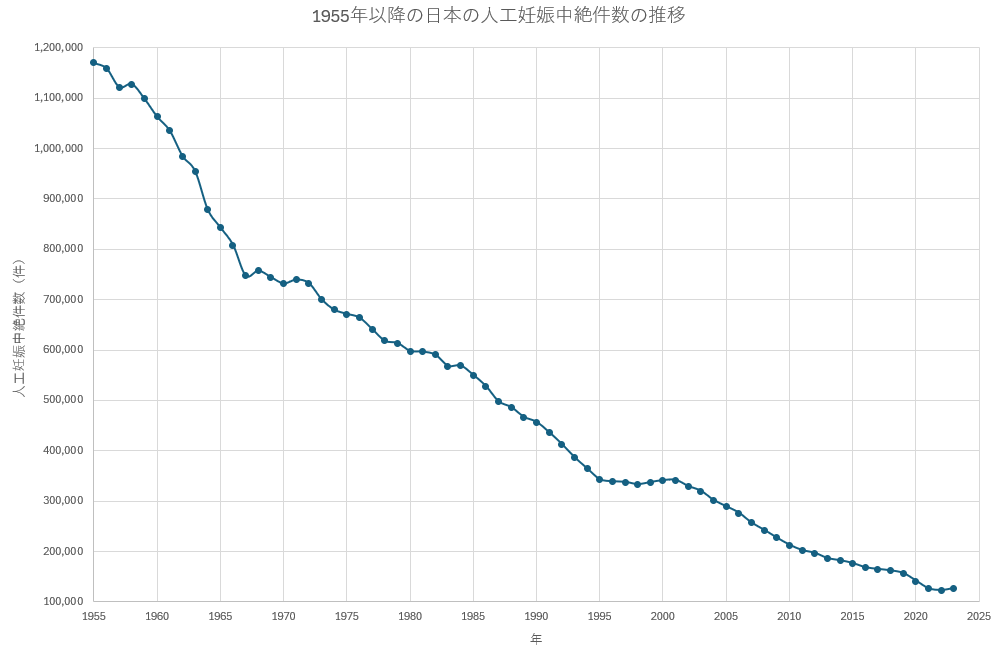
Number of abortions

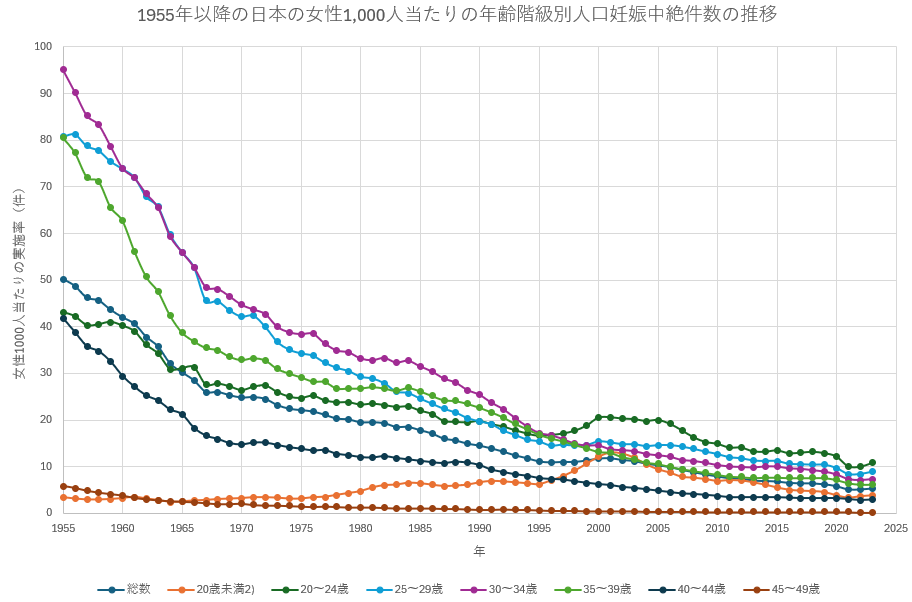
Abortions per 1,000 women

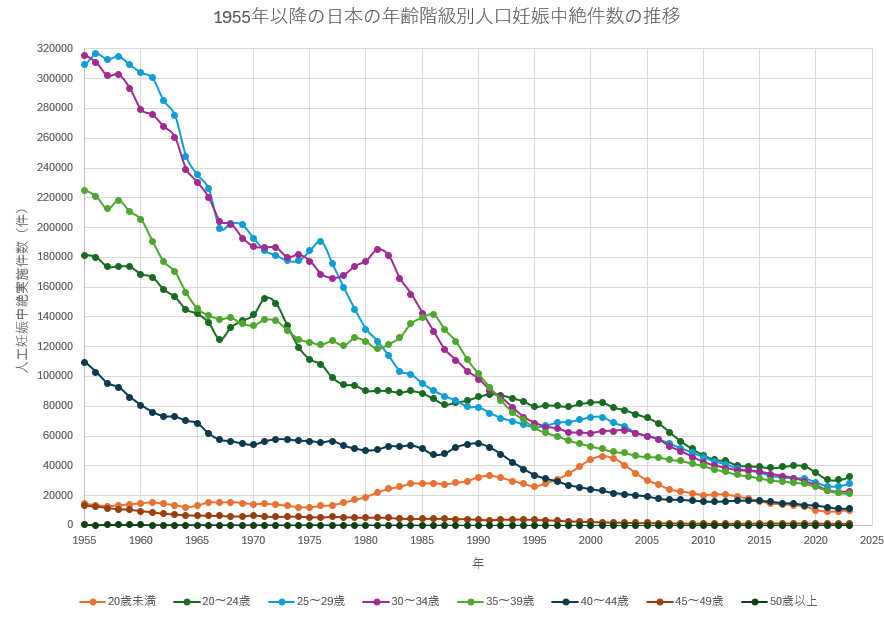
Number of abortions by age group

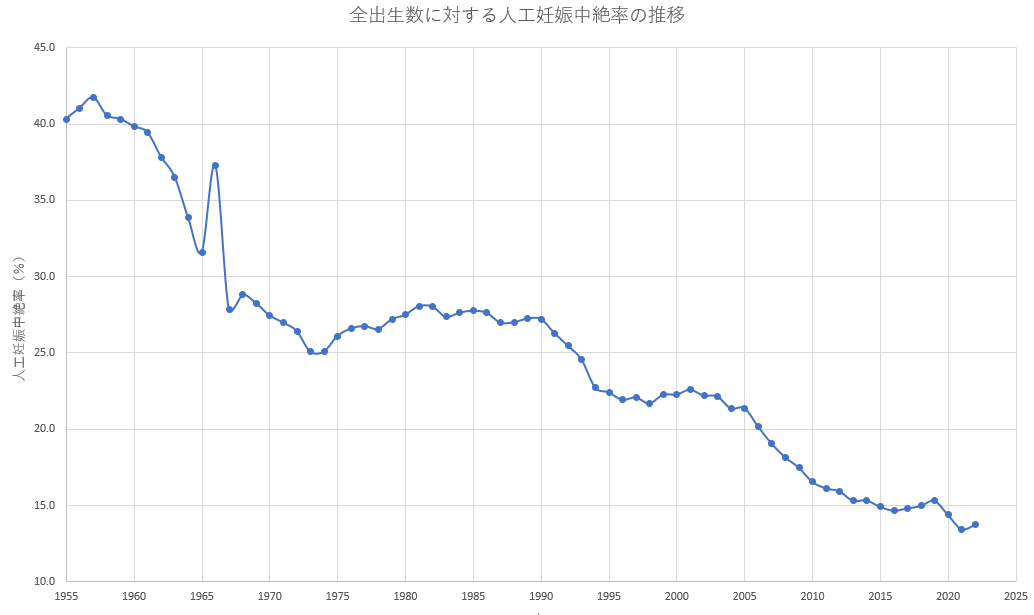
Abortions per live births

| | Number of abortions | Abortion rate （per live births） | Live births |
|---|---|---|---|
| 1949 | 101,601 | 3.8 | 2,696,638 |
| 1950 | 320,150 | 13.7 | 2,337,507 |
| 1951 | 458,757 | 21.5 | 2,137,689 |
| 1952 | 798,193 | 39.8 | 2,005,162 |
| 1953 | 1,068,066 | 57.2 | 1,868,040 |
| 1954 | 1,143,059 | 64.6 | 1,769,580 |
| 1955 | 1,170,143 | 67.6 | 1,730,692 |
| 1956 | 1,159,288 | 69.6 | 1,665,278 |
| 1957 | 1,122,316 | 71.6 | 1,566,713 |
| 1958 | 1,128,231 | 68.2 | 1,653,469 |
| 1959 | 1,098,853 | 67.6 | 1,626,088 |
| 1960 | 1,063,256 | 66.2 | 1,627,939 |
| 1961 | 1,035,329 | 65.1 | 1,611,772 |
| 1962 | 985,351 | 60.9 | 1,639,631 |
| 1963 | 955,092 | 57.6 | 1,681,242 |
| 1964 | 878,748 | 51.2 | 1,737,277 |
| 1965 | 843,248 | 46.2 | 1,844,452 |
| 1966 | 808,378 | 59.4 | 1,378,968 |
| 1967 | 747,490 | 38.6 | 1,956,725 |
| 1968 | 757,389 | 40.5 | 1,893,219 |
| 1969 | 744,451 | 39.4 | 1,910,927 |
| 1970 | 732,033 | 37.8 | 1,955,277 |
| 1971 | 739,674 | 37.0 | 2,022,204 |
| 1972 | 732,653 | 35.9 | 2,059,533 |
| 1973 | 700,532 | 33.5 | 2,091,983 |
| 1974 | 679,837 | 33.5 | 2,029,989 |
| 1975 | 671,597 | 35.3 | 1,901,440 |
| 1976 | 664,106 | 36.2 | 1,832,617 |
| 1977 | 641,242 | 36.5 | 1,755,100 |
| 1978 | 618,044 | 36.2 | 1,708,643 |
| 1979 | 613,676 | 37.4 | 1,642,580 |
| 1980 | 598,084 | 37.9 | 1,576,889 |
| 1981 | 596,569 | 39.0 | 1,529,455 |
| 1982 | 590,299 | 39.0 | 1,515,392 |
| 1983 | 568,363 | 37.7 | 1,508,687 |
| 1984 | 568,916 | 38.2 | 1,489,786 |
| 1985 | 550,127 | 38.4 | 1,431,577 |
| 1986 | 527,900 | 38.2 | 1,382,976 |
| 1987 | 497,756 | 37.0 | 1,346,658 |
| 1988 | 486,146 | 37.0 | 1,314,006 |
| 1989 | 466,876 | 37.4 | 1,246,802 |
| 1990 | 456,797 | 37.4 | 1,221,585 |
| 1991 | 436,299 | 35.7 | 1,223,245 |
| 1992 | 413,032 | 34.2 | 1,208,989 |
| 1993 | 386,807 | 32.6 | 1,188,282 |
| 1994 | 364,350 | 29.4 | 1,238,328 |
| 1995 | 343,024 | 28.9 | 1,187,064 |
| 1996 | 338,867 | 28.1 | 1,206,555 |
| 1997 | 337,799 | 28.3 | 1,191,665 |
| 1998 | 333,220 | 27.7 | 1,203,147 |
| 1999 | 337,288 | 28.6 | 1,177,669 |
| 2000 | 341,146 | 28.7 | 1,190,547 |
| 2001 | 341,588 | 29.2 | 1,170,662 |
| 2002 | 329,326 | 28.5 | 1,153,855 |
| 2003 | 319,831 | 28.5 | 1,123,610 |
| 2004 | 301,673 | 27.2 | 1,110,721 |
| 2005 | 289,127 | 27.2 | 1,062,530 |
| 2006 | 276,352 | 25.3 | 1,092,674 |
| 2007 | 256,672 | 23.6 | 1,089,818 |
| 2008 | 242,326 | 22.2 | 1,091,156 |
| 2009 | 226,878 | 21.2 | 1,070,036 |
| 2010 | 212,694 | 19.9 | 1,071,305 |
| 2011 | 202,106 | 19.2 | 1,050,807 |
| 2012 | 196,639 | 19.0 | 1,037,231 |
| 2013 | 186,253 | 18.1 | 1,029,817 |
| 2014 | 181,905 | 18.1 | 1,003,539 |
| 2015 | 176,388 | 17.5 | 1,005,721 |
| 2016 | 168,015 | 17.2 | 977,242 |
| 2017 | 164,621 | 17.4 | 946,146 |
| 2018 | 161,741 | 17.6 | 918,400 |
| 2019 | 156,430 | 18.0 | 865,239 |
| 2020 | 141,433 | 16.8 | 840,832 |
| 2021 | 126,174 | 15.5 | 811,604 |
| 2022 | 122,725 | 15.9 | 770,747 |
| 2023 | 126,734 | 17.4 | 727,288 |
| 2024 | 127,992 | 18.7 | 686,061 |

Overall, in 2019, the total number of abortions officially reported was 156,430, representing a 56% decrease from the number reported for 2000. The overall abortion rate changed from 22.3 to 15.3 abortions per 1,000 women aged 15–39 years. Going further back, there were 598,084 abortions in 1980 and 1,063,256 in 1960. In 2019, 49 abortions were reported for girls aged 13 and under, and a further 3,904 for girls aged 14–17. Some 39,805 abortions were performed on women aged 20–24.

In 2020, according to the health ministry, there were 145,340 abortions, down 7.3% from the previous year.

According to researchers, in more than 99 percent of cases, the reason reported for performing an abortion was to protect the woman's health; this percentage remained constant during 1975–1995. The same researchers also suggest that while official figures may be lower than the true rate of abortion due to under-reporting by doctors in order to lower tax bills and protect patient identities, trends may be "reasonably accurate".

== Legislation ==
Maternal Health Protection Law

Japanese Parliament
- Citation: Law No.156 of 1948
- Enacted by: Ashida Cabinet
- Royal assent: Emperor Hirohito
- Signed: June 28, 1948
- Commenced: July 13, 1948

Legislative history
- Introduced by: Shidzue Kato
- Passed: September 4, 1948

Amends
- In 1996 the Eugenic Protection Law was revised as the Maternal Health Protection.

Repeals
- Chapter 4 and 5
- Status: Current legislation

=== Background ===
The whole law was enacted as the Eugenic Protection Law in 1948 and revised as the Maternal Health Protection Law in 1996.

=== The content of Maternal Health Protection Law ===
- Chapter 1 – General Provisions (Articles 1–2)

Chapter 1 sets forth the purpose of the Act, which is to safeguard the life and health of mothers by establishing regulations concerning sterilization and induced abortion. Under the former Eugenic Protection Law, the stated objectives included the prevention of the birth of offspring deemed genetically inferior from a eugenic perspective, in addition to the protection of maternal life and health.

- Chapter 2 – Sterilization (formerly referred to as Eugenic Surgery; Articles 3–13)

Under the previous legislation, eugenic surgery (i.e., sterilization) could be carried out on individuals or their spouses in cases involving hereditary psychiatric disorders, hereditary physical conditions, or leprosy. It was also applicable to genetic relatives in cases of hereditary mental illness. Moreover, in instances involving specific hereditary mental or physical conditions, if a medical practitioner deemed it necessary for the public good to prevent transmission of such disorders, sterilization could be performed—irrespective of the individual’s or their spouse’s consent—following deliberation by the Prefectural Eugenic Protection Review Board.

In contrast, the current Act permits sterilization to be conducted without formal examination, provided there is consent from both the individual and their spouse. Additionally, Articles 4 through 13 of the previous legislation have been repealed.

- Chapter 3 – Maternity Protection (Articles 14–15)

Article 14 provides that designated physicians may perform induced abortions with the consent of the individual and their spouse if any of the following conditions are met:

1. Continuation of the pregnancy or childbirth is likely to pose a serious threat to the mother’s health, whether for physical or economic reasons.
2. The pregnancy occurred as a result of sexual assault involving violence or intimidation, or during circumstances in which the individual was unable to resist or decline.
- Chapter 4 – Repealed (Formerly established the Prefectural Eugenic Protection Review Board)
- Chapter 5 – Repealed (Formerly established Eugenic Protection Counseling Centers)
- Chapter 6 – Notification, Prohibitions, and Other Provisions (Articles 25–28)
- Chapter 7 – Penalties (Articles 29 to 34)

== Contraceptive use ==
A scenario study was conducted to assess the extent to which the unintended pregnancy rate in Japan, for the period when oral contraceptives (OC) had not yet been legalized for family planning purposes and couples relied mainly on condoms, might change if more women were to use OC. Data provided by the 1994 Japanese National Survey on Family Planning were used to construct scenarios for national contraceptive use. Annual failure rates of contraceptive methods and nonuse were applied to the contraceptive use scenarios, to obtain estimates of the annual number of contraceptive failure-related pregnancies. Subsequently, contraceptive practice situations assuming higher OC use rates were defined, and the associated change in the number of contraceptive failure-related pregnancies was estimated for each situation. It emerged that OC use rates of 15% decreased the expected number of unintended pregnancies by 13–17%, whereas use rates of 25% resulted in decreases of 22–29% and use rates of 50% in decreases of 45–58%. The findings were reasonably robust to variation in the assumptions that were made. In conclusion, each theoretical percentage increase in the OC use rate in Japan was found to lead to a roughly equivalent percentage decrease in the number of unintended pregnancies.

Oral contraceptives were legalized in 1999. Emergency contraceptive pills were approved by the Ministry of Health, Labour and Welfare of Japan in 2011.

== See also ==
- Abortion law
- Birth control in Japan
- Eugenics in Japan
