= Japan Family Planning Association =

Japanese affiliate of the International Planned Parenthood Federation

The Japan Family Planning Association (日本家族計画連盟), also known as the Family Planning Federation of Japan, is the Japanese affiliate of the International Planned Parenthood Federation and is the premier family planning organization in the country. It was founded in 1954, following the first annual World Population Conference held in Bombay, India, in 1952. The FPFJ advocates for the concept of sexual and reproductive rights being a basic human right; it also encourages the training of family planning workers and assists in the development and dissemination of information, education, and communication materials regarding family planning. The association also encourages the use of contraceptives and facilitates their community-based distribution. The FPFJ was one of the most active lobbying organizations for the legalization of oral contraceptives in Japan, and has shown political tact in advocating for the maintenance of the legal status of abortion in Japan.

== Notable figures ==
- Shizue Kato
