= Shidzue Katō =

Japanese politician (1897–2001)

- 加藤 シヅエ
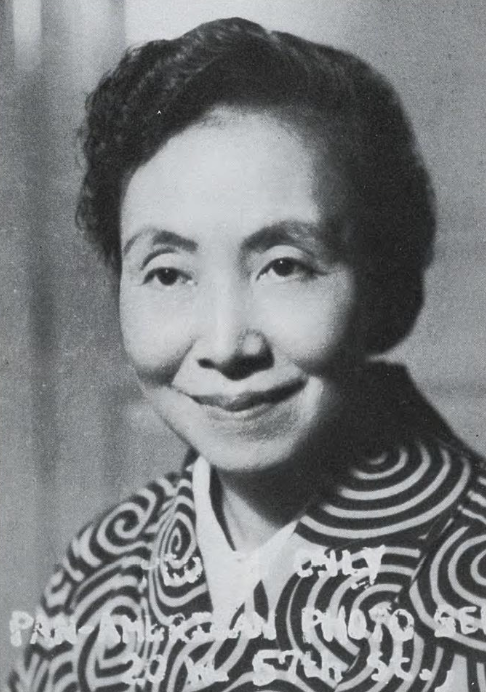
- Katō in 1932

Member of the House of Councillors
- In office 4 June 1950 – 7 July 1974
- Preceded by: Constituency established
- Succeeded by: Multi-member district
- Constituency: National district

Member of the House of Representatives
- In office 10 April 1946 – 23 December 1948
- Preceded by: Constituency established
- Succeeded by: Ken'ichi Itō
- Constituency: Tokyo 2nd (1946–1947); Tokyo 2nd (1947–1948)

Personal details
- Born: Shidzue Hirota; 2 March 1897 Bunkyō, Tokyo, Japan
- Died: 22 December 2001 (aged 104) Bunkyō, Tokyo, Japan
- Party: Socialist (1946–1951; 1955–1979)
- Other political affiliations: RSP (1951–1955)
- Spouse(s): Keikichi Ishimoto (m. 1914; div. 1944) Kanjū Katō (m. 1944; died 1978)

Shidzue Katō (加藤 シヅエ, Katō Shizue; March 2, 1897 – December 22, 2001), also published as Shidzue Ishimoto, was a 20th-century Japanese feminist and one of the first women elected to the Diet of Japan, best known as a pioneer in the birth control movement. She is known in the U.S. as the "Margaret Sanger of Japan".

== Early life ==
Shidzue Katō was born on March 2, 1897, in Japan to a wealthy ex-samurai family. Her father, Hirota Ritarô was a successful engineer who received his education and training at the Tokyo Imperial University. Her mother, Tsurumi Toshiko, came from a notable and highly educated family. Hirota travelled frequently to the West for work, and because of this Katō and her family grew up familiar with Western things At age 17, Katō was married to Baron Keikichi Ishimoto (石本恵吉), a Christian humanist interested in social reforms. He was the son of Ishimoto Shinroku.

== Move to United States ==
Shortly after their marriage, Katō (then Ishimoto) and her husband moved to the Miike coalfield in Kyūshū. For three years, they witnessed the horrendous conditions under which the men and women there worked. This experience resulted in Katō and her husband suffering from a breakdown of health, which prompted the couple to move to the United States in 1919. In the United States, Baron Ishimoto began to veer from Christian humanism toward a more radical Communist position. Katō began to live a more independent life as her husband went off to Washington, D.C., to act as a consultant and interpreter for the Japanese delegation to a conference of the International Labor Organization. During this time, Katō lived in a tenement apartment and enrolled in secretarial and English courses. It was during this time that Katō began to socialize with the socialist acquaintances of her husband, which eventually led her to meet Margaret Sanger. It was this meeting with Sanger that inspired Katō's decision to form a birth control movement on her return to Japan.

== Return to Japan and activism ==
On her return to Japan in 1921, Katō continued to strive for economic independence, and began her mission to propagate birth control education. She got a job as a private secretary for the Y.W.C.A, which primarily consisted of introducing Western visitors of Japanese culture and people. She also opened a yarn shop called the Minerva Yarn Store, where she sold imported wool products.

During this time Katō published many writings in support of easier access to birth control for women. She argued that Japan's growing population problem could be solved by women. She believed that giving women control of their own reproduction would allow women to achieve greater independence, as well as allow there to be a public issue in which women took a leadership role. Another part of her argument was that birth control would help the people of Japan to raise better children. She thought that by having fewer children, women could create better educational and economic opportunities for the children that they did have.

It is around this time that Katō met Kanjū Katō, who would later become her second husband. They met in 1923, when Kanjū Katō, a labor organizer, arranged for her to speak to miners at Ashio copper mine. She was later granted a divorce from her first husband, Baron Ishimoto, and married Katō in 1944.

In keeping with the "influence and respectability of eugenics" in the first part of the twentieth century, Katō Shidzue too supported eugenics, believing that children born to two healthy parents would be better off than children born to sick or weak parents.

The right-wing pro-natalist Japanese government arrested Katō in 1937 for her promotion of "dangerous thoughts," specifically her advocacy of birth control and abortion rights, and she spent two weeks in prison. This temporarily ended the birth control movement in Japan until after World War II.

== Diet of Japan (1946–1974) ==
Katō was the first woman to campaign for office in Japan, campaigning under a Socialist platform with and emphasis on American-style democracy. In 1946, Shidzue Katō was elected to the Diet of Japan, the national legislature of Japan. Her campaign platform was based on family planning and improving the economic prospects of women. In 1946 she wrote concerning the link between the birth control movement and Japanese democracy:

Giving birth to many, and letting many die—repeating such an unwise way of life for Japanese women will result in exhaustion of the maternal body, as well as mental damage and material loss for the family.… Without the liberation and improvement of women, it is impossible to build democracy in Japan.

Although Katō was initially hopeful of women's growing political role, she was soon marginalized in the mostly male Diet. Despite this, she looked for other ways to achieve her political reforms. In 1946 she was instrumental in organizing the first "women only" rally in Tokyo. This rally protested for greater economic resources for women.

Katō was later elected to four six-year terms in the Upper House. She continued to advocate for reforms affecting women's rights and family planning. Katō championed many causes during this time, including birth control legislation, the abolition of the feudal family code, the establishment of the Women's and Minors Bureau of the Department of Labor, and environmental issues. She was also helped to establish the Family Planning Federation of Japan, which works to achieve "a society where everyone in the country can have access to voluntary reproductive health services".

== Honors ==
Even after Katō retired from politics, she continued her political activism. She continued to lecture on feminist issues, as well as continued to chair the Family Planning Federation of Japan.

In 1988, Katō received the United Nations Population Award.

In 1996, The Katō Shidzue Award was established by Dr. Attiya Inayatullah to commemorate her work. The Katō Shizue Award "targets women's groups, women's organizations and/or individual women who are active in the movement toward improvement of sexual and reproductive health/rights of women as well as empowerment of women (i.e., social, economic, political and legal empowerment) in developing countries and/or in Japan."

== Death and legacy ==
Katō died on December 22, 2001, at the age of 104. In an obituary at the Web site of the International Planned Parenthood Federation, the writer noted that her efforts "have continued to bear fruits for Japanese society, bringing down the number of abortions, infant mortality, and maternal death rates, while increasing contraceptive usage to 80 percent. Japan's family planning model has been so successful that it attracts attention from other countries as a working model."

== Works ==
- Facing Two Ways: The Story of My Life, published by Farrar and Rinehard (New York, NY), 1935. An edited version for children called East Way, West Way: A Modern Japanese Girlhood, illustrated by Fuji Nakamizo, was published by Farrar and Rinehard (New York, NY), in 1936.
- Straight Road, 1956.
- Katō Shizue Hyakusai, c. 1997.
