= Ryokufūkai (1964–65) =

Political party in Japan

The Ryokufūkai (Japanese: 緑風会, lit. Green Breeze Society) was a political party in Japan.

== History ==
The party was established in the House of Councillors in March 1964 following a split in the Dai-Niin Club. Its name was taken from the original Ryokufūkai which had merged into the Dōshikai in 1960, with the Dōshikai merging into Dai-Niin Club in 1962.

The party was disbanded in June 1965.
