= Oku Mumeo =

Japanese feminist and politician (1895–1997)

Mumeo Oku
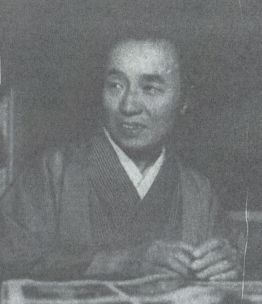
- Mumeo Oku in 1953
- Born: October 24, 1895; Fukui, Japan
- Died: July 7, 1997 (aged 101); Tokyo, Japan
- Citizenship: Japanese
- Occupation: Politician
- Spouse: Eiichi Oku
- Children: Kyoichi Oku; Kii Nakamura

Mumeo Oku (奥 むめお, Oku Mumeo; October 24, 1895 – July 7, 1997) was an important Japanese feminist and politician who served three terms in Japan's Imperial Diet after having been a leader in the early modern women's suffrage movement in Japan. She played an important role in various early Japanese women's rights movements, and she was a crucial part of Japan's consumer movement. She was a renowned activist in the 1920s, co-founding the New Women's Association with Hiratsuka Raichō and Ichikawa Fusae, and eventually held a seat in the House of Councilors from 1947 to 1965 when she retired.

== Biography ==
=== Life and activism ===
Oku Mumeo was born the eldest daughter of a third-generation blacksmith on October 24, 1895, outside of Fukui. Her father disliked being a blacksmith and urged her to continually further her education. Her mother died of tuberculosis on November 3, 1910, when she was still too young to remember much of her mother. She decided to further her education at the Japan Women's University in 1912. Her father died in the middle of February in 1918 at the age of forty-two.

In late 1919, Oku received a visit from Hiratsuka Raichō, who asked if she would be interested in co-founding a new organization, the New Women's Association, with the intention of petitioning the 42nd Diet on reforms to Article 5 of the Police Safety Regulations and also petitioning to prevent men infected with a venereal disease from marrying. Following the failure to revise Article 5, Ichikawa left for America, resigning her position as the head of the organization, and Raichō suddenly moved to the foot of Mt. Akagi in the Gumma Prefecture, leaving Oku as the head of the New Women's Association. Finally, on March 25, 1922, Oku Mumeo and the New Women's Association succeeded in revising Article 5 on the last day of the 45th Diet.

Oku Mumeo went on to dissolve the New Women's Association on December 8, 1922, and form the Women's League on the seventeenth of that same month. With her growing fame in women's activist circles, she was asked to move to Nakano in order to assist with the Nakano Consumer Union Movement in 1926. Working in the consumer movement she found the area of activist work that would drive her, but she went on to lead, or at the very least be associated with, various women's activist movements and organizations, such as the Association of Households, forming the Cooperative Women's Consumer Union, opposing the dissolution of the proletarian parties, and starting women's settlements with the Women's Settlement Movement.

=== Marriage and children ===
Oku Mumeo married a man named Oku Eiichi, a poet who never really had much success and was employed in the translation department of Sakai Toshihiko's Baifunsha. She was survived by her son, Kyoichi Oku, and her daughter, Kii Nakamura, who, like her mother before her, served as chair of the Housewives' Association.

=== Death and afterward ===
Oku Mumeo died on July 7, 1997, living to be a hundred and one years old. Her numerous contributions to activism in modern Japan helped Japanese women become able to run for and hold public office, and her Housewives' Association helped improve the overall quality of life in Japan.

== Bibliography ==
Loftus, Ronald (2004). Telling Lives: Women's Self-Writing in Modern Japan. Honolulu, Hawaii: University of Hawaii Press. ISBN 978-0824828349.
