= League of Women Voters of Japan =

Japanese feminist NGO

The League of Women Voters of Japan (Nihon Fujin Yūkensha Dōmei) was a Japanese NGO advocating equal rights for women. It was established by Senator Fusae Ichikawa and other feminists in 1945, when Japanese women obtained the right to vote, inspired by the American League of Women Voters. It has 51 branches throughout Japan, and is affiliated with the International Alliance of Women. The headquarters of the league are in Tokyo.

== History ==
The New Japan Women's League (NJWL) was established on November 3, 1946 in order to improve women's legal status in Japan, and inform Japanese women about democracy and citizenship. Fusae Ichikawa served as the first president. In May 1948, the League of Women Voters sponsored a joint gathering of women's groups "in the cause of preserving peace."

Eventually the NJWL merged with the Japanese League of Women Voters in 1950.

After WWII, the League had trouble recruiting new members, and most members were housewives. The league has remained relatively conservative over time and has continued to have difficulty attracting new and young members. By 1983, there were about 5,000 active members.

By 2014, there were only about 2,000 active members. In April 2016, the League of Women Voters of Japan has been dissolved due to continuing decrease and aging of members.

== Notable members ==
- Fusae Ichikawa
- Teiko Kihira
