= Shigeri =

- Gender: Both

Origin
- Origin: Japanese
- Meaning: Different meanings depending on the kanji used

Shigeri (written: 繁理 or しげり in hiragana) is a unisex Japanese given name. Notable people with the name include:

- Shigeri Akabane (1941–2001), Japanese professional midget wrestler
- Shigeri Yamataka (山高 しげり; 1899–1977), Japanese journalist and feminist
