= Shigeyo Takeuchi =

Japanese physician (1881–1975)

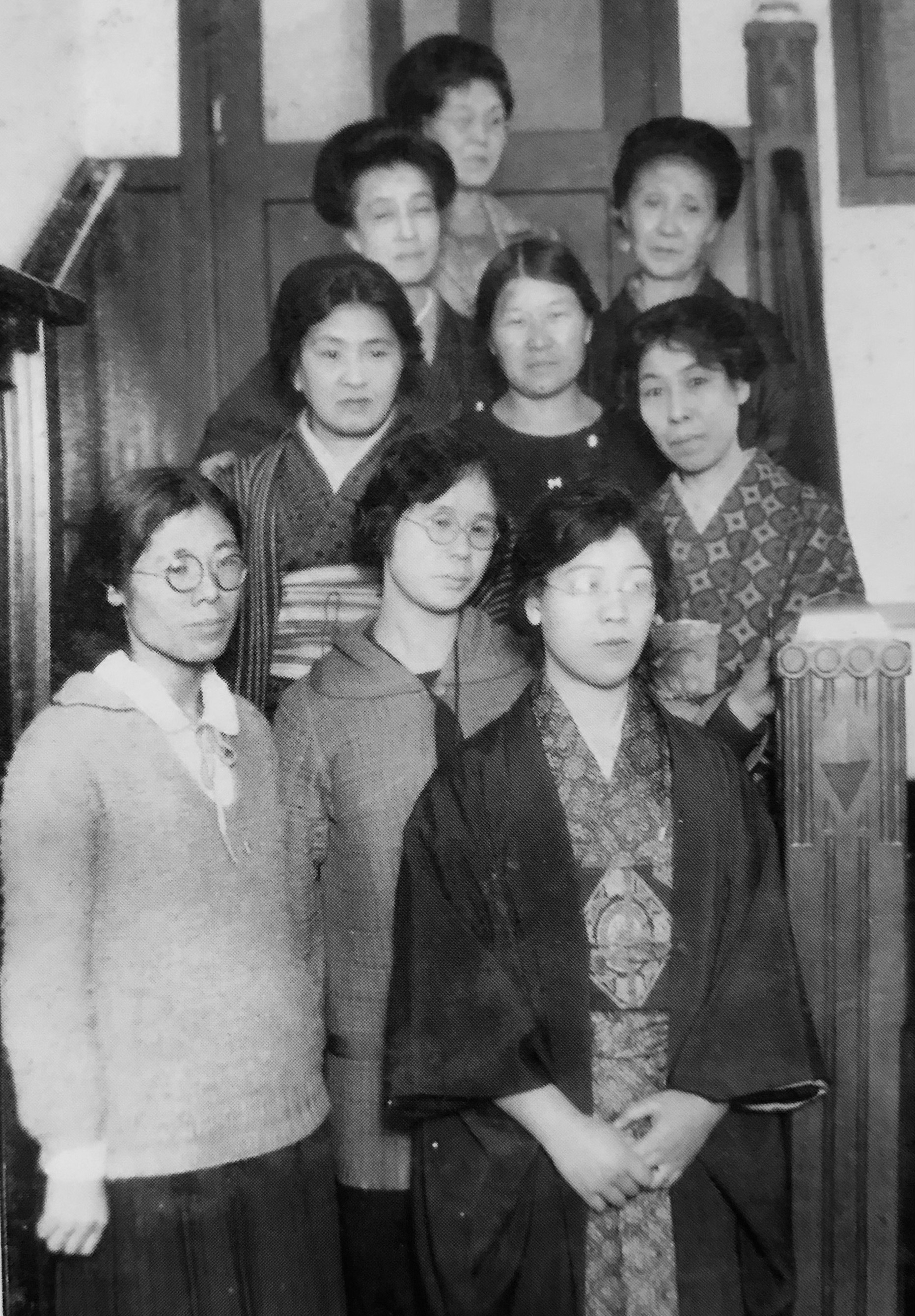
On December 13, 1926, the 2nd anniversary of the Women's Suffrage League was held. Front row, from left: Fusae Ichikawa, Shigeri Kaneko, Etsuko Ohira. Middle row, from left: Kiiko Yagihashi, Ochimi Kubushiro, Mako Ogihara. Back row, from left: Yoshiko Tanaka, Shigeyo Takeuchi, Kyoko Okada.

Shigeyo Takeuchi (竹内茂代) (August 31, 1881 – December 15, 1975) was a Japanese physician. She was one of the first women elected to the Japanese Diet, though she only served one term.

== Early life and education ==
Takeuchi was born Shigeyo Ide on August 31, 1881 in what is now Kawakami, Nagano. She was the oldest daughter of a local politician. As a child, she briefly attended elementary school, but stopped to take care of her siblings. After contracting alopecia, she went to a hospital in Tokyo, where she was inspired to become a physician by two female physicians who worked there. She studied under Yoshioka Yayoi, and graduated from the Tokyo Women's Medical University in 1908. She was a member of the university's first graduating class. She married Kohei Takeuchi in 1916.

== Career ==
Takeuchi opened a private practice in Shinjuku in 1919. She also became active in the Japanese women's suffrage movement, and was a member of the Japanese Women's Suffrage League with Ichikawa Fusae. In 1933 she earned a doctorate from Tokyo Imperial University.

In 1946 she was elected to the House of Representatives as a member of the Liberal Party. She was one of the first women to be elected to the Diet, and led the Female Diet Members' club. She focused on issues related to health care, but also advocated for eugenics. Takeuchi was purged from office later that year and did not reenter politics.

Takeuchi died on December 15, 1975.
