= Kusunose Kita =

Kusunose Kita (楠瀬喜多 1836–1920) was one of the first Japanese advocates for women's political rights. Her actions helped realize women's suffrage (briefly) in parts of her home town of Kochi city, where she is still known as "minken baasan" ("people's rights granny").

== Biography ==
Kusunose Kita (楠瀬喜多) was born in Hirooka (part of present-day Kōchi city) as the daughter of Kesamaru Gihei, a rice merchant, in 1836. At the age of 21, she married Kusunose Minoru (楠瀬実), a samurai living in the castle town of Kōchi (the present Tōjin-chō area) and a kendō instructor, but was widowed in 1874. Not having any children, she was the sole heir to her husband's property and became the head of the family (戸主 koshu). In spite of her status, and even though she was paying enough taxes, she could not vote in the 1878 elections, to be held for the recently established local assembly in Kōchi, as only males were allowed to do so. In the same year, therefore, she submitted a petition to the prefectural authorities, stating that she would refuse to pay taxes as long as her right to vote continued to be denied.

Regulations for prefectural assemblies (府県会 fukenkai) at that time provided that suffrage be given to all men over 20 who had permanent residence in that district and were paying more than five yen land tax per year. Still, the Municipality Formation Law of July 1878 did not provide any national criteria for women's suffrage (or their exclusion thereof) as far as town and village assemblies were concerned.

Protesting the fact that she was not allowed to vote because she was a woman, Kusunose refused to pay taxes, but her plea with the authorities was rejected. She then decided to take her petition national, addressing it to the Ministry of Internal Affairs. When the Osaka Daily reported on the matter on January 26, 1879, her case was brought to national attention. Although, eventually, she was excluded from participating in these elections, the Town and Village Assembly Law that was put into effect in September 1880 allowed local assemblies to establish their own regulations concerning elections. Without hesitation, the local authorities of the Kami-machi district (in present-day Kochi-city) adopted regulations that allowed women to participate, and shortly after, the neighboring village of Kodakasa (also in present-day Kochi city) followed suit. This is how, for the first time in modern Japan, active participation in elections for women was realized.

Because the national government revised the above-mentioned law in 1884, however, the towns and villages were deprived of their right to enact their own election rulebook, and the right to vote was again restricted to men only. Even if short-lived, Kusunose's petitions and their outcome are considered a remarkable contribution to the Freedom and People's Rights Movement. Kusunose continued to fight for women's rights, earning herself the endearing title of "minken baasan" (民権ばあさん "people's rights granny") which lives on in Kōchi up to this day. She died in 1920, at the age of 84, during the heyday of Taishō democracy. Her grave can be found in a graveyard on Mount Hitsuzan in Kochi city.

== Sources ==
Text of Petition

Osaka Daily (大坂日報, Ōsaka Nippō)

The newspaper article published in the Osaka Nippō on January 26, 1879, that turned her into a national celebrity ran the whole text of Kusunose's petition, followed by the prefectural authorities' rebuttal. This is the introductory part of the article:

People's worth lies in their intelligence, not their beards. The Risshisha (Self-help Society), a political society founded in Tosa in 1874, was holding speech meetings every Saturday. Speakers spoke mainly about the popular rights and freedom. Most of the audience were men, but among them there was an intelligent, energetic woman called Kusunose Kita.

No matter how cold or hot it was, she never failed to attend the gatherings and took the lead, encouraging participants, as if she were a goddess amidst gods. Kusunose happens to be the head of a family in Tōjin-chō, having advocated equal rights regardless of sex for a long time. However, when she was about to vote at a ward assembly election last year, the head of the ward told her that women have no right to vote and cannot stand in as a guarantor for legal documents, even if they are the head of family.

Kusunose protested against the instructions, saying that "without equal rights, there should be no obligation to pay taxes for women".

She finally filed a petition to the Prefecture, calling on new instructions to make equal rights clear.

== Tribute ==
On October 18, 2019, Google celebrated her 183rd birthday with a Google Doodle.

== See also ==
- Women's suffrage in Japan
