= Teiko =

Teiko is the common Roman alphabet spelling of two different Japanese given names, one feminine and one masculine; they are spelled differently in Japanese.

The feminine name (ていこ) is spelled Teiko in systemic romanisation. It may be written with a variety of kanji including 貞子; these same characters may also be read as a Korean feminine name, Jeong-ja. People with this name include:

- Teiko Nishi (born c. 1967), an American former women's basketball player
- Teiko Kihira (1928–2015), was a Japanese politician and activist
- Teiko Inahata (1931–2022), was a Japanese haiku poet, essayist and literary critic
- Teiko Tomita (1896–1990), was a Japanese tanka poet

The masculine name (ていこう, spelled Teikō in systemic romanisation, ending in a long vowel) may refer to:

- Teikō Shiotani (1899–1988), a photographer from Tottori, Japan
