= Shigeri Yamataka =

Japanese politician

- 山高 しげり
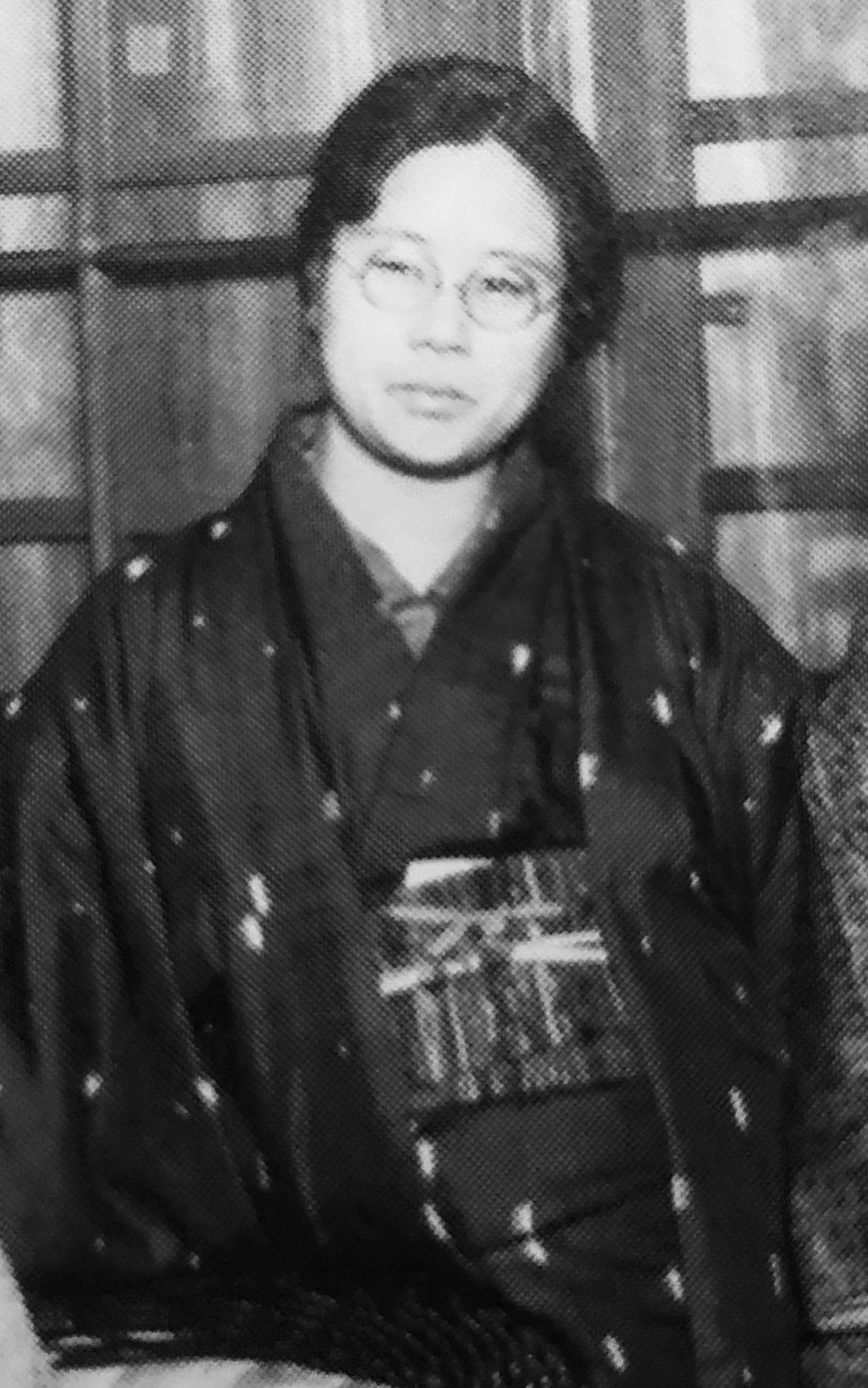
- Yamataka in 1931

Member of the House of Councillors
- In office 7 September 1962 – 3 July 1971
- Constituency: National district

Personal details
- Born: 5 January 1899 Tsu, Mie, Japan
- Died: 13 November 1977 (aged 78)
- Party: Dai-Niin Club

Shigeri Yamataka (山高しげり, Yamataka Shigeri; 1899 – 1977) (also Kaneko Shigeri and later Yamataka Shigeri, sometimes incorrectly referred to as Shigeri Takayama) was a Japanese feminist and founder of the League for the Defense of Women's Rights. In 1952 she also took part in Chifuren, when it was formed, one of the largest women's organizations in Japan with more than 6 million members. She was also Chifuren's President.

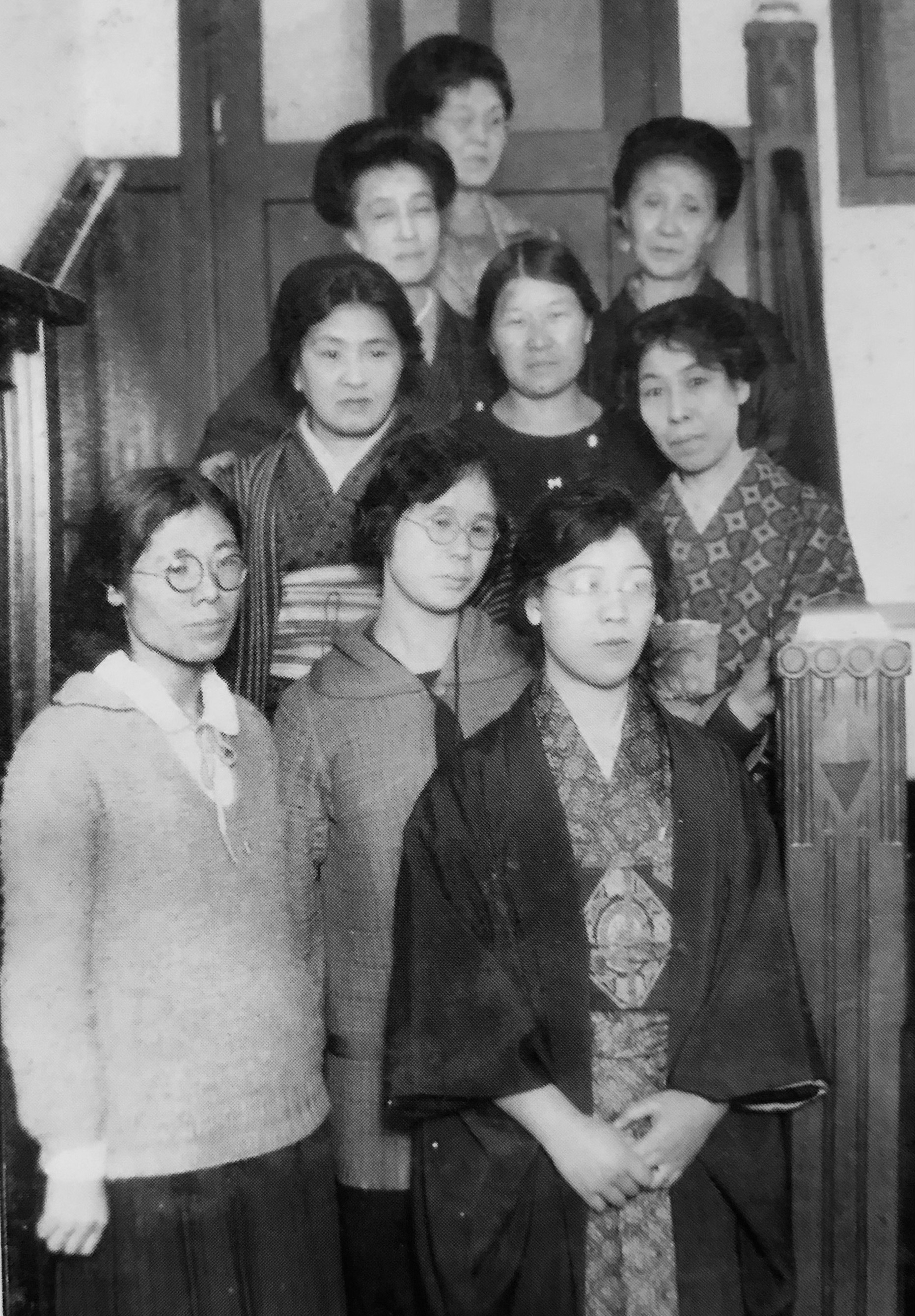
On December 13, 1926, the 2nd anniversary of the Women's Suffrage League was held. Front row, from left: Fusae Ichikawa, Shigeri Kaneko, Etsuko Ohira. Middle row, from left: Kiiko Yagihashi, Ochimi Kubushiro, Mako Ogihara. Back row, from left: Yoshiko Tanaka, Shigeyo Takeuchi, Kyoko Okada.

== Biography ==
Yamataka was born in Mie Prefecture. She began her career in Japan as a journalist. She worked at Kokumin Shinbun and Shufu no Tomo. With Fusae Ichikawa, she co-founded the Women's Suffrage Union (Women's Suffrage League) in Japan in 1924. They hoped to extend suffrage to women, but when the government passed the Men's Suffrage Law in 1924, women were excluded. Despite this, the Women's Suffrage Union continued its work for many years.

After the end of World War II, Yamataka continued her political activism. She worked for war pensions to be granted to widows of war veterans, and for children's rights. On August 25, 1945, Yamataka co-founded the Women's Committee on Postwar Policy (Sengo Taisaku Fujin Iinkai). The co-founders were Fusae Ichikawa, Tsuneko Akamatsu, and Natsu Kawasaki. The first meeting was on September 11, 1945, with over 70 women in attendance. Among the priorities of the organization were: welcoming returning soldiers, improving food production, increasing household savings, gaining suffrage for women over 20, establishing the right for women over 25 to run for office, reforming the local and central governments, and allowing women to hold jobs in the civil service.

When women gained suffrage in Japan in 1945, Yamataka ran for public office and was elected twice (1962-1971) to the House of Councillors, the upper house in the Diet of Japan, the country's federal government.

In 1952, Yamataka co-founded the National Federation of Regional Women's Organizations, known as Chifuren, in Japan. She eventually became President and remained in this role until her death in 1977. Chifuren was also active in promoting consumer protection and household economy.

She was one of the signatories of the agreement to convene a convention for drafting a world constitution. As a result, for the first time in human history, a World Constituent Assembly convened to draft and adopt the Constitution for the Federation of Earth.

== See also ==
- Feminism in Japan
- Women's suffrage in Japan
