= Teiko Kihira =

Japanese politician and activist (1928–2015)

- 紀平 悌子
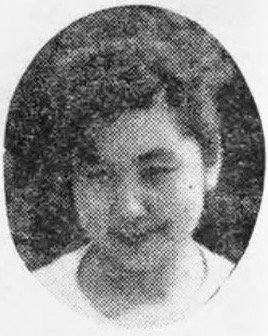
- Kihira in 1963

Member of the House of Councillors
- In office 24 July 1989 – 23 July 1995
- Preceded by: Masaru Urata
- Succeeded by: Kiyoshi Asoda
- Constituency: Kumamoto at-large

Personal details
- Born: 2 February 1928 Fukuoka, Japan
- Died: 19 July 2015 (aged 87)
- Party: Independent
- Education: University of the Sacred Heart

Teiko Kihira (Japanese: 紀平 悌子, Hepburn: Kihira Teiko; February 2, 1928 – July 19, 2015) was a Japanese politician and activist. Kihira was a member of the House of Councilors in Japan. She was involved in the League of Women Voters of Japan where she served in different capacities including vice chair and president of the group.

== Career ==
Kihira grew up on Kyushu. When she was a student, she became a secretary to Fusae Ichikawa. In 1951, she was involved in an anti-corruption campaign. Kihira took over as the chair of the League of Women Voters of Japan in 1971. In 1989, she became a member of the House of Councilors. She served on the Parliament until 1995, where she again returned to working with the League of Women Voters of Japan.

Kihira died in 2015 of heart failure.
