= Chifuren =

Japanese women's organization

Chifuren (also National League of Regional Women's Organizations or National Federation of Regional Women's Organizations (全国地域婦人団体連絡協議会, Zen Nihon chiiki fujin dantai renraku kyōgikai)) is one of the largest women's organizations operating in Japan. Chifuren is an umbrella organization of women's groups and the local women's groups or fujinakai. Chifuren works on a regional scope on a variety of social and political issues facing women in Japan.

== History ==
Shigeri Yamataka became involved in Chifuren in 1952, when Chifuren was formed. Yamataka had previously been involved with women's groups or fujinakai which helped make up part of Chifuren. The activist tradition of Chifuren was based on the idea of ryōsai kenbo, meaning "good wife, wise mother." Millions of women joined the group, united under the ideas of improving women's lives, reforming both home and society and creating social welfare.

Chifuren opposed revisions to the postwar Constitution and Civil Code of 1948 that would put women, their real property and their families under legal control of a family patriarch. In 1955, Chifuren and the Housewives Association founded the New Life Campaign Association, which was seen by Yamataka as a "movement by and for women."

During the 1960s, Chifuren, along with the YWCA, Japanese League of Women Voters, the Women's Bar Association of Japan and the Christian Women's Temperance Union all "independently declared their opposition to nuclear armaments." Chifuren fought for environmental changes and fought against pollution in the late 1960s and early 1970s.
