= Kubushiro Ochimi =

Japanese suffragist

- 久布白落実
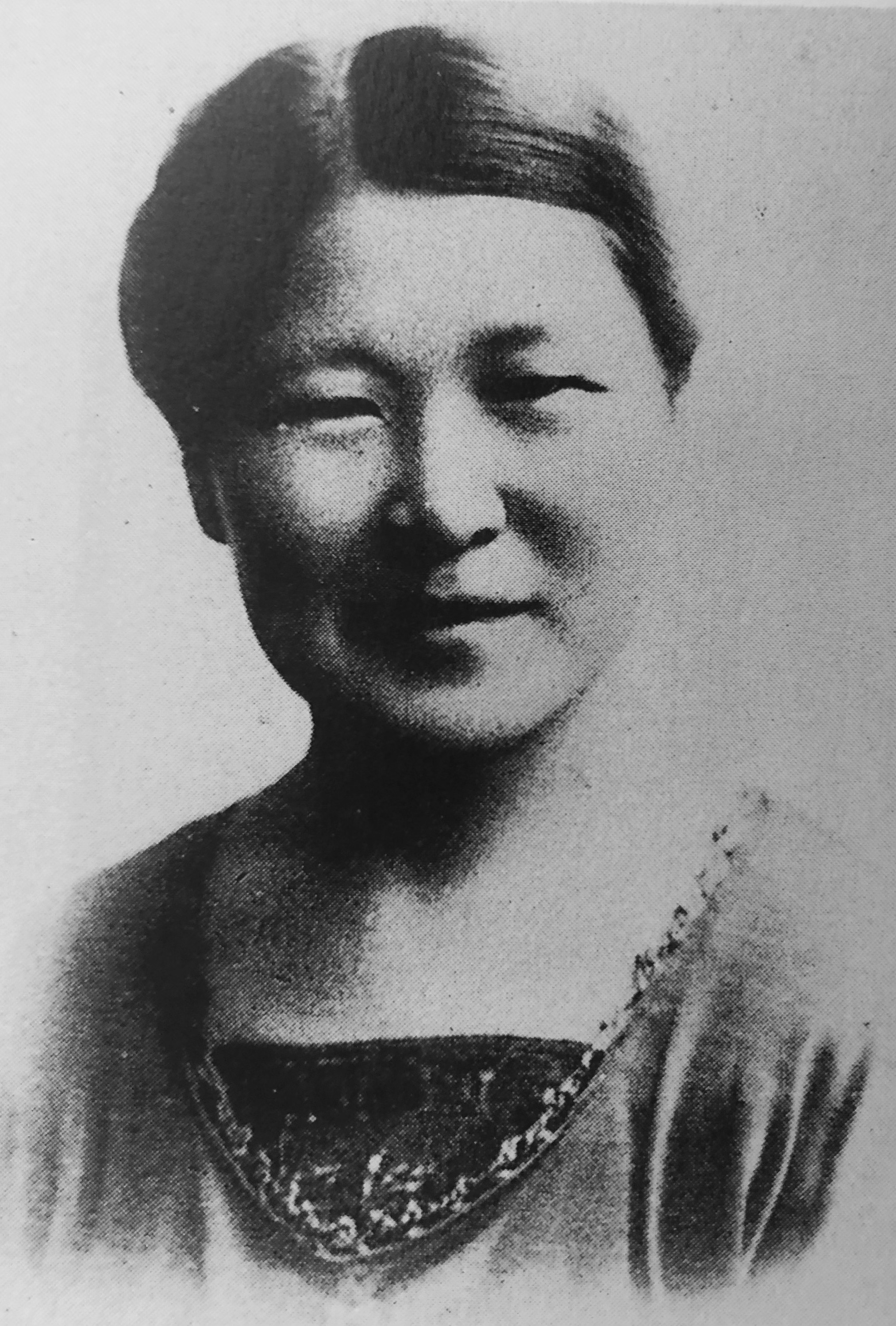
- Kubushiro Ochimi
- Born: 16 December 1882; Yamaga, Kumamoto Prefecture, Japan
- Died: 23 October 1972 (aged 89)
- Occupations: Suffragist, feminist
- Relatives: Yajima Kajiko (great-aunt)

Kubushiro Ochimi (16 December 1882 – 23 October 1972; in Japanese, 久布白落実, or くぶしろ おちみ in kana) was a Japanese religious leader, temperance activist, and feminist. She was president of the Japanese Women's Christian Temperance Union, and general director of the Women's Suffrage League in Japan.

== Early life and education ==
Okubo Ochimi was born in present-day Yamaga, Kumamoto Prefecture, the daughter of Shinjiro Okubo and Otoha; her father was a Christian pastor who established churches for Japanese Christians in Hawaii and California. Her great-aunt was temperance activist Yajima Kajiko. She graduated from a Presbyterian high school in Tokyo in 1903, and visited the United States with her parents as a young woman. She graduated from Pacific Theological Seminary in 1909.

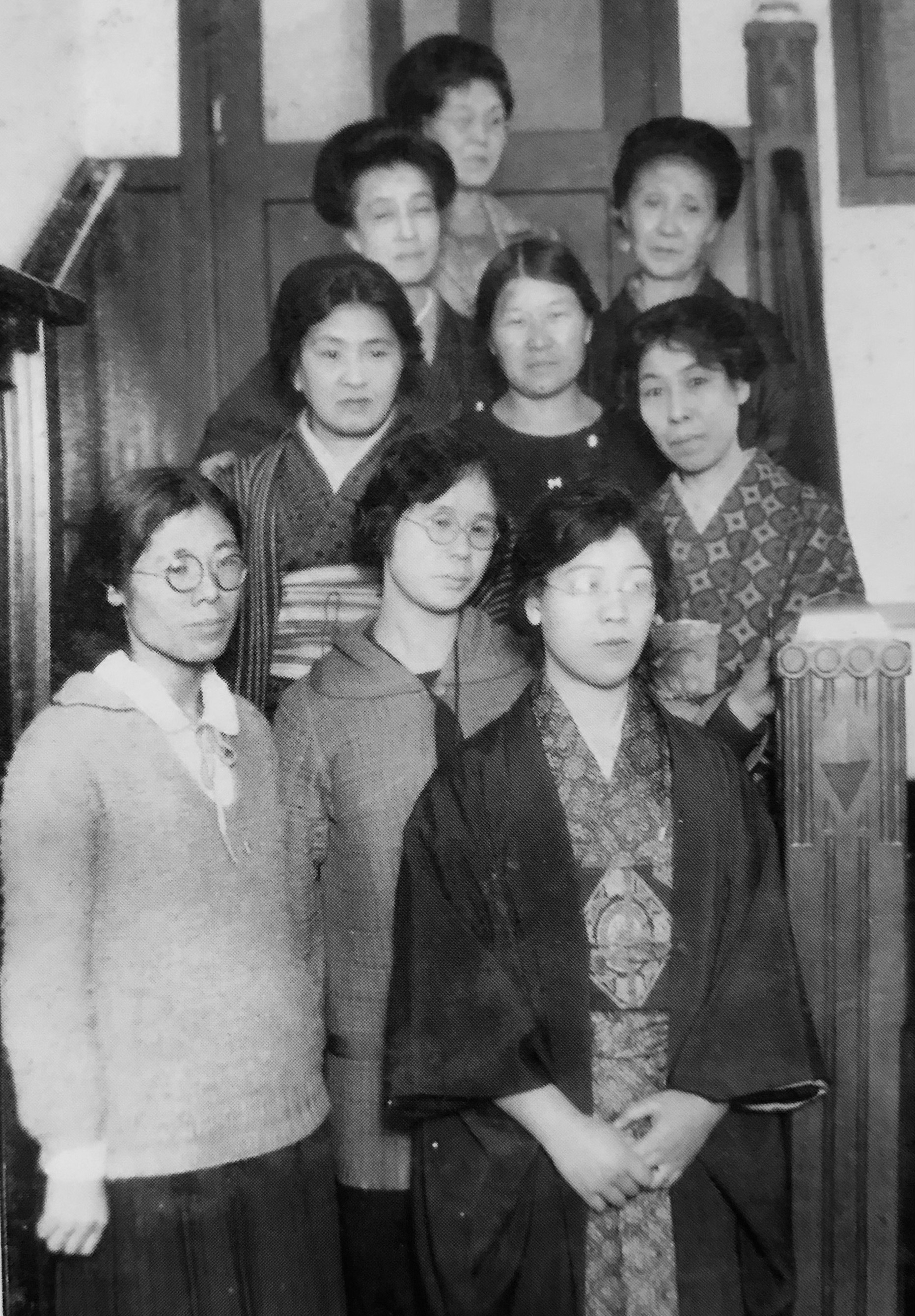
On December 13, 1926, the 2nd anniversary of the Women's Suffrage League was held. Front row, from left: Fusae Ichikawa, Shigeri Kaneko, Etsuko Ohira. Middle row, from left: Kiiko Yagihashi, Ochimi Kubushiro, Mako Ogihara. Back row, from left: Yoshiko Tanaka, Shigeyo Takeuchi, Kyoko Okada.

== Career ==
She was in California for the 1906 San Francisco earthquake, and worked as an interpreter for relief efforts there. She returned to Japan with her husband in 1913, and was a pastor with him in Osaka, Takamatsu, and Tokyo. They founded the Tokyo Citizens Church together. In 1916, she became active in temperance work, and joined efforts to eliminate licensed prostitution in the red light districts of Tokyo. In 1922, she was a delegate to the World Woman's Christian Temperance Union (WCTU) meeting in Philadelphia.

In 1924, Kubushiro was the founding general director of the Woman's Suffrage League, working with executive director Ichikawa Fusae. She was a founding member of the National Committee for Promoting the Abolition of Prostitution, in 1926. In 1930 she was one of the organizers of the first All-Japan Women's Conference (全国日本婦選大会). In 1935 she traveled in the United States to study sex education curricula. Kubushiro attended international Christian mission meetings in Jerusalem in 1928, and in India in 1938. From 1938 to 1960 she published a Christian women's magazine, Japan Through Women. She was president or vice-president of the Japanese Women's Christian Temperance Union from the 1920s into the 1960s.

After World War II, Kubushiro ran unsuccessfully for seats in the Japanese legislature, and chaired the Committee for the Promotion and Establishment of Legislation Banning Prostitution. In 1954, she served on the government's Policy Committee on the Prostitution Problem. She visited the United States in 1956, and China in 1957. In 1966 became an ordained minister in the United Church of Christ in Japan. She became a member of the Order of the Sacred Treasure, Third Class, in 1971. Also in 1971, she attended the Japanese government's ceremonies marking the 23rd anniversary of women's suffrage in Japan.

== Publications ==
- Japanese Women Speak: A Message from the Christian Women of Japan to the Christian Women of America (1934, in English, with Kawai Michi)
- "The Place of the Christian Church in Moral and Social Reform in Japan" (1939)
- The Life of Yajima Kajiko (矢島楫子伝) (1942)
- The Road to the Abolition of Prostitution (廃娼ひとすじ) (1973, published posthumously)

== Personal life ==
In 1910, Ochimi married Naokatsu Kubushiro, a fellow Japanese Christian in California. Her husband died in 1920, and she died in 1972, at the age of 89.
