= Women's suffrage in Japan =

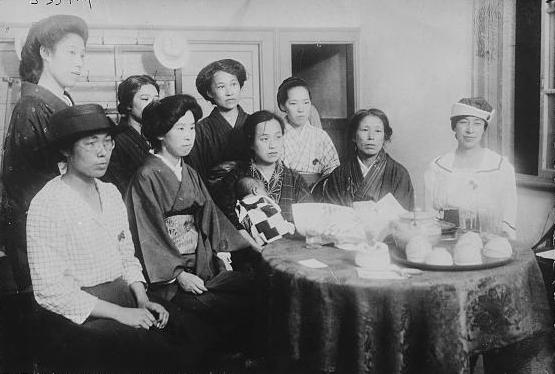
A suffragette meeting in Tokyo

Women's suffrage in Japan can trace its beginnings to democratization brought about by the Meiji Restoration, with the suffrage movement rising to prominence during the Taisho period. The Meiji Restoration led to the creation of the Japanese feminist movement which allowed for the fight for and eventually the granting of women's suffrage in Japan. The prohibition of women from political meetings had been abolished in 1922 after demands from women's organizations led by activists such as Hiratsuka Raichō and Ichikawa Fusae. The movement suffered heavy setbacks during and after the Great Depression, when support for democracy began to wane and military influence over civilians increased dramatically. The first election by universal suffrage without distinction of sex was held in 1946, but it was not until 1947, when the constitution for post-war Japan came into effect, that universal suffrage was established in Japan.

== History ==
After the Meiji Restoration in 1868, the concept of human rights and universal suffrage began to take hold in Japan. During the late 19th century, the first proponents for women's rights advocated, not for political inclusion or voting rights, but for reforms in the patriarchal society oppressing women. Of prime importance to the early feminist movement was the call for women's education. Policymakers believed that this was imperative to the preservation of the state, as it would prepare girls to become effective wives and mothers capable of producing diligent, patriotic sons.

Although policymakers did not necessarily have the same motives as women's rights advocates in their call for women's education, the availability of education opened the door for further advancements for women in Japanese society. As the idea of women becoming skilled and prudent individuals, whether in the workforce or through education, this modern concept was soon accepted in addition to its interrelationship with excellent and pure motherhood. Continuing the fight for women's rights in Japan at the end of the 19th century there was a push to protect women from patriarchal practices and policies. These practices included prostitution and polygamy which had long subjected many women to abuse, and lead to long and lasting impacts including the prevalence of sexually transmitted diseases.

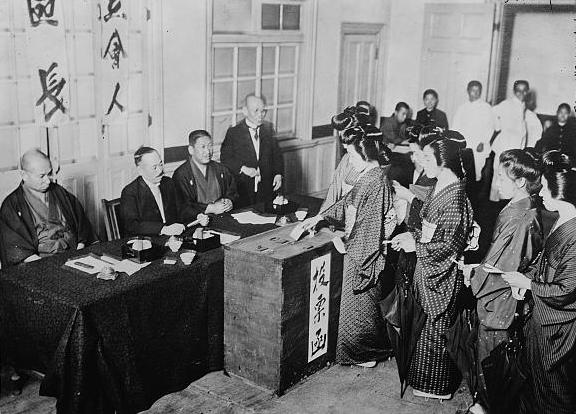
Women voting in Japan during the Taishō period

Feminists began to oppose both the exclusive provision of civil rights for men and the exclusion of women from politics. Women in Japan were prohibited, by law, from joining political parties, expressing political views, and attending political meetings. By 1920, the fight for women's political inclusion was at the forefront of the suffrage movement. In 1921, the Diet of Japan (parliament) made an amendment to Article 5 of the Police Security Act which granted women the right to attend political meetings, however, women were still not able to join political parties.

The ban on women's involvement in political parties was not altered, as many members of the Diet felt that it was selfish for women to forsake their families for government. Feminists were still determined to fight for political equality. The League for the Realisation of Woman Suffrage was founded in 1924, the year before the Japanese government enacted the Universal Manhood Suffrage Law, which gave the vote to all men 25 years or older, but did not extend the vote to women. In 1925 it changed its name to the Woman Suffrage League of Japan (婦選獲得同盟, Fusen Kakutoku Dōmei).

After women were granted the right to participate in political assemblies, there was a surge in numbers of women's interest groups. Alumni groups, Christian missionary groups, and other women's auxiliary groups began to sprout during the inter-war period. After an earthquake struck Tokyo in 1923, representatives from 43 of these organizations joined forces to become the Tokyo Federation of Women's Organizations (Tokyo Rengo Fujinkai). The federation was designed to serve as disaster relief to aid those affected by the earthquake; however, it went on to become one of the largest women's activist groups of the time.

To efficiently address the issues affecting women, the Tokyo Federation of Women's Organizations divided into five satellite groups: society, government, education, labor, and employment. The government sector was perhaps the most significant, as it spawned the League for the Realization of Women's Suffrage (Fujin Sanseiken Kakutoku Kisei Domei), later the Women's Suffrage League (Fusen Kakutoku Domei), which became the most influential and outspoken women's advocacy collective of the era. The government satellite issued a manifesto outlining the abuses Japanese women suffered and how they were to be corrected:

1) It is our responsibility to destroy customs which have existed in this country for the past twenty six hundred years and to construct a new Japan that promotes the natural rights of men and women;

2) As women have been attending public school with men for half a century since the beginning of the Meiji period and our opportunities in higher education have continued to expand, it is unjust to exclude women from international suffrage;

3) Political rights are necessary for the protection of nearly four million working women in this country;

4) Women who work in the household must be recognized before the law to realize their full human potential;

5) Without political rights we cannot achieve public recognition at either the national or local level of government;

6) It is both necessary and possible to bring together women of different religions and occupations in a movement for women's suffrage.

In 1931 the Hamaguchi bill although passed by the House of Commons was rejected by the House of Peers. The bill was sponsored by the cabinet of Prime Minister Hamaguchi Osachi. If it passed the bill would have given women over the age of 25 the ability to vote in local elections and to hold local office if their husbands gave them permission.

The League for the Realization of Women's Suffrage, as well as numerous other groups, continued to fight for social and political inclusion, as well as legal protection from the patriarchal traditions that continued in Japan. Women were finally granted the right to vote in 1947, after a US-drafted constitution came into effect and restored the influence of Japan's democratic system. Along with the right to vote the Japanese constitution also declared many other developments to women's rights in Japan both legally and politically.

Legally, Japanese women were granted the right to vote in 1947; however, in April of 1946 the first election where Japanese women were able to vote was held. In addition to being able to vote in this election there were women who ran for and were elected into office.

== Key individuals ==
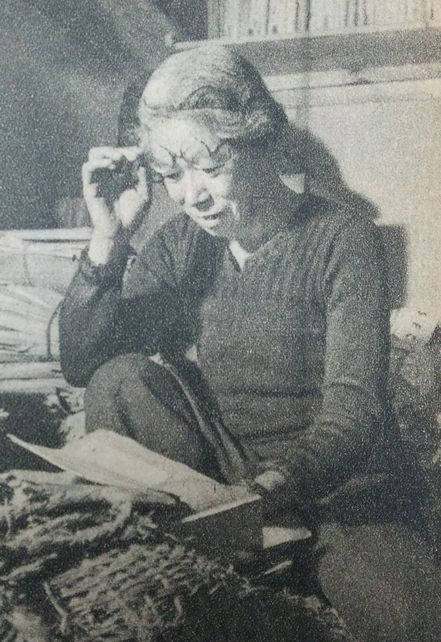
Ichikawa Fusae in 1947

Shidzue Katō: (1897–2001) As a member of the Japanese Socialist Party, Shidzue Kato was the first woman elected to the Imperial Diet. She spent the majority of her life fighting for women's reproductive and political rights. She is noted for annulling her marriage and remarrying, an act that was extremely rare for women at the time.

Fusae Ichikawa: (1893–1981) Advocate for women's political rights. Ichikawa concentrated most of her efforts towards gaining women the right to participate in the voting process and in political parties. With Hiratsuka Raicho, she helped establish the New Woman Association. Her involvement extended to the Patriotic Press Association and the League for Women's Suffrage (Fusen Kakutoku Domei). Ichikawa traveled to the United States shortly after World War I and observed the advancements American women such as Alice Paul had made in the fight for equality and political rights. She returned to Japan, remained an outspoken voice for women's rights, and was elected to the Japan's House of Councillors in the 1950s.

Shigeri Yamataka: (1899-1977) Worked closely with Ichikawa in the Women's Suffrage League. After World War II, she was twice elected to the House of Councillors, the upper house of the Diet of Japan, and was a president of the National Federation of Regional Women's Organizations, Chifuren, until her death in 1977.

Hiratsuka Raichō: (1886–1971) Women's rights advocate who was key in the founding of the Shin Fujin Kyokai, or New Woman Association, in 1919. Hiratsuka was noted for her belief that achieving the rights of inclusion in all aspects of Japanese society would have to be secondary to unifying women as a class.

== Political participation ==
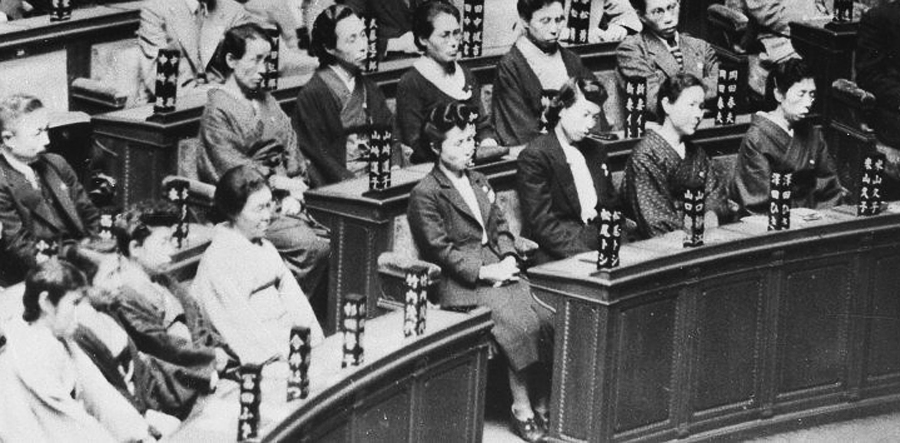
The first women in the Japanese Diet, 1946

In 1890, the first session of the Imperial Diet issues the Law on Assembly and Political Association (shukai oyobi seishaho), which is the first government issued decree banning women from joining political parties. In 1921, the Diet voted to overrule this decree allowing women to attend political meetings. With constraints prohibiting women from actively participating in politics, women's interest groups and other advocates continued to persevere for voting and inclusion rights. This was realized on December 15, 1945, when the election law was revised, allowing women over the age of twenty to vote in elections.

== Literary activism ==
One of the most effective ways in which women were active in the suffrage movement was through literary outlets. During the interwar period, the number of educated women in Japan was at its highest. These women, many of whom were graduates of Japan's finest institutions of higher learning, began using their education as a weapon in the fight against oppression.

Literary serials such as Seito, Fujin Koron, and Shufu No Tomo were the most popular feminist magazines of the time. In addition to suffrage, they often tackled issues such as abortion, sexuality, politics, and independence. Such magazines sometimes included western literary works that were often deemed controversial to the largely conservative Japanese population.

== Traditional roles ==
Tradition calls for Japanese women to serve as willing subordinates to men. One of the most popular sayings of the time was ryosai kenbo, which means "good wife, wise mother". This subservient role can be traced to the widely accepted and revered teachings of Hayashi Razan, who developed a Confucian school of thought that emphasized superiority and inferiority in certain relationships. According to this school of thought, the relationship between husband and wife relied upon a woman fully devoting herself to the needs and success of her husband. Hayashi Razan's teachings, although developed during the seventeenth century, were the basis of the Japanese social and cultural structure for centuries.

== Workforce ==
Women traditionally were to focus all of their efforts to the maintenance and development of their households, and their work was limited to domestic and agricultural tasks. With the evolution of Japan as a growing industrialized nation and with the reformation of Japanese society, women became the majority in newly built factories that became necessary to support Japan's booming textile industry. Although these women were allowed to leave their homes and earn wages, they were still held captive by patriarchal constraints.

Many women in the workforce had been sent by their families to work in factories that would send their earnings back to their homes. They were provided room and board for the duration of their employment, but the conditions where they lived and worked were deplorable and resulted in widespread illness and disease. The conditions, their mediocre salaries, and their risk of developing life-threatening medical conditions were the driving force behind the suffrage movement's desire to improve the state of the workplace for women.

Due to theses insufferable and hazardous work conditions, women, especially textile workers, begun to join the Friendly Society (Yuaikai) later named the Japan Federation of Labor (Nihon Rōdō Sodomei or Sōdōmei), in order to combat the numerous inequalities. With long agonizing hours, constant sexual harassment, and insufficient wages, industrialized women workers of Japan suffered tremendously. Despite the patriarchal ideology categorizing women as "auxiliary members" and "secondary wage earners" of the friendly society, a multitude of women remained eager to fight for justifiable and fair wages.

== See also ==
- Women in Japan
- Feminism in Japan
- Overview of gender inequality in Japan
- Timeline of women's suffrage
- List of suffragists and suffragettes
