= New Japan Women's League =

The New Japan Women's League (NJWL or Shin Nihon Fujin Dōmei) was a non-partisan women's organization in Japan formed by Fusae Ichikawa on November 3, 1945, after WWII. The NJWL was established to improve women's legal status in Japan, gain women's suffrage, develop policies for women's lives, education and work, and inform Japanese women about democracy and citizenship. The NJWL was influenced by pre-World War II suffrage organizations and did not mention gender equality or women in the workforce in its founding principles. NJWL and Ichikawa worked to "struggle against conservative social taboos." NJWL lobbied the government over laws and policies that were unequal in treatment of men and women. In 1950, New Japan Women's League was renamed to the Women's Suffrage League of Japan. Thereafter, Women's Suffrage League of Japan had the basic principles of "equality, welfare, political purification, and permanent world peace" and promoted movements that connect between women and the Diet.

== History of the establishment New Japan Women's League ==
In Japan, voting and joining associations were completely banned for women in 1889 after the establishment of the Constitution of the Japan Empire by the Assembly Regulations and Peace Police Act. In 1905, socialist women started an opposition movement to reform the law and get rid of the ban. Later named the New Women's Association, in 1919 the socialist women's organization succeeded in partly revising the Peace Police Act. In 1945, one of the members of New Women's Association, Fusae Ichikawa, established a new organization for women's suffrage movement, called the New Japan Women's League. The New Japan Women's League temporary declined because Ichikawa was purged by order of the General Headquarters of the Allied Forces in April 1947, but she was released from the purge and came back to the New Japan Women's League in October 1950. She renamed to the Women's Suffrage League of Japan in November 1950 and promoted women's movements.

== Goals ==
The main goals of New Japan Women's League were:

- Abolition movement of legal system against women
- Political education movement for exercising of women's suffrage more effectively
- Establishment of policy related to women's life, education, and labor

== Achievements ==
New Japan Women's League (NJWL) put a headquarters in Tokyo and opened 35 branches all over Japan. The president of New Japan Women's League, Fusae Ichikawa, had started a movement that interested a large number of Japanese women in politics and improved their knowledge of politics since November 3, 1945, and gathered about 3000 women to the NJWL. Women in NJWL and Ichikawa also shaped a plan of women's suffrage with the 43rd Prime Minister Higashikuni, and the politician Ichiro Hatoyama. The 44th Prime Minister Shidehara adapted women's suffrage in a cabinet decision and Home Minister Zenjiro Horikiri submitted the women suffrage bill of the House of Representative Election Law to the Diet on November 17, 1945. It was passed and women who are over 20 years of age voted for the first time under the Revised Election Law. The president of New Japan Women's League, Ichikawa, said in an interview, "Without the Occupation or the defeat of Japan, the realization of the Japanese women's constitutional rights would not have been achieved so quickly."
