= Dōshikai (1960–1962) =

Former political party in Japan

The Dōshikai (Japanese: 同志会, lit. Fellow Thinkers' Association) was a political party in Japan.

== History ==
The party was established in January 1960 by 11 members of the House of Councillors who had previously been members of the Ryokufūkai. It won only two seats in the House of Councillors election on 1 July 1962, and was reduced to seven seats in the chamber. As a result of losing its status as a "bargaining group" it merged with the Mushozoku Club members to form the Dai-Niin Club later in July.
