= Dai-Niin Club =

Defunct Japanese political party

The Dai-Niin Club (Japanese: 第二院クラブ, lit. 'Second Chamber Club') was a political party in Japan.

== History ==
The party was established in the House of Councillors in July 1962 by a merger of the Dōshikai and five Councillors from the Mushozoku Club. The merger was prompted by the Dōshikai losing its "bargaining group" status after being reduced to seven seats in the elections earlier in the month.

In March 1964 three of its councillors left to join the Liberal Democratic Party and others broke away to reform the Ryokufūkai. The party held four seats after the 1965 House of Councillors elections and had become an all-woman faction. Following the 1968 elections it disbanded.
