= Fusen Kakutoku Dōmei =

The Fusen Kakutoku Dōmei (婦選獲得同盟; FKD), originally named Fujin Sanseiken Kakutoku Kisei Dōmei, was a Japanese women's rights organisation, founded in 1924. Its purpose was to work for the introduction of women's suffrage.

The FKD was founded as a section of the umbrella organisation Tōkyō Rengō Fujinkai, which was founded in 1923 to unite the Japanese women's organisations in their emergency work for the victims of the Kanto earthquake of 1923. When male suffrage was introduced in 1924, the Tōkyō Rengō Fujinkai divided in to several groups, which was each given their own assignment within women's issues. The FKD was one of these sub-groups and its purpose was women's suffrage. One of the leaders of the group was Ichikawa Fusae.
