= Ryokufūkai (1947–1960) =

Defunct political party in Japan

The Ryokufūkai (Japanese: 緑風会, "Green Breeze Society") was a political party in Japan.

== History ==
The Ryokufūkai was established in May 1947 by a group of 74 members of the Senate, and within a month, a further 18 senators had joined it, meaning it was the largest faction in the Senate. Its formation was an attempt to continue the House of Peers' tradition of discussing issues in a non-partisan way in the new upper house.

However, the gradual development of a party system made it increasingly difficult for the Ryokufūkai candidates to be elected. The party won only nine seats in the June 1950 elections, reducing it to 50 senators. It won 16 seats in the 1953 elections and five in the 1956 elections, by which time it had been reduced to 31 seats in total. It won six seats in the 1959 elections, meaning it had only 11 seats in total. In January 1960 it was dissolved and replaced by the Dōshikai.
