= 1962 Japanese House of Councillors election =

- 1 July 1962

127 of the 250 seats in the House of Councillors 126 seats needed for a majority
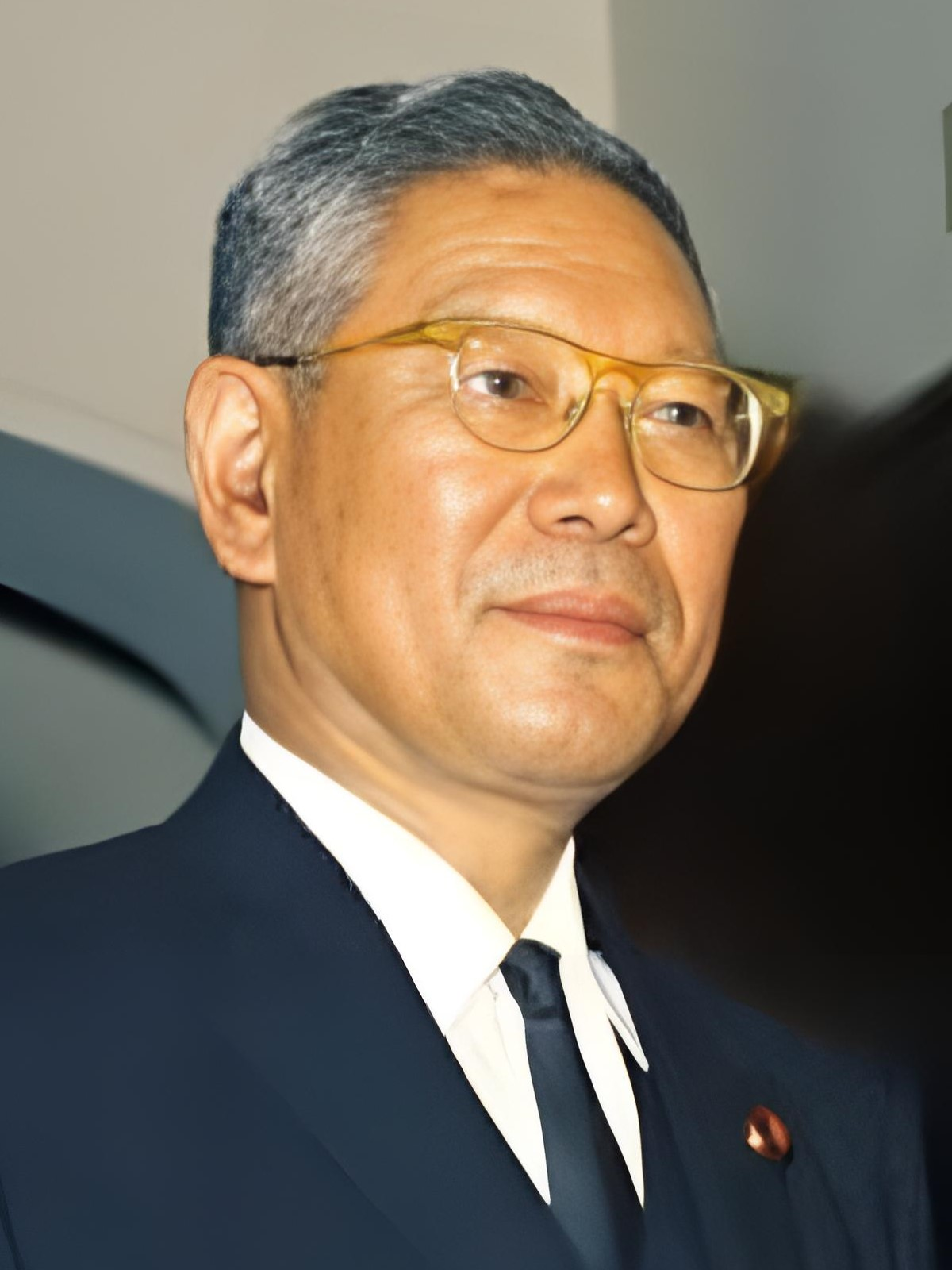

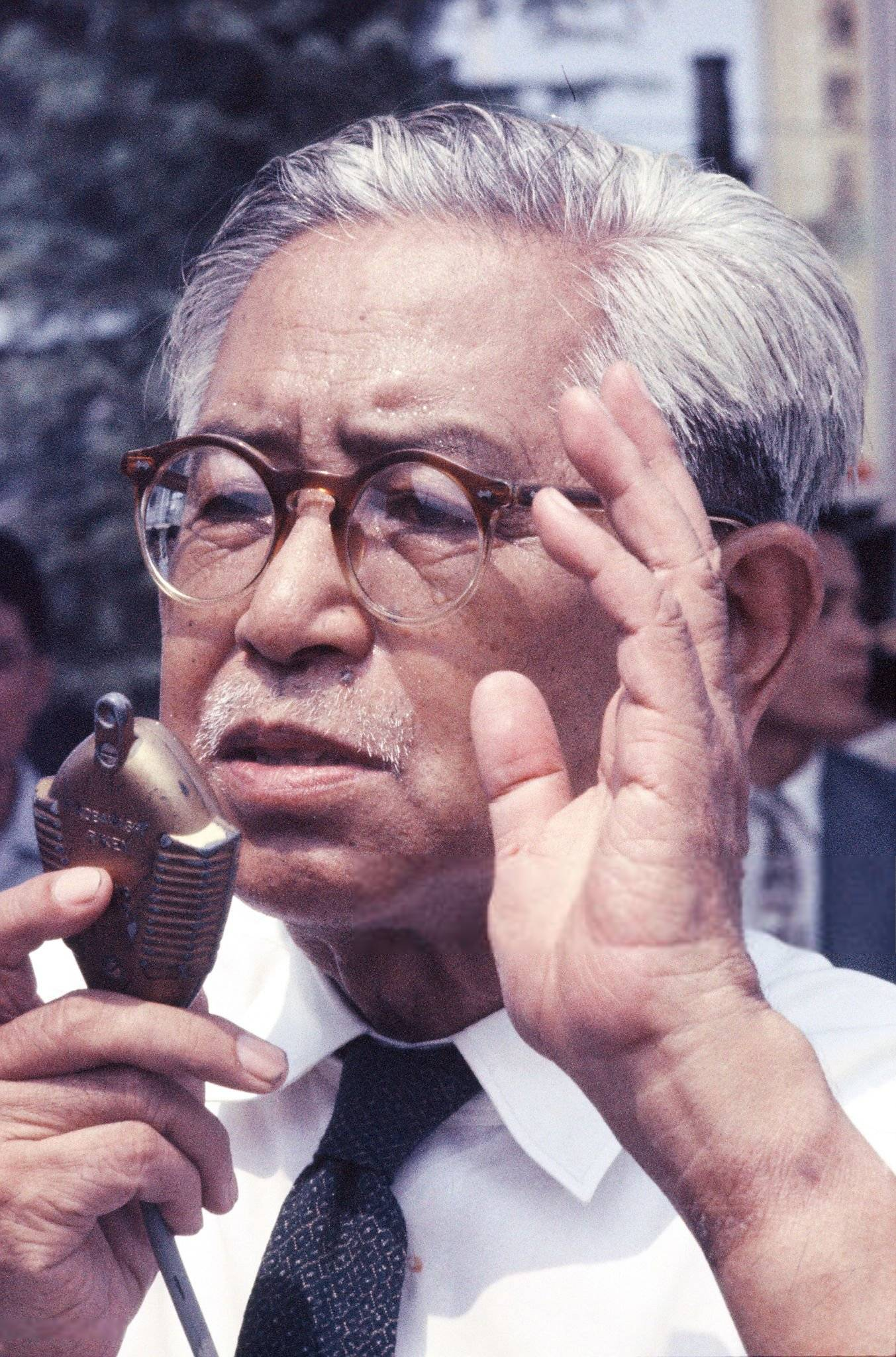

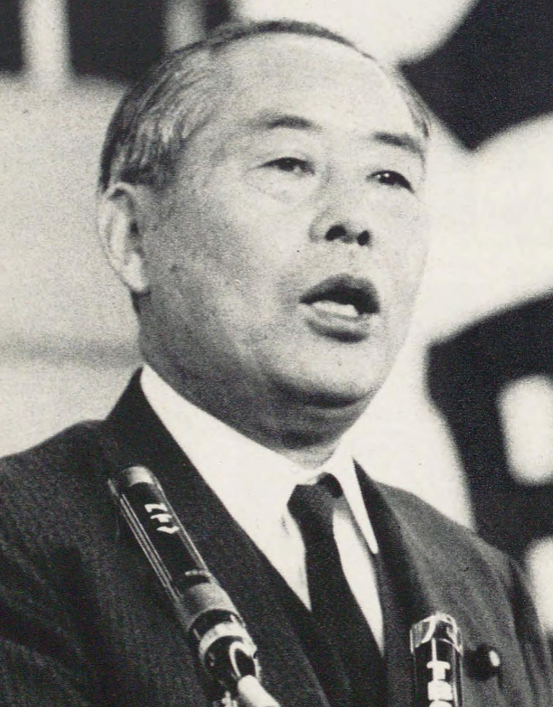

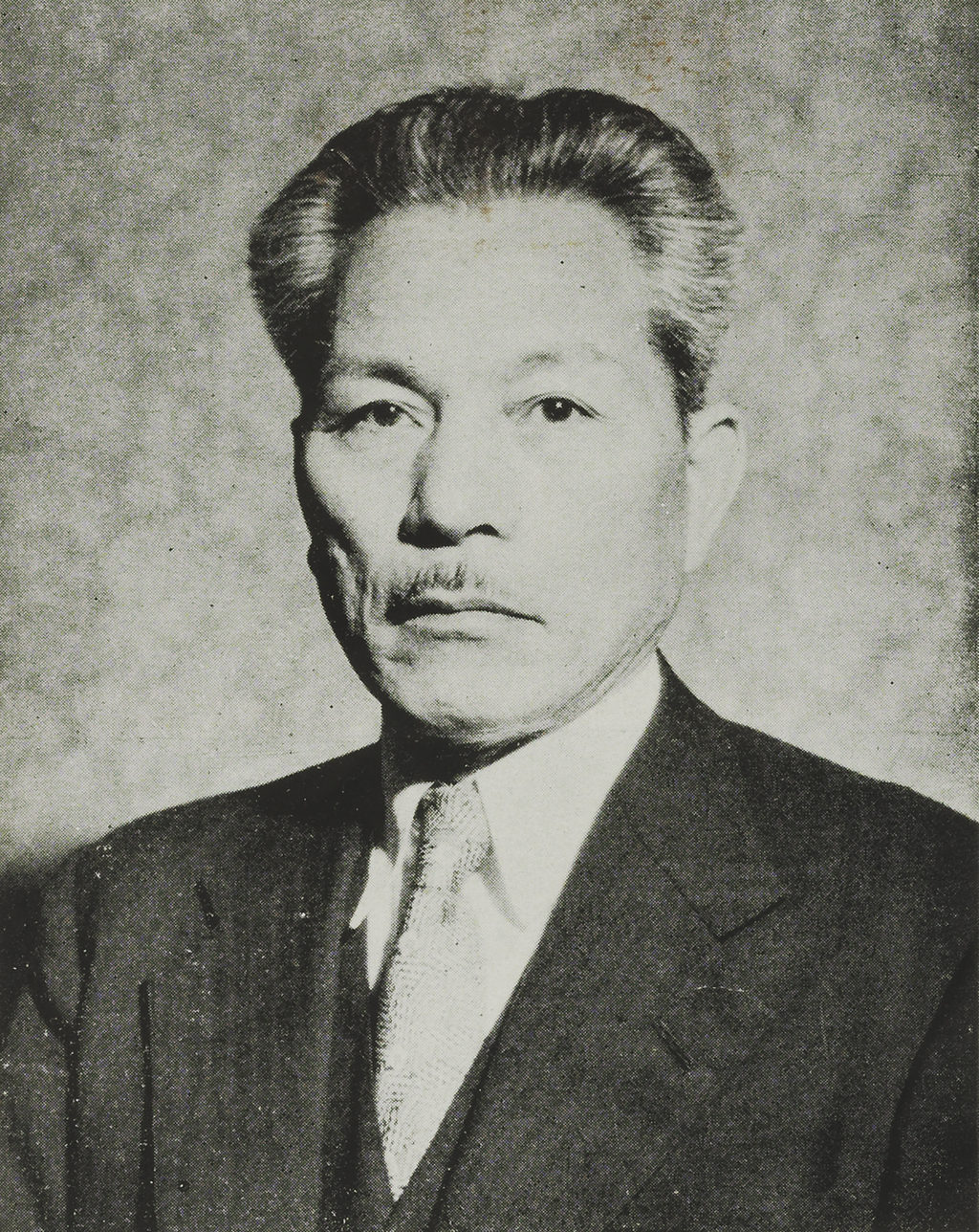
	First party	Second party	Third party
Leader	Hayato Ikeda	Jōtarō Kawakami	Kōji Harashima
Party	LDP	Socialist	Kōmeitō
Seats after	142	66	15
Seat change	▲10	▼19	▲15
Popular vote	16,581,637	8,666,910	4,124,269
Percentage	46.4%	24.2%	11.5%
Swing	▲5.2%	▼2.3%	N/A
	Fourth party	Fifth party	Sixth party
Leader	Suehiro Nishio	–	Kenji Miyamoto
Party	Democratic Socialist	Dōshikai	JCP
Seats after	11	7	4
Seat change	▲11	▼4	▲1
Popular vote	1,899,756	1,660,466	1,123,947
Percentage	5.3%	4.6%	3.1%
Swing	N/A	▼3.4%	▲1.2%
- Results of the election, showing the winning candidates in each prefecture and the national block.
President of the House of Councillors before election
Tarō Hirai
LDP
President of the House of Councillors-designate
Yōtoku Shigemasa
LDP

House of Councillors elections were held in Japan on 1 July 1962, electing half the seats in the House. The Liberal Democratic Party won the most seats. This was the first Japanese national election to feature the Kōmeitō as a candidate, as it had formed earlier in the same year.

As is typical for House of Councillors elections, candidate personality and public appeal played a stronger role than they would in a House of Representatives election; the first place winner for the national district voting was Aki Fujiwara, a panelist on the Japanese version of I've Got a Secret, who broke all of the previous House of Councillors records by obtaining 1,160,000 votes.

The Japan Socialist Party (JSP) had attempted to make questions of constitutional revision the main issue for the election, whereas the LDP attempted to sideline the issue by claiming that it would not pursue any constitutional amendments unless it were to receive recommendations from the Constitutional Investigation Commission, which was still in the process of deliberating at the time of the election. Overall, the JSP lost the most in this election, losing 19 seats, whereas the LDP gained 10 seats.

== Results ==
Party	National			Constituency			Seats			
Party	Votes	%	Seats	Votes	%	Seats	Not up	Won	Total after	+/–
Liberal Democratic Party	16,581,637	46.37	21	17,112,986	47.13	48	73	69	142	+10
Japan Socialist Party	8,666,910	24.24	15	11,917,675	32.82	22	29	37	66	–19
Kōmeitō	4,124,269	11.53	7	958,179	2.64	2	6	9	15	New
Democratic Socialist Party	1,899,756	5.31	3	2,649,422	7.30	1	7	4	11	New
Dōshikai	1,660,466	4.64	2	128,834	0.35	0	5	2	7	New
Japanese Communist Party	1,123,947	3.14	2	1,760,258	4.85	1	1	3	4	+1
Other parties	295,603	0.83	0	58,622	0.16	0	0	0	0	0
Independents	1,404,048	3.93	1	1,725,947	4.75	2	2	3	5	–13
Total	35,756,636	100.00	51	36,311,923	100.00	76	123	127	250	0
Valid votes	35,756,636	93.38		36,311,923	94.82					
Invalid/blank votes	2,534,276	6.62		1,983,299	5.18					
Total votes	38,290,912	100.00		38,295,222	100.00					
Registered voters/turnout	56,137,295	68.21		56,137,295	68.22					
Source: Ministry of Internal Affairs and Communications, National Diet

=== By constituency ===
Prefecture	Total seats	Seats won						
Prefecture	Total seats	LDP	JSP	Kōmeitō	DSP	JCP	Dōshikai	Ind.
Aichi	3	2	1					
Akita	1		1					
Aomori	1	1						
Chiba	2	1	1					
Ehime	1	1						
Fukui	1	1						
Fukuoka	3	2	1					
Fukushima	2	1	1					
Gifu	1	1						
Gunma	2	1	1					
Hiroshima	2	1	1					
Hokkaido	4	1	2					1
Hyōgo	3	2	1					
Ibaraki	2	1	1					
Ishikawa	1	1						
Iwate	1		1					
Kagawa	1	1						
Kagoshima	2	1	1					
Kanagawa	2		1		1			
Kōchi	1	1						
Kumamoto	2	2						
Kyoto	2	1	1					
Mie	1	1						
Miyagi	1	1						
Miyazaki	1	1						
Nagano	2	1	1					
Nagasaki	1	1						
Nara	1	1						
Niigata	2	1	1					
Ōita	1	1						
Okayama	2	1	1					
Osaka	3	1	1	1				
Saga	1	1						
Saitama	2	1	1					
Shiga	1	1						
Shimane	1							1
Shizuoka	2	2						
Tochigi	2	1	1					
Tokushima	1	1						
Tokyo	5	2	1	1		1		
Tottori	1	1						
Toyama	1	1						
Wakayama	1	1						
Yamagata	1	1						
Yamaguchi	1	1						
Yamanashi	1	1						
National	51	21	15	7	3	2	2	1
Total	127	69	37	9	4	3	2	3
