= Ichikawa Fusae =

Japanese feminist politician (1893–1981)

- 市川 房枝
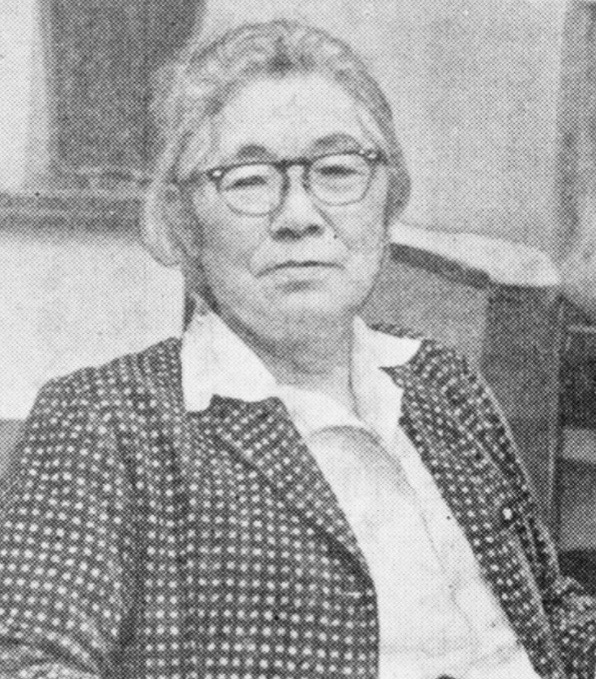
- Fusae in 1960

Member of the House of Councillors
- In office 8 July 1974 – 11 February 1981
- Constituency: National district
- In office 3 May 1953 – 3 July 1971
- Constituency: Tokyo at-large

Personal details
- Born: 15 May 1893 Nakashima, Aichi, Japan
- Died: 11 February 1981 (aged 87) Shibuya, Tokyo, Japan
- Party: Dai-Niin Club (1962–1981)
- Other political affiliations: Independent (1953–1962)
- Education: Aichi Prefectural Training Institution

Ichikawa Fusae (市川 房枝; May 15, 1893 – February 11, 1981) was a Japanese feminist, politician and a leader of the women's suffrage movement. Ichikawa was a key supporter of women's suffrage in Japan, and her activism was partially responsible for the extension of the franchise to women in 1945.

== Early life and education ==
Born in Bisai, Aichi Prefecture in 1893, Ichikawa was raised with an emphasis on education but also as a witness to her mother's physical abuse from her father. She attended the Aichi Women's Teacher Academy with the intention of becoming a primary school teacher. Upon her relocation to Tokyo in the 1910s, however, she became exposed to the women's movement. Returning to Aichi in 1917, she became the first woman reporter with the Nagoya Newspaper. In 1920 she co-founded the New Women's Association (新婦人協会, Shin-fujin kyokai) together with pioneering Japanese feminist Hiratsuka Raicho.

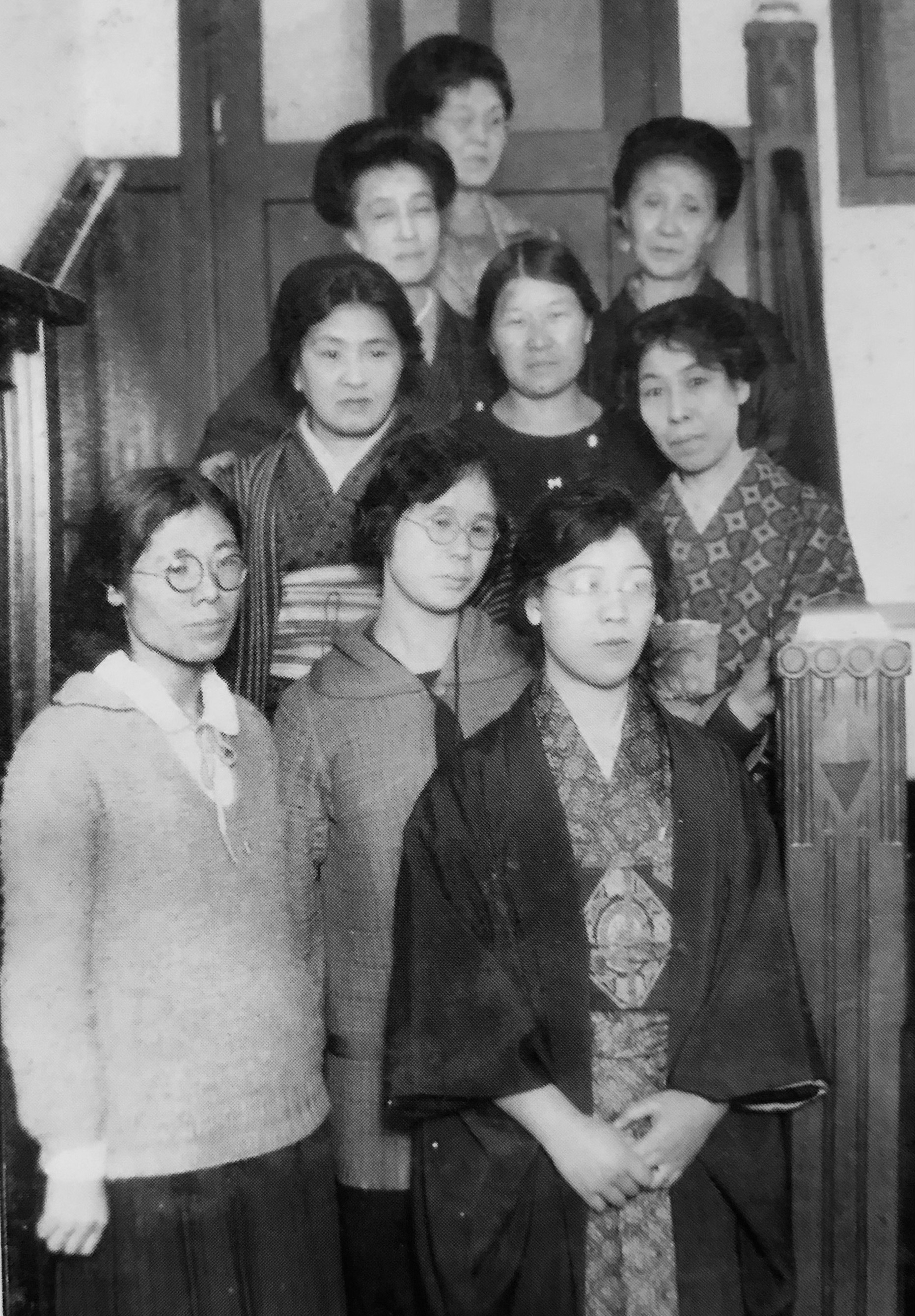
On December 13, 1926, the 2nd anniversary of the Women's Suffrage League was held. Front row, from left: Fusae Ichikawa, Shigeri Kaneko, Etsuko Ohira. Middle row, from left: Kiiko Yagihashi, Ochimi Kubushiro, Mako Ogihara. Back row, from left: Yoshiko Tanaka, Shigeyo Takeuchi, Kyoko Okada.

== Women's suffrage ==
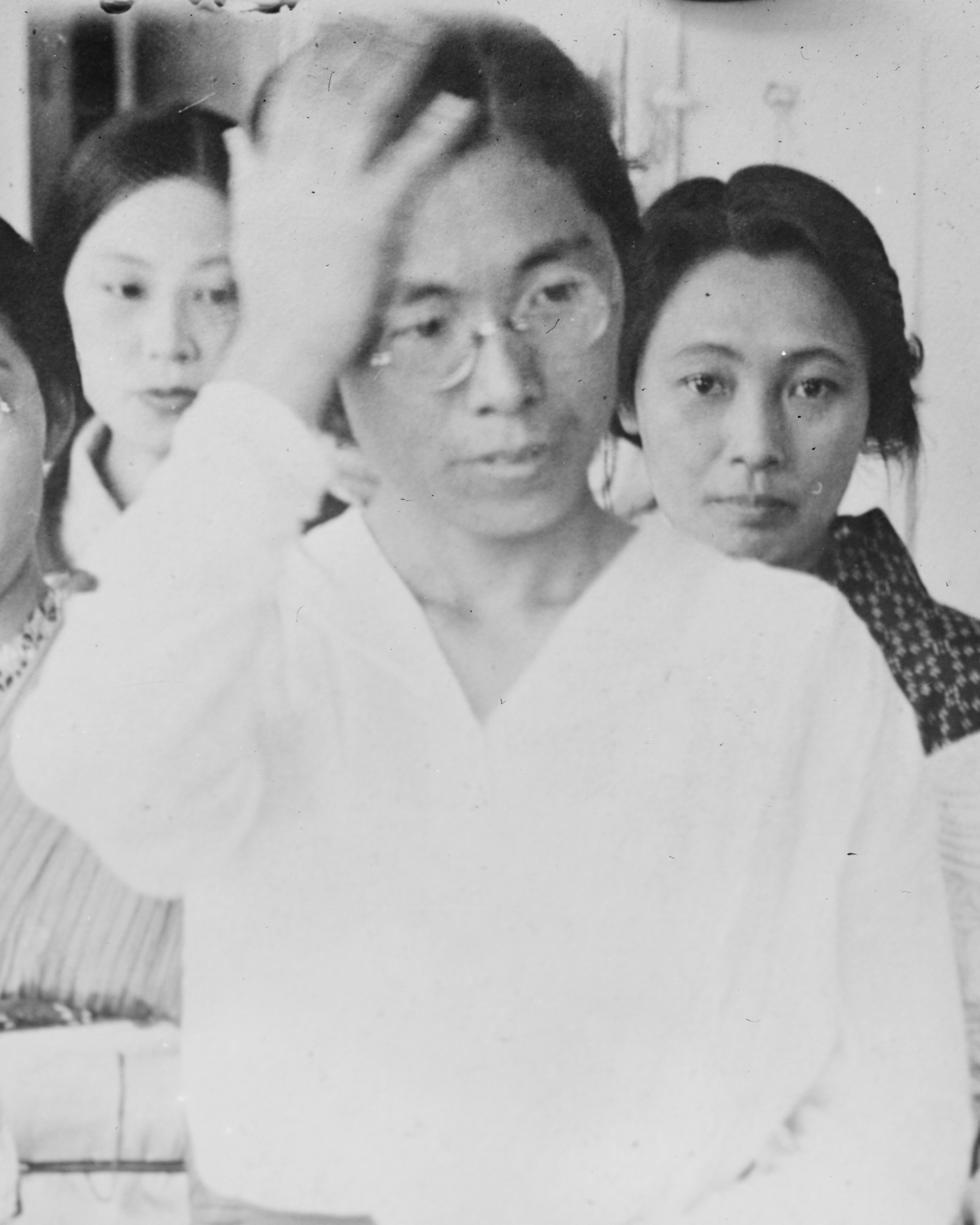
Ichikawa Fusae in 1920s

The New Women's Association was the first Japanese organization formed expressly for the improvement of the status and welfare of women. The organization, under Ichikawa's leadership, campaigned for changes in Japanese laws prohibiting the participation of women in politics. As women were barred from this sort of campaign (by the same law the organization sought to overturn), the organization held events known as "lecture meetings" to further their campaign. The law was eventually overturned by the Imperial Diet in 1922, after which the association disbanded.

Two years later, Ichikawa traveled to the United States, intent on making contact with American women's suffrage leader Alice Paul. Returning to Japan in 1924 to work for the Tokyo branch office of the International Labour Organization, she founded Japan's first women's suffrage organization, the Women's Suffrage League of Japan (日本婦人有権者同盟, Nippon fujin yûkensha dômei), which in 1930 held the country's first ever national convention on the enfranchisement of women in Japan. Ichikawa worked closely with Shigeri Yamataka, who went on to be elected to the House of Councillors.

The postwar occupation period saw Ichikawa play an important role in ensuring that women's suffrage was enshrined in Japan's postwar constitution, arguing that the political empowerment of women might have prevented Japan's entry into such a destructive war. The New Japan Women's League began its operation as an organization dedicated to winning suffrage for women, and Ichikawa was named the organization's first president.

Ichikawa's efforts, coupled with the requirements of the Potsdam Declaration, resulted in full suffrage for women in November 1945.

== Other activism ==
Other campaigns included efforts to curb the corruption of elections, which led to the 1933 Women's Association to Clean Tokyo Politics and the creation of an official government office, the Central Association to Clean Up Elections, to which Ichikawa was appointed as one of five female trustees. During World War II, Ichikawa was appointed secretary of the Central Association for National Spiritual Mobilization, an organization formed by the Japanese government for the purpose of increasing popular support for the Japanese war effort. She also served as trustee of the Great Japan Women's Association, which coordinated the efforts of private support organizations.

A tireless champion of women's issues, she would organize and participate in women's conferences in Japan and internationally, and in 1980 emerged as the leading voice in urging the Japanese government to ratify the Convention on the Elimination of All Forms of Discrimination against Women.

== Political career ==
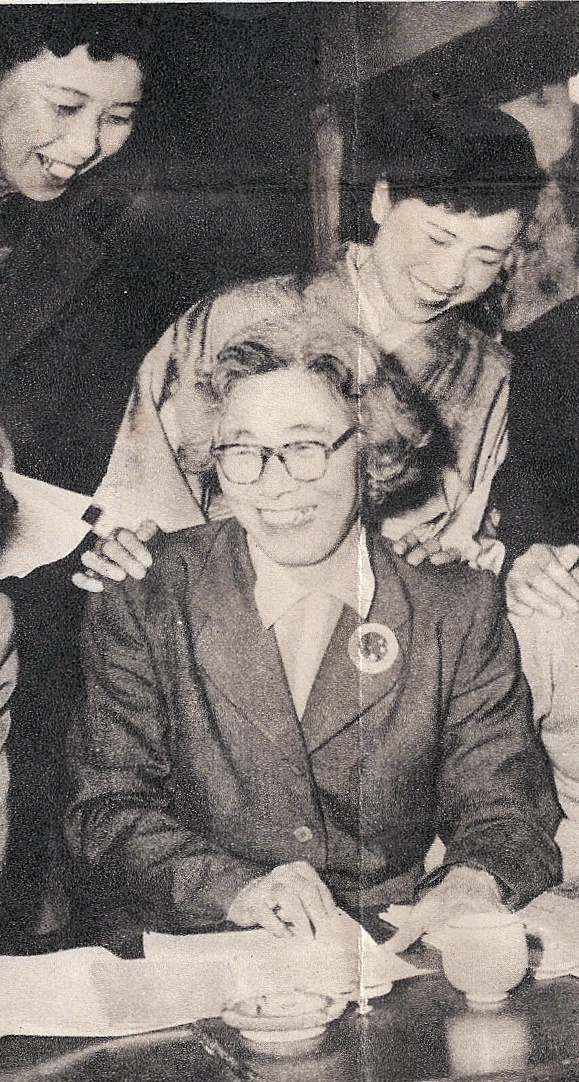
Ichikawa Fusae in 1953

After World War II, Ichikawa was initially purged and excluded from political or governmental offices by the occupation. She returned to politics after the occupation ended, and was elected to the Diet in 1953 as a representative of Tokyo. She continued to focus on issues important to women, as well as electoral reforms. She was re-elected twice, but failed in her next re-election bid, and left office in 1971.

In 1974, however, the then 81-year-old Ichikawa was asked to run again, and earned a fourth term in the Diet. She was re-elected to the House of Councillors in 1980, with the highest number of votes from the national constituency.

== Awards ==
Ichikawa was awarded the Ramon Magsaysay Award for Community Leadership in 1974 for her efforts in support of social equality.

== See also ==
- List of suffragists and suffragettes
- Timeline of women's suffrage
- Timeline of women's rights (other than voting)
- Women's suffrage in Japan

House of Councillors
Preceded by Tatsurō Sakurauchi; Suejirō Yoshikawa; Kiyoshi Shima; Takeo Kurokawa	Councillor for Tokyo's At-large district 1953–1971; Served alongside: Takeo Kurokawa, Sōji Okada, Kei Ishii, Yasu Kashiwabara, Kinjirō Aikawa, Sanzō Nosaka, Hiroshi Hōjō, Kihachirō Kimura	Succeeded by Bunbei Hara; Akira Kuroyanagi; Norio Kijima; Sanzō Nosaka
Preceded by 50-member SNTV district	Councillor for Japan's At-large district (zenkoku-ku); 1974–1981; Served alongside: numerous others	Succeeded by 50-member SNTV district
Honorary titles
Preceded by Kazuo Aoki	Oldest member of the House of Councillors of Japan; 1977-1981	Succeeded by Kingo Machimura
