= List of newspapers in Japan =

The first dailies were established in Japan in 1870. In 2018 the number of the newspapers was 103 in the country.

Below is a list of newspapers published in Japan. (See also Japanese newspapers.)

Big five national newspapers in Japan includes: The Asahi Shimbun, Yomiuri Shimbun, Mainichi Shimbun, Nihon Keizai Shimbun, and Sankei Shimbun.

== National papers ==
=== Big six ===
- Yomiuri Shimbun (daily) 5,856,320
- The Asahi Shimbun (daily) 3,391,003
- Chunichi Shimbun / Tokyo Shimbun (daily) about 2,100,000
- Mainichi Shimbun (daily) 1,499,571
- Nihon Keizai Shimbun (daily) 1,375,414
- Sankei Shimbun (daily) 849,791

== Hokkaido ==
=== Block papers of Hokkaido ===
- Hokkaido Shimbun

=== Regional papers of Hokkaido ===
- Sorachi
  - Kitasorachi Shimbun (Fukagawa)
  - Press Sorachi (Takikawa)
- Shiribeshi
  - Otaru Shimpō (Otaru)
- Iburi
  - Muroran Mimpō (Muroran)
  - Tomakomai Mimpō (Tomakomai)
- Hidaka
  - Hidaka Hōchi Shimbun (Urakawa)
- Oshima
  - Hakodate Shimbun (Hakodate)
- Kamikawa
  - Biei Shimbun (Biei)
  - Dōhoku Nippō (Shibetsu)
  - Hokuto Shimbun (Nayoro)
  - Nayoro Shimbun (Nayoro)
  - Nikkan Furano (Furano)
- Rumoi
  - Nikkan Rumoi Shimbun (Rumoi)
- Sōya
  - Nikkan Sōya (Wakkanai)
  - Wakkanai Press (Wakkanai)
- Okhotsk
  - Abashiri Times (Abashiri)
  - Bihoro Shimbun (Bihoro)
  - Hokkai Minyū Shimbun (Mombetsu)
  - Keizai no Denshobato (Kitami)
  - Kunneppu Shimpō (Kunneppu)
  - Memambetsu Shimbun (Ōzora)
  - Oketo Times (Oketo)
  - Tsubetsu Shimpō (Tsubetsu)
  - Yamanami (Engaru)
- Tokachi
  - Tokachi Mainichi Shimbun (Obihiro)
- Kushiro
  - Kushiro Shimbun (Kushiro)

=== Defunct newspapers of Hokkaido ===
  - Asahikawa Shimbun (Asahikawa, 1915 - 1943)
- Kitami Mainichi Shimbun (Kitami, 1950 – 1989)
- Akabira Shimpō (Akabira, 1962 – 1990)
- Nikkan Asahikawa Shimbun (Asahikawa, 1984 – 1992)
- Okhotsk Shimbun (Kitami, 1989 – 1993)
- Bibai Shimpō (Bibai, 1949 – 1996)
- Hokkai Times (prefecture paper, 1946 – 1998)
- Nahokkai Times (prefecture paper, 1946 – 1998)
- Kitami Gorjetsu (Kitami, 1912 – 2001)
- Abashiri Shimbun (Abashiri, 1947 – 2004)
- Mikasa Times (Mikasa, 1949 – 2007)
- Bibai Shimbun (Bibai, 1996 – 2007)
- Sorachi Times (Ashibetsu, 1950 – 2007)
- Shari Shimbun (Shari, 1979 – 2008)
- Ishikari Minyū Shimbun (Ishikari, 1988 – 2009)
- Sapporo Times (Sapporo, 1999 – 2009)
- Okhotsk Shimbun (former Mombetsu Shimbun, Mombetsu, 1958 – 2009)
- Nikkan Iwamizawa Shimbun (Iwamizawa, 1949 – 2009)
- Engaru Shimbun (Engaru, 1976 – 2015)
- Minamisorachi Shimpō (Kuriyama)
- Chitose Mimpō (Chitose)
- Yūbari Times (Yūbari)
- Nemuro Shimbun (Nemuro)
- Haboro Times (Haboro)

== Tōhoku region ==
=== Block paper of Tōhoku region ===
- Kahoku Shimpō

=== Prefecture papers of Tōhoku region ===
- Aomori
  - Tōō Nippō
- Iwate
  - Iwate Nippō
- Akita
  - Akita Sakigake Shimpō
- Yamagata
  - Yamagata Shimbun
- Fukushima
  - Fukushima Minpō

=== Regional papers of Tōhoku region ===
- Aomori
  - Daily Tōhoku (Hachinohe)
  - Mutsu Shimpō (Hirosaki)
  - Tsugaru Shimpō (Kuroishi)
- Iwate
  - Iwate Nichinichi Shimbun (Ichinoseki)
  - Morioka Times (Morioka)
  - Tankō Nichinichi Shimbun (Ōshū)
  - Tōkai Shimpō (Ōfunato)
- Miyagi
  - Ishinomaki Hibi Shimbun (Ishinomaki)
  - Ishinomaki Kahoku (Ishinomaki)
  - Ōsaki Times (Ōsaki)
  - Riasu no Kaze (Kesennuma)
  - Sanriku Shimpō (Kesennuma)
- Akita
  - Akita Mimpō (Daisen)
  - Hokuroku Shimbun (Ōdate)
  - Hokuu Shimpō (Noshiro)
  - Senboku Shimbun (Daisen)
- Yamagata
  - Shōnai Nippō (Tsuruoka)
- Fukushima
  - Abukuma Jihō (Sukagawa)
  - Fukushima Minyū (Fukushima)
  - Iwaki Mimpō (Iwaki)
  - Yūkan Yamatsuri (Yamatsuri)
  - Ōtsuchi Shimbun (Ōtsuchi)

=== Defunct newspapers of Tōhoku region ===
- Miyagi Times (Kesennuma, – 1995)
- Ishinomaki Shimbun (Ishinomaki, 1946 – 1998)
- Kamaishi Shimpō (Kamaishi, 1982 – 1999)
- Jōyō Shimbun (Minamisanriku, – 2007)
- Senpoku Shimbun (Naruko, – 2007)
- Iwate Tōkai Shimbun (Kamaishi, 1948 – 2011)
- Minamisanriku Shimbun (Minamisanriku, 2008 – 2011)
- Fujisato Shimbun (Fujisato, 1959 – 2012)
- Ōdate Shimpō (Ōdate, 1980 – 2015)
- Fukkō Kamaishi Shimbun (Kamaishi, 2011 – 2021)
- Yonezawa Shimbun (Yonezawa, 1879 – 2021)

== Kantō region ==
=== Prefecture papers of Kantō region ===
- Ibaraki
  - Ibaraki Shimbun
- Tochigi
  - Shimotsuke Shimbun
- Gunma
  - Jōmō Shimbun
- Saitama
  - Saitama Shimbun
- Chiba
  - Chiba Nippō
- Kanagawa
  - Kanagawa Shimbun

=== Regional papers of Kantō region ===
- Tochigi
  - Mōka Shimbun (Mōka)
- Gunma
  - Kiryū Times (Kiryū)
- Saitama
  - Bunka Shimbun (Hannō)
- Chiba
  - Bōnichi Shimbun (Tateyama)
- Kanagawa
  - Shinsei Mimpō (Odawara)
- Tōkyō
  - Nishitama Shimbun (Fussa)
  - Ogasawara Shimbun (Ogasawara)
  - Setagaya Shimbun (Setagaya)
  - Suginami Shimbun (Suginami)
  - Tama Tōkyō Nippō (Akishima)
  - Toshima Shimbun (Toshima)
  - Weekly News Nishi no Kaze (Oume)

=== Defunct newspapers of Kantō region ===
- Tōkyō Times (Kōtō, 1946 – 1992)
- Tochigi Shimbun (Utsunomiya, 1950 – 1996)
- Hitachi Mimpō (Hitachi, 1950 – 2000)
- Shin Ibaraki (Mito, 1952 – 2003)
- Nikkan Jōsō Shimbun (Chōshi, 1975 – 2009)
- Tama Newtown Times (Tama, 1969 – 2012)
- Bōsō Jiji Shimbun (Kisarazu, 1949 – 2012)
- Jōyō Shimbun (Tsuchiura, 1948 – 2013)
- Tokyo Nichi Nichi Shimbun (Tokyo, 1872 – 1943)
- Heimin Shinbun (Tokyo, 1903 – 1915)
- Nikkan Shimmimpō (Tokorozawa, 1952 – 2012)
- Nankai Times (Hachijō)

== Chūbu region ==
=== Block papers of Chūbu region ===
- Chūnichi Shimbun

=== Prefecture papers of Chūbu region ===
- Yamanashi
  - Yamanashi Nichinichi Shimbun
- Nagano
  - The Shinano Mainichi Shimbun
- Niigata
  - Niigata Nippō
- Toyama
  - Kitanippon Shimbun
- Ishikawa
  - Hokkoku Shimbun
- Fukui
  - Fukui Shimbun
- Shizuoka
  - Shizuoka Shimbun
- Gifu
  - Gifu Shimbun

=== Regional papers of Chūbu region ===
- Yamanashi
  - Yamanashi Shimpō (Kōfu)
  - Yatsugatake Journal (Hokuto)
- Nagano
  - Minamishinshū Shimbun (Iida)
  - Nagano Nippō (Suwa)
  - Okaya Shimin Shimbun (Okaya)
  - Ōito Times (Ōmachi)
  - Shimin Times (Matsumoto)
  - Suzaka Shimbun (Suzaka)
- Niigata
  - Echigo Journal (Sanjō)
  - Jōetsu Times (Jōetsu)
  - Kashiwazaki Nippō (Kashiwazaki)
  - Nagaoka Shimbun (Nagaoka)
  - Ojiya Shimbun (Ojiya)
  - Sanjō Shimbun (Sanjō)
  - Shūhō Tōkamachi (Niigata)
  - Tōkamachi Shimbun (Tōkamachi)
  - Tōkamachi Times (Tōkamachi)
  - Tsunan Shimbun (Tsunan)
- Toyama
  - Jōhana Jihō (Nanto)
  - Toyama Shimbun (Toyama)
- Ishikawa
  - Hokuriku Chūnichi Shimbun (Kanazawa)
- Fukui
  - Nikkan Kenmin Fukui (Fukui)
- Shizuoka
  - Fuji News (Fuji)
  - Gakuyō Shimbun (Fujinomiya)
  - Izu Shimbun (Itō)
  - Numazu Asahi Shimbun (Numazu)
  - Numazu Shimbun (Numazu)
- Aichi
  - Chūbu Keizai Shimbun (Nagoya)
  - Higashiaichi Shimbun (Toyohashi)
  - Mikawa Shimpō (Nishio)
  - Nikkan Tōmei (Seto)
  - Tōkai Aichi Shimbun (Okazaki)
  - Tōkai Nichinichi Shimbun (Toyohashi)

=== Defunct newspapers of Chūbu region ===
- Himi Shimbun (Himi, 1936 – 2000)
- Suwa Maiyū Shimbun (Suwa, 1954 – 2004)
- Chūbu Shimpō (Hekinan, 1959 – 2004)
- Kokoku Shimbun (Shimosuwa, 1946 – 2005)
- Hida News (Hida, 1995 – 2005)
- Ina Mainichi Shimbun (Ina, 1955 – 2008)
- Hakuba Shimbun (Hakuba, 1975 – 2008)
- Nagoya Times (Nagoya, 1946 – 2008)
- Kōshoku Shimbun (Chikuma, 1982 – 2011)
- Chūnō Shimbun (Seki, 1947 – 2011)
- Shinshū Nippō (Iida, 1956 - 2013)
- Kyōdo Shimbun (Kakegawa)

== Kinki region ==
=== Prefecture papers of Kinki region ===
- Kyōto
  - Kyoto Shimbun
- Hyōgo
  - Kobe Shimbun

=== Regional papers of Kinki region ===
- Mie
  - Ise Shimbun (Tsu)
  - Kisei Shimbun (Owase)
  - Nanki Shimpō (Kumano)
  - Tōkai Keizai Shimbun (Tsu)
  - Yoshino Kumano Shimbun (Kumano)
  - Yūkan Mie (Matsusaka)
- Shiga
  - Ōmi Dōmei Shimbun (Hikone)
  - Shiga Hōchi Shimbun (HIgashiōmi)
- Kyōto
  - Ayabe Shimin Shimbun (Ayabe)
  - Kameoka Shimin Shimbun (Kameoka)
  - Maizuru Shimin Shimbun (Maizuru)
  - Rakunan Times (Uji)
  - Ryōtan Nichinichi Shimbun (Fukuchiyama)
- Ōsaka
  - Ōsaka Nichinichi Shimbun (Ōsaka)
  - Jimmin Shimbun (Ibaraki)
- Nara
  - Nara Shimbun (Nara)
- Wakayama
  - Hidaka Shimpō (Gobō)
  - Kii Mimpō (Wakayama)
  - Kinan Shimbun (Shingū)
  - Kishū Shimbun (Gobō)
  - Kumano Shimbun (Shingū)
  - Wakayama Shimpō (Wakayama)

=== Defunct newspapers of Kinki region ===
- Shiga Nichinichi Shimbun (Ōtsu, 1922 – 1979)
- Kansai Shimbun (Ōsaka, – 1991)
- Ōsaka Shimbun (Ōsaka, 1946 – 2002)
- Doyōbi (Kyoto, 1936 – 1937)
- Nara Nichinichi Shimbun (Nara, 2006 - 2019)

== Chūgoku region ==
=== Block paper of Chūgoku region ===
- Chugoku Shimbun

=== Prefecture papers of Chūgoku region ===
- Tottori
  - Nihonkai Shimbun
- Shimane
  - Sanin Chūō Shimpō
- Okayama
  - Sanyō Shimbun
- Yamaguchi
  - Yamaguchi Shimbun

=== Regional papers of Chūgoku region ===
- Shimane
  - Shimane Nichinichi Shimbun (Matsue)
- Okayama
  - Bihoku Mimpō (Niimi)
  - Tsuyama Asahi Shimbun (Tsuyama)
- Hiroshima
  - Nishihiroshima Times (Hiroshima)
  - Taiyō Shimbun (Fukuyama)
- Yamaguchi
  - Bōnichi Shimbun (Hōfu)
  - Hōfu Nippō (Hōfu)
  - Nikkan Iwakuni (Iwakuni)
  - Nikkan Shinshūnan (Shūnan)
  - Saikyō Shimbun (Yamaguchi)
  - Ube Nippō (Ube)
  - Yanai Nichinichi Shimbun (Yanai)

=== Defunct newspapers of Chūgoku region ===
- Bōchō Shimbun (Iwakuni, 1964 – 2006)
- Okayama Nichinichi Shimbun (Okayama, 1946 – 2011)

== Shikoku ==
=== Prefecture papers of Shikoku ===
- Kagawa
  - Shikoku Shimbun
- Tokushima
  - Tokushima Shimbun
- Ehime
  - Ehime Shimbun
- Kōchi
  - Kōchi Shimbun

=== Regional papers of Shikoku ===
- Kagawa
  - Shikoku Times (Takamatsu)
- Tokushima
  - Tribune Shikoku (Tokushima)
- Ehime
  - Yawatahama Mimpō (Yawatahama)

=== Defunct newspapers of Shikoku ===
- Nikkan Shin Ehime (Matsuyama, 1960 – 1986)
- Yawatahama Shimbun (Yawatahama, 1928 – 2019)

== Kyūshū, Okinawa ==
=== Block paper of Kyūshū ===
- Nishinippon Shimbun

=== Prefecture papers of Kyūshū and Okinawa ===
- Saga
  - Saga Shimbun
- Nagasaki
  - Nagasaki Shimbun
- Kumamoto
  - Kumamoto Nichinichi Shimbun
- Ōita
  - Ōita Gōdō Shimbun
- Miyazaki
  - Miyazaki Nichinichi Shimbun
- Kagoshima
  - Minaminippon Shimbun
- Okinawa
  - Okinawa Times
  - Ryūkyū Shimpō

=== Regional papers of Kyūshū and Okinawa ===
- Fukuoka
  - Ariake Shimpō (Ōmuta)
  - Fukuoka Kenmin Shimbun (Fukuoka)
  - Itoshima Shimbun (Itoshima)
  - Kokura Times (Kitakyūshū)
- Saga
  - Tosu Shimbun (Tosu)
- Nagasaki
  - Shimabara Shimbun (Shimabara)
  - Tsushima Shimbun (Tsushima)
- Kumamoto
  - Nikkan Hitoyoshi Shimbun (Hitoyoshi)
- Ōita
  - Konnichi Shimbun (Beppu)
- Miyazaki
  - Yūkan Daily (Nobeoka)
- Kagoshima
  - Amami Shimbun (Naze)
  - Minamikyūshū Shimbun (Kanoya)
  - Nankai Nichinichi Shimbun (Naze)
- Okinawa
  - Miyako Mainichi Shimbun (Miyakojima)
  - Miyako Shimpō (Miyakojima)
  - Yaeyama Mainichi Shimbun (Ishigaki)
  - Yaeyama Nippō (Ishigaki)

=== Defunct newspapers of Kyūshū ===
- Fukunichi Shimbun (Fukuoka, 1946 – 1992)
- Kagoshima Shimpō (Kagoshima, 1959 – 2004)
- Karatsu Shimbun (Karatsu, 1946 – 2008)
- Iki Nippō (Iki, 1913 - 2012)
- Iki Nichinichi Shimbun (Iki, 1999 - 2016)
- Kurume Nichinichi Shimbun (Kurume, 1957 – 2017)
- Nikkan Ōmuta (Ōmuta, 1985 – 2018)

== Sports papers ==
- Chukyo Sports
- Chunichi Sports
- Daily Sports
- Doshin Sports
- Kyūshū Sports
- Nikkan Sports
- Nishinippon Sports
- Osaka Sports
- Sankei Sports
- Sports Hochi (formerly the Hochi Shimbun)
- Sports Nippon
- Tokyo Chunichi Sports
- Tokyo Sports

== Party organs ==
- Akahata (Red Flag) (newspaper of the Japanese Communist Party, daily)
- Jiyu Minshu (newspaper of the Liberal Democratic Party (Japan), weekly)
- Komei Shimbun (newspaper of the Komeito, daily)
- Press Minshu (newspaper of the Democratic Party of Japan, sub-weekly)
- Shakai Shimpo (newspaper of the Social Democratic Party (Japan), weekly)

== Business papers ==
- Fuji Sankei Business i.
- The Kabushiki Shimbun
- Nihon Kogyo Simbun
- Nihon Securities Journal
- Nikkan Kogyo Shimbun
- Nikkei Kinyu Simbun (Nikkei Financial Daily)
- Nikkei Ryutsu Simbun (Nikkei Marketing Journal)
- Nikkei Sangyo Shimbun
- Nikkei Veritas

== Industry papers ==
- The Chemical Daily
- The Education Newspaper
- The Hoken Mainichi Shinbun
- Denki Shimbun (Electric Daily News)
- Japan Food Journal
- The Japan Marine Daily
- Japan Rubber Weekly
- The Minato Daily
- National Chamber of Agriculture
- Nikkan Jidosha Shimbun
- Nihon Nogyo Shinbun
- The Suisan Times

== Tabloids ==
- Nikkan Gendai
- Yukan Fuji

== English language papers ==
- The Asahi Shimbun Asia and Japan Watch
- The Japan News (formerly called The Daily Yomiuri)
- The Japan Times
- The Mainichi
- Nikkei Asian Review
- The Wall Street Journal Asia
- Tokyo Brief
- Tokyo Reporter, translates Japanese tabloids
- The Japan Times ST
- Asahi Weekly
- Japan Today

== Chinese language papers ==
- Chubun Doho
- Jiho Shyukan
- Toho Doho

== Braille papers ==
- Tenji Mainichi

== Stance and circulation, only morning (2024) ==
- Yomiuri: conservative (high quality paper) 5,850,000
- Asahi: left (high quality paper) 3,390,000
- Chunichi Shimbun/Tokyo Shimbun: left (high quality paper) 2,100,000
- Nikkan Geadai: left (tabloid) 1,680,000 (Nominal)
- Mainichi: liberal/left (high quality paper) 1,490,000
- Tokyo Sports: (sports) 1,390,000 (Nominal)
- Nihon Keizai: business, conservative (high quality paper) 1,370,000
- Nikkan Sports: 1,350,000
- Houchi Shimbun: (sports) 1,350,000
- Sankei Sports: 1,230,000
- Yukan Fuji: right (tabloid) 1,050,000
- Akahata (Red Flag):Japanese Communist Party bulletin 900,000
- Sankei: right (high quality paper) 840,000
- Chunichi Sports/Tokyo Chunichi Sports: 800,000
- Hokkaido Shimbun: left (high quality paper) 750,000
- Daily Sports: 640,000
- Shizuoka Shimbun: left (high quality paper) 498,000
- Chugoku Shimbun: left (high quality paper) 487,000
