= Japanese newspapers =

Japanese newspapers (新聞 shinbun, or older spelling shimbun), similar to their worldwide counterparts, run the gamut from general news-oriented papers to special-interest newspapers devoted to economics, sports, literature, industry, and trade. Newspapers are circulated either nationally, by region (such as Kantō or Kansai), by each prefecture, or by each city. Some newspapers publish as often as two times a day (morning and evening editions) while others publish weekly, monthly, quarterly, or even yearly. The five leading national daily newspapers in Japan are the Asahi Shimbun, Mainichi Shimbun, the Yomiuri Shimbun, Sankei Shimbun and the Nikkei Shimbun. The first two are generally considered liberal/left-leaning while the latter three are considered conservative/right-leaning. The most popular national daily English-language newspaper in Japan is The Japan Times.

The majority of the newspaper articles are printed vertically. Japanese law prohibits newspaper publishers to be publicly traded.

== Brief history ==
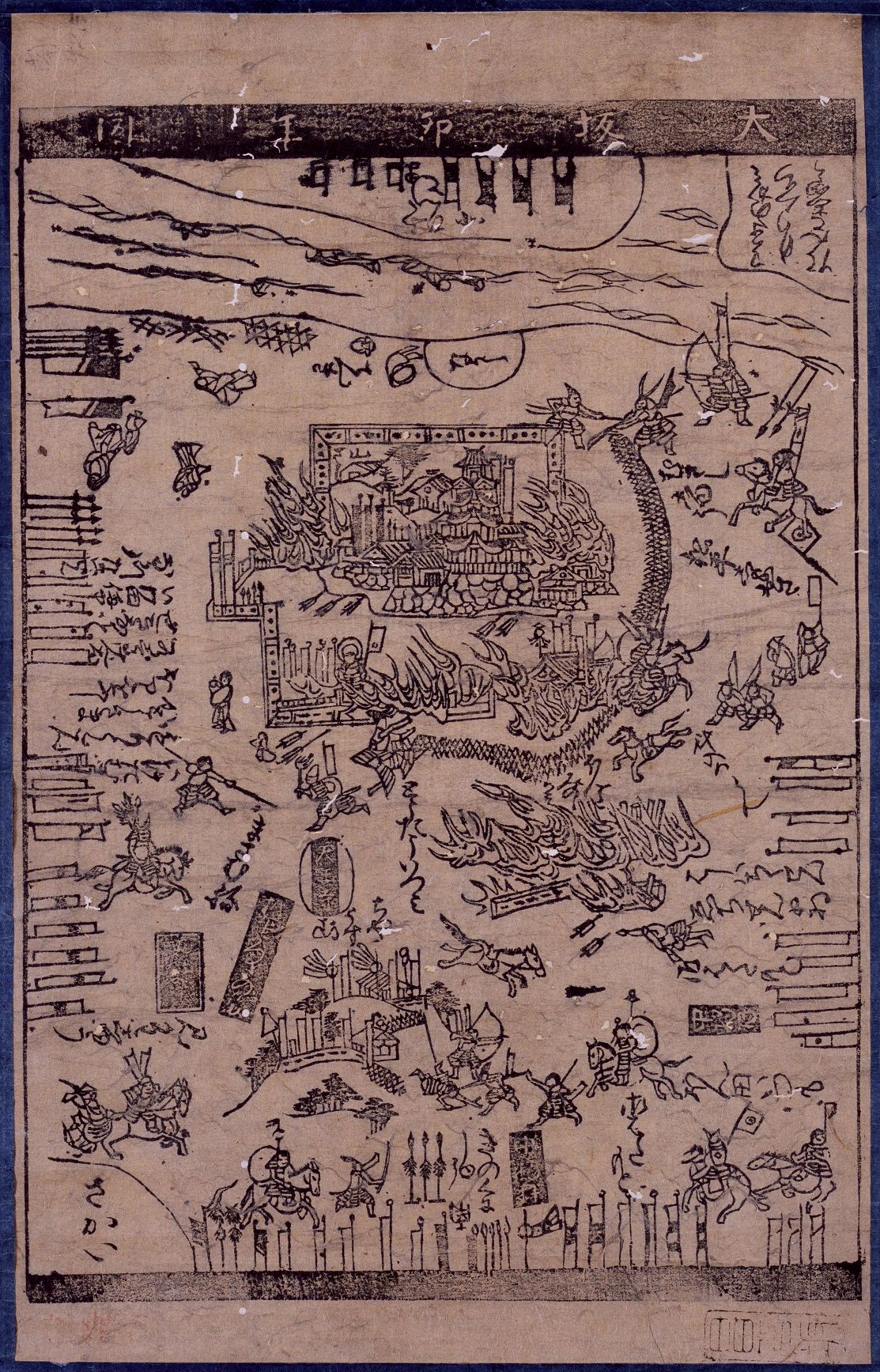
One of the first kawaraban ever printed, depicting the fall of Osaka Castle, 17th century

Japanese newspapers began in the 17th century as yomiuri (読売, literally 'to read and sell') or kawaraban (瓦版, literally 'tile-block printing', referring to the use of clay printing blocks), which were printed handbills sold in major cities to commemorate major social gatherings or events.

The first modern newspaper was the Nagasaki Shipping List and Advertiser, which was published bi-weekly by the Englishman A. W. Hansard. The first edition appeared on 22 June 1861. In November of the same year, Hansard moved the paper to Yokohama and renamed it the Japan Herald. In 1862, the Tokugawa shogunate began publishing the Kampan batabiya shinbun, a translated edition of a widely distributed Dutch government newspaper. These two papers were published for foreigners, and contained only foreign news. The first Japanese daily newspaper that covered foreign and domestic news was the Yokohama Mainichi Shinbun (横浜毎日新聞), first published in 1871.

Newspapers at this time can be divided into two types, Ōshinbun (大新聞, 'large newspapers') and koshinbun (小新聞, 'small newspapers'). People commonly referred to Ōshinbun as "political forums" because these papers were inextricably tied to the Popular Rights Movement (自由民権運動, Jiyū minken undō) and its demands for establishing a Diet. After the government's official announcement of the formation of the Diet, these newspapers, such as the Yokohama Mainichi Shinbun and the Chūgai shinbun, became organs of the political parties. The early readers of these newspapers mostly came from the ranks of the former samurai class.

Koshinbun, on the other hand, were more plebeian, popular newspapers that contained local news, human-interest stories, and light fiction. Examples of koshinbun were the Tokyo nichinichi shinbun (東京日日新聞), the predecessor of the present day Mainichi shinbun, which began in 1872; the Yomiuri shinbun, which began in 1874; and the Asahi shinbun, which began in 1879. In the 1880s, government pressure led to a gradual weeding out of Ōshinbun, and the koshinbun started becoming more similar to the modern, "impartial" newspapers.

Throughout their history, Japanese newspapers have had a central role in issues of free speech and freedom of the press. In the period of "Taishō Democracy" in the 1910s to the 1920s, the government worked to suppress newspapers such as the Asahi shinbun for their critical stance against government bureaucracy that favored protecting citizens' rights and constitutional democracy. In the period of growing militarism to the outbreak of total war in the 1930s to the 1940s, newspapers faced intense government censorship and control. After Japan's defeat, strict censorship of the press continued as the American occupiers used government control in order to inculcate democratic and anti-communist values. In 1951, the American occupiers finally returned freedom of the press to Japan, which is the situation today based on the Article 21 of the Constitution of Japan.

== Reproductions of Japanese newspapers ==
Listed below is an overview of reproductions of the three major Japanese daily newspapers, the Yomiuri shinbun, the Asahi shinbun, and the Mainichi shinbun.

These historical newspapers are available in three major forms, as CD-ROMs, as microfilm, and as shukusatsuban (縮刷版, literally 'reduced-sized print editions'). Shukusatsuban is a technology popularized by Asahi shinbun in the 1930s as a way to compress and archive newspapers by reducing the size of the print to fit multiple pages of a daily newspaper onto one page. Shukusatsuban are geared towards libraries and archives, and are usually organized and released by month.

These resources are available at many major research universities throughout the world (usually universities with established Japanese studies programs). One will need to check each individual library's collection for information about the availability of these sources. WorldCat is a useful starting point.

=== Yomiuri shinbun ===
In 1999, the Yomiuri shinbun released a CD-ROM titled The Yomiuri shinbun in the Meiji Era, which provides a searchable index of news articles and images from the period. Subsequent CD-ROMs, The Taisho Era, The Prewar Showa Era I and The Prewar Showa Era II, were completed eight years after the project was first conceived. Postwar Recovery, the first part of a postwar Showa Era series that includes newspaper stories and images until 1960, is forthcoming. Issues of Yomiuri shinbun printed since 1998 are also available as an online resource through Lexis-Nexis Academic.

=== Asahi shinbun ===
The Asahi shinbun has a CD-ROM database consisting of an index of headlines and sub-headlines from the years 1945–1999. A much more expensive full-text searchable database is available only at the Harvard-Yenching Library at Harvard University, which notably includes advertisements in its index. Researchers using other university libraries would probably have to first use the CD-ROM index, and then look into the microfilm or shukusatsuban versions. Microfilm versions are available from 1888; shukusatsuban versions are available from 1931. Issues of the Asahi shinbun printed since August 1984 are available through Lexis-Nexis Academic.

=== Mainichi shinbun ===
Microfilm versions of the Mainichi shinbun are available for the years 1984–2005, and shukusatsuban are available from 1950 to 1983. Issues of the Mainichi shinbun printed since 27 March 1998, are available through Factiva.

== Stance and circulation, only morning (2026) ==
1. Yomiuri : conservative, 4,890,000
2. Asahi : center-left, 3,030,000
3. Nikkan Gendai : left (tabloid), 1,680,000 (Nominal)
4. Nikkan Sports: 1,660,000 (Nominal)
5. Chunichi Shimbun/Tokyo Shinbun : center-left to left-wing, 1,580,000
6. Tokyo Sports : sports, 1,390,000 (Nominal)
7. Houchi Shinbun : sports, 1,350,000 (Nominal)
8. Sankei Sports: 1,230,000 (Nominal)
9. Nikkei (Jp: Nihon Keizai) : economy, conservative, 1,170,000
10. Mainichi : center to center-left, social liberal, 1,050,000
11. Shimbun Akahata : Japanese Communist Party media, 770,000 (2025)
12. Sankei : right, conservative, 740,000
13. Hokkaido Shimbun : liberal, 700,000
14. Daily Sports: 640,000

== See also ==
- List of newspapers in Japan

== Bibliography ==
- "Japanese-language periodicals". Columbia University.
- "Newspapers". Kodansha Encyclopedia of Japan. Tokyo and New York: Kodansha. 1983.
- "Japan Newspapers and News Media Guide". ABYZ News Links.
- "Japan Newspapers". onlinenewspapers.com.
- "Japan news aggregator". NihongoUp.
