= Youth Division of the Liberal Democratic Party =

The Youth Division of the Liberal Democratic Party is a bureau of the Liberal Democratic Party of Japan. It is an organization mainly composed of young members of parliament.

There are two youth bureaus, one at the party headquarters and one at the local branches, which are made up of members of parliament (members of the House of Representatives and the House of Councillors), but unless otherwise specified, the term usually refers to the former.

== Overview ==
=== Eligibility ===
The division is composed of party members under the age of 45. Any member of the National Diet (House of Representatives and House of Councillors) belonging to the party, including local assembly members (prefectural assembly members, special ward and city/town assembly members), salaried workers, self-employed people, civil servants, and students, can belong to the Youth Bureau as long as they are under 45 years old. By convention, members of the House of Representatives must have been elected three or fewer times, and members of the House of Councillors must have been elected two or fewer times to be eligible to participate.

The party headquarters' Youth Bureau officers are appointed with the approval of the General Affairs Committee from among party members of the Diet, excluding those holding Cabinet positions such as ministers, vice ministers, and parliamentary vice ministers. However, not all party members under the age of 45 automatically become members of the Youth Bureau.

=== Relations with Taiwan ===
One of the important features of the LDP is that it is the only liaison organization for the Republic of China (Taiwan). This dates back to when Chiang Ching-kuo (then head of the China Youth Anti-Communist National Salvation Association, now the China Youth Anti-Communist National Salvation Association, and later President of the Republic of China) visited Japan in 1967, and he and Youth Bureau Directors Toshiki Kaifu and Keizō Obuchi agreed that the LDP Youth Bureau and the China Youth Anti-Communist National Salvation Association would serve as the liaisons between the two countries.

Since then, mutual visits between Japan and Taiwan have been held every year, continuing even after the severance of diplomatic relations with Taiwan in 1972. In October 2011, when Japan was in the opposition, Tarō Asō (the 92nd Prime Minister and 23rd President of the Party) and other former Youth Bureau chiefs visited Taiwan to attend the celebrations for the 100th anniversary of the founding of the Republic of China.

== Organization and management ==
The Youth Bureau at the party headquarters is headed by the Youth Bureau Director, and consists of the deputy director, the Directors of the Youth Division, the International Division, and the Student Division, as well as advisors. It is sometimes described as a "miniature version of the party," and serves as a bridge between the party headquarters and the local regions. In addition to their individual officer titles, all members of the Youth Bureau, except for the Director, are automatically assigned the title of "Deputy Director of the LDP Youth Bureau." Therefore, all members of the Youth Bureau at the party headquarters are technically considered "officers" of the Youth Bureau.

The position of Youth Director at the party headquarters is known as a "stepping stone for young politicians." Six former Youth Directors— Noboru Takeshita, Sōsuke Uno, Toshiki Kaifu, Shinzo Abe, Tarō Asō, and Fumio Kishida— went on to become party presidents and prime ministers, as well as other major politicians such as Shoichi Nakagawa, Fukushiro Nukaga, and Takeo Nishioka. As a spokesperson for the younger generation, the Youth Director is also required to attend executive meetings and the General Council, the LDP's highest decision-making body.

After the Takeshita cabinet resigned, Takeshita came to pay his respects to the LDP Diet Affairs Committee members, and in a casual conversation with Masahiko Komura, the deputy chairman of the Diet Affairs Committee, he said, "The next director of the LDP Youth Bureau after me was Uno-san, and the next was Kaifu." At the time, Komura ignored him, but later realized what he meant.

In the Yasuo Fukuda cabinet, three of the 18 cabinet members (Finance Minister Fukushiro Nukaga, Education Minister Kisaburo Tokai, and Minister of State for Okinawa and Northern Territories Affairs and Minister of Consumer Affairs Fumio Kishida) had experience as director of the Youth Bureau, while in the second Abe Cabinet, five of the 19 cabinet members (Prime Minister Shinzo Abe, Deputy Prime Minister and Finance Minister Tarō Asō, National Public Safety Commission Chairman Keiji Furuya, Foreign Minister Fumio Kishida, and Education Minister Hakubun Shimomura) had experience as director of the Youth Bureau.

Two father-son pairs were appointed as Directors of the Youth Bureau: Koichi Hamada and his son Yasukazu Hamada, and Takeo Hiranuma and his son Shojiro Hiranuma.

=== Director change ===
In June 2015, the Cultural Arts Forum was launched at the initiative of Minoru Kihara, who was the head of the Youth Bureau. However, at the first meeting of the Forum, members made statements in favor of putting pressure on the media, leading to Kihara's dismissal the same month.
