= Chunichi =

Chunichi may refer to:

- Chunichi Dragons, a professional baseball team based in Nagoya, Japan
- Chunichi Shimbun, a progressive-liberal Japanese newspaper
- Chubu-Nippon Broadcasting, a Japanese radio and television network
