= Crime and Punishment (manga) =

Manga by Osamu Tezuka

- The cover for the Japan Times' dual-language publication of Crime & Punishment.

罪と罰 (Tsumi To Batsu)
- Genre: Drama
- Manga
- Written by: Osamu Tezuka
- Published by: Tokodo
- English publisher: US: Digital Manga
- English magazine: Student Times
- Published: November 5, 1953
- Volumes: 1

Crime and Punishment (Japanese: 罪と罰, Hepburn: Tsumi To Batsu) is a manga by Osamu Tezuka, based on Fyodor Dostoevsky's book Crime and Punishment that was published in 1953. In 1990 The Japan Times published a bilingual edition featuring an English translation by Frederik Schodt in Student Times. In Russia it was licensed by Comics Factory and was published in March 2011.

== Plot ==
This is a manga version of the classic Russian novel Crime and Punishment by Fyodor Dostoevsky. Here, Osamu Tezuka draws the characters in his own unique style, and gives some key roles from the book to some of the characters from his Star System. However, the ending of Osamu Tezuka's version of Crime and Punishment is vastly different than Dostoevsky's ending.

Just as in the original novel, the setting is St. Petersburg, Russia during the days when the country was ruled by Czars, but only days before the Russian Revolution. The main character, Rascalnikov, is a child from a poor family who murders an old woman who works as a loan shark. Fleeing with her valuables to support his family, Rascalnikov believes that his murdering of her was justified as she was a bad person.

However, Judge Polifili has been assigned to investigate the woman's murder and soon suspects Rascalnikov. At first, Rascalnikov feels like he can evade the law forever, but as Judge Polifili's investigation continues, Rascalnikov begins to feel cornered. Meanwhile, Sonya, a prostitute, tries to convince Rascalnikov to turn himself in.

== Characters ==
The names of the characters in the manga here are the romanization given at Osamu Tezuka's main website. Next to them are the English translated names found in the English translation of the novel.

- Rascalnikov (Rodion Romanovich Raskolnikov): The protagonist and murderer of the pawnbroker.
- Duke Red as "Judge Polfili" (Porfiry Petrovich): The man assigned to investigate the pawnbroker's murder.
- Buku Bukk as "Rugin" (Pyotr Petrovich Luzhin): A greedy man who wants Donya as his subservient bride. When she refuses, he attempts to frame her for theft.
- Sonya (Sofia Semyonovna Marmeladova): A prostitute from a family of drunkards, she becomes Rascalnikov's love interest.
- Monsieur Ampere as "Sbidorigairov" (Arkady Ivanovich Svidrigailov): A depraved man who is after Rascalnikov's sister, but in a way, is somewhat similar to Rascalnikov.
- Donya (Avdotya Romanovna Raskolnikov): Rascalnikov's sister, called "Donya" or "Dunya" for short.
- Rascalnikov's Grandmother (Pulkheria Alexandrovna Raskolnikov): Rascalnikov's hopeful, albeit clueless, grandmother.

== Tezuka's stage performance ==
When Osamu Tezuka was in college, he appeared on stage in a 1947 production of Crime and Punishment. He was assigned to take on a role as a painter on top of a tall staircase, which terrified him greatly as Tezuka was afraid of heights. Despite his fear, Tezuka bravely went up and performed his role, but was disappointed when he discovered that all the audience could see of him on stage was his feet.

== Reception ==
In September 2007 an exhibition dedicated to Crime and Punishment manga was opened in Dostoyevsky Museum in St. Petersburg. Dostoyevsky's great-grandson said: "Perhaps in the Land of the Rising Sun such things are considered normal and not strange. From the Russian people's point of view, it looks blasphemous. The exhibition of such comics is possible, but Russian people should not study the works of Dostoevsky in Japanese comics. Classics should be read in the original."

== English releases ==
In 1990 The Japan Times released an edition in Japan only. It was the first ever Tezuka work published in English. It is bilingual, with the entire book being in Japanese as well as English. The only other bilingual releases like this are Jippi English Comics' edition of volume one of Jungle Emperor Leo, and Kodansha's 6-volume Princess Knight in 2001.

In 2015 Digital Manga Publishing released an English-only edition.

== See also ==
- List of Osamu Tezuka manga
- Osamu Tezuka's Star System
