= People's News =

People's News can refer to:

- Lidové noviny, a Czech newspaper
- Jimmin Shimbun, a Japanese newspaper

See also:

- People's Daily, a Chinese newspaper
