= The Shikoku Shimbun =

Japanese regional newspaper

- Frontpage of The Shikoku Shimbun on January 1, 2018
- Native name: 四国新聞 or 四國新聞
- Type: Daily newspaper
- Format: Broadsheet
- Owner: The Shikoku Shimbun Company
- Founder: Takeei Nakano; Chishu Oda
- Staff writers: 109 (As of October 2025)
- Founded: April 10, 1889 (as Kagawa Shinpo)
- Political alignment: Center
- Language: Japanese
- Headquarters: 15-1 Nakano-cho, Takamatsu, Kagawa Prefecture, Japan
- City: Takamatsu
- Country: Japan
- Circulation: 200,000 (as of 2025)
- Sister newspapers: Nishinippon Shimbun
- Website: www.shikoku-np.co.jp

The Shikoku Shimbun (Japanese: 四国新聞 or 四國新聞, Hepburn: Shikoku Shinbun) is a Japanese regional daily newspaper based in Takamatsu, Kagawa Prefecture. It is operated by The Shikoku Shimbun Company (四国新聞社). As of 2025, the company published around 200,000 copies daily. It was founded in April 1889 as Kagawa Shinpo (香川新報). It also operates the website Shikoku News (stylized in all caps).

== History ==
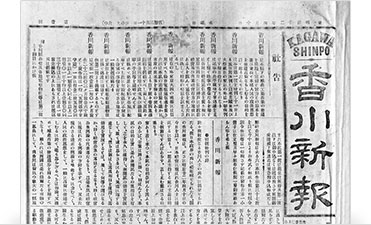
The first issue on April 10, 1889, as Kagawa Shinpo

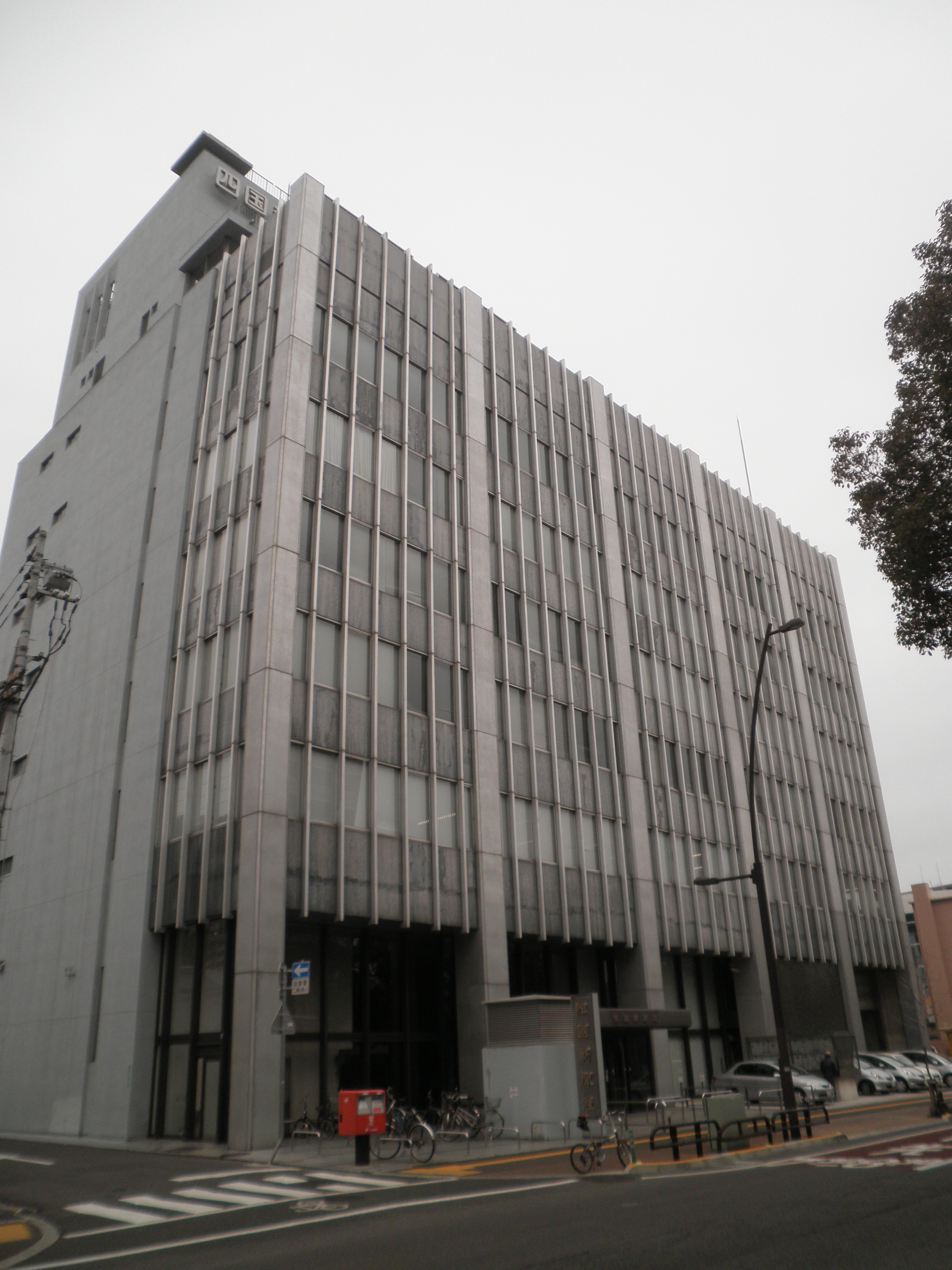
Headquarters in Takamatsu, Kagawa Prefecture

The first edition of the newspaper was published on April 10, 1889, under the name Kagawa Shinpo following the separation of Kagawa Prefecture from Ehime Prefecture. It is the fourth-oldest local newspaper published in Japan. It was founded by Takeei Nakano and his cousin Chishu Oda, the latter of whom served as the publication's first president. The original staff included publisher Tomoshu Oda, editor Seizo Adachi, printer Taira Konishi, and lead writer Doichi Matsunaga. The first issue was 45 cm long and 32 cm wide with four pages. The paper was renamed Shikoku Minpō (四国民報) on May 1, 1918.

On February 11, 1941, under Japan's "one prefecture, one newspaper" ordinance, the Sanuki Business Newspaper (讃岐実業新聞) and Shikoku Minpō merged to form the Kagawa Nichi Nichi Shimbun (香川日日新聞). Several company buildings, including the headquarters and printing offices, were destroyed during the air raid on Takamatsu in July 1945 during World War II. On February 11, 1946, the paper changed its name to Shikoku Shimbun. The Shikoku Shimbun website, Shikoku News, was launched in April 1997.

== Notable reporting and incidents ==
- On February 24, 1947, the publication ran an editorial opposing the 1947 Japanese unified local elections held that same month.
- In 1956, the paper published an editorial regarding Kagawa Governor Masanori Kaneko's trip to the United States for a leadership award, after the Kagawa Prefectural Assembly approved one million yen for the journey.
- Since 2017, the publication has campaigned to "improve children's health", running various interviews and articles regarding video game addiction. The campaign report won the 2019 Newspaper Association Award.
- On February 12, 2016, the morning edition went viral for a front-page headline reading "Kake Udon 235.7 yen" in large font, reporting on rising udon prices in Kagawa prefecture, which is famed for its udon noodles.
- On December 20, 2021, the newspaper ran a morning advertisement with the text "don't just study, play some games" after the Kagawa Prefectural Assembly passed an ordinance restricting children's use of smartphones and games.
- On May 19, 2023, the front-page date was mistakenly printed as "April 19" instead of "May 19".

== See also ==
- Newspapers in Japan
- List of newspapers in Japan

== Further readings ==
- Kashima, Petite (November 23, 2021). "平井卓也推し"を隠さない四国新聞…「身内びいき」せざるを得ない記者の"本音"とは？ [The Shikoku Shimbun does not hide "Takuya Hirai's recommendation" ... What is the "true feeling" of a reporter who has no choice but to "prefide" with his relatives?]. Shukan Bunshun (in Japanese). Archived from the original on April 25, 2026.
- Kashima, Petite (June 22, 2021). 平井デジタル相の親族企業・四国新聞はなぜ共同記事を"足し引き"したのか？ 「ワニ新聞」の持つ思惑やいかに [Why did the Shikoku Shimbun, a relative of the Minister of Digital Hirai, "add and subtrain" joint articles? The intentions of the "Crocodile Newspaper" and how]. Shukan Bunshun (in Japanese).
