= Salon de thé François =

Cafe in Kyoto, Japan

Coordinates: 35°00′12″N 135°46′13″E

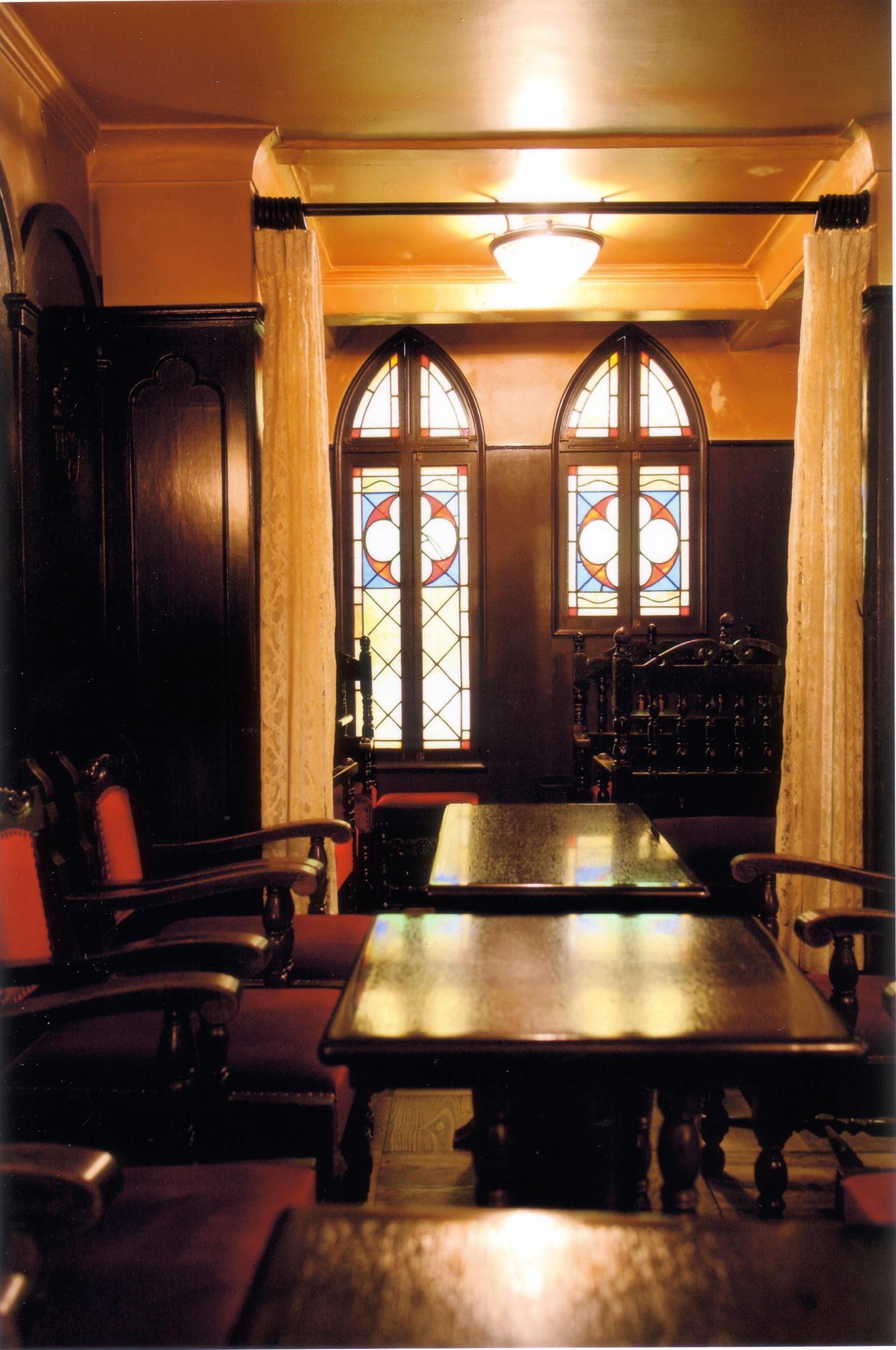
Stained glass windows of Salon de thé François

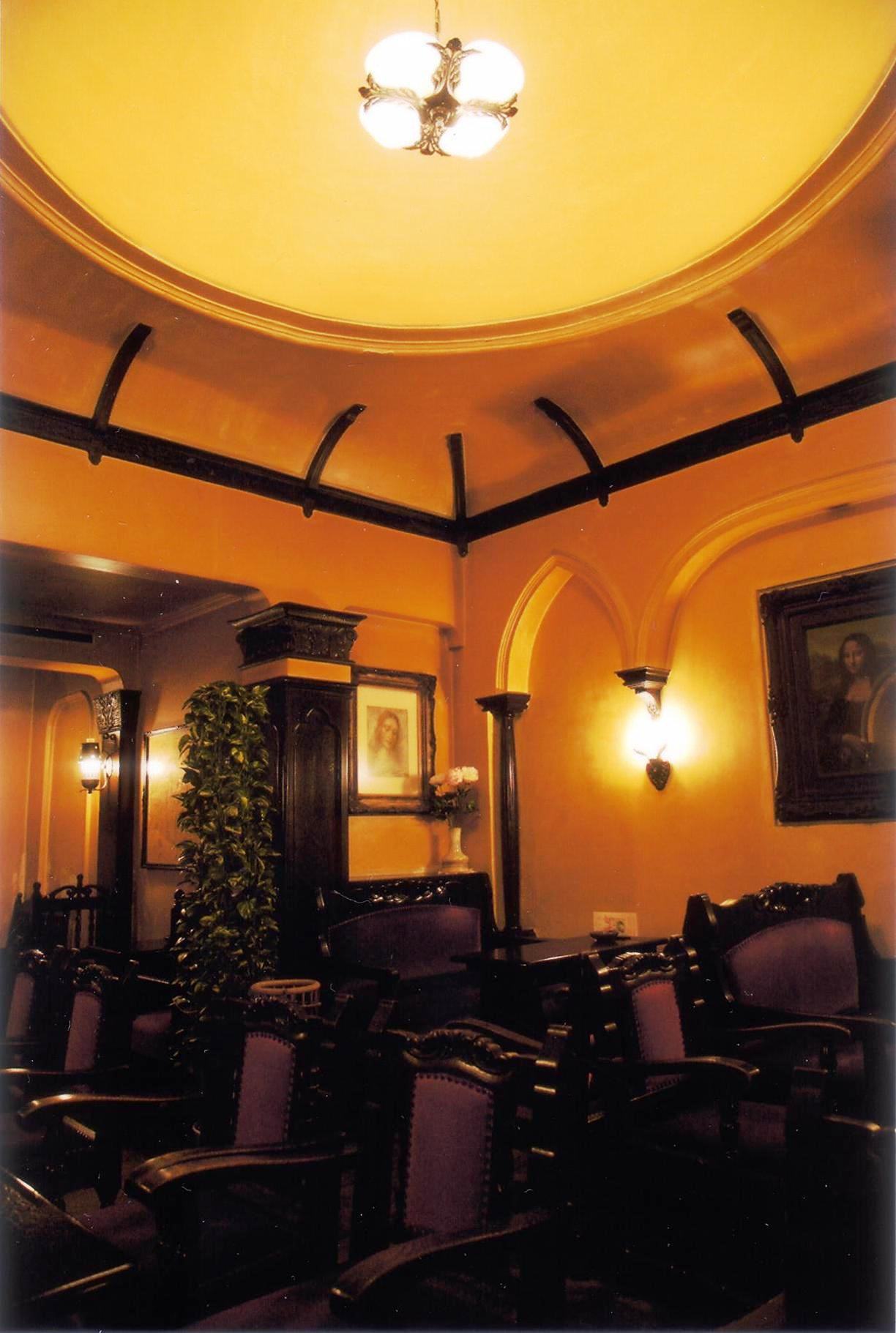
Interior hall of Salon de thé François

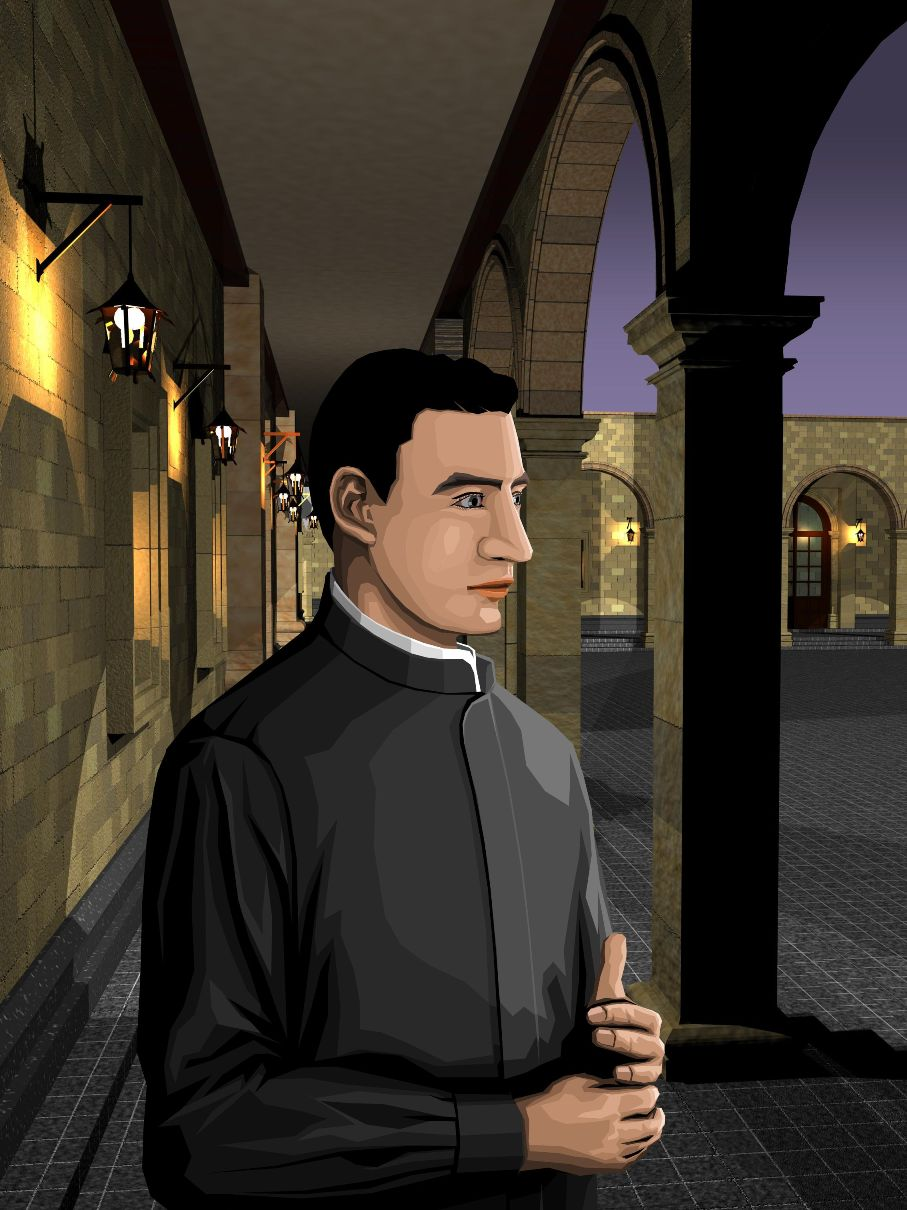
Alexsandro Bencivenni

Salon de thé François is a café in Kyoto, Japan, located at Nishikiyamachi-dōri-Shijō-kudaru; Shimogyō-ku, Kyoto. The building is one of Japan's Registered Tangible Cultural Properties.

== History ==
Salon de thé François was established in 1934 by Shōichi Tateno (September 7, 1908 – June 6, 1995). The building was originally built as a traditional wooden townhouse (Machiya) and was later converted into a western-style café. Tateno had graduated from Kyoto Municipal Art School and became one of the most active leaders of the labor movement in Kyoto in the 1930s. He decided to found a café with the spirit of enlightenment of socialism and art. The café was named “Salon de thé François” in homage to the French painter Jean-François Millet. The profit of the Salon de thé François became a secret source for funding the Japanese Communist Party.

In July 1936, the Salon de thé François started to support distribution of an anti-fascist newspaper, “Doyōbi.” The Doyōbi (“Saturday,” in Japanese) was a six-page tabloid edited by Masakazu Nakai, a lecturer at Kyoto Imperial University, and Raitarō Saitō, an actor at the Shochiku movie studio. The Doyōbi was issued twice a month, distributed mainly in Kyoto and Osaka, and reached a circulation of 8,000.

In July 1937, a week after the outbreak of the Second Sino-Japanese War, Tateno was arrested because of his anti-war activities. In November 1937, Nakai and Saito were also arrested and the Doyōbi was discontinued. During their imprisonment, Rushiko Sato, one of the hall staff members, operated the Salon de thé François.

After his release from Yamashina Prison, Tateno decided to remodel the Salon de thé François. Tateno asked an Italian friend, Alexsandro Bencivenni, to design a new interior. Bencivenni was an academic at Kyoto Imperial University who had escaped from fascist Italy. In these days, Fosco Maraini, an Italian ethnologist, also resided at Kyoto Imperial University for the same reason. While Bencivenni worked on the master plan, Shirō Takagi, another friend of Tateno, designed stained glass windows and painted several murals. The interior hall of 40 square meters was arched with a dome 4.5 meters high, which emulated a public room of an ocean liner sailing between Europe and Asia. The decorative motif represented the Italian Baroque style of the 17th century although several columns were designed to represent the style of the Italian Renaissance.

The Salon de thé François continued business even after the outbreak of the Pacific War in December 1941, although the name was changed to Japanese “Miyako Sabō” (Kyoto Tea Room) because of the prohibition of the use of enemy languages. When Italy signed the armistice with the allies in September 1943, the Japanese authorities demanded Bencivenni declare allegiance to the fascist puppet republic of Salo. Bencivenni refused to do this and consequently was interned with Fosco Maraini and other Italians in a concentration camp at Nagoya for two years.

The Salon de thé François could no longer purchase coffee beans, and thus served green tea and dried banana chips as snacks. Tateno closed the shop in late 1944 because of the shortage of food and increased air raids.

The Salon de thé François returned to business after the end of the war. In 2002, the Japanese Agency for Cultural Affairs certified the building as a Registered Tangible Cultural Property. The three children of Tateno now operate the shop.

== See also ==
- Japanese resistance during the Shōwa period
