= Shizuoka Asahi Television =

JOSI-DTV
- Logo used since 2021

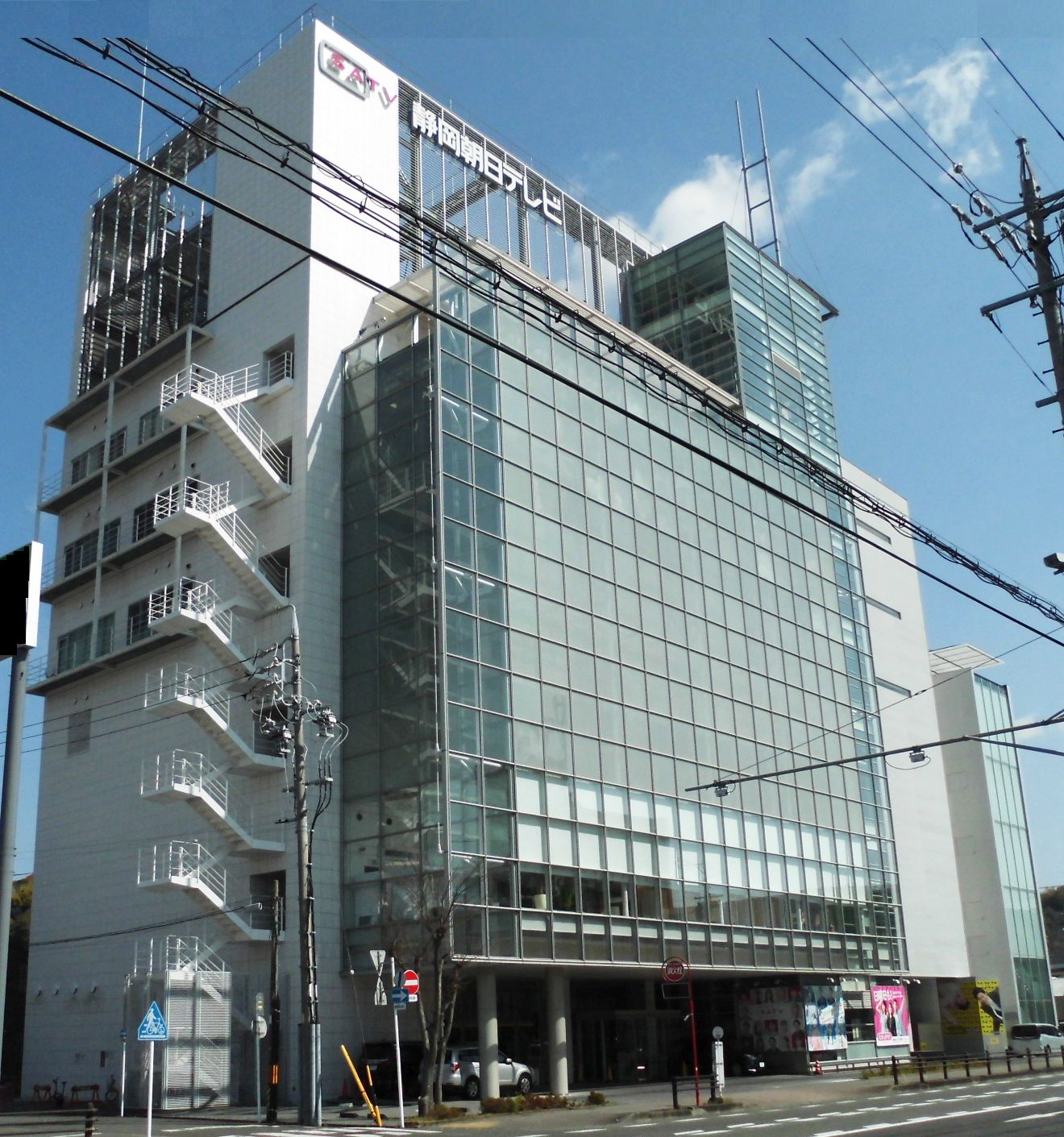
- Headquarters in Aoi-ku, Shizuoka
- Shizuoka Prefecture; Japan
- City: Shizuoka
- Channels: Digital: 18 (UHF); Virtual: 5
- Branding: Shizuoka Asahi Television; Asahi Terebi (あさひテレビ)

Programming
- Affiliations: All-Nippon News Network

Ownership
- Owner: Shizuoka Asahi Television Co., Ltd.

History
- Founded: November 19, 1976
- First air date: July 1, 1978
- Former call signs: JOSI-TV (1978-2011)
- Former names: Shizuoka Kenmin Television (1978-1993)
- Former channel numbers: Analog: 33 (UHF, 1978-2011)
- Former affiliations: NNN/NNS (secondary, 1978-1979)

Technical information
- Licensing authority: MIC

Links
- Website: www.satv.co.jp

Shizuoka Asahi Television (静岡朝日テレビ, Shizuoka Asahi Terebi), also known as SATV, is a television network headquartered in Shizuoka Prefecture, Japan. The station, which began broadcasting on July 1, 1978, is an affiliate of ANN.

SATV is the third commercial television station in Shizuoka prefecture. When it was founded, the company name was Shizuoka Prefectural Television (静岡けんみんテレビ, SKT), and it was affiliated with NNN and ANN, the result of a complicated bidding process which involved two competing press groups. After Shizuoka Daiichi Television founded, Shizuoka Prefectural Television became a sole affiliate of ANN. In 1993, it renamed to Shizuoka Asahi TV.

== History ==
In 1967, the Ministry of Posts and Telecommunications opened the UHF band for use in television, generating a wave of television licenses for a second station outside of the main metropolitan areas of Japan. TV Shizuoka became the first UHF station (second commercial station overall) in the prefecture, opening in November 1968. The establishment of a third private television station led to a scenario in which the Asahi Shimbun-backed group (which was accompanied by Chunichi Shimbun and Nikkei Shimbun) confronted with the Yomiuri Shimbun-backed group (accompanied by Shizuoka Shimbun). There were also requests for the opening of a television station based in the city of Hamamatsu, the second largest in the prefecture, and birthplace of Kenjiro Takayanagi, supported by Asahi and Chunichi.

In 1973, the MPT declared viable a license for a third commercial television station in Shizuoka Prefecture, intensifying the competition between The Asahi Shimbun and Yomiuri Shimbun. No less than 274 companies applied, 150 of which were linked to Asahi Shimbun. Although the Ministry had rejected the original plan from the prefectural government, it was forced to cede because the prefectural government refused to mediate the bidding dispute between the two newspaper groups if conditions weren't met. The Shizuoka Government approved a mediation plan, which meant that the creators of the license would have six representants each from the Asahi and Yomiuri groups, as well as a neutral person, and that a fourth commercial station would also be created at the same time. Both Asahi and Yomiuri agreed and the first shareholders' meeting was to be made in September 1976. On September 14, they issued a bid to the MPT as the "Shizuoka Private Broadcasting Company" (静岡県民放送), obtaining a preliminary license on September 24. This became known as the "Shizuoka Method", and was later applied to later television plans in other prefectures involving two key newspaper groups. On the fourth meeting held on November 4, 1976, it was announced that all parties agreed to formally establish Shizuoka Prefectural Broadcasting before November 20, and after the confirmation of the license for the fourth TV station, the group immediately quit from being part of the roles of director and supervisor, transferring its shares to another group. That same month, Asahi Shimbun acquired a building in Shizuoka to use as its facilities, while Yomiuri Shimbun announced that it would build one of its own, which would take more time. In April 1978, Asahi and Yomiuri came to terms establishing a First Business Unit and a Second Business Unit. The First Unit, under the control of Asahi Shimbun and TV Asahi, was in charge of operations and staff, while the Second Unit, under the control of Yomiuri Shimbun and Nippon Television, was responsible for the opening of the fourth station. NTV and TV Asahi represented, each other, half of the networked programming, and after the announcement of the launch of the fourth station, Yomiuri Shimbun transferred its 45.2% shares to Asahi Shimbun and fired its unit director to focus on the new station. The dispute between both parties ended with Asahi obtaining Shizuoka Prefectural Broadcasting's control, but when the fourth station was already operational, the third station had already joined both Asahi and Yomiuri's television networks. On June 15, 1978, the station started test broadcasts.

At 6:28am on July 1, 1978, Shizuoka Prefectural Broadcasting went on air, not using its corporate name, instead being branded on-air as Shizuoka Prefectural Television (静岡けんみんテレビ, SKT). On launch month, the station had record revenue of 120 billion yen, a record for a newly-launched television station at the time. Due to the complicated bidding process, the station was a charter affiliate of NNN/NNS and ANN during its first year on air, while covering 96% of the prefecture with its transmitter network. According to a Video Research ratings report commissioned for SKT, the station in February 1979 during prime time (7-10pm) was of 14.9%, in second place among the commercial stations, behing SUT and ahead of SBS. During the overall evening period (7-11pm), it ended up in third place, at 14.9%, while its overall full-day total was 7.1%, also in third place. In April, the ratings rose to 16.7% during prime time, 16.6% during evenings and 7.8% all-day, ending up in second place overall.

On July 1, 1979, Shizuoka Daiichi Television signed on, becoming the NNN/NNS affiliate, with NTV and Yomiuri withdrawing their shares because of the new station. This caused SKT to become a full-time ANN affiliate, the ninth overall. In October 1979, a new Video Research study showed that SKT had become the third most-watched station in all three rating metrics, ahead of SDT. That year, it broke its first profit. In 1982, the station assisted TV Asahi in producing Seibu Keisatsu, filming the series in the prefecture. That year, the company issued 8% stock dividends, the first since its launch. A satellite news gathering unit was installed in 1989. In 1990, it started broadcasting in stereo, while in 1991, it started broadcasting programs in enhanced definition (Clearvision).

In 1993, Fumio Okura, president of SKT, issued three plans for a five-year period: changing the company's name, building new headquarters and modernizing the main control room. Three names were considered: Shizuoka Asahi Television (静岡朝日テレビ), Tokai Asahi Television (東海朝日テレビ) and Chubu Asahi Broadcasting (中部朝日放送). The first of these was selected. The name change was made official on October 1, 1993 and the initials were now SATV. In April 1994, it acquired a plot of land at Higashi Ward for its new headquarters. It adopted Takenaka Construction Company's plan in February 1996, becoming the first quake-resistant building for a television station in Japan. It has six floors and a total area of 5,782 square kilometers. The new facilities were completed on March 31, 1998 and broadcasts from there started on July 1, its 20th anniversary. Before relocating, on April 19, 1998, it became the second TV station in the prefecture to establish a labor union.。

On March 23, 2005, SATV began testing its digital terrestrial transmissions, which would formally commence on November 1 of that year. The analog signal shut down on July 24, 2011. Young SATV staff formed the online television station SunSetTV in 2015 to cater to the youth.
