= Chunichi Shimbun =

Japanese daily newspaper

The Chunichi Shimbun

- Front page of Chunichi Shimbun on September 28, 2026
- Type: Daily newspaper
- Format: Blanket (54.6 cm × 40.65 cm)
- Owner(s): Chunichi Shimbun Co., Ltd.
- Publisher: Uichirō Ohshima
- Founded: September 1942 (Chubu-Nippon Shimbun); March 1886 (Shin-Aichi and Nagoya Shimbun)
- Political alignment: Centre-left to left-wing Social democracy Liberalism (Japanese); Progressivism
- Language: Japanese
- Headquarters: Nagoya
- Circulation: Morning edition: 1,614,901; Evening edition: 156,593 (Japan ABC, december 2025)
- Price: Morning edition: 130 Yen/copy; Evening edition: 50 Yen/copy; Subscription: 3,925 Yen/month (Morning and evening edition)
- Website: www.chunichi.co.jp

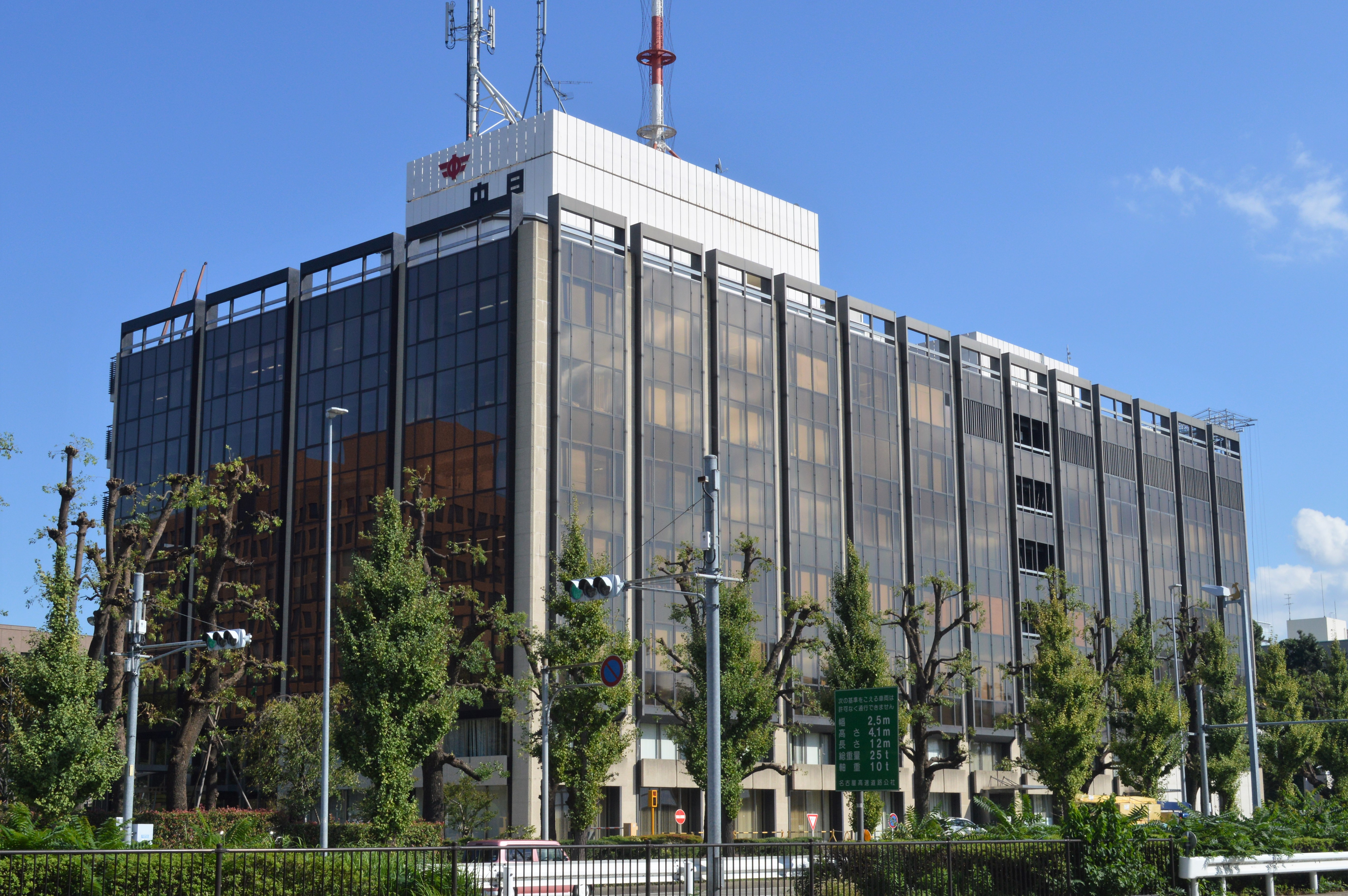
Headquarters of Chunichi Shimbun in Nagoya

The Chunichi Shimbun (中日新聞, Chūnichi Shinbun; Central Japan News) is a Japanese daily "broadsheet" newspaper published in mostly Aichi Prefecture and neighboring regions by Chunichi Shimbun Co., Ltd. Based in Nagoya, one of the three major Japanese metropolitan areas, it boasts the third highest circulation after the group newspapers the Yomiuri Shimbun and The Asahi Shimbun. Even the Chunichi Shimbun alone exceeds the number of copies of the Sankei Shimbun. The newspaper is dominant in its region, with a market penetration approaching 60 percent of the population of Aichi Prefecture. The Chunichi Shimbun group also publishes the Tokyo Shimbun, the Chunichi Sports, and the Tokyo Chunichi Sports newspapers. While each newspaper maintains independent leadership and is considered a "separate" paper, the group's combined circulation in 2024 was 2,274,583, ranking third in Japan behind the Yomiuri Shimbun and the Asahi Shimbun.

The Chunichi Shimbun is Japan's second largest leftist newspaper. It is positioned as a representative newspaper of Nagoya.

It is also the owner of the Chunichi Dragons baseball team.

== History ==
The newspaper replaces the Nagoya Shimbun. In 1942, the Shin Aichi and the Nagoya Shimbun amalgamated to become the Chubu Nippon Shimbun. In 1936, the Nagoya Shimbun financed the Nagoya Golden Dolphins. The paper acquired the team now called the Chunichi Dragons in 1946.

== Foreign correspondence network ==
The group has thirteen foreign bureaus. They are in New York City, Washington, D.C., London, Paris, Berlin, Moscow, Cairo, Beijing, Shanghai, Taipei, Seoul, Manila, and Bangkok.

== Political position ==
The Chunichi Shimbun holds progressive views, and has political tendencies towards liberalism, social democracy and socialism.

It supported the Japan Socialist Party in the Showa period, the Democratic Party of Japan and Social Democratic Party (Japan) in the Heisei period, and the Constitutional Democratic Party of Japan in the Reiwa period.

The two prewar newspapers (Shin-Aichi and Nagoya Shimbun) were conservative in the Chunichi Shimbun, but the founder, Kissen Kobayashi, ran for the mayor of Nagoya in 1951 at the recommendation of the Japan Socialist Party (first rejected, 1952). It was elected in the year) and changed to a left-leaning newspaper supported by the Japan Socialist Party. The Tokyo Shimbun was once a right wing, but when it was acquired by the Chunichi Shimbun in 1964, it changed to a left-leaning newspaper.

Probably because of this, the mass media reforms led by the Ministry of Posts and Telecommunications under the LDP administration in the Showa era (1955 system) were treated coldly, and it was not possible to become a national newspaper and to have its own TV station in Kanto. No (Tokyo 12 channel (currently TV Tokyo) was acquired by the Nikkei, and currently independent stations in the Kanto region such as Tokyo Metropolitan Television and TV Kanagawa are affiliated with the Chunichi Shimbun).

It was the only major newspaper against the Koizumi reforms, and the Asahi Shimbun and others agreed. Chunichi was the only one who opposed the TPP in a major newspaper. It holds a pro-labor union position.

In 2012, the newspaper published an editorial on the Tomorrow Party of Japan. It also has a branch office in Fukushima Prefecture (not officially issued).

As a media company, the Yomiuri Shimbun Group and the Fujisankei Communications Group have a deep relationship with the conservative Liberal Democratic Party, while the Chunichi Group is a liberal newspaper and has a deep relationship with the Constitutional Democratic Party of Japan.

The Asahi Shimbun had a close relationship with the Kōchikai, a moderate faction of the Liberal Democratic Party.

It opposes the revision of the constitution and the prime minister's visit to Yasukuni Shrine.

This newspaper is skeptical of the death penalty.

== Group companies ==
=== Mass media ===
- Chubu-Nippon Broadcasting
- Tokai Radio Broadcasting
  - Tokai Television Broadcasting
  - Ishikawa TV
  - Toyama Television Broadcasting
- Fukui Television Broadcasting
- Mie Television
- Biwako Broadcasting

The following broadcasting stations are jointly funded by other major newspapers.

- Television Aichi – The Nikkei invested
- Hokuriku Asahi Broadcasting – Asahi Shimbun Company invested
- TV Shizuoka – Fujisankei Communications Group invested
- Shizuoka Asahi Television – Asahi Shimbun Company invested
- Nagano Broadcasting Systems – Fujisankei Communications Group invested
- Asahi Broadcasting Nagano – Asahi Shimbun Company invested
- TV Hokkaido – The Nikkei and Hokkaido Shimbun invested

=== Sports ===
- Chunichi Dragons

=== Others ===
- Chunichi Eiga-sha

== See also ==
- List of newspapers in Japan
- Tokyo Shimbun – Chunichi Shimbun's Title in the Tokyo Metropolitan Area
- Japanese Communist Party
- Constitutional Democratic Party of Japan
  - Katsuya Okada – his little brother is an employee.
    - Aeon (company)
  - Hirotaka Akamatsu
  - Shoichi Kondo – Former employees
  - Yuko Mori
- Japan Socialist Party
  - Social Democratic Party of Japan
- Democratic Party of Japan
- Fusae Ichikawa – Former employees
- Seoul Shinmun – Affiliated newspaper in South Korea
- Libération – Affiliated newspaper in France
