= Doyōbi =

Japanese newspaper

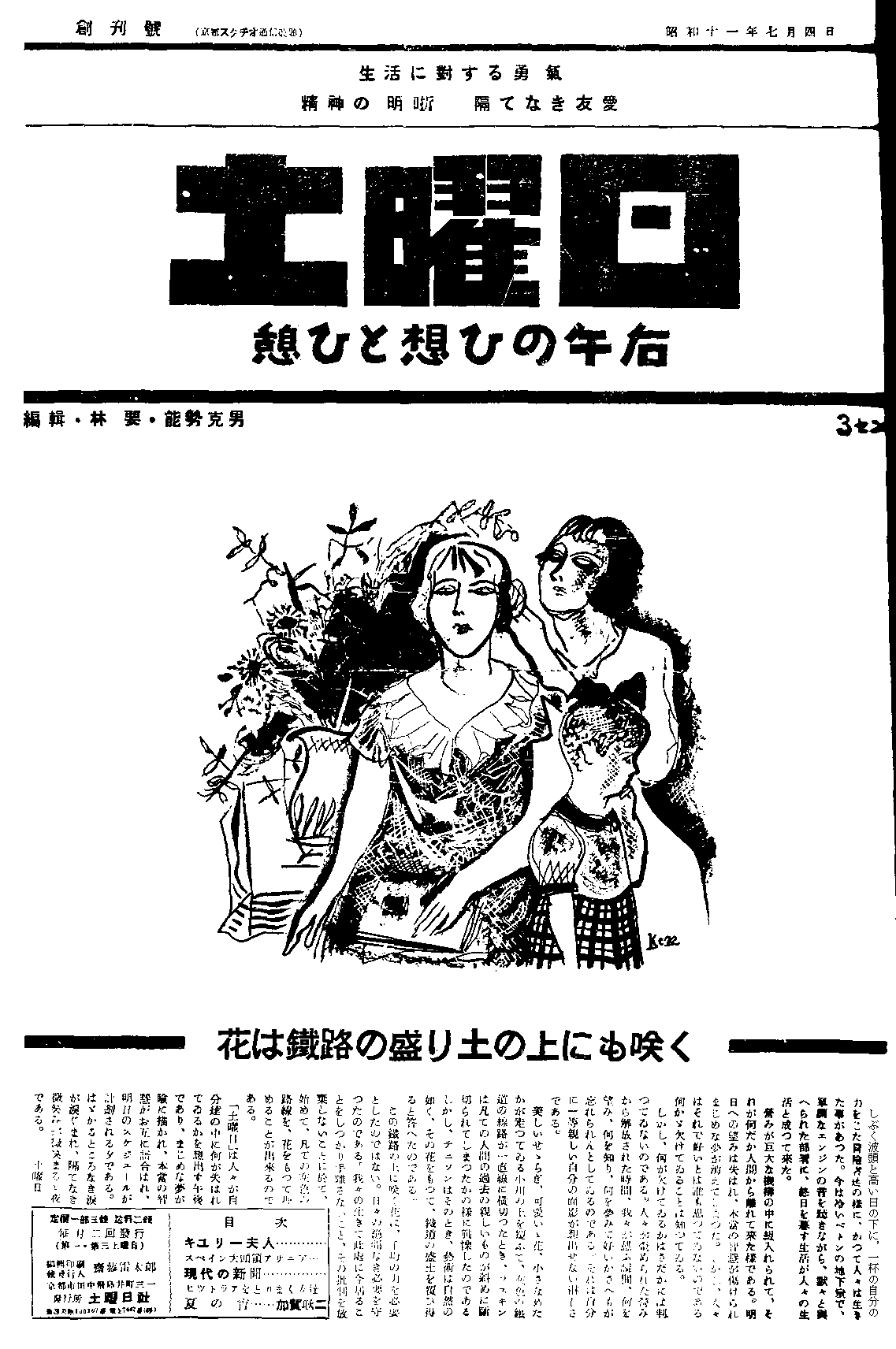
- Type: Bi-weekly
- Format: Tabloid
- Editor: Katsuo Nose; Masakazu Nakai; Kaname Hayashi
- Illustrator: Kenzo Itani
- Founded: July 1936
- Ceased publication: November 1937
- Political alignment: Anti-fascist
- Language: Japanese
- City: Kyoto
- Country: Empire of Japan
- Circulation: 8,000 (as of 1937)
- Sister newspapers: Vendredi

The Doyōbi (Japanese: 土曜日, pronounced [dojoːbi]) was an anti-fascist newspaper published in Kyoto, Japan, from July 1936 to November 1937. The Doyōbi ("Saturday") was named after the Vendredi ("Friday"), an organ of the French Popular Front. Katsuo Nose (1894–1979), Masakazu Nakai (1900–1952) and Kaname Hayashi (1894–1991), who were popular academics in Kyoto, were responsible for the editing, while Raitaro Saito (1903–1997), a film actor, managed the finances and advertisements by sponsors.

The Doyōbi was a six-page tabloid-size newspaper. The cover page consisted of an illustration by Kenzo Itani (1902–1970) and an editorial opinion from Nakai, Nose or another editor.

When a straight gray railroad cut across a beautiful stream with shallows, sweet flowers and small killifishes swimming, Ruskin shuddered with the feeling as if all past things familiar to human beings were cut off diagonally. At that time, however, Tennyson's response was that the arts can cover the railroad bank as nature can cover it with flowers.

These flowers blooming on the railroad have not needed great strength but they have only kept meeting continuous daily needs.

By not abandoning to live here and to be here, by not relinquishing to criticism, by only this way, all gray railroads can be covered with flowers.

— Editorial opinion of the first issue of Doyōbi, July 7, 1936

Apart from the cover page, one page was reserved for movie information, while the remaining four pages were filled by columns about culture, women and entertainment. The content and writing were significantly simple and plain, but maintained an anti-fascist and anti-war stance with cautious wording.

The Doyōbi was distributed by bookstores, with each store stocking 5 to 30 copies. To quickly boost sales, Saito delivered 20 to 30 copies of the Doyōbi to sponsoring cafés for free. The Doyōbi's reputation then spread day by day, and many cafés bought and put the Doyōbi on tables. The Doyōbi's circulation, which was 2,000 at first, increased to 8,000 at the peak. Nose and Nakai held editorial meetings at cafés like the Salon de thé François, which became the center of the Popular Front movement in Kyoto.

The Doyōbi frequently reported on the lives of workers in Kyoto, as well as being full of amusing articles about movies and fashions, and these articles were the principal characteristic of this newspaper.

However, the police strengthened the suppression of the left-wing activists after the outbreak of the Second Sino-Japanese War in July 1937. In November 1937, Nakai and Saito were arrested and the Doyōbi was discontinued. Afterward, the police arrested the rest of the members, including Nose, intermittently. This wholesale arrest was later called the Kyoto Popular Front Incident of 1937.

== See also ==
- Japanese resistance during the Shōwa period

== Bibliography ==
- Doyōbi (Fukkokuban ed.). Tokyo: Sanʼichi Shobō. 1974.
- Itō, Shun'ya (1978). Maboroshi no "Sutajio tsūshin" e. Tokyo: Renga Shobō Shinsha.
