= Jiyu Minshu =

Japanese political newspaper

- Type: Weekly newspaper
- Owner: Liberal Democratic Party
- Founded: 15 November 1955
- Language: Japanese
- Headquarters: Tokyo
- Country: Japan

Jiyu Minshu (Japanese: 自由民主, lit. 'Liberal Democratic') is the official newspaper of the Liberal Democratic Party of Japan, published by the Party's Public Relations Headquarters News Publishing Bureau.

The content typically includes reports, interviews with the party president, executive officers, and cabinet members, as well as special sections introducing the party headquarters and prefectural branches. It rarely publishes current affairs reports. Jiyu Minshu is available in three formats: print, online, and Braille. The print version is published every Tuesday, the online version is updated every Wednesday, and the Braille version is published every other month (mid-odd-numbered months).

== History ==
In November 1955, he newspaper was launched under the name Jiyu Minshu at the same time as the founding of the Liberal Democratic Party. At the same time, the monthly magazine Policy Monthly Report was also launched. In October 1967, the title was changed to Jiyu Shinpo. In 1974, the Policy Monthly was renamed to Monthly Liberal Democratic. In January 1999, the weekly edition was again renamed Jiyu Minshu. On 15 March 2010, the Monthly Liberal Democratic was merged with Jiyu Minshu and ceased publication, with the final issue being the April issue.
