= Shimbun Akahata =

Japanese Communist Party newspaper

- Front page of Shimbun Akahata on November 15, 2026
- Type: Daily newspaper
- Owner: Japanese Communist Party
- Editor-in-chief: Kogiso Yoji
- Founded: 1928
- Language: Japanese
- Headquarters: Tokyo
- Country: Japan
- Circulation: 850,000 (2024)
- Website: Akahata (in Japanese); Japan Press Weekly (in English)

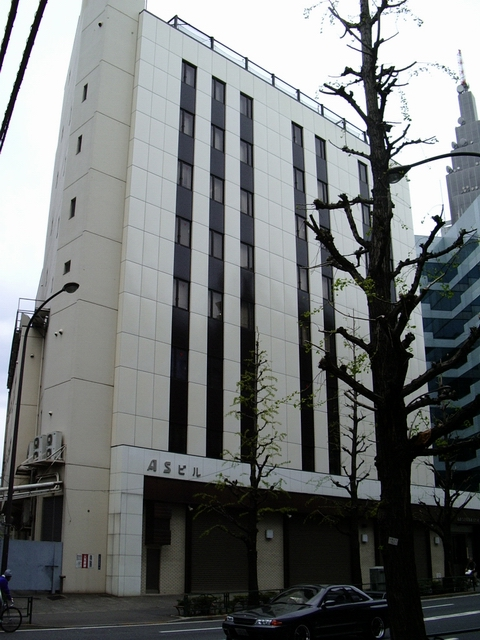
Shimbun Akahata headquarters in Sendagaya, Tokyo

Shimbun Akahata (Japanese: しんぶん赤旗, lit. 'Red Flag Newspaper') is a daily newspaper published by the Japanese Communist Party (JCP). It was founded in 1928 and currently has both daily and weekly editions. Revenue raised from selling the paper is used to fund the party's activities.

== Background ==
The newspaper was founded in 1928, six years after the establishment of the JCP. It was banned in Japan because it was viewed as subversive, forcing it to operate underground. The newspaper was legalized along with the JCP during the American occupation of Japan. Both daily and weekly Sunday editions are printed. A weekly English edition, the Japan Press Weekly, has been published since November 1956. As of 2018, Akahata has six permanent correspondents in Washington, London, Beijing, Hanoi, New Delhi and Cairo, and previously had many more in other cities throughout the world.

Akahata is the centrepiece of a broader publishing enterprise used by the JCP to raise funds for its political activities. 90% of the party's income comes from publications such as Akahata. Akahata reporters are excluded from the kisha club system because the paper is a political party organ. In 2011, a decline in sales caused a financial crisis for the party, causing a monthly deficit of 200 million yen. The JCP held a meeting on 3–4 July 2011 to discuss this problem. It was decided to raise the price of the newspaper and to appeal to all party members to purchase a subscription. As a result, the party returned to profitability for 2011.

== Circulation over time ==
The JCP uses Akahata circulation to evaluate its level of public support.

In 1959, Akahata had a daily circulation of around 40,000. By the end of 1960, as a result of recruitment drives conducted in conjunction with the 1960 Anpo Protests, circulation soared to around 100,000. By 1970, the newspaper had over 400,000 subscribers to its daily edition, and more than 1 million subscribers to its Sunday edition. In the early 1990s, daily subscribers were over 3 million. However, by 2007, daily circulation had fallen to around 1.6 million, and fell further to around 1.0 million by 2019. As of 2024, it has a circulation of 850,000.

== See also ==
- List of newspapers in Japan
- Japanese media
