= Tokyo Reporter =

Japanese English-language news website

The Tokyo Reporter is a Japanese English-language news website whose reporting is based on Japanese news.

== The Tokyo Reporter ==
Founded in 2008 by Brett Bull, a U.S. engineer working in Tokyo, the website translates or adapts reports by Japanese media about such topics as crime, sex and entertainment in Japan. The Washington Post described it as a "hybrid of the National Enquirer, the New York Post and Penthouse". The Post wrote that, because Japanese tabloids are less reliant on authorities for their content than Japanese mainstream media, and less concerned about the international reputation of the nation, Tokyo Reporter projects a less sanitized image of Japan to the outside world than the English language versions of mainstream media.

On January 26, 2022, the closure of TokyoReporter was formally announced. Since March 20, 2023, news articles were being released again on the website, although at a lower frequency than before the closure period.

== Brett Bull ==
Brett Bull, a civil engineer for a Japanese construction company in Ōtsuka, an author and a freelance journalist, writes for Variety, Metropolis Japan Magazine, The New York Times, Japan Today The Japan Times, Loafer's Magazine, and others. From 17 November 1999 to 29 December 2007, he wrote as Captain Japan for his Sake-Drenched Postcards.

=== Works ===
- Bull, Brett; Kuroi, Hiromitsu (2008). More Secrets of the Ninja: Their Training, Tools and Techniques. Tokyo: DH Publishing Inc. ISBN 978-1-932897-51-7. "Tokyo publisher of Japanese pop culture books for the English speaking world."
- Bull, Brett; Kuriyama, Naohisa (2008). Small house Tokyo : how the Japanese live well in small spaces. Tokyo, Japan: Cocoro Books. ISBN 9781932897456. "Cocoro Books is an imprint of Tokyo-based DH Publishing"
- Bull, Brett; Janette, Misha; Clancy, Judith; Farris, Jay; Goss, Rob; Kitano, Noriko; Morel, Robert; Parker, Emma; Sasagawa, Annamarie; Wilson, Chris (2016). Fodor's Japan (22nd ed.). New York: Fodor's Travel. ISBN 978-1-101-87971-9.
- Bull, Brett (2011). Fodor's Tokyo (4th ed.). New York: Fodor's Travel. ISBN 978-0-307-48050-7.
