= Masakazu Nakai =

Japanese aesthetician (1900–1952)

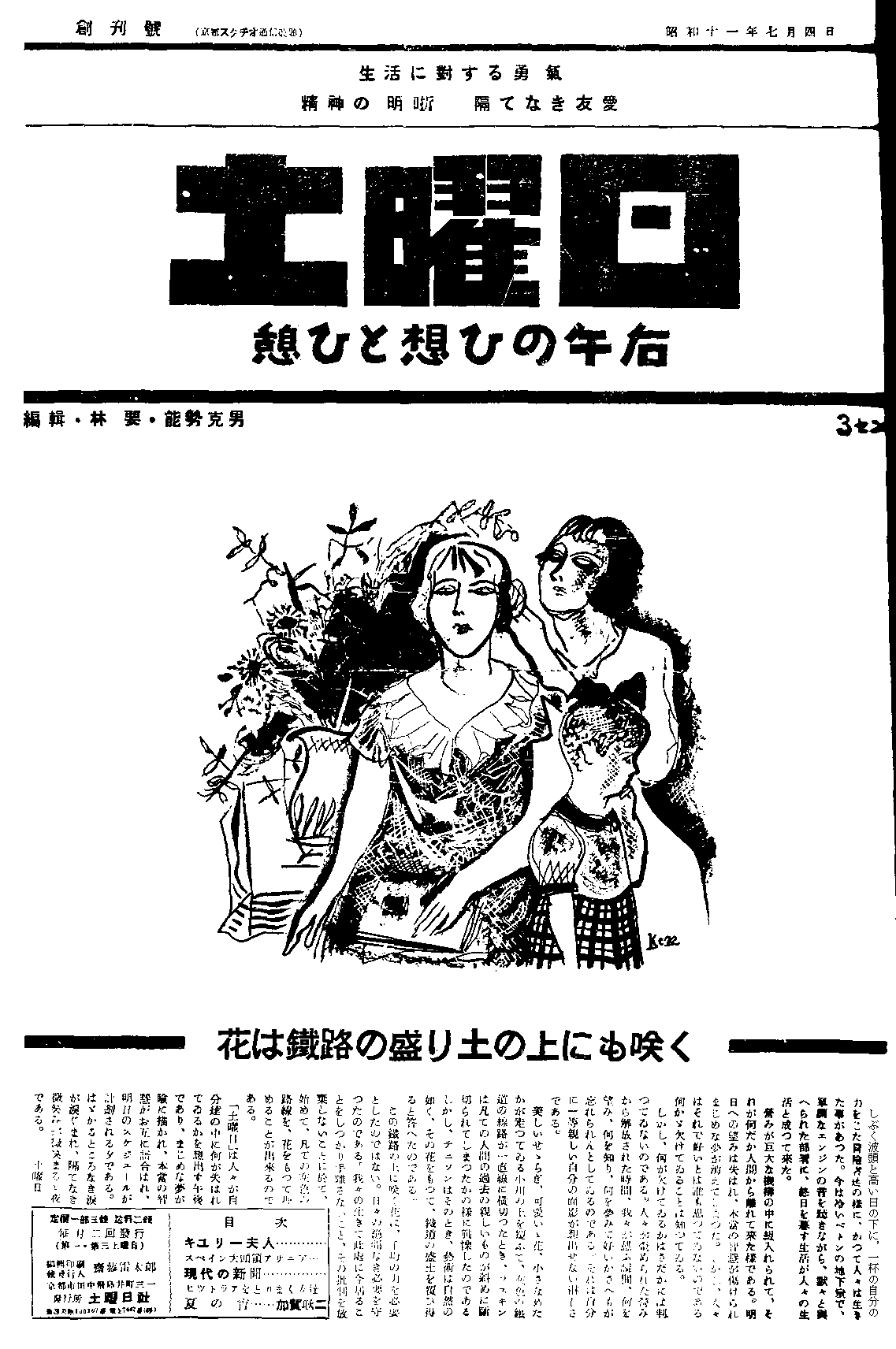
The tabloid Doyōbi, founded by Masakazu Nakai

Masakazu Nakai (中井 正一, Nakai Masakazu, alternative romanization Nakai Shōichi) (14 February 1900 – 18 May 1952) was a Japanese aesthetician, film theorist, librarian, and social activist.

== Career ==
Born in Hiroshima Prefecture, Nakai studied philosophy at Kyoto University, particularly aesthetics under Yasukazu Fukuda. He started the dōjinshi Bi hihyō in 1930, which changed its name to Sekai bunka in 1935. He became a lecturer at Kyoto University while being active in left-wing social movements, protesting Japan's tilt towards fascism and promoting popular forms of culture through such concepts at the "logic of the committee."

Nakai co-founded the popular culture tabloid Doyōbi (Saturday) in 1936. However, the magazine was discontinued in 1937 with his arrest for anti-fascist political activity under the Peace Preservation Law. Nakai also lost his university position as a result of the arrest. After World War II, he continued his political activism by teaching philosophy as part of the Hiroshima Culture Movement and by running for governor of Hiroshima Prefecture, only losing by a narrow margin. He was appointed the first Vice Librarian (fukukanchō) of the National Diet Library in 1948.

== Selected bibliography ==
- Nakai, Masakazu (1981). Nakai Masakazu zenshū (in Japanese). Bijutsu Shuppansha.
- Nakai, Masakazu (December 2010). "Film Theory and the Crisis of Contemporary Aesthetics". Review of Japanese Culture and Society. 22: 80–87.
- Nakai Masakazu (2016). “La logique des comités.” Translated by Michael Lucken. European Journal of Japanese Philosophy 1: 289–357.
- Kaffen, Philip (2018). “Nakai Masakazu and the Cinematic Imperative.” Positions 26, no. 3: 483–515.
- Lucken, Michael (2016). Nakai Masakazu: naissance de la théorie critique au japon. Dijon: Les Presses du réel.
- Lucken, Michael (2018). “On the Origins of New Left and Counterculture Movements in Japan: Nakai Masakazu and Contemporary Thought.” Positions 26, no. 4: 593–618.
- Moore, Aaron (2009). “Para-existential Forces of Intervention: Nakai Masakazu’s Theory of Technology and Critique of Capitalism.” Positions 17, no. 1: 127–157.
