= General Council of the Liberal Democratic Party =

- 自由民主党総務会
- Formation: 1955
- Chairperson: Hiroshi Kajiyama

The General Council of the Liberal Democratic Party is a decision-making body of the Liberal Democratic Party, the ruling party of Japan. It ranks third after the Party Convention and the general assembly of both houses of the National Diet, and is the party's highest permanent decision-making body. It has a capacity of 25 members and is chaired by the General Affairs Chairman.

== Overview ==
The LDP 's General Council is made up of 25 members and is responsible for deliberating and deciding on important matters related to the party's management and parliamentary activities. However, there are cases where the General Council delegates decisions to the party's executive committee. It also has the authority to approve appointments within the party, including the secretary-general, but in most cases it delegates these decisions to the party president in advance or ratifies them. The number of seats was 30 for a long time from 1960 onwards, but was increased to an odd number of 31 in 2001. When the Liberal Democratic Party was defeated in the 45th general election for the House of Representatives in 2009, it was forced to step down from power and the number of seats was drastically reduced, and the number was reduced to 25. When the Liberal Democratic Party returned to power with a landslide victory in the 46th general election for the House of Representatives in 2012, the number of seats increased significantly, but the number of seats has remained the same.

During the ruling party's time, it was a rule that bills submitted by the Cabinet to the Diet were approved by the General Council before being approved by the Cabinet. This was initiated by a request made by General Council Chairman Munenori Akagi to Chief Cabinet Secretary Masayoshi Ohira of the Ikeda Cabinet on February 23, 1962. Bills passed by the General Council were customarily subject to party discipline unless the request contained a clause stating that they were not subject to party discipline. While the party rules explicitly state that the General Council must be decided by majority vote, to avoid any internal rifts, it has become customary to require unanimous consent with the prior consent of observers, such as the president and secretary-general, in order to ensure unanimity. However, since Junichiro Koizumi became president, it has not been uncommon for government bills to be submitted without prior review by the General Council or to be voted on by majority vote. To lift party discipline through a General Council resolution, the party rules require a vote at the party convention or a joint meeting of both houses of parliament, but this has never happened before.

An important aspect of party management is that the general affairs directors tend to be elected equally from each group within the party, so they can be considered representatives of each group. It is also customary for resolutions to be passed unanimously. If a general affairs director opposes an agenda item, he or she will state their opposition and then leave the room, formally making the decision unanimous. This has the following effects: First, budget proposals and bills cannot be submitted without the approval of each group within the party through the general affairs directors. Second, because groups can express their opposition through the general affairs directors, it prevents decisive rifts between groups. Furthermore, if the president loses the confidence of the party, he or she will no longer be able to exercise influence through the General Council, such as by binding party discipline, which has the effect of encouraging early resignation without the need for a joint meeting of both houses of parliament.

== Composition ==
Article 39 of the Liberal Democratic Party Rules stipulates that the General Affairs Officer shall be appointed in accordance with the following provisions 1 to 3.

- 1. 11 members of the House of Representatives who are members of the party and who have been elected by popular vote
  - Note: One member is elected by each of the 11 proportional representation blocks by the House of Councillors and House of Councillors block parliamentary committees.
- 2. Eight members of the House of Councillors who are members of the party and elected by popular vote
  - Note: In practice, they are selected by the House of Councillors executive.
- 3. Six members appointed by the President
  - Note: The Chairman of the General Council is included in this category. The remaining five members are essentially elected by consensus among the President, Secretary-General, and Chairman of the General Council.
