= The Japan Times ST =

Weekly publication in Japan

The Japan Times ST is a weekly newspaper published by The Japan Times for learners of English language. It was first published in 1951, and was originally called Student Times (ジャパン・タイムズ). In 1990, its name was changed to Shukan ST (週刊ST) since a significant portion of its readers were not students. Its name was changed to The Japan Times ST in April 2013, and to The Japan Times Alpha in July 2018.

It has articles on news, movies, lifestyle, opinions, and other topics, in English-speaking countries, attracting learners of English and helping them with notes on terms. Asahi Weekly, by Asahi Shimbun, is its chief competition, although they are distributed by the same network.

The Student Times had a circulation of 190,000 in 1987. Its circulation was later reported as 200,000.
