= Jimmin Shimbun =

The Jimmin Shimbun (人民新聞), also known as People's News (ピープルズニュース), is a Japanese left wing newspaper. It is associated with the new left, but independent from political parties and other organizations.

There have been several other newspapers in history called Jimmin Shimbun.
