= Liberal Democratic Party (Japan) =

Political party in Japan

Liberal Democratic Party 自由民主党 Jiyū-Minshutō
- Abbreviation: LDP; Jimintō
- President: Sanae Takaichi
- Vice President: Tarō Asō
- Secretary-General: Shun'ichi Suzuki
- Founders: Ichirō Hatoyama; Taketora Ogata; Nobusuke Kishi
- Founded: 15 November 1955; 71 years ago
- Merger of: Liberal Party; Japan Democratic Party
- Headquarters: 11–23, Nagatachō 1-chome, Chiyoda, Tokyo 100-8910, Japan
- Newspaper: Jiyu Minshu
- Student wing: LDP Students Division
- Youth wing: LDP Youth Division
- Membership (2025): ▼915,574
- Ideology: Conservatism (Japanese); Right-wing populism; Japanese neoconservatism; Economic liberalism; Statism; Japanese nationalism; Factions: Liberal conservatism; Ultranationalism
- Political position: Centre-right to right-wing Factions: Centre to far-right
- National affiliation: LDP–Komeito coalition (1999–2025); LDP–JIP coalition (2025–)
- International affiliation: International Democrat Union (formerly)
- Colours: Red; Green (Note: Used on the English website.)
- Slogan: 日本列島を、強く豊かに! Nippon rettō o, tsuyoku yutaka ni! ('Make the Japanese archipelago strong and prosperous!')
- Anthem: "われら"; Ware-ra ('We')
- Senators: 101 / 248
- Representatives: 316 / 465
- Prefectures: 1,284 / 2,614
- Municipalities: 2,098 / 28,940

Election symbol

Party flag

Website
- Japanese; www.jimin.jp; English; www.jimin.jp/english/
- Politics of Japan; Political parties; Elections; A: The Liberal Democratic Party is a big-tent conservative party (with various factions), and has been described as centre-right to far-right. The LDP also contains ultraconservative factions, including members belonging to the Nippon Kaigi, an ultranationalist group.

The Liberal Democratic Party (自由民主党, Jiyū-Minshutō; abbr. LDP), also known as Jimintō (自民党), is a major conservative and nationalist political party in Japan. Since its foundation in 1955, the LDP has been in power almost continuously—a period known as the 1955 System—except from 1993 to 1994, and again from 2009 to 2012. Sanae Takaichi has served as president of the LDP since 4 October 2025. She heads a coalition government with the Japan Innovation Party (JIP) since 21 October 2025.

The LDP was formed in 1955 as a merger of two conservative parties, the Liberal Party and the Japan Democratic Party as a united front against the Japan Socialist Party, and was initially led by prime minister Ichirō Hatoyama. The LDP supported Japan's alliance with the United States and fostered close links between Japanese business and government, playing a major role in the Japanese economic miracle from the 1960s to early 1970s and subsequent stability under prime ministers including Hayato Ikeda, Eisaku Satō, Kakuei Tanaka, Takeo Fukuda, and Yasuhiro Nakasone. Scandals and the burst of the Japanese asset price bubble led to the LDP losing power in 1993 and 1994, and governing under a non-LDP prime minister from 1994 before regaining power in 1996. In 1999, the party led the LDP–Komeito coalition, which lasted for the next 26 years.

The LDP regained stability during the premiership of Junichiro Koizumi in the 2000s, gaining significant amount of seats in 2005, before achieving its worst-ever electoral result in 2009, where the Democratic Party of Japan gained a majority. In 2012, the party under Shinzo Abe regained control of the government with a landslide victory, although it lost seats in subsequent elections. Since 2017, the Constitutional Democratic Party (CDP) has been its primary opponent in national politics. After the 2024 and 2025 elections, the LDP lost its majority in both houses of the National Diet, and its coalition with Komeito broke down, leading it to form the LDP–JIP coalition. Led by Takaichi, the party regained a majority in the House of Representatives, winning the biggest number of seats in Japanese electoral history in 2026, holding 316 seats in the House of Representatives and 101 seats in the Senate.

The LDP is often described as a big tent conservative party, including factions that range from moderate conservatism to far-right, ultraconservative and ultranationalist. Although lacking a cohesive political ideology, the party's platform has historically supported increased defense spending, revising Article 9 of the Constitution to codify the status of the Japan Self-Defense Forces, maintaining close ties with the United States and since the 21st century also pursuing close relations with its Indo-Pacific allies to counter the rise of China as a superpower. The party's history and internal composition has been characterized by intense factionalism among its members since its emergence in 1955.

== History ==
=== Beginnings ===
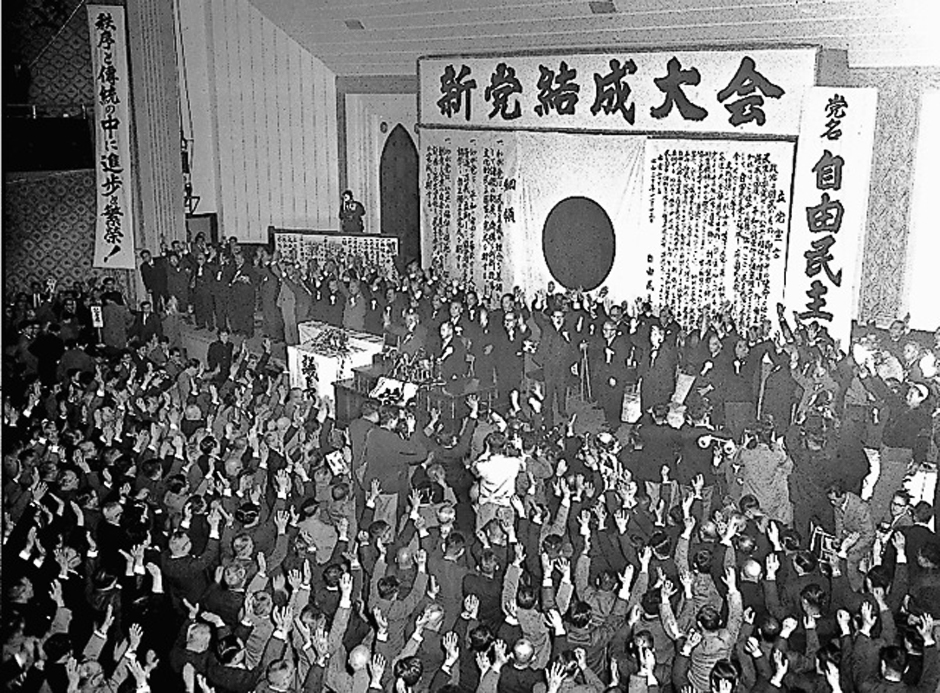
Launching convention, 15 November 1955

The LDP was formed in 1955, a result of a merger between two of Japan's political parties, the Liberal Party (led by Taketora Ogata) and the Japan Democratic Party (led by Ichirō Hatoyama), both conservative parties, as a united front against the then popular Japan Socialist Party, now the Social Democratic Party. Nobusuke Kishi played an instrumental role in the formation of the party. The party won the following elections, and Japan's first conservative government with a majority was formed by 1955. It would hold majority government until 1993.

The LDP began with reforming Japan's international relations, ranging from entry into the United Nations to establishing diplomatic ties with the Soviet Union. Its leaders in the 1950s also made the LDP the main government party, and in all the elections of the 1950s, the LDP won the majority vote, with the only other opposition coming from left-wing politics, made up of the Japan Socialist Party and the Japanese Communist Party. From the 1950s to the early 1970s, the United States Central Intelligence Agency spent millions of dollars to aid the LDP against leftist parties such as the Socialists and the Communists, although this was not revealed until the mid-1990s when it was exposed by The New York Times. Details remain classified, while available documents show connections to prime ministers Nobusuke Kishi and Eisaku Satō.

=== 1960s to 1990s ===
For the majority of the 1960s, the LDP and Japan were led by Eisaku Satō, beginning with the hosting of the 1964 Summer Olympics in Tokyo, and ending in 1972 with Japanese neutrality in the Vietnam War and with the beginning of the Japanese asset price bubble. By the end of the 1970s, the LDP went into its decline, where even though it held the reins of government many scandals plagued the party, while the opposition (now joined with Kōmeitō) gained momentum. In 1976, in the wake of the Lockheed bribery scandals, a handful of younger LDP National Diet members broke away and established their own party, the New Liberal Club (Shin Jiyu Kurabu). A decade later, it was reabsorbed by the LDP.

By the late 1970s, the Japan Socialist Party, the Japanese Communist Party, and Komeito along with the international community used major pressure to have Japan switch diplomatic ties from Taiwan (Republic of China) to the People's Republic of China. In 1983, the LDP was a founding member of the International Democracy Union. In the same year, the party lost a significant amount of seats in the 1983 general election. It won the 1986 general election by a landslide, gaining 300 seats. However, the LDP started to suffer setbacks in elections by the end of the 1980s, mainly due to unpopular policies on trade liberalisation and tax, as well as a scandal involving their leader Sōsuke Uno and the Recruit scandal. In the 1989 House of Councillors election, the party lost its majority in the House of Councillors for the first time in 34 years.

=== Out of power ===
The LDP managed to hold on to power in 1990 general election despite some losses. In June 1993, 10 members of the party's liberal-conservative faction split to form the parties. The end of the postwar miracle economy, the Japanese asset price bubble and other reasons such as the recruit scandal led to the LDP losing its majority in 1993 Japanese general election held on 18 July. Seven opposition parties, including several formed by LDP dissidents, formed the Hosokawa Cabinet headed by Japan New Party leader and LDP dissident Morihiro Hosokawa, who became the prime minister preceded by Kiichi Miyazawa; however, the LDP was still far and away the largest party in the House of Representatives, with well over 200 seats; no other individual party crossed the 80-seat mark. Yōhei Kōno became the president of the LDP preceded by Kiichi Miyazawa, he was the first non-prime minister LDP leader as the leader of the opposition.

In 1994, the Japan Socialist Party and the parties left the ruling coalition, joining the LDP in the opposition. The remaining members of the coalition tried to stay in power as the minority Hata cabinet under the leadership of Tsutomu Hata, but this failed when the LDP and the Socialists, bitter rivals for 40 years, formed a majority coalition. The Murayama cabinet was dominated by the LDP, but it allowed Socialist Tomiichi Murayama to occupy the Prime Minister's chair until 1996 when the LDP's Ryutaro Hashimoto took over.

=== 1996–2009 ===
In the 1996 general election, the LDP made some gains but was still 12 seats short of a majority. However, no other party could possibly form a government, and Hashimoto formed a solidly LDP minority government. Through a series of floor-crossings, the LDP regained its majority within a year. In October 1999, it formed a coalition with Komeito. It lost several seats in the 2000 general election, leading it to rely on its coalition with Komeito to retain a majority. The election also saw the Democratic Party of Japan solidify itself as the main opposition party. In the 2001 leadership election, Junichiro Koizumi was elected on a reformist platform, promising to take on the old factional politics of the LDP. The LDP concurrently won seats in the 2001 House of Councillors election, boosting Koizumi. The LDP did not secure a majority, however, in the 2003 general election, which saw the DPJ make further gains. After bills to privatize Japan Post were voted down, Koizumi called for an early general election in 2005, where the LDP won a landslide victory of 296 seats. Koizumi also declined to endorse 37 members of his party who voted against the postal bills, forcing many of them to run as independents. Koizumi retired a year later, being succeeded by Shinzo Abe in the 2006 LDP presidential election. The LDP remained the largest party in both houses of the National Diet until the 2007 House of Councillors election held on 29 July, when the LDP lost its majority in the upper house.

In the 2007 LDP leadership election, held on 23 September, the LDP elected Yasuo Fukuda as its president, succeeding Abe who had resigned. Fukuda defeated Tarō Asō for the post, receiving 330 votes against 197 votes for Aso. Fukuda resigned suddenly in September 2008, and Asō became Prime Minister after winning the 2008 LDP presidential election against four other candidates. In the 2009 general election, the LDP was roundly defeated, winning only 118 seats—easily the worst defeat of a sitting government in modern Japanese history, and also the first real transfer of political power in the post-war era. Accepting responsibility for this severe defeat, Aso announced his resignation as LDP president on election night. Sadakazu Tanigaki won the 2009 LDP leadership election on 28 September.

=== 2009–2024 ===
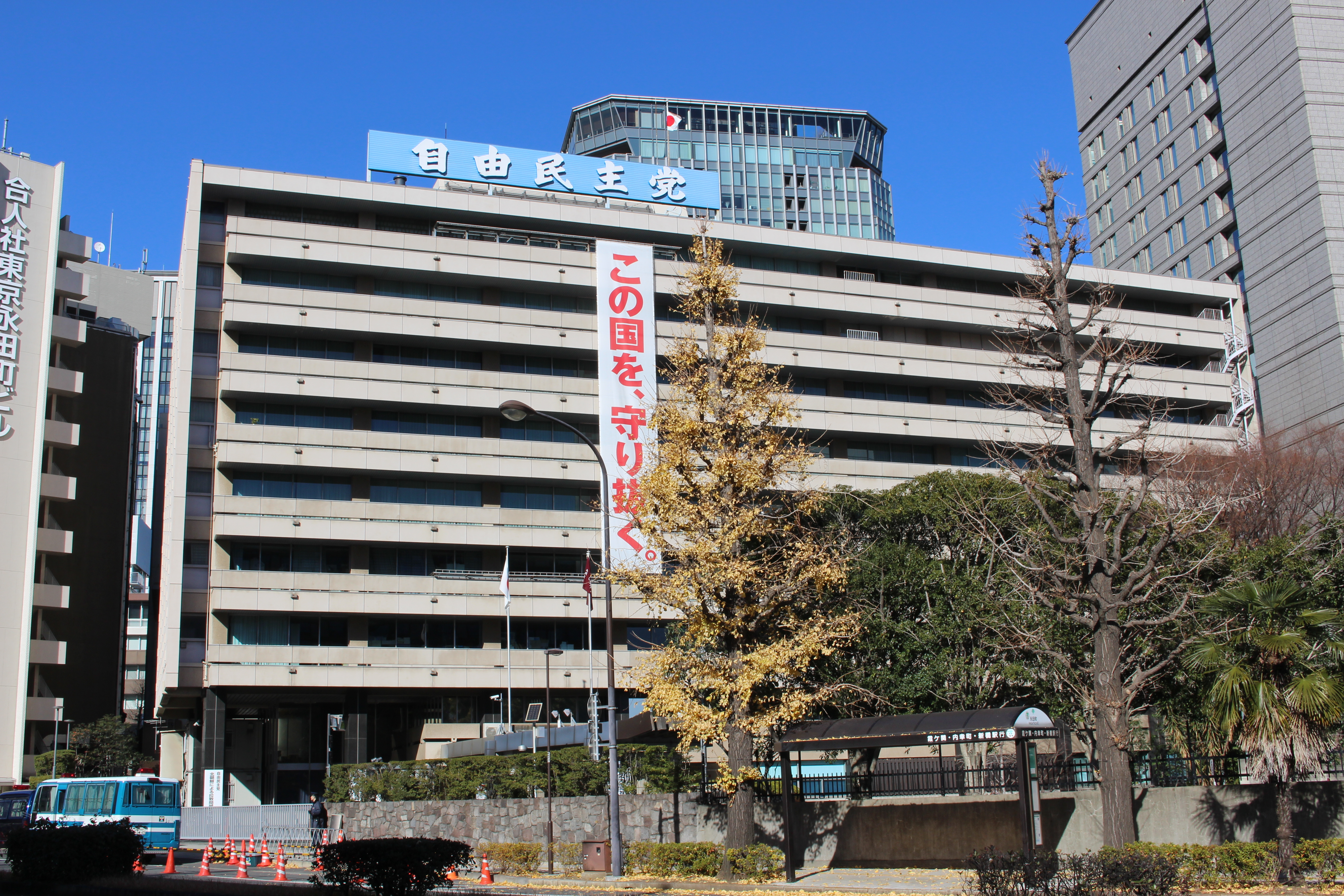
Liberal Democratic Hall Bldg., Headquarters of the LDP in Tokyo

The LDP's support continued to decline, with prime ministers changing rapidly, and the 2009 general election saw the party losing its majority, winning only 118 seats, marking the only time they would be out of the majority other than a brief period in 1993, until 2024. Since that time, numerous party members left to join other parties or form new ones, including Your Party, the Sunrise Party of Japan, and the New Renaissance Party. The party had some success in the 2010 House of Councilors election, netting 13 additional seats and denying the DPJ a majority. Shinzo Abe became the president again in September 2012 after a five-way race. The LDP returned to power with its ally Komeito after winning a clear majority in the 2012 general election after over three years in opposition. Abe became Prime Minister for the second time preceded by Yoshihiko Noda who was the leader of the DPJ.

Abe led LDP to a victory in the 2013 House of Councillors election, leading the party to control both houses of the Diet. In 2014, Abe called an early general election as a way to get support for his economic policies, The LDP again won the election. In July 2015, the party and Abe pushed for expanded military powers to fight in foreign conflict through the Legislation for Peace and Security, which was supported by Komeito. The LDP further solidified its majority in the 2016 House of Councillors election. The LDP won the 2017 general election, leading Abe to become the first LDP leader to win three consecutive general elections. The LDP lost its majority in the 2019 House of Councillors election, but maintained control of the upper house with its coalition partner Komeito; the coalition also lost the two-thirds majority needed to enact constitutional revision. Abe resigned in 2020, citing a remission of his illness. Yoshihide Suga took over from Abe in September 2020 after a three-way race.

After Suga declined to run for re-election, successor Fumio Kishida led the party to a victory in the 2021 general election after a four-way party leadership race, defying expectations. Despite support dropping in 2022 after the assassination of Abe over connections between various party members and the Unification Church, the party had a good showing in the 2023 unified local elections, winning over half of the 2260 prefectural assembly seats being contested and six governorship positions. From 18 to 19 January 2024, following the LDP slush fund scandal involving failure to report and misuse of ¥600 million in campaign funds by party members of the conservative Seiwa Seisaku Kenkyūkai and Shisuikai factions in violation of Japanese campaign finance and election law, three factions (Seiwa Seisaku Kenkyūkai, Shisuikai, in addition to Prime Minister Kishida's Kōchikai) all announced their intention to dissolve entirely in hopes of restoring public trust. Several LDP lawmakers were indicted, including incumbent lawmakers Yasutada Ōno and Yaichi Tanigawa, who both resigned from the party following their indictments. Kishida resigned in August 2024 over the scandal and low approval ratings, and was succeeded by Shigeru Ishiba.

=== 2024–present ===
In the 2024 Japanese general election, the governing LDP and its coalition partner Komeito lost their parliamentary majority in the lower house for the first time since 2009, with the LDP suffering its second-worst result in its history, securing only 191 seats. The Constitutional Democratic Party (CDP), the main opposition party led by former Prime Minister Yoshihiko Noda, achieved its best result in its history, increasing its seat count from 96 to 148. This was the first general election in Japan since 1955 wherein no party secured at least 200 seats. The election outcome is largely attributed to the major slush fund scandal that emerged in November. Prime Minister Shigeru Ishiba, called for a snap election in September to bolster support; however, the LDP's attempts to distance itself from the scandal backfired when reports surfaced that the party continued to provide funds to chapters headed by implicated members. In response to the election results, the prime minister has committed to implementing fundamental reforms regarding money in politics. The LDP's coalition partner Komeito also performed poorly, with its leader Keiichi Ishii losing his seat and subsequently announcing his resignation. This electoral setback is particularly significant for the LDP, which has held power almost continuously since 1955, highlighting the impact of the corruption scandal on public trust in the party.

In the 2025 House of Councillors election, the governing coalition lost its majority in the upper house. This marked the first time in the LDP's history that it did not control either house in the National Diet. After Ishiba announced his resignation, Sanae Takaichi was elected to succeed him. She is the first woman to hold the role of party president. In October 2025, Komeito chief representative Tetsuo Saito announced that it would leave the ruling coalition, over disagreements with Takaichi's leadership. As a result, Takaichi negotiated a confidence and supply agreement with the Japan Innovation Party. The agreement was signed on 20 October, with Takaichi then taking office as Japan's first female prime minister on 21 October. On 23 January 2026, Takaichi dissolved the House of Representatives, allowing a snap election to be held on 8 February. The 2026 general election resulted in a historic landslide victory for the LDP, with the party winning an outright two-thirds supermajority and regaining its majority status in the chamber. The LDP's total of at least 316 seats is the most ever won by a party in Japanese electoral history. Analysts credited the party's victory to Takaichi's high personal popularity at the time of the election.

== Ideology and political stance ==
Ideologically, the LDP is widely described as conservative, as well as nationalist. While usually associated with Japanese conservatism, Japanese nationalism, and being on the right-wing of the political spectrum, the party has been described as a variety of disparate ideologies, such as liberal-conservative, social-conservative, ultranationalist, and ultraconservative. The party has not espoused a well-defined and unified ideology or political philosophy due to its long-term government, and has been described as a catch-all party.

The LDP members hold a variety of positions that could be broadly defined as being to the right of main opposition parties. Many of its ministers, including former Prime Ministers Fumio Kishida, Yoshihide Suga, and Shinzo Abe, are or were affiliated with the parliamentary league of Nippon Kaigi, a lobby group described as far-right and ultraconservative. In Japanese politics, the convention is to classify the LDP and the Japanese Communist Party as occupying the conservative and progressive ends of the left–right spectrum, respectively; however, this classification has faced challenges, especially among younger generations, since the 1990s.

Observers compared the LDP to the corporatist-inspired model of conservative parties, such as the Christian Democratic Union of Germany, in its relative openness towards economic interventionism, mixed market coordination, and public expenditure, particularly when compared to neoliberal orthodoxy. In the case of the LDP administration under the 1955 System, their degree of economic control was stronger than that of Western conservative governments, and was positioned closer to social democracy. Since the 1970s, the oil crisis slowed economic growth and increased the resistance of urban citizens to policies that favor farmers. To maintain its dominant position, the LDP sought to expand party supporters by incorporating social security policies and pollution measures advocated by opposition parties. It was also historically closely positioned to corporate statism.

On foreign policy, the LDP has been pro-American. Into the 21st century, especially since the 2020s, the LDP established closer relations with its Indo-Pacific allies as a counter-power to China. In October 2021, the LDP said it would "reconsider" its response to the increase of China's military activity in the Taiwan Strait and small islands in the Western Pacific Ocean that are controlled by Japan but also claimed by China. The LDP government aimed to raise its defense budget "with an eye to bringing it even above two percent" of GDP from the one percent of past decades.

== Factions ==
Intense factionalism has characterized the Liberal Democratic Party's history and internal composition ever since its emergence in 1955. Despite the change of factions, their history can be traced back to their 1955 roots, a testament to the stability and institutionalized nature of Liberal Democratic Party factions. All major factions that have existed in the history of the party can be categorised into the following two groups: the Conservative Mainstream (保守本流), which originated from Shigeru Yoshida's Liberal Party, and the Conservative Substream (保守傍流), which traces its roots to Ichirō Hatoyama's Japan Democratic Party.

The Conservative Mainstream has traditionally been associated with moderate, welfarist, and centrist policies and has included the Kōchikai (historical members include Hayato Ikeda, Masayoshi Ōhira, Kiichi Miyazawa, Fumio Kishida, and Yoshimasa Hayashi), the Thursday Club (faction) (Kakuei Tanaka), and the Heisei Kenkyūkai (formerly Keiseikai, with historical members include Noboru Takeshita, Keizō Obuchi, Ryutarō Hashimoto, and Toshimitsu Motegi). The only extant faction, Shikōkai, is part of this group.

The Conservative Substream has typically included hard-line and nationalistic factions such as the Seiwa Seisaku Kenkyūkai (Takeo Fukuda, Shintaro Abe, Junichiro Koizumi, and Shinzo Abe) and the Shisuikai (formerly Seisaku Kagaku Kenkyūjo, associated with Yasuhiro Nakasone, Bunmei Ibuki, Shizuka Kamei, and Toshihiro Nikai). A notable exception within this group was the Banchō Seisaku Kenkyūjo (founded by Takeo Miki and Kenzō Matsumura), which was known for its leftist and progressive policies.

In the aftermath of the slush fund scandal involving members of the Seiwa Seisaku Kenkyūkai and the Shisuikai, then-party president and prime minister Fumio Kishida decided to dissolve all factions in January 2024. All factions, except for Shikōkai, led by former prime minister Tarō Asō, complied with this directive, making it the only extant faction.

Name	Ideology	Leader	Members
Shikōkai; 志公会	Conservatism; Big tent	Tarō Asō	56

== Structure ==
At the apex of the LDP's formal organization is the president (総裁, sōsai), who can serve three-year terms for three times. The presidential term was increased from two years to three years in 2002 and from two to three terms in 2017. When the party has a parliamentary majority, the party president is also the prime minister of Japan. The choice of party president is formally that of a party convention composed of National Diet members and local LDP figures, but in most cases, they merely approved the joint decision of the most powerful party leaders. To make the system more democratic, Prime Minister Takeo Fukuda introduced a "primary" system in 1978, which opened the balloting to some 1.5 million LDP members. The process was so costly and acrimonious that it was subsequently abandoned in favor of the old "smoke-filled room" method—so called in allusion to the notion of closed discussions held in small rooms filled with tobacco smoke. After the party president, the most important LDP officials are the Secretary-General (kanjichō), the chairmen of the LDP Executive Council (sōmukaichō), and of the Policy Affairs Research Council or "PARC" (政務調査会, seimu chōsakai).

Jiyu Minshu is the party newspaper. The LDP maintains a Students Division, as well as a Youth Division.

=== Leadership ===
Leadership as of 16 September 2026:

Position	Name	House	Faction
President	Sanae Takaichi	Representatives	None (ex-Seiwa Kai)
Vice President	Tarō Asō	Representatives	Shikōkai
Secretary-General	Shun'ichi Suzuki	Representatives	Shikōkai
Chairperson, General Council	Hiroshi Kajiyama	Representatives	None
Chairperson, Policy Research Council	Takayuki Kobayashi	Representatives	None (ex-Shisuikai)
Chairperson, Election Strategy Committee	Yasutoshi Nishimura	Representatives	None (ex-Seiwa Kai)
Chairperson, Organization and Movement Headquarters	Hirokazu Matsuno	Representatives	None (ex-Seiwa Kai)
Chairperson, Public Relations Headquarters	Takako Suzuki	Representatives	None (ex-Heisei)
Chairperson, Diet Affairs Committee	Hideki Murai	Representatives	None (ex-Kōchikai)
Executive Deputy Secretary-General	Kōichi Hagiuda	Representatives	None (ex-Seiwa Kai)
Chairperson, General Assembly of Party Members of the House of Councillors	Masaji Matsuyama	Councillors	None (ex-Kōchikai)
Secretary-General for the LDP in the House of Councillors	Kazuhiko Aoki	Councillors	None (ex-Heisei)
Chairperson, House of Councillors Policy Council	Shinsuke Suematsu	Councillors	None (ex-Seiwa Kai)
Chairperson, House of Councillors Diet Affairs Committee	Yoshihiko Isozaki	Councillors	None (ex-Kōchikai)

== Membership ==
The LDP had over 5.5 million party members in 1991. By December 2017, membership had dropped to approximately one million members. In 2023, the LDP had 1,091,075 members, a decrease of 33,688 from the year before. It declined further to 915,574 by 2025.

== Election results ==
=== Legislative results ===
==== House of Representatives ====
House of Representatives
Election	Leader	Seats			Position	Constituency votes		PR block votes		Status
Election	Leader	No.	±	Share	Position	No.	Share	No.	Share	Status
1958	Nobusuke Kishi	289 / 467		61.8%	1st	22,976,846	57.80%			Governing majority
1960	Hayato Ikeda	296 / 467	▲11	64.2%	1st	22,740,272	57.56%			Governing majority
1963	Hayato Ikeda	283 / 467	▼17	60.5%	1st	22,423,915	54.67%			Governing majority
1967	Eisaku Satō	277 / 486	▼6	56.9%	1st	22,447,838	48.80%			Governing majority
1969	Eisaku Satō	288 / 486	▲11	59.2%	1st	22,381,570	47.63%			Governing majority
1972	Kakuei Tanaka	271 / 491	▼17	55.1%	1st	24,563,199	46.85%			Governing majority
1976	Takeo Miki	249 / 511	▼22	48.7%	1st	23,653,626	41.78%			Governing majority
1979	Masayoshi Ōhira	248 / 511	▼1	48.5%	1st	24,084,131	44.59%			Governing majority
1980	Masayoshi Ōhira	284 / 511	▲36	55.5%	1st	28,262,442	47.88%			Governing majority
1983	Yasuhiro Nakasone	250 / 511	▼34	48.9%	1st	25,982,785	45.76%			LDP–NLC coalition
1986	Yasuhiro Nakasone	300 / 512	▲50	58.5%	1st	29,875,501	49.42%			Governing majority
1990	Toshiki Kaifu	275 / 512	▼25	53.7%	1st	30,315,417	46.14%			Governing majority
1993	Kiichi Miyazawa	223 / 511	▼52	43.6%	1st	22,999,646	36.62%			Opposition (until 1994)
1993	Kiichi Miyazawa	223 / 511	▼52	43.6%	1st	22,999,646	36.62%			LDP–JSP–NPS coalition (from 1994)
1996	Ryutaro Hashimoto	239 / 500	▲16	47.8%	1st	21,836,096	38.63%	18,205,955	32.76%	LDP–SDP–NPS coalition
2000	Yoshirō Mori	233 / 480	▼6	48.5%	1st	24,945,806	40.97%	16,943,425	28.31%	LDP–Komeito–NCP coalition
2003	Junichiro Koizumi	237 / 480	▲4	49.3%	1st	26,089,326	43.85%	20,660,185	34.96%	LDP–Komeito coalition
2005	Junichiro Koizumi	296 / 480	▲59	61.6%	1st	32,518,389	47.80%	25,887,798	38.20%	LDP–Komeito coalition
2009	Tarō Asō	119 / 480	▼177	24.7%	▼2nd	27,301,982	38.68%	18,810,217	26.73%	Opposition
2012	Shinzo Abe	294 / 480	▲175	61.2%	▲1st	25,643,309	43.01%	16,624,457	27.79%	LDP–Komeito coalition
2014	Shinzo Abe	291 / 475	▼3	61.2%	1st	25,461,427	48.10%	17,658,916	33.11%	LDP–Komeito coalition
2017	Shinzo Abe	284 / 465	▼7	61.0%	1st	26,719,032	48.21%	18,555,717	33.28%	LDP–Komeito coalition
2021	Fumio Kishida	259 / 465	▼25	55.7%	1st	27,626,235	48.08%	19,914,883	34.66%	LDP–Komeito coalition
2024	Shigeru Ishiba	191 / 465	▼68	41.1%	1st	20,867,762	38.46%	14,582,690	26.73%	LDP–Komeito minority coalition (until 2025)
2024	Shigeru Ishiba	191 / 465	▼68	41.1%	1st	20,867,762	38.46%	14,582,690	26.73%	LDP–JIP minority coalition (from 2025)
2026	Sanae Takaichi	316 / 465	▲125	67.9%	1st	27,789,183	49.23%	21,026,139	36.72%	LDP–JIP coalition

==== House of Councillors ====
House of Councillors
Election	Leader	Seats		Position	Nationwide (Note: From 1947 to 1980, 50 members were elected through a nationwide constituency, known as the "national block" (plurality-at-large voting). It was replaced in 1983 by a proportional representation block with closed lists. In 2001, the PR block was reduced to 48 members with most open lists.)		Prefecture		Status
Election	Leader	Total (Note: The Upper house is split in two classes, one elected every three years.)	Contested	Position	No.	%	No.	%	Status
1956	Ichirō Hatoyama	122 / 250	61 / 125	1st	11,356,874	39.7%	14,353,960	48.4%	Governing minority
1959	Nobusuke Kishi	132 / 250	71 / 125	1st	12,120,598	41.2%	15,667,022	52.0%	Governing majority
1962	Hayato Ikeda	142 / 250	69 / 125	1st	16,581,637	46.4%	17,112,986	47.1%	Governing majority
1965	Eisaku Satō	140 / 251	71 / 125	1st	17,583,490	47.2%	16,651,284	44.2%	Governing majority
1968	Eisaku Satō	137 / 250	69 / 125	1st	20,120,089	46.7%	19,405,546	44.9%	Governing majority
1971	Eisaku Satō	131 / 249	62 / 125	1st	17,759,395	44.5%	17,727,263	44.0%	Governing majority
1974	Kakuei Tanaka	126 / 250	62 / 125	1st	23,332,773	44.3%	21,132,372	39.5%	Governing majority
1977	Takeo Fukuda	125 / 249	63 / 125	1st	18,160,061	35.8%	20,440,157	39.5%	Governing minority
1980	Masayoshi Ōhira	135 / 250	69 / 125	1st	23,778,190	43.3%	24,533,083	42.5%	Governing majority
1983	Yasuhiro Nakasone	137 / 252	68 / 126	1st	16,441,437	35.3%	19,975,034	43.2%	Governing majority
1986	Yasuhiro Nakasone	143 / 252	72 / 126	1st	22,132,573	38.58%	26,111,258	45.07%	Governing majority
1989	Sōsuke Uno	109 / 252	36 / 126	1st	15,343,455	27.32%	17,466,406	30.70%	Governing minority
1992	Kiichi Miyazawa	106 / 252	68 / 126	1st	14,961,199	33.29%	20,528,293	45.23%	Governing minority (until 1993)
1992	Kiichi Miyazawa	106 / 252	68 / 126	1st	14,961,199	33.29%	20,528,293	45.23%	Minority (1993–1994)
1992	Kiichi Miyazawa	106 / 252	68 / 126	1st	14,961,199	33.29%	20,528,293	45.23%	LDP–JSP–NPS governing majority (from 1994)
1995	Yōhei Kōno	111 / 252	46 / 126	1st	10,557,547	25.40%	11,096,972	27.29%	LDP–JSP–NPS governing majority
1998	Ryutaro Hashimoto	102 / 252	44 / 126	1st	14,128,719	25.17%	17,033,851	30.45%	LDP–Liberal–Komeito governing majority (until 2000)
1998	Ryutaro Hashimoto	102 / 252	44 / 126	1st	14,128,719	25.17%	17,033,851	30.45%	LDP–Komeito–NCP governing majority (from 2000)
2001	Junichiro Koizumi	111 / 247	64 / 121	1st	21,114,727	38.57%	22,299,825	41.04%	LDP–Komeito–NCP governing majority (until 2003)
2001	Junichiro Koizumi	111 / 247	64 / 121	1st	21,114,727	38.57%	22,299,825	41.04%	LDP–Komeito governing majority (from 2003)
2004	Junichiro Koizumi	115 / 242	49 / 121	1st	16,797,686	30.03%	19,687,954	35.08%	LDP–Komeito governing majority
2007	Shinzo Abe	83 / 242	37 / 121	▼2nd	16,544,696	28.1%	18,606,193	31.35%	LDP–Komeito governing minority (until 2009)
2007	Shinzo Abe	83 / 242	37 / 121	▼2nd	16,544,696	28.1%	18,606,193	31.35%	Minority (from 2009)
2010	Sadakazu Tanigaki	84 / 242	51 / 121	2nd	14,071,671	24.07%	19,496,083	33.38%	Minority (until 2012)
2010	Sadakazu Tanigaki	84 / 242	51 / 121	2nd	14,071,671	24.07%	19,496,083	33.38%	LDP–Komeito governing minority (from 2012)
2013	Shinzo Abe	115 / 242	65 / 121	▲1st	18,460,404	34.7%	22,681,192	42.7%	LDP–Komeito governing majority
2016	Shinzo Abe	121 / 242	56 / 121	1st	20,114,833	35.9%	22,590,793	39.9%	LDP–Komeito governing majority
2019	Shinzo Abe	113 / 245	57 / 124	1st	17,712,373	35.37%	20,030,330	39.77%	LDP–Komeito governing majority
2022	Fumio Kishida	119 / 248	63 / 125	1st	18,256,245	34.43%	20,603,298	38.74%	LDP–Komeito governing majority
2025	Shigeru Ishiba	101 / 248	39 / 125	1st	12,808,307	21.64%	14,470,017	24.46%	LDP–Komeito governing minority (until 2025)
2025	Shigeru Ishiba	101 / 248	39 / 125	1st	12,808,307	21.64%	14,470,017	24.46%	LDP–JIP governing minority (from 2025)
2025	Shigeru Ishiba	101 / 248	39 / 125	1st	12,808,307	21.64%	14,470,017	24.46%	LDP–JIP coalition

== See also ==
- List of political parties in Japan

== Bibliography ==
- Helms, Ludger (2013). Parliamentary Opposition in Old and New Democracies. Routledge Press. ISBN 978-1-31797-031-6.
- Henderson, Jeffrey (2011). East Asian Transformation: On the Political Economy of Dynamism, Governance and Crisis. Taylor & Francis. ISBN 978-1-13684-113-2.
- Köllner, Patrick (October 2006). "The Liberal Democratic Party at 50: Sources of Dominance and Changes in the Koizumi Era". Social Science Japan Journal. 9 (2): 243–257. doi:10.1093/ssjj/jyl026.
- Krauss, Ellis S.; Pekkanen, Robert J. (2010). "The Rise and Fall of Japan's Liberal Democratic Party". Journal of Asian Studies. 69 (1): 5–15. doi:10.1017/S0021911809992555. It focuses on the 2009 Japanese general election.
- Krauss, Ellis S.; Pekkanen, Robert J., eds. (2010). The Rise and Fall of Japan's LDP: Political Party Organizations as Historical Institutions. Cornell University Press. ISBN 978-0-80147-682-2. 344-page book with essays by scholars.
- Scheiner, Ethan (2006). Democracy Without Competition in Japan: Opposition Failure in a One-Party Dominant State. Cambridge University Press. ISBN 978-0-52184-692-9.
