= The Hokkaido Shimbun =

Regional newspaper in Japan

- Front page of The Hokkaido Shimbun on November 14, 2023
- Type: Daily newspaper
- Owner: The Hokkaido Shimbun Press
- President: Yuji Horii
- Editor-in-chief: Takeshi Yamamoto
- Founded: November 1, 1942; 84 years ago
- Political alignment: Center-left; Liberalism (Japanese)
- Language: Japanese
- Headquarters: Odori Higashi 4-chome, Chūō-ku, Sapporo, Hokkaido, Japan
- Country: Japan
- Circulation: ▼690,000 (as of April 2026)
- Price: Single: ¥180 (US$1.14); Subscription: ¥4,300 (US$27.16)
- Website: www.hokkaido-np.co.jp

Headquarters of the Hokkaido Shimbun Press in Sapporo.

The Hokkaido Shimbun (Japanese: 北海道新聞, Hepburn: Hokkaidō Shinbun), which is often abbreviated as Doshin (道新, Dōshin), is a Japanese language daily regional newspaper published mainly in Hokkaidō, Japan by The Hokkaido Shimbun Press. As of April 2026, its morning edition has a circulation of 690,000. It was first published in Sapporo in 1887 as Hokkai Shimbun. During World War II, it merged with 11 other newspapers in Hokkaido to form the current newspaper.

Alongside the print media, it also published the online sports newspaper Doshin Sports (道新スポーツ, Dōshin Supōtsu), and the online newspaper Hokkaido Shimbun Digital.

== History ==
Hokkai Shimbun (北海新聞), the predecessor of the The Hokkaido Shimbun, was founded on January 20, 1887. The current newspaper was founded on November 1, 1942, following the merger of 11 newspapers in Hokkaido as part of the wartime newspaper consolidation policy of the Empire of Japan. The newspaper grew following the war, building new branches and becoming a nationally recognised actor, and was a regionally dominant media organisation due to Hokkaido's remote location at the time until 1959, when national newspapers such as The Yomiuri Shimbun, The Asahi Shimbun and Mainichi Shimbun build factories in Hokkaido. On December 1, 1979, the newspaper's morning edition surpassed 1 million copies in circulation. Doshin Sports (道新スポーツ) began publication on September 1, 1982. On April 23, 1996, it launched the Doshin website.

In 2011, The Hokkaido Shimbun, alongside Kodansha and Junposha, was sued by Tomoyoshi Sasaki, former head of the Hokkaido Prefectural Police's General Affairs Department, after Kodansha and Junposha released a book about the alleged Hokkaido Prefectural Police slush fund scandal. The newspaper was ordered to pay ¥720,000 (2011) (US$9,021.76).

The Doshin Sports website was launched in April 2022. The newspaper suspended the publication of print edition of the Doshin Sports on November 30, 2022, and went fully digital.

It launched the website Hokkaido Shimbun Digital on January 10, 2023. On September 30, 2023, it suspended the publication of the evening edition of the newspaper, citing rising raw materials costs.

On November 1, 2024, it moved its headquarters from Odori Nishi 3-chome in central Sapporo to Odori Higashi 4-chome in the same city. In October 2026, the Federal Security Service (FSB) arrested a The Hokkaido Shimbun journalist for allegations of spying in Russia. The journalist was identified as Yuki Imai, assigned to the paper's Yuzhno-Sakhalinsk bureau, who was arrested by the FSB before he was due to fly back to Japan. Imai is being held for pre-trial detention to December 12, 2026.

== Contents and features ==
Average circulation of The Hokkaido Shimbun (2010–2025)
Year	Circulation (Note: Average circulation in the second half of each year)	Change
2010	1,150,000	—N/a
2011	1,140,000	▼ −0.87%
2012	1,120,000	▼ −1.75%
2013	1,100,000	▼ −1.79%
2014	1,070,000	▼ −2.73%
2015	1,050,000	▼ −1.87%
2016	1,030,000	▼ −1.90%
2017	1,000,000	▼ −2.91%
2018	970,000	▼ −3.00%
2019	940,000	▼ −3.09%
2020	900,000	▼ −4.26%
2021	870,000	▼ −3.33%
2022	840,000	▼ −3.45%
2023	810,000	▼ −3.57%
2024	750,000	▼ −10.71%
2025	710,000	▼ −5.33%

By 2012, Hokkaido Shimbun was the 19th most-read newspaper in the world according to the World Association of Newspapers. As of April 2026, the newspaper has approximately 690,000 copies in circulation. The morning edition of the newspaper consists of 28 to 32 pages, which cover news, opinion, editorials, sports, television and radio listings, and obituaries. The evening edition, on the other hand, ranged from 10 to 14 pages, which covered news, sports, culture, entertainment, science and business.

To commemorate the newspaper's 80th anniversary, it distributed limited-edition "Kombu Shimbun" (昆布新聞) in November 2022 in front of its head office in Chūō-ku, Sapporo. It is made from Hokkaido kombu (kelp) and features history about kombu fishing written in edible ink.

=== Hokkaido Shimbun Literary Prize ===
The newspaper also holds the Hokkaido Shimbun Literary Prize (北海道新聞文学賞, Hokkaidō Shinbun Bungaku-shō), also known as the Doshin Literature Awards (道新文学賞, Dōshin Bungaku-shō). It was established in 1967. It has two categories, "creative writing/critique" and "poetry". The prize is only allowed to be given to authors who are a resident or former resident of Hokkaido for more than three years.

== Editorial stance ==
The newspaper's editorial stance was described as liberal, with a center-left political alignment. It strongly advocated for a "comprehensive peace treaty" about the Treaty of San Francisco. It opposed the revision of the U.S.-Japan Security Treaty in 1960 and criticized the forced passage of the treaty. It also criticized the Treaty on Basic Relations Between Japan and the Republic of Korea. It maintained a consistent stance on the post-war constitution.

== Company ==
The newspaper is published by The Hokkaido Shimbun Press (株式会社北海道新聞社, Kabushiki-gaisha Hokkaidō Shinbunsha). It is headquartered in Odori Higashi 4-chome, Chūō-ku, Sapporo, Hokkaido, Japan. The current company president has been Yuji Horii since April 1, 2025. The current editor-in-chief is Takeshi Yamamoto since April 1, 2026.

The company also owned Hokkaido Broadcasting (HBC), Hokkaido Cultural Broadcasting (UHB), and Television Hokkaido (TVh).

== See also ==
- Liberalism in Japan
