= 47NEWS =

Japanese news aggregator website

- Logo
- Website type: News aggregator
- Available in: Japanese
- Area served: Japan
- Owners: Press Net Japan Co., Ltd.
- Website: 47news.jp
- Advertising: yes
- Commercial: yes
- Launched: December 24, 2006; 19 years ago
- Current status: Active

47NEWS (Note: Pronounced as Yon Nana Nyūsu) is a Japanese news aggregator website run by Press Net Japan Co., Ltd. It was launched in December 2006.

== History ==
It was launched on December 24, 2006, by Kyodo News and the Press Net Japan (国新聞ネット), which includes 52 national, regional, and local newspapers across Japan. The sites' name refers to the 47 prefectures of Japan. It aims to "enhance the nationwide information dissemination capabilities of local newspapers by uniting the 52 companies".

Following the 2011 Great East Japan earthquake, the website received 3,680,000 visitors in March 2011.

The official Twitter account of 47NEWS was shut down on July 22, 2011, following criticism about a staff member who repeatedly made inappropriate posts in the account, such as "In Japan, a life sentence is effectively an acquittal".

On December 1, 2025, Kyodo News and 48 newspapers sent a letter of protest against Perplexity AI for allegedly illegally copying and using articles distributed on the website starting in August 2024.

== Features ==
It features news from 52 newspapers across Japan, as well as Kyodo News, such as the main news and article videos of the day, politics, economics, society, international affairs, sports, and travel. On its release, its key feature is the ability to view news linked to maps located at the upper left corner of the homepage. "Hot News" section, which features "humorous and heartwarming news" from across Japan, directly from the map.

It also has a system that includes a mechanism to extract the day's trending keywords and display a list of news articles related to those keywords. Advertising is integrated with a system that allows for placement in conjunction with some of the participating newspapers.

A revamp in April 2008 added a new section called "Columns from Newspapers Across Japan," allowing users to compare columns from each company, and a "Topics" section that gathers columns and related articles on timely themes that are of interest to readers.

A web application was also created following the launch of Chrome Web Store in Japan in May 2011. On July 7, 2013, it launched the "47NEWS" mobile app for iPhone and Android for 2013 Japanese House of Councillors election.

== Press Net Japan ==
Press Net Japan
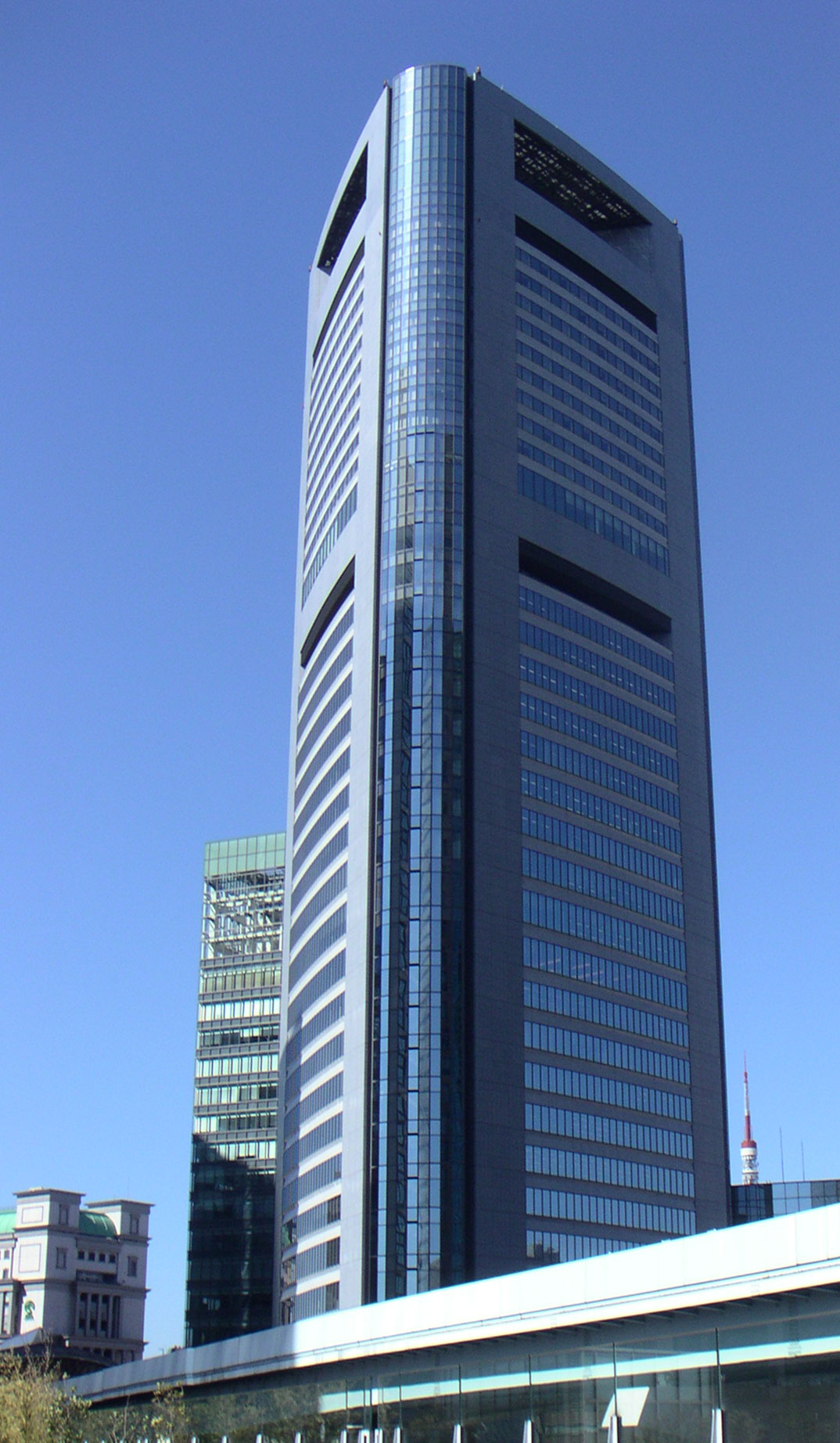
- Shiodome Media Tower
- Native name: 株式会社全国新聞ネット
- Romanized name: Kabushiki-gaisha Zenkoku Shimbun Netto
- Type: Private
- Industry: News
- Founded: September 16, 2006; 20 years ago in Tokyo
- Headquarters: Shiodome Media Tower, Higashi-Shinbashi, Minato-ku, Tokyo, Japan
- Area served: Japan
- Brands: 47NEWS
- Website: www.pnjp.jp

Press Net Japan Co., Ltd. (PNJ) (株式会社全国新聞ネット, Kabushiki-gaisha Zenkoku Shimbun Netto) was established on September 15, 2006 with collaboration with 47 newspaper companies. It is headquartered at Shiodome Media Tower, Higashi-Shinbashi, Minato-ku, Tokyo.

=== Members ===
- Hokkaido Shimbun
- Muroran Minpo
- Kahoku Shimpō
- Tō-Ō Nippō
- Daily Tohoku
- Akita Sakigake Shimpō
- Yamagata Shimbun
- Iwate Nippo
- Fukushima Minpo
- Fukushima Minyu Shimbun
- Sankei Shimbun
- The Nikkei
- The Japan Times
- Shimotsuke Shimbun
- Ibaraki Shimbun
- Jōmō Shimbun
- Chiba Nippo
- Kanagawa Shimbun
- Saitama Shimbun
- Yamanashi Nichinichi Shimbun
- Shinano Mainichi Shimbun
- Niigata Nippo
- Chunichi Shimbun
- Ise Shimbun
- Shizuoka Shimbun
- Gifu Shimbun
- Kitanippon Shimbun
- Hokkoku Shimbun
- Fukui Shimbun
- The Kyoto Shimbun
- Kobe Shimbun
- Kii Minpo
- Sanyo Shimbun
- Chugoku Shimbun
- Nihonkai Shimbun
- Yamaguchi Shimbun
- San-in Chuo Shimpo
- The Shikoku Shimbun
- Ehime Shimbun
- Kochi Shimbun
- Nishinippon Shimbun
- Oita Godo Shimbun
- Miyazaki Nichinichi Shimbun
- Nagasaki Shimbun
- Saga Shimbun
- Kumamoto Nichinichi Shimbun
- Minami Nihon Shimbun
- Okinawa Times
- Ryūkyū Shimpō
- Kyodo News

== See also ==
- List of newspapers in Japan
