= Park Hotel Tokyo =

Hotel in Tokyo, Japan

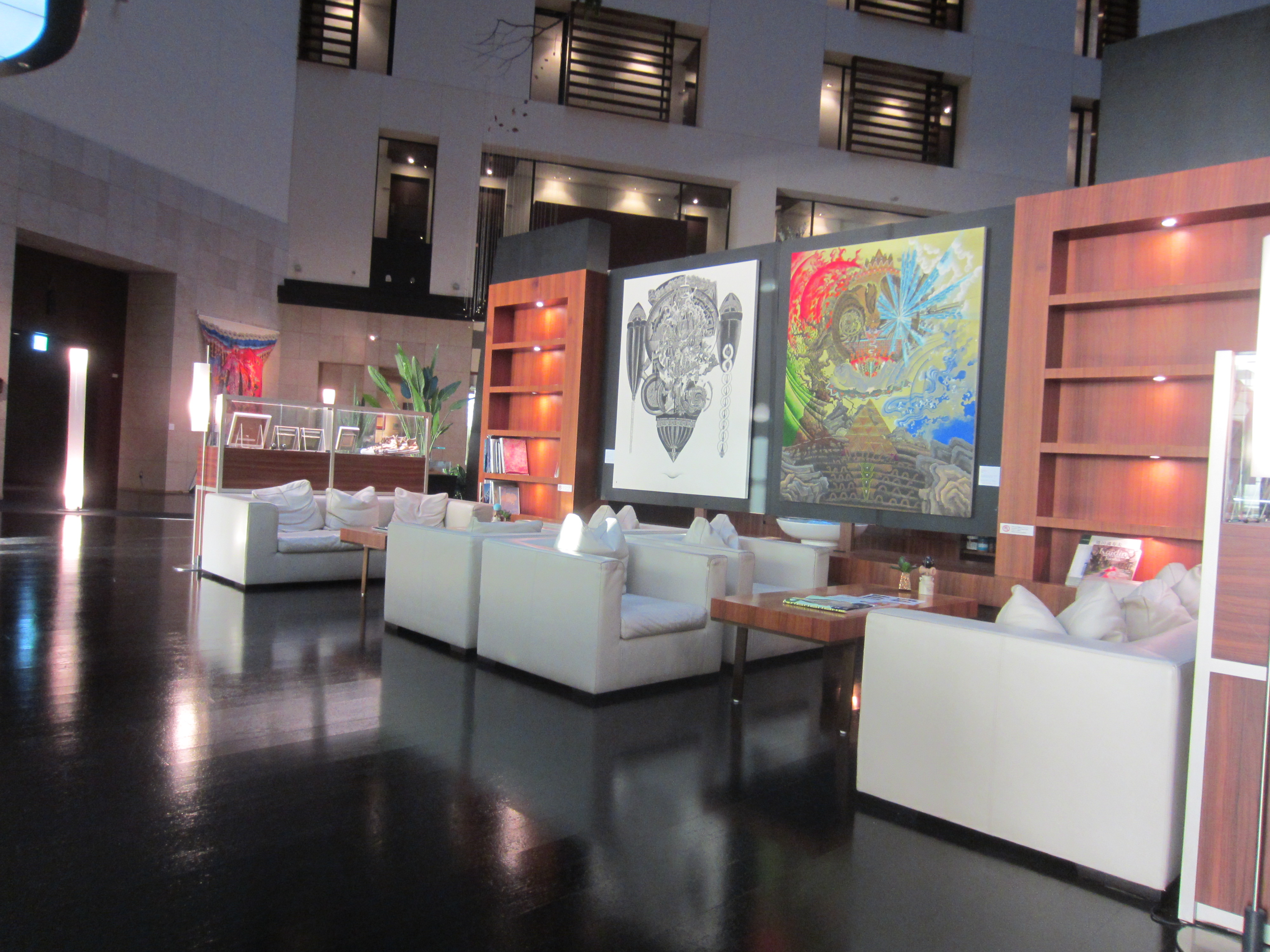
- Hotel lobby, 2019

General information
- Location: Tokyo, Japan
- Coordinates: 35.6630°N 139.7594°E
- Opened: 2003

Website
- parkhoteltokyo.com

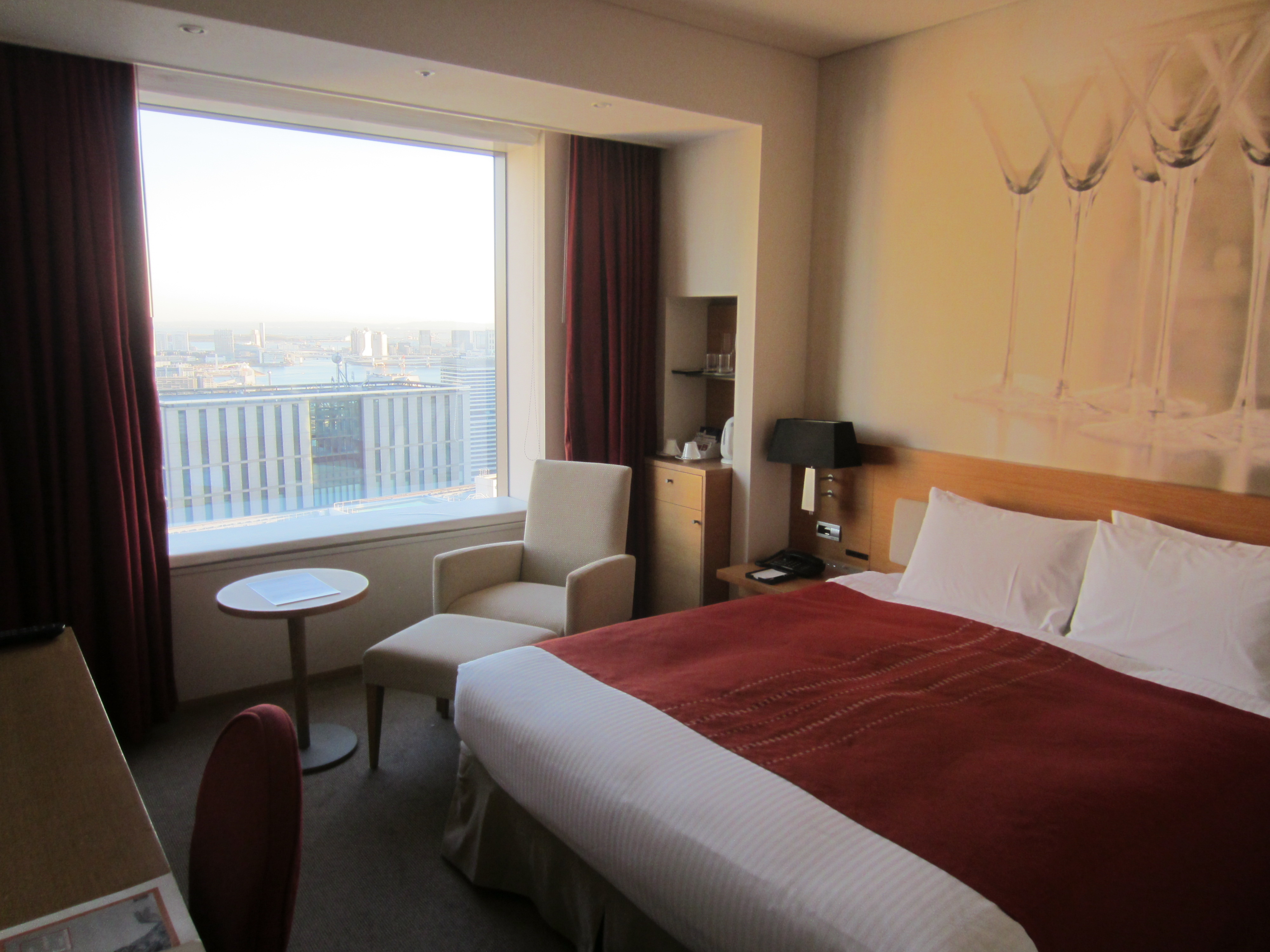
Room interior in 2019

Park Hotel Tokyo (パークホテル東京) is a hotel occupying floors 25 to 34 of the Shiodome Media Tower in Higashi-Shinbashi, Minato, Tokyo, Japan. It is operated by Shiba Park Hotel Co., Ltd. and has been part of the RIHGA Royal Hotel group since November 2024.

== History ==
The hotel opened in July 2003 as the first sister property of Shiba Park Hotel.

== Ownership ==
In November 2024, Royal Hotel Co., Ltd. increased its stake in Shiba Park Hotel Co., Ltd., bringing Park Hotel Tokyo and its sister property, Shiba Park Hotel, into the RIHGA Royal Hotel group.

== Reception ==
The Daily Telegraph has rated the hotel seven out of ten. In 2025, Forbes named Park Hotel Tokyo the Best Hotel in Tokyo for Art Lovers in a list of the city's ten best hotels. The Independent included Park Hotel Tokyo's Utopia in Japan suite in a 2026 overview of the city's most romantic hotels.
