= Sung Il-ho =

North Korean diplomat

Song Il-ho(송일호, born April 1955) is a North Korean diplomat. His current position is ambassador in charge of negotiations for normalization of diplomatic relations between Japan and North Korea.He graduated from Pyongyang Normal University ( majoring in Japanese ), and although he has never studied abroad, he speaks fluent Japanese.

== Person ==
He has served on the Central Committee of the Socialist Youth League (currently the Socialist Patriotic Youth League ), as a standing committee member of the North Korea-Japan Friendship Association (appointed in June 1985), as Japan Division Director of the International Department of the Workers' Party of Korea, and as a researcher at the Ministry of Foreign Affairs. After serving as Deputy Director-General of the Ministry of Foreign Affairs, he became the ambassador in charge of negotiations for the normalization of diplomatic relations with Asahi.

On April 17, 2010, he made a public appearance after a long time, and he replied that the exclusion of Korean schools at this time under Japan's high school free school law would be ethnic discrimination, calling for good work, and that if it was made free of charge, what needed to be done in the abduction issue would be done. (Kyodo News in Pyongyang)

On September 9, 2015, in an interview with Kyodo News, he said that the report on the abductions was almost completed.

On October 5, 2016, he met with members of the Fukuoka Prefecture Japan-North Korea Friendship Association.

On September 18, 2019, he attended a meeting with the delegation headed by Shingo, the second son of Nobuo Kanamaru, a former deputy governor of the Liberal Democratic Party, and said that "Concrete actions on the Part of a Japanese necessary.
