= Gion Matsuri =

Traditional Japanese Festival in Kyoto

Gion Festival (Gion Matsuri)
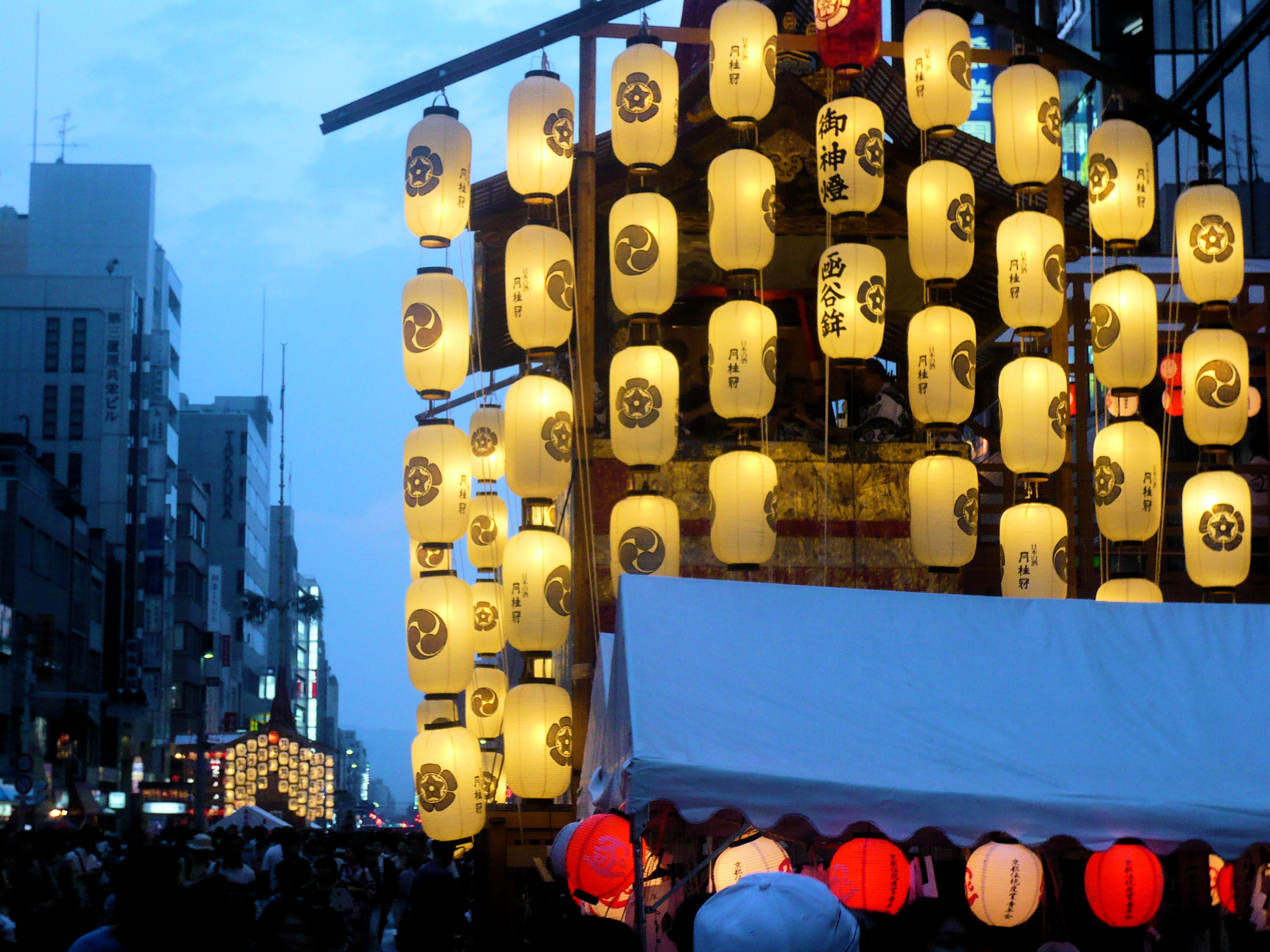
- Yoiyama during the Gion Festival
- Observed by: Kyoto
- Type: Religious
- Begins: 1 July
- Ends: 31 July
- Date: Month of July

The Gion Festival (祇園祭, Gion Matsuri) is one of the largest and most famous festivals in Japan, taking place annually during the month of July in Kyoto. Many events take place in central Kyoto and at the Yasaka Shrine, the festival's patron shrine, located in Kyoto's famous Gion district, which gives the festival its name. It is formally a Shinto festival, and its original purposes were purification and pacification of disease-causing entities. There are many ceremonies held during the festival, but it is best known for its two Yamaboko Junkō (山鉾巡行) processions of floats, which take place on July 17 and 24.

The three nights leading up to each day of a procession are sequentially called yoiyoiyoiyama (宵々々山), yoiyoiyama (宵々山), and yoiyama (宵山). During these yoiyama evenings, Kyoto's downtown area is reserved for pedestrian traffic, and some traditional private houses near the floats open their entryways to the public, exhibiting family heirlooms in a custom known as the Folding Screen Festival (屏風祭り, Byōbu Matsuri). Additionally, the streets are lined with night stalls selling food such as yakitori (barbecued chicken on skewers), taiyaki, takoyaki (fried octopus balls), okonomiyaki, traditional Japanese sweets, and many other culinary delights.

== History ==
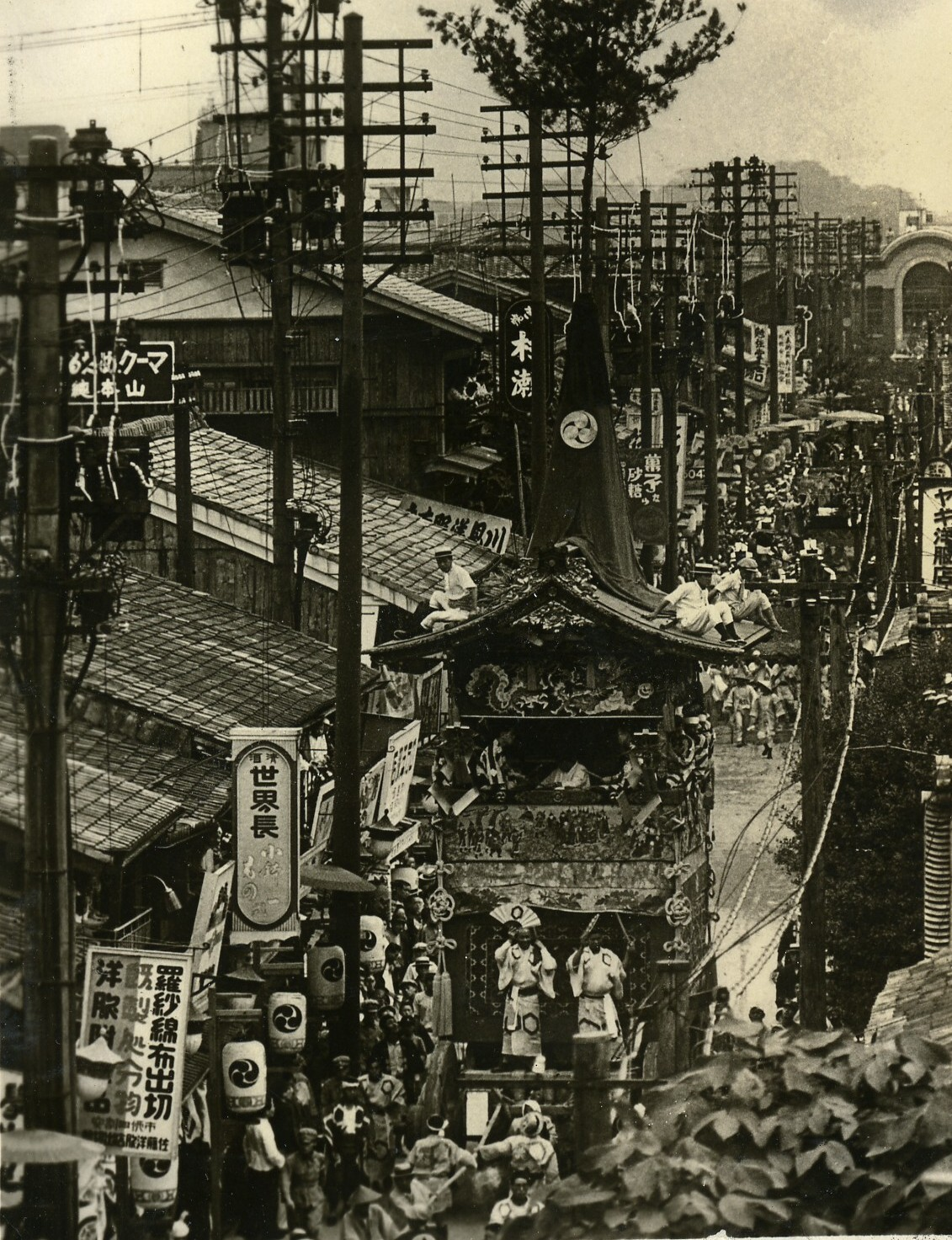
The parade held in Kyoto in the 1920s

=== Ancient years ===
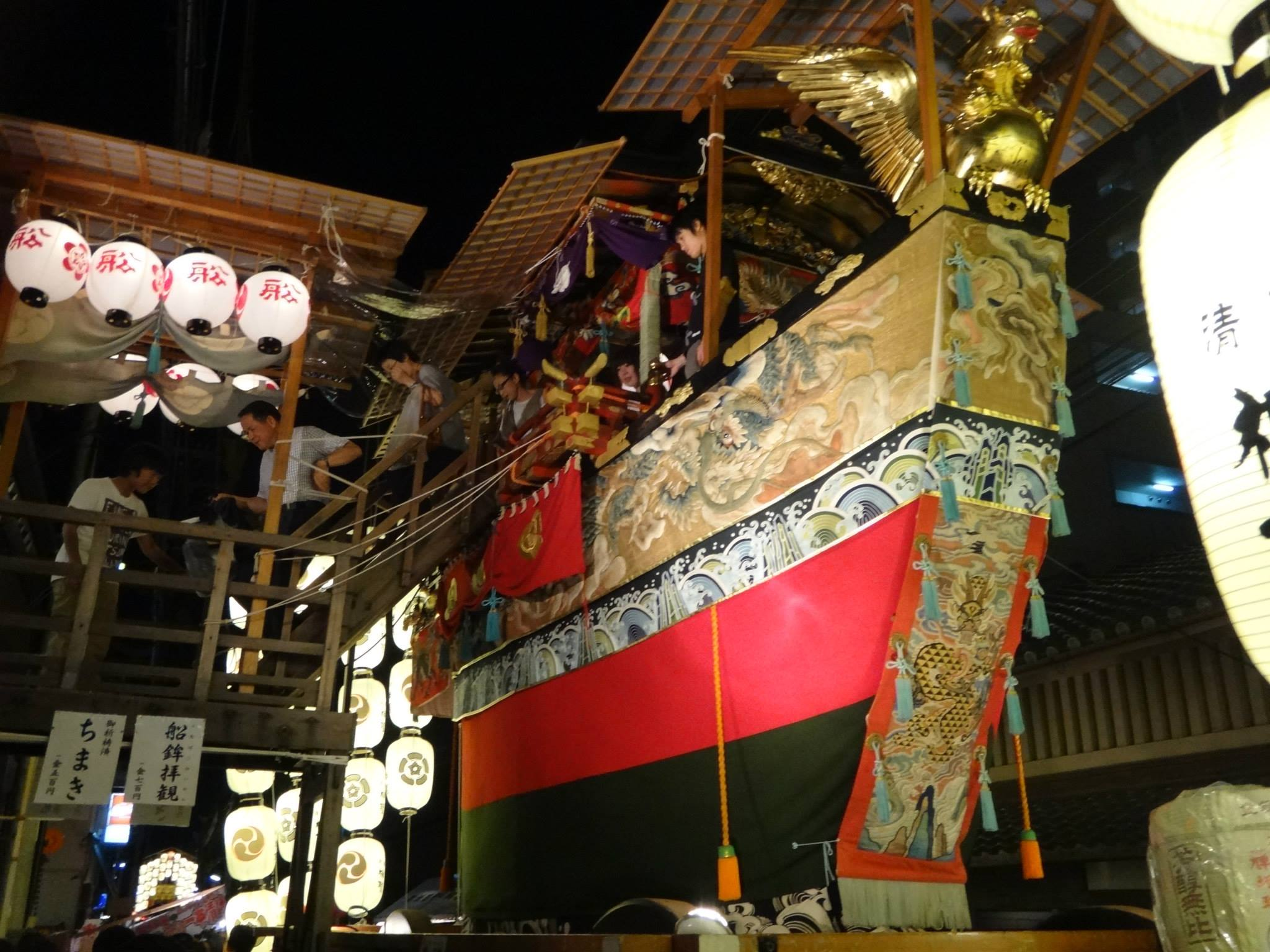
Traditional wooden floats in Gion Matsuri 2014

The Gion Festival originated during an epidemic as part of a purification ritual (御霊会, goryo-e) to appease the gods thought to cause fire, floods, and earthquakes. In 869, when people were suffering from a plague attributed to vengeful spirits, Emperor Seiwa ordered prayers to Gozo Tenno, the god of the Yasaka Shrine, then known as Gion Temple. Sixty-six stylized and decorated halberds, one for each of the traditional provinces of Japan, were prepared and erected at Shinsen-en, a garden in the south of the imperial palace, along with mikoshi (御輿, 'portable shrines') from Yasaka Shrine. This practice was repeated wherever an outbreak of plague occurred. By the year 1000, the festival became an annual event and it has since seldom failed to take place. During the civil Onin War (under the Ashikaga shogunate), central Kyoto was devastated, and the festival was halted for three decades in the late 15th and early 16th centuries. Later in the 16th century, it was revived by Oda Nobunaga.

Gozu Tennō ("Ox-Head Heavenly King") was a syncretic guardian deity whose origins trace to an Indian tutelary deity of the Jetavana monastery (Gion Shōja); the cult was later merged in China with esoteric Buddhist, Taoist, and Yin-Yang beliefs before reaching Japan, where it fused with Onmyōdō and came to be identified with the kami Susanoo. The temple-shrine complex housing his cult, then known as Gion Kanjin'in, was renamed Yasaka Jinja only in the Meiji era, as part of the government's policy of shinbutsu bunri (the forced separation of kami worship from Buddhism), a change subsequently adopted by many other Gion shrines throughout Japan.

Over the centuries, some floats have been destroyed or otherwise lost, and in recent years several have been restored. Float neighborhood associations sometimes purchase antique tapestries to replace worn or destroyed ones, or commission replicas from industrial weavers in Kyoto, or design and commission new ones from the weavers of Kyoto's famous traditional Nishijin weaving district. When they are not in use, the floats and regalia are kept in special storehouses throughout the central district of Kyoto, or at Yasaka Shrine.

The festival serves as an important setting in Yasunari Kawabata's novel, The Old Capital, in which he describes the Gion Festival as one of "the 'three great festivals' of the old capital", along with the Festival of Ages and the Aoi Festival.

=== Modern times ===
In July 1912, Kyoto Governor Ōmori Shōichi decided to ban the Gion Parade following the track-laying project of streetcar and road widening in Kyoto, citing that it was a "private festival of one city shrine". Festival organizers fought back, reminding the governor of the vast crowds visiting Kyoto at festival time. Kyoto Hinode Shimbun, a newspaper in Kyoto, also fought back and launched an anti-ban campaign by publishing a series of critical pieces by eminent scholars, including Kyoto University professor Ichimura Mitsue, who claimed that the ban on the float parade meant "the death of the Gion Festival, and the death of Gion was the death of Kyoto". Following pressure from the campaign, Kyoto Governor Ōmori unbanned the parade.

=== Gallery ===
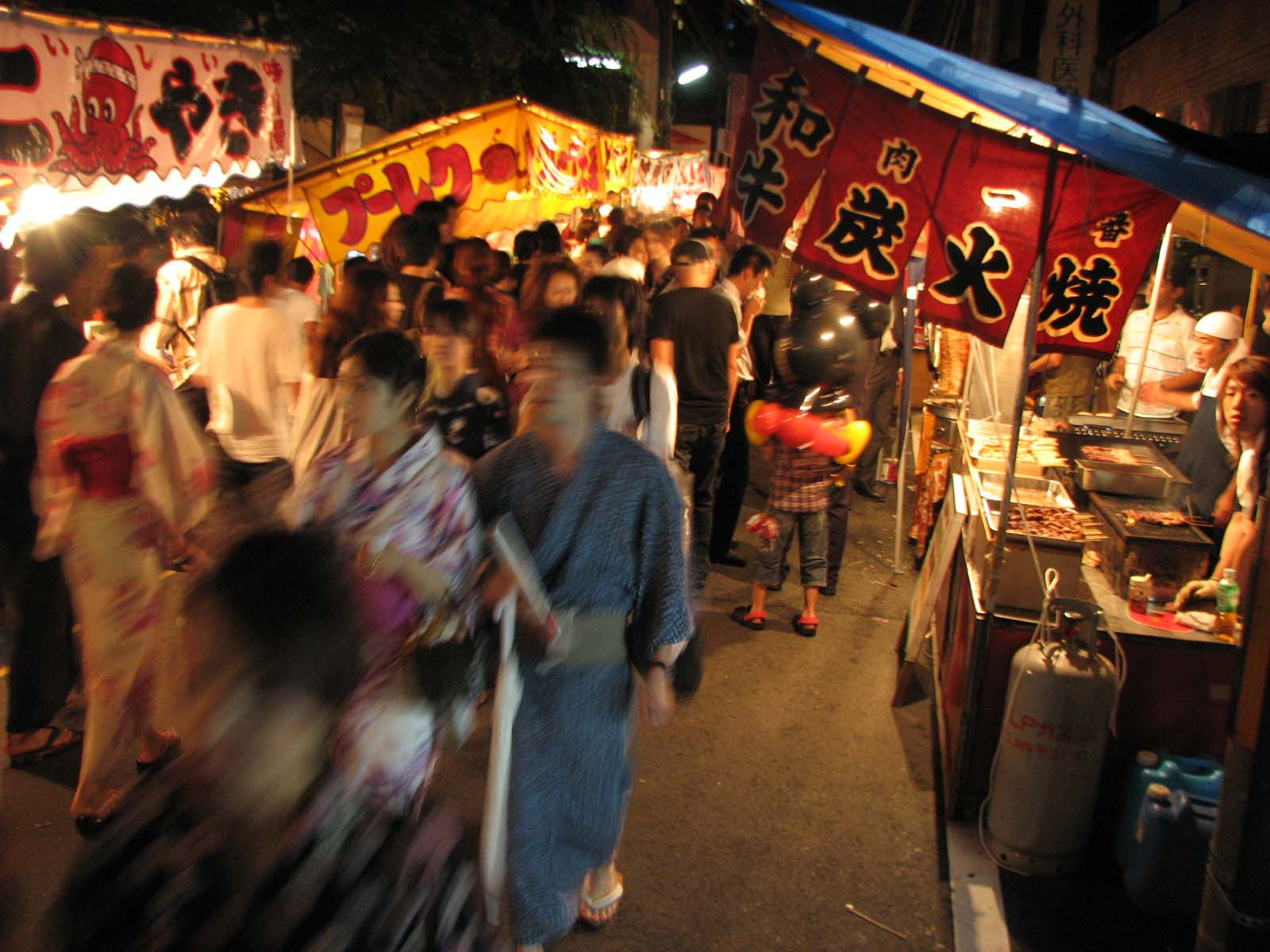
Festival street with food and craft vendors

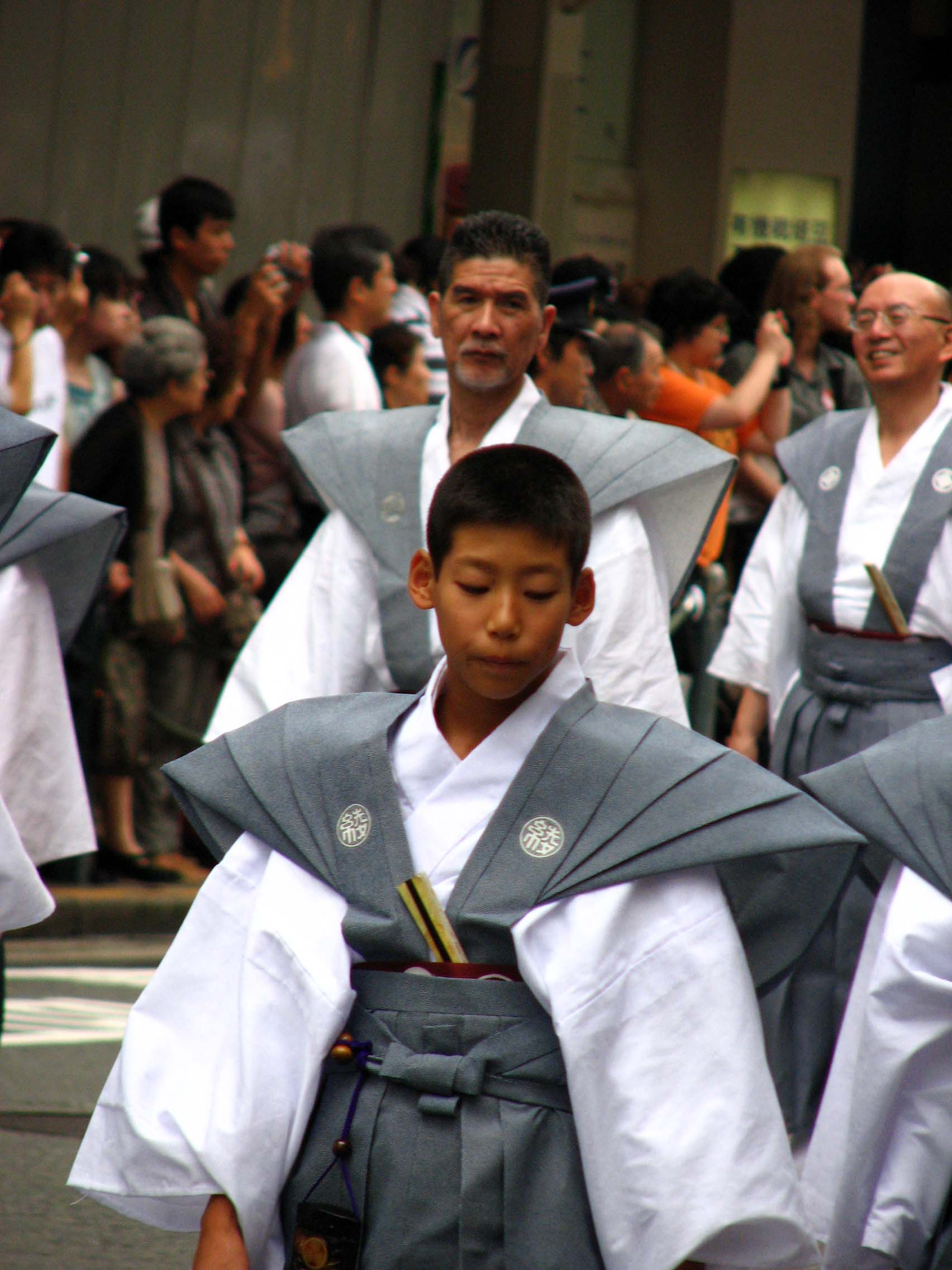
Ayagasaboko float marchers

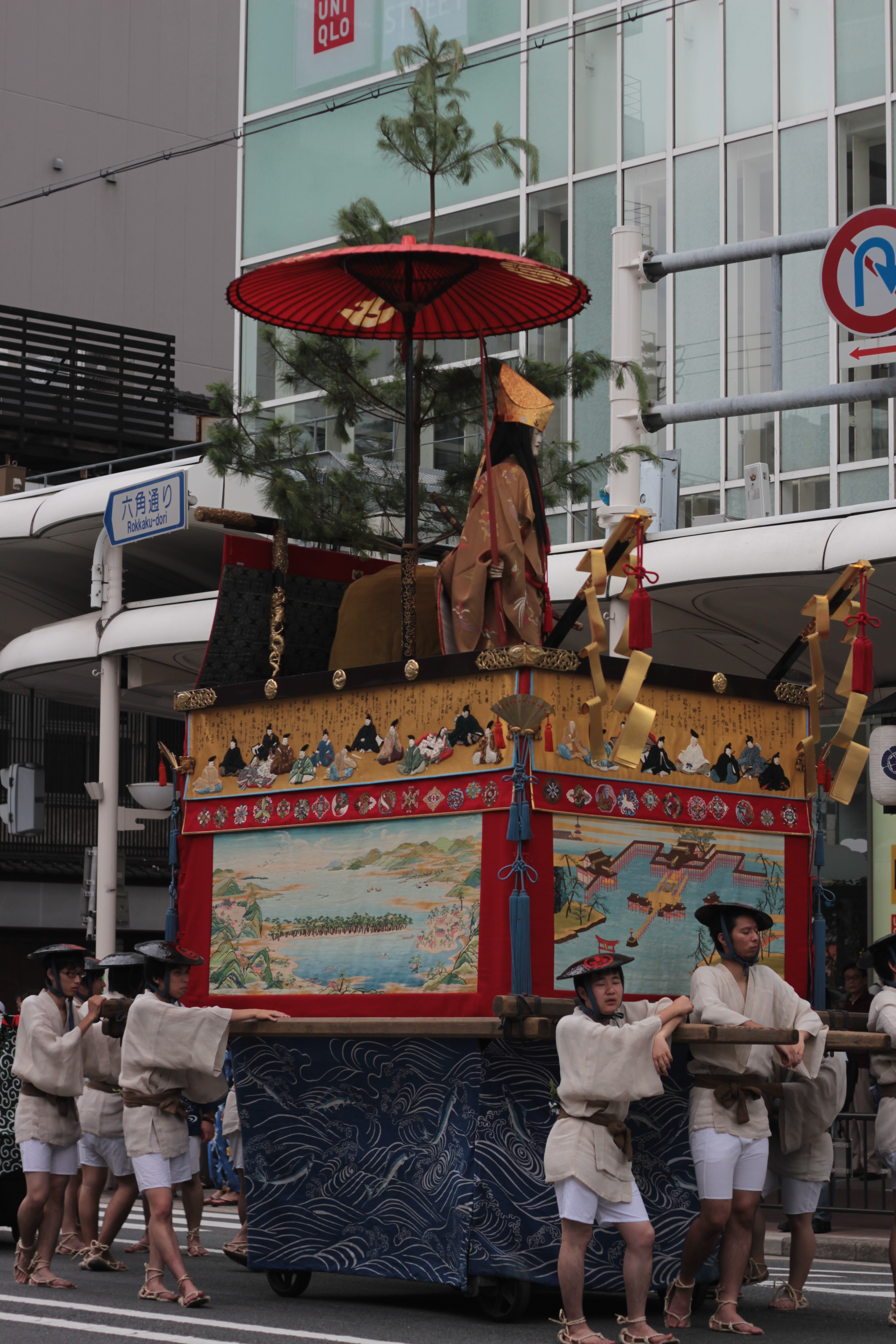
A yamaboko float (2013)

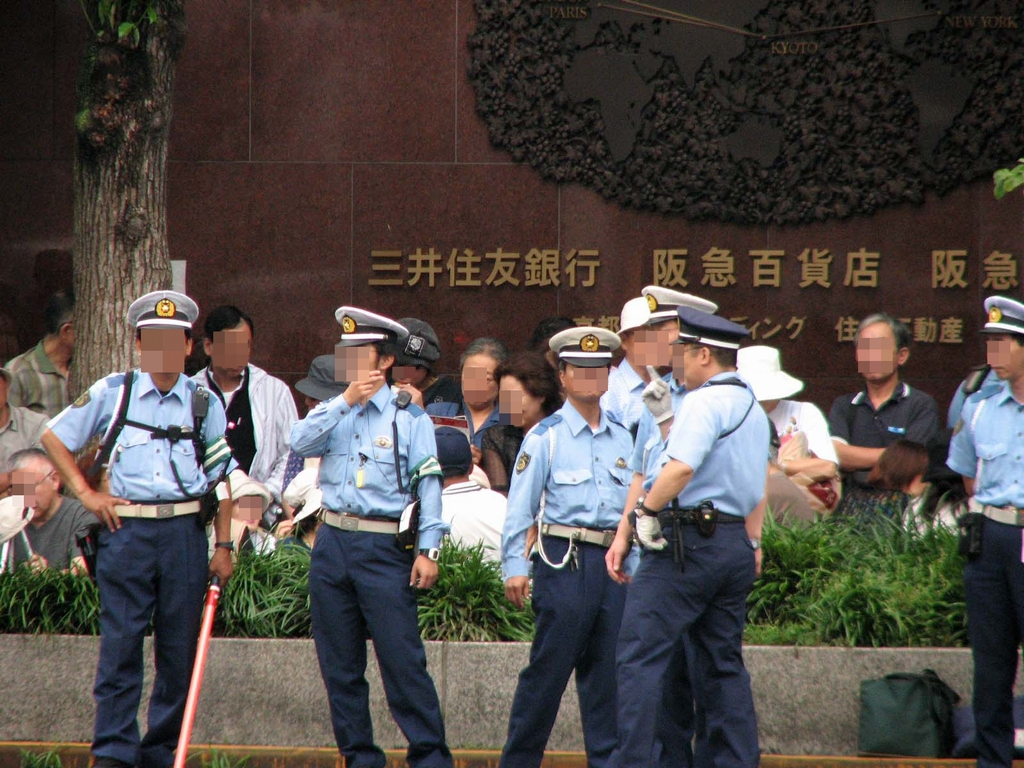
Police standing ready

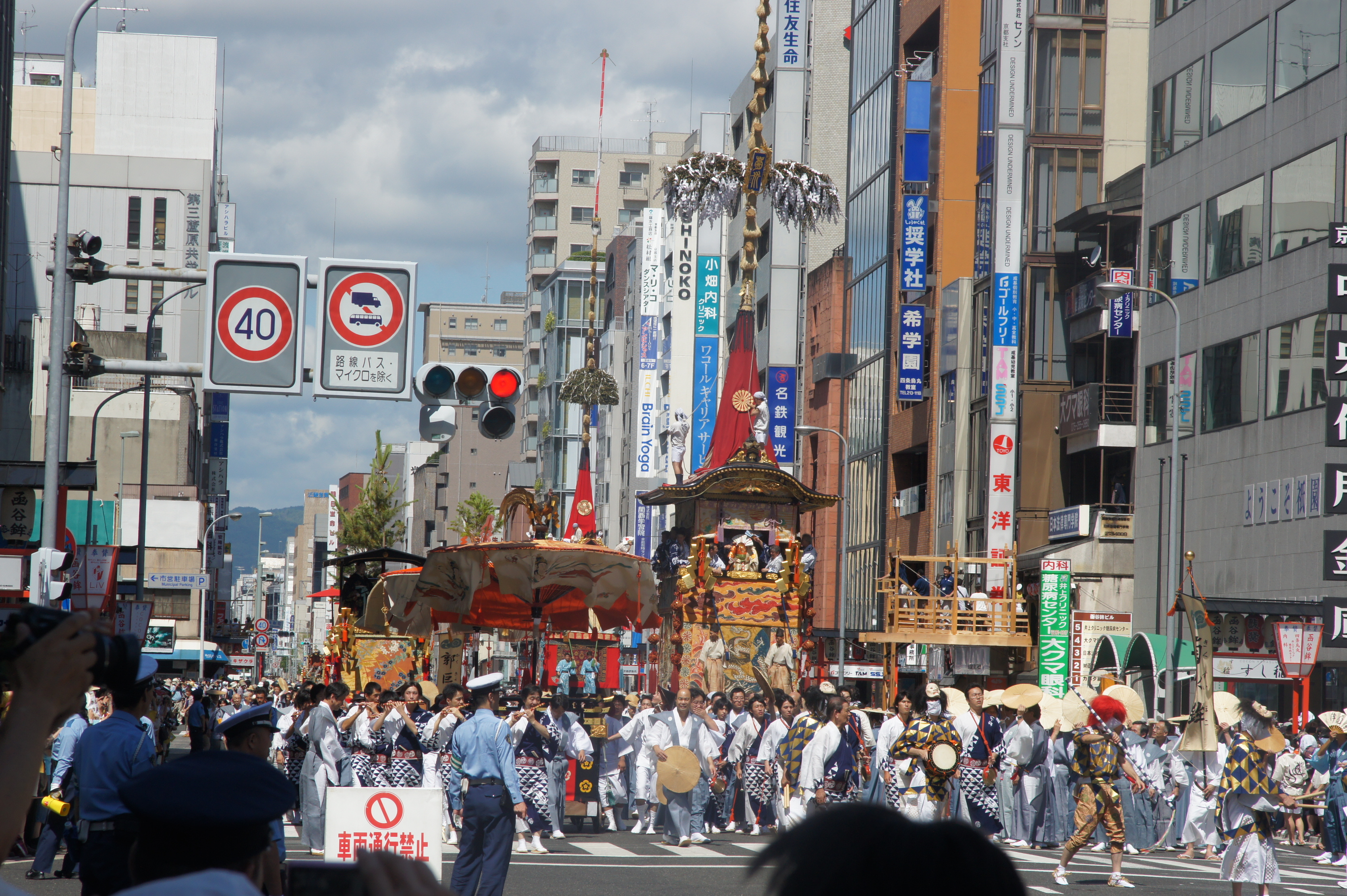

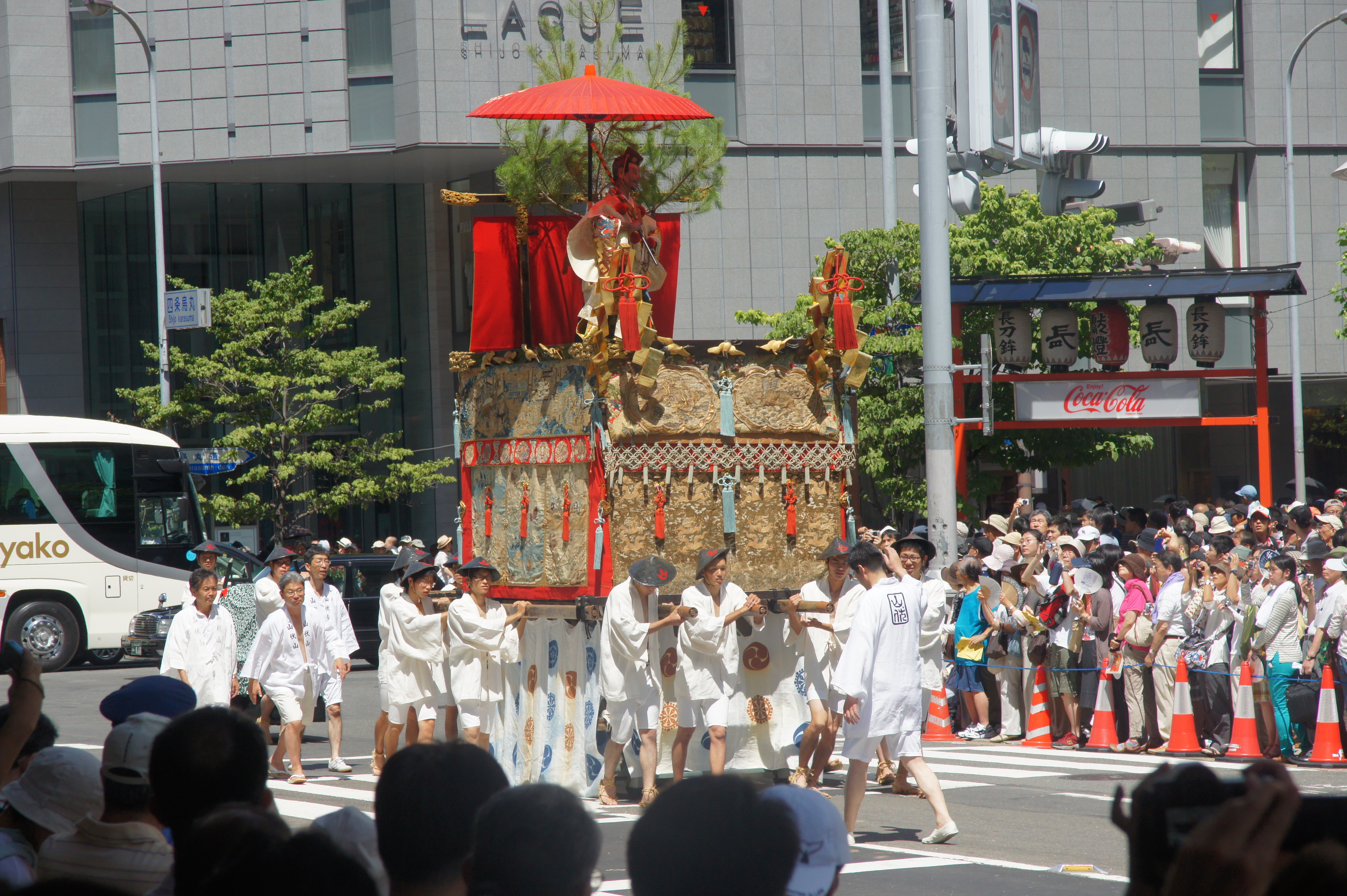

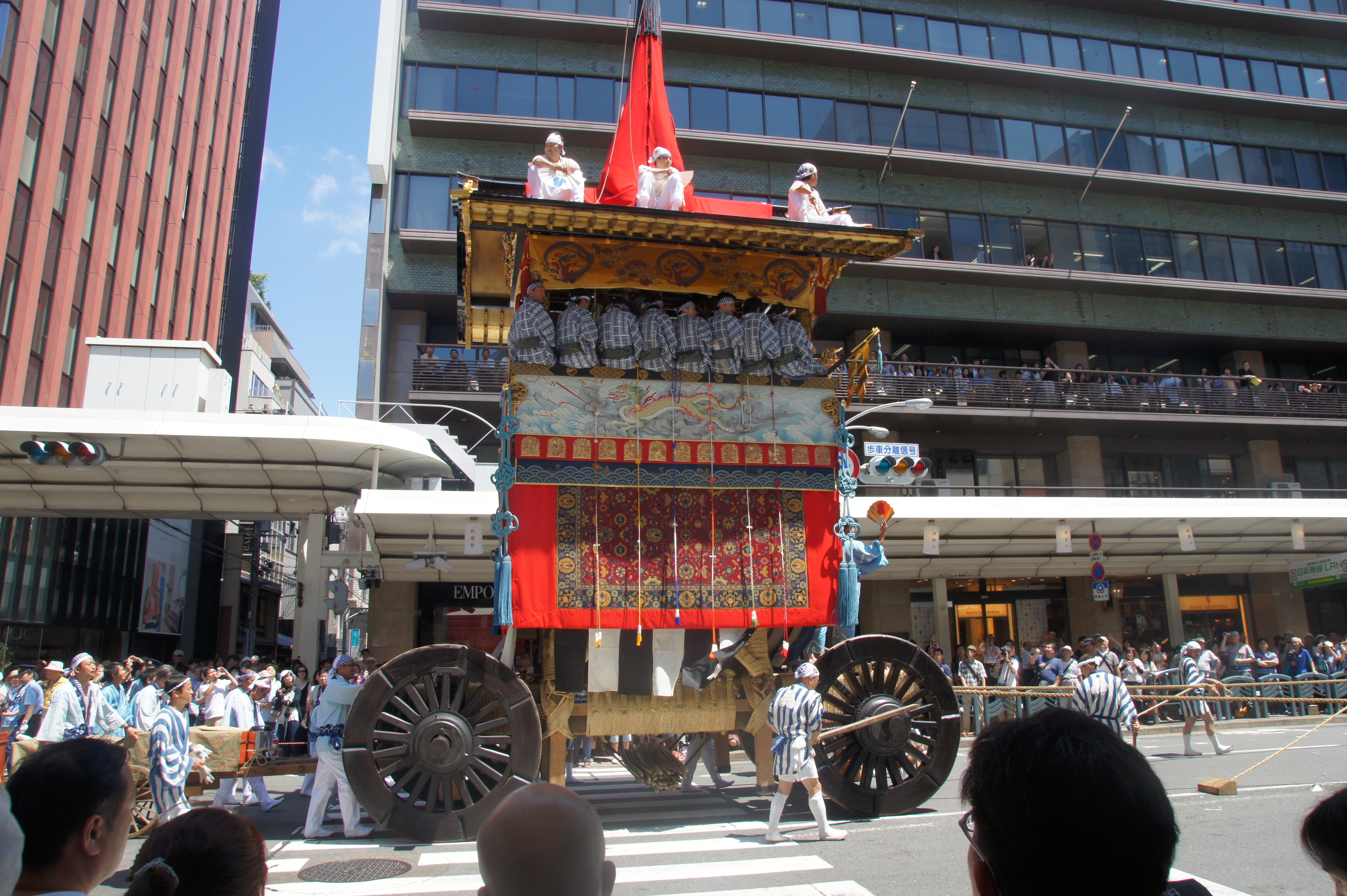

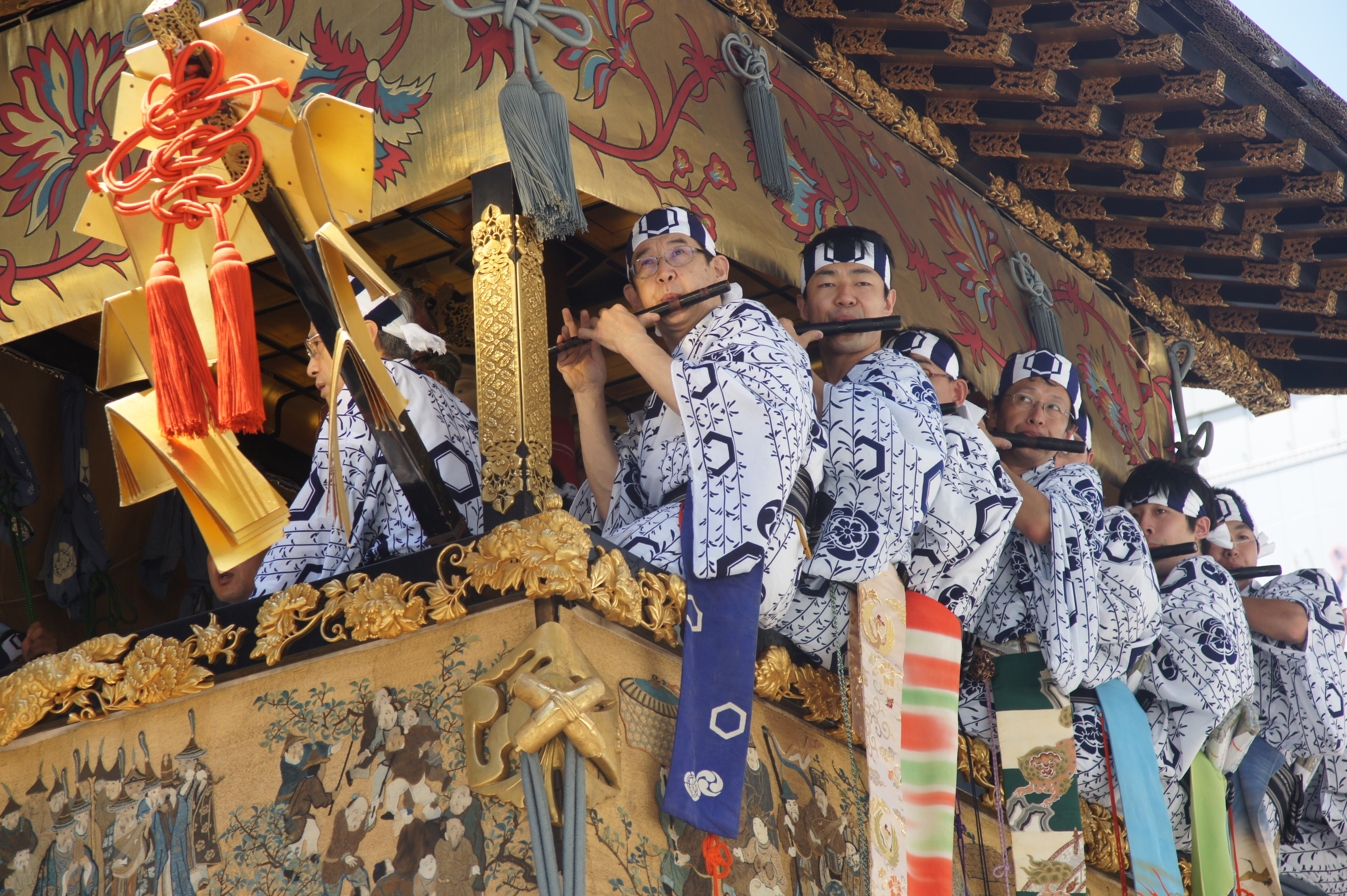

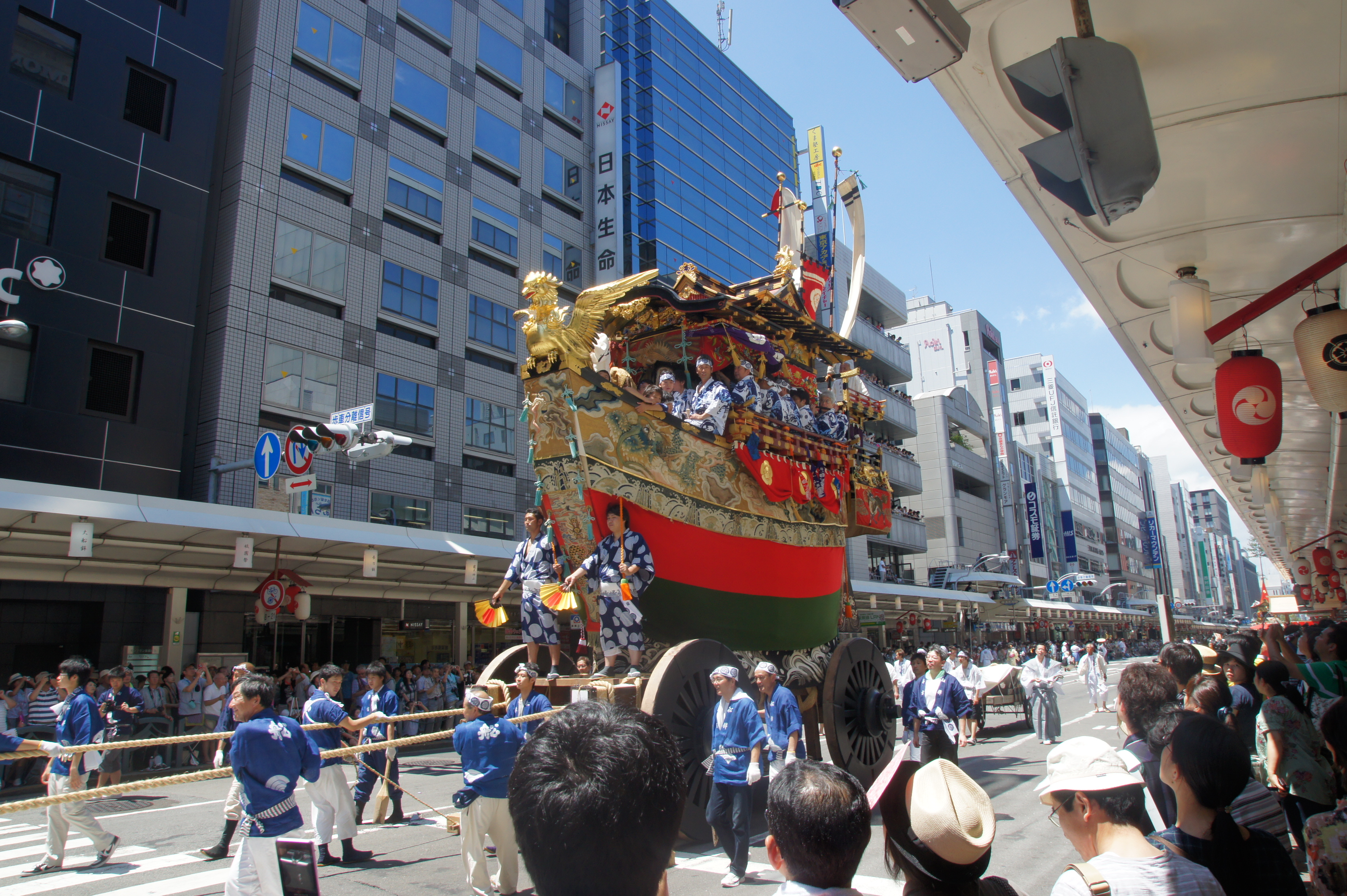

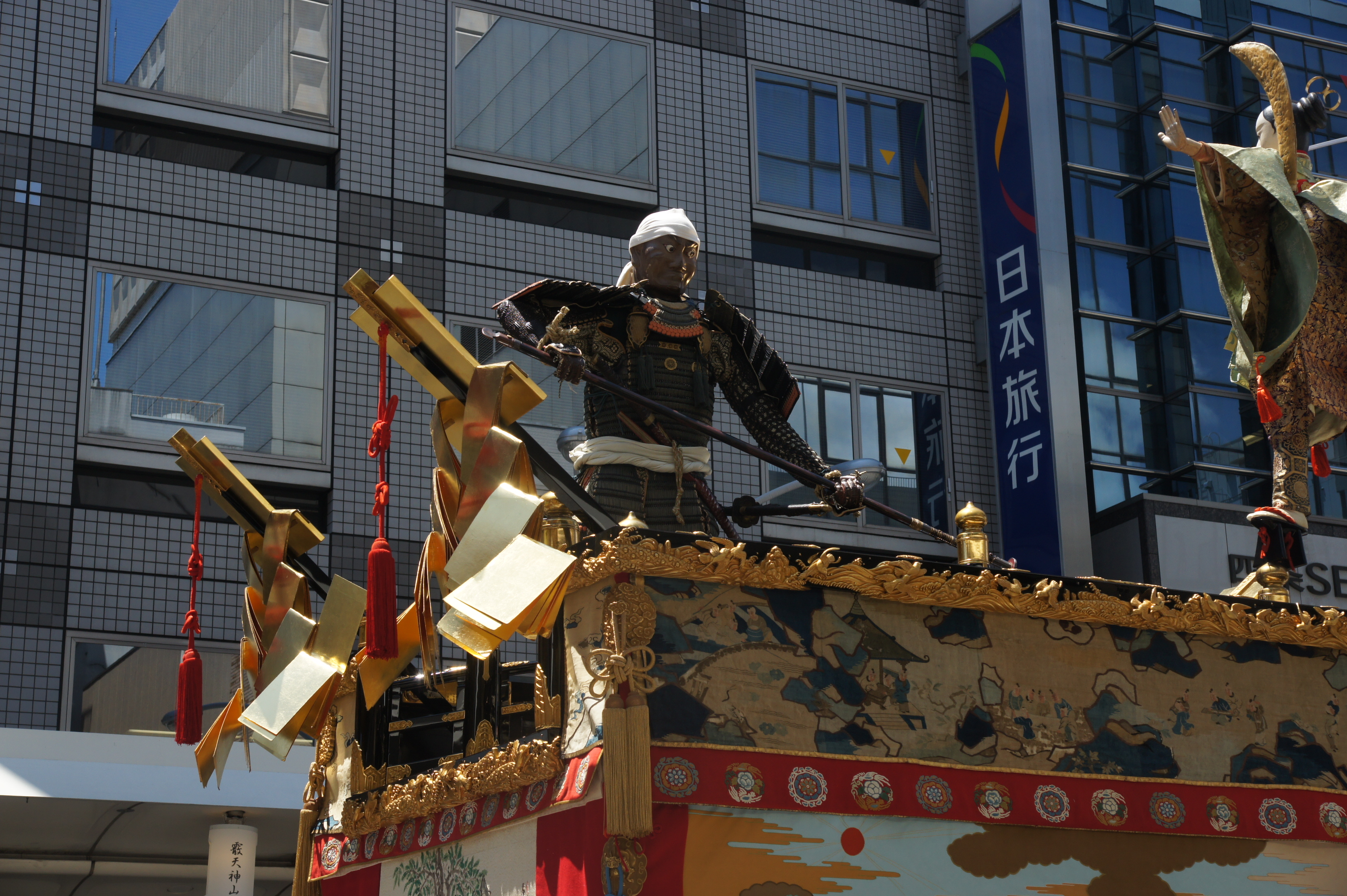

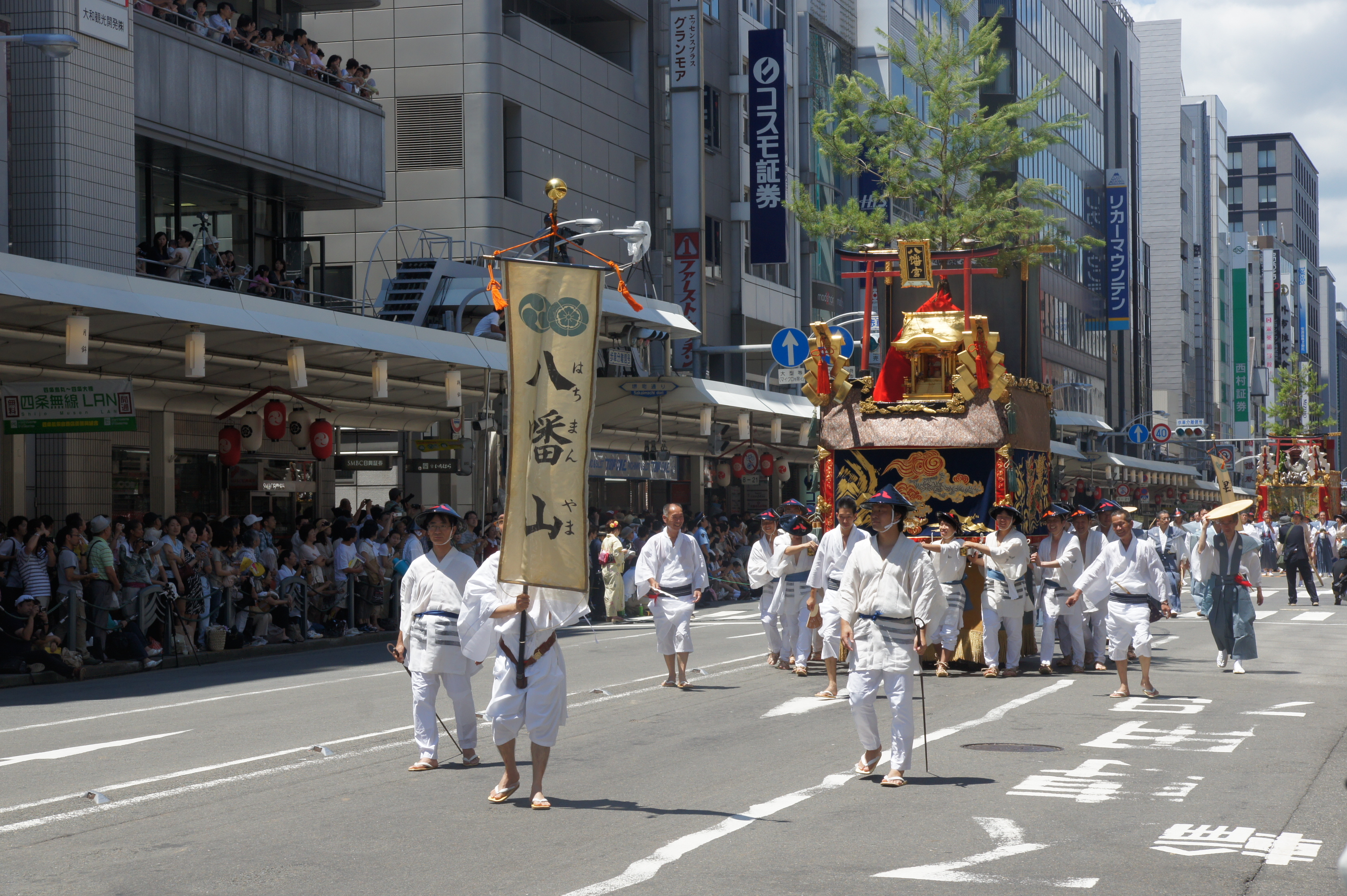

== Schedule of events ==
Following is a list of selected annual events in the Gion Festival.

- July 1–5: Kippuiri, opening ceremony of festival in each participating neighborhood
- July 2: Kujitorishiki, a lottery to determine the order of floats in the parade, conducted at the municipal assembly hall
- July 7: Shrine visit by chigo children of Ayagasaboko
- July 10: Lantern parade to welcome mikoshi (御輿, 'portable shrines')
- July 10: Mikoshi arai, cleansing of mikoshi with sacred water from the Kamo River
- July 10–13: Building of floats
- July 13 (a.m.): Shrine visit by chigo children of Naginataboko
- July 13 (p.m.): Shrine visit by chigo children of Kuse Shrine
- July 14: Yoiyoiyoiyama
- July 15: Yoiyoiyama
- July 16: Yoiyama
- July 16: Yoimiya shinshin hono shinji, art performances
- July 17: Parade of yamaboko floats
- July 17: Parade of mikoshi from Yasaka Shrine
- July 18–20: Building of floats
- July 21: Yoiyoiyoiyama
- July 22: Yoiyoiyama
- July 23: Yoiyama
- July 24: Parade of yamaboko float
- July 24: Parade of hanagasa (花傘, 'flower parasols')
- July 24: Parade of mikoshi to Yasaka Shrine
- July 28: Mikoshi arai, cleansing of mikoshi with sacred water from the Kamo River
- July 31: Closing service at Eki Shrine

== Yamaboko floats ==
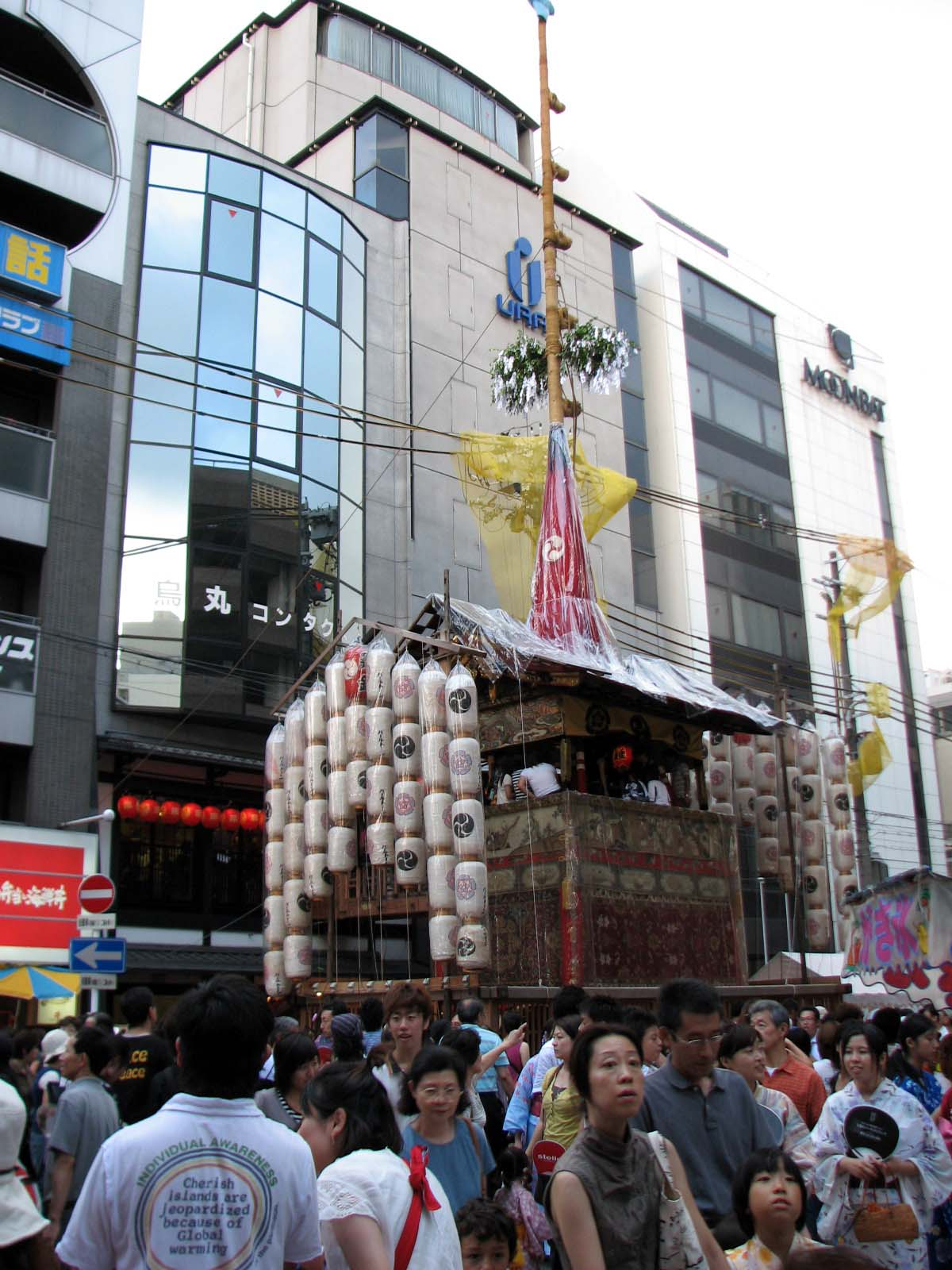
Niwatoriboko float, one of the first to begin the parade. Festival-goers take turns getting on the float through a side building.

The floats in the yoiyama parade are divided into two groups, the larger hoko ("halberd") and the smaller yama ("mountain"), and are collectively called yamaboko. The ten hoko recall the 66 halberds or spears used in the original purification ritual, and the 24 yama carry life-sized figures of Shinto deities, Buddhist bodhisattvas, and other historic and cultural figures. All the floats are decorated with diverse tapestries, some made in Nishijin, Kyoto's traditional textile-weaving district, while others have been imported from all over the world. In fact, thanks to a 1993 survey of the Gion Festival's imported textiles by a team of international textile conservationists and collectors, its unique textile collection is renowned amongst textile professionals worldwide. Musicians sit in the floats playing drums and flutes. The floats are pulled with ropes down the street and good luck favors are thrown from the floats to the crowd. Yamahoko were listed on the Important Intangible Folk Cultural Properties in 1979, and on the Representative List of the Intangible Cultural Heritage of Humanity in 2009.

On the evening of July 17, hundreds of men carry Yasaka Shrine's resident deities around diverse parishioners' neighborhoods in portable mikoshi shrines to the otabisho, a temporary dwelling in central Kyoto. It's believed the deities purify all the neighborhoods along the way. They reside at the otabisho for a week, between the two floats' processions. On the 24th they are taken back to the Yasaka Shrine to their permanent dwelling. On the way back to the shrine, the procession stops at Shinsen-en, the original site of the first rituals in the year 869, the former Imperial garden.

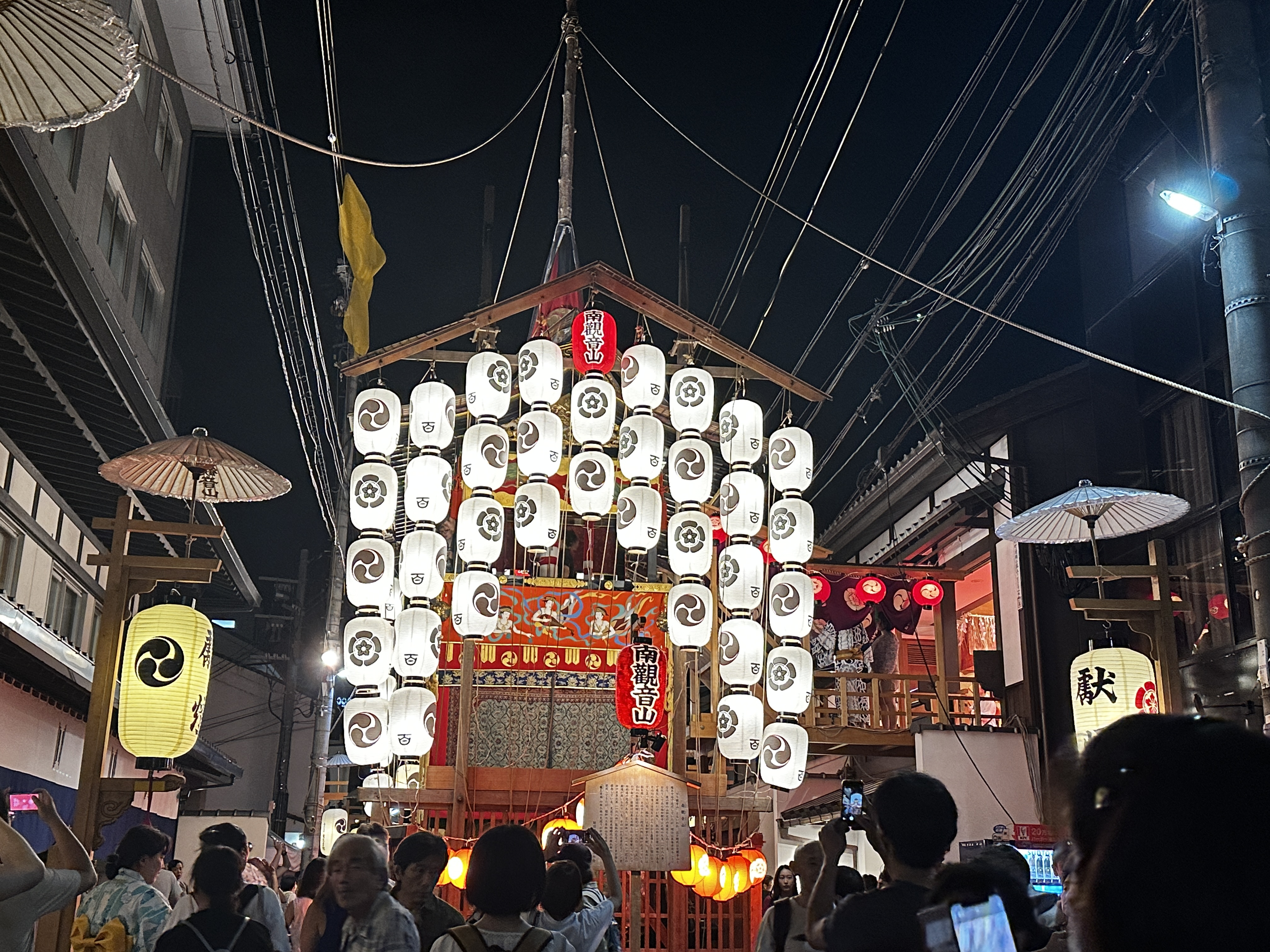
Niwatoriboko float at night

Each year, the neighborhood associations which maintain the floats draw lots in early July. This lottery determines the order in which the floats will appear in the July 17 and 24 processions. These lots are presented in a special ceremony at the commence of the processions, during which the Mayor of Kyoto dons the robes of a magistrate.

The Naginata Hoko depicts a chigo wearing a ceremonial robe and wearing a golden phoenix, chosen as the sacred page of a deity from among merchant houses in Kyoto. After several weeks of special ablution ceremonies, he lives in isolation from the effects of contamination (such as inappropriate food and the presence of women) and is not allowed to touch the ground, so he is placed in a wagon. At the start of the yamahoko on July 17, the chigo cuts the shimenawa with a swing of his sword.

=== Hoko floats ===
- Weight: about 12 tons
- Height: about 27 meters (89 ft)
- Wheel diameter: about 1.9 m (6 ft 3 in)
- Attendants: about 30–40 pulling during procession, usually two men piloting with wedges

=== Yama floats ===
- Weight: 1,200–1,600 kg (2,600–3,500 lb)
- Height: about 6 m (20 ft)
- Attendants: 14–24 people to pull, push or carry

== See also ==
- Gion cult
- Japanese festivals
