= Miyazaki Nichinichi Shinbun =

The Miyazaki Nichinichi Shinbun (宮崎日日新聞), known as the Miyanichi for short, is a daily newspaper that targets Miyazaki Prefecture in the Kyūshū region of Japan.

It was founded on November 25, 1940, as a consolidation of nine daily papers in Miyazaki Prefecture. It began using its current name on 1 January 1961. It provides general news collected from the national and international network of Kyodo News, as well as news from Miyazaki Prefecture. As of 2011, its circulation is 216,302, with 42.9% of Miyazaki households reading the paper, making it the most read newspaper in Miyazaki.
