= The Kyoto Shimbun =

Newspaper published in Kyoto, Japan

- We defend justice. We defend freedom. We defend truth. (Note: われらは正義を守る われらは自由を守る われらは真実を守る, Ware-ra wa seigi o mamoru ware-ra wa jiyū o mamoru ware-ra wa shinjitsu o mamoru)

- Front page of The Kyoto Shimbun on July 18, 2023
- Native name: 京都新聞
- Type: Daily newspaper
- Owner: The Kyoto Shimbun Holdings
- President: Yūji Ōnishi
- Editor-in-chief: Akiko Matsushita
- Founded: June 9, 1879; 147 years ago
- Political alignment: Liberal
- Language: Japanese (print); Japanese, Chinese, English (digital)
- Headquarters: Nakagyo-ku, Kyoto, Japan
- City: Kyoto and Ōtsu
- Country: Japan
- Circulation: As of October 2025: ▼282,091 (morning); ▼65,019 (evening)
- Website: www.kyoto-np.co.jp (Japanese); www.kyoto-np.com/en (English)

The Kyoto Shimbun (Japanese: 京都新聞, Hepburn: Kyōto Shinbun) is a daily newspaper published in Kyoto, Japan, by The Kyoto Shimbun Company under the Kyoto Shimbun Holdings. It is the local newspaper for Kyoto and Shiga prefectures. It is also known in the latter as the Shiga Kyoto Shimbun. In addition to the two prefectures, it also sells some issues of its morning edition in certain parts of Osaka Prefecture.

It was founded in June 1879 as Kyoto Shōji Jinhō. It changed its name several times before becoming the Kyoto Hinode Shimbun. It was merged with Kyoto Nichi Nichi Shimbun to form The Kyoto Shimbun in 1942. It absorbed the Shiga Nichinichi Shimbun in 1979. As of October 2025, the publication produced around 347,000 copies daily across its morning and evening editions.

Described as a liberal-leaning newspaper, it publishes various news about culture, politics, and sports in Kyoto. Alongside print media, it also publishes news on its website, Kyoto Shimbun Digital. (Note: stylized as Kyoto Shimbun DIGITAL)

== History ==
=== 19th century ===
The Kyoto Shimbun was founded on June 9, 1879, as Kyōto Shōji Jinhō (京都商事迅報) by M. Hamaoka. He served as the company president until 1902. It was renamed to just Shōji Jihō (商事迅報) in August of the same year. It was subsequently renamed to Kyoto Shiga Shinpō (京都滋賀新報) in July 1882, and to Chūgai Denpō (中外電報) in October 1884. During this period, it was often censored due to its anti-government commentaries. It ceased publication in 1892.

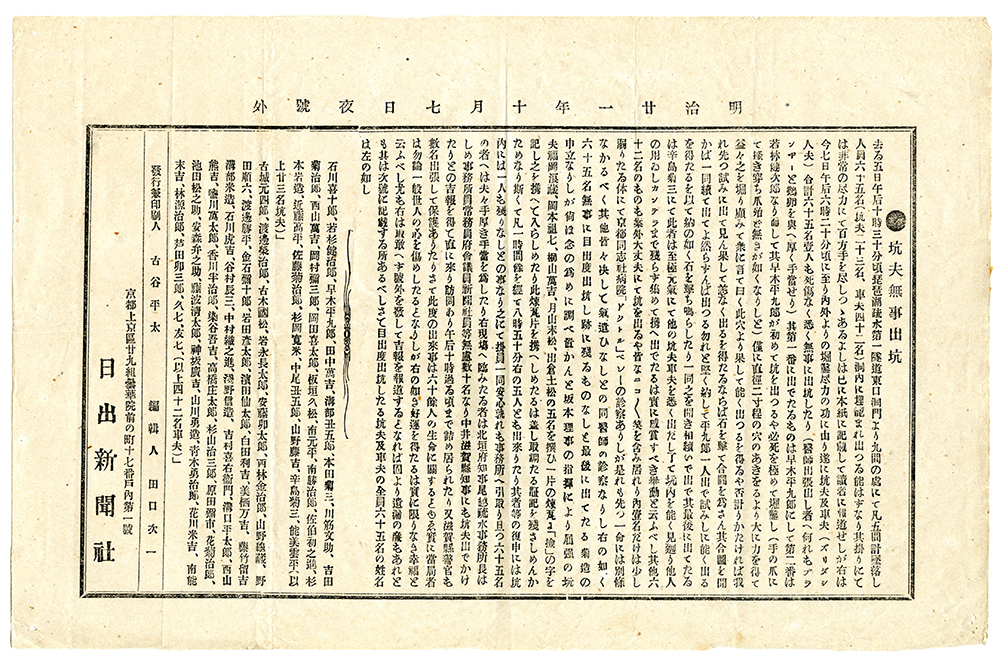
October 7, 1888, issue of the Hinode Shimbun

The Hinode Shimbun (日出新聞), which was founded in April 1885, became the replacement for the defunct Chūgai Denpō. Following the latter's discontinuation, its reporters joined the Hinode Shimbun. Hinode Shimbun carried various reports on Japanese tea culture during the Meiji period. Notable writers included Sazanami Iwaya and Kyōka Izumi. It was renamed Kyoto Hinode Shimbun (京都日出新聞) in July 1897. It is the only newspaper published in Kyoto during the mid-Meiji era to survive beyond the Chūgai Denpō's 1892 demise.

=== 20th century ===
During the Russo-Japanese War in 1904, Kyoto Hinode Shimbun, alongside other newspapers, ran a fundraising campaign. They published articles raising donations for the soldiers and their families, as well as promoting government bonds. Kyoto Hinode Shimbun ran an article titled "Fund raising [sic] to support soldiers and their families" on its front page almost every day, covering the fundraising campaign it organized. It also published daily columns reporting how the war affected Kyoto on its seventh page, which was meant to "inspire nationalism".

Kyoto Nichinichi Shimbun (京都日日新聞), another predecessor of the newspaper, was founded in February 1912 as Kyoto Yūkan Shimbun (京都夕刊新聞). Following the completion of "three great ventures" (三大業, sandaijigyō), which widened the main roads and constructed tramlines in Kyoto, the Gion parade was banned by Kyoto Governor Ōmori Shōichi on June 11, 1912. He dubbed the parade "Private [sic] festival of one city shrine." Organizers of the parade, along with Kyoto Hinode Shimbun, fought back with an anti-ban campaign that published a series of critical pieces by scholars, such as professors at the Imperial University of Kyoto, condemning his decision. Ōmori lifted the ban on the parade after intense pressure from the campaign.

During the Taishō political crisis in February 1913, a riot broke out in Kyoto. The office of Kyoto Hinode Shimbun was attacked by a mob which threw empty glass bottles at the windows of the building. The building was cordoned off by the police, but the barricade was broken down at night. Staff of the newspaper office defended the building by spraying the rioters with water hoses. A staff member, alongside police officers, who were all armed with swords, charged towards the mob. At least 19 men were arrested by the police.

Kyoto Yūkan Shimbun changed its name to Kansai Nichinichi Shimbun (関西日日新聞) in May 1916, and finally to Kyoto Nichinichi Shimbun in October 1920. Kyoto Nichinichi Shimbun was merged with Kobe Shimbun and Osaka Jiji Shimpō to form Santōgōdo Shimbun (三都合同新聞) in August 1931. It was subsequently dissolved in December 1933.

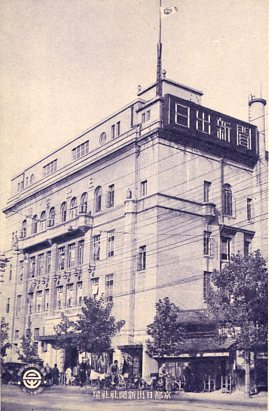
Kyoto Hinode Shimbun Building in 1937

After the passage of the National Mobilization Law in 1938, newspapers across Japan, including the Kyoto Hinode Shimbun and Kyoto Nichinichi Shimbun, were subjected to military censorship. In April 1942, following the wartime "One Prefecture, One Newspaper" consolidation policy of the Empire of Japan, the Kyoto Hinode Shimbun and Kyoto Nichinichi Shimbun merged to form the Kyoto Shimbun. In June 1963, 15 journalists of the Kyoto Shimbun, headed by Kokyo Shiraishi, went to Moscow as delegates. On August 9, Shiraishi received a letter from Soviet Premier Nikita Khrushchev stating his willingness to establish normal relations between the Soviet Union and Japan. In 1979, it absorbed the Shiga Nichinichi Shimbun (滋賀日日新聞), becoming the prefectural newspaper for both Shiga Prefecture and Kyoto Prefecture.

The Kyoto Shimbun signed an agreement in 1994 with the Kobe Shimbun to aid each other in case of emergency. A year later, on January 17, 1995, three hours after the Great Hanshin earthquake struck the Kansai region, Kobe Shimbun telephoned the Kyoto Shimbun for help. They cooperated to continue printing the former's regular 520,000 daily copies, even after its printing office was destroyed. The Kyoto Shimbun Company helped produce negative films for both the four-page evening edition and eight-page morning edition of the Kobe Shimbun. Hideo Yamane, the Kobe Shimbun's top editor, thanked the Kyoto Shimbun, stating in an interview with the Los Angeles Times: "We struggled to find a way and found the ‘holy light’ of the Kyoto Shimbun."

=== 21st century ===
On April 13, 2012, a former shop owner in Ōtsu, Shiga Prefecture, filed a lawsuit against the Kyoto Shimbun. The shop owner alleged that the publication forced him to buy ¥2.75 million (2012) (US$34,465.28) worth of newspapers every month between January 2007 and August 2011, despite low demand leading to the shop's demise. He was seeking ¥100 million (2012) (US$1.25 million) in damages.

The publication released its online edition called Kyoto Shimbun Digital in April 2014. In the same month, The Kyoto Shimbun Company changed its trade name to The Kyoto Shimbun Holdings. It is the first local newspaper company in Japan to become a holding company.

In December 2019, The Kyoto Shimbun's reporting team won the 25th Peace & Cooperation Journalist Fund Awards grand prize for its series of reports regarding the forced sterilization surgeries carried out from 1948 until 1996 under the former Eugenic Protection Law. On August 7, 2020, Toshiyuki Mori, a reporter for The Kyoto Shimbun, filed a lawsuit against Shiga Prefecture seeking to overturn the prefecture's decision to withhold most of the documents related to such forced sterilizations under the former Eugenic Protection Law. In a press conference in Ōtsu, The Kyoto Shimbun stated that "information disclosure is essential to clarify the actual situation." On March 24, 2023, the Ōtsu District Court ordered the disclosure of information such as the age of the person in question and the name of the medical institution that performed the surgery.

On April 20, 2022, it was revealed that Kyoto Shimbun Holdings, the parent company of the newspaper, had been found guilty by a third-party committee of violating Article 120 of the Companies Act for paying over ¥1.6 billion (2022) (US$12.17 million) in compensation to stockholder Hiroko Shiraishi—whose family was involved in the newspaper—in the course of 34 years. Several reporters of the Kyoto Shimbun filed a lawsuit against two former advisors of Kyoto Shimbun Holdings to the Kyoto District Court on June 29, seeking ¥500 million (US$3.16 million) in compensation. In January 2025, the reporters won the lawsuit and were granted ¥500 million in compensation. Shiraishi appealed the ruling. On March 25, 2026, the Osaka District Court reduced the compensation to ¥310 million (US$1.96 million).

On November 14, 2023, The Kyoto Shimbun issued an apology after it was found that five contributed columns written by Professor Masamichi Aihara of Osaka University of Economics published in the evening edition of the newspaper from October 2020 to October 2023 were plagiarized from The Nikkei and other sources.

A serialized column titled "Reason" (理由) by The Kyoto Shimbun about the Kyoto Animation arson attack won the 2024 Nihon Shinbun Kyokai Awards and the 31st Sakata Memorial Journalism Award. On March 1, 2025, it changed the nameplate of the Shiga Prefecture edition to Shiga Kyoto Shimbun (滋賀 京都新聞).

On April 3, 2026, it requested that the AI summary tweet of the publication's polling article about the 2026 Kyoto gubernatorial election, which was held on April 5, go viral on X. The chatbot erroneously tweeted that Satoshi Hamada and incumbent governor Takatoshi Nishiwaki were tied in a poll conducted by the publication, despite the article stating that Nishiwaki was in the lead. On July 8, the book The Newspaper, published by The Kyoto Shimbun Printing and featuring photographs and text about the production and delivery of the newspaper, was a finalist under the Photo and Text category at the Rencontres d'Arles.

== Circulation ==
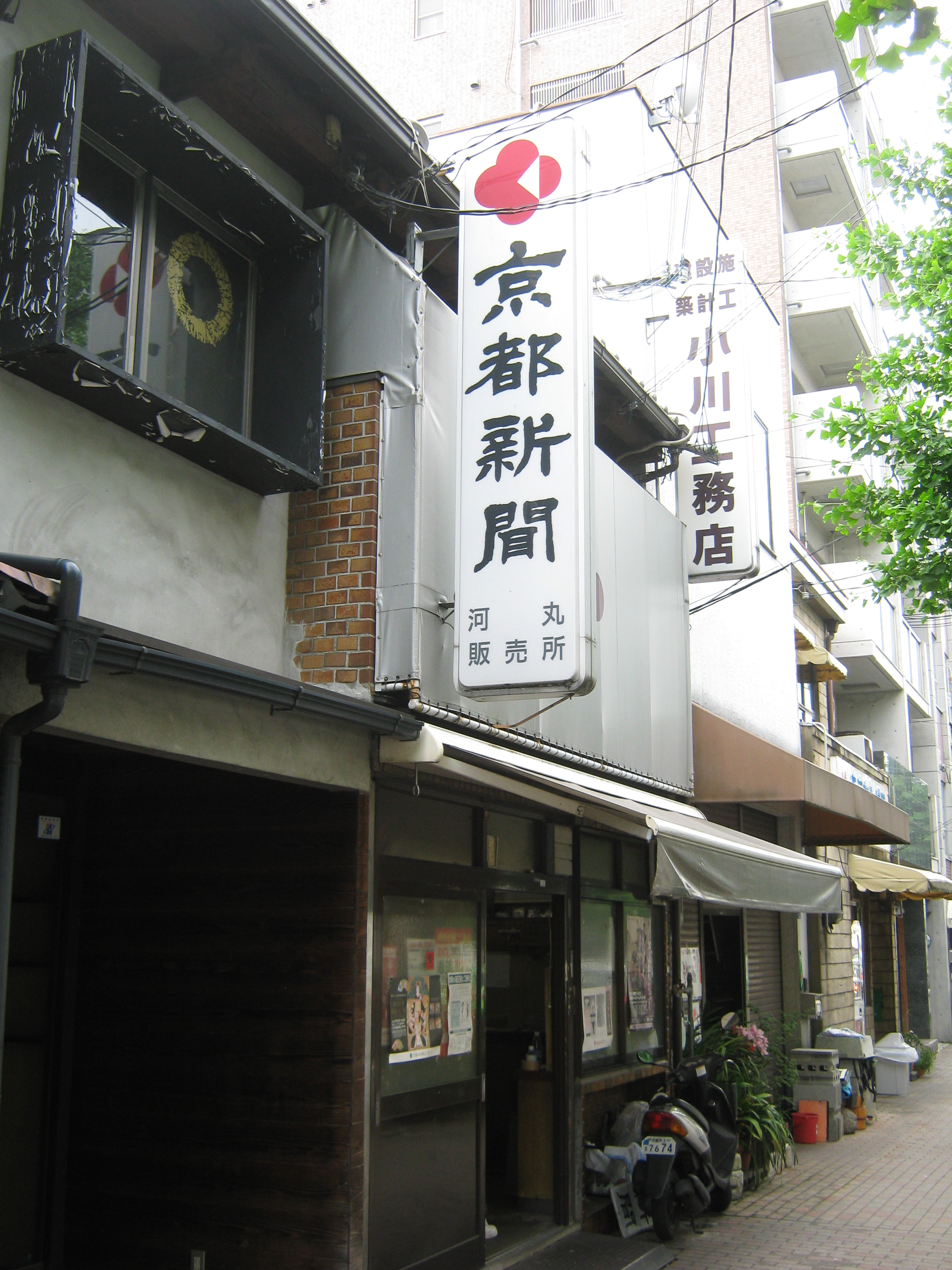
Sales office in Kawamaru, Kamigyō-ku, Kyoto

The newspaper currently publishes two editions each day: the morning issue and the evening issue. According to the Japan Audit Bureau of Circulations, as of October 2025, circulation stood at roughly 282,091 copies for the morning edition and 65,019 copies. In addition to Kyoto and Shiga prefectures, it also sells back issues of its morning edition in certain parts of Osaka Prefecture.

According to the Japan Audit Bureau of Circulations, in October 2025, the Kyoto Shimbun shares roughly 47.1% and 39.3% of the newspaper market in Kyoto Prefecture, selling 231,799 and 62,779 copies for its morning and evening editions, respectively. In Kyoto City, it received shares of 53.1% and 44.9%, selling 134,898 and 44,064 copies for its morning and evening editions, respectively. For Shiga Prefecture, it received a share of 19.9% and 14.0%, selling 50,292 and 2,240 copies for its morning and evening editions, respectively.

In addition to print, the newspaper also publishes news on its website, Kyoto Shimbun Digital, its own mobile app, and through social media such as X. The website has around 300,000 monthly subscribers.

== Editorial stance ==
The editorial position of The Kyoto Shimbun has been described as liberal. Previously, its predecessor, Kyoto Hinode Shimbun, strongly supported chauvinism.

The publication, alongside Mainichi Shimbun, was "serious" about environmental reporting. The Japan Times noted that the publication, alongside Fukui Shimbun, also ran more critical and more comprehensive articles about nuclear power than the national newspapers.

The newspaper's articles have been described as placing a heavy emphasis on 'peace' as its purpose. Following a press conference by then-Prime Minister Shinzo Abe about "collective self-defence" in May 2014, The Kyoto Shimbun published an editorial stating "Military expansion is spreading under the rationale of protecting peace" and urging its readers to "read the Preamble and Article 9 of the Constitution".

The publication is against the use of nuclear weapons and a nuclear arms race, publishing numerous editorials encouraging the Japanese government to join the Treaty on the Prohibition of Nuclear Weapons as an observer. It is also against the proposed revision of the Japanese Constitution citing the importance of Article 12, or "Constant endeavor" (不断の努力), in maintaining "peace and freedom".

== Coverage ==
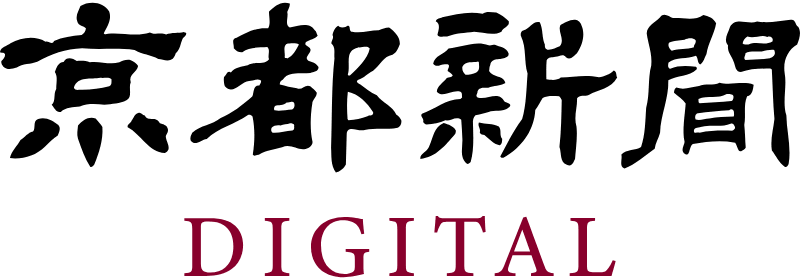
Logo of the Kyoto Shimbun Digital

The Kyoto Shimbun publishes news on politics, culture, and sports. Culture coverage includes the local culture of Kyoto, such as cultural and artistic locations, entertainment, traditional arts, and household issues, while sports coverage includes the reporting of various professional and amateur sports in Japan, such as Kyoto's soccer team, Kyoto Sanga FC. The political coverage includes news about politics, the economy, and local news in Kyoto. It also publishes international news through newswire services such as the Associated Press.

=== Features ===
During the first week of July, The Kyoto Shimbun has dedicated sections of its daily print newspaper to promotions and advertisements of Gion Matsuri, a festival in Kyoto.

On June 9, 2020, "The Kyoto" (stylized in all caps) platform was launched by the Kyoto Shimbun in collaboration with the advertising company Dentsu to disseminate information about the local traditional culture of Kyoto both domestically and internationally via the internet. It also publishes Kyoto Shimbun ON BUSINESS, a business media outlet publishing articles about business-related news, events, and human resources information.

Starting on January 1, 2015, in commemoration of the 70th anniversary of the end of World War II, it published a serialized column entitled "A Boat that Crosses Time" (時を渡る舟), which features the history of the war and aims to highlight "passing the recordings and memories of the war to future generation. [sic]". In addition to the serialized column, it also dedicated a section of its website to publishing video and audio recordings, and other stories from survivors of the war.

From December 8, 2024, to September 2025, the newspaper launched a project called "Kyoto Wartime Newspaper" (京都戦時新聞), where it republished and re-edited wartime articles by The Kyoto Shimbun and its predecessors, Kyoto Hinode Shimbun and Kyoto Nichinichi Shimbun, during the Pacific War published from December 1941 to September 1945 in the Sunday morning edition of its website, Kyoto Shimbun Digital. The project won the Special Award at the 33rd Sakata Memorial Journalism Award in March 2026.

Notable columnist includes: Venetia Stanley-Smith, which is a columnist from 2000 to 2003, along with her husband, Tadashi Kajiyama.

== Company ==
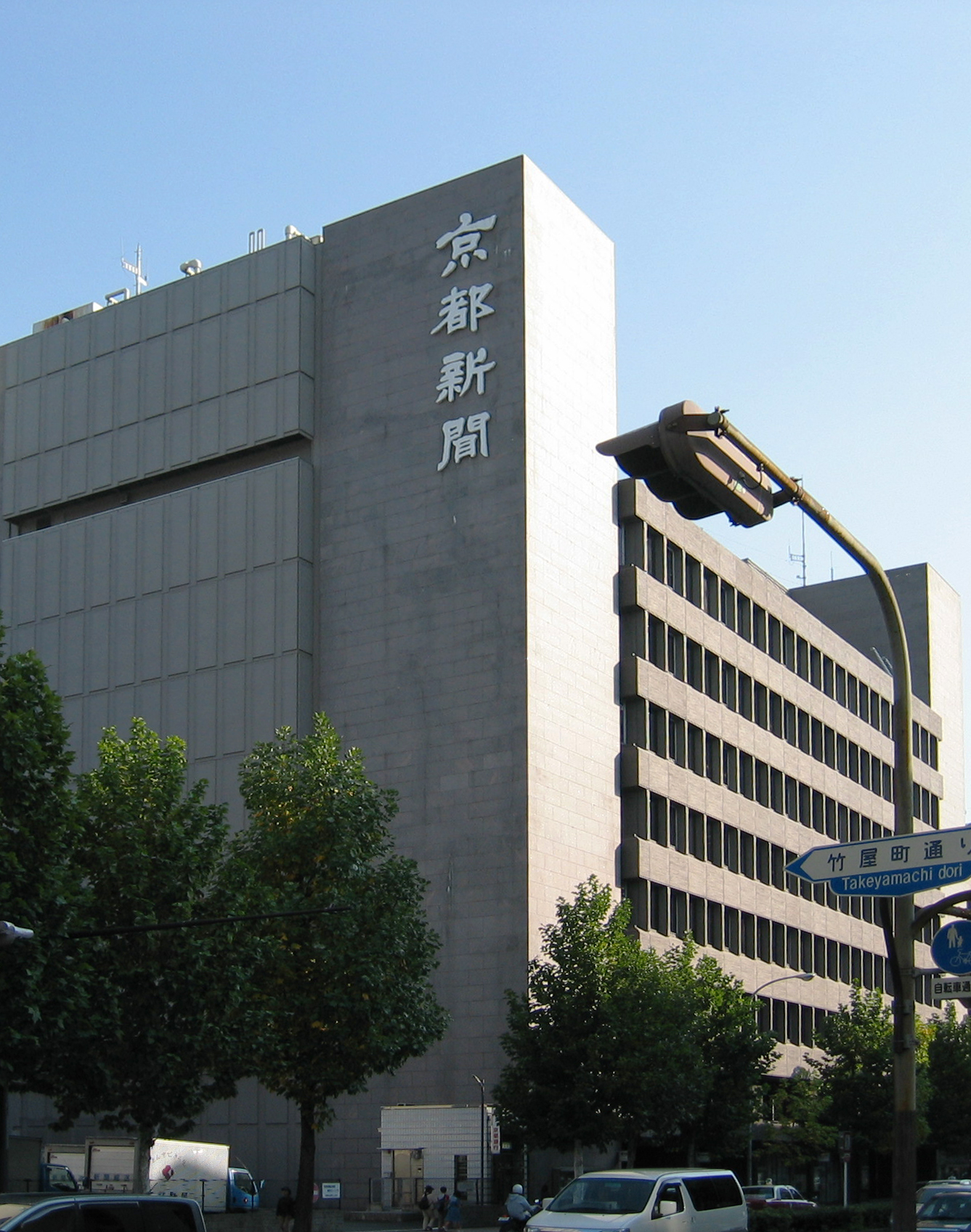
Headquarters in Nakagyō-ku, Kyoto

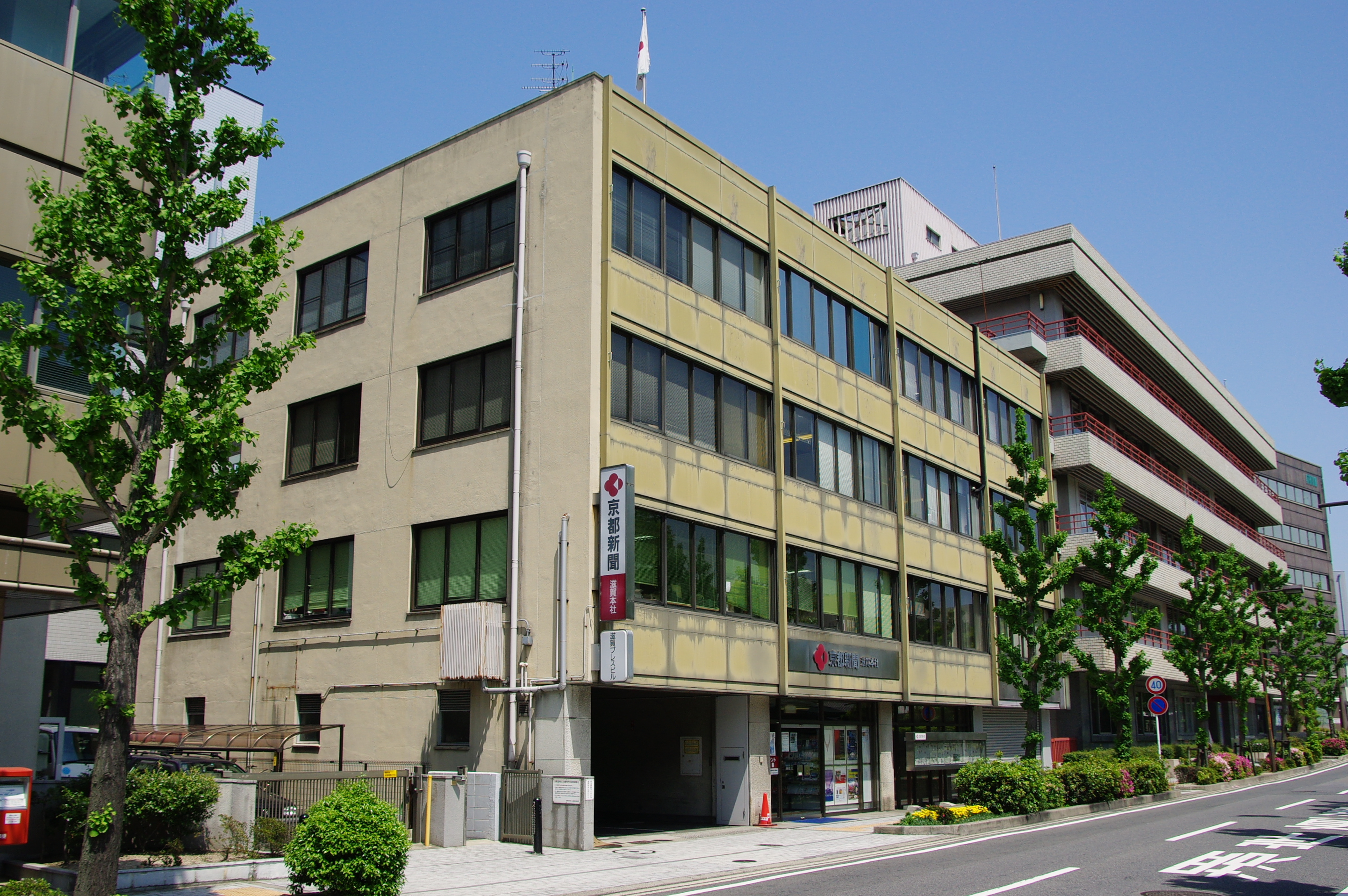
Shiga Prefecture Head Office in Ōtsu

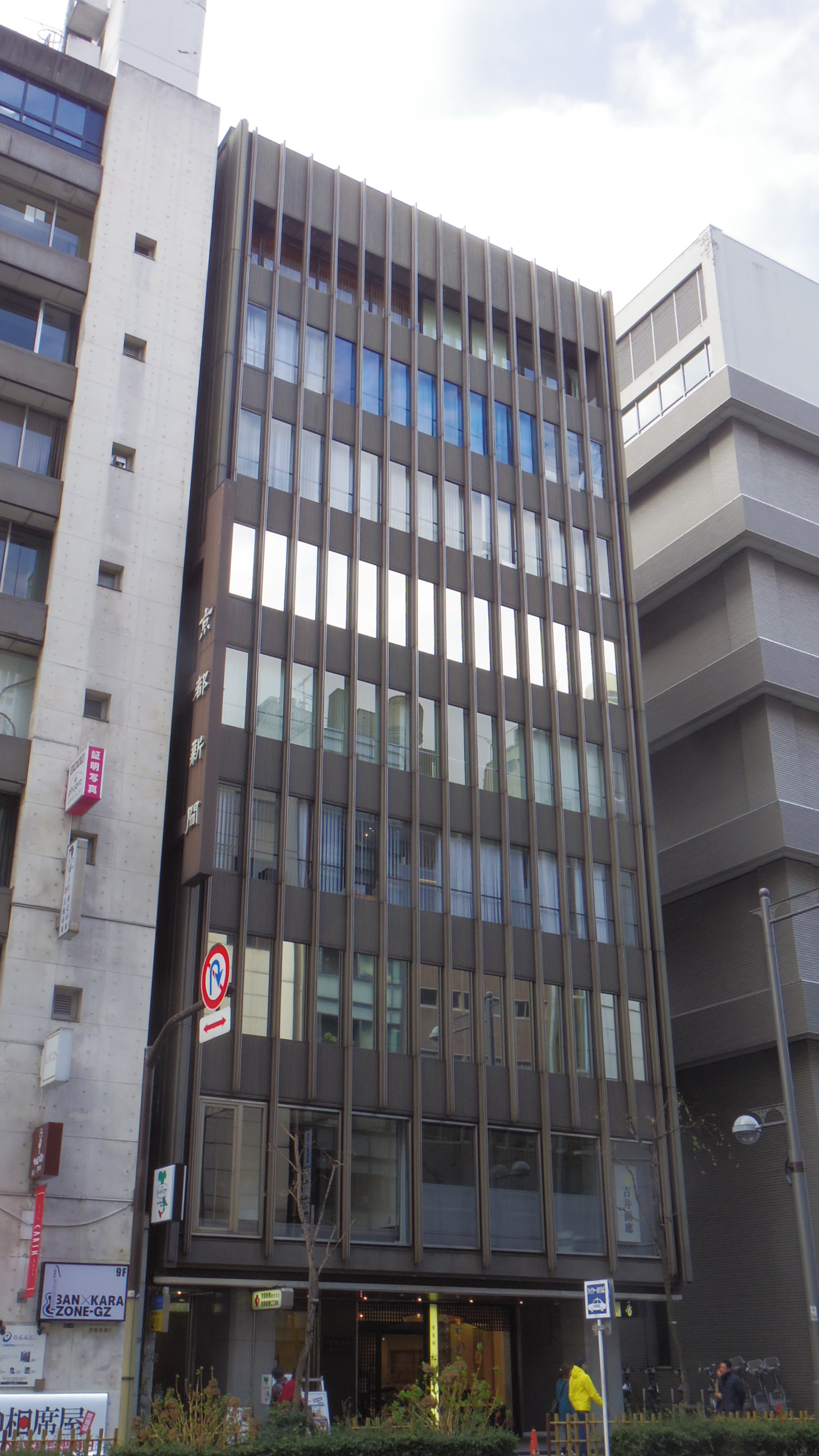
Satellite office in Chiyoda-ku, Tokyo

The company publishing the newspaper is The Kyoto Shimbun Company (株式会社京都新聞社, Kabushiki-gaisha Kyōto Shinbun-sha), which is part of The Kyoto Shimbun Holdings. Other parts of the Holdings include Kyoto Shimbun Printing, which is responsible for printing and shipping, and Kyoto Shimbun COM, which is responsible for sales and advertising.

Its headquarters is located in Nakagyō-ku, Kyoto. The company also has a head office in Ōtsu, Shiga Prefecture and has branch offices throughout Kyoto and Shiga prefectures. It also has a satellite office in Chiyoda-ku, Tokyo. As of June 2025, the current company president is Yūji Ōnishi. Since April 1, 2026, the current editor-in-chief is Akiko Matsushita.

As of fiscal year 2024, the company has a capital stock of ¥100 million (2024) (US$660,649.07) and reported sales of ¥6.3 billion (2024) (US$41.62 million). As of June 2025, the company has 470 employees, 140 of whom are journalists, and 40 are responsible for printing.

The company is one of the shareholders of Press Net Japan Co. Ltd.

== Other ventures ==
Kyoto Shimbun Hai is a Grade 2 flat horse race held at the Kyoto Racecourse with the prize donated by the company. Annually, the newspaper also hosts the Kyoto Shimbun Grand Prize (京都新聞大賞) given to individuals and organizations based in Kyoto and Shiga prefectures that have made significant contributions in various fields. The Kyoto Shimbun Publishing Center (京都新聞出版センター, Kyōto Shinbun Shuppan Sentā), which is part of the Kyoto Shimbun Printing branch of the Holdings, is used by artists to edit, produce, print, publish, and sell their works.

== See also ==
- Sokotsu Samukawa
- Kazuko Saegusa

== Further readings ==
- De Lange, William (2023). A History of Japanese Journalism: State of Affairs and Affairs of State. Toyo Press. ISBN 978-94-92722-393.
- Oh, Joongwon (May 31, 2020). 『京都新聞』在日朝鮮人関連記事目録(1950～1953年) [List of articles about Koreans in Japan appeared in Kyoto Shimbun, 1950-1953]. Social Science Review (Thesis). Vol. 133. The Association of Social Studies, Doshisha University. pp. 197–213. doi:10.14988/pa.2020.0000000197.
