= Higashi-Shinbashi =

Higashi-Shinbashi 東新橋
- District
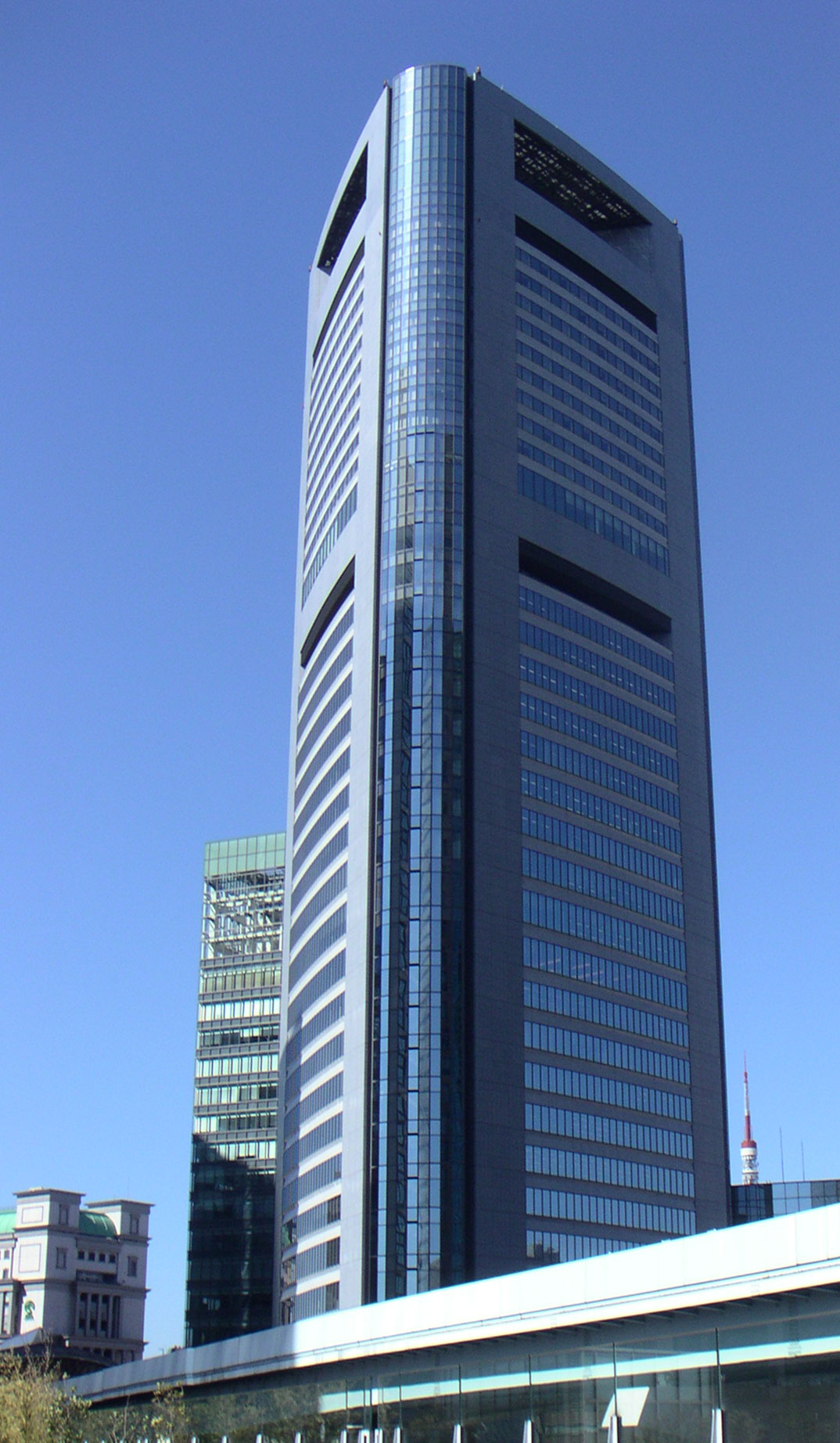
- Shiodome Media Tower
- Interactive map of Higashi-Shinbashi
- Coordinates: 35.6628°N 139.7598°E
- Country: Japan
- City: Tokyo
- Ward: Minato
- Area: Shiba Area

Population (January 1, 2016)
  - Total: 1,796
- Time zone: UTC+9 (JST)
- Postal code: 105-0021
- Area code: 03

Higashi-Shinbashi (東新橋) is a district of Minato, Tokyo, Japan. Shinbashi is a mainly business and entertainment district of central Tokyo, south of Hibiya Park and the Imperial Palace Tokyo.

== Education ==
Minato City Board of Education operates public elementary and junior high schools.

Higashishinbashi 1-2-chōme are zoned to Onarimon Elementary School (御成門小学校) and Onarimon Junior High School (御成門中学校).
