= Kahoku Shimpō =

Japanese daily newspaper

- Front page of Kahoku Shimpō on September 28, 2026
- Type: Daily newspaper
- Format: Broadsheet
- Publisher: Kahoku Shimpo Corporation
- Founded: 1897; 129 years ago
- Political alignment: Center-left; Liberal
- Language: Japanese
- Headquarters: Sendai
- Country: Japan
- Website: www.kahoku.co.jp

Kahoku Shimpō (河北新報) is a daily newspaper which is published in Sendai, Japan. The paper has been in circulation since 1897.

== History and profile ==
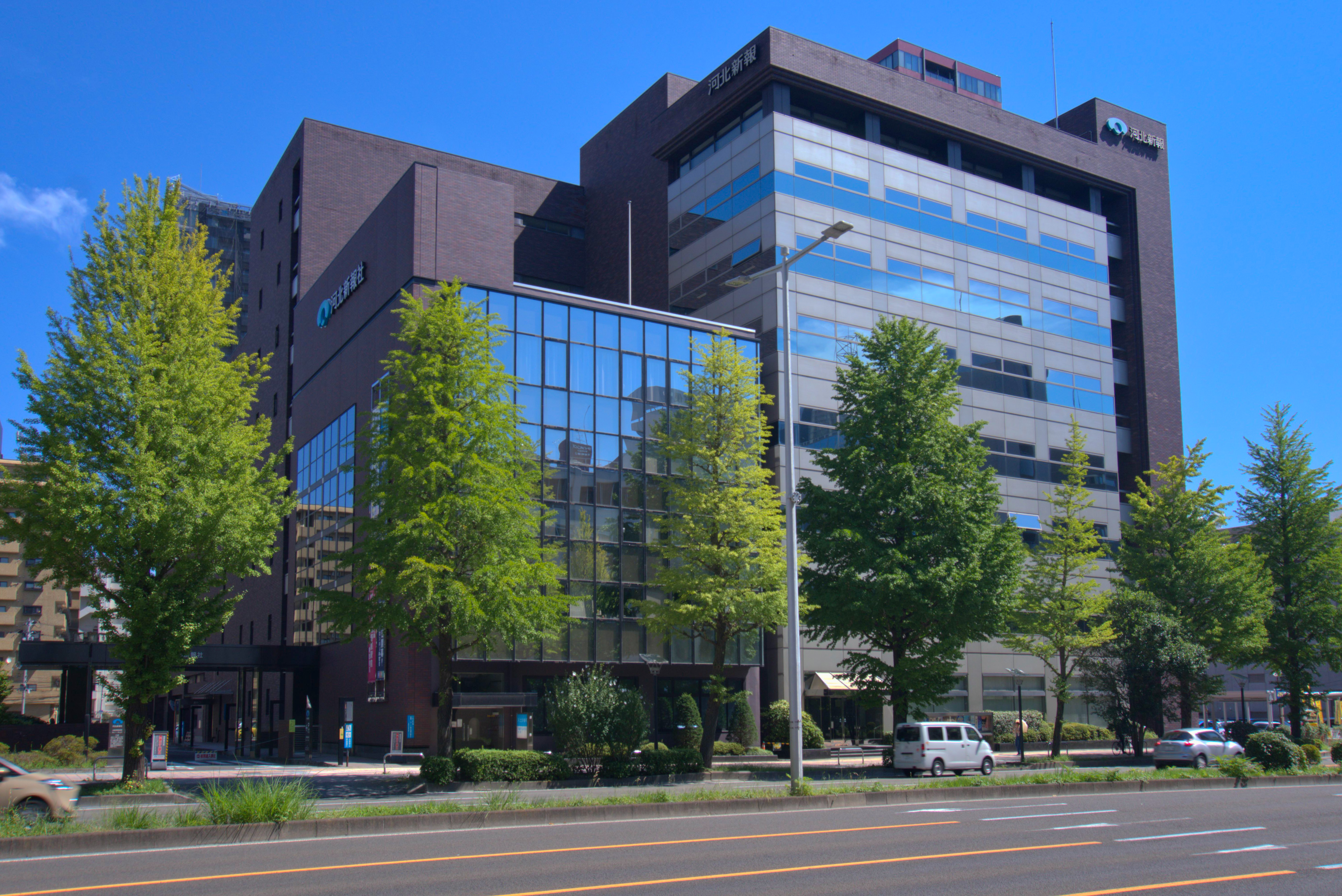
The head office of Kahoku Shimpō

Kahoku Shimpō was established in 1897. It is a local paper based in Sendai, Miyagi Prefecture. The publisher is the Kahoku Shimpo Corporation. As of 2014 Hideya Terashima was the editor of the daily which is published in broadsheet format.

Kahoku Shimpō significantly contributed to the establishment of Tohoku Imperial University in 1907 through its articles on the importance of university education in the region. From October 1945 to January 1947 the paper published Dazai Osamu's novel entitled Pandora no hako (Japanese: Pandora's Box) in sixty-four parts.

Following the 2011 earthquake the editing system of Kahoku Shimpō collapsed and story texts were sent to the Niigata Nippo newspaper.

The 1997 circulation of Kahoku Shimpō which has a liberal political leaning was about 500,000 copies. In 2003 the paper had a circulation of 624,000 copies. The morning edition of the paper had a circulation of 504,911 copies in 2007. The same year the circulation of its evening edition was 107,552 copies.
