= Shiodome Media Tower =

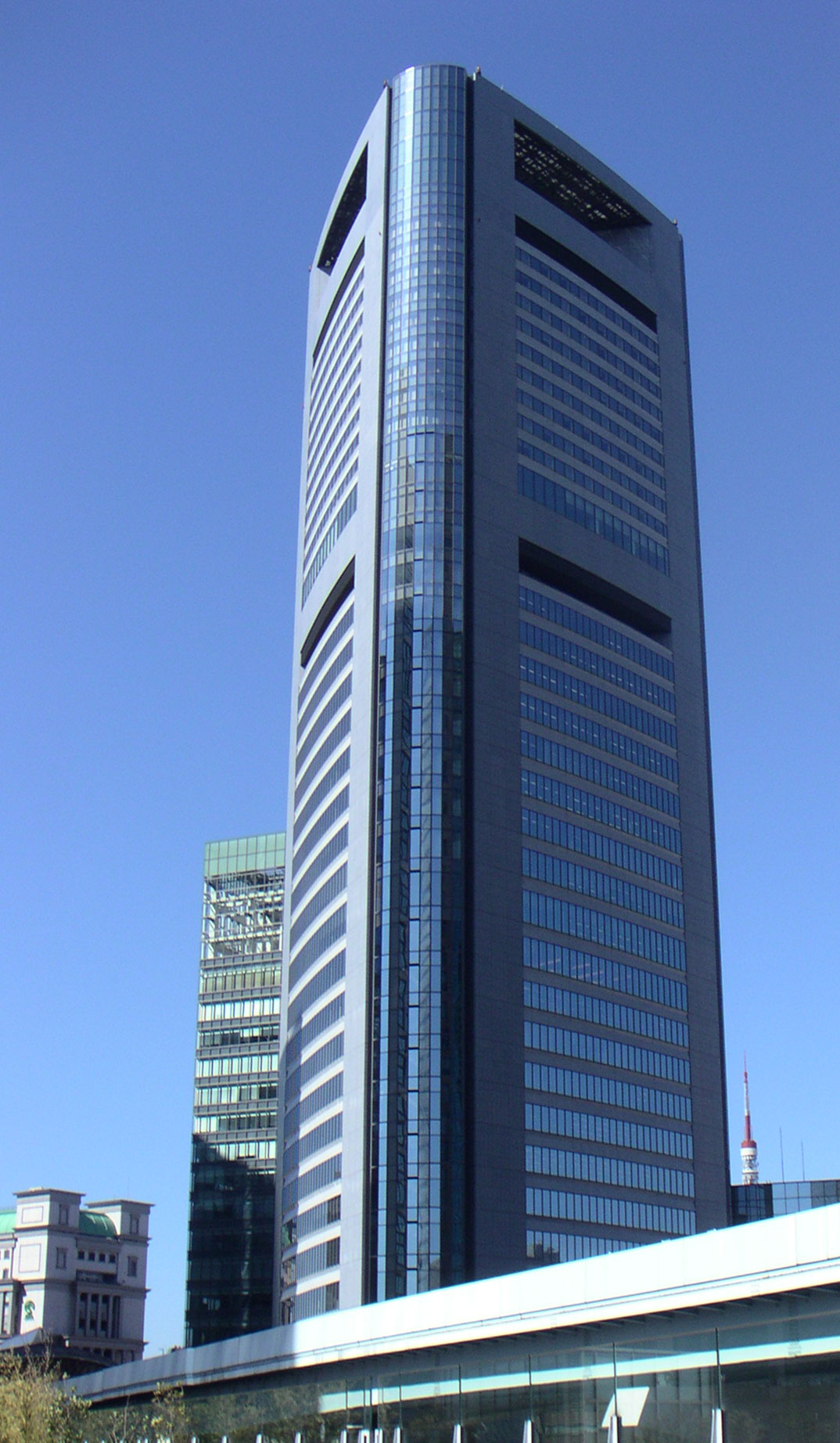

General information
- Type: Office, hotel
- Location: Minato, Tokyo, Japan
- Coordinates: 35.6631°N 139.759°E
- Construction started: 2000
- Completed: 2003
- Opening: 2003

Height
- Roof: 172.6 m (566 ft)

Technical details
- Floor count: 34
- Floor area: 66,489 m^{2} (715,680 sq ft)

Design and construction
- Architect: Seita Morishima
- Developer: Kajima Construction

The Shiodome Media Tower (汐留メディアタワー, Shiodome Media Tawā) is a high-rise building in Shiodome, Tokyo, Japan.

== Size ==
It is 172.6 m (564 ft) high, has 34 floors, and 66,489 m^{2} (710,400 ft^{2}) of floor space.

== History ==
Construction began in 2000, and the building opened in 2003. It was designed by Seita Morishima, and built by Kajima Construction.

== Layout ==
Floors 1–24 are the headquarters of Kyodo News, a nonprofit cooperative news agency. Floors 25–34 is Park Hotel Tokyo, a member of Design Hotels AG. The building features an atrium that begins with the hotel lobby on the building's 25th floor and extends to the 34th floor, providing panoramic views over Tokyo.
