= Kyodo News =

Japanese news agency

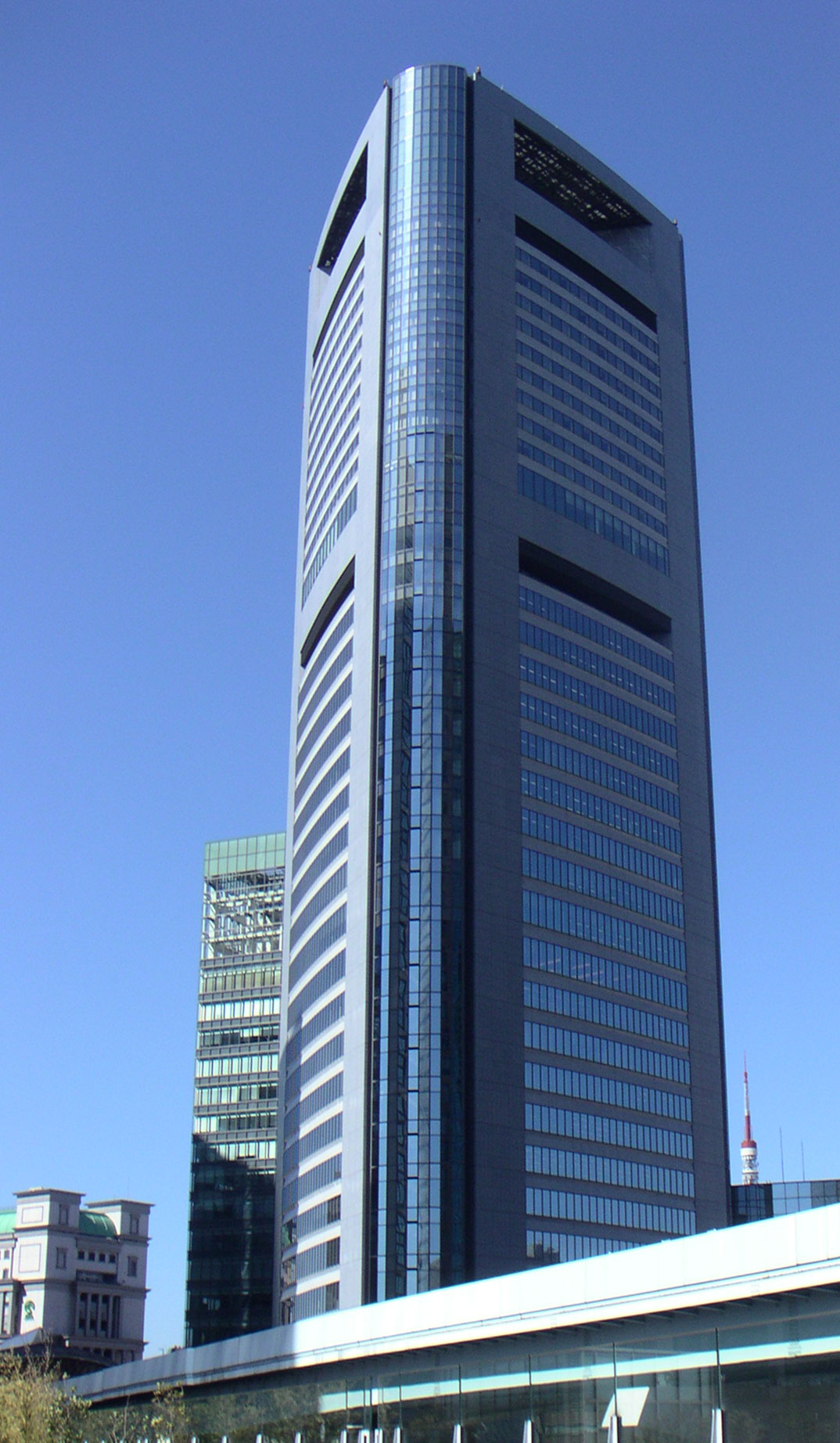
- Shiodome Media Tower, headquarters of Kyodo News in Minato, Tokyo, Japan
- Formerly: Domei News Agency
- Type: Nonprofit cooperative news agency
- Industry: News agency
- Founded: 1945; 81 years ago
- Founder: Furuno Inosuke
- Headquarters: Tokyo, Minato-ku, Higashi-Shimbashi 1-chome No. 7 No. 1
- Area served: Japan and worldwide
- Key people: Toshimitsu Sawai (President)
- Operating income: 40.7 billion yen (Fiscal year ended March 2012)
- Number of employees: 1,621 (as of April 1, 2022)
- Subsidiaries: Kyodo News International
- Website: www.kyodonews.jp

Kyodo News (共同通信社, Kyōdō Tsūshinsha) is a nonprofit cooperative news agency based in Minato, Tokyo. It was established in November 1945 and it distributes news to almost all newspapers, and radio and television networks in Japan. The newspapers using its news have about 50 million subscribers. K. K. Kyodo News is Kyodo News' business arm, established in 1972. The subdivision Kyodo News International, founded in 1982, provides over 200 reports to international news media and is located in Rockefeller Center, New York City.

Their online news site is in Japanese, Chinese (Simplified and Traditional), Korean, and English.

The agency employs over 1,000 journalists and photographers, and maintains news exchange agreements with over 70 international media outlets.

Kyodo News was formed by Furuno Inosuke, the president of the Domei News Agency, following the dissolution of Domei after World War II.

In July 2025, the English language version of the online Kyodo News service was rebranded as Japan Wire by Kyodo News. It had been formerly known as Kyodo News Plus.
