= Revenge on Gold Diggers =

- Developer(s): Front Studio
- Publisher(s): Front Studio
- Director(s): Mark Wu
- Platform(s): Windows, MacOS
- Release: WW: June 19, 2025
- Genre(s): Drama, Romance, Interactive movie
- Mode(s): Single player

Revenge on Gold Diggers (Chinese: 情感反诈模拟器) is a Chinese interactive movie game released on Steam on June 19, 2025. The game was developed and published by Front Studio (前方工作室) and directed by Mark Wu, with Xu Yue, Xu Wei, and Liu Mengru in leading roles.

== Name ==
The original Chinese title of the game was "捞女游戏" ("Gold Diggers Game"), it sparked widespread controversy in Chinese social media due to its perceived sexist overtones. (Note: The Chinese term "捞女" (pinyin: lāo nǚ) specifically refers to female money chaser.) In response to the backlash, the developers quickly renamed the game to "情感反诈模拟器" ("Anti Romance Scam Simulator"). However, its English title, Revenge on Gold Diggers, remains unchanged.

== Plot ==
Player assume the role of a male "Love Hunter" Wu Yulun, who has been hurt by "gold diggers", and aims to infiltrate and counterattack the gold digger organization "Cinderelle" (变凤凰). The game includes 472 minutes of video footage and 38 different endings, also featuring a "Mutual Aid Message Board" for player interaction and exchange of real experiences and strategies against relationship manipulation.

== Cast ==
Character	Actor	Character Description
Wu Yulun	Xu Yue	Emerging fashion company founder, male protagonist
Pan Mengna	Xu Wei	Founder of Cinderelle, entrepreneur, introduced in Chapter 3, appears formally in Chapter 6
Chen Xinxin	Liu Mengru	Cinderelle member, new anchor, model, event organizer, first appears in Chapter 1
Tang Xiaotian	Li Keyi	Famous MCN agent signed internet celebrity, first appears in Chapter 2
Song Shiqi	Yang Yi	Cinderelle member, famous gender blogger, first appears in Chapter 3
He Yueying	Zhao Lei	Cinderelle member, honorary chairman of a commerce association, first appears in Chapter 4
Lin Fang	Chen Huiyan	Anti-gold digger team member, former gold digger, first appears in Chapter 1
Luo Ji		Anti-gold digger team member, bankrupt rich second generation, hacker, first appears in Chapter 1
Uncle Da		Anti-gold digger team member, lawyer, sanda coach, first appears in Chapter 1
Xiao Liu		Employee of emerging fashion brand, former "lick dog (舔狗, A derogatory term for men overly submissive to women)", first appears in Chapter 1

== Influence ==
The game received a 96% positive rate on Steam after its release and ranked fifth on the global bestseller list for a period, topping the Chinese regional sales chart and outselling games like "Black Myth: Wukong".

Extreme Vision News condemned the game for labeling women as gold diggers under the guise of "relationship anti-fraud", deliberately inciting gender conflicts and stigmatizing female groups to harvest toxic attention. The critique was later removed. Beijing Youth Daily and Xinhuanet praised the game as an "innovative anti-fraud tool" and a "medium for spreading civilized marriage and relationship norms", suggesting it helps youths in romance scam prevention and finding true love. Game Grapes and Wang Dan also mentioned that the game has "referential and educational value" though the storyline seems fragmented. They noted that the discussion around the game has calmed down after its release, suggesting that opponents may not be numerous. They also pointed out the severity of the male-female opposition issue reflected by the game's hot discussion.

After the game's launch, the game developer Mark Wu and the official Bilibili account were banned; its Weibo tag was also blocked for unknown reasons. The game developers stated that the social media takedowns were due to "technical issues" and there was no need for excessive concern.
