= Xinhua News Agency =

Chinese state-owned news agency

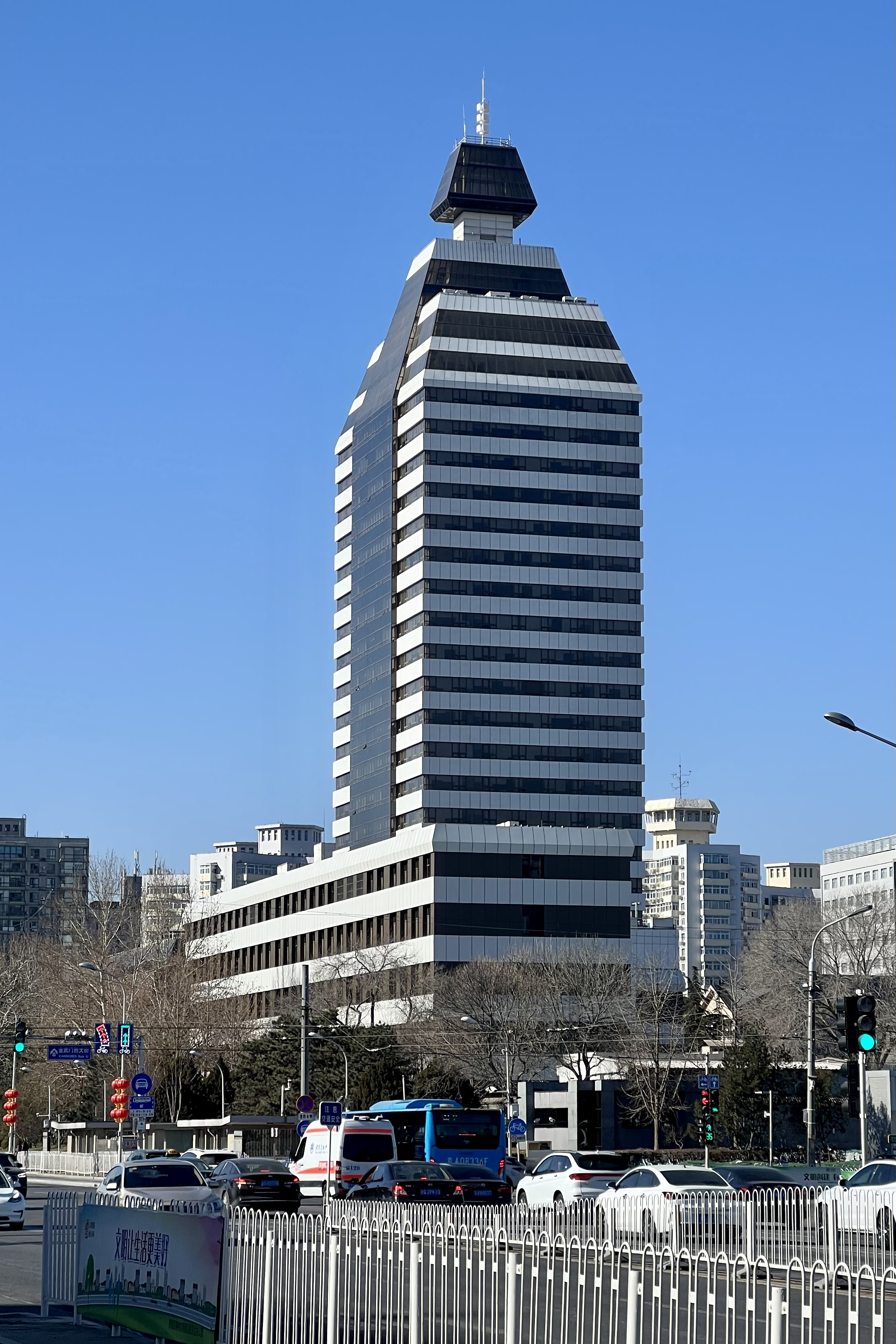
- Xinhua headquarters office in Beijing, its design embodying the shape of a pencil
- Native name

Chinese name
- Simplified Chinese: 新华通讯社
- Traditional Chinese: 新華通訊社
- Literal meaning: New China News Agency
Transcriptions
Standard Mandarin
- Hanyu Pinyin: Xīnhuá Tōngxùnshè
- Wade–Giles: Hsin-hwa Tung-hsün-shê
- IPA: ɕínxwǎ

Abbreviated name
- Simplified Chinese: 新华社
- Traditional Chinese: 新華社
- Literal meaning: New China Agency
Transcriptions
Standard Mandarin
- Hanyu Pinyin: Xīnhuá Shè
- Wade–Giles: Hsin-hwa Shê
- Formerly: Red China News Agency (1931–1937)
- Type: State news agency
- Industry: Broadcast radio and television; online
- Predecessor: Central News Agency (mainland assets)
- Founded: November 1931; 94 years ago, in Ruijin, Jiangxi, Chinese Soviet Republic
- Founder: Chinese Communist Party
- Headquarters: Beijing
- Area served: Worldwide
- Key people: Fu Hua (President and Party Secretary); Lu Yansong (Editor-in-chef and deputy Party Secretary)
- Owner: People's Republic of China (state-owned institution)
- Parent: State Council of China
- Subsidiaries: Xinhuanet; Reference News; China Xinhua News Network Corporation; CNC World
- Website: www.news.cn

Xinhua News Agency (English pronunciation: /ˌʃɪnˈhwɑː/ SHIN-HWA, lit. 'New China'), or New China News Agency, is the official state news agency of the People's Republic of China. It is a ministry-level institution of the State Council. It is the country's largest media outlet.

In November 1931, the Red China News Agency was established by the Chinese Communist Party (CCP) in the Soviet Zone of Ruijin. At the end of the Long March in November 1935, it was renamed to Xinhua. The agency established its first overseas branches during World War II, beginning to broadcast to foreign countries in English in 1944. After Mao Zedong's 1949 proclamation of the People's Republic of China, Xinhua became the official state news agency and subsumed the assets of the Republican era's Central News Agency.

Xinhua is both a publisher and a news agency; it publishes in multiple languages and serves as a channel for distributing information related to the Chinese government and the ruling CCP. Its headquarters in Beijing are located close to the central government's headquarters at Zhongnanhai, and its head, Fu Hua, is a member of the CCP Central Committee. Xinhua tailors its pro-Chinese government message to the nuances of each international audience. The organization has faced criticism for spreading propaganda and disinformation as well as criticizing people, groups, or movements critical of the Chinese government and its policies.

== History ==
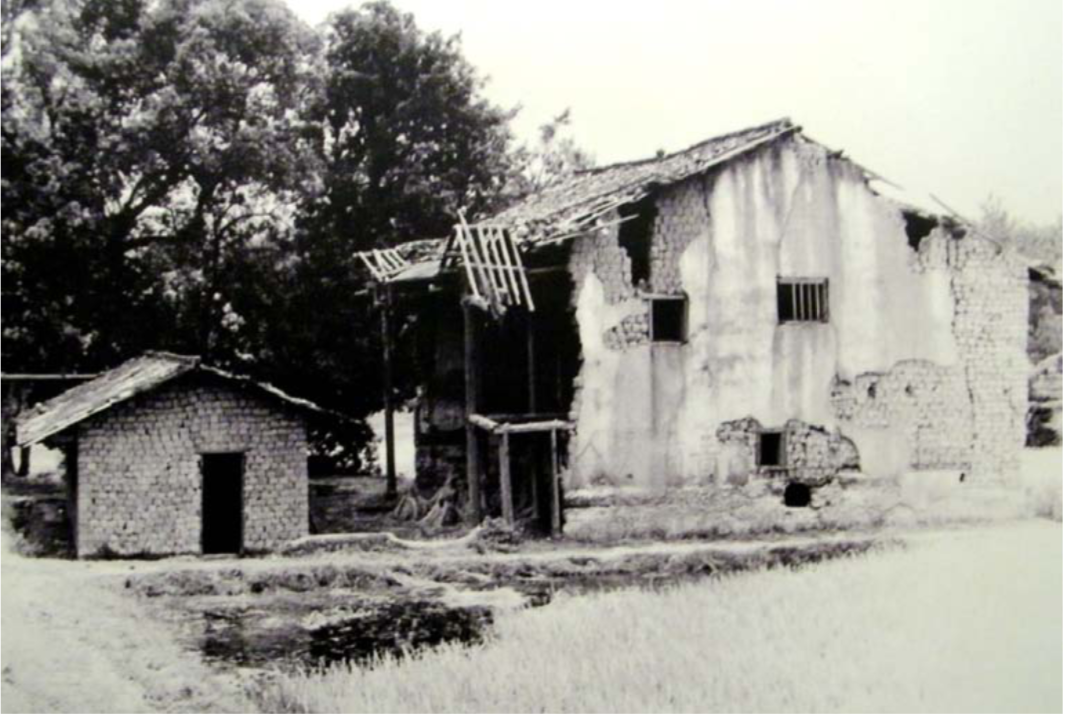
Building of Red China News Agency in 1937

The predecessor to Xinhua was the Red China News Agency (紅色中華通訊社; Hóngsè Zhōnghuá Tōngxùnshè), founded in November 1931 in Communist-controlled Ruijin, Jiangxi Province. It mostly republished news from its rival Central News Agency (CNA) for party and army officials. It was renamed the New China News Agency in November 1935 at the end of the Long March, in which the Chinese Red Army retreated from Jiangxi to Shaanxi. By the outbreak of the Second Sino-Japanese War in 1937, Xinhua's Reference News translated CNA news from the Kuomintang, and also international news from agencies like TASS and Havas. Xinhua first started using letterpress printing in 1940.

During the Pacific War, the agency developed overseas broadcasting capabilities and established its first overseas branches. It began broadcasting to foreign countries in English in 1944. In 1949, Xinhua followed a subscription model instead of its previous limited distribution model. In the direct aftermath of the Chinese Civil War, the agency represented the People's Republic of China in countries and territories with which it had no diplomatic representation, such as British Hong Kong. In 1956, Xinhua began reporting on anti-Marxist and other opinions critical of the CCP. In 1957, Xinhua switched from a journal format to a newspaper format.

The agency was described by media scholars as the "eyes and tongue" of the CCP, observing what is important for the masses and passing on the information. A former Xinhua director, Zheng Tao, noted that the agency was a bridge between the CCP, the government, and the people, communicating both the demands of the people and CCP policies.

In 2018, the United States Department of Justice directed Xinhua's U.S. branch to register as a foreign agent under the Foreign Agents Registration Act. In 2020, the United States Department of State designated Xinhua and other state-owned media outlets as a foreign mission. Xinhua registered in the U.S. as a foreign agent in May 2021.

In June 2022, Fu Hua, a member of the 20th Central Committee of the Chinese Communist Party and former CCP committee secretary of Beijing Daily, was appointed president of Xinhua. In September 2022, Fu stated, "Xinhua will never depart from the party line, not even for a minute, nor stray from the path laid down by General Secretary Xi Jinping".

== Reach ==
By 2021, Xinhua had 181 bureaus globally, publishing news in multiple languages. Xinhua is also responsible for handling, and in some cases, censoring reports from foreign media destined for release in China. Xinhuanet is a publicly traded state-owned enterprise controlled by Xinhua News Agency, originally established as the agency's website. In 2010, Xinhua acquired prime commercial real estate on Times Square in Manhattan and started an English-language satellite news network. In 2017, Xinhua founded China Fortune Media Group to expand its reach. Xinhua has paid other media outlets such as The New York Times, The Washington Post, and The Wall Street Journal to carry its advertorial inserts, branded as "China Watch" or "China Focus".

=== Internal media ===
The CCP's internal media system, in which certain reports (called neican and often translated as "Internal Reference") are published exclusively for government and party officials, provides information and analysis which are not available to the public. Xinhua produces reports for these internal journals that contain information that the CCP considers too sensitive for public consumption and can pertain to subjects for security and intelligence purposes. Xinhua has produced neican for CCP officials at the prefectural level and above.

Xinhua maintains a traditional intelligence gathering function and its reporters file certain internal reports to the CCP leadership from secure rooms in some Chinese embassies. Informed observers note that journalists generally like to write for the internal publications because they can write less polemical and more comprehensive stories without making the omissions of unwelcome details commonly made in the media directed to the general public. The internal reports, written from a large number of countries, typically consist of in-depth analyses of international situations and domestic attitudes towards regional issues and perceptions of China.

The Chinese government's internal media publication system follows a strict hierarchical pattern designed to facilitate party control. A publication called Reference News—which includes translated articles from abroad as well as news and commentary by Xinhua reporters—is delivered by Xinhua personnel, rather than by the national mail system, to officials at the working level and above. Reports called Internal Reference (Neibu Cankao) is distributed to officials at the ministerial level and higher. One example was the first reports on the SARS outbreak by Xinhua which only government officials were allowed to see. The most classified Xinhua internal reports are issued to the top dozen or so party and government officials.

=== Headquarters and regional offices ===
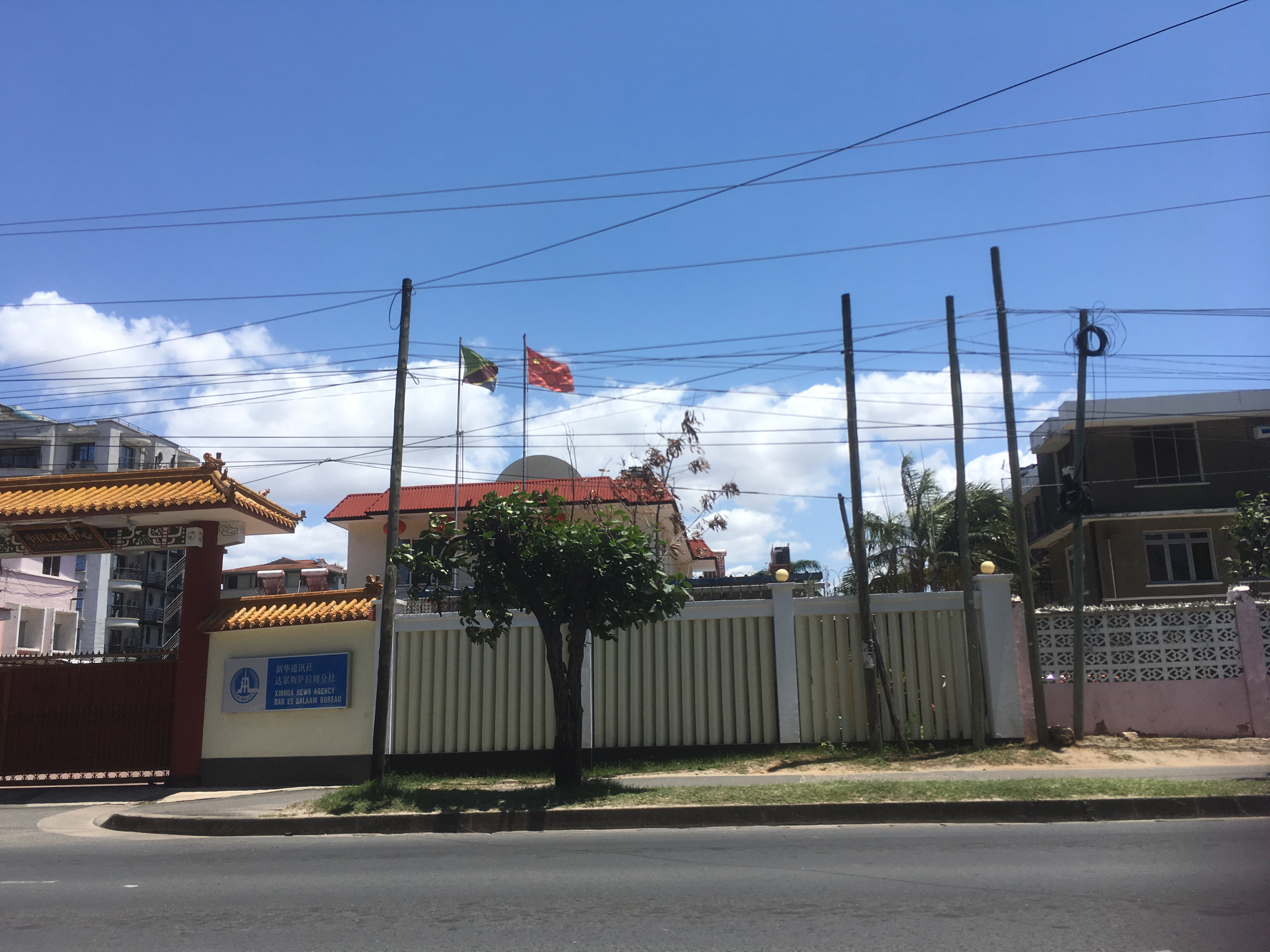
Bureau in Dar es Salaam, Tanzania

Xinhua headquarters is located in Beijing, strategically located near Zhongnanhai, which houses the headquarters of the CCP, the General Secretary, and the State Council. Xinhua established its first overseas affiliate in 1947 in London, with Samuel Chinque as publisher. It distributes its news from the publication's overseas headquarters in New York City, in conjunction with distributing coverage from the United Nations bureau, as well as its other hubs in Asia, Middle East, Latin America, and Africa.

As of 2024, Xinhua has over 170 overseas bureaus.

==== Hong Kong ====
Xinhua's branch in Hong Kong was not just a press office, but served as the de facto embassy of the PRC in the territory when it was under British administration. It was named a news agency under the special historic conditions before the 1997 handover, because the People's Republic did not recognize British sovereignty over the colony, and could not set up a consulate on what it considered to be its soil. In the early 1980s, the deputy secretary of Xinhua, Wong Man-fong, negotiated with Hong Kong-based triads on behalf of the Chinese government to ensure their peace after the handover of Hong Kong.

Despite its unofficial status, the directors of the Xinhua Hong Kong Branch included high-ranking former diplomats such as Zhou Nan, former Ambassador to the United Nations and Vice-Minister of Foreign Affairs, who later negotiated the Sino-British Joint Declaration on the future of Hong Kong. His predecessor, Xu Jiatun, was also vice-chairman of the Hong Kong Basic Law Drafting Committee, before fleeing to the United States in response to the 1989 Tiananmen Square protests and massacre, where he went into exile.

It was authorized by the special administrative region government to continue to represent the central government after 1997, and it was renamed "The Liaison Office of the Central People's Government in the Hong Kong SAR" on 18 January 2000, retaining branch chief Jiang Enzhu as inaugural director.

==== Cairo ====
Xinhua opened its Middle East Regional Bureau in Cairo, Egypt in 1985.

==== In Portuguese ====
Xinhua has a department in Portuguese since 2004. In 2016, they had 14 employees and launched a new portal.

=== Cooperation with other media outlets ===
In 2015, Xinhua and other Chinese state media outlets signed cooperation and content-sharing agreements with Russian state media outlets.

In November 2018, Xinhua News Agency and the Associated Press (AP) of the United States signed a memorandum of understanding to expand cooperation. Some lawmakers in the U.S. Congress asked the AP to release the text of its memorandum of understanding with Xinhua. In response, AP spokeswoman Lauren Easton told The Washington Post that AP's agreement with Xinhua is to allow it to operate inside China and has no bearing on AP's independence, and that Xinhua has no access to AP's sensitive information and no influence over AP's editorial decisions.

In December 2022, journalist Joshua Kurlantzick wrote that Xinhua has had more success than other Chinese state media outlets such as China Global Television Network and China Radio International in acting as a part of China's media offensive, with Xinhua having signed content sharing agreements with many news agencies around the world. He noted that "unlike with, say, a television station that a viewer has to actively turn on, and probably knows the channel, most print or online readers do not check the bylines of news articles—making it easier for Xinhua copy to slip through to readers." He also noted: "In developing countries, Xinhua is increasingly stepping into the void left by other news wires like the Associated Press, because Xinhua content is free or cheap", and was concerned about Xinhua content being used by local news outlets in countries such as Thailand, saying: "Readers don't really notice where it comes from. That's going to skew the views of the general reading public, and that's quite dangerous."

=== Partnerships ===
In 2018, Xinhua, in partnership with Tencent's subsidiary Sogou, launched its first artificial intelligence-generated news anchor.

Xinhua has more than 3,600 content-sharing agreements with media agencies around the world, primarily in developing countries.

== Organization ==
The Xinhua News Agency has the following organizations:

=== Internal organization ===
- General Office
- Editorial Office
- Domestic News Editorial Department
- International News Editorial Department
- Foreign News Editorial Department
- News Photography Editorial Department
- Reference Newsroom
- Sports News Editorial Department
- General Manager's Office
- Communications Technology Bureau
- Personnel Bureau
- Foreign Affairs Bureau
- Planning and Finance Administration
- Retired Cadres Affairs Bureau
- Party Committee

=== Directly affiliated institutions ===
- Audio and Video News Editorial Department
- News Information Center
- Xinhua News Agency Research Institute
- Reference News
- Xinhua Daily Telegraph
- Outlook Weekly
- Banyuetan
- New Media Center
- Agency Management Service Center

=== Directly affiliated enterprise units ===
- Xinhua News Agency Investment Holdings Co., Ltd.
- China Economic Information Service Co., Ltd.
- Xinhuanet Co., Ltd.
- Xinhua News Agency Printing Co., Ltd.
- China Photo Agency Co., Ltd.
- China News Development Shenzhen Co., Ltd.
- China Fortune Media Group Co., Ltd.
- China Securities Journal Co., Ltd.
- Shanghai Securities News Co., Ltd.
- Economic Information Daily Co., Ltd.
- Xinhua Publishing House Co., Ltd.
- China Advertising United Co., Ltd.
- China Financial Information Center (Shanghai) Co., Ltd.
- China Search Information Technology Co., Ltd.
- Xinhua Convergence Media Technology Development (Beijing) Co., Ltd.
- IFC Tower Development Co., Ltd.

=== Dispatched agencies ===
==== Domestic branches ====
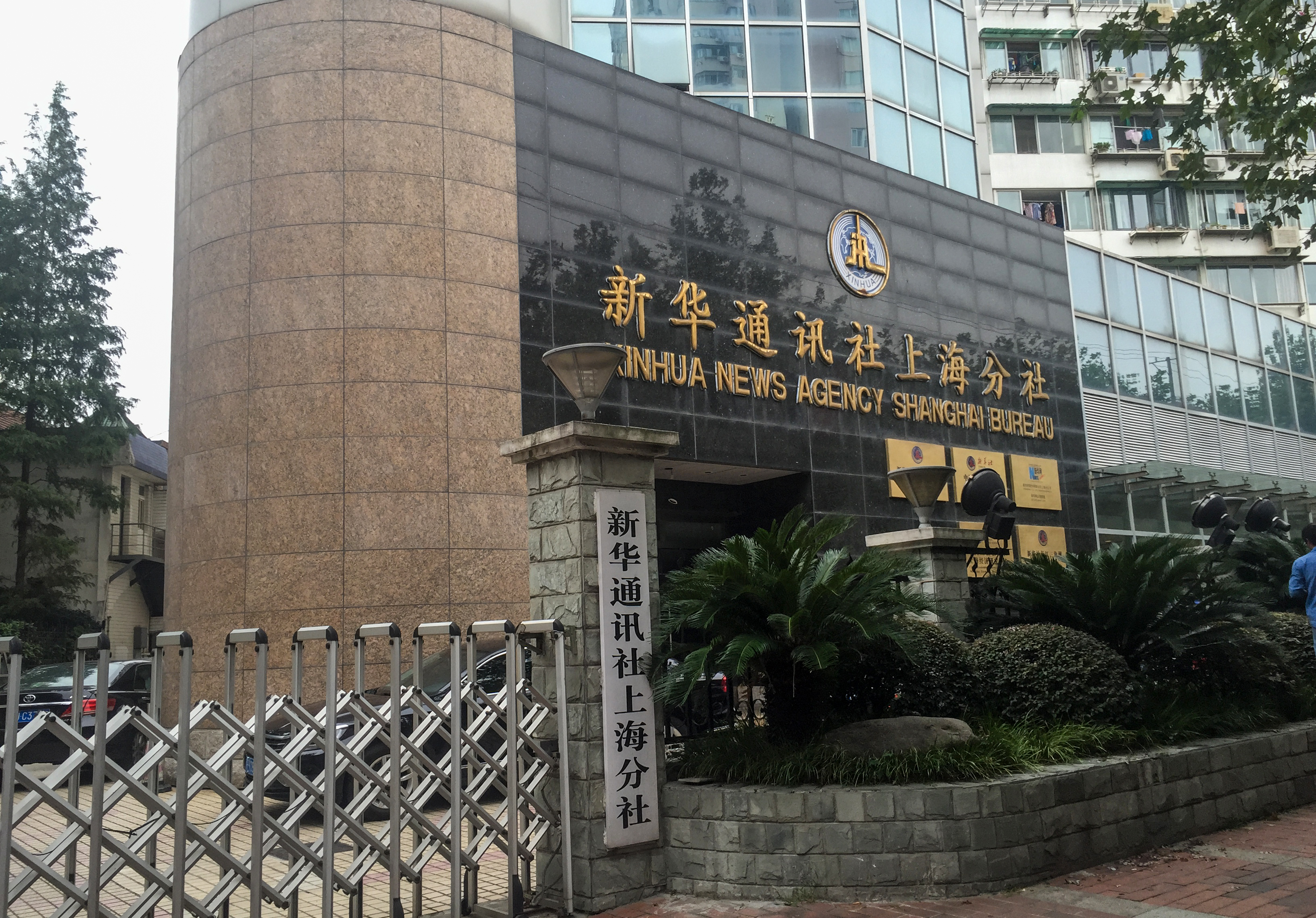
Xinhua News Agency Shanghai Branch on Hengshan Road

- Xinhua News Agency Beijing Branch
- Xinhua News Agency Tianjin Branch
- Xinhua News Agency Hebei Branch
- Xinhua News Agency Henan Branch
- Xinhua News Agency Shanxi Branch
- Xinhua News Agency Shandong Branch
- Xinhua News Agency Liaoning Branch
- Xinhua News Agency Jilin Branch
- Xinhua News Agency Heilongjiang Branch
- Xinhua News Agency Shanghai Branch
- Xinhua News Agency Jiangsu Branch
- Xinhua News Agency Anhui Branch
- Xinhua News Agency Zhejiang Branch
- Xinhua News Agency Jiangxi Branch
- Xinhua News Agency Fujian Branch
- Xinhua News Agency Guangdong Branch
- Xinhua News Agency Guangxi Branch
- Xinhua News Agency Hainan Branch
- Xinhua News Agency Hubei Branch
- Xinhua News Agency Hunan Branch
- Xinhua News Agency Chongqing Branch
- Xinhua News Agency Sichuan Branch
- Xinhua News Agency Xinjiang Branch
- Xinhua News Agency Ningxia Branch
- Xinhua News Agency Qinghai Branch
- Xinhua News Agency Shaanxi Branch
- Xinhua News Agency Gansu Branch
- Xinhua News Agency Yunnan Branch
- Xinhua News Agency Guizhou Branch
- Xinhua News Agency Tibet Branch
- Xinhua News Agency Inner Mongolia Branch
- Xinhua News Agency PLA Branch

Reporter stations

- Xinhua News Agency Dalian Branch
- Xinhua News Agency Ningbo Branch
- Xinhua News Agency Xiamen Branch
- Xinhua News Agency Qingdao Branch
- Xinhua News Agency Shenzhen Branch
- Xinhua News Agency Nanhai News Agency (stationed in Sanya, Hainan)
- Xinhua News Agency Eastern Tibet Reporter Station (stationed in Qamdo, Tibet)
- Xinhua News Agency Xinjiang Production and Construction Corps Branch (stationed in Urumqi, Xinjiang)
- Xinhua News Agency Yili News Agency
- Xinhua News Agency Southern Xinjiang Reporter Station

==== Overseas branches ====
===== Asia Pacific =====
Xinhua News Agency Asia Pacific Headquarters (Hong Kong)

- Xinhua News Agency Hong Kong Branch - Hong Kong Special Administrative Region
- Xinhua News Agency Macao Branch - Macau Special Administrative Region
- Xinhua News Agency Tokyo Branch - Japan
- Xinhua News Agency Osaka Branch - Japan
- Xinhua News Agency Fukuoka Branch - Japan
- Xinhua News Agency New Delhi Branch - India
- Xinhua News Agency Mumbai Branch - India
- Xinhua News Agency Kolkata Branch - India
- Xinhua News Agency Kabul Branch - Afghanistan
- Xinhua News Agency Canberra Branch - Australia
- Xinhua News Agency Melbourne Branch - Australia
- Xinhua News Agency Islamabad Branch - Pakistan
- Xinhua News Agency Pyongyang Branch - North Korea
- Xinhua News Agency Dili Branch - East Timor
- Xinhua News Agency Suva Branch - Fiji
- Xinhua News Agency Manila Branch - Philippines
- Xinhua News Agency Seoul Branch - South Korea
- Xinhua News Agency Phnom Penh Branch - Cambodia
- Xinhua News Agency Vientiane Branch - Laos
- Xinhua News Agency Male Branch - Maldives
- Xinhua News Agency Kuala Lumpur Branch - Malaysia
- Xinhua News Agency Dhaka Branch - Bangladesh
- Xinhua News Agency Yangon Branch - Myanmar
- Xinhua News Agency Kathmandu Branch - Nepal
- Xinhua News Agency Colombo Branch - Sri Lanka
- Xinhua News Agency Bangkok Branch - Thailand
- Xinhua News Agency Bandar Seri Begawan Branch - Brunei
- Xinhua News Agency Singapore Branch - Singapore
- Xinhua News Agency Wellington Branch - New Zealand
- Xinhua News Agency Jakarta Branch - Indonesia
- Xinhua News Agency Hanoi Branch - Vietnam
- Xinhua News Agency Ho Chi Minh City Branch - Vietnam

===== Middle East =====
Xinhua News Agency Middle East Branch (Cairo, Egypt)

- Xinhua News Agency Algiers Branch - Algeria
- Xinhua News Agency Abu Dhabi Branch - United Arab Emirates
- Xinhua News Agency Dubai Branch - United Arab Emirates
- Xinhua News Agency Muscat Branch - Oman
- Xinhua News Agency Cairo Branch - Egypt
- Xinhua News Agency Gaza Branch - Palestine
- Xinhua News Agency Manama Branch - Bahrain
- Xinhua News Agency Doha Branch - Qatar
- Xinhua News Agency Kuwait Branch - Kuwait
- Xinhua News Agency Beirut Branch - Lebanon
- Xinhua News Agency Tripoli Branch - Libya
- Xinhua News Agency Rabat Branch - Morocco
- Xinhua News Agency Riyadh Branch - Saudi Arabia
- Xinhua News Agency Khartoum Branch - Sudan
- Xinhua News Agency Ankara Branch - Turkey
- Xinhua News Agency Istanbul Branch - Turkey
- Xinhua News Agency Tunisia Branch - Tunisia
- Xinhua News Agency Damascus Branch - Syria
- Xinhua News Agency Sana'a Branch - Yemen
- Xinhua News Agency Baghdad Branch - Iraq
- Xinhua News Agency Tehran Branch - Iran
- Xinhua News Agency Jerusalem Branch - Israel
- Xinhua News Agency Amman Branch - Jordan

===== Latin America =====
Xinhua News Agency Latin America Headquarters (Mexico City, Mexico)

- Xinhua News Agency Buenos Aires Branch - Argentina
- Xinhua News Agency Asuncion Branch - Paraguay
- Xinhua News Agency Panama City Branch - Panama
- Xinhua News Agency Rio de Janeiro Branch - Brazil
- Xinhua News Agency Brasilia Branch - Brazil
- Xinhua News Agency Sao Paulo Branch - Brazil
- Xinhua News Agency Lima Branch - Peru
- Xinhua News Agency La Paz Branch - Bolivia
- Xinhua News Agency Santo Domingo Branch - Dominican Republic
- Xinhua News Agency Quito Branch - Ecuador
- Xinhua News Agency Bogota Branch - Colombia
- Xinhua News Agency San Jose Branch - Costa Rica
- Xinhua News Agency Havana Branch - Cuba
- Xinhua News Agency Tegucigalpa Branch - Honduras
- Xinhua News Agency Mexico City Branch - Mexico
- Xinhua News Agency Managua Branch - Nicaragua
- Xinhua News Agency Paramaribo Branch - Suriname
- Xinhua News Agency Port of Spain Branch - Trinidad and Tobago
- Xinhua News Agency Caracas Branch - Venezuela
- Xinhua News Agency Montevideo Branch - Uruguay
- Xinhua News Agency Kingston Asia Branch - Jamaica
- Xinhua News Agency Santiago Branch - Chile

===== Africa =====
Xinhua News Agency Africa Headquarters (Nairobi, Kenya)

- Xinhua News Agency Addis Ababa Branch - Ethiopia
- Xinhua News Agency Luanda Branch - Angola
- Xinhua News Agency Cotonou Branch - Benin
- Xinhua News Agency Gaborone Branch - Botswana
- Xinhua News Agency Lome Branch - Togo
- Xinhua News Agency Brazzaville Branch - Republic of Congo
- Xinhua News Agency Kinshasa Branch - Democratic Republic of Congo
- Xinhua News Agency Conakry Branch - Guinea
- Xinhua News Agency Accra Branch - Ghana
- Xinhua News Agency Libreville Branch - Gabon
- Xinhua News Agency Harare Branch - Zimbabwe
- Xinhua News Agency Yaounde Branch - Cameroon
- Xinhua News Agency Nairobi Branch - Kenya
- Xinhua News Agency Abidjan Branch - Cote d'Ivoire
- Xinhua News Agency Kigali Branch - Rwanda
- Xinhua News Agency Antananarivo Branch - Madagascar
- Xinhua News Agency Bamako Branch - Mali
- Xinhua News Agency Port Louis Branch - Mauritius
- Xinhua News Agency Maputo Branch - Mozambique
- Xinhua News Agency Windhoek Branch - Namibia
- Xinhua News Agency Johannesburg Branch - South Africa
- Xinhua News Agency Cape Town Branch - South Africa
- Xinhua News Agency Juba Branch - South Sudan
- Xinhua News Agency Lagos Branch - Nigeria
- Xinhua News Agency Abuja Branch - Nigeria
- Xinhua News Agency Dakar Branch - Senegal
- Xinhua News Agency Dar es Salaam Branch - Tanzania
- Xinhua News Agency Kampala Branch - Uganda
- Xinhua News Agency Lusaka Branch - Zambia

===== Europe =====
Xinhua News Agency European Headquarters (Brussels, Belgium)

- Xinhua News Agency London Branch - UK
- Xinhua News Agency Edinburgh Branch - UK
- Xinhua News Agency Berlin Branch - Germany
- Xinhua News Agency Frankfurt Branch - Germany
- Xinhua News Agency Paris Branch - France
- Xinhua News Agency Strasbourg Branch - France
- Xinhua News Agency Marseille Branch - France
- Xinhua News Agency Tirana Branch - Albania
- Xinhua News Agency Dublin Branch - Ireland
- Xinhua News Agency Tallinn Branch - Estonia
- Xinhua News Agency Vienna Branch - Austria
- Xinhua News Agency Sofia Branch - Bulgaria
- Xinhua News Agency Skopje Branch - North Macedonia
- Xinhua News Agency Brussels Branch - Belgium
- Xinhua News Agency Reykjavik Branch - Iceland
- Xinhua News Agency Sarajevo Branch - Bosnia and Herzegovina
- Xinhua News Agency Warsaw Branch - Poland
- Xinhua News Agency Copenhagen Branch - Denmark
- Xinhua News Agency Helsinki Branch - Finland
- Xinhua News Agency The Hague Branch - Netherlands
- Xinhua News Agency Prague Branch - Czech Republic
- Xinhua News Agency Zagreb Branch - Croatia
- Xinhua News Agency Riga Branch - Latvia
- Xinhua News Agency Vilnius Branch - Lithuania
- Xinhua News Agency Luxembourg Branch - Luxembourg
- Xinhua News Agency Bucharest Branch - Romania
- Xinhua News Agency Valletta Branch - Malta
- Xinhua News Agency Oslo Branch - Norway
- Xinhua News Agency Lisbon Branch - Portugal
- Xinhua News Agency Stockholm Branch - Sweden
- Xinhua News Agency Geneva Branch - Switzerland
- Xinhua News Agency Belgrade Branch - Serbia
- Xinhua News Agency Nicosia Branch - Cyprus
- Xinhua News Agency Bratislava Branch - Slovakia
- Xinhua News Agency Ljubljana Branch - Slovenia
- Xinhua News Agency Madrid Branch - Spain
- Xinhua News Agency Athens Branch - Greece
- Xinhua News Agency Budapest Branch - Hungary
- Xinhua News Agency Rome Branch - Italy
- Xinhua News Agency Milan Branch - Italy

===== North America =====
Xinhua News Agency North America Headquarters (New York City, United States)

- Xinhua News Agency Washington Branch - United States
- Xinhua News Agency United Nations Branch - United States
- Xinhua News Agency Los Angeles Branch - United States
- Xinhua News Agency Chicago Branch - United States
- Xinhua News Agency San Francisco Branch - United States
- Xinhua News Agency Houston Branch - United States
- Xinhua News Agency Ottawa Branch - Canada
- Xinhua News Agency Vancouver Branch - Canada
- Xinhua News Agency Toronto Branch - Canada

==== Eurasia ====
Xinhua News Agency Eurasia Headquarters (Moscow, Russia)

- Xinhua News Agency Baku Branch - Azerbaijan
- Xinhua News Agency Minsk Branch - Belarus
- Xinhua News Agency Moscow Branch - Russia
- Xinhua News Agency Vladivostok Branch - Russia
- Xinhua News Agency St. Petersburg Branch - Russia
- Xinhua News Agency Yekaterinburg Branch - Russia
- Xinhua News Agency Irkutsk Branch - Russia
- Xinhua News Agency Tbilisi Branch - Georgia
- Xinhua News Agency Almaty Branch - Kazakhstan
- Xinhua News Agency Astana Branch - Kazakhstan
- Xinhua News Agency Bishkek Branch - Kyrgyzstan
- Xinhua News Agency Ulaanbaatar Branch - Mongolia
- Xinhua News Agency Dushanbe Branch - Tajikistan
- Xinhua News Agency Ashgabat Branch - Turkmenistan
- Xinhua News Agency Kiev Branch - Ukraine
- Xinhua News Agency Tashkent Branch - Uzbekistan
- Xinhua News Agency Yerevan Branch - Armenia

== Reception ==
=== Overview ===
==== Political bias, censorship, and disinformation ====
In 2005, Reporters Without Borders called Xinhua "The World's Biggest Propaganda Machine", pointing out that Xinhua's president held the rank of a minister in the government. The report stated that the news agency was "at the heart of censorship and disinformation put in place" by the government.

In 2002, four Xinhua reporters were found to have accepted hush money to censor a story about a mine explosion that killed 37 workers. In a 2007 interview with The Times of India, then Xinhua president Tian Congming affirmed the problem of "historical setbacks and popular perceptions" with respect to Xinhua's credibility. Newsweek criticized Xinhua as "being best known for its blind spots" regarding controversial news in China, although the article acknowledges that "Xinhua's spin diminishes when the news doesn't involve China".

During the 2002–2004 SARS outbreak, Xinhua was slow to release reports of the incident to the public. However, its reporting in the aftermath of the 2008 Sichuan earthquake was seen as more transparent and credible as Xinhua journalists operated more freely.

Xinhua has criticized perceived foreign media bias and inaccurate reporting, citing an incident during the 2008 Tibetan unrest when media outlets used scenes of Nepalese police arresting Tibetan protesters as evidence of Chinese state brutality with commentary from CNN's Jack Cafferty calling China's leaders "goons and thugs". CNN later apologized for the comments.

=== Historical events ===
==== 1968 industrial espionage allegations ====
During the May 68 events in France, Xinhua and the PRC embassy press office staff were reported to exploit civil unrest to undertake industrial espionage at French factories.

==== 1989 Tiananmen Square protests and massacre ====
Xinhua staff struggled to find the "right line" to use in covering the 1989 Tiananmen Square protests and massacre. Although more cautious than People's Daily in its treatment of sensitive topics during that period – such as how to commemorate reformist CCP leader Hu Yaobang's April 1989 death and then ongoing demonstrations in Beijing and elsewhere – Xinhua gave some favorable coverage to demonstrators and intellectuals supportive of the movement. Conflict between journalists and top editors over the censorship of stories about the Tiananmen Square crackdown lasted for several days after the military's dispersal of demonstrators on 4 June, with some journalists going on strike and demonstrating inside the agency's Beijing headquarters. Government oversight of the media increased after the protests – top editors at the agency's bureaus in Hong Kong and Macau were replaced with appointees who were pro-Beijing.

==== 2012 Mark Bourrie resignation and espionage allegations ====
In 2012, Xinhua's Ottawa correspondent Mark Bourrie resigned after Ottawa bureau chief Zhang Dacheng allegedly requested him to report on the Dalai Lama for Xinhua's internal media, which Bourrie felt amounted to gathering intelligence for China. Zhang denied the allegation, telling the Canadian Press that Xinhua's policy is to "cover public events by public means" and that his bureau's job is to cover news events and file the stories to Xinhua's editing rooms, which would then decide which stories would be published. Bourrie, who had a press pass providing him access to the Parliament of Canada, had previously tried to consult the Canadian Security Intelligence Service (CSIS) in 2009 on the matter of writing for Xinhua, but was ignored by CSIS.

==== Portrayal of Indians during the 2017 Doklam standoff ====
During the 2017 China–India border standoff, Xinhua's English-language new media program The Spark released a satirical video named the "Seven Sins of India" on 16 August 2017, in which presenter Di'er Wang spoke of Indians having "thick skin" and "pretending to sleep" on the matter of the border dispute. Wang stated that India was physically threatening Bhutan, and compared India to a "robber who breaks into a house and does not leave". An actor in the video portraying "India" with a turban, beard and accent sparked allegations of racism and anti-Indian sentiment. The video was criticized on Twitter and by Indian and Western media.

==== 2018 Devumi allegations ====
In January 2018, The New York Times published an investigative report on social media promotions, alleging that the US-based company Devumi was providing "Twitter followers and retweets to celebrities, businesses and anyone who wants to appear more popular or exert influence online." The article alleged that an unnamed Xinhua editor bought "hundreds of thousands of followers and retweets on Twitter".

==== 2019 Hong Kong protests ====
In 2019, Xinhua was criticized for perceived bias in its portrayal of the 2019–20 Hong Kong protests as violent and illegitimate, which led Twitter to ban it and other state-sponsored media outlets from ad purchases.

==== COVID-19 pandemic ====
In 2020, Xinhua was one of several Chinese state media agencies reported to have been disseminating propaganda, targeted advertisements and social media posts, and news that showed the Chinese government in a better light.

In 2022, journalist Joshua Kurlantzick noted that Xinhua's coverage of the pandemic, while being "sometimes factual and on the face of it little different in style from other newswires, often downplayed the threat of the virus within China and to other countries", and that it frequently highlighted the efforts of doctors and citizens in combating the virus, while ignoring the ways China had initially covered up the signs of an outbreak and Chinese citizens' growing anger at the government's response.

==== Uyghurs ====
In 2012, Xinhua launched a Uyghur language website. In 2021, Xinhua published a "fact check" following the publication of a BBC News report on the situation in Xinjiang, which, according to The Diplomat, "included an attempt to directly refute the testimony of one witness quoted in the BBC report. (Notably, Xinhua's fact check did not address the bulk of the testimony from other survivors.)"

==== Russian invasion of Ukraine ====
During the Russian invasion of Ukraine, Xinhua and other Chinese state media outlets paid for digital ads on Facebook supporting pro-Kremlin disinformation and propaganda, including the dissemination of the Ukraine bioweapons conspiracy theory, after Meta Platforms banned Russian state media advertisement buys.

==== 2022 Chinese military exercises around Taiwan ====
During the 2022 Chinese military exercises around Taiwan, Xinhua published an altered image of a Taiwanese Chi Yang-class frigate near the coast of Hualien County, appearing to be a People's Liberation Army Navy vessel. The Taiwanese Ministry of National Defense labelled the image as disinformation.

==== 2025 India–Pakistan conflict ====
Following the 2025 India–Pakistan conflict, the Twitter accounts of Xinhua and Global Times were blocked in India after both continuously published Pakistani claims of Indian military losses during the conflict. While the block on the Twitter account of Global Times was lifted on the same day it was imposed, Xinhua's account continues to remain blocked in India.

== See also ==
- Mass media in China
- Propaganda in China
- China Xinhua News Network Corporation
- Xinhua–Sogou AI news anchor
- China News Service
