= Reference News =

Simplified Chinese newspaper

- Native name: 参考消息
- Publisher: Xinhua News Agency
- Launched: 7 November 1931; 94 years ago
- Political alignment: Chinese Communist Party
- Language: Chinese, Uyghur, Kazakh, Korean, and Mongolian
- Country: China
- Website: www.cankaoxiaoxi.com

Reference News (Chinese: 参考消息; pinyin: Cānkǎo Xiāoxī) is a Chinese newspaper published by Xinhua News Agency. It was founded in 1931 and, in mid-2010s, was ranked seventh in the world by circulation and first in China.

Reference News was first published on 7 November 1931. The early editions of the newspaper were published under different titles in Ruijin until it was renamed Reference News in 1942. It is published by Xinhua News Agency (formerly Red China News Agency, 1931–1937). As the Chinese government's official news agency, Xinhua translates and re-publishes articles by foreign news agencies. Before the 1980s, it was the only official channel for the Chinese public to have a glimpse of the outside world. The paper is also published in the Uyghur, Kazakh, Korean, and Mongolian languages for ethnic minority groups in China.

On 2 January 1985, Reference News was approved to cancel its "internal publication" designation and switched to public distribution.
