= GMA coverage of the NCAA =

- Genre: College sports
- Country of origin: Philippines
- Original languages: Tagalog; English
- No. of seasons: 6

Production
- Production locations: Various NCAA venues (event telecasts and studio segments)
- Camera setup: Multi-camera setup
- Production company: Synergy

Original release
- Network: GTV (2021–26); GMA Network (2022–24); Heart of Asia (2024–26)
- Release: May 23, 2021 – April 10, 2026

The television broadcast of the NCAA Philippines on GMA Network aired for six seasons, from NCAA Season 96 to NCAA Season 101.

== History ==
After the House of Representatives of the Philippines rejected renewing ABS-CBN Corporation's legislative franchise on July 10, 2020, the NCAA expressed dismay with what happened. By July, it was announced that ABS-CBN will close its ABS-CBN Sports unit by August 31. The NCAA then terminated its contract with ABS-CBN that should have ended on 2025, and by September, reports were published that the league was choosing among One Sports, CNN Philippines and GMA Network Inc..

The NCAA eventually chose GMA, with its CEO Felipe Gozon personally heading its presentation committee; the NCAA reportedly chose GMA when the latter offered weekend games, and the finals being aired on the main GMA Network. GMA News TV was to air the basketball tournaments, along with other events.

GMA's first program was "Rise Up Stronger", an introduction to players, coaches, teams and schools, airing on GTV (rebranded from GMA News TV) beginning on 2021. This preceded NCAA Season 96 (2020–21), a special season modified by COVID-19. The opening ceremonies features GMA talents. NCAA Season 97 is the first season with face-to-face competition, albeit under the bubble setup. "Game On!", a program presenting NCAA athletes and coaches, first aired on this season. Live basketball games were aired on GTV. The opening ceremonies featured GMA talents The finals of NCAA Season 97 men's basketball tournament was aired live both on GTV and GMA, while the volleyball tournament finals was aired live on GTV.

By NCAA Season 98, "Game On" became a magazine program aired in between basketball games. The men's finals of the NCAA Season 98 basketball tournaments still aired on GTV and GMA. GMA talents also performed on halftime breaks of basketball games. "Game On!" also aired as a weekend show during the NCAA Season 98 volleyball tournaments, and GMA aired the juniors' basketball tournament on GTV. Season 98 also heralded the return of the NCAA Cheerleading Competition, airing on GTV.

The opening ceremonies of NCAA Season 99 aired simultaneously on GMA and GTV, with the men's basketball tournament being aired on GTV. Maia and Marco, GMA's artificial intelligence presenters, debuted on this season Aside from men's basketball, GMA aired volleyball finals and the cheerleading competition in GTV.

For NCAA Season 100, GMA aired the men's basketball finals in GMA, GTV and Heart of Asia, while the cheerleading competition was aired on GTV. For NCAA Season 101, GTV aired the opening ceremony on tape delay. The men's basketball finals and cheerleading competition aired again on GTV.

NCAA Season 101 volleyball tournaments women's finals was the final NCAA event aired by GMA, as the network no longer renewed their contract. Melchor Divina, NCAA chairman, said that changing viewing habits, where its fanbase switched from terrestrial broadcasting to online platforms in YouTube and Facebook Live, caused GMA to lose sponsorships.

== Personnel ==
Play-by-play:

- Martin Javier
- Anton Roxas
- Andrei Felix
- Chuck Araneta

Analyst:

- Martin Antonio
- Beau Belga
- Jerry Codiñera
- Javee Mocon
- Rey Nambatac
- Renzo Navarro
- Mikee Reyes
- Prince Rivero

Studio hosts:

- Martin Javier
- Sophia Senoron

Courtside reporters:

- Baileys Acot (Season 97–98)
- Kayla Afable (Season 100)
- Bianca Alejandre (Season 100)
- Hannah Arguelles (Season 99)
- Tatyana Austria (Season 101)
- Mary Grace Baliday (Season 100)
- Stephanie Benito (Season 98–99)
- Chloe Carillo (Season 97–98)
- Arlove De Jesus (Season 99)
- Aya De Quiroz (Season 97)
- Flo Del Agua (Season 100–101)
- Christiana Dimaunahan (Season 97)
- Aaron Dy (Season 101)
- Alyanna Ysabelle Faustino (Season 99)
- Aleea Fedillaga (Season 100)
- Ann Gabriel (Season 97–98)
- Glycel Ann Galpo (Season 99–101)
- Lexi Gonzales (Season 99)
- Eden Hernandez (Season 97)
- Diana Marie Igual (Season 99)
- Riri Khalid (Season 100)
- Chantal Laude (Season 97–98, 101)
- Trisha Lindo (Season 98)
- Mikayla Mindanao (Season 100)
- Michelle Naldo (Season 97)
- Liezl Anne Nierves (Season 99)
- Julia Mae Ong (Season 98–100)
- Chase Orozco (Season 97–98)
- Fatima Faye Reyes (Season 98–99, 101)
- Sofia Rodelas (Season 97–98)
- Fonsie Roldan (Season 100)
- Kristine San Agustin (Season 98–101)
- Cyril Sanchez (Season 98)
- Lance Santiago (Season 97–98)
- Monique Angelika Santos (Season 99)
- Christian Sebastian (Season 97)
- Yen Supan (Season 100)
- Bianca Tagarda (Season 101)
- Erin Ty (Season 100)
- Miguel Venegas (Season 98)
- Avia Zunic (Season 97–98)

== TV coverages ==
The following tournaments have all or part of its tournaments aired on GMA television:

- NCAA basketball championships
  - Men's (Seasons 97 to 101)
  - Juniors' (Season 99 to 101)
- NCAA volleyball championships
  - Men's (Season 98 to 101)
  - Women's (Season 97 to 101)
