= Maia and Marco =

Philippine AI sports presenters

- Avatars of Maia (left) and Marco (right)
- Primary user/s: GMA Network
- Country: Philippines
- Year introduced: 2023
- Purpose: Sportscaster
- Language/s: English; Filipino

Maia and Marco are artificial intelligence used by GMA Network. Unveiled in 2023, they are used to fulfill the role of sports newscasters.

== Background ==
Maia and Marco are artificial intelligence (AI) which take the form of three-dimensional human avatars. Maia makes use of a female avatar while Marco uses a male likeness. They have aesthetic features that are typical to Filipino showbusiness personalities.

Among the technologies used in making and operating the AI include image generation, text-to-speech AI voice synthesis/generation, and deep learning face animation. They are also demonstrated to be bilingual, being able to speak in English and Tagalog (Filipino).

== Use ==
The AI pair was unveiled by GMA Network on September 24, 2023, for their coverage of Season 99 of the National Collegiate Athletic Association (NCAA).

Fulfilling the role of sports newscasters, Maia and Marco would join GMA's courtside human reporters. The AI pair are scheduled to appear four times a month on GMA's digital media platforms. They will not appear in traditional television broadcast.

== Reception ==
The launch of the Maia and Marco was met with strong reactions. Various journalists and other personalities across the Philippine media industry expressed concern that their employment be at risk with the introduction of AI. The quality of the AI ability to emulate human behavior was characterized by critics as "soulless".

GMA responding to concerns has stated that the AI would complement rather than replace its live human journalists including sportscasters.

The National Union of Journalists of the Philippines urged dialogue among its peers in the newsroom on policy on how to use AI, which the group acknowledge as "inevitable".

== See also ==
- Xinhua–Sogou AI news anchor
