= Oshigami =

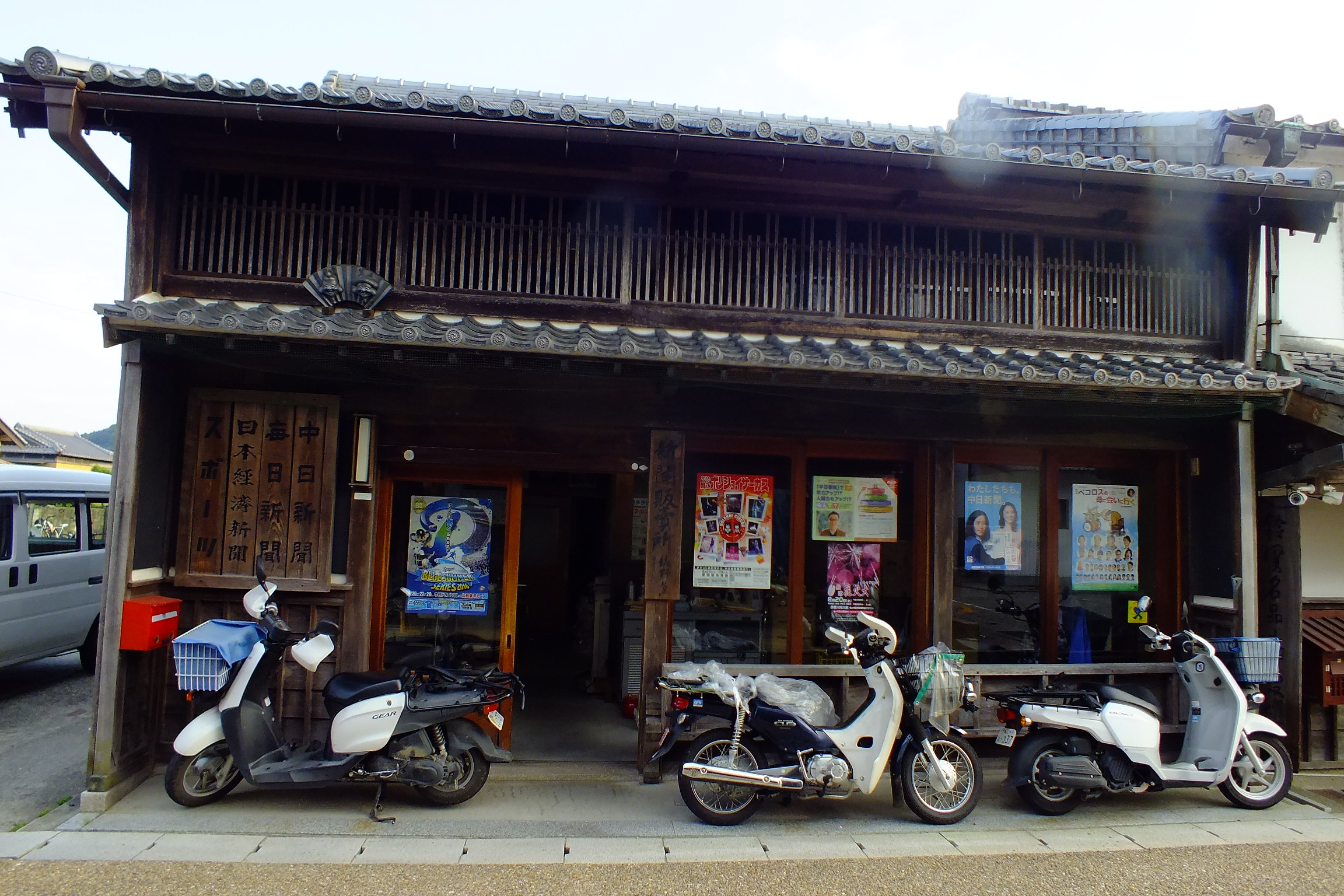
A newsagent's shop in Kameyama, Mie Prefecture, Japan.

Oshigami (押し紙) is a practice in the Japanese newspaper industry which describes the deliberate oversupply of newspapers to suppliers and businesses for the profit of the wholesaler. Along with the older age of the Japanese population (younger people are less likely to read newspapers), oshigami is one component of the apparent endurance of print circulation in Japan while printed media has seen rapid decline elsewhere with the rising popularity of online media.

The practice of oshigami arose due to differences in the sales infrastructure of newspapers between Japan and other countries with large newspaper industries. Japanese print media is primarily funded from the sales of the media itself, rather than the sale of advertisements within the media, as is common in the US and UK. Less than 33% of revenue from Japanese newspaper companies is attributed to advertisement, compared to Western newspapers where the majority of revenue can be attributed to advertisement. This has led to a greater importance on the number of newspapers sold in Japan for the newspaper to turn profit, which in turn has led to distribution networks with very large circulation. As of 2015, more than 90% of Japanese households are subscribed to at least one direct-to-home newspaper delivery. Oshigami manifests itself at the regional level, in that the middle man may deliberately order, for example, 3200 newspapers for a neighborhood of 3000, with the excess never being sold.

The practice of oshigami is illegal in Japan as regulated by the Japan Fair Trade Commission, however it is often hard to determine whether overprinting of newspapers occurs deliberately for the purpose of profit or accidentally. Overprinting occurs in every country where newspapers are sold, with roughly 18% of print runs in the UK not being sold.

== See also ==
- List of newspapers by circulation
- Japanese newspapers
- Decline of newspapers
