= List of newspapers by circulation =

Paid daily newspapers ranked by recently published circulation

- Scope: Paid daily newspapers (primarily print)
- Principal compilers: National audit bureaux; WAN-IFRA; trade press
- Latest major synthesis: 2023–2026 (mixed audit periods)

This is a list of the world's largest paid daily newspapers by recently published circulation. Circulation here means copies distributed (sold or otherwise qualified), not unique readers. Figures are drawn from national audit bureaux where they exist,

statements when no independent audit is available, and from secondary compilations by trade publications and industry associations such as the World Association of Newspapers and News Publishers (WAN-IFRA).

No single global audit exists. Rankings that present one numbered list therefore mix incompatible series: morning versus evening editions, print-only versus print-plus-e-paper, weekday versus Saturday averages, and calendar periods that can be more than two years apart. The tables below keep those distinctions visible rather than collapsing them into a false precision.

== Scope and definitions ==
Circulation is not the same as readership. A sold copy may be read by several people; readership surveys (for example India's Indian Readership Survey or Germany's Media-Analyse) therefore produce much higher figures than ABC- or IVW-style audits. Circulation is also not the same as digital audience: unique visitors, app users and bundled digital subscribers are reported separately and are omitted from the main print table unless a source explicitly folds e-paper into "sold circulation".

This article follows the convention used on the previous version of this page and by WAN-IFRA historical lists:

- Included: paid daily newspapers; morning editions are preferred when a title also prints an evening paper.
- Usually excluded: free commuter titles (for example Metro in the United Kingdom), weeklies, magazines, and unaudited "claimed" print runs except where they are the only public figure for a major state newspaper.
- Digital: treated in a separate section. Combining print copies with website subscribers produces a different ranking dominated by a handful of English-language titles.

=== Why global totals cannot be added up ===
WAN-IFRA's World Press Trends Outlook series no longer publishes a single official top-20 title list comparable to its mid-2010s reports. The 2024-2025 and 2025-2026 outlooks instead give industry aggregates. For 2024-2025 they put worldwide print circulation of daily and weekly publications at about 490.5 million copies, down 2.4% year on year, with a paying audience (print plus paid digital) of about 564 million. Those aggregates cannot be reconciled title-by-title with national ABC files.

Print still supplies most circulation revenue in many markets even as it has fallen below half of total publisher revenue among WAN-IFRA survey respondents. The geographic pattern is sharp: Japan and India continue to support multi-million print runs; China maintains large party and reference dailies whose figures are not independently audited; North America and most of Western Europe have seen paid print fall into the low- and mid-hundreds of thousands for even their largest titles.

== Largest paid daily newspapers ==
The following table lists titles that recent public sources place above roughly one million paid copies a day, plus a short second tier of the largest papers outside Asia so that Europe and North America remain visible. Rank numbers are indicative only: they order the figure shown, not a harmonised worldwide audit.

Selected paid daily newspapers by recently published circulation
Rank	Newspaper	Country	Language	Circulation	Period and basis	Source type
1	Yomiuri Shimbun	Japan	Japanese	5,367,089	August 2025; Japan ABC publisher report (national paper series)	Independent audit (ABC Japan), via secondary report
2	Asahi Shimbun	Japan	Japanese	3,212,827	August 2025; Japan ABC	Independent audit, via secondary report
3	Dainik Bhaskar	India	Hindi	3,050,064	July-December 2025; ABC India average qualifying sales	Independent audit, via trade press
4	People's Daily	China	Chinese	~3,000,000	Combined domestic and overseas print; year not independently dated in 2025 citations	Publisher / state-media compilation; not a Western-style ABC audit
5	Dainik Jagran	India	Hindi	2,330,313	July-December 2025; ABC India	Independent audit, via trade press
6	The Times of India	India	English	1,837,731	July-December 2025; ABC India	Independent audit, via trade press
7	Chunichi Shimbun	Japan	Japanese	1,614,901	Morning edition; ABC Japan average July-December 2025	Publisher media kit citing ABC
8	Malayala Manorama	India	Malayalam	~1,566,000	Average copies to 30 September 2025 (H1 FY2026)	Rating-agency summary of ABC trajectory
9	Amar Ujala	India	Hindi	1,489,970	July-December 2025; ABC India	Independent audit, via trade press
10	Hindustan	India	Hindi	1,465,947	July-December 2025; ABC India	Independent audit, via trade press
11	Nikkei (Nihon Keizai Shimbun)	Japan	Japanese	1,277,296	August 2025; Japan ABC	Independent audit, via secondary report
12	Rajasthan Patrika	India	Hindi	1,240,340	July-December 2025; ABC India	Independent audit, via trade press
13	Mainichi Shimbun	Japan	Japanese	1,176,751	August 2025; Japan ABC	Independent audit, via secondary report
—	Bild / B.Z.	Germany	German	922,991	Q2 2026 sold circulation (print + e-paper), IVW; combined Germany booking unit	Independent audit (IVW), publisher rate card
—	Sankei Shimbun	Japan	Japanese	796,577	August 2025; Japan ABC	Independent audit, via secondary report
—	Daily Mail	United Kingdom	English	531,607	Weekday average, October 2025; ABC	Independent audit, via trade press
—	Ouest-France	France	French	581,505	2025 paid France diffusion (ACPM); includes digital editions in the paid total	Independent audit (ACPM)
—	The Wall Street Journal	United States	English	391,200	Average daily print circulation, six months to 31 March 2026; AAM	Independent audit, via trade press
—	The New York Times	United States	English	222,700	Average daily print circulation, six months to 31 March 2026; AAM	Independent audit, via trade press

=== Notes on the table ===
- Japan. ABC Japan figures are widely treated as the national standard, but they include copies supplied to sales agents that critics describe as oshigami (pushed papers): unsold stock billed to newsagents. Court cases and specialist reporting have argued that actual household delivery can be substantially lower than the ABC headline. Morning and evening editions are separate products. Yomiuri's own media data for July-December 2023 put the morning edition at 6,182,228 and the evening edition at 1,548,030. Press Gazette's August 2025 world ranking still used those 2023 morning figures (6.2 million for Yomiuri; 3.57 million for Asahi). The August 2025 monthly series above is more recent and shows the continuing decline.
- India. ABC India reports "average qualifying sales" by half-year. Hindi titles dominate unit volume; The Times of India remains the largest English-language daily in the country and, on these figures, in the world. ABC certified 29.74 million average daily qualifying sales across member dailies in January-June 2025, up 2.77% on the previous half-year — a rare expansion among large print markets.
- China. People's Daily is the official newspaper of the Chinese Communist Party. State Media Monitor and Press Gazette both repeat a combined domestic-plus-international circulation "around three million". That number is not an ABC-equivalent audit. National statistics for the whole Chinese newspaper industry (2,389 titles, 24.40 billion copies issued in 2024) are published by sector reports but are not broken out title by title in a form comparable to ABC files.
- Germany and France. IVW and ACPM sold-circulation totals often include paid e-paper. Bild's 922,991 figure is the combined Germany unit of Bild and B.Z. Ouest-France remains the largest French paid daily by ACPM diffusion.
- United States. AAM print averages for the six months to March 2026 put the Wall Street Journal first (391,200) and the New York Times second (222,700). Across the 50 largest audited titles, combined daily print copies were about 1.99 million, down 15% year on year. Those print figures are an order of magnitude smaller than the same brands' digital subscriber bases.

== By country and region ==
=== Japan ===
Japan remains the only large wealthy country whose biggest dailies still print several million copies. The Nihon Shinbun Kyokai October survey put total newspaper circulation (counting a morning-plus-evening set as two copies) at 28.24 million in 2025, or 234 copies per 1,000 people, down from 71.90 million and 570 copies per 1,000 in 2000. Home delivery of a morning paper, and in many households an evening paper as well, is still a mass habit, which is why Japanese unit circulations dwarf those of newspapers in the United States or Britain.

The five national papers' August 2025 ABC totals were:

Newspaper	ABC copies (August 2025)	Year-on-year change
Yomiuri Shimbun	5,367,089	−438,006
Asahi Shimbun	3,212,827	−150,385
Nikkei	1,277,296	−82,974
Mainichi Shimbun	1,176,751	−262,406
Sankei Shimbun	796,577	−47,910
Five-paper total	11,830,540	−981,681

Chunichi Shimbun, based in Nagoya, reported a morning edition of 1,614,901 and an evening edition of 156,593 for the July-December 2025 ABC average. The Chunichi group, including Tokyo Shimbun, is often ranked just behind Yomiuri and Asahi when sister titles are added together.

=== India ===
India is the other pillar of world print circulation. ABC member dailies averaged 29.74 million qualifying copies a day in the first half of 2025. Hindi papers supply most of the volume; English, Malayalam, Telugu, Tamil and other language papers fill out the rest.

Selected ABC India figures:

Newspaper	Language	H1 2025	H2 2025
Dainik Bhaskar	Hindi	3,040,724	3,050,064
Dainik Jagran	Hindi	2,353,778	2,330,313
The Times of India	English	1,640,418	1,837,731
Amar Ujala	Hindi	1,550,356	1,489,970
Hindustan	Hindi	1,463,341	1,465,947
Rajasthan Patrika	Hindi	1,244,708	1,240,340
Hindustan Times	English	619,280	742,091

Malayala Manorama was certified at 1,816,081 daily copies for the 2023 calendar year and has since declined: CARE Ratings cites 1,655,000 for July-December 2024 and about 1,566,000 by 30 September 2025. Older Wikipedia and WAN-IFRA lists that still show Manorama above two million copies are out of date.

=== China ===
Comparable title-level audits are scarce. People's Daily is repeatedly listed among the world leaders on a claimed combined circulation of about three million. Reference daily Cankao Xiaoxi appeared near the top of WAN-IFRA lists in the mid-2010s but no audited 2024-2026 figure of similar quality was located for this revision. Official industry totals for 2024 report 2,389 newspapers, 24.63 billion copies printed and 24.40 billion issued. Those national totals confirm that China remains a very large print market; they do not license a ranked list of individual titles.

=== United States ===
Paid print is now a minority of how the largest American newspapers reach paying customers. AAM figures supplied to Press Gazette for the six months to 31 March 2026 included:

Newspaper	Average daily print circulation
The Wall Street Journal	391,200
The New York Times	222,700

In the six months to 30 September 2025 the same source had the Journal at 412,428 print copies, the Times at 228,755, the New York Post at 117,037, USA Today at 89,215 and The Washington Post at 87,576. USA Today's multi-million print figure from the mid-2010s WAN-IFRA tables is obsolete.

Digital scale is the other half of the American picture. At the end of 2025 the New York Times reported 12.21 million digital-only subscribers and the Wall Street Journal 4.29 million. Those counts are not print circulation and are not added into the world print table.

=== United Kingdom ===
ABC still publishes monthly figures for titles that have not withdrawn from the audit. In October 2025 the Daily Mail was the largest paid weekday title among those reporting, at 531,607, with a Saturday sale of 1,046,644. Free sheet Metro had an average circulation of 942,571 the same month after earlier cuts to distribution. Several large paid titles — including The Sun, The Times and The Daily Telegraph — stopped declaring ABC figures years earlier; any current "estimate" of those titles is outside the scope of an audited list.

=== Germany ===
IVW data show a market that has roughly halved since the early 2000s. Combined sold circulation of German daily and Sunday newspapers averaged 10.11 million copies a publication day in the fourth quarter of 2025, including 2.77 million e-papers. Bild remains the largest single brand. Media Impact's July 2026 rate card gives a sold circulation of 922,991 for the Bild/B.Z. Germany unit in Q2 2026 and a reach of 6.08 million readers per issue (ma 2025 / Presse II). Reach and circulation must not be substituted for each other.

=== France ===
ACPM's 2025 paid-France ranking of national and regional dailies was headed by Ouest-France (581,505), then Le Monde (559,250), Le Figaro (386,769), L'Équipe (237,817) and Le Parisien (192,505). National dailies now sell most of their paid copies as digital editions (79% of PQN paid diffusion in 2025).

=== Other markets ===
Press Gazette's 2025 survey of markets outside the Asian core noted Daily Jang in Pakistan at about 700,000 copies on weekdays and 875,000 on Sundays, and Kompas in Indonesia at about 300,000 — well outside a world top ten. Those figures are publisher- or locally reported and are listed here only as order-of-magnitude markers.

== Print versus digital ==
A list "by circulation" that ignored digital subscribers would understate the commercial reach of several Western titles; a list that added print copies to digital subscribers would bury Japanese and Indian print giants under New York and London paywalls. Both mistakes appear in older popular rankings.

WAN-IFRA estimates that paid digital circulation worldwide was about 72.6 million in the 2024-2025 snapshot used in the 2025-2026 outlook, against 490.5 million print copies. Print therefore remains, in unit terms, the larger paid medium globally. In revenue terms the balance has already shifted for many publishers in Europe and North America, where digital subscriptions, advertising and "other" activities (events, licensing, studios) now match or exceed print.

Illustrative digital subscriber counts, not comparable with the print table:

Brand	Paid digital figure	Date
The New York Times	12.21 million digital-only subscribers	Q4 2025
The Wall Street Journal	4.29 million digital-only subscriptions (average)	Q4 2025
USA Today Co. (U.S. news brands)	1.37 million digital-only paid subscriptions	End-2025

Website traffic (visits) is a third metric again. It is dominated by free or lightly paywalled English-language sites and public broadcasters and should not be inserted into a circulation ranking.

== Historical comparison ==
The version of this page that relied on WAN-IFRA's World Press Trends 2016 listed Yomiuri Shimbun at 9.10 million, Asahi Shimbun at 6.62 million, USA Today at 4.14 million and several Chinese metro papers above 1.8 million. Almost every one of those numbers is now misleading:

- Japanese national dailies have lost millions of ABC copies in a decade, even before any adjustment for oshigami.
- USA Today no longer belongs near the top of a paid-print list.
- Indian Hindi dailies have not collapsed; several remain above two million audited copies, which is why they have moved up the world ranking as Japanese and Western titles have fallen.
- Chinese title-level figures have become harder, not easier, to audit from outside the country.

Yomiuri's morning edition exceeded 10 million copies around 2010 and is the historical ceiling usually cited for a single newspaper. No title approaches that level in the mid-2020s.

== Methodological limits ==
Editors updating this page should treat the following as standing rules:

1. Prefer the national audit bureau (ABC, AAM, IVW, ACPM, ABC India, ABC Japan) over a publisher advertisement.
2. State the period. A 2023 half-year average and a 2026 monthly snapshot are not the same statistic.
3. Do not add morning and evening editions unless the source does so and the article says so.
4. Do not add print copies to digital subscribers.
5. Do not use readership, visits or social-media followers as circulation.
6. Flag unaudited official figures, especially for party newspapers.
7. Record when a title has left its audit scheme. Silence is not a stable number.

== See also ==
- Print circulation
- Newspaper
- Audit Bureau of Circulations (India)
- Alliance for Audited Media
- Informationsgemeinschaft zur Feststellung der Verbreitung von Werbeträgern
- Alliance pour les chiffres de la presse et des médias
- List of newspapers in India by circulation
- List of newspapers in the United Kingdom
- Newspaper circulation in Japan
