= Xinhua–Sogou AI news anchor =

Chinese AI newscasting software

- Avatars of the AI: English ver. patterned after Zhang Zhao (left) and Chinese ver. derived from Qiu Hao (right)
- Developer: Xinhua News Agency; Sogou
- Primary user/s: Xinhua News Agency
- Country: China
- Year introduced: 2018
- Purpose: Technology demonstration (news presenting)
- Language/s: English; Chinese

Xinhua News Agency and Sogou of China developed an artificial intelligence (AI) for news reporting purposes. The AI was unveiled in 2018. It is touted to be the "world's first AI news anchor".

== History ==
The AI was unveiled at the 2018 World Internet Conference in Wuzhen, Zhejiang, China. The AI devises avatars patterned after real life Xinhua anchors. The AI patterned after Qiu Hao spoke in Chinese, while the one derived from the likeness of Zhang Zhao speaks in English. The unveiling of the AI raised concerns of its impact on employment. Xinhua and Sogou unveiled Xin Xiaomeng, an AI with a female avatar in 2019.

People's Daily followed suit by unveiling its own AI newscaster in 2023.

== See also ==
- Maia and Marco
- Artificial intelligence industry in China
