= Samuel Chinque =

British Chinese publisher and activist

- 陳天聲
- Pronunciation: Chen Tiansheng
- Born: 22 November 1908; Kingston, Jamaica
- Died: 27 November 2004 (aged 96); Croydon, London, U.K.
- Other names: Sam Chen, Sam Ching, Sam Chan
- Occupations: Writer, publisher, social and political activist
- Organization(s): Kung Ho Chinese Mutual Aid Association, Xinhua News Agency, Chinese Seamen's Union
- Political party: Communist Party of Great Britain
- Spouse: Kin Yung (m.) Sylvia Maria Chinque (divorced)
- Children: 11

Samuel Chinque or Sam Chen (simplified Chinese: 陈天声; traditional Chinese: 陳天聲; pinyin: Chen Tiansheng; 22 November 1908 – 27 November 2004) was a British Chinese writer, publisher, social and political activist, and prominent trade unionist in the United Kingdom.

In 1947, Chinque co-founded the London branch of the Xinhua News Agency, which became the first branch of the official state run newspaper of the People's Republic of China, outside of the country. The agency's headquarters in London's Soho area occupied one of the first Chinese organisations in what was later to become London's Chinatown. After arriving in the United Kingdom as a seafarer at Liverpool Docks in 1929, he became a labour leader and supporter of the radical movement. He was known at the time as Sam Chen, leader of Liverpool Chinese seafarers. He later became the principal activist in the Save China campaign during the Japanese occupation of China (1937 – 1945) and a prominent ally to both the UK and China. He is regarded as a key figure in the British Trade Union Movement and in the emergence of a British East and South East Asian Activist Movement.

== Early life and settlement in the United Kingdom ==
Chinque was born in Kingston, Jamaica on 22 November 1908, where his parents owned stores. In 1916, when he was 8 years old, Chinque's mother died prompting Chinque and his father to leave Jamaica and move to China. In 1926, at the age of 18, Chinque became a merchant seaman, a job which involved hard manual labour and low pay.

This work soon brought him to the United Kingdom, where he eventually settled in the port city of Liverpool in 1929, the oldest Chinatown in Europe. His birth in colonial British Jamaica and his parents' Chinese nationality meant that he was entitled to both British and Chinese citizenship. There, he became the official representative of the Chinese Seamen's Union in the United Kingdom. Along with his co-workers, he began organising and campaigning for better pay and working conditions, a struggle which soon lead him to discover socialism.

== Union activism ==
As a representative of the Chinese Seamen's Union in the 1930s, Chinque worked in collaboration with the local British Seamen's Union. He is credited for helping to win the rights of equality of pay between Chinese sailors and their British colleagues working in Liverpool docks at the time, paving the way for British and Chinese seamen across ports in the United Kingdom to gain the rights for a fair wage and better working conditions.

Records which are currently held in the London Metropolitan Archives and the Modern Records Centre, University of Warwick have revealed that sailors in Liverpool were often paid 30% less if they were of Chinese appearance, whilst their white, European colleagues were not only paid higher wages, but they also benefited from a War Bonus for working in dangerous zones, if they were British.

In 1942, Chinese sailors working in the Liverpool Docks took part in a strike demanding higher pay and bonuses for working in dangerous zones, and won. Chinque helped to establish the Chinese Seamen Union in Liverpool, which was able to represent the Chinese Seamen beyond the British Seamen and Fire Brigade Union, who had previously sought to protect their own interests by pressurising shipping companies into not hiring Chinese workers. Many of these workers had migrated from Shanghai, and found their pay and working conditions in their new home, were dramatically different to that of their white colleagues. However, once World War II ended in 1945, workers offering cheaper labour from Europe and America meant that many lost they jobs unless the Chinese sailors' cut back their wages to pre-strike levels.

In 1950, his activism lead to Xinhua official sponsorship of the first May Day demonstrations in London, a celebration of working class movements and struggle.

== Political activism ==
=== 1930's and World War II ===
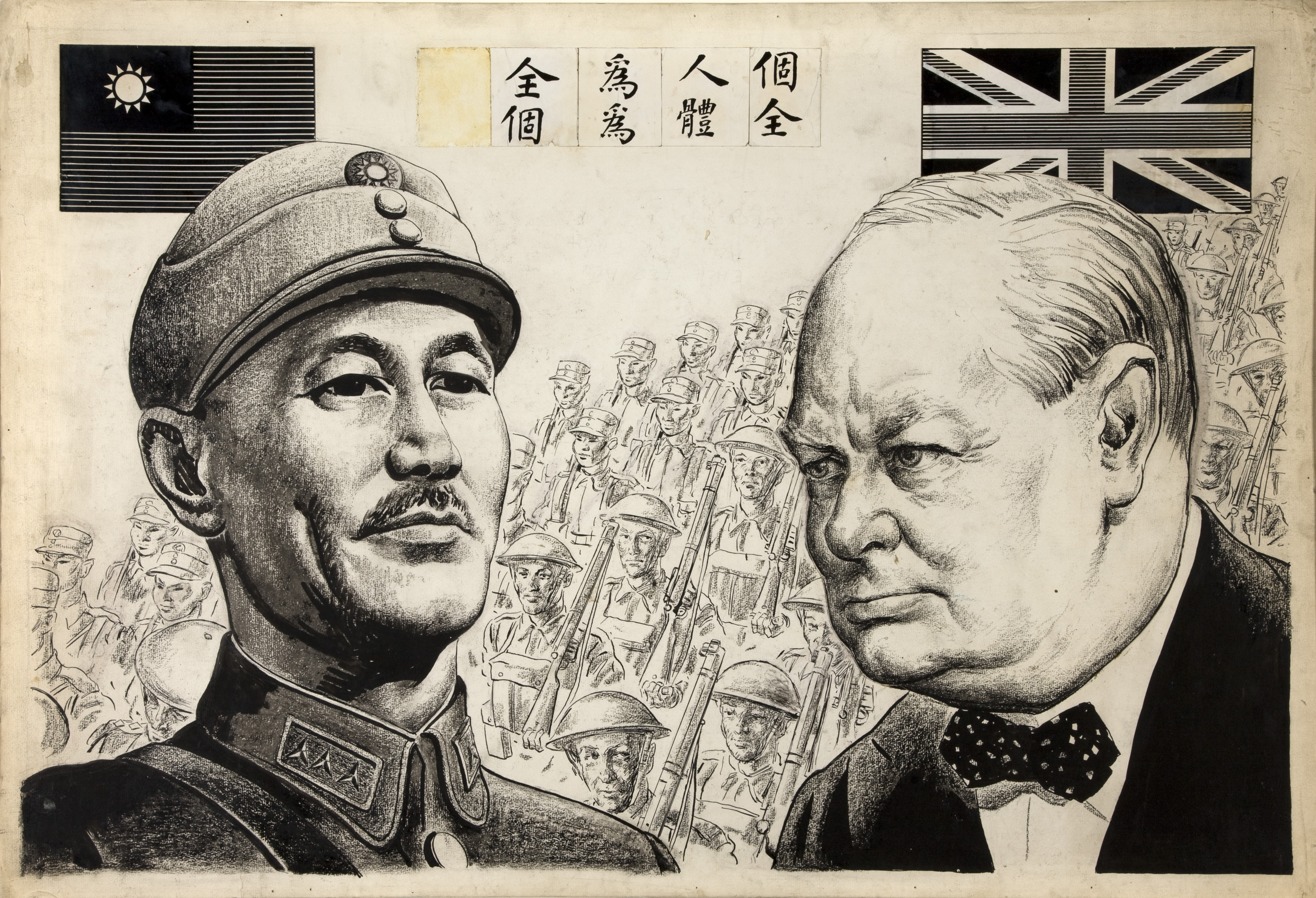
British and Chinese unity against Japan, saw propaganda posters such as this one depicting Chiang Kai-shek and Winston Churchill created to bolster morale.

In 1935, Chinque joined the Communist Party of Great Britain.

In 1937, the outbreak of the Second Sino-Japanese War was triggered by the Japanese invasion of China, an event considered as the beginning of the World War II in Asia. Following the Japanese invasion, Chinque began to organise and agitate support from the British public and the government of the United Kingdom to support China in the war against Japan, forming an organisation known as the Anti-Japan Salvation Front. His activities were largely frowned upon by the then Chinese government, the Kuomintang and the official Chinese consulate in Liverpool, which were active discouraging his work and pressuring him to desist. This eventually lead him to his political affiliation with China's communist revolutionaries. Two years later, Germany's Invasion of Poland marked the beginning of the World War II in Europe.

When Britain entered World War II in 1939, Chinque joined Liverpool's fire department in order to contribute to the war efforts in his adopted home. He served as an auxiliary firefighter whilst continuing his work as union activist campaigning for the rights of seamen and firefighters in the United Kingdom. It was during this period that he became dedicated to his own political education, and despite minimal formal academic education he began to fervently study English translations of Marxist texts. He is known for his often clashing patriotism for China throughout its modern history, and his equal devotion to the principles of socialist internationalism.

=== End of World War II and The Cold War ===
Following the End of World War II in Asia in 1945, Chinque became an informal contact person for many migrant seamen, Chinese revolutionaries and International students in the United Kingdom, particularly those from the international Chinese diaspora. His home became a meeting point and an unofficial office for his diplomatic work. Prominent visitors to his small home in Liverpool included leading Chinese revolutionaries of the time.

He eventually moved to London, encouraged by his visitors, who consider London as a more suitable base for his national influence. Here, he would see his work spread much further afield, extending into activities across continental Europe. In London, he established a mutual aid organisation focused on support for Chinese migrants in the United Kingdom and abroad, known as the "Kung Ho Chinese Mutual Aid Association."

Following the Chinese Communist Revolution in 1945, the United States and many of its western allies, including the United Kingdom, established a trade embargo on China which lead to its embassy in London being officially downgraded by the British government to a chargé d'affaires office. During this time, Chinque became a prominent member of the team of official negotiators who worked with the postwar Labour government of Clement Attlee, lobbying for the re-establishment of trade between China and the United Kingdom.

His alignment and collaboration with British Left-wing politics was publicly visible in a series of significant meetings and events, including the a Britain-China conference in 1949, organised for the purpose of promoting good relations with the "new" post-war China. It was noted in local media that the philosopher and political activist Bertrand Russell had declined an invitation, later writing in 1963 that he felt desolation over the triumph of the Chinese Communist Revolution. The event came about following the formation of a new committee chaired by John Platts-Mills, Arthur Clegg, and Reginald Bridgeman, that paved the way for the later established Society for Anglo-Chinese Understanding. Records from these events, up until 1955 name a "Sam Ching" as well as a "Sam Chen," as the principle contact between the Communist Party of Great Britain and the Ambassadors of China. Both of these names have been assumed by historians to be in reference to Chinque.

In 1963, during the rising of tensions between the communist states of Russia and new China in the Sino-Soviet split, he was ousted by the Communist Party of Great Britain when he refused to provide his endorsement of the party's shift towards a new internationalist rhetoric, which he had suspected was a cover for Russia's nationalist agenda, and as such was perceived to be following the anti-Chinese position of Soviet premier Nikita Khrushchev, who believed that China should only have the right to only lay claim over territories which were south of the Great Wall of China. Following the withdrawal of his membership to the Communist Part of Great Britain, he joined the Chinese Communist Party.

== Publishing ==
In 1947, the Chinese Communist Party invited him to establish a London branch of Xinhua News Agency, also known in the UK as the New China News Agency, the first international branch.

The headquarters became a significant landmark as the first the organisation in the United Kingdom to officially represent the new People's Republic of China and its newly ruling Chinese Communist party. Chinque become an unofficial ambassador for the People's Republic of China. He managed the London branch until he was 74, starting only with a manual hand-cranked Gestetner printing machine.

His work in London provided a blueprint for successive branches across the world.

== Personal life ==
Chinque's former wife, Sylvia Marie Chinque was a second generation British Chinese born in Liverpool. Recalling his life with her granddaughter Natascha Chinque, in the book Being Chinese: Voices from the Diaspora she tells a story of his first wife, who died during childbirth, shortly before he left China. (His first wife Lau Tai did not die. She lived till the age of 107 then died in Hong Kong in 2013. Samuel's first born son and most of the grandchildren went to her funeral.) Natascha Chinque recalls visiting her grandfather's home in London where she says every room had a picture of Mao Zedong.

He fathered 11 children with multiple partners. They are reported to live across the world, with an age gap of 60 years between his eldest and youngest. One of his children is the broadcaster and writer, Anna Chen.

In his late 70s, he reportedly floored a racist skinhead, with a single punch, after they had assaulted him on a train carriage on the London Underground.

Chinque died at home in 2004 in the company of his wife, Kin Yung, and their daughter, Chloe Chinque.

== Legacy ==
In 2008, following his death in 2004, a substantial collection of his personal papers including issues of the Xinhua weekly news sheets, photographs, letters, and documents for the Chinese Mutual Aid Association, along with his publications, official papers, writings, and poems were acquired by the London Metropolitan Archives. This archive was formed as part of a National Lottery Heritage Fund project led by the Chinese National Healthy Living Centre called the "Footprints of the Dragon."
