= Joshua Kurlantzick =

American journalist (born 1976)

Joshua Kurlantzick (born 1976) is an American journalist from Baltimore, Maryland, United States. He is a Senior Fellow for Southeast Asia and South Asia at the Council on Foreign Relations.

== Career ==
Kurlantzick was most recently a scholar at the Carnegie Endowment for International Peace, where he studied Southeast Asian politics and economics and China's relations with Southeast Asia, including Chinese investment, aid, and diplomacy. Previously, he was a fellow at the University of Southern California Center on Public Diplomacy and a fellow at the Pacific Council on International Policy.

He has also served as a columnist for Time, a special correspondent for The New Republic, a senior correspondent for American Prospect, and a contributing writer for Mother Jones. He also serves on the editorial board of Current History.

He is the winner of the Luce Scholarship for journalism in Asia and was selected as a finalist for the Osborn Elliot Prize for journalism in Asia.

== Authorship ==
Kurlantzick is the author of Charm Offensive: How China's Soft Power Is Transforming the World, which was nominated for the Council on Foreign Relations's 2008 Arthur Ross Book Award.

In December 2022, Kurlantzick published Beijing's Global Media Offensive: China's Uneven Campaign to Influence Asia and the World. In the book, Kurlantzick analyses China's use of disinformation campaigns, state media and digital infrastructure.
