= Xinhuanet =

Chinese government news company

- Native name: 新华网
- Website type: State media
- Available in: Chinese (Simplified, Traditional), English, Japanese, French, Spanish, Russian, Arabic, Korean, German, Portuguese
- Traded as: SSE: 603888
- Founded: November 7, 1997; 29 years ago
- Headquarters: No. 2 Beixing Road, Xihongmen Town, Daxing District, Beijing
- Owner: Xinhua News Agency
- Website: www.xinhuanet.com
- Registration: Optional
- Current status: Active

Xinhuanet
- Simplified Chinese: 新华网
- Traditional Chinese: 新華網
Transcriptions
Standard Mandarin
- Hanyu Pinyin: Xīnhuá Wǎng

Xinhuanet is a state media company controlled by Xinhua News Agency. Headquartered in Beijing, it operates more than 30 local channels distributed across China and manages more than ten sub-websites of Xinhua News Agency. The company is listed on the Shanghai Stock Exchange.

== History ==
The Xinhua website was established on 7 November 1997, and named the Xinhua News Agency Website with the URL: www.xinhua.org. In March 2000, it was renamed Xinhuanet. In July 2000, Xinhua Network Co., Ltd. was established and Xinhuanet used the new domain name www.xinhuanet.com. On 12 December 2000, Xinhuanet was approved to engage in news publishing business. On 25 August 2002, the second working floor of the Beijing Xidan Gaodeng Building was officially put into use. The total area of the website has reached more than 4,300 square meters, making it the largest Internet news publishing service platform of the Chinese Communist Party (CCP). In 2012, Xinhua launched a Uyghur language website.

In June 2026, Xinhuanet filed plans to invest over CN¥1.1 billion into a project named "Xinhua Yudian", which is "an intelligent agent for learning, researching, and disseminating Xi Jinping Thought on Socialism with Chinese Characteristics for a New Era". it will be focused on "spreading the positive voice" and provide users on information on current affairs and political news content to help them cope with information overload and "a dilemma of trust in distinguishing truth from falsehood".

== Content ==
The website publishes news information in seven languages, including Chinese (Simplified and Traditional), English, French, Spanish, Russian, Arabic and Japanese. The international outreach of the site has been described as "part of the state's online foreign propaganda project".

== Corporate affairs ==
On January 8, 2012, following the listing of People's Daily Online on the A-share market last year, IPO application information on the China Securities Regulatory Commission's website showed that Xinhuanet's application for listing on the Shanghai Stock Exchange had been accepted. On October 28, 2016, Xinhuanet's shares were listed on the Shanghai Stock Exchange.
