= Kodomo shokudō =

Social activity in Japan

Kodomo Shokudō (Japanese: 子ども食堂, also written as こども食堂 or 子供食堂; English: Children’s Cafeteria) is a social activity in Japan designed to provide "nutritious meals and warm, happy surroundings" to children, their parents/guardians, and local residents for free or at a low price.

Since the 2010s, widely reported by mass media such as television, the number of establishments has surged across Japan as an effective means of resolving "solitary eating" (koshoku), connecting children with adults, and fostering local community cooperation. While some children's cafeterias limit users to "children or families in poverty," many aim for "creating a safe space (ibasho) for children and preventing solitary eating," as well as "intergenerational exchange" and "community building." In such cafeterias, children and families from non-impoverished households also use the services. According to the NPO "Musubie" (Japan Network for Children's Cafeterias), there were at least 10,866 locations in the fiscal year 2024, exceeding 10,000 for the first time since the survey began in 2018.

== Overview ==
There is no clear, singular definition of a Kodomo Shokudō; operational forms vary by operator, as do participation fees, frequency, and menus.

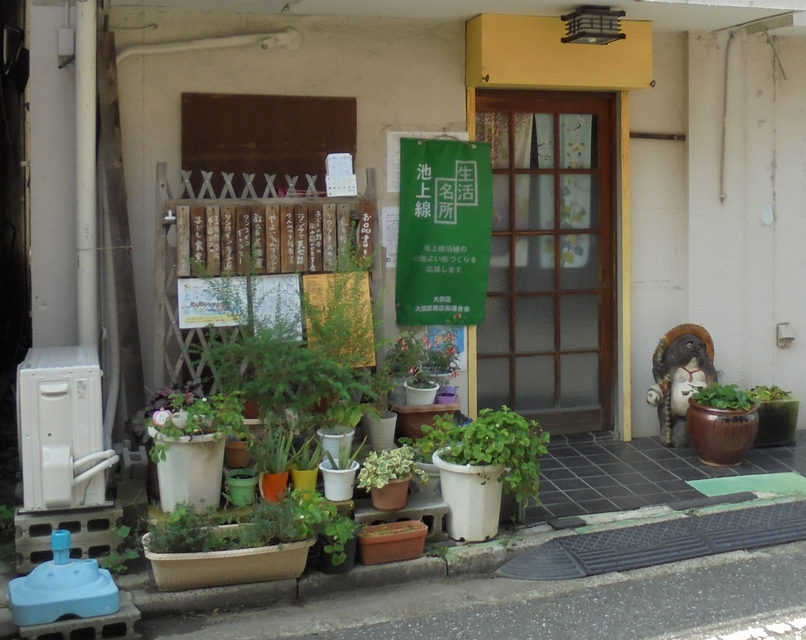
"Kimagure Yaoya Dandan" in Ota Ward, Tokyo

If a definition must be stated, the "Kimagure Yaoya Dandan Kodomo Shokudō" in Higashiyaguchi, Ota Ward, Tokyo—considered the first children's cafeteria—defines it as "a free or low-cost cafeteria where a child can come alone with peace of mind." (Note: Quoted from Spread the Circle of Kodomo Shokudo! National Tour.) The national tour "Spread the Circle of Kodomo Shokudo!", which aimed to create regional networks, followed this definition, stating, "We interpret 'Kodomo Shokudo' broadly, not just as cafeterias for children (from troubled homes), but also cases where children participate in meal gatherings for the elderly, for example."

The private organization "Toshima Kodomo WAKUWAKU Network" (abbreviated hereafter as "WAKUWAKU"), involved in operating children's cafeterias in Toshima Ward, Tokyo, defines it as "a place providing meals to children and parents for a low price or for free." (Note: Quoted from WAKUWAKU 2016, p. 19.) The Kodomo Shokudo Network (described below) defines it as "a place where children can eat alone, and where local people provide meals for free or for a small amount." (Note: Quoted from Minami 2016, p. 1.)

There are also cases that effectively fulfill the role of a children's cafeteria even if they are not called "Kodomo Shokudō." Examples include organizations providing daily meals as part of local child support, groups providing meals before or after study support, or gatherings for the elderly that are opened to children and child-rearing demographics for intergenerational dining.

== History ==
=== Background ===
Activities providing meals in the community already existed in Japanese history during the late Showa era. By the 1980s, as nuclear families became common and the idea that caregiving should be borne by society rather than just the family permeated, volunteer activities providing group meals or meal delivery for the elderly living alone began to spread widely across Japan. Meanwhile, child poverty reportedly began to attract social attention around 2008 (Heisei 20), and the issue of wait-listed children (for nursery schools) surfaced around 2013 (Heisei 25). In 2013, the Act on the Promotion of Measures against Child Poverty was enacted, and various projects began to increase across Japan as countermeasures against child poverty.

While the specific activity known as Kodomo Shokudō became active in the 2010s as mentioned above, initiatives for children's safe spaces (ibasho) and meal support existed prior to that. Examples include cooking and eating with children facing solitary eating or skipped meals at children's centers (jidōkan), meal gatherings at play parks, and community cafes or municipal hall meal gatherings. Tako Nakamoto, a former probation officer in Hiroshima Prefecture, has continued to host the "Tabete Katarou Kai" (Eat and Talk Gathering), a free meal provision project for children and adolescents from disadvantaged family environments, since 1982 (Showa 57); some consider this the original children's cafeteria. There is also an opinion that a 2008 report stating "there were 30,000 children who could not see a doctor due to poverty even if sick or injured" led to the expansion of children's cafeterias.

=== Birth of the Children's Cafeteria ===
The name "Kodomo Shokudō" is believed to have first been used in 2012 (Heisei 24), when a "Kodomo Shokudō" was established in a corner of the aforementioned "Kimagure Yaoya Dandan." The shop owner, Hiroko Kondo, had opened "Kimagure Yaoya Dandan" in Ota Ward, Tokyo, in 2008 to sell organic vegetables requested by an acquaintance while working as a dental hygienist. Through interactions with local residents coming to shop, various issues became visible, and the greengrocer developed into a place for community interaction, study support for children, and re-learning for adults. During this time, the vice-principal of a nearby elementary school told her about "children whose only meal other than school lunch is a banana." Hearing this, in 2012, she opened a cafeteria in "Kimagure Yaoya Dandan" under the name "Kodomo Shokudō," intending it to be "a place where it is okay for a child to enter alone."

=== Development of Cafeterias ===
In 2012, the aforementioned WAKUWAKU was launched, and the "Kanamecho Asayake Kodomo Shokudō" opened in Kanamechō, Toshima Ward, Tokyo. When its activities were introduced on the NHK information program Asaichi in April 2014 (Heisei 26), it attracted significant attention from mass media including television, newspapers, and magazines, sparking the nationwide spread of children's cafeterias. This became a catalyst for the spread across Japan. According to Keiko Amano, the Secretary-General of WAKUWAKU, after this broadcast, requests for visits and interviews increased, and the initiative was featured on many TV programs such as Close-up Gendai+ (NHK), Oikonomia (NHK Educational TV), and NEWS23 (JNN). As mentioned, meal support for children existed previously, but the naming "Kodomo Shokudō" was successful, leading to increased media coverage.

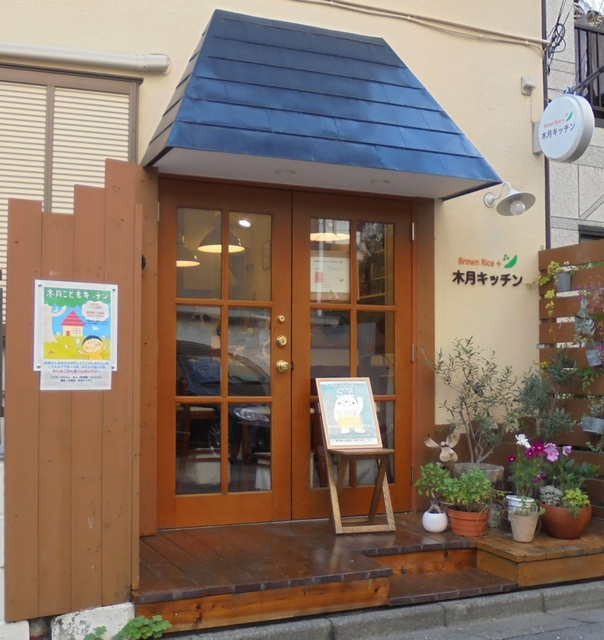
"Kizuki Kodomo Kitchen" in Nakahara Ward, Kawasaki City, Kanagawa Prefecture, a participating store in the "Kodomo Shokudo Network."

In 2015 (Heisei 27), the "Kodomo Shokudo Network" was launched to create horizontal connections between cafeterias and coordinate ingredients and information; many cafeterias from Hokkaido to Kyushu participated. In the same year, the "Kodomo Shokudo Summit" was held by WAKUWAKU. Many people who learned about children's cafeterias at this summit expressed desires to start or help with one, becoming one of the triggers for the nationwide spread. In January 2016 (Heisei 28), the summit was co-hosted by the Kodomo Shokudo Network and WAKUWAKU. 20 children's cafeterias in the metropolitan area that started activities between 2015 and 2016 participated, and over 300 participants gathered—far exceeding the capacity of 200—including many wishing to open new cafeterias.

From April 2016, a national tour titled "Spread the Circle of Kodomo Shokudo!" began, aiming to raise awareness in all prefectures of Japan and create local networks. In the same year, efforts to create cafeterias became active, such as "How to Make a Kodomo Shokudo" lectures held in Tokyo for people who wanted to start one but didn't know how.

Subsequently, various organizations for the establishment and operation of children's cafeterias continue to be established across Japan, such as the "Fukushima Kodomo Shokudo Network" in Fukushima Prefecture, the "Ibaraki Children's Place/Study Support/Kodomo Shokudo Network Conference" in Ibaraki Prefecture, the "Nara Kodomo Shokudo Network" in Nara Prefecture, and the "Kodomo Shokudo Network Kitakyushu" operated mainly by Kitakyushu City, Fukuoka Prefecture.

Regarding mass media, in addition to the reports mentioned above, programs such as Weekly News Fukayomi (NHK) ("1 in 6! What to do about 'Child Poverty'") in 2013 and the NHK Special Invisible "Poverty" ~Children Robbed of Their Future~ brought issues like child poverty to the surface. Many children's cafeteria operators state that watching these TV programs made them want to solve these problems.

In 2019, FamilyMart announced it would roll out "Famima Kodomo Shokudo" in the eat-in spaces of approximately 2,000 convenience stores starting in March. The sessions accommodate about 10 people, offering bento boxes and other items for 100 yen for elementary school students and younger, and 400 yen for junior high school students and older. The target is children and guardians living near each store, and children elementary age or older can use it alone with parental consent. The secretariat of the Kodomo Shokudo Network commented that this was likely the first time a nationwide company had proactively engaged in such an initiative.

According to a fiscal 2023 survey by the nonprofit organization Musubie (Japan Network for Children's Cafeterias), the number of children's cafeterias nationwide increased by 1,769 from the previous year to 9,132. This result is almost on par with the combined number of public junior high schools and compulsory education schools nationwide (9,296). The total annual number of participants is 15.84 million.

By prefecture, the highest numbers are "Tokyo" with 1,010 locations (as of Oct 2023), 2nd "Osaka" with 757 (as of June 2023), and 3rd "Hyogo" with 521 (as of Oct 2023). The lowest were "Akita" with 38 (as of Sept 2023), 46th "Fukui" with 41 (as of Oct 2023), and 45th "Nagasaki" with 48 (as of Sept 2023).

Since the first children's cafeteria was born in Ota Ward in 2012, they have increased at a rapid pace. However, because children's cafeterias are private activities that do not require notification to local governments, and there are cases effectively providing the same function without using the name "Kodomo Shokudō," the actual total number is unknown.

== Content ==
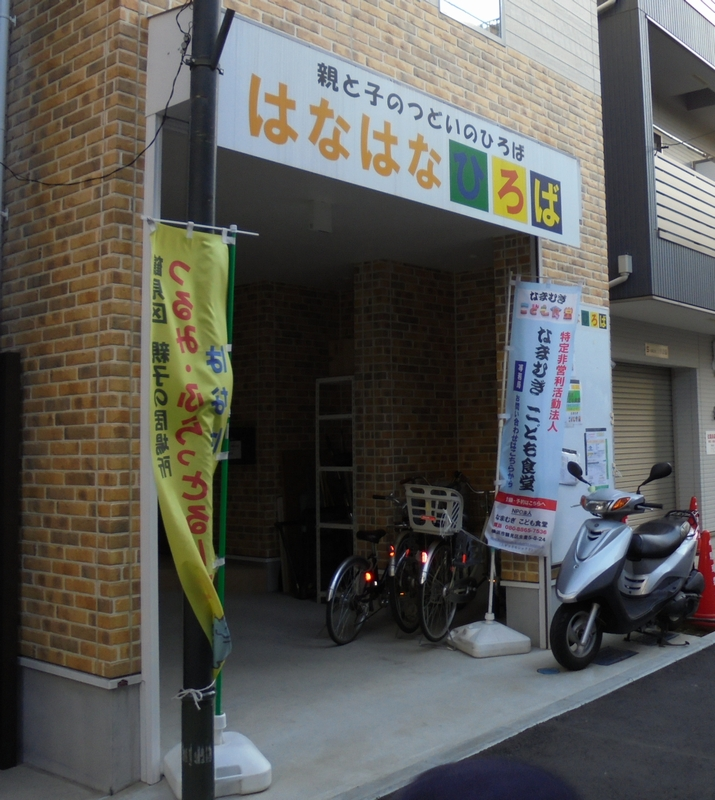
"Namamugi Kodomo Shokudo" in Tsurumi Ward, Yokohama City, Kanagawa Prefecture

=== Frequency and Timing ===
The most common frequency is once a month, followed by once every two weeks, and once or twice a week. Operators have noted that "a monthly pace allows for long-term continuation without overstraining."

Regarding timing, daytime on weekends and holidays is the most common, followed by weekday evenings. Some cafeterias operate during breakfast hours before school, lunchtimes on weekends when there are no school lunches, focus on long vacation periods, or operate strictly during summer or winter vacations.

=== Participation Fee (Price) ===
More than half of the cafeterias offer free participation for children, sometimes with conditions such as "helping out." When there is a fee, it is often between 50 and 500 yen, with 100 to 300 yen being common. Fees for guardians and adults are often set higher than for children. Some places are completely free for both children and adults.

Some shops have adopted a mechanism where adults can decide their own payment amount based on what they have so that those in financial difficulty do not feel burdened, while those with means can pay more to serve as a donation.

Note that many children's cafeterias use the term "participation fee" rather than "price" to clarify that it is a volunteer activity, not a profit-making business.

=== Meal Content ===
The meals provided vary by cafeteria: vegetable-centered dishes in agricultural regions, balanced meals, dishes prepared by professional chefs, buffet style dining, etc.

Considering health and food safety, some cafeterias advertise the use of organic vegetables, no chemical seasonings, no animal products, or measures against food allergies.

Beyond nutritional balance, some shops have a "Meat Day" once a month to satisfy appetites, or serve multi-generation favorites like curry rice periodically. Others serve rice cakes, soup, and New Year dishes during New Year's.

In areas with many non-Japanese residents, considerations are sometimes made for ingredients prohibited for religious reasons. In some cases, for children in severe situations, cafeterias may freeze a week's worth of meals and deliver them to homes or go to homes to cook.

=== Activities Other Than Meals ===
In addition to meals, activities are often combined, such as study support, time for homework, cooking participation to build self-catering skills, and spaces for interaction with local residents. Some are provided as playgrounds. Even if adults don't organize play, children often start playing naturally. Some locations also serve as free "cram schools" (juku).

While children with family issues such as solitary eating or poverty visit, many shops maintain a stance of not prying into circumstances but waiting until the parties involved ask for help. Conversely, some locations aim to embrace children's problems entirely; for example, one cafeteria located in part of a Christian monastic facility is headed by a former welfare commissioner and staffed by consultation workers for junior/senior high students, alongside cooking and study support staff, and holders of specialized qualifications like Autism Spectrum Support Specialists.

In recent years, with the increase in natural disasters, the role of children's cafeterias during emergencies has gained importance. Efforts are progressing to make them "regional disaster prevention bases" that perform distribution and soup kitchens during disasters, not just meal providers. The NPO Musubie supports the strengthening of this role by collaborating with local groups to conduct disaster prevention training and distributing manuals.

=== Target Participants ===
Originally started to provide meals and safe spaces for children from poor families or those eating alone, the number of cafeterias not limiting their target—welcoming all local children, parents, and adults—is increasing. Many visitors seek interaction with children or a family-like atmosphere, and sharing tables is common.

In shops where adults can participate, participation by mothers and children is frequent. Mothers who tend to be isolated visit as a place to interact with their generation, and in areas with many elderly people, many visit saying "it's better than staying home alone."

Some shops do not use the name "Kodomo Shokudo" in their title, aiming to be a space open to all residents, not just children.

According to a fiscal 2021 survey by Musubie, only 5% of children's cafeterias limited children's participation conditions to "economically distressed households." The survey states that children's cafeterias are becoming "places for community building where multiple generations interact." (Note: Quoted from Yamashita 2022, p. 18.)

== Operation and Costs ==
Regarding personnel, costs, and ingredients, as mass media coverage has increased, cooperation has begun to grow, including direct ingredient provision from producers, cooking volunteers, and monetary donations.

=== Operators ===
Operations are conducted by NPOs, private groups, resident volunteers, and individuals. While experts are involved in some places, the majority are run by volunteers; the low barrier to entry of simply "providing meals" contributes to the ease of volunteer operation.

According to a secretariat member of the Kodomo Shokudo Network, housewives in their 50s and 60s who have finished child-rearing form the core of the activities. Volunteer personnel include local housewives, culinary students, home economics students helping with cooking, and university students playing with children. Some places have child volunteers. There are also many cases where people thinking of starting a children's cafeteria participate as volunteers to observe. In some instances, mothers who brought their children enjoyed the atmosphere so much they became staff. In Ikeda City, Osaka Prefecture, a young man who experienced the Osaka school massacre as a first-grader manages a children's cafeteria to repay the community that supported him and to watch over children himself. The Kodomo Shokudo Network accepts donations, which are used for expansion/renovation and operational subsidies.

The certified NPO Katariba, focusing on child poverty countermeasures, was commissioned by Adachi Ward to operate "Adachi Base" starting in 2016, providing meals as part of its activities. Meal preparation there involves local children and neighbors cooking, eating, and cleaning up together, aiming to create a sense of security and opportunities for recognition through shared experience.

Regarding operators other than the general public: elementary school PTAs participate in some operations; local doctors may serve as advisors; staff from local social welfare corporations may volunteer to drive transport vehicles. Some shops are held in schools with principals and teachers participating to talk with children and parents. In Okinawa Prefecture, many personnel from US military bases participate as volunteers, which has been well received. Collaboration with Consumer Co-ops and Japan Agricultural Cooperatives (JA) began around 2016.

The scale of activities varies from large-scale events with dozens of participants to small-scale ones with about 10 people.

=== Costs ===
Operational costs are mainly covered by donations and out-of-pocket expenses. Many cases involve soliciting donations after reporting activities on websites or Facebook; some cafeterias raise funds through crowdfunding. Yahoo! Net Fundraising has accepted T-Point donations for organizations working on children's safe spaces since May 2019.

Costs are also covered by public subsidies and grants from private companies. Some prefectures provide grants to operating organizations as model projects, and in some prefectures, local welfare organizations provide financial aid, advice, and support. Many municipalities and groups enter the field because it is easy to commercialize.

There are cases where children attending the cafeteria make donation boxes to place in community centers or local clinics, operators sell original stationery to supplement operations, or proceeds from bazaars run by the elderly are donated.

=== Ingredients ===
Methods for procuring ingredients vary: purchasing from nearby supermarkets or shopping streets, donations, bringing leftovers, or receiving items that cannot be sold due to scratches or deformities. Ingredients are sometimes sourced from food banks.

JA branches provide rice and vegetables as community contribution activities, and volunteer farming groups or residents who grew too many vegetables in home gardens provide produce.

In one case, when a children's cafeteria asked a wedding venue for leftovers from buffet dishes, the venue, feeling "leftovers would be rude," prepared and delivered fresh rice dishes and soups instead.

While meat is provided less frequently than vegetables or rice, some pig farmers provide meat for free. Some places use offerings from temples.

=== Locations ===
Locations used include public facilities like community centers (Kominkan) and children's centers, as well as offices, vacant stores, private homes, restaurants, interaction spaces in medical or nursing facilities, and temples. Some coffee shops hold them on regular holidays, wanting to "let kids eat a feast made by a pro."

They are also held in corporate employee cafeterias, elementary school lunchrooms, university student cafeterias, vacant houses, closed schools, trailer houses, rental warehouses, shrines, and churches. In one case, a single-family home where the owner lived alone due to family circumstances offered the entire house except for the bedroom, serving as a play area in addition to a dining space.

== User Opinions and Analysis ==
=== User Opinions and Effect on Solitary Eating ===
Children who visited have expressed thoughts such as "It's fun to eat together," "Strangely, I can eat things I dislike when eating with everyone," and "It's fun to eat dinner together after playing with friends." Children prone to eating alone have said, "I'm happy because sometimes there is no food at home." Mothers visiting with children have commented, "My child eats more," and "I can't make this many dishes or get this many vegetables on my own."

Beyond meals, children say, "I look forward to it every time because there are interesting adults," and "It feels like having a big family." Adults have commented, "Children can play freely, making it a stress relief," "It becomes a catalyst to talk with others," and "My days are hectic, so I felt calm coming here." Mothers have become friends, creating opportunities for information exchange. On the operational side, some elderly women say helping at the cafeteria is their purpose in life. There are instances where elementary school children and elderly men bond over common hobbies. In the Tohoku region affected by the Great East Japan Earthquake, there are voices hoping it will help rebuild community ties lost in the disaster.

=== Analysis by Experts ===
Toru Yoshida, a political scientist involved in operating the "kaokao" children's cafeteria in Sapporo, Hokkaido, states that the needs are diverse: not only children from poor families but also "solitary eating" (eating alone even if wealthy), "fixated eating" (always eating the same thing), and "individual eating" (eating only one type of food). Resolving these various forms of "ko-shoku" leads to improvements in children's health, educational environments, and parenting issues. He also notes that because administration (government) has not intervened with subsidies and various restrictions, flexible operation is possible.

Toshiko Takeya, a politician working on child poverty and food loss issues, states that children's cafeterias have a significant function in supporting children through "food" and preventing isolation by involving many people alongside nutritional management.

Additionally, secondary effects are noted: eating together increases interaction and information exchange between children and local adults, leading to local network formation; and local residents recognize the reality of child poverty through children's visits. As mentioned, receiving unsellable ingredients helps solve food loss.

== Prejudice, Misuse, and Issues ==
=== Prejudice that Users are "The Poor" ===
According to a 2023 questionnaire by Musubie, the two main "troubles" cited were securing necessary resources (funds, ingredients, manpower) and notifying/delivering support to those who need it (poor families, etc.). While some cafeterias limit users to poor families, many are "places anyone can use," with many non-poor users. However, the misunderstanding that "Children's Cafeteria = Place for poor families" persists, and some people fear that being seen entering one will label their family as poor. Consequently, there are reports that "children truly in poverty" find it difficult to use or avoid entering such cafeterias.

For similar reasons, it is pointed out that girls, in particular, find it hard to visit; one report showed a male-to-female ratio of 8 to 2. A cafeteria in Ota City, Gunma Prefecture, expected 30–40 users but only had 10–20, attributed to the spread image that it was for poverty households.

Due to mass media reporting, the image of "Kodomo Shokudo = Poverty Countermeasure" spread too widely, leading to points raised that some children feel awkward visiting, or parents prohibit entry. The pioneer "Kimagure Yaoya Dandan" also noted that early media coverage focused heavily on the poverty countermeasure angle.

There are cases where requests to use community centers were met with resistance, such as "It will be seen as an area where the destitute gather" or "There are no poor children here." Organizers had to explain repeatedly that it is a place for any child to enjoy before getting approval. Critics point out that finding a cafeteria requires information gathering skills, and visiting requires action and transport costs—resources that those in the depths of poverty may lack. There are fears that children facing abuse are forbidden from going by parents fearing discovery.

For cafeterias operating as "places anyone can use," a common problem is "how to get children who really need support (poverty, solitary eating) to come." Reports include: "We opened every day during winter break, but the child we wanted to come came only once"; "A whole kindergarten class and parents came, and the child we really wanted stayed away"; "Instead of troubled families, ordinary parents come for cheap, healthy meals"; and "Visits by mothers aiming to skip cooking dinner are increasing."

Examples of distancing the image from poverty include intentionally not using "Kodomo Shokudo" in the name, using only "Kodomo," or not using "Kodomo" at all. Some places bill themselves as "Children's Ibasho" (Safe Space) rather than cafeterias. (Note: The store name is not literally "Children's Ibasho," but the activity is described as such.) To avoid the poverty label, some shops set the target to "all local residents." Some shops emphasize the concept of a "cafeteria anyone can visit" from the start and avoid attitudes of "supporting the weak." Some use the name "Community Cafeteria" (Chiiki Shokudo) to encourage elderly and disabled people to drop in.

One measure for children who cannot ask for help themselves is "Kodomo Takushoku" (Children's Food Delivery), started in Bunkyo Ward, Tokyo, in October 2017. This involves delivering ingredients and processed foods directly to homes of users who apply via LINE, a precedent-setting initiative that has been well received.

Amidst debates on perception, a 2022 SNS post asking "Can anyone go to a Kodomo Shokudo?" garnered attention and was featured by NHK. While some said "one shouldn't go," opinions that "anyone can go" appeared. Perception is changing. Musubie director Makoto Yuasa stated in the NHK report, "If everyone doesn't go, the people who are really struggling can't go either. Going there is itself support. A Kodomo Shokudo is a place that wraps up everyone, including those who are struggling, in a casual way."

=== Awareness ===
A concern for operators is whether information reaches the children who really need meals. Voices say "existence hasn't permeated the community" or "publicity is insufficient." A survey in Tatebayashi, Gunma, in March 2017 revealed over 40% of guardians knew nothing about children's cafeterias. In fiscal 2023, a Musubie survey showed high awareness (87.7%) but only 47.3% "knew the content," indicating a need to spread correct information. Government backup in public relations is sought as a solution.

=== Location Issues ===
Requirements for locations include cooking facilities and being within walking distance for children; some view this as the biggest operational challenge. In Adachi Ward, Tokyo, people wanting to start cafeterias reportedly hit dead ends regarding location.

One cafeteria was forced to close because it rented a bar, which had few stoves and high chairs that were uncomfortable; parking costs were also an issue. Private homes have limits on space, and announcements are hard to distribute, making casual drop-ins difficult.

Solutions include unique initiatives like "Machikado Kodomo Shokudo: Good Morning Banana!" providing a place to eat a banana on the way to school for children skipping breakfast. Another method distributes meal tickets valid at local restaurants ("Machinaka Kyushoku"). Tickets are funded by donations, and restaurants are reimbursed. A variation involves customers purchasing tickets for children ("Gochimeshi"). (Note: An application of the "coffee ticket" system.) These methods utilize existing restaurants, resolving issues like "few operating days," "psychological barrier to entry," and "limited menus," while spreading as a casual donation method.

=== Hygiene ===
Since meals are provided, hygiene issues like food poisoning are a concern. If one cafeteria causes food poisoning, it could affect the entire movement.

Normal cafeterias require operating permits with washing equipment and inspections, but welfare-purpose cafeterias are often judged not to need permits, which is viewed as a problem.

Agnes Chan, a doctor of education, wanted to help after learning of children's cafeterias but was stopped by friends saying, "It would be terrible if food poisoning occurred." Social activist Makoto Yuasa noted that in over 20 locations visited during the national tour, participants everywhere asked about hygiene and insurance. While many join some insurance, Yuasa points out some have not managed to do so.

To address this, some cafeterias conduct food safety training, create/distribute hygiene manuals, and pay close attention to ingredient handling. Some mandate stool tests for cooking staff or strictly heat all food. In April 2018, crowdfunding began for the "Kodomo Shokudo Safety and Security Improvement Committee" to support cafeterias with insurance.

=== Operational Funds and Abuse Issues ===
Operational funds are a challenge. As mentioned, despite soliciting donations, in reality, most funds are often borne by the representative, making securing funds for sustainable expansion a problem.

While mass media helped spread the movement, media power is temporary, so long-term supporters are needed.

Some argue that feeding children is originally an administrative responsibility and a welfare issue for schools. In practice, some teachers provide rice balls out of their own pockets for students coming to school without breakfast.

Critics argue that holding cafeterias only a few times a month or week does not lead to solving child poverty.

Chieko Akaishi, director of NPO "Single Mothers Forum," evaluates the initiative as "wonderful" but asks, "Of the 3 million children said to be in relative poverty, what percentage can connect to this?"

Some argue that since the need arises from deepening parental poverty, caregiving, and labor issues leading to neglect, fundamental resolution requires changing these social issues. Conversely, others argue that while cafeterias don't solve poverty, they trigger awareness that can lead to social change.

==== Surge and Commercialization after Public Funding ====
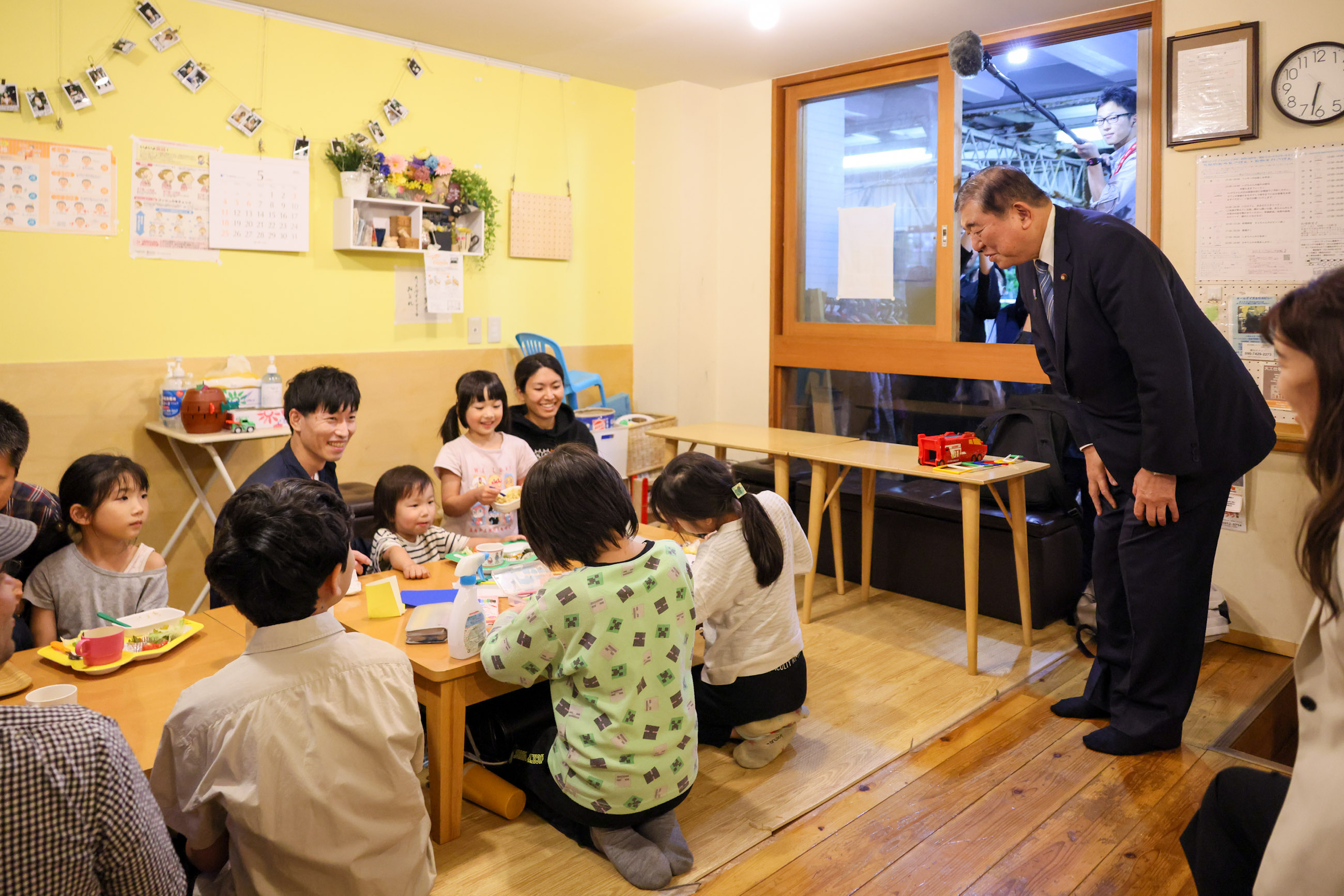
Shigeru Ishiba visiting a Kodomo Shokudo (NPO Dream Town). May 2025.

The Chunichi Shimbun reported in November 2022 that while the image improvement and public funding of children's cafeterias led to a surge in numbers and diversification—reducing the "only for poor kids" bias—it also created issues of political activists and restaurants using them for publicity. If "poverty countermeasures" offer meals at standard cheap dining prices, abuse is rare. However, if they are free or cheaper than general dining, non-poor people living nearby may come to save living costs, causing a surge in demand (users and number of cafeterias). This is likened to taking free advertising pocket tissues even if not needed. In 2016, operators noted, "More ordinary parents come for cheap healthy meals than troubled families," pointing out the gap between the image and reality. Similar problems occurred with free/low-cost elderly medical care in Japan, leading to "convenience store clinic visits" and "social hospitalization," inflating social security costs. If free/cheap, children (or elderly) who aren't truly poor (or sick) gather. This problem is less visible when purely volunteer-run, but surfaces when public funds or corporate donations are involved and profit becomes possible. Actually, when local governments decided to support children's cafeterias, the number exploded—not necessarily because poor children increased in that area, but because public funds made it a potential "poverty business" where funds for "personnel" and "materials" could be pooled.

In Japan, the poverty rate of "single-parent households with children" decreased from 1985 to 1991, rose to a peak of 63.1% in 1994, then trended downward (except 2009–2012), reaching a record low of 44.5% in 2023. The overall "child poverty rate" was under 15.5% since 1985, rose to 15.7% in 2009, peaked at 16.3% in 2012, and has since decreased, hitting a low of 11.5% in 2021. Reasons for the decline include rising earnings in low-income households and increased dual-income households (especially female labor).

== International Analogues ==
In the United States and the United Kingdom, initiatives like "Breakfast clubs" provide meals before school and after-school study support as poverty countermeasures. As of 2010, 87,000 schools (70% of 125,000) in the US, and as of 2007, 46% of primary and 62% of secondary schools in the UK implemented this. Some UK breakfast clubs use special government subsidies for eradicating child poverty, viewed by some as a model for Japanese countermeasures.

In Leipzig, Germany, the "Leipziger Kinder-Erlebnis-Restaurant" (Children's Experience Restaurant) was opened in 2012 by a support group for women and children. It focuses on teaching cooking fun, nutrition, and health, not just providing meals.

In Finland, playgrounds called "Leikkipuisto" provide free meals to children on weekdays during summer vacation. Operated municipally as "the safest place for children," there are 65 locations in the capital, Helsinki.

== See also ==
- Sustainable Development Goals (SDGs)
  - Child poverty
  - Malnutrition
  - Food loss and waste
  - Food bank
  - Community fridge
  - Food rescue
- Poverty threshold
  - Single-parent
  - Soup kitchen
- School lunch in Japan
- Famine food
- Solitary eating (Ko-shoku)
- Bar mleczny (Poland)
- Food truck
- Meals on Wheels
