= Junnosuke =

- Gender: Male

Origin
- Origin: Japanese
- Meaning: Different meanings depending on the kanji used

Junnosuke (written: 淳之介, 純之助, 準之助, 潤之介, 隼ノ介 or 潤之輔) is a masculine Japanese given name. Notable people with the name include:

- Junnosuke Inoue (井上 準之助; 1869–1932), Japanese businessman and banker
- Junnosuke Kawaguchi (河口 純之助; born 1961), Japanese musician
- Junnosuke Ofusa (大房 淳之介; 1908–1994), a Japanese journalist
- Junnosuke Schneider (シュナイダー 潤之介; born 1977), Japanese footballer
- Junnosuke Taguchi (田口 淳之介; born 1985), Japanese singer-songwriter, actor and model
- Yoshibayama Junnosuke (吉葉山 潤之輔; 1920–1977), Japanese sumo wrestler
- Junnosuke Suzuki (鈴木 淳之介; born 2003), Japanese footballer
- Junnosuke Yoshiyuki (吉行 淳之介介; 1924-1994), Japanese writer

== Fictional characters ==
- Junnosuke Tachibana (橘淳之介), the main protagonist of the visual novel and anime series Nukitashi
- Junnosuke Aoki (青木淳之介), a minor character in the anime series Smile Pretty Cure!
- Junnosuke Kitagawa (北川潤之介), a character in Devil Summoner: Soul Hackers
- Junnosuke Kuroda (黒田純之介), a minor character in Persona 2: Eternal Punishment
- Junnosuke Sanada (真田淳之介), a character in Readyyyy! Project
