= Junichi Ueno =

Japanese journalist (1910–1997)

- Born: Ueno Jun'ichi; November 11, 1910; Japan
- Died: October 19, 1997 (aged 86); Japan
- Known for: Journalist
- Children: Shōichi Ueno

Junichi Ueno (上野 淳一, Ueno Jun'ichi; November 11, 1910 – October 10, 1997) was the co-owner of the Asahi Shimbun (朝日新聞, , Asahi Shinbun).

This powerful Japanese journalist owned and published a newspaper which is the second most circulated out of the five national newspapers in Japan. During the years of his ownership, Asahi's circulation rose to approximately 8.27 million for its morning edition and 3.85 million for its evening edition. Ueno represented the third generation of the family who owned the newspaper and its subsidiary businesses, which included television and satellite broadcasting.

== Biography ==
After graduating from Kyoto University with a degree in economics, he joined the newspaper in 1937. He held several posts at Asahi and served as a member of its executive board during World War II. After Japan's defeat in 1945, he resigned from Asahi along with several other executives who took responsibility for Asahi's one-sided reporting during the war.

He then briefly worked as an elementary school teacher and later took a position at the Kobe University of Commerce. After that, he served as secretary to Kōtarō Tanaka, who was then Chief Justice of the Supreme Court of Japan.

In 1952, Ueno returned to the family business to head of Asahi's newly established employee training center. He inherited ownership of the media conglomerate in 1970 when his father died, and was a board member until 1994.

Ueno was known for his support of the Ueno Memorial Foundation, a research institution devoted to studying Buddhist art and culture.

Junichi Ueno died in 1997. His son, Shōichi Ueno, succeeded him as the co-owner of Asahi Shimbun. Shōichi Ueno remained the newspaper's co-owner until his own death on February 29, 2016.

== Ueno Library ==
Ueno was active in the Ueno Library at Kyoto University, a repository for materials about Japanese and British newspaper history.

The foundation of the National Diet Library microfilm collection of newspapers began with copies from the Ueno Library.

== See also ==
- Junnosuke Ofusa
- Japan Newspaper Publishers and Editors Association
