= Ueno Riichi =

Ueno Riichi (Japanese上野理一, Go(号) : Yuuchiku (有竹); October 29, 1848, in Sasayamanishi in Tamba Province – December 31, 1919, in Osaka ) was a Japanese newspaper manager in the Meiji and Taishō eras.

== Life and work ==
Ueno Riichi was the eldest son of Ueno Yasubei (上野保兵衛), a money changer who was a supplier to the Aoyama clan of Tamba, and his wife Kaneko (兼子). After the peasant uprising in 1869 and the sudden death of his father, he moved to Kobe around 1869 and was involved in the tea trade from 1872. In 1877, Miyoshi Shigeomi (三好重臣; 1840–1900), the commander of the Osaka garrison, employed him as a house manager. In 1880 he became executive secretary of Kawanabe County in Hyōgo Prefecture, but in the same year Hosomi Tadashi (細見貞) recruited him to the Asahi Shimbun newspaper . In 1881 he took part in the management as a joint investor and has since developed the Asahi Shimbun with Murayama Ryūhei (1850–1933) in both Tokyo and Osaka. In 1908, the Asahi Shimbun companies in Tokyo and Osaka merged to form the Asahi Shimbun Limited Partnership Company. After that, he alternated with Murayama as president every year.

At this time, the Osaka Asahi Shimbun in particular campaigned for the Taishō democracy. When the so-called “White Rainbow Incident” occurred in 1918, he suffered from illness, but took over as president in place of Murayama, who resigned, and worked to resolve the situation by meeting with the criticized prime minister Hara Takashi to settle. He retired from the board in 1919 when the Asahi Shimbun was converted into a stock corporation. He died at the end of the year.
