= Shōichi Ueno =

Japanese newspaper publisher and philanthropist (1936–2016)

Shōichi Ueno (上野 尚一, Ueno Shōichi; 1936 – February 29, 2016) was a Japanese newspaper publisher, philanthropist and co-owner of the Asahi Shimbun, Japan's second largest daily newspaper in terms of circulation. Ueno served as the co-owner of Asahi Shimbun from 1997 until his death in February 2016.

Ueno was the great-grandson of the co-founder of Asahi Shimbun, Riichi Ueno (1848-1919). In 1879, Ueno and his business partner, Ryuhei Murayama (1850-1933), established Asahi Shimbun in Osaka. Riichi Ueno became the newspaper's co-owner in 1881. Shōichi Ueno earned a law degree from Keio University in 1958. He first joined the staff of the Asahi Shimbun Company in 1962. An executive at the newspaper's Tokyo offices, Ueno held positions within Asahi Shimbun's advertising, sales and international departments.

In 1997, Ueno became the Asahi Shimbun's co-owner upon the death of his father, Junichi Ueno. Shōichi Ueno remained the newspaper's co-owner until his own death in February 2016.

He served on the board of directors of the Ueno Memorial Foundation for the Study of Buddhist Art, which was founded by the Ueno family in 1970 to research Buddhist art and culture. He was also a councilor for the Kyoto National Museum.

Shōichi Ueno died from lung cancer at a hospital in the Shinjuku ward of Tokyo on February 29, 2016, at the age of 79.
