= Junnosuke Ofusa =

Japanese journalist

Junnosuke Ofusa (1908–1994) was the first journalist ever to receive Japan's Order of the Sacred Treasure. He was presented with the Fourth Class Order of the Sacred Treasure in a ceremony at the Foreign Ministry for "the service he has rendered in promoting friendly relations between Japan and the United States for many years." Emperor Hirohito later received Mr. Ofusa at the Imperial Palace.

== New York Times Tokyo Bureau ==
Ofusa managed the Tokyo Bureau of The New York Times for nearly six decades. He was hired in 1930 by the first bureau chief for The Times in Tokyo, Hugh Byas. Across the decades, Ofusa worked with more than twenty bureau chiefs and correspondents assigned to Tokyo, acting as reporter, interpreter and fixer. The next bureau chief, Otto D. Tolischus, was arrested on the day the Japanese attacked Pearl Harbor. For months Mr. Ofusa took food and clothes to Mr. Tolischus in prison, until he was sent to the United States in a prisoner exchange. When the American occupation army swept into Tokyo in 1945, Mr. Ofusa greeted the arriving correspondent, Lindesay M. Parrott, with a smile, saying: "I did my best to defeat your country. But now the war is over."

In 1981, Ofusa celebrated his first fifty years with the Times Tokyo Bureau. A.M. Rosenthal, the executive editor of The Times, and his wife, Ann, were the hosts at a reception at the Foreign Correspondents' Club of Japan. The reception was attended by 150 guests, including U.S. Ambassador Mike Mansfield. Among the guests attending the reception were Ryugen Hosokawa, Japan's leading television commentator and an old friend of Mr. Ofusa, and Junichi Ueno, a major stockholder and owner of the mass circulation newspaper, the Asahi Shimbun. Seiki Watanabe, president of the Asahi, and Junzo Onoki, president of the Japan Newspaper Publishers and Editors Association (Nihon Shinbun Kyokai), were represented by senior officials and board members. Numerous high-ranking Foreign Ministry officials were present.

== Order of the Sacred Treasure ==
An Imperial invitation to the palace was eagerly accepted. Ofusa later told a New York Times colleague:

"I have worked hard for the maintenance of United States-Japanese relations throughout my life .... When the war broke out, I did everything I could as a Japanese subject for my country. But never did I dream that I, as an employee of The New York Times and a working journalist, would have a great honor bestowed upon me by His Majesty the Emperor."
