= Japan Newspaper Publishers and Editors Association =

The Japan Newspaper Publishers and Editors Association (日本新聞協会, Nihon Shinbun Kyōkai) (NSK) is an entirely independent and voluntary organization funded and operated by the mass media of Japan. The NSK was established on July 23, 1946. Its express purpose is to elevate ethical standards in reporting and protect and promote the media's common interests. The NSK has been criticized as limiting the foreign press, local Japanese media outlets, over-representing the large national newspapers, and monopolizing representation with government officials, especially in regards to censorship.

The functions of the NSK fall into the following six categories:

- maintenance and elevation of ethical standards
- coordination, protection and promotion of common interests
- research
- seminars
- public relations
- international activities

The NSK is involved in conducting seminars and lectures, and compiling a newsletter in an effort to increase education of the newspaper business in Japan and around the world.

A study by the NSK, "Newspapers Take On The Digital Information Age; Can Journalism Survive?", came to four main conclusions.

- ...that it is becoming more important for editors and publishers to make every effort to heighten the reliability of newspapers in the multimedia age.
- ...that in order to protect newspaper's public role as a medium of expression and reporting.
- ...that newspapers should try to aggressively take part in electronic and electric wave media that merge telecommunications and broadcasting services.
- ...that newspapers should unite to solve such imminent problems.

== See also ==
- Junnosuke Ofusa
- Junichi Ueno - co-owner of Asahi Shimbun
