= School lunch in Japan =

School lunch system in Japan

A school meal (whether it is a breakfast, lunch, or evening meal) is a meal provided to students and sometimes teachers at a school, typically in the middle or beginning of the school day. In Japan, this usually refers to school meals served as lunch. The origin of school meals provided in Japan is in 1889, where an elementary school provided free meals for children who could not bring food to school. Post–World War II school meals usually had a loaf of bread and skimmed milk, although rice returned to school meals in 1976.

School nutritionists usually plan the menu for school meals in Japan, and students usually serve the food to students themselves. Local meals are served in some regions.

== History ==
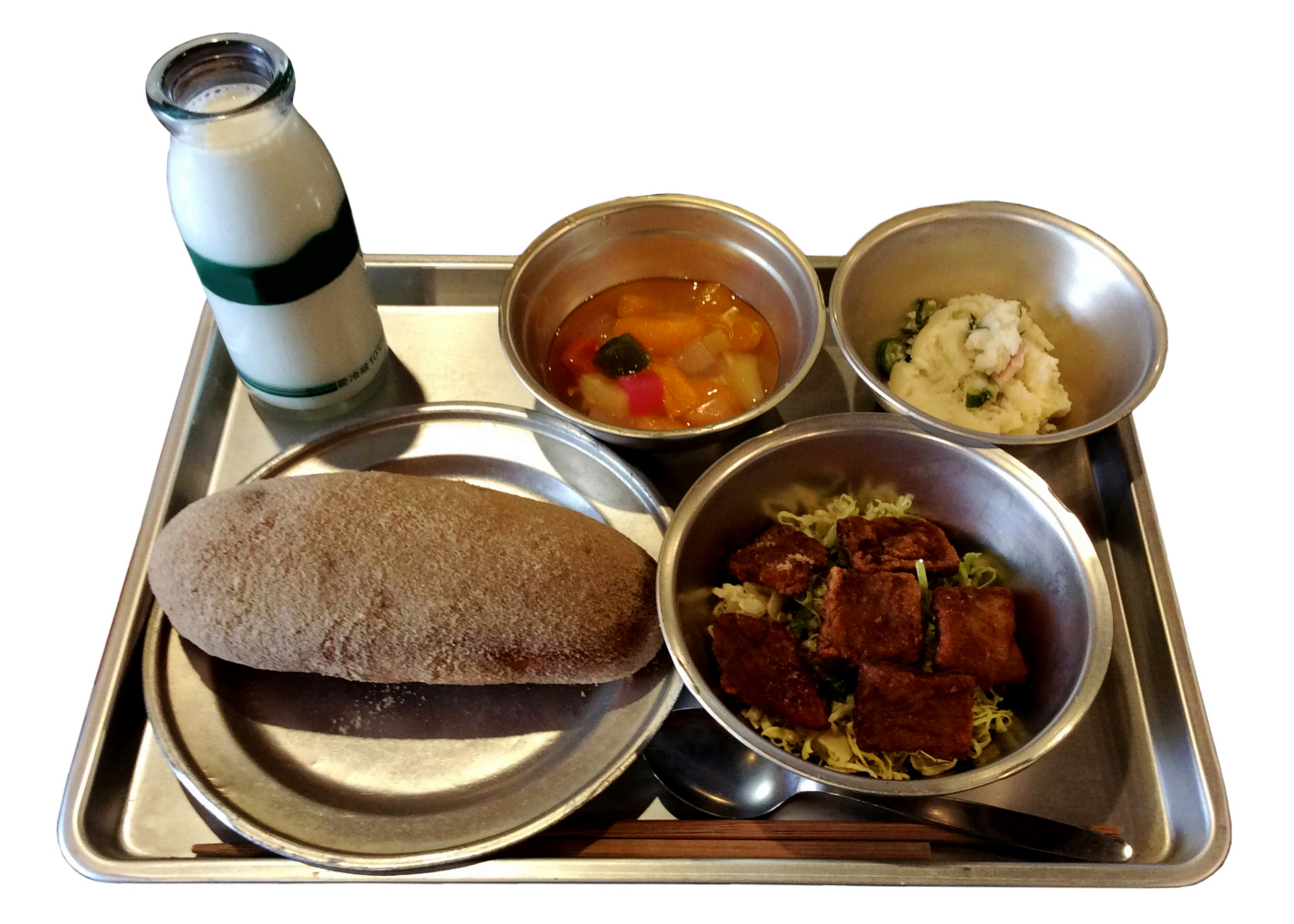
Reproduced Japanese school lunch, 1970s

School meals in Japan were first provided in 1889 at an elementary school located in the current-day city of Tsuruoka, when the school provided free meals for children who could not bring food to the school. The system was encouraged by the government in 1923 and the school meal system spread across the country, until it was abolished due to food shortages. After World War II, school meals started to be provided again with the support from the Allied forces in Japan and the American organization Licensed Agencies for Relief in Asia. When the Treaty of San Francisco was signed in 1951, the American aid ended on June of the same year, putting the school meal system at risk of ending. In 1954, the School Lunch Act was passed, which endorsed providing school meals in all schools. However, as this was not mandatory, some schools in Japan do not provide school meals to this day.

These post-war lunches initially included items such as bread, bread rolls, and skimmed milk powder (replaced in 1958 by milk bottles and cartons). Later, lunches were expanded to include flour donated by an American charity; a dessert; and a dish (such as daikon) that changed daily. Rice was not served in school lunches until 1976, and lunches were based on bread before then. This is due to the low supply of rice in the post-war era, rice being expensive compared to bread, and high costs of installing equipment to serve rice. In 1967, as rice supply increased, and the government started to implement rice in school meals.

Whale meat was served as well until the 1970s, although it made a comeback and was served in Osaka Prefecture in 2021.

== Participation ==
The School Lunch Act did not require schools to serve school meals. However, the vast majority of Japanese schools serve school lunches; in 2014, 99.2% of elementary schools and 87.9% of junior high schools did so.

The city of Yokohama did not serve school meals in middle schools until April 2018, when the city began providing them. A few middle schools in cities like Machida do not serve meals.

== Nutrition ==
Studies suggest that the school lunch program has contributed to Japan's low rate of overweight and obesity among children, and closed socioeconomic gaps in intake of fruits and vegetables among elementary school students.

A 2017 study concluded that school lunches improved the overall quality of the diets of Japanese students (especially with respect to increased vitamins and minerals intake) but provided insufficient dietary fiber.

== Issues ==
=== School meal costs ===
A survey conducted by the Ministry of Education, Culture, Sports, Science and Technology found that there is a significant disparity between schools on lunch costs, with the most expensive costing 1.4 times more than the lowest.

Many municipalities find it difficult to maintain quality of school lunches with the rising ingredient costs, with chicken meat being provided instead of pork and beef in many schools. Some municipalities, especially in urban areas, were found to be serving fewer school meals than the national guidelines.

=== Failure to pay school meal bills ===
Some parents who have the ability to pay for school meals have been seen purposefully refusing to pay for them. Attempts to refuse serving school meals to children whose parents refuse to pay the bills has been criticized as violation of the law as discrimination on education. Additionally, parents who are in poverty cannot pay for the school meals. In 2015, 4 middle schools in Kitamoto, Saitama, announced that the schools will refuse to serve school meals if the bills were not paid for 3 months, reducing the number of parents not paying them from 43 to 3.

=== Allergy problems ===
There are over 527,000 students in public primary and middle schools in Japan with food allergies as of 2023, which is 6.3% of all students. Overall lack of care for these students has been shown, mainly due to lack of staff and regulations.

== Current ==
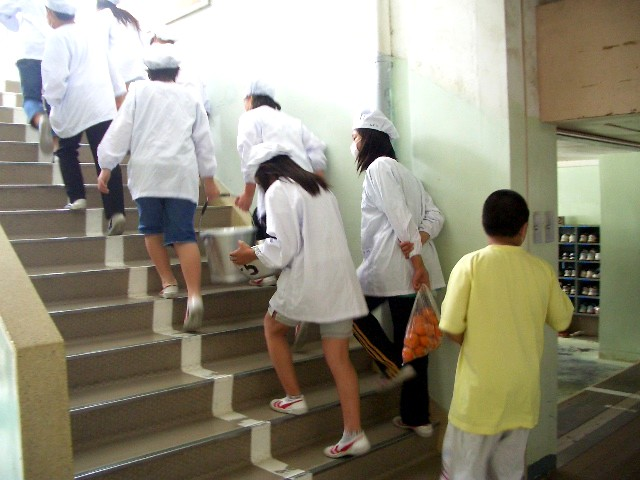
In Japan, students set and clean the tables.

Japanese school meals are not cooked from frozen ingredients, and sometimes they are cooked in the schools. In many schools, school nutritionists make the recipes for the meals. Students serve the meals themselves and also do a part of the clean-up, instead of hiring janitors. According to Chico Harlan:

Though Japan's central government sets basic nutritional guidelines, regulation is surprisingly minimal. Not every meal has to meet precise caloric guidelines ... Central government officials say they have ultimate authority to step in if schools are serving unhealthy food, but they can't think of any examples where that actually happened. ... And because this is food-obsessed Japan, those standard meals are restaurant-worthy; in fact, Adachi Ward publishes a full-color cookbook based on its best school meals. [However,] Japanese cuisine isn't automatically healthy; it includes crispy chicken, rich bowls of salty ramen with pork belly and battered and deep-fried tempura. But, like most cuisines, it can be healthy. ... You don't see dessert, other than fruit and yogurt. You occasionally see fried food, but in stark moderation.

In both elementary school and middle school, students put on white coats and caps and serve their classmates, who then all eat together in their classrooms instead of in a cafeteria.

Local meals, such as crabs in Toyama Prefecture and takoyaki in Osaka Prefecture, are sometimes served in schools around the country.

According to a survey by Ministry of Education, Culture, Sports, Science and Technology in 2021, 99% of elementary schools and 91% of middle schools served school meals.

At the chōsen gakkō (North Korean schools in Japan), Korean foods, such as kimchee, are served.

=== Role in education ===
School meals in Japan are considered a part of food education. In the Basic Act on Shokuiku, established in 2005, food education is positioned as "the basis of a human life which is fundamental to intellectual education, moral education, and physical education".

Until the 1970s, school meals in Japan had a high priority in reducing picky eaters and curing malnutrition. As a result, some schools banned students from leaving out foods, and in rare cases, teachers fed food to students by force, or kept students in the classroom until they ate it, resulting in traumas. This practice was heavily criticized among people as a violation of human rights.
