= Chieko Akaishi =

Japanese activist and founder of Single Mothers' Forum (born 1955)

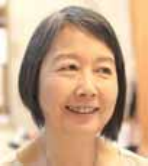
- Akaishi
- Born: 1955 (age 70–71)
- Occupations: writer; activist
- Known for: Director of Single Mothers Forum

Chieko Akaishi (Japanese: 赤石千衣子, Akaishi Chieko; born 1955) is a Japanese activist who served as the founding chairperson of the nonprofit Single Mothers' Forum until June 28, 2025, when she officially announced her retirement.

== Biography ==
She is a single mother herself.

She established the Single Mothers' Forum in 1980, which at that point was just a voluntary organization of single mothers trying to fight for improving the child-rearing allowance system. In 2002, the organization became an NPO and started to focus more broadly on single mothers' issues, and it became a certified NPO in 2018. She was its founding chairperson and has used that role to fight for support for single mothers.

She has been an advocate for reform of the welfare systems. For example, she's advocated for removing the rule that people receiving welfare must, with very few exceptions, use up their assets (such as cars) before being able to receive welfare. She has also been a noted feminist advocate, and as early as 2006 began getting quoted on feminist issues.

She has been noted as one of the most prominent and politically powerful opponents of joint custody in Japan. She has stated her opposition is due to domestic violence issues and the fear that the abused partner may be forced into providing joint custody.

She sat on the Expert Committee on Support for Single-Parent Families on the Social Security Council, and was a member of The Asahi Shimbun editorial board. She called for and assisted in the creation of the Single Mother Support committee, a Japan-wide committee of single parent support groups.

She has authored two books, Boshi katei ni kanpai! (Here's to Single Parent Families) and Hitori-oya Katei (Single-Parent Households).

During her tenure as chair, in 2023, the organization faced fund misuse issues, with some 8 million yen going missing. According to statements, an employee who was in charge of financial records was the one to falsify these records.

She resigned as chair at the age of 70 on June 28, 2025.
