= The Asahi Shimbun =

Japanese newspaper

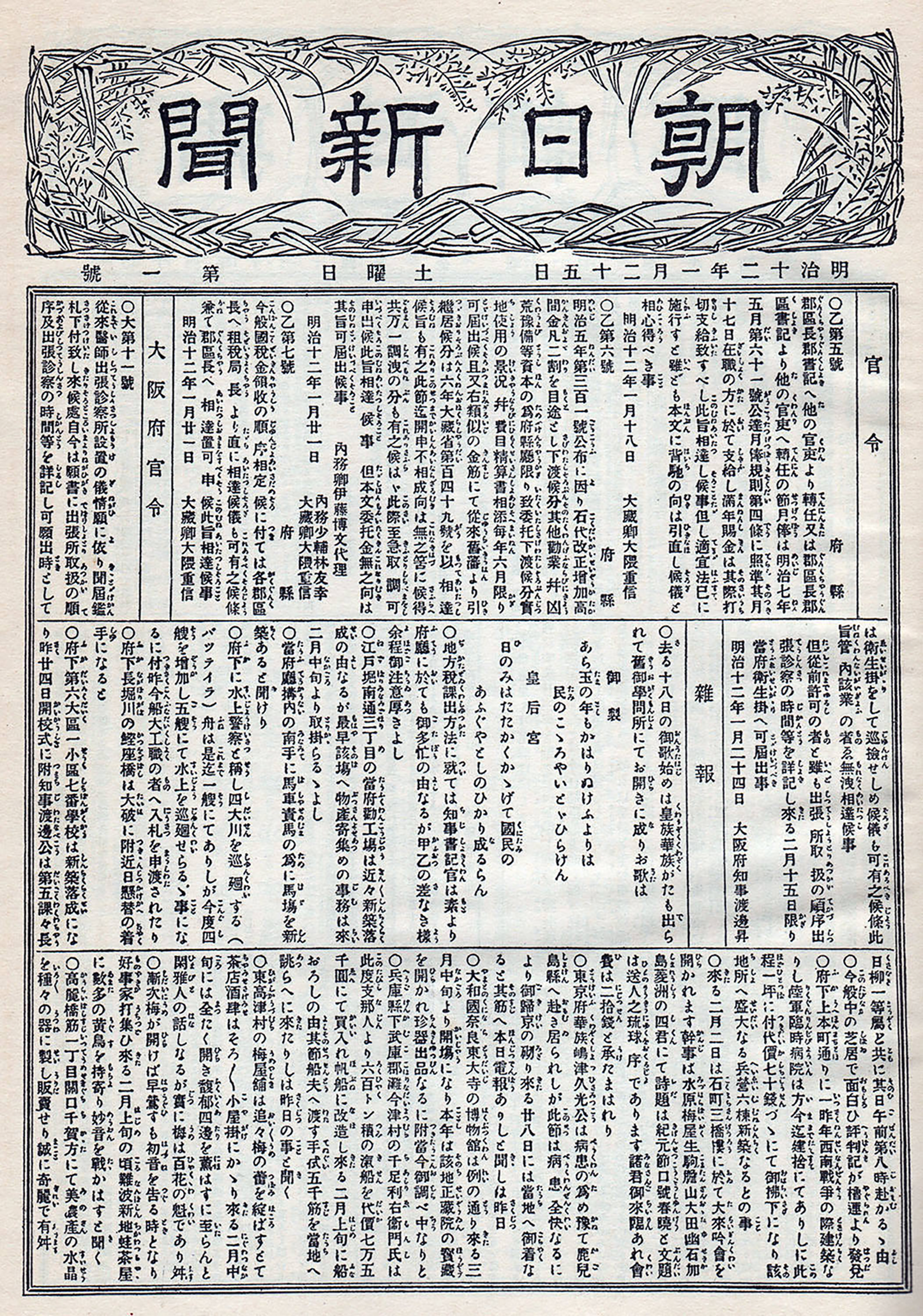
- First issue on 25 January 1879
- Type: Daily newspaper Company type: Private
- Format: Blanket (54.6 cm x 40.65 cm)
- Owner(s): Repurchased shares (25%); Murayama family (21.02%; 10% through the KOSETSU Museum of Art); Ueno family (total 14.22% by Shōichi Ueno's death in 2016); TV Asahi (11.88%); Toppan (7.31%); Asahi Broadcasting Group Holdcorp (2.31%)
- Founder(s): Murayama Ryōhei; Ueno Riichi
- Founded: January 25, 1879; 147 years ago
- Political alignment: Liberalism (Japanese); Social liberalism; Centre-left
- Headquarters: Nakanoshima, Kita-ku, Osaka, Japan
- Country: Japan
- Circulation: Morning edition: ▼3,264,440; Evening edition ▼892,295; (January–June 2025)
- Website: www.asahi.com (Japanese) www.asahi.com/ajw (English)

Flag of the Asahi Shimbun Company

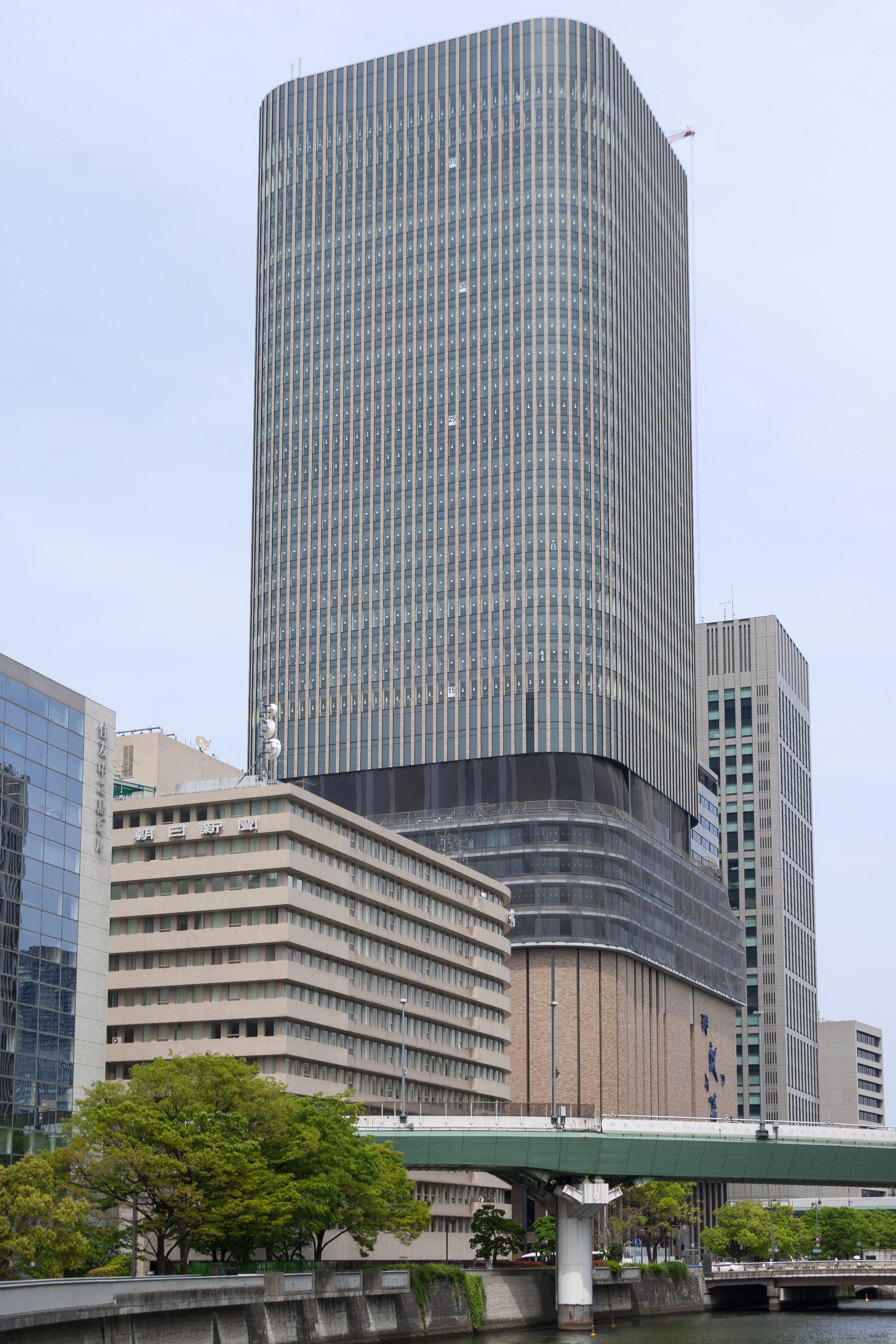
Nakanoshima Festival Tower East Asahi Shimbun Osaka Head Office is on the 9th to the 12th floors.

The Asahi Shimbun (朝日新聞; IPA: [asaçi ɕiꜜmbɯɴ], lit. 'morning sun newspaper') is a Japanese daily newspaper founded in 1879. It is one of the oldest newspapers in Japan and Asia, and is considered a newspaper of record for Japan.

The Asahi Shimbun is one of the five largest newspapers in Japan along with the Yomiuri Shimbun, the Mainichi Shimbun, the Nihon Keizai Shimbun and Chunichi Shimbun. The newspaper's circulation, which was 3.26 million for its morning edition and 892,295 for its evening edition as of June 2025, was second behind that of the Yomiuri Shimbun. By print circulation, it is the second largest newspaper in the world behind the Yomiuri, though its digital size trails that of many global newspapers including The New York Times.

Its publisher, The Asahi Shimbun Company, is a media conglomerate with its registered headquarters in Osaka. It is a privately held family business with ownership and control remaining with the founding Murayama and Ueno families. According to the Reuters Institute Digital Report 2018, public trust in the Asahi Shimbun is the lowest among Japan's major dailies, though confidence is declining in all the major newspapers.

== History ==
=== Early years ===
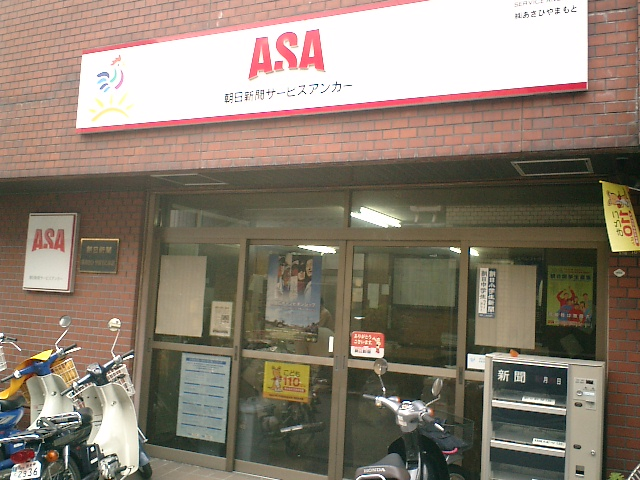
ASA newspaper delivery agent

One of Japan's oldest and largest national daily newspapers, the Asahi Shimbun began publication in Osaka on 25 January 1879 as a small-print, four-page illustrated paper that sold for one sen (a hundredth of a yen) a copy, and had a circulation of approximately 3,000 copies. The three founding officers of a staff of twenty were Kimura Noboru (company president), Murayama Ryōhei (owner), and Tsuda Tei (managing editor). The company's first premises were at Minami-dōri, Edobori in Osaka. On 13 September of the same year, Asahi printed its first editorial.

In 1881, the Asahi adopted an all-news format, and enlisted Ueno Riichi as co-owner. From 1882, Asahi began to receive financial support from the Government and Mitsui, and hardened the management base. Then, under the leadership of Ueno, whose brother was one of the Mitsui managers, and Murayama, the Asahi began its steady ascent to national prominence. On 10 July 1888, the first issue of the Tokyo Asahi Shimbun was published from the Tokyo office at Motosukiyachō, Kyōbashi. The first issue was numbered No. 1,076 as it was a continuation of three small papers: Jiyū no Tomoshibi, Tomoshibi Shimbun and Mesamashi Shimbun.

On 1 April 1907, the renowned writer Natsume Sōseki, then 41, resigned his teaching positions at Tokyo Imperial University, now Tokyo University, to join the Tokyo Asahi Shimbun. This was soon after the publication of his novels Wagahai wa Neko de Aru (I Am a Cat) and Botchan, which made him the center of literary attention.

On 1 October 1908, Osaka Asahi Shimbun and Tokyo Asahi Shimbun were merged into a single unified corporation, Asahi Shimbun Gōshi Kaisha, with a capitalization of approximately 600,000 yen.

In 1918, because of its critical stance towards Terauchi Masatake's cabinet during the Rice Riots, government authorities suppressed an article in the Osaka Asahi, leading to a softening of its liberal views, and the resignation of many of its staff reporters in protest.

Indeed, the newspaper's liberal position led to its vandalization during the February 26 Incident of 1936, as well as repeated attacks from ultranationalists throughout this period (and for that matter, throughout its history).

=== Toward and during the war ===
From the latter half of the 1930s, Asahi ardently supported Prime Minister Fumimaro Konoe's wartime government (called Konoe Shin Taisei, or Konoe's New Political Order) and criticized capitalism harshly under Taketora Ogata, the Editor in Chief of Asahi Shimbun. Influential editorial writers of Asahi such as Shintarō Ryū, Hiroo Sassa, and Hotsumi Ozaki (an informant for the famous spy Richard Sorge) were the center members of the Shōwa Kenkyūkai, which was a political think tank for Konoe.

Ogata was one of the leading members of the Genyōsha which had been formed in 1881 by Tōyama Mitsuru. The Genyōsha was an ultranationalist group of organized crime figures and those with far right-wing political beliefs. Kōki Hirota, who was later hanged as a Class A war criminal, was also a leading member of the Genyōsha and one of Ogata's best friends. Hirota was the chairman of Tōyama's funeral committee, and Ogata was the vice-chairman.

Ryū, who had been a Marxist economist of the Ōhara Institute for Social Research before he entered Asahi, advocated centrally planned economies in his Nihon Keizai no Saihensei (Reorganization of Japanese Economies. 1939). And Sassa, a son of ultranationalistic politician Sassa Tomofusa, joined hands with far-right generals (they were called Kōdōha or Imperial Way Faction) and terrorists who had assassinated Junnosuke Inoue (ex–Minister of Finance), Baron Dan Takuma (chairman of the board of directors of the Mitsui zaibatsu) and Prime Minister Inukai Tsuyoshi to support Konoe. In 1944, they attempted assassination of Prime Minister Hideki Tōjō (one of the leaders of Tōseiha or Control Group which conflicted with Kōdōha in the Japanese Army).

On 9 April 1937, the Kamikaze, a Mitsubishi aircraft sponsored by the Asahi Shimbun company and flown by Masaaki Iinuma, arrived in London, to the astonishment of the Western world. It was the first Japanese-built aircraft to fly to Europe.

On 1 September 1940, the Osaka Asahi Shimbun and the Tokyo Asahi Shimbun unified their names into the Asahi Shimbun.

On 1 January 1943, the publication of the Asahi Shimbun was stopped by the government after the newspaper published a critical essay contributed by Seigō Nakano, who was also one of the leading members of the Genyōsha and Ogata's best friend.

On 27 December 1943, Nagataka Murayama, a son-in-law of Murayama Ryōhei and the President of Asahi, removed Ogata from the Editor in Chief and relegated him to the Vice President to hold absolute power in Asahi.

On 22 July 1944, Ogata, Vice President of Asahi, became a Minister without Portfolio and the President of Cabinet Intelligence Agency in Kuniaki Koiso's cabinet.

On 7 April 1945, Hiroshi Shimomura, former Vice President of Asahi, became the Minister without Portfolio and the President of Cabinet Intelligence Agency in Kantarō Suzuki's cabinet.

On 17 August 1945, Ogata became the Minister without Portfolio and the Chief Cabinet Secretary and the President of Cabinet Intelligence Agency in Prince Higashikuni's cabinet.

=== After the war ===
On 5 November 1945, as a way of assuming responsibility for compromising the newspaper's principles during the war, the Asahi Shimbun's president and senior executives resigned en masse.

On 21 November 1946, the newspaper adopted the modern kana usage system (shin kanazukai).

On 30 November 1949, the Asahi Shimbun started to publish the serialized cartoon strip Sazae-san by Machiko Hasegawa. This was a landmark cartoon in Japan's postwar era.

Between 1954 and 1971, Asahi Shimbun published a glossy, large-format annual in English entitled This is Japan.

Between April and May 1989, the paper reported that a coral reef near Okinawa was defaced by "すさんだ心根の日本人" (a man with a Japanese dissolute mind). It later turned to be a report in which the reporter himself defaced the coral reef. This incident was called ja:朝日新聞珊瑚記事捏造事件 (the Asahi Shimbun coral article hoax incident)., and the president resigned to take responsibility for it.

On 26 June 2007, Yoichi Funabashi was named the third editor-in-chief of Asahi Shimbun.

Chieko Akaishi, an activist for single mothers, became a part of the editorial board.

Shōichi Ueno, the newspaper's co-owner since 1997, died on 29 February 2016.

While Shin-ichi Hakojima was CEO, a partnership with the International Herald Tribune led to the publication of an English-language newspaper, the International Herald Tribune/Asahi Shimbun. It continued from April 2001 until February 2011. It replaced Asahi's previous English-language daily, the Asahi Evening News. In 2010, this partnership was dissolved due to unprofitability and the Asahi Shimbun now operates the Asia & Japan Watch online portal for English readers. The Tribune (now known as The International New York Times) cooperates with Asahi on Aera English, a glossy magazine for English learners.

== Political stance ==
The Asahi Shimbun is considered left-leaning and has been called "the intellectual flagship of Japan's political left," with a long tradition of reporting on big political scandals more often than its conservative counterparts. The paper is considered a newspaper of record in Japan.

The Asahi Shimbun is critical of right-wing Japanese nationalism and shows progressive tendencies in cultural and diplomatic issues, but has a neoliberal tendency economically. The latter contrasts with Mainichi Shimbun's relatively Keynesian economic viewpoint. However, in general evaluation, the Asahi Shimbun seems to have a tone representing Japanese social-liberals (left-liberals).

The Asahi has called for the upholding of Japan's postwar Constitution and particularly Article 9, which bars the use of war to resolve disputes. The newspaper has also opposed changes in interpretation of the anti-war provision, including one made in 2014 that allowed the Japan Self-Defense Forces to come to the aid of an ally under attack—the so-called right of collective self-defense.

While the Asahi retracted articles based on the discredited testimony of Seiji Yoshida, its editorial position still recognizes the existence of the comfort women as Korean and other women from Japan's conquered territories during World War II who were coerced into prostitution to serve the Japanese military.

According to the Digital News Report from the Reuters Institute for the Study of Journalism in 2018, the Asahi earned the lowest trust among the five largest newspapers in Japan (5.35, compared to 5.68 of Sankei Shimbun). Further analysis from the institute indicated the low trust against the Asahi is due to high distrust because of strong criticism from political right in Japan.

== Controversies ==
=== Comfort women ===
In August 2014, the newspaper retracted the discredited testimonies of Seiji Yoshida about the forcible recruitment of comfort women that were cited in several articles published by the Asahi and other major Japanese newspapers in the 1980s and 1990s. The paper drew ire from conservative media who, along with Abe's government, criticized it for damaging Japan's reputation abroad, some leveraging on this episode to imply that sexual slavery itself was a fabrication. The Asahi newspaper reaffirmed in its retracting article that "the fact that women were coerced into being sexual partners for Japanese soldiers cannot be erased" but also confirmed "No official documents were found that directly showed forcible taking away by the military on the Korean Peninsula and Taiwan, where the people living there were made 'subjects' of the Japanese Empire under Japanese colonial rule. Prostitution agents were prevalent due to the poverty and patriarchal family system. For that reason, even if the military was not directly involved, it is said it was possible to gather many women through such methods as work-related scams and human trafficking."

=== Fukushima Daiichi nuclear disaster ===
Following the March 2011 Fukushima Daiichi nuclear disaster, the Asahi and other newspapers faced growing public criticism for adhering too closely to the government narrative during their reporting of the disaster. In response, the Asahi strengthened its investigative reporting unit, called the Tokubetsu Hodobu, or Special Reports Section, to take a more independent approach to its coverage. The section won many awards, including the Japan Newspaper Publishers and Editors Association Award in 2012 and again in 2013.

In May 2014, the section published what it hoped would be its biggest scoop yet: a copy of the firsthand account of the disaster given by Masao Yoshida, who was the manager of the Fukushima Daiichi power plant when the triple meltdown occurred; the testimony, recorded by government investigators, had been kept hidden from public view. In the testimony, Yoshida said that 90% of the plant's employees had left the plant at the height of the crisis despite him having given instructions for them to remain. He also testified that he believed his instructions had simply not reached the employees in the chaos of the disaster. However, controversy erupted over the Asahi story, and particularly the headline, which stated: “Workers Evacuated, Violating Plant Manager Orders." The newspaper came under intense criticism for slandering the workers by implying that they had fled the plant due to cowardice, when many in Japan had come to see Yoshida and plant workers as heroes who had prevented a worse disaster at the plant.

Japanese journalist Ryusho Kadota, who have previously interviewed Yoshida and plant workers, was one of the first to criticize the Asahi for mischaracterizing the evacuation. The Asahi at first defended its story, demanding that Kadota's publisher apologize and issue a correction. However, in August, the Yomiuri Shimbun, Sankei Shimbun, Kyodo News and NHK all acquired the same testimony, apparently from the government, and used it not to shed light on the disaster, but to attack the Asahi. In mid-September, facing intense criticism from other media and the government of Prime Minister Shinzo Abe for its Fukushima coverage and also its retractions of the comfort women stories, the Asahi suddenly announced that the Yoshida story had been mistaken and retracted it. The president of the Asahi, Tadakazu Kimura, a supporter of the investigative section, resigned to take responsibility.

The reporters and editors responsible for the story were punished, and the Special Reports Section reduced in size, with many of its members reassigned elsewhere in the paper. Two of the top reporters later quit to found a non-profit journalism organization that is one of the first in Japan dedicated to investigative journalism, the Waseda Chronicle, later renamed to Tokyo Investigative Newsroom Tansa. The Asahi's investigative section was told to avoid coverage of the Fukushima disaster, and has largely faded from view.

=== Coral article fabrication ===
In the evening edition of April 20, 1989, an article described how the world's largest Azami coral in a sea area designated as a natural environment conservation area in Okinawa was damaged, with the initial "KY" scratched on the coral. Along with a color photograph of the scratched coral, the article lamented the decline in Japanese morals. Later, investigations by local divers who had doubts about the article proved that the Asahi photographer himself made the scratches to forge a newspaper article. Taking responsibility, the president (at that time) Toichiro Hitotsuyanagi was forced to resign. This was also known as the KY case.

=== Ritsu Ito interview report ===
On 27 September 1950, a solo interview with a Japanese Communist Party executive in hiding, Ritsu Ito, was posted. Later it was revealed that this was forged by the Asahi reporter in charge.

== Asahi Shimbun Asia Network ==
The Asahi Shimbun Asia Network (AAN) is a think tank that aims to promote information exchange in Asia and provide opportunities for scholars, researchers and journalists to share their ideas on pressing themes in Asia. It was established in 1999. Their work includes annual international symposia and the publication of research reports. In 2003, Gong Ro Myung was chosen as the new president of AAN.

Symposia have included:

- 2008 Human Mobility and Regional Integration in Asia: The Current Situation of Higher Education and Labor Market and Policy Response

Reports include such titles as:

- "Cooperative Security in Northeast Asia". 2000.
- "New Age of Migration in Asia". 2001.
- Hajime, Izumi (8 July 2010). "Condemn but Converse: A Japan-U.S.-R.O.K. Response to North Korea". Archived from the original on 17 July 2010.

== Asahi Prize ==
Established in 1929, the Asahi Prize is a prize awarded by the newspaper, since 1992 by the Asahi Shimbun Foundation, for achievements in scholarship or the arts that has made a lasting contribution to Japanese culture or society.

== Reproductions of past issues ==
Reproductions of past issues of the Asahi Shimbun are available in three major forms; as CD-ROMs, as microfilm, and as shukusatsuban (縮刷版, literally, "reduced-sized print editions"). Shukusatsuban is a technology popularized by Asahi Shimbun in the 1930s as a way to compress and archive newspapers by reducing the size of the print to fit multiple pages of a daily newspaper onto one page. Shukusatsuban are geared towards libraries and archives, and are usually organized and released by month. These resources are available at many leading research universities throughout the world (usually universities with reputable Japanese studies programs).

The Asahi Shimbun has a CD-ROM database consisting of an index of headlines and sub-headlines from the years 1945–1999. A much more expensive full-text searchable database is available only at the Harvard-Yenching Library at Harvard University, which notably includes advertisements in its index. Researchers using other university libraries would probably have to first use the CD-ROM index, and then look into the microfilm or shukusatsuban versions. Microfilm versions are available from 1888; shukusatsuban versions are available from 1931. Issues of the Asahi Shimbun printed since August 1984 are available through Lexis-Nexis Academic.

== Offices ==
- Osaka Head Office (registered headquarters): Nakanoshima Festival Tower East, 3-18, Nakanoshima Nichome, Kita-ku, Osaka
- Tokyo Head Office: 3-2, Tsukiji Gochome, Chūō, Tokyo
  - Hokkaidō Office: 1-1, Kita-Nijo-nishi Itchome, Chūō-ku, Sapporo
- Nagoya Head Office: 3-3, Sakae Itchome, Naka-ku, Nagoya
- West Head Office: Riverwalk Kitakyushu, 1-1, Muromachi Itchome, Kokura Kita-ku, Kitakyushu
  - Fukuoka Office: 1-1, Hakata Ekimae Nichome, Hakata-ku, Fukuoka
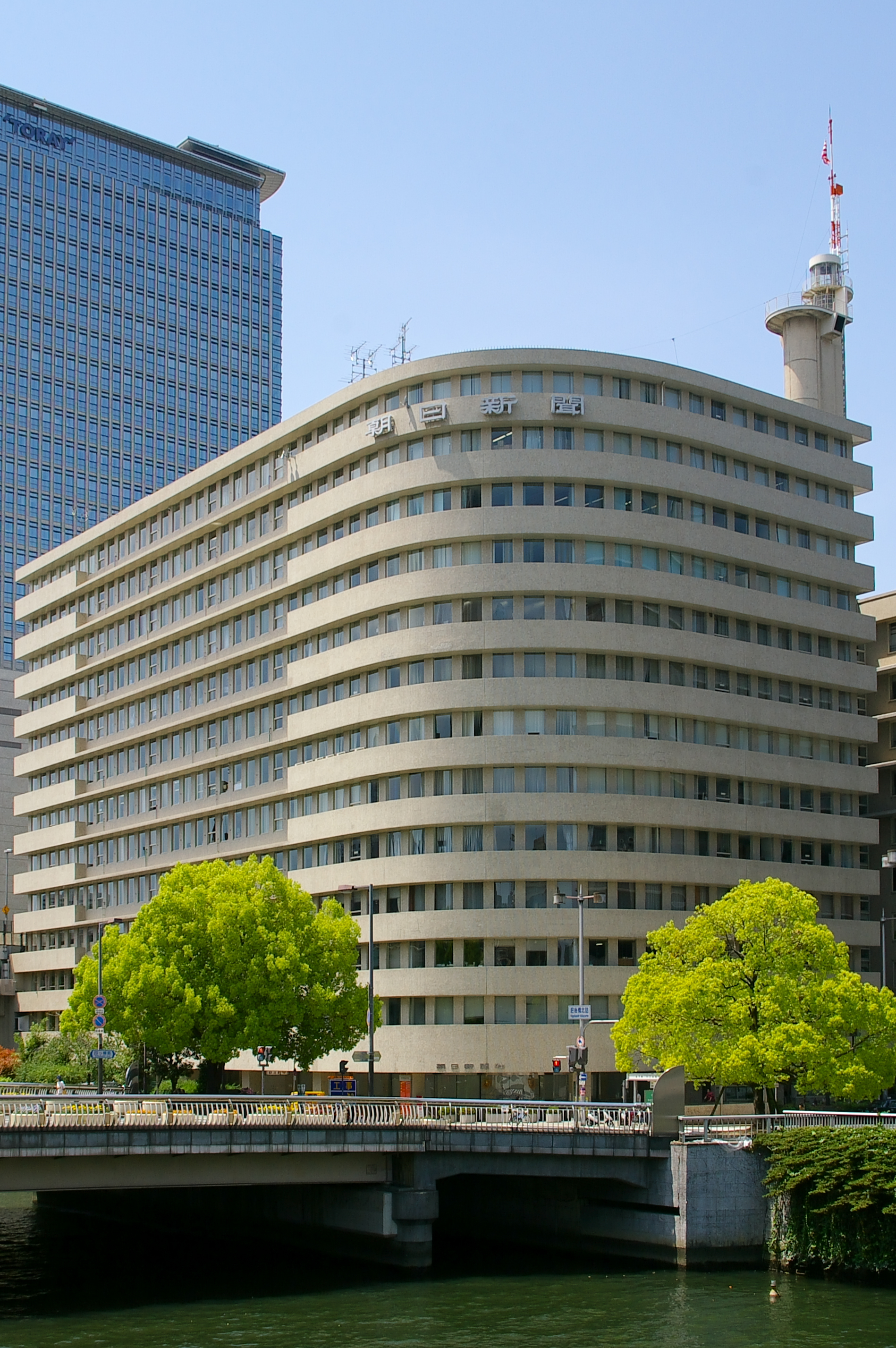
Asahi Shimbun Building (2006)

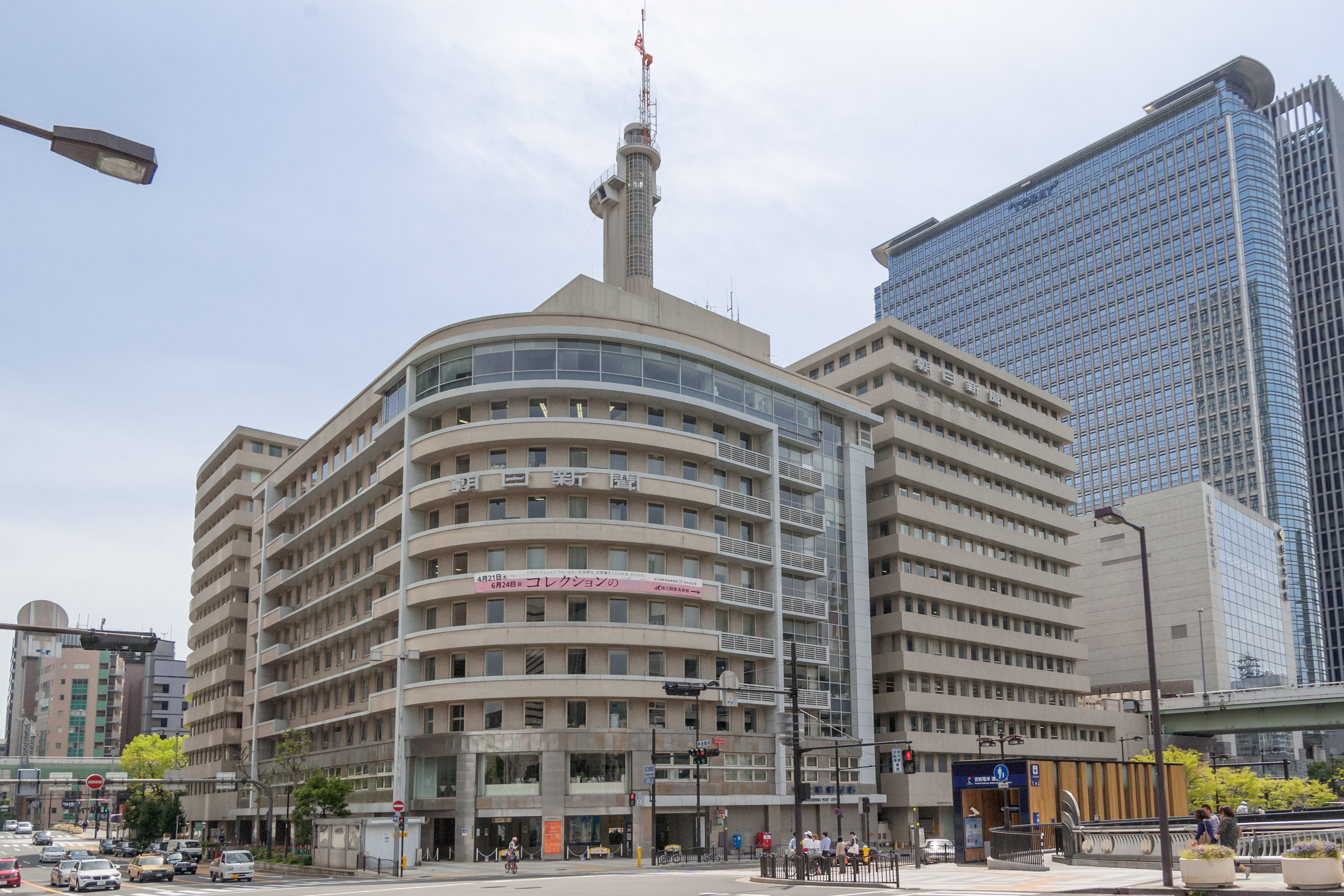
Asahi Shimbun Building and Osaka Asahi Building (2012)

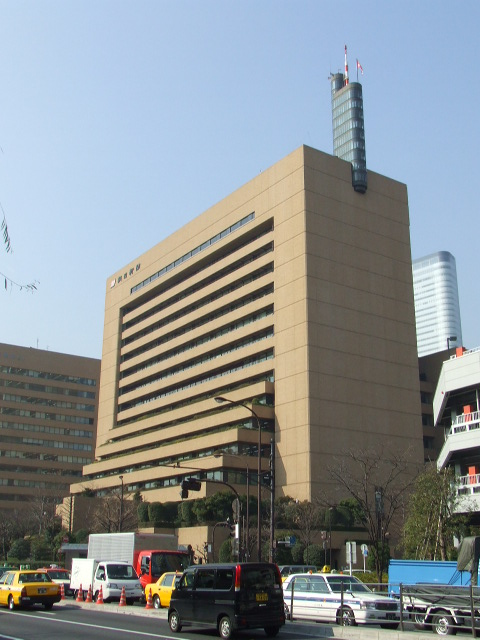
Asahi Shimbun Tokyo Head Office

== Sports sponsorship ==
Colored modern logo of Asahi Shimbun

Asahi Shimbun was the official supporter for several Asian Football Confederation's competitions, most recently the 2019 AFC Asian Cup. They used to support both of AFC's club competitions; the AFC Champions League and AFC Cup until 2018 season. They were official sponsors of the 2002 FIFA World Cup.

== Group companies ==
- Nikkan Sports
- Kanagawa Shimbun
- International Herald Tribune/The Asahi Shimbun (Herald-Asahi, from the Japanese Wikipedia)
- Asahi Shimbun Publications (formerly Asahi Sonorama)
- TV Asahi Holdings (cross-shareholder; largest single stockholder in the newspaper)
- Asahi Broadcasting Corporation (cross-shareholder)
- Nagoya Broadcasting Network (cross-shareholder)
- All-Nippon News Network
- TV Asahi Channel (pay TV channels via CS)
- Asahi Shimbun Foundation
- FM OSAKA
- BuzzFeed Japan
- 4X
  - CNET Japan
  - CNN Japan
  - ZDNET Japan

== See also ==
- Media of Japan
- Asahi characters
- Rising Sun Flag
- Kuri-chan, a yonkoma manga which ran in the newspaper from 1951 to 1965
- Tensei Jingo
