= Anarchism in Taiwan =

Anarchism in Taiwan first developed out of the anti-imperialist resistance to the Empire of Japan, when a number of young Taiwanese nationalists were exposed to anarchism during their studies abroad. Influenced by the anarchist movements in China and Japan, and in close cooperation with a number of Korean anarchists, the Taiwanese anarchist movement reached its height during the 1920s, before being suppressed by 1931.

== History ==
=== Under Japanese occupation ===
Following the First Sino-Japanese War, the island of Taiwan was ceded by the Qing dynasty to the Empire of Japan. Attempts to form an independent Republic of Formosa were defeated by the Japanese invasion, which brought the island under Imperial rule. In the wake of the occupation, Taiwanese social movements started to focus on calls for democracy and self-determination, with more radical and revolutionary ideas also beginning to take shape. Following the events of the Russian Revolution and with the outbreak of the May Fourth Movement in the Republic of China, many young Taiwanese nationalists experienced a sharp turn towards left-wing politics, with a number picking up on the ideas of anarchism and communism during their studies in Tokyo or Beijing.

In 1919, when the Japanese colonial government of Den Kenjirō started to implement a policy of cultural assimilation in Taiwan, the Taiwanese anarchist Yu Gingfang led an uprising against imperial rule, but it was put down. In Beijing, where the Chinese anarchist movement was rising to prominence, the Taiwanese anarchist Fan Benliang founded the "New Taiwanese Anarchist Society" and the anarchist newspaper New Taiwan.

During the early 1920s, anarchist and communist ideas took hold within the youth faction of the Taiwanese Cultural Association. On 30 July 1923, the Taipei Youth Association was founded, and by December 1926, the organization had expanded into the Taiwan Black Youth League. This organization used the Cultural Association as a platform to promote anarchist ideas publicly, even openly opposed the Petition Movement for the Establishment of a Taiwanese Parliament. The Black Youth League organized hundreds of public meetings and lectures that were attended in the thousands, with one meeting that was called in support of the Korean independence movement being attended by prominent Japanese anarchists such as Iwasa Sakutarō and Hatta Shūzō. On January 2, 1927, the Black Youth League began to take steps to organize trade unions in Taiwan, but on January 31, the organization was discovered by Japanese police. In February 1927, the Black Youth League was banned and its members were subjected to mass arrests, with many being sentenced to months in prison. In November 1929, the anarcho-syndicalist Taiwanese Workers' Mutual Aid Association was established by Chang Weixan. But by August 1931, a number of its members were charged with illegally possessing weaponry and another wave of mass arrests followed.

Meanwhile, in mainland China, many Taiwanese anarchists found themselves collaborating with Korean anarchists due to their shared anti-imperialism, notably together establishing the Eastern Anarchist Federation (EAF) in Shanghai. The Korean anarchist leader Sin Chaeho even collaborated with the Taiwanese anarchist Lin Bingwen in an attempt to forge banknotes for funding the EAF's activities, but they were both arrested by the Japanese authorities in Taiwan and would later die in prison. The EAF also established anarchist schools in Quanzhou, which included two Taiwanese teachers in the faculty at the Dawn Advance Middle School.

The suppression of the Taiwanese anarchist and communist movements in 1931 marked the beginning of Japan's turn towards military dictatorship, culminating in the Pacific War, when the Empire of Japan was finally defeated by the Allies. Taiwan was subsequently retroceded back to the Republic of China, and when the Kuomintang was defeated in the Chinese Civil War, the nationalist government retreated to Taiwan. Among those that fled to Taiwan were a number of Chinese anarchists, two of which included the anarchist elders Wu Zhihui and Li Shizeng, supporters of Chiang Kai-shek's Nationalist government. The new Taiwanese government subsequently oversaw a "White Terror" against left-wing political dissidents, implementing martial law that lasted until the end of the Cold War.

=== 21st century ===
Since democratization, there has been a renewed interest of anarchism in Taiwan. In 2003, the Atayal community of Smangus adopted a form of Christian anarchist organization, where community assets are managed cooperatively by the villagers. In 2016, the newly elected President Tsai Ing-wen recruited Audrey Tang, a self-described "conservative anarchist", to join the Democratic Progressive Party's government as a member of the Executive Yuan. As a government minister, Tang has since voiced her support for e-democracy and radical transparency in Taiwanese politics.

== See also ==
- Category:Taiwanese anarchists
- List of anarchist movements by region
- Ruin Academy
- Squatting in Taiwan
- Taiwan independence Left
