= Zenkoku Jiren =

Japanese trade union federation (1926–1936)

All-Japan Libertarian Federation of Labour Unions
- 全国労働組合自由連合会
- Abbreviation: Zenkoku Jiren
- Established: 24 May 1926; 100 years ago
- Dissolved: 1936; 90 years ago
- Type: National trade union federation
- Headquarters: Tokyo
- Location: Japan
- Members: 16,300 (1931)
- De facto leaders: Hatta Shūzō (1928–1933); Aizawa Hisao (1933–1935)
- Main organ: Jiyū Rengō Shinbun
- Secessions: Nihon Jikyō (1929–1934)

The All-Japan Libertarian Federation of Labour Unions (全国労働組合自由連合会, Zenkoku Rōdō Kumiai Jiyū Rengō-kai) (Note: Also translated as the All-Japanese Libertarian Federation of Trade Unions, National Free Federation of Trade Unions, National Libertarian Federation of Labour Unions, or the Free General Association of Trade Unions.), commonly abbreviated as Zenkoku Jiren (全国自連), was a Japanese trade union federation. Its roots lay in the anarcho-syndicalist movement, which joined nascent Japanese labour unions in an attempt to influence them towards decentralisation. When the anarchists came into conflict with the reformist and Bolshevik tendencies of the trade union movement, initial attempts to collaborate eventually gave way to a split in the trade union federation Sōdōmei. In May 1926, Japanese anarcho-syndicalists established Zenkoku Jiren, which brought together unions from throughout the country. It developed a close working relationship with Kokuren, an anarchist political organisation which supplied the unions with many of their most militant members.

Zenkoku Jiren quickly became involved in a series of strike actions and agitated against Japanese intervention in the Chinese Civil War. The organisation's participation in a congress of the Soviet-aligned Pan-Pacific Trade Union Secretariat led to a split between its syndicalist and pure anarchist factions, which disagreed on the issues of industrialisation, class conflict and the structure of a post-capitalist society. Conflict between the two factions came to a head at the organisation's second conference, during which Hatta Shūzō's pure anarchist faction took control of Zenkoku Jiren and expelled its anarcho-syndicalist membership. Under pure anarchist control, the organisation orientated itself away from workplace struggles and placed increasing emphasis on rural agitation.

Following the 1931 Japanese invasion of Manchuria, members of Zenkoku Jiren began calling for a rapprochement with anarcho-syndicalism, with a view towards forming an anti-fascist united front against the rise of Japanese militarism. Under the direction of Aizawa Hisao, the organisation moved closer towards anarcho-syndicalism, while maintaining much of its pure anarchist outlook. By 1934, the organisation reunified with the anarcho-syndicalist splinter organisation Nihon Jikyō, but its membership numbers declined in the face of sustained political repression. After Aizawa unsuccessfully attempted to rob a bank, Japanese police carried out mass arrests against the anarchist movement, forcing Zenkoku Jiren to disband. Its International Workers' Day demonstration in 1935 would be the last in the history of pre-war Japan.

== Background ==
Labour unions in Japan were effectively outlawed in 1900, following the introduction of the public peace police law. The first trade union organisation to organise legally was the Friendship Society (Japanese: 友愛会, romanized: Yūaikai), a class collaborationist federation established in 1912 by Suzuki Bunji. The Japanese entry into World War I brought with it a period of economic growth, as well as a rise in inflation, which exacerbated economic inequality. Industrial disputes became increasingly more common in Japan, despite the law officially prohibiting strike actions. Following the end of the war, the Yūaikai rapidly grew in size and received support from some in the Japanese anarchist movement, before it reorganised into the Japanese General Federation of Labour (Japanese: 総同盟, romanized: Sōdōmei).

At the time, the Japanese trade union movement was largely reformist. But following the Russian Revolution, supporters of the Bolsheviks sought to infiltrate the trade unions and use them to win political power for the nascent Japanese Communist Party (JCP). Japanese anarchists were also enthusiastic about the newly-established trade union movement and began to focus much of their activities on influencing the unions, leading to the growth of anarcho-syndicalism in the country. The Bolsheviks and anarchists disagreed over how to structure the trade union movement, with the former attempting to centralise power, while the latter advocated for decentralisation.

Anarchist trade unions were largely organised among printers. By 1919, anarchists had taken over the printers' union Shinyūkai and established another, Seishinkai, to organise workers in the Tokyo newspaper industry. Seeking to foster collaboration between the anarcho-syndicalist and Bolshevik trade unions, the Sōdōmei, Shinyūkai and Seishinkai joined together into the Labour Union Alliance on 16 May 1920. But successive attempts to hold a conference to unify anarchists, Bolsheviks and reformists into a single organisation were broken up by police.

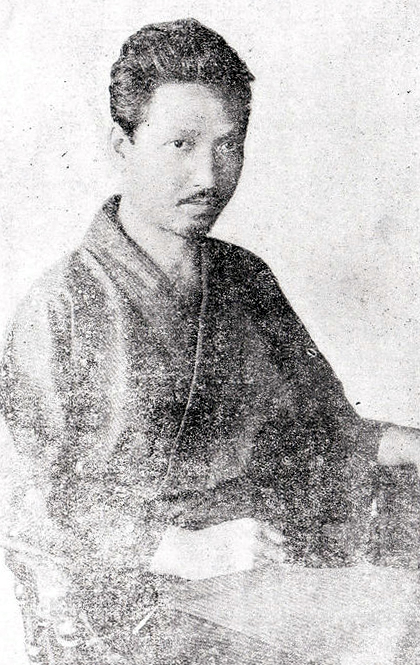
Ōsugi Sakae, the leading organiser of the early Japanese anarcho-syndicalist movement

As political repression against the movement heightened, in early 1921, many anarcho-syndicalists began to turn against collaboration with the Bolsheviks. Conflicts between the anarchist members and reformist leadership of the Sōdōmei also came to a head in May 1921, when the anarchists sought to use International Workers' Day to force a confrontation the police. On 4 June 1921, the reformist leadership withdrew the Sōdōmei from the Labour Union Alliance.

In September 1922, a last attempt was made to establish a national trade union federation, with a conference in Osaka aiming to establish an All-Japan General Federation of Labour Unions, but the divisions between the anarchists, Bolsheviks and reformists were too deep to reconcile. Following the conference, 20 anarchist trade unions – representing engineers, labourers, printers, shipbuilders, telecommunication workers, watchmakers and workers from various other economic sectors – published a manifesto in which they called on workers to help them establish a decentralised trade union federation. Following the 1923 Great Kantō earthquake, military police murdered the anarcho-syndicalist movement's leading organiser Ōsugi Sakae and his partner Itō Noe.

== Establishment ==
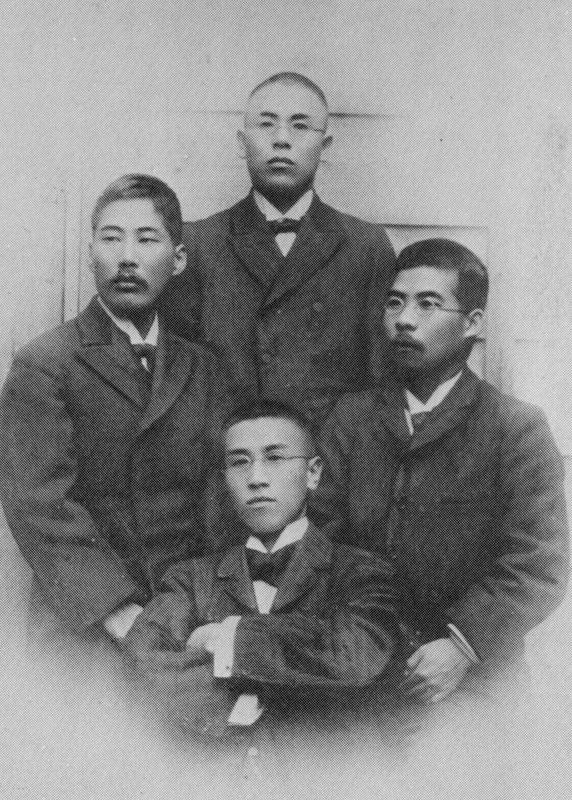
Ishikawa Sanshirō (bottom) and other prominent Japanese anarchists of the early 20th century

By the mid-1920s, relations between the three factions of the Japanese labour movement had broken down and the period of collaboration was brought to an end. Many anarchists quit the Sōdōmei, leaving its 20,000 members and 35 tade unions in the hands of the reformist leadership. In 1923, the anarchist Shinyūkai and Seishinkai unions merged together into a single printers' union, which counted 3,850 members in total. In 1925, the Bolsheviks likewise split from the Sōdōmei and established the Japanese Labour Union Council, which counted 12,500 members between 32 trade unions. On 24 May 1926, 400 anarcho-syndicalist delegates attended a conference in Asakusa, where they established the All-Japan Libertarian Federation of Labour Unions (Japanese: 全国労働組合自由連合会, romanized: Zenkoku Rōdō Kumiai Jiyū Rengō-kai), commonly abbreviated as Zenkoku Jiren. Ishikawa Sanshirō was among the founding members.

Zenkoku Jiren brought together 25 trade unions, which represented 8,372 members between them. Regional trade union federations were established in Chūgoku, Hokkaido, Kansai and Kantō. It also included individual trade unions which represented printworkers, mechanics, confectioners, textile workers and tenant farmers, as well as assorted workers from other industrial sectors. The organisation was decentralised, with its only central body consisting of a four-person "liaison committee". Zenkoku Jiren was the smallest of the three trade union federations at the time.

The founding conference in May 1926 adopted a number of resolutions for the new organisation. It was completely opposed to politics, rejecting any affiliation between trade unions and political parties. It also took a hostile line against trade unions which it considered to be a threat to working-class interests, and called for its activists to forcibly break up their meetings. As most Japanese workers were not organised into trade unions, Zenkoku Jiren specifically sought to organise these unaffiliated workers and convince them of libertarian syndicalist practices. Zenkoku Jiren demanded numerous reforms, including the establishment of the eight-hour working day, measures to curb seasonal unemployment among day labourers and the abolition of laws it considered to be oppressive. It also resolved to establish industrial unions, to persuade independent unions to join the federation, and to eventually create a network of libertarian labour unions in East Asia.

In the federation's four-point programme, adopted by the conference, it advocated for: the unity of industrial workers and tenant farmers in class conflict against the ruling class; a focus on industrial action rather than politics; a decentralised economy based on a federation of industries, as opposed to authoritarian centralisation; and proletarian internationalism as a means to counter imperialism and expansionism. Its ultimate aim was to establish a free association of producers. The programme drew inspiration from the 1906 Charter of Amiens, in which the French General Confederation of Labour (CGT) had declared its commitment to class conflict and rejection of politics.

The programme also came with a code of conduct, which emphasised that unions affiliated with Zenkoku Jiren would be operationally autonomous and free to manage their own affairs as they saw fit. This clause proved attractive to many unions, causing Zenkoku Jiren to see an immediate surge in affiliations. Among the new members were: employees of Hitachi; unions in Niigata and Asahikawa; and unions in the Tokyo newspaper and gas industries. As Zenkoku Jiren established a strong presence in large factories and industrial centres, it formed several new industrial unions, including national federations of printers and metalworkers. Zenkoku Jiren also attracted a number of members of Kokuren, an anarchist political organisation, and the relationship between the two took a similar shape to the National Confederation of Labour (CNT) and the Iberian Anarchist Federation (FAI) in Spain. Militants of the Kokuren gained a reputation as the most "battle-hardened" of Zenkoku Jiren members and formed a militant minority within it. Before the end of 1926, Zenkoku Jiren claimed to have over 15,000 members.

== Early activities ==
On 5 June 1926, Zenkoku Jiren began publishing the newspaper Jiyū Rengō (Japanese: 自由連合; English: Libertarian Federation). (Note: In September 1928, the newspaper was renamed to Jiyū Rengō Shinbun. (Japanese: 自由連合新聞; English: Libertarian Federation Newspaper).) The paper carried a range of different perspectives on anarchist theory and strategy, with its second issue publishing an article about the founder of anarcho-syndicalism Fernand Pelloutier and its ninth and tenth issues carrying reports about the nascent Revolutionary Syndicalist General Confederation of Labour (CGT-SR). Alongside works about syndicalism, it also carried articles from an anti-industrialist tendency. In the seventh issue, a Tokyo printworker called for workers to abandon urban industrial centres and return to the land. The author concluded that cities had an inherently exploitative relationship with rural villages, and that tenant farmers were thus exploited by both their landlords and by city dwellers who lived off their produce. The paper also carried some of the most important works by anarchist theorist Hatta Shūzō, who himself focused much of his attention on organising the peasantry. Hatta believed that trade unions should take action according to anarchist methods, and should remain in keeping with anarchist philosophy.

During the first year and a half of the organisation's existence, Zenkoku Jiren was involved in several industrial disputes. By continuously organising trade unions and carrying out strike actions, it gained the adherence of many rank-and-file trade unionists. In June 1926, workers at a Hitachi factory in Kameido established a trade union, which affiliated itself to Zenkoku Jiren. In September of that year, the union went on strike, prompting militants of the Kokuren to firebomb the mansion of the company's president Namihei Odaira. During the course of that year, there were around 70 industrial disputes by printworkers affiliated with Zenkoku Jiren. Printworkers' strikes continued into the following year, with 36 disputes taking place during the first half of the year. Articles in Jiyū Rengō discussed the best tactics to make use of during industrial disputes and argued against any centralisation of union leadership during such disputes. Together with the Kokuren, the Zekoku Jiren campaigned against the introduction of "workers' record books", which printing companies intended to use to record data about individual workers throughout their career, including their behaviour, productivity and reasons for leaving previous jobs.

In May 1927, prime minister Tanaka Giichi dispatched the Imperial Japanese Army to occupy Shandong and block the advance of Chiang Kai-shek's Northern Expedition. Zenkoku Jiren and Kokuren responded by organising a joint campaign against Japanese intervention in China. Fearing the outbreak of war, Zenkoku Jiren sent delegates to Hankou to attend the inaugural conference of the Pan-Pacific Trade Union Secretariat, which was held to discuss the prevention of a war and greater trade union cooperation in the Asia-Pacific region. When the delegates arrived in Guangdong, local Chinese anarchists informed them that the conference had been organised by the Soviet-backed Red International of Trade Unions (RITU) and that delegates from the Japanese Communist Party (JCP) would be in attendance. They nevertheless decided to continue on to attend the conference, where they were marginalised by the large Soviet-backed presence. Zenkoku Jiren reported that their delegates were only allowed one vote between them, that their motions calling for the release of Sacco and Vanzetti and prison abolition were dismissed, and that the JCP had pressured them into dropping their opposition to party politics. Attendance of the Hankou congress was sharply criticised by members of Kokuren, who accused anarcho-syndicalist elements within Zenkoku Jiren (including their congressional delegate Utagawa Noboru) of opportunism. This caused rising tensions between the anarcho-syndicalists and pure anarchist factions in both organisations.

== Split ==
=== Pure anarchists vs anarcho-syndicalists ===
In contrast to the anarcho-syndicalists of Zenkoku Jiren, the pure anarchist faction was highly critical of industrialism and called instead for a complete break from capitalist industrialisation. They believed that the division of labour, which required a hierarchy of management and deprived workers of collective responsibility, was incompatible with anarchist communism. The ultimate aim of the pure anarchists in Zenkoku Jiren was to roll back industrialisation and urbanisation and to establish a network of self-sufficient, autonomous communes, each with a balance of agriculture and small-scale industry.

Pure anarchists such as Hatta Shūzō therefore rejected class struggle as a means to bring about a social revolution, believing it would instead arise naturally when people sought to gain freedom and establish a classless society. Hatta believed that syndicalism would inevitably adopt capitalist modes of productions, preserve the factory system and retain the division of labour. He argued that even if capitalism were abolished by trade unions, inequality between different groups of workers would remain in place and mediation between them would necessitate the creation of a state. He also rejected the creation of workers' councils, which he believed would inevitably establish authoritarian rule and discriminate against people who did not participate directly in production.

In July 1927, the pure anarchist Iwasa Sakutarō published the book Anarchists Answer Like This; the following month, Jiyū Rengō published a review of the book by an anarcho-syndicalist named Katamachi, who criticised Iwasa's rejection of class struggle. Katamachi held that class struggle was a conflict between business owners and wage labourers for control of the means of production, in contrast with Iwasa's view that class struggle was a conflict over profit sharing. In September 1927, Jiyū Rengō published a response from the pure anarchist Mizunuma Tatsuo, who said pure anarchists rejected class reductionism, rather than class struggle. To Mizunuma, the pure anarchist conception of class struggle went beyond seizure of the means of production and instead sought to realise a classless society and the abolition of all exploitation of labour.

=== Second Conference ===
The Second Conference of Zenkoku Jiren was held in the Hongan-ji temple in Asakusa, on 19 and 20 November 1927. In the lead-up to the Second Conference of Zenkoku Jiren, the pure anarchists and anarcho-syndicalists had disputed the organisation's rules over who was allowed to attend. The anarcho-syndicalist Osaka Amalgamated Workers' Union, which had been expelled from the Kansai Regional Federation, insisted that it was still a member of Zenkoku Jiren and sent delegates to the conference. Debates over whether to permit the union's delegates to attend took up almost all of the conference's time; it finally ended halfway through the second day, with a resolution to uphold the expulsion of the union and prevent them from taking seats.

Augustin Souchy, the general secretary of the International Workers' Association (IWA), expressed alarm over the rising tensions between the anarcho-syndicalists and pure anarchists. In a letter to Zenkoku Jiren, he pleaded for them to stop arguing over what he saw as a purely theoretical dispute and attempted to draw their attention to anarchists and syndicalists cooperating in Spain and Latin America. The letter was published on the front page of Jiyū Rengō in January 1928, but it failed to calm tensions, with Kokuren responding that it would continue its fight against the anarcho-syndicalists in the Zenkoku Jiren, who it referred to as "betrayers, opportunists and union imperialists".

In February 1928, a conference of the Tokyo Printworkers' Union resolved to abandon anarcho-syndicalism and revise their principles. When the Second Conference of Zenkoku Jiren was reconvened in Hongō on 17 March 1928, the Tokyo printworkers proposed that the organisation replace its four-point programme with a simple affirmation to liberate workers and farmers through a libertarian federation. In an attempt to find a compromise, the Tokyo Casual Workers' Union offered a counter-proposal of a revised four-point programme: they would centre class struggle as the means for workers and farmers to achieve liberation; they would resist authority by organising workers and farmers, not by forming political parties; they would emphasise libertarian federation as an organisational form and reject centralisation; and they would oppose imperialism and support international workers' solidarity.

Debate over the revised programme continued throughout the conference, with the debate progressively deteriorating until pure anarchists were heckling any anarcho-syndicalists who spoke. Frustrated, the anarcho-syndicalists left the conference, while the pure anarchists continued to shout at them. Without dissenting anarcho-syndicalist voices left, the conference approved the original motion by the printworkers' union and formally expelled the anarcho-syndicalist unions from Zenkoku Jiren. A resolution by two trade unions from Okayama, which upheld a close relationship between Zenkoku Jiren and Kokuren, was also accepted by the conference. The pure anarchist Hatta Shūzō gave the closing speech of the conference. Despite his role in igniting the split, the pure anarchist theorist Iwasa Sakutarō was not involved in the conference, as by that time he had joined the Chinese anarchist movement.

=== Anarcho-syndicalists break away ===
The consolidation of pure anarchist influence within Zenkoku Jiren prompted much of its anarcho-syndicalist membership to break away from the organisation. Among them, the Koto General Workers' Union and Tokyo Food Workers' Union decided to form their own anarcho-syndicalist union federation. In April 1929, they established the All-Japan Libertarian Federal Council of Labour Unions (Japanese: 日本労働組合自由連合協議会, romanized: Nihon Rōdō Kūmiai Jiyū Rengō Kyōgikai), commonly abbreviated as Nihon Jikyō. Meanwhile, the Tokyo Casual Workers' Union, Nankatsu General Workers' Union and Osaka Amalgamated Workers' Union all joined the JCP-aligned Zenkyō trade union federation. The defection of so many anarcho-syndicalists to the ranks of Bolshevism, with the noted exceptions of Enishi Ichizo, Takahashi Kōkichi and Shirai Shinpei, made pure anarchists feel justified in their criticisms of anarcho-syndicalism.

The split also penetrated individual unions and other organisations. In April 1929, the Tokyo Printworkers' Union divided along factional lines, with the anarcho-syndicalists splitting off and establishing the Tokyo Printworkers' Federation, which remained outside Zenkoku Jiren. Throughout mid-1929, many more anarcho-syndicalists withdrew from Zenkoku Jiren and established their own unions, including printworkers in Kyoto, fishers in Izumi and workers in Kishiwada. In August 1929, the publication of Hatta Shūzō's pamphlet The Fallacy of the Theory of the Class Struggle by Zenkoku Jiren exacerbated factional disagreements within the publishing group of the pluralistic anarchist Kokushoku Sensen magazine. By December 1929, the publication collapsed, with each faction establishing their own separate magazines the following year.

== Pure anarchist period ==
Even after the split, Zenkoku Jiren continued to organise as a trade union federation. As of August 1928, it still counted 17 affiliated trade unions; these included individual unions in the cities of Hakodate, Kobe, Kyoto, Niigata, and Sapporo, and 11 other unions grouped together in regional federations in the Chūgoku, Hiroshima and Kantō regions. However, the organisation's activities diverged from those which were typical of the traditional labour movement.

Despite being based in urban industrial centres, the pure anarchists of Zenkoku Jiren redirected much of the organisation's attention towards farmers. Zenkoku Jiren widely publicised the poverty which tenant farmers lived in, contrasting it with the situation of industrial workers. In September 1928, Zenkoku Jiren published Hatta Shūzō's book Lectures on Social Problems in Farming Villages. The April 1929 issue of the organisation's renamed newspaper, Jiyū Rengō Shinbun, discussed the organisation's belief that farming villages could become the basis for anarchist communism, presenting mutual aid as central to rural life and depicting farmers as "doubly exploited" by both their landlords and city dwellers. Articles in Jiyū Rengō Shinbun encouraged farmers to engage in tax resistance and rent strikes, to cease intensive farming for commercial production and to reorganise their villages along libertarian lines. Police frequently broke up Zenkoku Jiren meetings in the big cities, but rarely interfered in meetings held in rural villages.

Zenkoku Jiren also shifted its focus away from short-term improvements to working conditions and instead organised workers for the long-term goal of establishing a post-capitalist society, even during active industrial disputes. During the onset of the Great Depression, the anarchist unions led a series of strike actions, largely in small firms. In December 1930, Zenkoku Jiren participated in a strike action over layoffs and wage cuts at the Shibaura Engineering Works, during which police shut down one of their union meetings and arrested its participants. When the strike was defeated three months later, Zenkoku Jiren declared in Jiyū Rengō Shinbun that the only solution to the workers' situation would be to overthrow capitalism and replace it with anarchist communism.

In February 1931, a section of pure anarchists in Zenkoku Jiren broke away from the organisation and established the Farming Villages Youth Association, commonly abbreviated as Nōseisha. In August 1931, Nōseisha member Miyazaki Akira called for Zenkoku Jiren to be disbanded, arguing that any kind of large-scale permanent organisation was inherently centralised and thus incapable of acting in accordance with libertarian values. He recommended the organisations be replaced by a decentralised network of small localised propaganda and action groups. This provoked fierce denunciations from Zenkoku Jiren, which suspected Nōseisha members of being police informants.

== Anti-militarism ==
In 1931, the trade union movement in Japan reached its peak, with 7.9% of workers (369,000 people) being organised into trade unions. At this time, the membership of Zenkoku Jiren peaked at 16,300 members; its anarcho-syndicalist rival, Nihon Jikyō, counted only 2,968. Together, the two anarchist union federations accounted for only 5% of the Japanese trade union movement. By this time, the state was increasingly attempting to suppress Zenkoku Jiren, frequently banning issues of its newspaper from sale. However, its presence within working class circles made it difficult to completely suppress, as factory workers often distributed the newspaper in their workplaces. In contrast, Kokuren, which had no presence in the workplace, collapsed under the weight of political repression and many of its members folded into Zenkoku Jiren.

Following the Japanese invasion of Manchuria in September 1931, Zenkoku Jiren fiercely criticised the rise of Japanese militarism. It analysed aggression in China to have grown out of the needs of capitalism for raw materials and new markets, at a time when rival Japanese and American capitalists were coming into direct competition. It also criticised the Japanese Communist Party (JCP) for supporting the Nationalist government in China, stating its view that anti-militarists should not aid the rise to power of big business interests and warlords in China as a possible replacement for Imperial Japanese forces. Zenkoku Jiren believed that, in order to be effective, anti-militarism required coordinated international action from workers and peasants rather than written articles in the press or resolutions in parliament.

In response to the invasion, Zenkoku Jiren initiated a campaign against the military industrial complex, calling for workers to refuse enlistment and for soldiers to disobey their officers. They called for anarchists from all countries to unite against imperialism and war, which they believed could only be prevented by establishing anarchist communism. During this time, Zenkoku Jiren also criticised the London Naval Conference on arms control, which it considered to be a means for militarists of different nations to negotiate with each other. It denounced the League of Nations, which it called the "International Capitalist League", for its failure to establish peace within the boundaries of a capitalist system and claimed it was merely delaying war rather than preventing it. In 1933, when Japan invaded Inner Mongolia, anarchists called for a general strike and mutiny in the army.

== Reunification ==
By 1933, the Japanese political left had come under severe political repression from the new fascist regime. The membership numbers of both anarchist trade union federations saw a decline over the subsequent years: the membership of Zenkoku Jiren dropped to 11,000 in 1932 and then to 4,359 in 1933; the members of Nihon Jikyō dropped to 2,850 in 1932 and then to 1,110 in 1933. Facing rapidly declining membership numbers and state repression, both federations began making moves towards reunification and looked towards other organisations with which to form a united front. Over the course of the early 1930s, many pure anarchists had realigned with anarcho-syndicalism, coming to the conclusion that the survival of the anarchist movement was of greater importance than the maintenance of ideological purity.

=== Changing perspectives ===
In January 1933, Zenkoku Jiren transferred control over its newspaper Jiyū Rengō Shinbun to an independent newspaper company, hoping to broaden its appeal to the wider anarchist movement. It came under the editorial control of a group around Aizawa Hisao, who sought to reorientate Zenkoku Jiren back towards anarcho-syndicalism, class conflict and short-term improvements to living and working conditions. A series of articles published in Jiyū Rengō Shinbun engaged in self-criticism regarding the organisation's rejection of syndicalism and its focus on maintaining ideological purity. The authors believed this to have caused the anarchist movement to stagnate and fail to connect with people's daily struggles. They called for a turn away from idealism, which they said had caused the organisation to focus excessively on "purely conceptual" issues such as anti-syndicalism, and to rebuild a grassroots movement.

This editorial change gave Nihon Jikyō the impression that Zenkoku Jiren was refocusing on the labour movement and class conflict. Nevertheless, Aizawa was ultimately unable to completely excise pure anarchist influence from Zenkoku Jiren or its newspaper, which regularly published articles from a range of views, including those that opposed the proposed unification and any return to industrial action. One writer for the paper argued against the use of trade unions, as he believed they prioritised the interests of producers over the whole of society. He concluded that trade unions could not be used to establish anarchist communism, and would instead form the nucleus for a dictatorship of the proletariat. He conceded that trade unions were "indispensable" to engaging in struggle and preparing workers for revolution, but he believed that they would have to be replaced with other forms of organisation in the event of a revolution. Between these two positions, many writers for the paper remained sceptical of the revolutionary potential of anarcho-syndicalism and continued to uphold anarchist communism, but nevertheless advocated strongly in favour of a united front with anarcho-syndicalists.

Aizawa's group was able to easily take over the newspaper due to the loose organisational structure of Zenkoku Jiren. The organisation had relied on spontaneous initiative and avoided delegation in order to avoid the creation of an internal bureaucracy, but this allowed highly-motivated groups to have a disproportionate influence over the direction of organisational policy. This played out again during the preparation for the organisation's third conference, when Aizawa's group pushed the preparatory committee to propose a new programme at the conference, despite fierce opposition from a minority of pure anarchists. In March and April 1933, representatives from Zenkoku Jiren and Nihon Jikyō attended each other's conferences, representing the first step towards reunification. On 2 April 1933, police shut down the third national conference of Zenkoku Jiren while Nihon Jikyō representative Takahashi Kokichi was in the middle of a speech on reunification.

The conference had intended to consider an "action programme", which would have reorientated the organisation towards fighting for reforms such as higher wages, the improvement of working conditions, the institution of equal pay for equal work and the establishment of unemployment benefits. The programme considered such short-term struggles to be a means to move towards the eventual abolition of capitalism and the state. Its proposals closely resembled the action programme adopted by Nihon Jikyō, allowing the two to move closer together based on their shared programme for reform. The two federations decided to hold a joint International Workers' Day demonstration, uniting them under anti-war, anti-fascist and anti-unemployment slogans. Hatta Shūzō did not participate in the reunification proceedings, as he had fallen gravely ill, although he contributed an article that called for closer contact between workers and the anarchist labour movement.

=== Formation of the united front ===
Calls for an anti-fascist united front increased after Japanese leftists received news of the rise of Nazi Germany. This made Japanese anarchists open to collaboration with anyone from social democrats to Bolsheviks, and from atheists to Buddhists, although the police regularly shut down their joint meetings and rallies. In May 1933, Zenkoku Jiren and Nihon Jikyō established the Kanto Labour Union Council, which brought together all anti-fascist unions in the region; in June, they established the League for Opposing and Crushing Nazism and Fascism in Kanto; and in July, they established the League for Opposing Repression and Crushing Fascism in Kansai. Pure anarchists within Zenkoku Jiren justified the formation of these united fronts as a necessary response to the rise of reactionary politics in Japan at that time. They also believed that, through such united fronts, they could win more people over from anarcho-syndicalism to anarchist communism.

By the end of the year, advocates of a compromise with anarcho-syndicalism outnumbered the staunch partisans of pure anarchism within Zenkoku Jiren. On 1 January 1934, Zenkoku Jiren and Nihon Jikyō issued a joint statement calling for the revolutionary overthrow of capitalism and imperialism in Japan. The two organisations admitted their own share of responsibility for the conflict between them over the previous years, with Zenkoku Jiren expressing regret for its dedication to political sectarianism and its abandonment of industrial action. On 14 January 1934, Nihon Jikyō finally merged back into Zenkoku Jiren, hoping they could combine their efforts to resist political repression. From the Nihon Jikyō, Tadokoro Shigeo was appointed to the secretariat of the newly united federation. That year, Utagawa Noboru recruited a former student of the Marxist labour school, Morikawa Masaki, into Zenkoku Jiren.

== Decline and dissolution ==
On 18 March 1934, the reunified Zenkoku Jiren held its fourth conference in Tokyo. Among the conference's stated objectives were the strengthening their forces against the advancement of fascism and capitalism, and opposition to layoffs, wage reductions and short-term contracts. The conference was attended by less than 100 delegates, who recognised that out of 5 million workers in Japan, only 360,000 of them were organised into unions, of which Zenkoku Jiren accounted for only a small fraction. The organisation's combined membership had continued to decline even after its reunification, dropping to only 4,092 members.

By 1935, membership of Zenkoku Jiren had declined even further to only 2,300 members. In February 1935, Jiyū Rengō Shinbun ceased publication. In May 1935, when the organisation held an International Workers' Day demonstration in Shibaura, only 300 people turned up. Police prevented speakers from addressing the crowd and arrested many participants, but the demonstrators marched through the streets of Tokyo with their black flags. This would be the last such demonstration in pre-war Japan, as the following year, the state banned International Workers' Day; right-wing unions would instead celebrate National Foundation Day on 11 February.

In 1934, Aizawa Hisao established the Anarchist Communist Party of Japan, a centralised organisation which aimed to create the conditions for a revolution through which it could establish an anarchist regime. It recruited members from Zenkoku Jiren and took control of its publishing apparatus. In November 1935, Aizawa and other party members unsuccessfully attempted to carry out a bank robbery, for which they were arrested. Using torture, the police forced them to confess to their involvement in the party. Over the final months of 1935, police rounded up around 400 anarchists, regardless of whether they were party members or unaffiliated individuals. Anarcho-syndicalist activists were often arrested indiscriminately, with 100 workers of the Tokyo Printworkers' Union being arrested.

By the end of 1935, the state had thoroughly suppressed Zenkoku Jiren; and by early 1936, Zenkoku Jiren was disbanded. The anarcho-syndicalist Yamaguchi Kensuke blamed the actions of the Anarchist Communist Party for the suppression of the anarchist movement. Later that year, some of the organisation's veterans volunteered to fight on the side of the anarchist militias during the Spanish Civil War. Meanwhile, the Japanese military took an increasingly large role in the government, the country's military budget increased to 71% of government expenditure and, in 1937, the Second Sino-Japanese War broke out.

== Bibliography ==
- Bray, Mark (2013). Translating Anarchy: The Anarchism of Occupy Wall Street. Zero Books. ISBN 978-1-78279-126-3.
- Crump, John (1992). "Anarchist Opposition to Japanese Militarism, 1926–1937". Japan Forum. 4 (1): 73–79. doi:10.1080/09555809208721445. ISSN 0955-5803.
- Crump, John (1993). Hatta Shūzō and Pure Anarchism in Interwar Japan. Palgrave Macmillan. doi:10.1007/978-1-349-23038-9. ISBN 978-1-349-23040-2.
- Crump, John (1995). "The Japanese Pure Anarchists and the Theory of Anarchist-Communism". In Lowe, Peter; Moeshart, Herman (eds.). Western Interactions With Japan. Routledge. doi:10.4324/9781315060323. ISBN 978-1-315-06032-3.
- Crump, John (1996). "Anarchist Communism and Leadership: The Case of Iwasa Sakutaro". In Neary, Ian (ed.). Leaders and Leadership in Japan. Routledge. pp. 155–174. ISBN 978-1-873410-41-7.
- Damier, Vadim (2009) [2000]. Anarcho-syndicalism in the 20th Century. Translated by Archibald, Malcolm. Edmonton: Black Cat Press. ISBN 978-0-9737827-6-9.
- Hunter, Janet (2000) [1933]. "Left-wing Unions". Industrial Labour in Japan. Vol. 5. Routledge. pp. 108–110. ISBN 978-0-415-218-20-7.
- Marshall, Peter H. (2008) [1992]. "Japan". Demanding the Impossible: A History of Anarchism. London: Harper Perennial. pp. 523–527. ISBN 978-0-00-686245-1. OCLC 218212571.
- Perkins, Chris (2018). "From the Ashes of the Great Kantō Earthquake: the Tokyo Imperial University Settlement". Japan Forum. 31 (3): 408–433. doi:10.1080/09555803.2018.1544585. hdl:20.500.11820/38e78a56-8835-435e-bd41-3b4232f5a284. ISSN 0955-5803.
- Ramnath, Maia (2019). "Non-Western Anarchisms and Postcolonialism". In Adams, Matthew S.; Levy, Carl (eds.). The Palgrave Handbook of Anarchism. London: Palgrave Macmillan. pp. 677–695. doi:10.1007/978-3-319-75620-2_38. ISBN 978-3-319-75619-6. S2CID 150357033.
- van der Walt, Lucien; Schmidt, Michael (2009). Black Flame: The Revolutionary Class Politics of Anarchism and Syndicalism. Edinburgh: AK Press. ISBN 978-1-904859-16-1. LCCN 2006933558. OCLC 1100238201.
- van der Walt, Lucien (2019). "Syndicalism". In Adams, Matthew S.; Levy, Carl (eds.). The Palgrave Handbook of Anarchism. London: Palgrave Macmillan. pp. 249–264. doi:10.1007/978-3-319-75620-2_14. ISBN 978-3-319-75619-6. S2CID 242074567.
