= Jikyō =

Japanese trade union federation (1929–1934)

Libertarian Federal Council of Labour Unions of Japan
- 日本労働組合自由連合協議会
- Abbreviation: Jikyō
- Merged into: Zenkoku Jiren
- Formation: April 1929; 97 years ago
- Dissolved: 14 January 1934; 92 years ago
- Type: National trade union federation
- Headquarters: Tokyo
- Location: Japan
- Members: 2,968 (1931)
- General Secretary: Tadokoro Shigeo
- Formerly called: All-Japan Libertarian Federal Council of Labour Unions (1929–1930); All-Japan Conference of Libertarian Federation Groups (1930–1931)

The Libertarian Federal Council of Labour Unions of Japan (Japanese: 日本労働組合自由連合協議会, romanized: Nihon Rōdō Kūmiai Jiyū Rengō Kyōgikai (Note: Also translated as the Japanese Libertarian United Conference of Labour Unions, or Libertarian Federation Council of Labour Unions of Japan.)), (Note: From 1929 to 1930, it was initially known as the All-Japan Libertarian Federal Council of Labour Unions (Japanese: 全国労働組合自由連合協議会, romanized: Zenkoku Rōdō Kūmiai Jiyū Rengō Kyōgikai); then, from 1930 to 1931, it was known as the All-Japan Conference of Libertarian Federation Groups (Japanese: 自由連合団体全国会議, romanized: Jiyū Rengō Dantai Zenkoku Kaigi); its final name, the Libertarian Federal Council of Labour Unions of Japan, was used from 1931 until its dissolution in 1934.) commonly abbreviated as Jikyō (Japanese: 自協), (Note: From 1929 to 1930, it was initially known by the abbreviation of Zenkoku Jikyō (Japanese: 全国自協); it later adopted the abbreviation Nihon Jikyō (Japanese: 日本自協) in 1931; the simple form Jikyō is used to refer to the organisation throughout its history.) was a Japanese anarcho-syndicalist trade union federation. Established by anarcho-syndicalist members of Zenkoku Jiren in 1929, after the organisation had come under the control of its "pure anarchist" faction, members of Jikyō led a series of strike actions during the early years of the Great Depression. Following the Japanese invasion of Manchuria, Jikyō members sought to reunite with Zenkoku Jiren and form a united front against the rise of Japanese militarism. The two organisations reunified in 1934, but it was suppressed within two years.

== Background ==
During the late 1910s, Japanese anarchists joined the country's newly established trade union movement and began to focus much of their activities on influencing the unions, leading to the growth of anarcho-syndicalism in the country. As the years went on, divisions between the anarcho-syndicalists and the reformist and Bolshevik factions of the trade union movement intensified, eventually causing a split in the movement. Throughout 1920 and 1921, successive attempts to unify the different factions under one organisation failed and the anarcho-syndicalists turned against collaboration with the reformists and Bolsheviks. Anarchist trade unions moved to establish their own trade union federation, but their efforts were frustrated by following the 1923 Great Kantō earthquake, when military police murdered the anarcho-syndicalist movement's leading organiser Ōsugi Sakae. In May 1926, anarchist unions finally came together and established the All-Japan Libertarian Federation of Labour Unions (Japanese: 全国労働組合自由連合会, romanized: Zenkoku Rōdō Kumiai Jiyū Rengō-kai), commonly abbreviated as Zenkoku Jiren.

== Establishment ==
Within a year of its founding, Zenkoku Jiren fell to an internal split between its anarcho-syndicalist and pure anarchist factions, due to theoretical disagreements over industrialisation and class conflict. The conflict came to a head at the organisation's second conference in February 1927, when pure anarchists and anarcho-syndicalists clashed over proposals to amend their organisational programme. Pure anarchists continuously heckled anarcho-syndicalist speakers, resulting in the withdrawal of the anarcho-syndicalist delegates from the conference; the pure anarchists who remained behind moved to expel the anarcho-syndicalist delegates from the organisation. The consolidation of pure anarchist influence within Zenkoku Jiren prompted much of its anarcho-syndicalist membership to break away from the organisation. Among them, the Koto General Workers' Union and Tokyo Food Workers' Union decided to form their own anarcho-syndicalist union federation. In April 1929, they held a preparatory conference to establish an All-Japan Libertarian Federal Council of Labour Unions (Japanese: 全国労働組合自由連合協議会, romanized: Zenkoku Rōdō Kūmiai Jiyū Rengō Kyōgikai), abbreviated as Zenkoku Jikyō (Japanese: 全国自協).

The establishment of this new trade union federation was confirmed at a national conference, held in Tokyo in June 1929; in attendance were delegates from 12 unions in the Chūbu, Kansai, Kantō and Kyushu regions, representing about 2,000 workers in the chemical, metal and printing industries, among others. The new organisation adopted a programme which called for: opposition to dismissals and factory shutdowns, which were both being carried out by employers as part of a programme of "industrial rationalisation"; the establishment of a minimum wage in Japan at ¥2.50 (equivalent to ¥1,493 in 2019) per hour, with biannual wage increases; the establishment of equal pay for equal work and the prohibition of employment discrimination based on age, race or gender; and the establishment of workers' compensation and a disability benefits system, to be paid for by employers. In 1930, the organisation changed its name to the All-Japan Conference of Libertarian Federation Groups (Japanese: 自由連合団体全国会議, romanized: Jiyū Rengō Dantai Zenkoku Kaigi).

== Strike actions ==
At the time of the establishment of Zenkoku Jikyō, Japan was facing heightened levels of class conflict due to the onset of the Great Depression. Workers increasingly sought to fight back against layoffs, lockouts and wage cuts. Industrial actions often escalated into violence, with employers frequently soliciting police intervention and hiring yakuza to intimidate and attack workers. Despite its low membership numbers, Jikyō was deeply involved in the industrial actions of the time. Members of the organisation regularly intervened on the side of workers in workplace disputes, even when it was clear that the workers might lose, and armed themselves with clubs to defend themselves from police violence.

In April 1931, the Nihon Senjū company, which employed 300 workers in its dye factory in Asakusa, rescinded its employment contracts and attempted to layoff part of its workforce. The Kanto General Workers' Union, which was affiliated with Jikyō, responded by going on strike. Workers also occupied the factory, in order to prevent strikebreakers from being brought in to resume manufacturing. When the company cut off supplies to the factory occupiers, the workers responded with a hunger strike. As the occupation continued, women gave medical attention to the hunger strikers, distributed propaganda and organised political demonstrations, and even harassed company directors at their own homes. The women's activism would culminate in the establishment of a consumers' union, which they maintained even after the industrial action ended. On International Workers' Day, Jikyō member Chiba Hiroshi climbed to the top of the factory's chimney and hoisted an anarchist black flag, which remained up there for two weeks. After 24 days of the factory occupation, widespread public support for the strike brought the employers to the negotiating table and the dispute was resolved through police arbitration. The successful use of the hunger strike in this conflict led to its wider adoption by the labour movement.

In July 1931, a workplace dispute broke out in the Tokyo Gas company after it hired independent contractors to work alongside its permanent employees. Jikyō intervened, with some of its members occupying one of the company's fuel tanks. As it was the middle of the summer and they had no water, they were forced to drink their own urine, which eventually forced them to give up the occupation on 2 August. The dispute was again settled under police arbitration, which resulted in a defeat for the independent contractors.

In late 1931, the organisation changed its name again, this time settling on calling itself the Libertarian Federal Council of Labour Unions of Japan, (Japanese: 日本労働組合自由連合協議会, romanized: Nihon Rōdō Kūmiai Jiyū Rengō Kyōgikai), commonly abbreviated as Nihon Jikyō. At this time, its membership numbers peaked at 2,968 members; the number of members declined to 2,850 in 1932 and 1,110 in 1933. Throughout its existence, Nihon Jikyō remained significantly smaller than Zenkoku Jiren. Due to its focus on participating in class conflict, Nihon Jikyō also paid little attention to developing a theoretical critique of capitalism, which attracted criticism from the pure anarchists of Zenkoku Jiren. Nevertheless, in an analysis of Marxism, Nihon Jikyō member Kubo Yuzuru asserted that the goal of Marxists was to create a new ruling class rather than to end class stratification.

== Reunification ==
As membership numbers of the anarchist unions declined in the wake of the Japanese invasion of Manchuria, many pure anarchists within Zenkoku Jiren sought a rapprochement with the anarcho-syndicalists of Nihon Jikyō. By 1933, members of both organisations were proposing their reunification and even began to look to non-anarchist organisations to establish a united front against the rise of Japanese militarism. On 5 March 1933, the Kantō branch of Nihon Jikyō held a district conference which was attended by delegates from Zenkoku Jiren. Delegates from Nihon Jikyō then attended the third national conference of Zenkoku Jiren on 2 April, but police shut down the event while Jikyō member Takahashi Kōkichi was giving a speech on reunification. At the conference, Zenkoku Jiren had planned to adopt a new programme which strongly resembled that of Nihon Jikyō. The following month, on International Workers' Day, Nihon Jikyō and Zenkoku Jiren held a joint demonstration, during which they protested against war, fascism and unemployment.

The rise of Nazi Germany also prompted the two organisations to establish a number of anti-fascist united fronts, together with other sections of the Japanese left: in May 1933, they established the Kantō Labour Union Council, which brought together left-wing trade unions in the region; in June, they established the League for Opposing and Crushing Nazism and Fascism in Kantō; and in July, they established the League for Opposing Repression and Crushing Fascism in Kansai. Over the course of that year, members of Nihon Jikyō noticed that Zenkoku Jiren publications were reorienting themselves back towards class conflict and the labour movement. In an effort to mend relations with the pure anarchists, a Nihon Jikyō study group published a report arguing for the establishment of libertarian communism through anarcho-syndicalist methods. This report was rejected by some pure anarchists in Zenkoku Jiren, who remained critical of anarcho-syndicalism, but who nevertheless supported a united front and even reunification with Nihon Jikyō.

On 1 January 1934, the two organisations issued a joint statement that called for the overthrow of capitalism and imperialism in a social revolution. Both organisations took their own share of responsibility for the conflict between them, with Nihon Jikyō admitting it had "put the labour unions above everything else". On 14 January 1934, Nihon Jikyō formally dissolved itself and merged back into Zenkoku Jiren, bringing an end to five years of factional conflict within the anarchist movement. Jikyo secretary Tadokoro Shigeo was appointed to the reunified secretariat of Zenkoku Jiren. At the fourth national conference of Zenkoku Jiren, held two months later, the reunited delegates called for the strengthening of the organisation against capitalism and fascism, and to oppose layoffs, wage reductions and short-term contracts. Despite the reunification, the membership numbers of Zenkoku Jiren continued to decline, dropping from 5,469 in 1933 to 4,092 in 1934 and then to 2,300 in 1935. The reunified organisation held one final International Workers' Day demonstration in 1935. By the following year, the Japanese state had completely suppressed the anarchist and anti-fascist movements.

== Bibliography ==
- Crump, John (1993). Hatta Shūzō and Pure Anarchism in Interwar Japan. Palgrave Macmillan. doi:10.1007/978-1-349-23038-9. ISBN 978-1-349-23040-2.
- Crump, John (1995). "The Japanese Pure Anarchists and the Theory of Anarchist-Communism". In Lowe, Peter; Moeshart, Herman (eds.). Western Interactions With Japan. Routledge. ISBN 9781315060323.
- Marshall, Peter H. (2008) [1992]. "Japan". Demanding the Impossible: A History of Anarchism. London: Harper Perennial. pp. 523–527. ISBN 978-0-00-686245-1. OCLC 218212571.
- Ramnath, Maia (2019). "Non-Western Anarchisms and Postcolonialism". In Adams, Matthew S.; Levy, Carl (eds.). The Palgrave Handbook of Anarchism. London: Palgrave Macmillan. pp. 677–695. doi:10.1007/978-3-319-75620-2_38. ISBN 978-3319756196. S2CID 150357033.
- van der Walt, Lucien; Schmidt, Michael (2009). Black Flame: The Revolutionary Class Politics of Anarchism and Syndicalism. Edinburgh: AK Press. ISBN 978-1-904859-16-1. LCCN 2006933558. OCLC 1100238201.
