= Anarchism in Japan =

Anarchism in Japan began to emerge in the late 19th and early 20th centuries, as Western anarchist literature began to be translated into Japanese. It existed throughout the 20th century in various forms, despite repression by the state that became particularly harsh during the two world wars, and it reached its height in the 1920s with organisations such as Kokuren and Zenkoku Jiren.

Japanese anarchism had a number of notable leading figures who dominated the movement at different times. The first of these leaders was Kōtoku Shūsui, who led the development of an anarchist faction within existing left-wing movements, which then split into its own independent movement in the first decade of the 1900s. Kōtoku was executed for treason in 1911, and the movement was subject to severe repression for a decade. The next leading figure was Ōsugi Sakae, who involved himself heavily in support for anarcho-syndicalism and helped to bring the movement out of its 'winter period', until he was murdered by military police in 1923.

Another leading figure was Hatta Shūzō, who reoriented the anarchist movement in a more anarcho-communist direction during the late 1920s, opposing labour unions as a tool of revolution. This produced a split between anarcho-syndicalists and anarcho-communists, which dominated anarchist politics and weakened the movement. From 1931 onwards, the anarchist movement was suppressed more harshly due to the wartime policies of the Empire of Japan. After the war, an anarchist movement once again appeared (the Japanese Anarchist Federation) and was led by important pre-war anarchists such as Iwasa Sakutarō and Ishikawa Sanshirō, but it was once again weakened by splits between the two factions.

From very early on in the history of Japanese anarchism, the movement was in close contact with anarchists from Europe, America, and elsewhere in Asia. Japanese anarcho-syndicalist ideas were often inspired by French syndicalists, and works by writers such as Peter Kropotkin and Emma Goldman had a great influence on the Japanese anarchist movement.

== Origins ==
Andō Shōeki, an eighteenth-century Japanese doctor and philosopher, is sometimes considered to be proto-anarchist in thought. He advocated what was described by Bowen Raddeker as "what we might call mutual aid", and he challenged the hierarchical relationships in Japanese society, including the hierarchy between the sexes. In 1908, the early socialist and anarchist Japanese newspaper Nihon Heimin Shinbun described him as an anarchist.

The communalist structure of some agricultural villages during the Tokugawa era is also seen as being proto-anarchist. One individual who would become an anarchist in his adult life, Iwasa Sakutarō, was born in a farming hamlet in the early Meiji era. His grandfather had used his influence as headman to encourage communal farming practices, resulting in the creation of a "half-communist village". This helped to inspire Iwasa to believe in the possibility of an anarchist society.

Modern anarchist ideas first had an influence in Japan on the extreme end of the Japanese liberal movement. In the 1880s, the rise of the pro-democracy Freedom and People's Rights Movement coincided with the prominent assassination of Alexander II of Russia by left-wing extremists, and historian Tsuzuki claimed that "the ideal figure for Liberal extremists was said to be an assassin." Kōtoku Shūsui, who would later become a leading anarchist, started off as a supporter of liberal parties including the Rikken Jiyūtō in the 1890s, even acting as the English translator for their newspaper for two years. When the liberal faction joined the new right-wing Rikken Seiyūkai party in 1900, however, Kōtoku became disillusioned with liberalism. He was attracted to socialism instead, and quickly involved himself in the budding socialist movement.

=== Early socialist movement ===
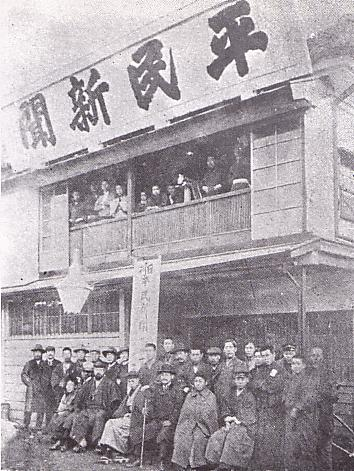
A photograph of the Heimin-sha (Commoners' Society), who published the Heimin Shinbun

In 1898, Kōtoku joined the staff of the Yorozu Chūhō newspaper, wherein he published an article in 1900 condemning war in Manchuria. He published his first book in 1901, titled Imperialism, Monster of the Twentieth Century, which was a monumental work in the history of Japanese leftism, criticising both Japanese and Western imperialism from the point of view of a revolutionary socialist. In May 1901, Kōtoku was involved in the founding of the first Social Democratic Party in Japan. It was immediately outlawed under the 1900 Peace Preservation Law, despite its commitment to parliamentary tactics. In 1903, he also wrote the book Quintessence of Socialism, acknowledging influence from Karl Marx.

As Japan drew closer to war with Russia, Kōtoku collaborated with fellow socialist Sakai Toshihiko and the Christian pacifist Uchimura Kanzō to oppose the war. After the editor of Yorozu Chūhō endorsed the idea of a war with Russia in 1903, they withdrew from the newspaper. Together with another socialist, Ishikawa Sanshirō, Kōtoku and Sakai started the anti-war Heimin-sha group and its associated newspaper Heimin Shinbun (literally "Commoners' Newspaper") in November 1903, founded on the slogans of "Democracy, Socialism, and Pacifism".

When the Russo-Japanese War broke out anyway in February 1904, it had a significant impact upon Japanese radicals. The newspaper published an appeal "To the Socialists in Russia", advocating an anti-war perspective, while also urging radicals only to fight against their government using peaceful means. Iwasa Sakutarō, living in the United States at this point, was particularly radicalised towards anarcho-communism as a result of the war.

Kōtoku translated Marx's The Communist Manifesto into Japanese for the first time, published in Heimin Shinbun in its anniversary issue, for which he was fined. The newspaper subsequently was closed down by the government, and it ceased publication in January 1905. Its last edition was printed entirely in red ink. Its fairly brief run earned Kōtoku a short prison sentence, which he served from February to July 1905. After the conclusion of the Russo-Japanese War, the Heimin-sha group dissolved itself in November 1905.

== Emergence of anarchism (1905–1911) ==
Kōtoku's imprisonment only gave him further opportunities to read leftist literature, such as Peter Kropotkin's Fields, Factories and Workshops, and he announced in August 1905 that "Indeed, I had gone [to prison] as a Marxian Socialist and returned as a radical Anarchist." He decided to leave Japan due to its restrictions on freedom of speech, and travelled to the United States in November 1905, where he lived until June 1906.

While in America, he spent most of his time in California, and his ideology further shifted towards anarchism. He wrote to the anarcho-communist Kropotkin, who gave him permission to translate his works into Japanese. Kōtoku also came into contact with the Industrial Workers of the World, an anarcho-syndicalist union, and became aware of Emma Goldman's anarchist newspaper Mother Earth.

Before he left California, Kōtoku founded a Social Revolutionary Party (Shakai Kakumei Tō) among Japanese-American immigrants. More than 50 people joined the party, including Iwasa Sakutarō. The party was inspired by the Russian Socialist Revolutionaries who often used violent tactics, and the Japanese party quickly radicalised towards the use of these tactics to bring about the anarchist revolution. The party began publishing a journal entitled Kakumei (Revolution), which routinely made such statements as "the sole means [to achieve revolution] is the bomb". They also published an 'Open Letter' addressed to Emperor Meiji threatening his assassination in 1907, which provoked Japanese politicians to implement harsher crackdowns on left-wing groups.

Kōtoku arrived back in Japan on June 28, 1906, where he spoke to a meeting about "The Tide of the World Revolutionary Movement". In this speech, he spoke on the ideas he had developed while in the US, and most notably raised the question of whether reform or revolution was the suitable approach for Japanese leftism. This speech had a great impact upon Japanese socialists, and led to many seriously challenging the usefulness of contesting parliamentary elections.

In September 1906, Kōtoku received a letter from Kropotkin himself, which he published in the socialist press in November 1906, which promoted the rejection of parliamentary tactics in favour of what he called "anti-political syndicalism". In early 1907, he published a series of articles expanding upon this idea, including the most famous, which was titled "The Change In My Thought", in which he argued that "A real social revolution cannot possibly be achieved by means of universal suffrage and a parliamentary policy. There is no way to reach our goal of socialism other than by the direct action of the workers, united as one."

=== Split from the Socialist Party ===
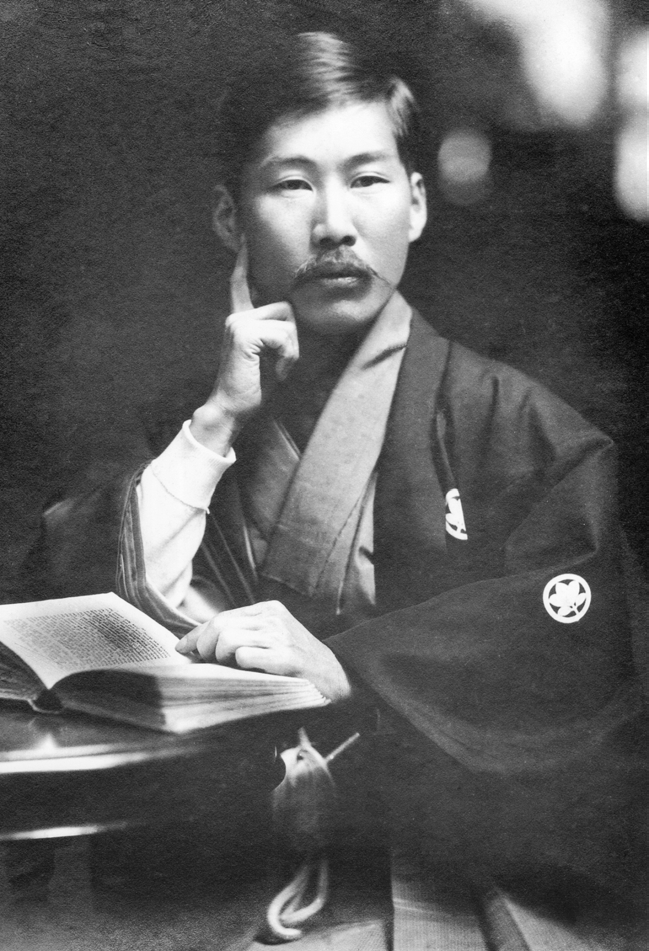
A photograph of the leading anarchist, Kōtoku Shūsui

An anarchist faction had firmly emerged within the socialist movement, largely due to Kōtoku's influence. Nevertheless, united organisations between anarchists and the more reformist social democrats still existed, such as the Japan Socialist Party which had been founded in 1906. This organisation had pledged to advocate socialism only within the limits of the law, and had been permitted to do so by the more moderate government of Saionji Kinmochi. Sakai Toshihiko also made great effort to reunite anarchists and socialists to restart the publishing of Heimin Shinbun, which he managed to do in January 1907.

In February 1907, the Japan Socialist Party held a party conference in Tokyo. The ideas promoted by Kōtoku had seriously challenged the party program and its pledge to observe reformist tactics, and a vigorous debate ensued between the 'soft' pro-parliamentary and 'hard' pro-direct action factions. A compromise ultimately prevailed narrowly over Kōtoku's resolution by 28 to 22 votes, but the demonstration of the strength of the anarchist movement had drawn the attention of the government. As a result, the party was banned just days after the conference; Heimin Shinbun closed in April 1907, due to the split.

The 'hard' faction faced many problems in the years following 1907. In June 1908, the Red Flag Incident occurred, in which an anarcho-communist demonstration was attacked by police. Many significant figures in the nascent movement were arrested, including Ōsugi Sakae, Hitoshi Yamakawa, Kanno Sugako, and Kanson Arahata.

Kōtoku endeavoured to translate an American anarcho-syndicalist pamphlet titled The Social General Strike. Unions were banned due to the 1900 Peace Preservation Law, however, and much anarchist discussion, particularly surrounding unions, was highly theoretical rather than practical. The goal of a revolutionary general strike learned from the syndicalist IWW was frustrated both by a failure to organise workers and by the suppression of labour movements.

Kōtoku also translated Kropotkin's seminal work The Conquest of Bread into Japanese, finishing in 1909. He was assisted by Ōsugi and Yamakawa, whose work was cut short by their imprisonment.

In 1910, Akaba Hajime penned a pamphlet entitled The Peasant's Gospel (Nômin no Fukuin) which argued in favour of creating an anarchist paradise through anarchist communism, demonstrating the influence of Kropotkin on the movement. He was forced to go underground after illegally distributing the pamphlet, but eventually he was caught and imprisoned, dying in custody in 1912.

=== High Treason Incident ===
The Japanese anarchist movement existed under harsh and repressive conditions, limiting the range of activity of its members. They had an extensive historical connection with terrorism and violence, such as their ideological affinity with assassination and the violent tactics of the Russian Socialist Revolutionaries. Therefore, some anarchist militants began to make plans for a bombing campaign in 1909.

When Takichi Miyashita had little success when distributing a pamphlet by Buddhist anarchist Uchiyama Gudō that was critical of the Emperor, he became determined out of frustration to assassinate the figurehead of the Japanese state. He gained the active support of three others, including Kanno Sugako, who was now released from prison and having a love affair with the already-married Kōtoku. The latter even briefly supported his efforts to acquire a bomb.

Kōtoku withdrew from the plot in late 1909, opting not to become a martyr for the cause; the other four continued without him regardless. In May 1910, the plot was discovered, and despite his withdrawal Kōtoku was arrested and indicted as well in June. The incident spiralled out into ideological repression, and hundreds of radicals were arrested despite having no connection to the plot at all. 26 anarchists were ultimately indicted, all of whom were convicted; only four (or five, if counting Kōtoku) had any direct connection to the plot. 12 of these were sentenced to death and executed in January 1911, including Kōtoku, Kanno, and Uchiyama.

Some of those imprisoned for the Red Flag Incident in 1908 were still in prison at the time of the plot's discovery, and so could not be implicated in the High Treason Incident. Ōsugi Sakae was one of these figures, and alongside forswearing violent tactics, he took a leading role in the post-1911 anarchist movement upon his release.

== 'Winter period' and revival (1911–1923) ==
=== The 'Winter period' ===
The High Treason trial and its fallout marked the start of the 'winter period' (冬時代, fuyu jidai) of Japanese anarchism, in which left-wing organisations were tightly monitored and controlled, and militants and activists were tailed 24 hours a day by police. Some anarchists, such as Ishikawa Sanshirō, fled the country to avoid persecution. When Iwasa Sakutarō returned from the US to Japan in 1914 he was immediately placed under house arrest. He remained under constant surveillance for five years, and those who visited him were often subjected to police violence. Kanson Arahata, who was one of those in prison at the time of the Incident, retreated to the countryside during the winter period, not returning to Tokyo until 1916.

Arahata and Ōsugi Sakae were both anarcho-syndicalists, and helped to push the anarchist movement in that direction. Ōsugi understood French, and his translations of French media became the principal source of information in Japan on the French CGT union, a pioneer of syndicalist tactics. Together, the two began to publish a journal in October 1912 called Modern Thought (Kindai Shisō), which explored anarchist syndicalism through a literary and philosophical lens, so as to avoid government persecution.

This was followed by the formation of a 'Society for the Study of Syndicalism' in 1913, delivering lectures on the CGT and the efforts of British syndicalist Tom Mann. In both of these outlets, discussion tended towards the abstract and remained disconnected from the workers it supposedly concerned, which was a natural result of the restrictions of the winter period. Generally speaking, Ōsugi's endeavours were strongly academic and theoretical in nature at this point, and in his literary work he became influenced by thinkers such as Henri Bergson, Georges Sorel, Max Stirner, and Friedrich Nietzsche.

In October 1914, Ōsugi and Arahata attempted to replace Modern Thought with a revival of the old Heimin Shinbun newspaper, but this was met with repeated suppression of its issues and was forced to fold in March 1915. Several attempts by other anarchists to publish radical newspapers and journals in this period were repeatedly banned as well, and some editors were imprisoned.

The theoretical split between anarcho-communism and anarcho-syndicalism that emerged within European anarchism was not yet a significant issue within Japanese anarchism, particularly because labour unions were still illegal. However, when Kropotkin, a leading advocate of the former faction, signed the Manifesto of the Sixteen in support of the Allied cause in the First World War, it detracted sharply from his reputation among Japanese anarchists. The Japanese movement was strongly anti-militarist, and so the reaction against Kropotkin also detracted from the reputation of the communist faction.

==== Seitō and anarcha-feminism ====
During the winter period, the feminist Bluestocking or Seitō magazine was formed. The anarcha-feminist Itō Noe became the editor of this magazine in 1915, and under her leadership, Seitō became more radical. As an anarchist, Itō was highly critical of the existing political system in Japan, which led her to call for an anarchism to exist in "everyday practice," namely that people should in various small ways seek routinely to undermine the kokutai, the existing system of government. Itō was especially critical of the way that most Japanese people automatically deferred to the state and accepted the claim that the emperor was a god who had to be obeyed unconditionally, leading her to complain that it was very difficult to get most people to think critically. As someone who had challenged the kokutai, Itō was constantly harassed by the police, to the point that she complained of feeling that her home was a prison, as she could not go out without a policeman stopping her.

Itō also led the journal to focus more on discussing social issues. From 1914 to 1916, she engaged in a debate on the pages of the magazine with another feminist, Yamakawa Kikue, about whether prostitution should be legalized or not. Itō argued for the legalization of prostitution for the same reasons that she favored the legalization of abortion, namely that she believed that women's bodies belonged only to them, and that the state had no business telling a woman what she may or may not do with her body.

Furthermore, Itō argued that the social system did not offer many economic opportunities to women and that most Japanese prostitutes were destitute women who turned to selling sex to survive, which led her to the conclusion that they should not be punished for merely seeking a means to live. Itō wrote social criticism and novels, and translated socialist and anarchist writings from English to Japanese, from authors such as American Emma Goldman (The Tragedy of Woman's Emancipation, etc.). In February 1916, Seitō published its last edition due to a lack of funds, as the government had prevented distributors from carrying the magazine.

=== End of the winter period ===
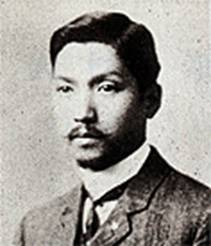
Ōsugi Sakae (c. 1920)

The 'winter period' came to an end in 1918 as the stringent repression on left-wing movements imposed by the Japanese government was challenged by growing social unrest. During the First World War, Japanese industry rapidly expanded, and combined with inspiration by the 1917 Russian Revolution, this led to a huge growth in the labour movement. More than 66,000 workers engaged in labour disputes, despite the fact that strikes were still technically illegal. Inflation had also led to economic unrest in the form of the rice riots of 1918. The persecution of anarchist activists did not end in 1918, but it was no longer as all-encompassing as it had been in the years before.

The growing labour unions were met with enthusiasm from the anarchist movement, and quickly gained a foothold. Ideologically, anarchists favoured a decentralised structure for unions, which was met with resistance from the other factions within the unions: the reformists, who led most unions early on; and Japanese Bolsheviks, who sought to emulate the revolution achieved by Vladimir Lenin. The core of the anarchist union movement was in the printworkers' unions, which had a combined membership of 3,850 by 1924.

In the early 1920s, anarchists were somewhat willing to cooperate with the Bolshevik faction, due to an (albeit limited) ideological affinity. Kanson Arahata was among those anarcho-syndicalists who had turned to bolshevism after 1917, and was later personally involved in the 1922 founding of the Japanese Communist Party. These connections enabled joint projects between the two factions, such as a joint labour union alliance and joint demonstrations on May Day 1920. Another such connection was through the Rōdō Ūndō journal, launched by Ōsugi Sakae in October 1919 to report on and encourage the labour movement. In 1920, the Comintern itself helped to fund the journal for its second series of publication in 1921.

By 1922, there was a split between anarchists and Bolsheviks, called in Japanese the Ana-Boru Ronsō. Ideological differences, particularly the anarchist insistence on decentralisation of the labour union movement, contributed significantly to this split, and were exacerbated by government repression. Anarchists also objected to the actions of the Russian Bolsheviks, and Ōsugi himself reconsidered his cooperation with the Bolshevik faction following Soviet attacks on the Makhnovshchina and the bloody suppression of the Kronstadt rebellion.

Some anarchists were once again driven to terrorism when frustrated by government suppression. This included the Girochinsha (Guillotine Society), a Japanese anarchist group hailing from Osaka, who were involved with revenge killings aimed at Japanese leaders during the mid-1920s. Nakahama Tetsu, an anarchist poet, and member of the Girochinsha, was executed in 1926 for his activities.

Ōsugi Sakae was a translator, and was significant in maintaining a close contact between Japanese anarchists and the wider world. He participated in the 1923 International Workers' Association meeting shortly before his murder.

=== Amakasu Incident ===
By 1923, Ōsugi was a clear leader in the anarchist movement. In response, the state used the turmoil surrounding the 1923 Great Kantō earthquake as a pretext to round up Ōsugi and Itō Noe, who was now his wife. According to writer and activist Harumi Setouchi, Itō, Ōsugi, and his 6-year-old nephew were arrested, beaten to death and thrown into an abandoned well by a squad of military police led by Lieutenant Masahiko Amakasu. According to literary scholar Patricia Morley, Itō and Ōsugi were strangled in their cells.

What both accounts agree on, however, is that both or all of the prisoners were brutally executed without even the formality of a trial, where conviction and death sentence would in the case of the two adults have probably have been a foregone conclusion. This became known as the Amakasu Incident and it sparked much anger, including terrorist actions by groups such as the Girochinsha. The historian John Crump argued that "once again, the most able anarchist of his generation had been murdered", echoing the execution of Kōtoku Shūsui just twelve years prior.

== Development of 'pure' anarchism (1923–1945) ==
=== Influence of Hatta Shūzō ===
After Ōsugi's death, the dominant tendency within Japanese anarchism became 'pure' anarchism. This tendency, which was a form of anarcho-communism, was a reaction to the anarcho-syndicalism favoured by Ōsugi. It was championed by Iwasa Sakutarō and another anarchist named Hatta Shūzō. The label of 'pure' anarchism originated as an attempt to ridicule the perceived arrogance of the ideology, which became appealing to many anarchists because it was seen to be 'unadulterated' by Marxism. The development of pure anarchism contributed to a division in the anarchist movement between pure anarchists and anarcho-syndicalists.

Hatta Shūzō became the most influential figure in Japanese anarchism after 1923, involving himself in the movement from 1924 until 1932. He had been a Christian pastor and advocate of left-wing ideas within his congregation, but was ejected due to holding a memorial service for Ōsugi Sakae. Hatta's influence within the anarchist movement therefore stemmed from his use of his public speaking skills.

Hatta was an archetypal pure anarchist, seeking particularly to eliminate the influences of capitalism and bolshevism. He considered the two as being essentially similar, as Bolshevik industrialisation in Russia involved the same exploitative elements that capitalism did, namely the division of labour and a failure to focus on the livelihood of the people. In much the same way as he found fault in bolshevism, he opposed anarcho-syndicalism because it incorporated labour unions, and was therefore a mirror image of the capitalist division of labour. Instead, Hatta advocated for a decentralised society in which local communes engaged mainly in agriculture and small-scale industry, which he viewed as the only way in which unequal distribution of power could be avoided.

=== Kokuren and Zenkoku Jiren ===
There were two main organisations within the Japanese anarchist movement in the late 1920s: the Kokuren federation, and the Zenkoku Jiren union. The two were closely associated, with their relationship being compared to that between the Spanish FAI federation and CNT union (although Japanese and Spanish anarchists differed in ideology).

Kokuren had its roots in the development of democracy during the Taishō era. In December 1925, a coalition of leftists formed the Farmer-Labour Party to take advantage of the democratic developments. Anarchists opposed this, perceiving political parties of all kinds as being opportunists that ultimately reinforced the state, and so gatecrashed its opening conference. The Party was banned by the authorities on the day of its founding, but the anarchists were encouraged by their success and began to form an organisation of their own. The federation that emerged from this process was the Kokushoku Seinen Renmei ('Black Youth League'), or Kokuren for short, which was formed in January 1926.

While its name indicated an orientation towards youth association, it drew support from a variety of sources, including the labour movement including unions. Early on in its existence, it openly supported the cause of these unions alongside the syndicalist idea of class struggle, although pure anarchists such as Hatta Shūzō were also a part of the organisation from the very start. Kokuren quickly expanded and regional federations appeared across Japan, even extending to Japanese-occupied Korea and Taiwan. Its media organ was the newspaper Kokushoku Seinen ('Black Youth'), which was published from April 1926.

Zenkoku Jiren was a federation of labour unions that was formed in May 1926. In full, it was named Zenkoku Rōdō Kumiai Jiyū Rengōkai ('All-Japan Libertarian Federation of Labour Unions'), and it started off with as many as 8,372 members. The anarcho-syndicalist Ishikawa Sanshirō helped to found it and at its founding it strongly drew from syndicalist ideology, particularly mirroring the French CGT union. Its commitment to 'libertarian federation', which allowed autonomy for member unions to pursue their own disputes freely, was appealing to potential members. This meant that Zenkoku Jiren grew rapidly after its founding, and its members were heavily involved in industrial disputes. The media organ of this organisation was Jiyū Rengō, which was published from June 1926.

Kokuren and Zenkoku Jiren often collaborated in activism, such as a joint campaign against the execution of Sacco and Vanzetti, two Italian anarchists in the United States. Nevertheless, the two differed, with Kokuren being more theoretical in nature and thus more unwilling to compromise. This theoretical nature was emphasised by Hatta Shūzō's influence in the organisation. Hatta published a serialised article in Kokushoku Seinen called 'An Investigation into Syndicalism' in late 1927, which harshly attacked anarcho-syndicalism, and Kokuren quickly became a stronghold of pure anarchism.

=== Division and wartime suppression ===
The tension between the anarcho-syndicalist faction and the pure anarchist faction grew from 1927 onwards. When Zenkoku Jiren mistakenly sent delegates to a conference organised by the Bolshevik Profintern in 1927, Kokuren was highly sceptical of their actions and openly decried 'opportunist' elements within their counterpart. The two sides entrenched, as in June 1927 syndicalists within Kokuren began to publish a newspaper of their own in response to increasing attacks by the pure anarchist majority. A booklet by Iwasa Sakutarō called 'Anarchists Answer Like This', published in July 1927, further provoked the split by criticising anarcho-syndicalist theory such as the idea of class struggle.

In March 1928, Zenkoku Jiren's second national conference took place. The tension between the two factions only grew, despite a call for unity in a January 1928 letter by Augustin Souchy, a secretary of the anarchist International Workers' Association. In response to the furious tone of the debate, and jeering by Kokuren members at the conference, the anarcho-syndicalists opted to secede from Zenkoku Jiren and walked out. Over the next several years, all the anarchist groups took part in a process which involved the separation of the pure- and anarcho-syndicalist factions.

Zenkoku Jiren, now dominated by pure anarchists who rejected syndicalist tactics, believed that unions were not inherently revolutionary. As a result, when they were involved in labour disputes, the organisation directed attention away from the immediate circumstances and towards their long-term goal of an anarchist revolution. Kokuren, on the other hand, engaged in reckless and violent activities to bring this revolution about, leading to a collapse in membership. Every issue of Kokushoku Seinen had been prohibited from sale, and this radicalisation only contributed to its reduction from a nationwide federation to a small group of radicals. The group finally disappeared in 1931.

The anarcho-syndicalists formed several separate groups, eventually culminating in a united organisation called Jikyō for short. In 1931, Jikyō had 3,000 members, compared to the 16,300 members of Zenkoku Jiren. This was the peak membership for both groups, as from 1931 onwards the Japanese state increasingly repressed political dissent following the beginning of war in Manchuria. Hatta Shūzō published his last work in 1932.

In 1934, the two anarchist union federations opted to reunify in a desperate attempt at survival. The reunited Zenkoku Jiren had only four thousand members in 1934 however, and it had halved to just 2,000 by 1935. Another organisation that was created in an attempt to resist state oppression was the 'Anarchist Communist Party' (Nihon Museifu Kyōsantō), formed in January 1934. It compromised upon anarchist principles, and was harshly criticised particularly by Iwasa Sakutarō, who argued that they were "Bolshevik" for adhering to party-style organisation.

In late 1935, the Party attempted a bank robbery to obtain funds. This failed, and the subsequent investigation uncovered the previously-secret Anarchist Communist Party. In response to this discovery, Japanese authorities arrested around 400 anarchists, regardless of whether they were members of the Party. This devastated the anarchist movement, and Zenkoku Jiren was forced to disband in early 1936. Later in 1936, a further 300 anarchists were arrested after the state fabricated a 'Nōseisha incident' named after a different and defunct organisation.

This sort of repression continued and essentially made it impossible for anarchists to organise. The last group to survive was the anarcho-syndicalist Tokyo Printers' Union, which disappeared in 1938. Even after suppression, some Japanese anarchists went on to fight in the Spanish Civil War on behalf of the CNT.

== After World War Two ==
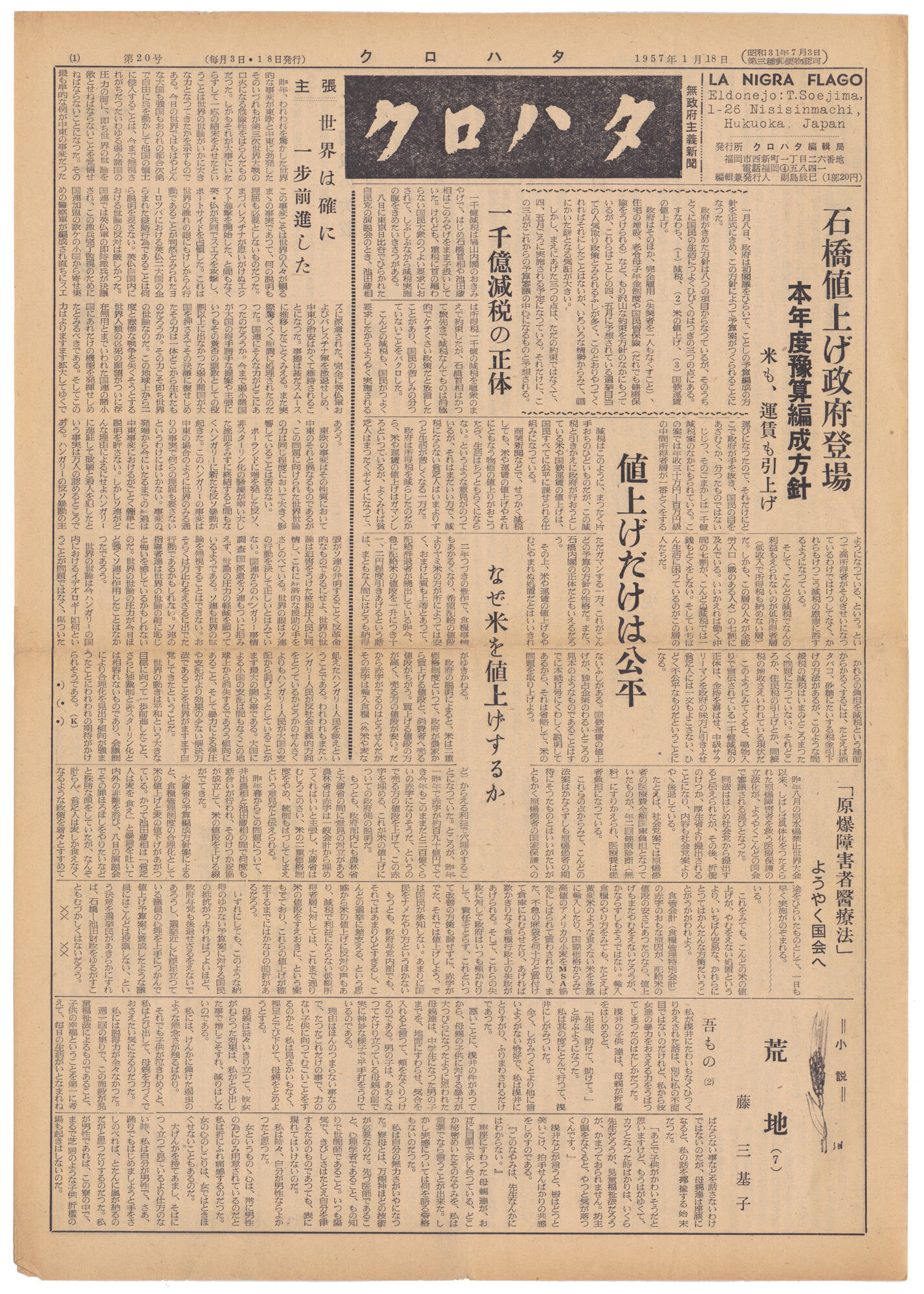
Cover of the first issue of クロハタ (The Black Flag), an anarchist newspaper published in Fukuoka, Japan, in 1957

After the war, Ishikawa Sanshirō wrote Japan 50 Years Later, envisioning Japanese society after an anarchist revolution. In this work, he advocated a mutualist economy on a co-operative basis. He also supported nudism as an expression of freedom, and unlike his contemporary anarchists he endorsed the maintenance of the Japanese Emperor as a symbol of communal affection.

Anarchists were represented in the production control movement from 1945 to 1950, based on factory occupations in pre-war Japan, Italy, and France.

=== Japanese Anarchist Federation ===
Anarchists coalesced into a new Japanese Anarchist Federation in May 1946. Both anarcho-communists and anarcho-syndicalists joined, conscious of trying to mend their pre-war division. Many of the leading figures were the same as before the war, with both Ishikawa Sanshirō and Iwasa Sakutarō participating. Iwasa was elected chairman of the National Committee of the Federation, a chiefly organisational role. In June 1946, they began to publish a journal, named Heimin Shinbun after Kōtoku Shūsui's magazine.

The organisation nonetheless failed to gain much support from the general public, due to a number of factors. Anarchists were discriminated against due to a policy of anti-communism pursued by the American-led Allied occupation force, and anarchists also faced opposition from the Japanese Communist Party and its strong trade union presence. Land reform instituted after the war also effectively eliminated the class of tenant farmers that had formed the core base of the pre-war anarchist movement. The anarchists within the JAF were also divided over their political strategy, quarrelling among themselves frequently. Idealism, rather than the practical considerations of the populace, became the focus of Heimin Shinbun, and this hindered their capacity to muster public support.

Tensions between the 'pure' and syndicalist anarchists resurfaced due to their lack of success. In May 1950, a splitting organisation, the 'Anarcho-Syndicalist Group' (Anaruko Sanjikarisuto Gurūpu) formed. By October 1950, the organisation had firmly split, and was dissolved. In June 1951 the anarcho-communists created a 'Japan Anarchist Club' (Nihon Anakisuto Kurabu). Significantly, Iwasa followed the communists in joining the club, depriving the Federation of a central figure.

==== Refounding ====
By 1956, the Japanese Anarchist Federation had been reformed, albeit without reuniting with the communist faction. In that year, the JAF started publishing a new journal, Kurohata ('Black Flag'), which was later renamed Jiyu-Rengo ('Libertarian Federation'). Within the latter, a new anarchist theorist named Ōsawa Masamichi began to rise to prominence. He advocated a more gradual revolution, focusing on the social and cultural rather than the political. His ideas were controversial, decried by some as 'revisionist', but he firmly established a more reformist strand within the anarchist movement.

As an anarchist movement, the Federation supported direct action on multiple occasions through its lifespan. One of the most significant of these was its participation in the massive Anpo protests in opposition to revision of the U.S.-Japan Security Treaty in 1960. Huge demonstrations swept major cities, and the Sōhyō labor federation and others staged strikes of around 4 to 6 million workers. Nonetheless, the treaty was forced through by the government. Disillusionment with constitutional politics led the 'mainstream' faction of the Zengakuren student movement to join with the JAF in calling for political violence as a form of protest. A similar protest broke out in 1965 against the treaty with South Korea, with a similar result.

Ōsawa commented in Jiyu-Rengo that the government's action was an 'outrage', but that this had happened repeatedly – and that each time a 'threat to parliamentary democracy' was talked about by journalists, two camps of party politicians furiously decried the other's action, but then proceeded to make a truce and ignore the problem. Out of this disillusionment, anarchism gained ground within the protest movement, including the Zenkyoto student power movement created during anti-Vietnam War protests. The rise of protest groups encouraged the Japanese Anarchist Federation to declare 'The Opening of the Era of Direct Action' in 1968. This culminated in the occupation of Tokyo University by anarchist students for several months in 1968.

Despite this, the anarchism espoused by these students was not aligned with that of the JAF. The 'Council of United Struggle' at the university declared that they were "aristocratic anarchists", struggling not on behalf of the worker but for themselves, attempting to deny their own aristocratic attributes by engaging in political struggle. Ōsawa, for example, approved of the use of violent tactics, but feared that it was too separated from the masses, claiming that "it would come to a new Stalinism" even if it did succeed.

The separation of the Japanese Anarchist Federation from the contemporary political protests demonstrated the weakness of the organisation. In 1968, the organisation was finally disbanded. It resolved "creatively to dissolve" in an attempt to formulate new forms of organisation, and announced its dissolution formally in Jiyu-Rengo on the 1st January 1969.

Its anarcho-communist rival, the Japan Anarchist Club, remained active after this point, publishing a journal until March 1980.

== Connection to Korean anarchism ==
Korean and Japanese anarchism developed in close connection to each other. While Korea was under Japanese occupation, Korean radicals were first introduced to anarchism in China and Japan. Due to the development of Japanese left-wing thought and translations of major works, Koreans in Japan often had greater access to both socialist and anarchist materials, bolstering the spread of these ideologies. For instance, Korean anarchist Yi Yongjun was attracted to anarchism through Ōsugi Sakae's translations of the works of anarchist theorist Peter Kropotkin, and was influenced by both Kōtoku Shūsui and the Chinese anarchist Liu Shifu.

One of the primary goals of the Korean anarchist movement was independence from Japanese colonial rule. Despite this, their ultimate goal at all times was the social revolution, rather than just national independence. Attempts to form anarchist organisations in Korea were routinely suppressed by the Japanese colonial government, and so Korean anarchism often developed in Japan itself. Korean activists in Japan often worked in close collaboration with their Japanese counterparts, and several Japanese anarchists, including Sakai Toshihiko, Ōsugi Sakae, Hatta Shūzō, and Iwasa Sakutarō, supported the efforts of these Japan-based Koreans. Ōsugi was particularly influential among this group, and he was a supporter of Korean independence.

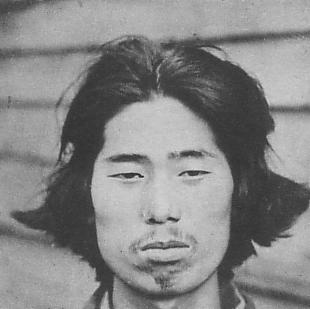
Pak Yol, a Korean anarchist who became involved in anarchist groups in Tokyo

Several organisations were formed by these Japan-based Korean anarchists. This included the Fraternal Society of Koreans (Joseonin chinmokhoe), the "first anarchism-oriented Korean organisation in Japan", which was established in Osaka in 1914. The Black Wave Society (Heukdo hoe) was established in Tokyo in 1921, and was helped by Japanese anarchists too.

The media organ of the Black Wave Society, named Black Wave, was published in Japanese and edited by the Korean anarchist Pak Yol. It proclaimed support for the amalgamation of Japan and Korea, and ultimately the entire world, an idea that stemmed from the prominent transnationalist aspect of Korean anarchist thought in the era. The Japanese anarchist Fumiko Kaneko joined the Society and became involved in a romantic relationship with Bak Yeol, who personally shared her affinity for self-description as a nihilist rather than an anarchist.

Korean anarchists even participated directly in the activities of Japanese anarchists. The Black Movement Society (Heuksaek undongsa) established in 1926 became a registered member of the Japanese Black Youth League (Kokuren). This close connection meant that the split between 'pure' anarchists and anarcho-syndicalists that had occurred in the Japanese organisations was replicated among the Korean movement as well.

=== In China and East Asia ===
Japanese and Korean anarchists alike involved themselves in anarchist struggles in China. Iwasa Sakutarō was among those invited to China, spending two years there from 1927 until 1929. Iwasa, together with other Japanese, Taiwanese, Korean, and Chinese activists, worked together in joint projects such as the Shanghai Labour University, an experiment with new educational institutions and theories.

During his stay in China, Iwasa planned to establish a 'Greater Alliance of East Asian Anarchists'. The idea had originally been proposed by Chinese anarchist Yu Seo in 1926, who had argued against a "mad wave" of patriotism among Korean, Indian, Filipino, Vietnamese and Taiwanese anarchists, demonstrating the huge scope of the idea. In September 1927, this was realised practically, when about 60 anarchists from China, Taiwan, Japan, Korea, Vietnam, and India gathered in Nanjing to organise an 'Eastern Anarchist League'. The League established a headquarters in Shanghai, created a network connecting anarchists across the region, and published a journal called 'The East' (Dongbang), the first issue of which was published in August 1928.

== See also ==
- Category:Japanese anarchists
- List of anarchist movements by region
- Anarchism in China
- Anarchism in Korea
- Anarchism in Taiwan
- Japanese dissidence in 20th-century Imperial Japan
- Girochinsha
- Hajime Matsumoto

== Bibliography ==
- Bowen Raddeker, Hélène (1997). Treacherous Women of Imperial Japan: Patriarchal Fictions, Patricidal Fantasies. London: Routledge. ISBN 9780415171120.
- Bowen Raddeker, Hélène (2009). "Anarchism, Japan". In Ness, I. (ed.). The International Encyclopedia of Revolution and Protest. John Wiley & Sons, Ltd. pp. 1–3. doi:10.1002/9781405198073.wbierp0062. ISBN 9781405198073.
- Crump, John (1993). Hatta Shūzō and Pure Anarchism in Interwar Japan. London: Palgrave Macmillan. doi:10.1007/978-1-349-23038-9. ISBN 978-1-349-23040-2.
- Crump, John (1996a), "Anarchist Communism and Leadership: the case of Iwasa Sakutarō", in Neary, Ian (ed.), Leaders and Leadership in Japan, Japan Library, pp. 155–174
- Cybriwsky, Roman (2011). Historical Dictionary of Tokyo. Scarecrow Press. ISBN 978-0-8108-7489-3.
- Elison, George (1967). "Kōtoku Shūsui: The Change in Thought". Monumenta Nipponica. 22 (3/4): 437–467. doi:10.2307/2383076. JSTOR 2383076.
- Hane, Mikiso (2003) [1982]. "Women Rebels". Peasants, Rebels, Women, and Outcastes: The Underside of Modern Japan (2nd ed.). Maryland: Rowman & Littlefield Publishers. pp. 246–293. ISBN 0-7425-2525-2. LCCN 2002151950.
- Hwang, Dongyoun (2009). "Anarchism, Korea". In Ness, I. (ed.). The International Encyclopedia of Revolution and Protest. John Wiley & Sons, Ltd. pp. 1–3. doi:10.1002/9781405198073.wbierp0063. ISBN 9781405198073.
- Hwang, Dongyoun (2010), "Korean Anarchism before 1945: a regional and transnational approach", in Hirsch, Steven; van der Walt, Lucien (eds.), Anarchism and Syndicalism in the Colonial and Postcolonial World, 1870–1940: The Praxis of National Liberation, Internationalism, and Social Revolution, pp. 95–130, ISBN 978-90-04-18849-5
- Konishi, Sho (2007). "Reopening the "Opening of Japan": A Russian-Japanese Revolutionary Encounter and the Vision of Anarchist Progress". The American Historical Review. 112 (1): 101–130. doi:10.1086/ahr.112.1.101. ISSN 1937-5239.
- Marshall, Peter H. (1993). "Japan". Demanding the Impossible. London: Fontana Press. pp. 523–527. ISBN 978-0-00-686245-1. OCLC 1042028128.
- Morley, Patricia (1999). The Mountain is Moving: Japanese Women's Lives. University of British Columbia Press. ISBN 9780774806756.
- Morton, Leith (2004). Modernism in Practice: An Introduction to Postwar Japanese Poetry. University of Hawai'i Press. ISBN 9780824827380. JSTOR j.ctvvn3p8.
- Nelson, David G. (2009a). "Ishikawa Sanshirō (1876–1956)". In Ness, I. (ed.). The International Encyclopedia of Revolution and Protest. John Wiley & Sons, Ltd. p. 1. doi:10.1002/9781405198073.wbierp0784. ISBN 9781405198073.
- Nelson, David G. (2009b). "Ōsugi Sakae (1885–1923)". In Ness, I. (ed.). The International Encyclopedia of Revolution and Protest. John Wiley & Sons, Ltd. pp. 1–2. doi:10.1002/9781405198073.wbierp1132. ISBN 9781405198073.
- Nelson, David G. (2009c). "Itō Noe (1895–1923)". In Ness, I. (ed.). The International Encyclopedia of Revolution and Protest. John Wiley & Sons, Ltd. pp. 1–2. doi:10.1002/9781405198073.wbierp0802. ISBN 9781405198073.
- Notehelfer, Frederick George (1971). "Chapter 4: Pacifist opposition to the Russo-Japanese War, 1903–5". Kōtoku Shūsui: Portrait of a Japanese Radical. Cambridge: Cambridge University Press. ISBN 978-0-521-07989-1. LCCN 76134620. OCLC 142930.
- Reich, Pauline C.; Fukuda, Atsuko (1976). "Japan's Literary Feminists: The 'Seito' Group". Signs. 2 (1): 280–291. doi:10.1086/493355. JSTOR 3173444. S2CID 144035101.
- Setouchi, Harumi (1993). Beauty in Disarray (1st ed.). Rutland, Vermont: Charles E. Tuttle Company. ISBN 0-8048-1866-5.
- Sievers, Sharon L. (1983). Flowers in Salt: The Beginnings of Feminist Consciousness in Modern Japan. Stanford: Stanford University Press. pp. 114–188. ISBN 0-8047-1165-8. LCCN 82-60104.
- Tsuzuki, Chushichi (1966). "Kotoku, Osugi, and Japanese Anarchism". Hitotsubashi Journal of Social Studies. 3 (1): 30–42. doi:10.15057/8492.
- Tsuzuki, Chushichi (1970). "Anarchism in Japan". Government and Opposition. 5 (4): 501–522. doi:10.1111/j.1477-7053.1970.tb00513.x. S2CID 144716648. (Also published in Apter, David E.; Joll, James, eds. (1971). Anarchism Today. London: Palgrave Macmillan. pp. 105–126. ISBN 978-0-333-12041-5. OCLC 195124.)
