= The Chrysanthemum and the Guillotine =

2018 film

- Film poster
- Directed by: Takahisa Zeze
- Screenplay by: Takahisa Zeze; Toranosuke Aizawa
- Produced by: Kazunao Sakaguchi
- Starring: Shun Sugata; Masahiro Higashide; Arata Iura; Kyusaku Shimada
- Narrated by: Masatoshi Nagase
- Cinematography: Atsuhiro Nabeshima
- Edited by: Ryo Hayano
- Music by: Goro Yasukawa
- Production companies: Stance Company; Kokuei Company
- Release date: July 7, 2018 (Japan)
- Running time: 189 minutes
- Country: Japan
- Language: Japanese

The Chrysanthemum and the Guillotine (Japanese: 菊とギロチン, Hepburn: Kiku to girochin) is a 2018 Japanese film directed by Takahisa Zeze about women's sumo wrestling and anarchism after the 1923 Great Kantō earthquake. The film was produced by Kazunao Sakaguchi.

The film won the Busan Film Festival's Bright East Films Award while in production in 2016. The film premiered in North America during New York City's 2019 CineCina film festival.

== Plot ==
After the 1923 Great Kanto earthquake, Tomoyo Hanagiku runs away from her abusive husband and joins a women's sumo group. She meets a group of young people a part of an anarchist group called the Guillotine Association, and connect over shared ideas of an equal and free society. To earn money, Tomoyo tours the country with the sumo group she joined by doing shows.

== Cast ==
- Shun Sugata as Maruman
- Masatoshi Nagase as Narrator
- Masahiro Higashide as Tetsu Nakahama
- Arata Iura as Genjiro Muraki
- Kyusaku Shimada as Hanbee Tanaka
- Kanichiro Sato as Daijirō Furuta
- Kiyohiko Shibukawa as Tamasaburo Iwaki
- Shohei Uno as Kazuo Morimoto
- Ryo Ikeda as Kozo Kawai
- Takashi Yamanaka as Kyutaro Wada
- Tomoki Kimura as Maichi Naka
- Tatsushi Omori as Matsutaro Shoriki
- Yota Kawase as Kantaro Sakata
- Yoko Kamon as Mitsu Tamatsubaki
- Ayaka Onishi as Katsu Katsutora
- Maho Yamada as Haru Kozakura
- Hanae Kan as Tamae Tokachigawa
- Haruki Takano as Kichiji

== See also ==
- Girochinsha
