= Iwasa Sakutarō =

Japanese anarchist

Sakutarō Iwasa
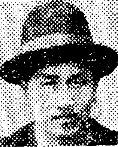
- Born: September 25, 1879; Chiba Prefecture, Japan
- Died: February 13, 1967 (aged 87)

Sakutarō Iwasa (岩佐 作太郎, Iwasa Sakutarō; 1879–1967) was a Japanese anarchist who was involved in the Japanese anarchist movement during the 20th century. Living until the age of 87, he was significant in influencing Japanese anarchists towards his anarcho-communist variety of 'pure' anarchism.

It was said about him after his death that "the road which the aged Iwasa walked, extending through the Meiji, Taishō and pre-war and post-war Shōwa eras, was the history of the Japanese anarchist movement itself."

== Early life ==
Sakutarō Iwasa was born in 1879, in a farming hamlet in Chiba Prefecture in Japan. His father was a wealthy land-owning farmer, and was the headman of five villages. His grandfather had been too, and had encouraged communal production on the farms which he oversaw, resulting in a "half-communist village". This influenced Iwasa to believe in the possibility of anarchist forms of organisation from a young age.

He received a traditional primary education, but dropped out of middle school due to boredom with his studies. He progressed to Tokyo Law College, and wished to drop out once more, but his mother encouraged him to press on to graduation in 1898. He was exposed to Christianity, but did not himself become Christian, arguing that "Jesus was a person. Buddha and Confucius were persons. And I am a person too."

Iwasa was well-connected due to his father's wealth and position, and was able to lodge in the houses of a number of influential politicians. Upon doing so, however, he became disillusioned with their behaviour and with conventional politics altogether.

== Political career ==
=== Time in the USA ===
In 1901, he moved to the United States, where he was to remain until 1914. During this period, his ideology developed into anarcho-communism, and he was particularly radicalised by the Russo-Japanese War as many other Japanese anarchists such as Kōtoku Shūsui were. Kōtoku visited the US in 1905–1906, where he founded a 'Social Revolutionary Party' (or Shakai Kakumei Tō) amongst Japanese immigrants in California. Iwasa joined the Party, which was strongly inspired by terrorist elements such as the contemporary Social Revolutionaries in Russia.

During his time in the organisation, he likely participated in the writing of an 'Open Letter' addressed to Emperor Meiji threatening his assassination in 1907. He denied involvement in the letter, but he later openly supported the cause of Kōtoku when he was implicated in a conspiracy to assassinate the Emperor in 1910. Upon the execution of his friend in the aftermath of the trial, Iwasa was reportedly so shocked that he immediately became impotent at the age of 31.

=== Return to Japan ===
He eventually returned to Japan in June 1914 when he was informed that his mother was ill. Upon arrival to his family home, he was placed under house arrest for five years, with constant police surveillance. This was during the fuyu jidai or 'winter period' of anarchist politics in Japan, during which the state harshly cracked down upon anarchism and anarchist militants.

In 1919, the 'winter period' came to an end, and Iwasa was able to move to Tokyo. There, he returned to anarchist agitation, attending meetings, writing and distributing journals and organising the movement. One of the first groups he involved himself in was the 'Labour Movement' (Rōdō Undō), which involved other notable individuals such as Ōsugi Sakae and Itō Noe. He was imprisoned for six months due to his involvement in a later short-lived socialist league in the early 1920s.

Compared to the more anarcho-syndicalist views of activists such as Ōsugi, Sakutarō Iwasa was an advocate of anarcho-communism due to his skepticism of labour unions. Alongside Hatta Shūzō, he was one of the key advocates of what was labelled 'pure anarchism', so-called due to its opposition to 'contamination' by Marxist ideas.

=== Splits and suppression ===
In January 1926, a federation of anarchist militants called Kokuren was formed, and a federation of unions called Zenkoku Jiren was formed in May 1926. In these organisations, the tension between anarcho-syndicalists and pure anarchists developed into a broader rivalry. In 1927, Iwasa published his book titled Anarchists Answer Like This, which criticised the idea of class struggle, and provoked the division between these two factions.

The split was affirmed in 1928 when, at the second conference of Zenkoku Jiren, anarcho-syndicalists walked out due to jeering and the antagonistic relationship between the two factions. Iwasa had been in China from 1927 until November 1929, participating in anarchist struggles in that country such as the Labour University in Shanghai, and so was not directly involved in that division (although his influence did contribute to it).

Following the invasion of Manchuria in 1931, the state became more militaristic and oppressive, and anarchism became a particular target. An attempt to continue the anarchist movement even against government repression resulted in the formation of the 'Anarchist Communist Party of Japan' in 1934. Regardless, Iwasa remained firmly opposed to centralised party organisation, and he criticised the party as "complete rubbish" and "not anarchist, but bolshevik".

In 1935, he attempted to make a living by opening a cafe in Tokyo. When this failed, he returned to his native village and grew his own food until the end of WW2.

=== After WW2 ===
After the end of the war, Sakutarō Iwasa was amongst those who returned to the anarchist movement, and he became influential once more. He was elected chairman of the National Committee of the Japanese Anarchist Federation when it was formed in May 1946, a largely organisational role. Despite this position of power, he advised himself and others against "thinking of yourselves as important". One way in which he fulfilled this was by hanging placards around his neck to advertise anarchist journals on his long journeys throughout Japan to help organise the Federation.

The Federation struggled to find success in the political climate of post-war Japan, and split into two factions. The successor group from the 'pure anarchist' faction was the Japanese Anarchist Club, and was centred around Iwasa and other 'pure' anarchists who had survived the war. He remained influential in the group until his death, and it continued to adhere to his anarcho-communist ideology.

== Death and legacy ==
Sakutarō Iwasa died in 1967, at the age of 87. He was described by other anarchists as having been "held in esteem as high as the mountains and the stars", and even his political opponents such as Yamakawa Kikue noted that he was an 'eternal youth'. He had inspired respect from his peers from a young age, becoming known as 'Iwasa Rō (老)', a term of respect literally translated as 'the aged Iwasa', by the age of 25–26.

=== Ideology ===
Iwasa was a firm believer in anarcho-communism, influenced by thinkers such as Peter Kropotkin. As such, he endorsed the motto "From each according to his ability, to each according to his needs", and believed in anti-authoritarianism. He opposed centralised authority, whether in the attempted 'Anarchist Communist Party', or through syndicalist methods of revolution, resulting in his labelling as a 'pure anarchist'.

One of his criticisms of syndicalist organising methods was his 'labour union mountain bandit theory'. In this theory, he argued that the relationship between labour unions and their capitalist employers was essentially similar to the relationship between the members of a gang of bandits and its leader. Anarchists believe that capitalism is essentially exploitative, just as bandits exploit their victims. Iwasa's analogy therefore argued that, regardless of whether the members of the gang were in charge of its operations, the gang would still pillage those around it; and in much the same way, even if labour unions take charge of a company, the nature of capitalism would remain exploitative. This harsh criticism of labour unions was significant in influencing the Japanese anarchist movement away from syndicalist methods.

=== Works ===
- Workers and the Masses (1925)
- Anarchists Answer Like This (1927)
- Random Thoughts on Revolution (1931)
- One Anarchist's Recollections (posthumous, 1983)
