= Nature's Web =

1992 book by Peter Marshall

- Author: Peter Marshall
- Subject: History of the environmental movement
- Publisher: Simon and Schuster
- Publication date: 1992
- Pages: 524
- ISBN: 0-671-71065-6

Nature's Web: Rethinking Our Place on Earth is a 1992 book by Peter Marshall on the history of the environmental movement. Its original subtitle, "An Exploration of Ecological Thinking", was renamed in its 1994 Paragon House printing.

== Bibliography ==
- Christie, D. (November 1994). "Rev. of Nature's Web: Rethinking our place on earth by Peter Marshall". Choice. 32 (3): 469. ISSN 0009-4978. ProQuest 225867800.
- Clark, John (1994). "Peter Marshall's 'Nature's Web'". Anarchist Studies. 2 (2): 137. ISSN 0967-3393. ProQuest 1308739306.
- Elbers, Joan S. (April 15, 1994). "Rev. of Nature's Web: Rethinking Our Place on Earth by Peter Marshall". Library Journal. 119 (7): 80. ISSN 0363-0277. ProQuest 196739097.
- Goldsmith, Edward (May 1993). "In praise of the 'seely spider' -- Nature's Web: An Exploration of Ecological Thinking by Peter Marshall". The Ecologist. Vol. 23, no. 3. p. 113. ISSN 0261-3131. ProQuest 234910830.
- Sarjeant, William A. S. (January 1, 1997). "'Nature's Web: Rethinking Our Place on Earth', Peter Marshall (book Review)". The Structurist. 37: 84–89. ISSN 0081-6027. ProQuest 1297887057.
- Schwarz, Walter (December 19, 1992). "How Green Were Our Values". The Guardian. p. 125. ISSN 0261-3077. ProQuest 244740659.
- Seaman, Donna (July 1994). "Nature's Way". The Booklist. 90 (21): 1906. ISSN 0006-7385. ProQuest 235334278.
- Simpson, Steven (1996). "Review of Nature's Web: Rethinking Our Place on Earth; Historical Ecology: Cultural Knowledge and Changing Landscapes". Environmental History. 1 (1): 106–108. doi:10.2307/3985066. ISSN 1084-5453. JSTOR 3985066.
- Stephens, Piers H. G. (1998). "Peter Marshall, 'Nature's Web: Rethinking Our Place on Earth' (Book Review)". Environmental Politics. 7 (3): 144. doi:10.1080/09644019808414414. ISSN 0964-4016. ProQuest 1877136711.
- Stuttaford, Genevieve (March 28, 1994). "Nonfiction -- Nature's Web: Rethinking Our Place on Earth by Peter Marshall". Publishers Weekly. 241 (13): 78. ISSN 0000-0019. ProQuest 196972577.
- Volokh, Alexander (March 1995). "How green is our valley?". Reason. Vol. 26, no. 10. p. 59. ISSN 0048-6906. ProQuest 203364821.
- Welsh, Ian (1995). "Green Anarchism: Peter Marshall's Nature's Web". Environmental Values. 4 (1): 73–78. ISSN 0963-2719. JSTOR 30301396. ProQuest 61374472.
