= Guillotine Society =

Japanese anarchist group

- ギロチン社
- Leader: Nakahama Tetsu
- Dates active: 1922–1926
- Country: Japan
- Ideology: Anarchism; Illegalism
- Political position: Far-left

The Guillotine Society (Japanese: ギロチン社, romanized: Girochinsha) was a Japanese anarchist terrorist group that carried out a series of unsuccessful assassination attempts during the 1920s. Among the group's targets were the prince of Wales Edward Windsor, the Japanese crown prince Hirohito and the Imperial Japanese Army officers Masahiko Amakasu and Masatarō Fukuda.

== Establishment ==
In the early 20th century, the Japanese anarchist movement developed a variety of different strategies to engage in anti-state and anti-authoritarian activism. Two strands that emerged at this time were anarcho-syndicalism and anarchist terrorism, which each sought to bring about an immediate social revolution.

In the early 1920s, some followers of the anarchist theorist Ōsugi Sakae began carrying out acts of terrorism. In the summer of 1921, one member of his circle made plans to assassinate prime minister Hara Takashi, but the prime minister was ultimately assassinated by the far-right nationalist Nakaoka Kon'ichi and ultranationalism supplanted anarchism as the predominant terrorist movement in Japan. In 1922, other followers of Ōsugi Sakae made plans to assassinate the prince of Wales Edward Windsor while he was on a state visit to Japan, but they were unsuccessful. This group then established the Guillotine Society (Japanese: ギロチン社, romanized: Girochinsha), a secret society with the stated aim of assassinating the crown prince Hirohito. They adopted the French anarchist ideology of illegalism, which advocated for individuals to take direct action against capitalism and the state.

== Assassination attempts ==
Following the 1923 Kantō Massacre, during which Japanese military police murdered Ōsugi Sakae and his partner Itō Noe, many Japanese anarchists sought revenge for their deaths and turned to terrorism. The Guillotine Society was the most prominent anarchist terrorist group of this period. It promoted symbolic bombings and targeted assassinations against state officials of the Empire of Japan, although its own attempts at carrying out such attacks were unsuccessful.

In the mid-1920s, Guillotine Society members Furuta Daijirō and Nakahama Tetsu put together a plot to assassinate the Hirohito. Seeking revenge for the murder of Ōsugi and Itō, they travelled to Korea to purchase explosives for their assassination attempt. To raise money for the attempt, in October 1923, they carried out a bank robbery, during which they killed a bank clerk. This was the only death caused by Japanese anarchists in the history of the movement. Their plot was uncovered and the two anarchists were hanged.

Guillotine Society member Kōgō Tanaka then attempted to assassinate Masahiko Amakasu, the Imperial Japanese Army who was responsible for the murder of Ōsugi and Itō, but this attempt was likewise unsuccessful. In September 1924, the Guillotine Society carried out two attempts to assassinate Masatarō Fukuda, the army general in command of the troops who murdered Ōsugi and Itō: Kyūtarō Wada shot and wounded Masatarō, but failed to kill him; another member bombed his house, but he was not home at the time the explosive detonated. Kyūtarō was sentenced to life imprisonment for the attempt, and he committed suicide in his cell in 1928.

== Legacy ==
The Guillotine Society was ultimately suppressed by the Imperial Japanese police and military. Like other anarchist terrorist groups of the period, the Guillotine Society was short-lived. Nakahama Tetsu, who was a close friend of the author Takeo Arishima, gained recognition as a "terrorist poet". The group is portrayed in the 2018 film The Chrysanthemum and the Guillotine.

== Bibliography ==
- Bowen Raddeker, Hélène (1997). "Commentary: martyrs, nihilists and other rebel heroes". Treacherous Women of Imperial Japan. Patriarchal Fictions, Patricidal Fantasies. Routledge. pp. 89–106.
- Crump, John (1993). "Japanese Anarchism to 1923". Hatta Shūzō and Pure Anarchism in Interwar Japan. Palgrave Macmillan. pp. 21–44. doi:10.1007/978-1-349-23038-9_2. ISBN 978-1-349-23040-2.
- Crump, John (1998) [1996]. The anarchist movement in Japan. Anarchist Communist Editions. Vol. 8. Anarchist Communist Federation. OCLC 1291426646 – via Libcom.org.
- Kemp, Michael (2018). "Ghosts and the Feast". Bombs, Bullets and Bread: The Politics of Anarchist Terrorism Worldwide, 1866–1926. McFarland & Company. pp. 16–36. ISBN 978-1-4766-3211-7. OCLC 1043054028.
- Kramm, Robert (March 2021). "Trans-Imperial Anarchism: Cooperatist communalist theory and practice in imperial Japan". Modern Asian Studies. 55 (2): 552–586. doi:10.1017/S0026749X19000337. ISSN 0026-749X. ProQuest 2575744065.
- Morton, Leith (2004). "The Expression of Despair Arishima Takeo's Modernist Poetry". Modernism in Practice: An Introduction to Postwar Japanese Poetry. University of Hawaii Press. pp. 34–52. doi:10.1515/9780824844561-004.
- Sánchez-Cuenca, Ignacio (2019). The Historical Roots of Political Violence. Cambridge University Press. doi:10.1017/9781108697699. ISBN 9781108697699.
- Tsuzuki, Chushichi (1966). "Kotoku, Osugi, and Japanese Anarchism". Hitotsubashi Journal of Social Studies. 3 (1): 30–42. JSTOR 43294202.
- Tsuzuki, Chushichi (1970). "Anarchism in Japan". Government and Opposition. 5 (4): 501–522. doi:10.1111/j.1477-7053.1970.tb00513.x. ISSN 0017-257X.
