= William Godwin (biography) =

1984 biography by Peter Marshall

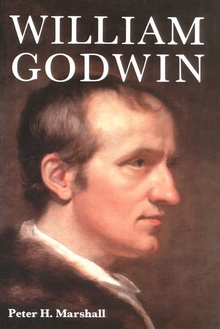
- Author: Peter H. Marshall
- Subject: Biography
- Publisher: Yale University Press
- Publication date: 1984
- Pages: 497
- ISBN: 978-0-300-03175-1

William Godwin is a biography of the British philosopher William Godwin (1756–1836) written by Peter Marshall and first published in 1984 by Yale University Press.

== Bibliography ==
- Bromwich, David (October 21, 1984). "Perfectibilitarian". The New York Times. ISSN 0362-4331.
- Chandler, James K. (1987). "Review of William Godwin". The Modern Language Review. 82 (1): 173–176. doi:10.2307/3729932. ISSN 0026-7937. JSTOR 3729932.
- Claeys, Gregory (1987). "Godwinian Enthusiasms". The Historical Journal. 30 (3): 759–764. doi:10.1017/S0018246X00021014. ISSN 0018-246X. JSTOR 2639172. S2CID 248819589.
- Clark, John P. (1985). "Review of William Godwin". Criticism. 27 (3): 320–324. ISSN 0011-1589. JSTOR 23110377.
- Dinwiddy, J. R. (1987). "Review of William Godwin". The English Historical Review. 102 (403): 506–507. ISSN 0013-8266. JSTOR 572356.
- Himmelfarb, Gertrude (December 31, 1984). "The Compleat Utopian". The New Republic. Vol. 191, no. 27. p. 25. ISSN 0028-6583. ProQuest 198835123.
- Kilcup, Rodney W. (1986). "Calvinist and Atheist". The Review of Politics. 48 (1): 133–135. doi:10.1017/S0034670500037608. ISSN 0034-6705. JSTOR 1406856. S2CID 144167673.
- Kramnick, Isaac (1985). "Review of William Godwin". Albion: A Quarterly Journal Concerned with British Studies. 17 (1): 88–90. doi:10.2307/4049356. ISSN 0095-1390. JSTOR 4049356.
- McCracken, David (1986). "Review of William Godwin". Modern Philology. 84 (1): 99–101. doi:10.1086/391527. ISSN 0026-8232. JSTOR 436974.
- "Peter Marshall". Gale Literature: Contemporary Authors. Gale. 2008. Gale H1000112972.
- Royle, Edward (1985). "Review of William Godwin". History. 70 (230): 524–525. ISSN 0018-2648. JSTOR 24415573.
- Simon, Linda (August 1984). "William Godwin (Book)". Library Journal. 109 (13): 1441. ISSN 0363-0277. EBSCOhost 7495216.
- Stocking, Marion K. (1985). "Review of William Godwin". The Wordsworth Circle. 16 (4): 190–192. doi:10.1086/TWC24041255. ISSN 0043-8006. JSTOR 24041255.
- Thorslev, Peter L. (1988). "Review of William Godwin". Studies in Romanticism. 27 (3): 457–462. doi:10.2307/25600734. ISSN 0039-3762. JSTOR 25600734.
- Tysdahl, B. J. (1986). "Review of William Godwin". Eighteenth-Century Studies. 19 (3): 435–437. doi:10.2307/2738942. ISSN 0013-2586. JSTOR 2738942.
- Wardle, Ralph M. (1986). "Review of The Life of John Hamilton Reynolds; William Godwin". Keats-Shelley Journal. 35: 205–207. ISSN 0453-4387. JSTOR 30212974.
