= Squatting in Taiwan =

Illegal occupation of property in Taiwan

Taiwan on globe

Squatting in Taiwan is the occupation of unused land or derelict buildings without the permission of the owner. Squatting was fuelled by migrants from China from the 1950s onwards and in addition cities such as the capital Taipei were swelled by internal migrants from the countryside. In order to create Daan Forest Park, 12,000 squatters were evicted. The informal settlement at Treasure Hill has been recognized as cultural heritage.

== History ==
From the 1950s onwards, many immigrants from China squatted on public land in Taiwan, in informal settlements. The government began to rehouse the squatters from the 1970s onwards, demolishing 900 settlements by 1984. In 2006, it mandated the removal of squatters under the Principles for the Disposal of Occupied National Public Use Real-Estate Managed by Administrative Authorities, with no provision for alternative housing.

== Taipei ==
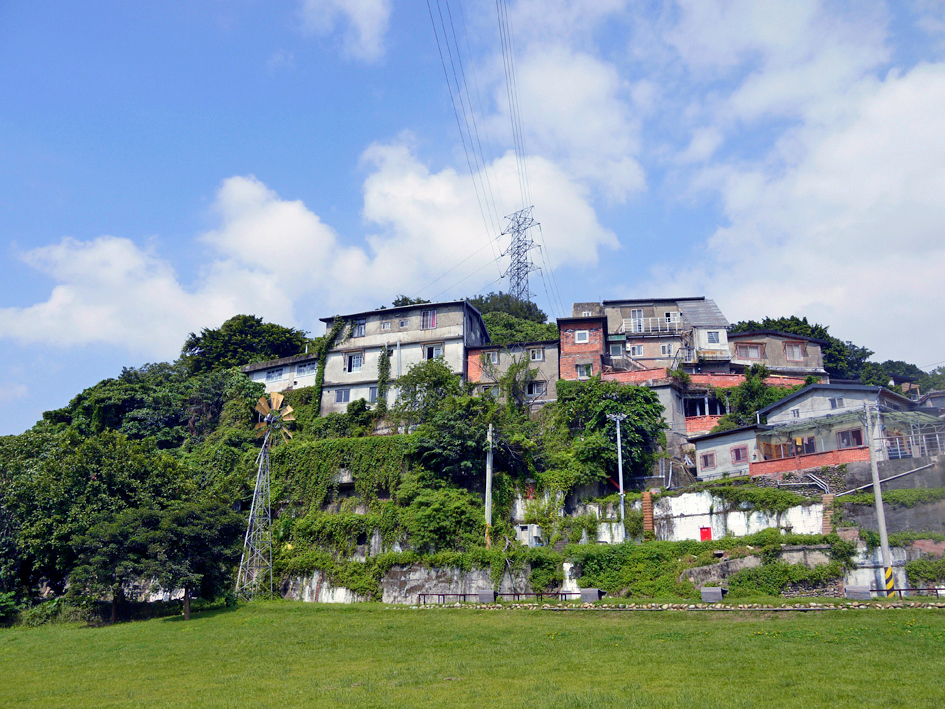
Treasure Hill in 2011

The capital Taipei grew rapidly as more immigrants arrived and also migrants from rural areas moved to the city; in 1989 the Public Housing Department estimated there were 196 hectares of land occupied by squatters. In 1997, the clearance of 996 squatter households on land reserved for parks 14 and 15 beside the Linsen North Road resulted in the suicide of an elderly squatter. Daan Forest Park was created in the 1990s after 12,000 squatters were evicted to make way for it.

Squatting at Treasure Hill began in the 1940s when farmers illegally occupied hilly land. By the 1980s, there were 200 houses in the informal settlement and the authorities began an eviction process, which then stalled. The settlement was then recognized as cultural heritage and turned into an artist village, which opened in 2010. Ruin Academy is an occupied building used as an architectural research centre.
