= Hatta Shūzō =

Japanese anarchist (1886–1934)

- 八太 舟三
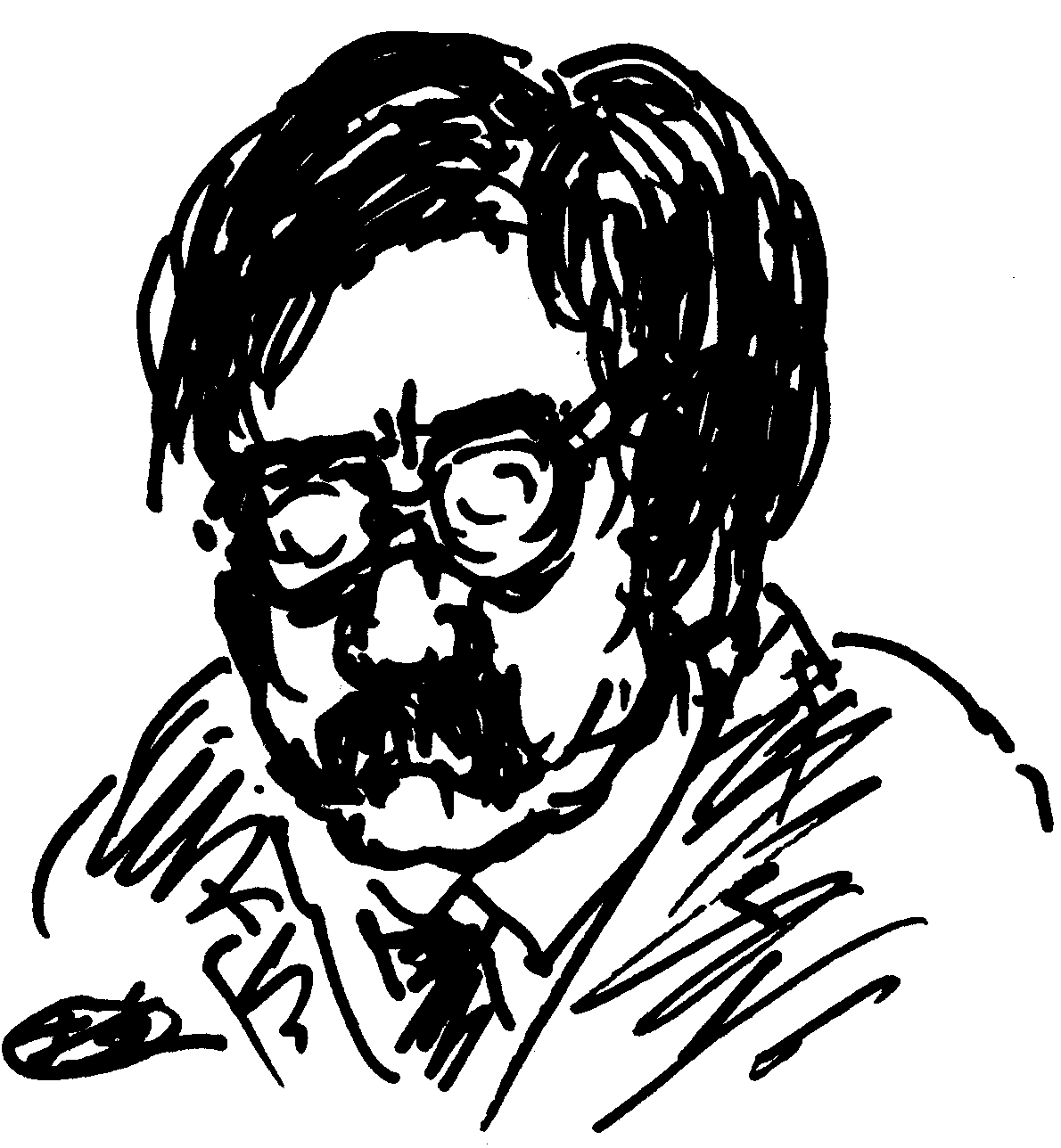
- Sketch of Hatta by Kei Mochizuki
- Born: 11 December 1886; Tsu, Mie, Japan
- Died: 30 January 1934 (aged 47); Tokyo, Japan
- Movement: Anarchism in Japan

Hatta Shūzō (Japanese: 八太 舟三; 1886–1934) was a Japanese anarchist communist, known as one of the principal theorists of anarchism in Japan and the main proponent of "pure anarchism" in the movement.

Born into a family associated with the old Tokugawa shogunate, Hatta was denied access to education from an early age and began working in order to pay for his schooling. While working as a paperboy in Taiwan, he converted to Christianity and returned to Japan to train as a Presbyterian minister. After completing his theological education, he preached in rural villages throughout Japan, before settling in a congregation in Hiroshima. There he became involved with the nascent labour movement, through which he renounced Christianity and became an anarchist.

He went to Tokyo, where he lived in extreme poverty and began to suffer from alcoholism. Despite the conditions he lived in, he became a prolific anarchist writer and public speaker, using the rhetorical skills he developed as a preacher to convince people of anarchist communism. A staunch anti-capitalist, he was critical of other anarchist tendencies that he believed were susceptible to capitalist influence, particularly that of anarcho-syndicalism. He called for the establishment of a "pure anarchism", purged of any capitalist or statist influences.

By the 1930s, the anarchist movement was being fiercely repressed by the Imperial authorities and Hatta's health was deteriorating. In desperation, he attempted to mend the divide between the pure anarchists and the syndicalists, but this - combined with his re-conversion to Christianity - alienated his remaining anarchist comrades. After his death, he was remembered as one of the leading voices of anarchism in Japan and as an influential theorist in the development of anarchist communism.

== Biography ==
=== Early life and education ===
Hatta Shūzō was born on 11 December 1886 in Tsu, a port city in the Mie Prefecture of the Empire of Japan. His parents died while he was very young, leaving him the youngest of seven orphans. His family had been loyal to the Tōdō clan and managed the finances of the Tsu Domain, before the Meiji Restoration abolished the feudal clan structure. As the Tōdō clan had been on the side of the deposed Tokugawa shogunate, the Hatta family was blocked from a number of opportunities by the new government.

Shūzō attempted to educate himself in commerce at a school in Kobe, but he was unable to continue his education after his family's money ran out. He moved to Tokyo, where he attempted to pay for his education by working as a paperboy, but this didn't provide him with enough money to do so. He then took up work as a sailor, which brought him to Taiwan, only recently ceded to Japan after the First Sino-Japanese War. There he found it easier to acquire a job, taking a position at the post office in Taipei, but he quickly lost it after an argument with his employer. By this time, he had converted to Christianity and decided to return to Japan to join the nascent Protestant movement.

Although the authorities of the Meiji era had welcomed western military technology, which they thought would strengthen the nation's defense capabilities, they were highly suspicious of Christianity and other western ideologies. Christianity was popular among disaffected Japanese students, while Protestantism in particular gained a following due to its engagement in social work. Most of the founders of the Social Democratic Party, with the exception of one Kotoku Shusui, were Christian socialists who saw Christianity and socialism and synonymous. As these Christian missionaries offered a cheaper education that other universities, in 1905, Hatta enrolled in the Meiji Gakuin University, where he studied theology, participated in a number of student societies and became friends with Toyohiko Kagawa. Together with Toyohiko, in 1910, Hatta transferred to a theological school in Kobe, where he completed his studies in theology in 1912.

=== Clerical career ===
Now a member of the Presbyterian clergy, Hatta preached the gospel in the Chūbu and Chūgoku regions of Japan. His congregations were small and were supported largely by foreign donations, which meant he had to work hard to maintain a dedicated following. As the majority of the population wasn't convinced of Christianity, he also developed into a skilled rhetorician and became increasingly passionate about his social work. By March 1915, he had converted twelve people in a rural village of Gifu Prefecture, which he reported was suffering from such extreme poverty that local tenant farmers were increasingly forcing their daughters to train as geisha. He also concluded that rural areas were "fertile soil" for the spread of Christianity, as the close-knit relationships in these areas meant that one conversion could quickly lead to many more. He contrasted this with the difficulty of converting people in cities, where individualism was more prevalent. During this time, Hatta married a young graduate from a theology school in Yokohama. The couple had two children: a son, Tetsuro, and a daughter, Yohana. Likely the product of an arranged marriage, the couple were unhappy together and Hatta had numerous affairs, even while he was a priest.

In April 1919, he began preaching in Yamaguchi, where he began to become disillusioned with Christianity, as he felt that the church had proved unable to adequately respond to the social unrest of the period. In August 1920, he left Yamaguchi for the industrial centre of Hiroshima, where the local labour movement was growing in size and influence. About forty people attended his church, where he gave sermons and cultural lectures with such eloquence that he was compared favourably to the period's leading evangelists, Toyohiko Kagawa and Uchimura Kanzō. Some members of his congregation expressed regret that more people were not there to here him speak, describing his rhetorical style as "like the Bible talking in the spirit of pure socialism". While his sermons were particularly popular with the young people in his congregation, many in the older generation worried that their priest was antagonising the city's wealthy and powerful.

He began to use his church to support the local labour movement and came to advocate for the abolition of capitalism and the state, gradually moving away from Christianity and towards the political philosophy of anarchism. When he began giving lectures on the labour movement, the city's newspapers began running hit pieces against him, attacking Hatta's socialism as "unpatriotic" and even "the work of the devil". The newspapers also publicised details about his affairs, leading to a drop in the congregation's membership, particularly from its older members. After the murder of Ōsugi Sakae, Hatta organised a memorial service in his honour, which prompted both the city authorities and his own church's clerical hierarchy to order his banishment from Hiroshima. Despite his wife's prayers for the contrary, he renounced Christianity and dedicated himself fully to anarchist activism. In September 1924, he left for Tokyo, leaving behind both his congregation and his family.

=== Anarchist activism ===
Back in the Japanese capital, Hatta found it difficult to make a living as a known anarchist militant. He managed to earn a small amount of money translating books such as Peter Kropotkin's Ethics: Origin and Development and Mikhail Bakunin's God and the State, but his income from this front was limited. He supplemented his income by practicing ryaku (Japanese: 略, lit. 'to capture'), an anarchist term - derived from Kropotkin's The Conquest of Bread - used to describe the practice of extortion against wealth capitalists. He initially stayed at a homeless shelter ran by Toyohiko Kagawa, before finding residence in Setagaya. During this period, Toyohiko described Hatta as an "incredibly sorry figure", wearing shabby clothes, covered in a rash and often drunk on sake. At this time, Hatta lived with Waka Hirose, with whom he had two children. He often violently attacked her, even when she was holding one of their babies, as he suspected her of having an affair. His biographer John Crump described his treatment of Waka as "inexcusable and totally at variance with the very principles he expounded."

Despite his alcoholic and violent temperament, Hatta gained popularity as a prolific writer of anarchist theory, passionate public speaker and enthusiastic labour organiser. Kei Mochizuki wrote that he could quickly recover from an alcoholic stupor the moment people gathered to hear him, upon which he would give an animated speech. In one account, Saburō Daidōji described a trip that Hatta took to a small village in the Tōhoku region, where he spoke to farmers for hours on the subject of anarchist communism, "mov[ing] them to tears [and] fill[ing] them with anger". In this Hatta demonstrated not only his talents as an orator, but also the receptibility of Japanese farmers to the philosophy of anarchist communism. For his speaking and writing abilities, Hatta's contemporaries came to regard him as "the greatest theoretician of anarchist communism in Japan."

As Japan developed into the region's dominant power, with a vast domestic production capacity and an expanding colonial empire in Korea and the South Pacific, Hatta began to predict the inevitability of a Second World War if the Japanese Empire continue to grow unchecked. Concerned fundamentally with the development of Japanese capitalism, he often argued with anarchists that disagreed with his interpretations of it, particularly with anarcho-syndicalists. This prompted him to develop a form of anarchist communism that he called "pure anarchism", which he believed constituted a complete break from capitalism.

=== Later life and death ===
By the end of Hatta's career as an anarchist theorist in 1932, repression against the Japanese anarchist movement had intensified to an extreme, while his own poverty and chronic alcoholism caused his health to deteriorate. In desperation at the situation, Hatta's later writings reversed his previous intransigence and argued for the integration of pure anarchists into the labour movement. He believed that their focus should be on "conflicts occurring within capitalism" rather than a "struggle against capitalism", as the latter had become increasingly difficult due to repression against the movement. Hatta also converted back to Christianity and again began attending church, although he remaining critical of traditional Christian doctrine.

Unable to afford medical treatment for his illness, Hatta Shuzo died on 30 January 1934. In his obituary published in Jiyu Rengo Shinbun, he was described as a "former anarchist polemicist". Although few of his anarchist comrades attended his funeral, it was attended by Toyohiko Kagawa and Hatta's ex-wife, while Waka Hirose had herself been hospitalised giving birth to their second child. Waka eventually returned to work as a cleaner at the council offices in Setagaya.

== Political thought ==
Hatta called for the abolition of capitalism, along with the exploitation of labour, national chauvinism and centralisation of power inherent to the capitalist system. He likewise warned against the rise of Bolshevism, which he considered to be little more than another form of capitalism and a smokescreen for the despotism of a centralised government.

Hatta saw it as necessary for anarchists to not only confront their enemies of capitalism and Bolshevism, but also to purge their ranks of enemy influence and establish a kind of "pure anarchism". Hatta positioned this pure anarchism in counterposition to the anarcho-syndicalists, who he saw as adopting elements of scientific socialism and democratic centralism from the Bolsheviks; as well as the agrarian anarchists, who considered there to be a fundamental conflict between urban and rural areas that resulted in the exploitation of farmers by urban workers. He argued against the perceived neutrality of the scientific method, which he considered to be a product of capitalism, as well as "artificial organisational theor[ies]", which he believed ran counter to free association. He came to consider syndicalism to be a reflection of the capitalist system and that it could not provide an alternative to it, as he felt a syndicalist economy would inevitably replicate the division of labour and economic inequality inherent to capitalism. In contrast, he argued that the class conflict between farmers and urban workers only existed because of the capitalist division of labour, concluding that farmers and industrial workers ought to unite to dissolve the capitalist system, including cities themselves.

Hatta ultimately envisioned a decentralised society of self-sustaining communes, which would engage in both agriculture and "small-scale industry". Its production would be determined only by consumption, rather than being dictated by a need for economic growth. He believed that a society constituted in this manner would be free from any division of labour, social inequality or state control. He also believed that as this anarchist communism would be a complete break from capitalism, it would not be possible for capitalist property relations to reconstitute themselves. He thought that such a society couldn't be brought about through elections or traditional class struggle, but would require a social revolution by the "propertyless masses", particularly tenant farmers.

== Legacy ==
After Hatta's death, the anarchist magazine Museifushugi Undō remembered him as someone who "really loved to discuss and was a person fired with passion. You could say he had the atmosphere of a revolutionary about him, burning for the ideal of anarchism and always with young people gathered round him." Ryuji Komatsu described him as "no mere educator of the masses or activist. Still less was he a mere researcher or philosopher. His assertions and ideas all came about within the movement or in connection with the movement. Furthermore, he devoted all his energy not merely to shouting at those around him, but to taking responsibility for his own assertions and trying to embody them in his own life and activity. In that sense, Hatta was without doubt a thinker."

In 1939, Toyohiko Kagawa published his autobiographical novel Taking a Stone As My Pillow, in which he depicted Hatta through the character of "Yagi Shūzō", a "renegade clergyman" who left his wife and children in Hiroshima for a life of poverty in Tokyo. Japanese New Leftist Ryu Ota later held Hatta Shūzō up as the only anarchist, "not only in Japan but in the entire world", to have developed the theory of anarchist communism further than Peter Kropotkin.

Hatta's grave has been lost, as his home town of Tsu was destroyed during the air raids on Japan. The Hatta family continues to live in Tsu, although Hatta Shuzo has been largely forgotten by the later generations.

== Bibliography ==
- Bowen Raddeker, Hélène (2009). "Anarchism, Japan". In Ness, I. (ed.). The International Encyclopedia of Revolution and Protest. John Wiley & Sons, Ltd. pp. 1–3. doi:10.1002/9781405198073.wbierp0062. ISBN 9781405198073.
- Crump, John (1993). Hatta Shuzo and Pure Anarchism in Interwar Japan. St. Martin's Press. doi:10.1007/978-1-349-23038-9. ISBN 978-0-312-10631-7. LCCN 93-26328.
- Marshall, Peter H. (1993). "Japan". Demanding the Impossible. London: Fontana Press. pp. 523–527. ISBN 978-0-00-686245-1. OCLC 1042028128.
