= Treasure Hill =

Community in Taipei, Taiwan

- 寶藏巖
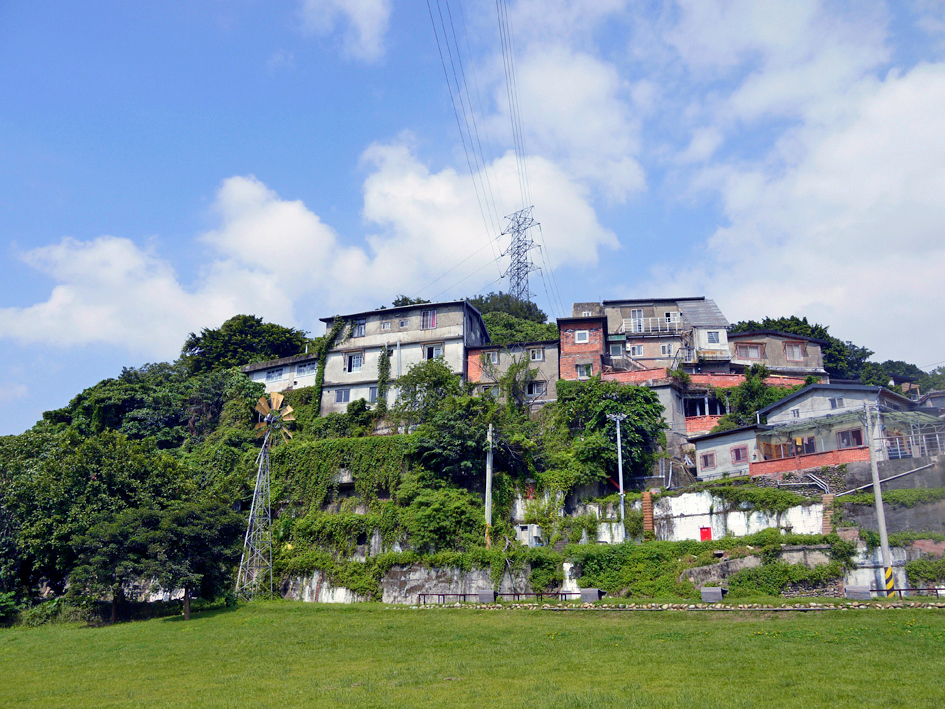
- Treasure Hill, 2011
- Interactive map of Treasure Hill
- Location: Zhongzheng District, Taipei, Taiwan
- Coordinates: 25°0′37.92″N 121°31′59.32″E
- Type: Military dependents' village

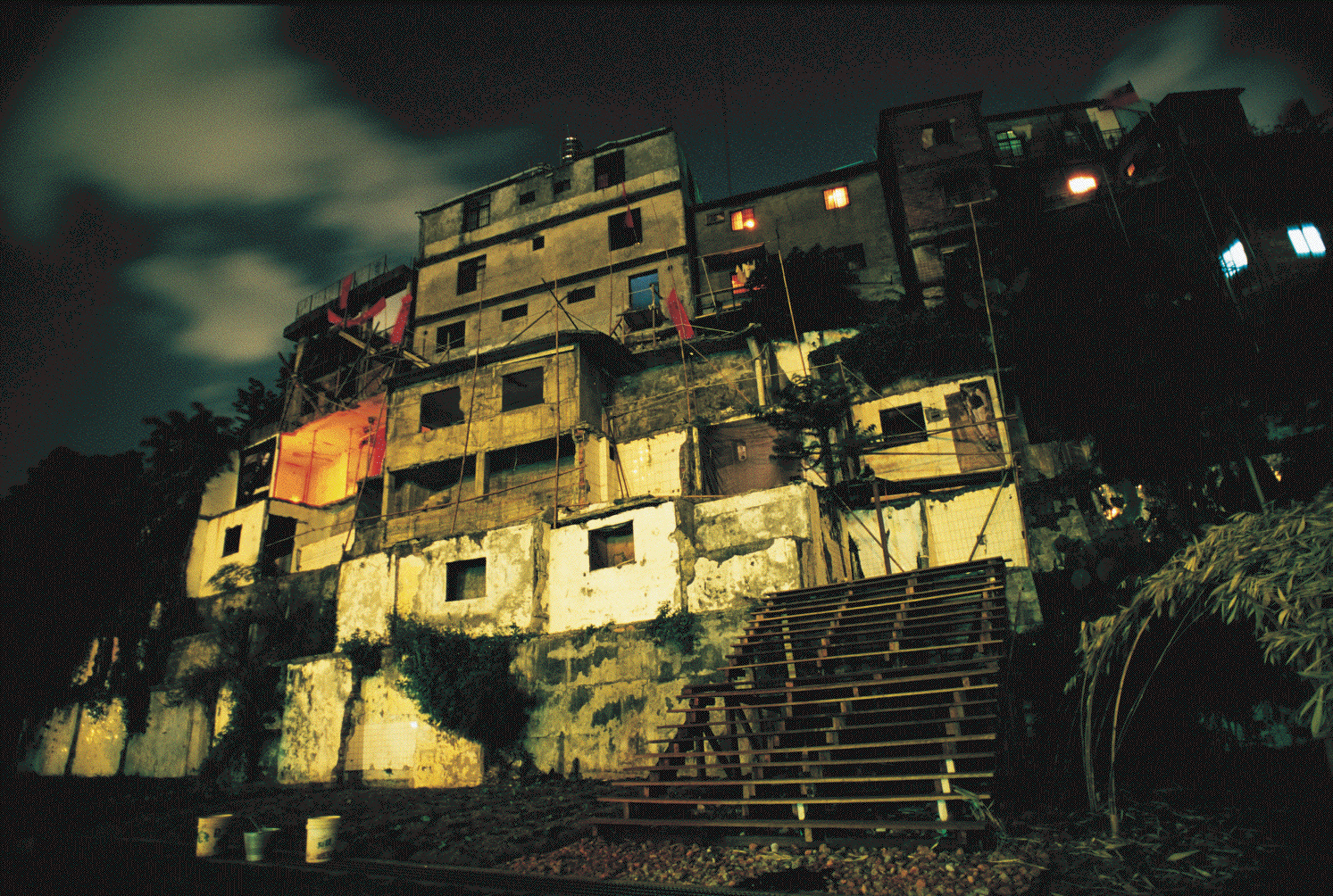
Treasure Hill, 2003

Treasure Hill (Chinese: 寶藏巖; pinyin: Bǎozàng Yán; Pe̍h-ōe-jī: Pó-chōng-giâm) is a community in Taipei, Taiwan. Originally an illegal settlement, it was founded by Kuomintang military veterans at the end of the 1940s and initially served as an anti-aircraft position. It is located by the Xindian River, which was once an important lifeline for the settlement, providing drinking water, fish, and gravel for construction work before the river became polluted. The community used to have extensive urban farms between the settlement and the river.

In 2006, Treasure Hill was featured in The New York Times as one of Taiwan's must-see destinations.

The police closed the area in 2007 in order to guarantee safety for restoration work, which the Taipei City Government undertook in cooperation with the non-governmental organization Global Artivists Participation Project, developing the area into an example of an environmentally sustainable urban community. With a policy of preservation and revitalization, the old settlement unfolded a new vision of an artivist compound that would respect the existing fabric of the community while incorporating production and ecology, adding a youth hostel.

Commissioned by the municipal government to propose an ecological masterplan for the area, the Finnish architect Marco Casagrande found that the settlement, perhaps because of its illegal and marginal status, had evolved organically to operate according to an ecological model: recycling and filtering grey water, using minimal amounts of electricity ("stolen" from the city grid), composting organic waste, and repurposing Taipei's waste. Casagrande related his experiences of working on the site: "For the ecological urban laboratory I had to do nothing, it was already there. What I did was to construct wooden stairways and connections between the destroyed houses and some shelters for the old residents to play mah-jong and ping-pong."

Treasure Hill is the attic of Taipei carrying the memories, stories and traditions of the past generations. In some way it is a reflection of the Taipei mind that the industrial city is not able to reflect. For the stories to surface the industrial city must be turned over: the city must be a compost. —Marco Casagrande

The restored Treasure Hill reopened as an artist village in 2010, with only 22 original families managing to move back to the settlement. The restoration process was later criticized for stripping the neighbourhood of its prior residents and turning into a space that celebrates individual expression and artistic creativity at the expense of housing lower-income families.

== Transportation ==
Treasure Hill is within walking distance of Gongguan Station of the Taipei Metro.

== See also ==
- Military dependents' village
