= Demanding the Impossible =

1992 history book by Peter Marshall

- First edition
- Author: Peter Marshall
- Cover artist: Francisco Goya's 1814 painting The Third of May 1808
- Published: 1992 (HarperCollins)
- ISBN: 0-00-217855-9

Demanding the Impossible is a book on the history of anarchism by Peter Marshall. An updated edition was published by PM Press in 2009.
