= Peter Marshall (travel writer) =

British author, philosopher, and historian (born 1946)

Peter Marshall FRGS
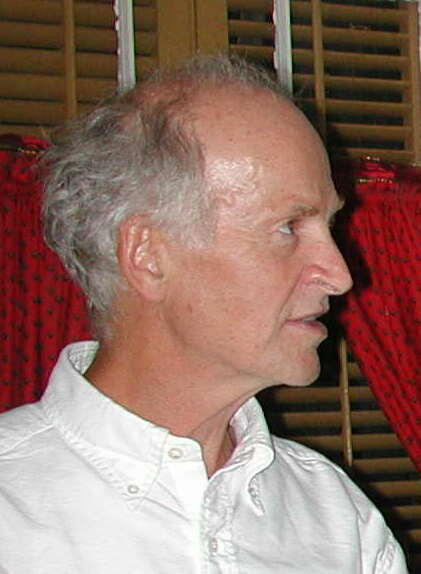
- Marshall in 2006
- Born: Peter Hugh Marshall; 23 August 1946 (age 80); Bognor Regis, England
- Education: University of London (BA); University of Sussex (MA, PhD)
- Occupation: Author
- Notable work: Demanding the Impossible; William Godwin
- Website: petermarshall.net

Peter Hugh Marshall FRGS (born 23 August 1946) is an English author of over a dozen works of philosophy, history, biography, travel writing, and poetry. He is best known for his 1991 history of anarchism, Demanding the Impossible, and his 1984 biography of William Godwin.

== Early life and career ==
Peter Marshall was born in Bognor Regis, England, on 23 August 1946 to the horse trainer William and Vera Marshall. He received a bachelor's degree from the University of London in 1970 and his master's and doctorate from the University of Sussex in 1971 and 1977, respectively. During his studies, Marshall taught English for a year in Dakar, Senegal, served two years in the British Merchant Navy, and was a University of London tutor in philosophy and literature, which he continued after receiving his doctorate. In 1981, he became a tutor in philosophy at the University College of North Wales, where he continued until 1990 and published books on William Godwin, William Blake, Tanzania, and Cuba. Following his Godwin biography, Marshall edited two more works on the radical British philosopher.

In the 1990s, Marshall wrote a history of anarchism, Demanding the Impossible, and a history of the environmental movement, Nature's Web. He considers these two his most important and influential works, though his personal favourite is Riding the Wind, which asserts his spiritual philosophy of "liberation ecology". Marshall's additional travel books addressed Africa, Ireland, and the Maldives. He created a six-hour documentary, Voyage Around Africa on his circumnavigation of the continent. In the 2000s, he authored several books on alchemy, astrology, and magic. Marshall has written for The Observer, The Guardian, The Independent, New Statesman, and the Times Literary Supplement. He also works as a radio and television broadcaster and has appeared on the History Channel. Resurgence magazine named Marshall's Nature's Web among their most essential books of the late 20th century.

== Personal life ==
Marshall was married to radio broadcaster Jenny Therese Zobel. They had two children. He remarried in 2008 to photographer and lecturer, Liz Ashton Hill. They live in East Devon by the sea.

== Works ==
- William Godwin: Philosopher, Novelist, Revolutionary (New Haven: Yale University Press, 1984)
- Journey through Tanzania, with photographers Mohamed Amin & Duncan Willetts (London: Bodley Head, 1984)
- Into Cuba with photographer Barry Lewis (London: Zena, 1985)
- (ed), The Anarchist Writings of William Godwin (London: Freedom Press, 1986)
- Cuba Libre: Breaking the Chains? (London: Victor Gollancz, 1987)
- William Blake: Visionary Anarchist (London: Freedom Press, 1988)
- Demanding the Impossible: A History of Anarchism (London: HarperCollins, 1991)
- Nature's Web: An Exploration of Ecological Thinking (London: Simon & Schuster, 1992)
- Journey through Maldives, with photographers Mohamed Amin & Duncan Willetts (Nairobi: Camerapix,1992)
- Around Africa: From the Pillars of Hercules to the Strait of Gibraltar (London: Simon & Schuster, 1994)
- Celtic Gold: A Voyage Around Ireland (London: Sinclair Stevenson, 1997)
- Riding the Wind: A New Philosophy for a New Era (London: Continuum, 1998)
- The Philosopher's Stone: A Quest for the Secrets of Alchemy (London: Macmillan, 2001) ISBN 9780330489102
- World Astrology: The Astrologer's Quest to Understand the Human Character (London: Macmillan, 2003)
- Europe's Lost Civilization: Uncovering the Mysteries of the Megaliths (London: Headline, 2004)
- The Theatre of the World: Alchemy, Astrology and Magic in Renaissance Prague (London: Harvill Secker, 2006). Also published as The Magic Circle of Rudolf II: Alchemy and Astrology in Renaissance Prague (New York: Walker & Co., 2006) and The Mercurial Emperor: The Magic Circle of Rudolf II in Renaissance Prague (London: Pimlico, 2007)
- Poseidon's Realm: A Voyage Around the Aegean (London: Zena Publications, 2016)
- Bognor Boy: How I Became an Anarchist (London: Zena Publications, 2018)
