= Bug Dome =

Bamboo shelter in Shenzhen, China

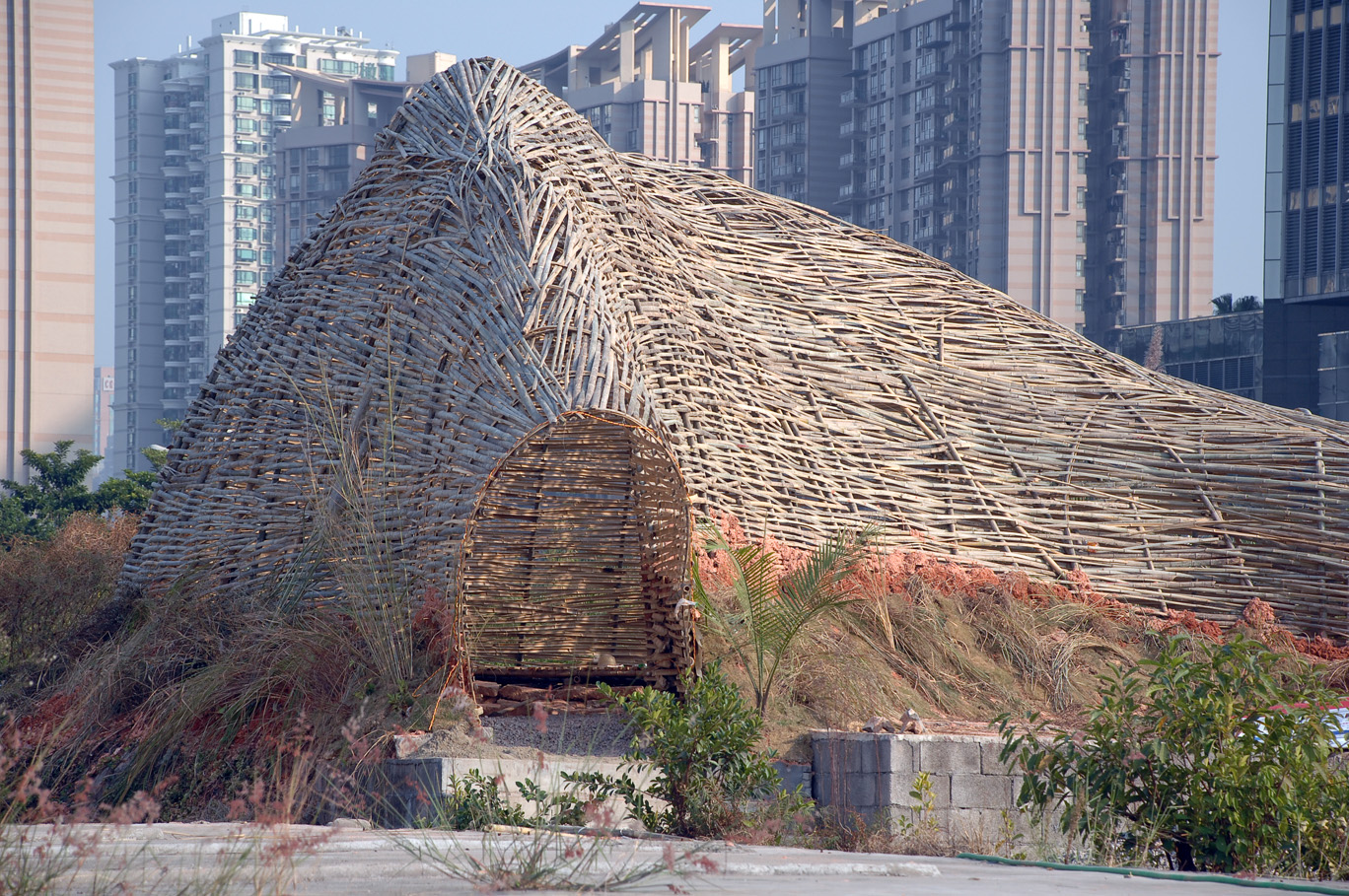
Bug Dome at the Shenzhen & Hong Kong bi-city Biennale of Urbanism/Architecture in Shenzhen 2009.

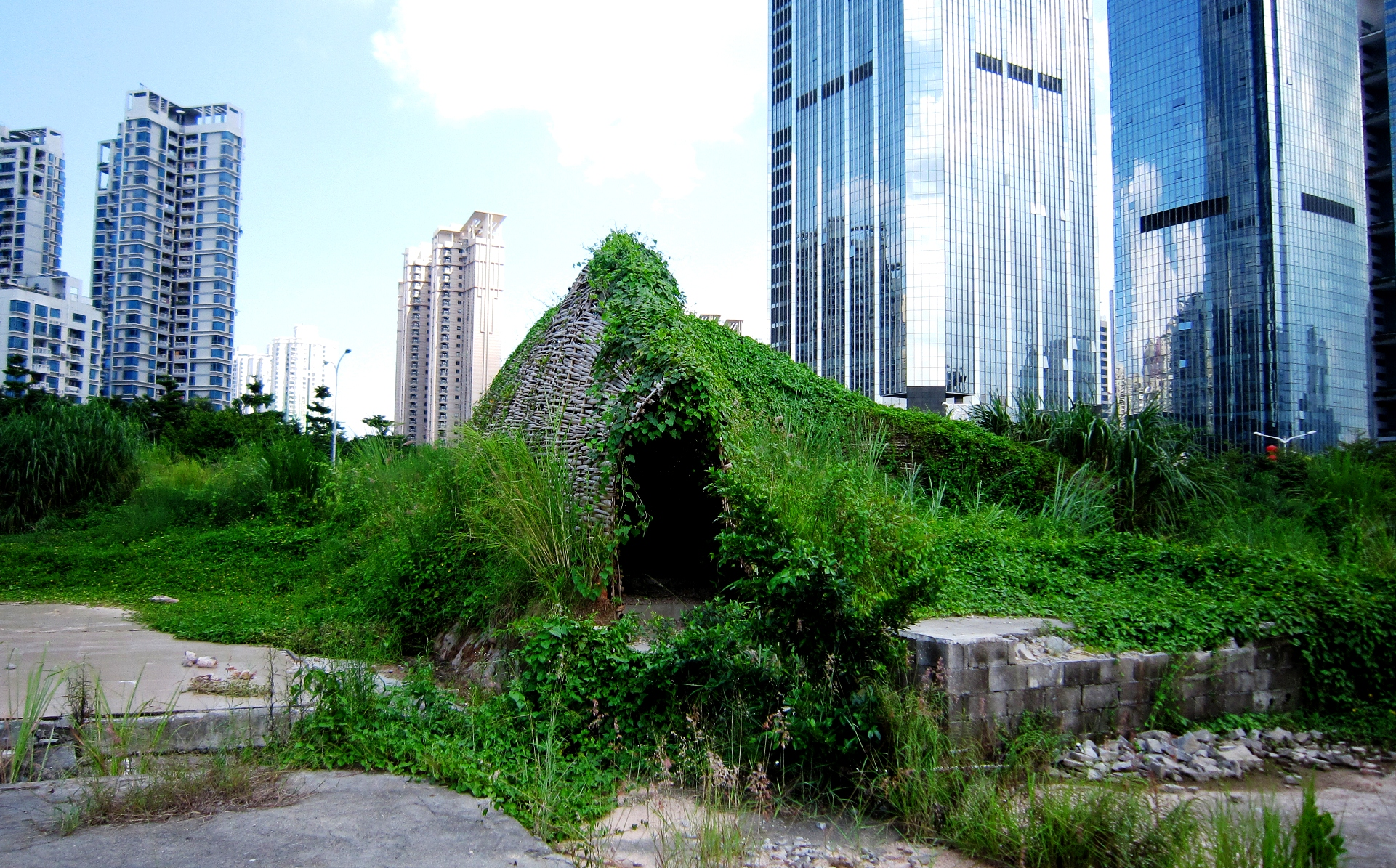
Bug Dome covered by creepers surrounded by Shenzhen skyscrapers.

Bug Dome was a bamboo shelter created for the Shenzhen & Hong Kong bi-city Biennale of Urbanism/Architecture in Shenzhen 2009, China by a group of architects calling themselves WEAK!

The Bug Dome was inspired by the homes built by insects. It was designed to be a sheltered area where underground band performances, poetry readings, and discussions could take place during the SZHK Biennale. After the Biennale, the shelter continued to be used as gathering place for illegal workers from the Chinese countryside, many of whom were living in nearby shelters and abandoned buildings.

WEAK! was a collaboration of Hsieh Ying-Chun, a Taiwan architectural activist specializing at collaborative construction and sustainable construction, Roan Ching-Yueh, an architect, curator and art critic, and Marco Casagrande, a Finnish architect, founder of C-lab. The WEAK! architects create their projects by recomposing existing materials with minimal effort to total impact. The 'bug dome' was constructed out of bamboo and weak concrete in the form of cement mixed with soil.

All the necessary materials were collected from around the building site and will return to the natural environment when the Dome is no longer needed.
