= Hsieh Ying-chun =

Taiwanese architect

Hsieh Ying-chun 謝英俊
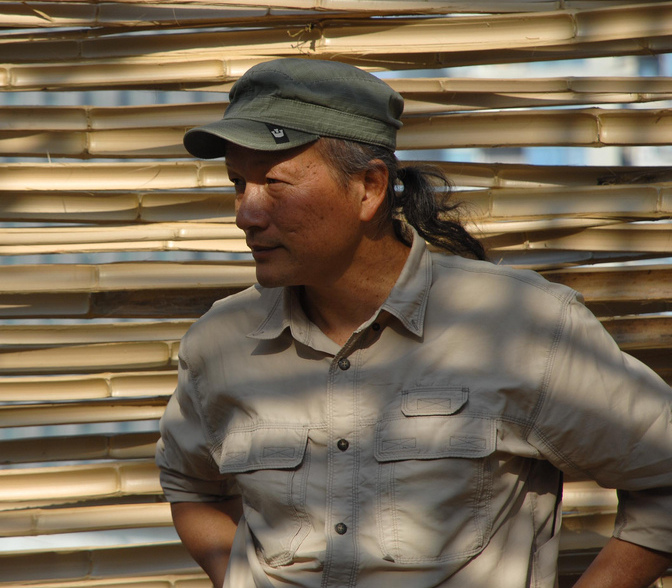
- Born: 1954 (age 71–72); Taichung County, Taiwan
- Occupation: Architect
- Awards: Curry Stone Design Prize 2011

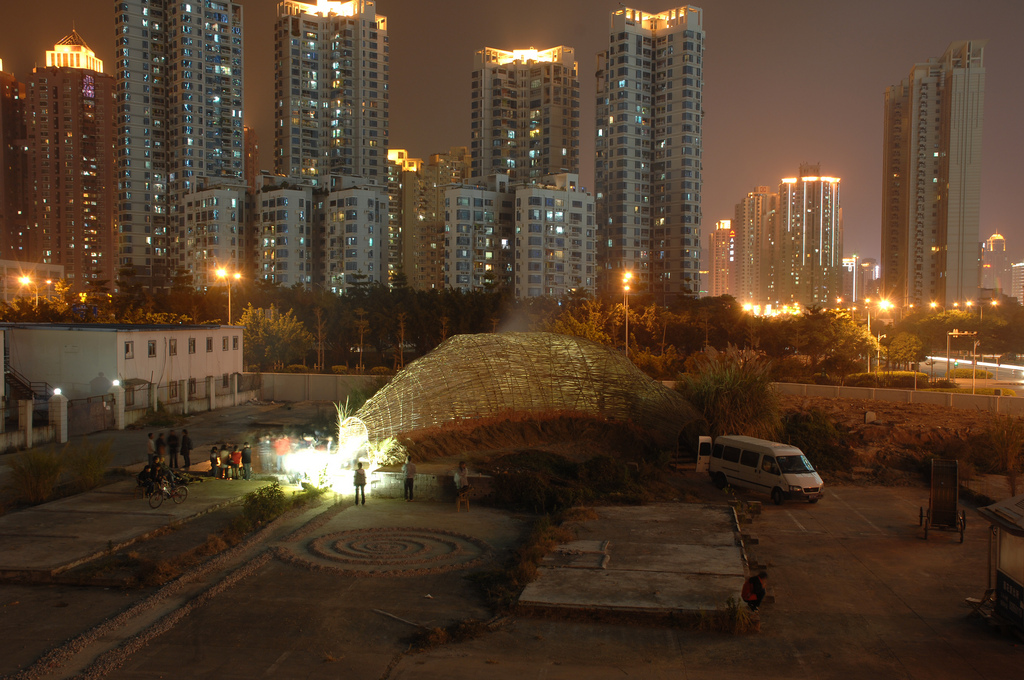
Bug Dome by WEAK! in Shenzhen, 2009.

Hsieh Ying-chun (Chinese: 謝英俊; pinyin: Xiè Yīngjùn; born 1954 in Taichung County, Taiwan) is a Taiwanese architect and contractor.

In his socially engaged work Hsieh has been helping people rebuild their homes since the devastating earthquake in Taiwan 1999, when his reconstruction project for the Thao people gained him international recognition. Hsieh organized the reconstruction of housing and communities in disaster-struck areas while faced with two challenges: to build houses within an extremely tight budget (25%-50% of the market price) and to base the projects on the notion of sustainable construction, green building, cultural preservation and creation of local employment opportunities. Hsieh has played a key role in rebuilding communities for Taiwan's Indigenous peoples.

In more recent years, Hsieh has continued to help people build their own houses, from the remote villages of China to the sufferers of the South East Asian Tsunami.

When we face the future challenge of environmental crisis, a one-dimensional technical thought process is inadequate; the considerations must be broadened to cultural, economical, and environmental levels.

Hsieh represented Taiwan in the Venice Architecture Biennale 2006 and Venice Biennale of Contemporary Art 2009. Hsieh is part of the architectural team WEAK! together with Roan Ching-yueh and Marco Casagrande. The WEAK! operates an independent architectural research centre Ruin Academy as their headquarters in Taipei.

The Curry Stone Design Prize 2011 was awarded to Hsieh to champion the designer as a force of social change building more than 3 000 homes with local people in natural disaster zones in Taiwan and mainland China.
