= Roan Ching-yueh =

Taiwanese architect and academic

Roan Ching-yueh 阮慶岳
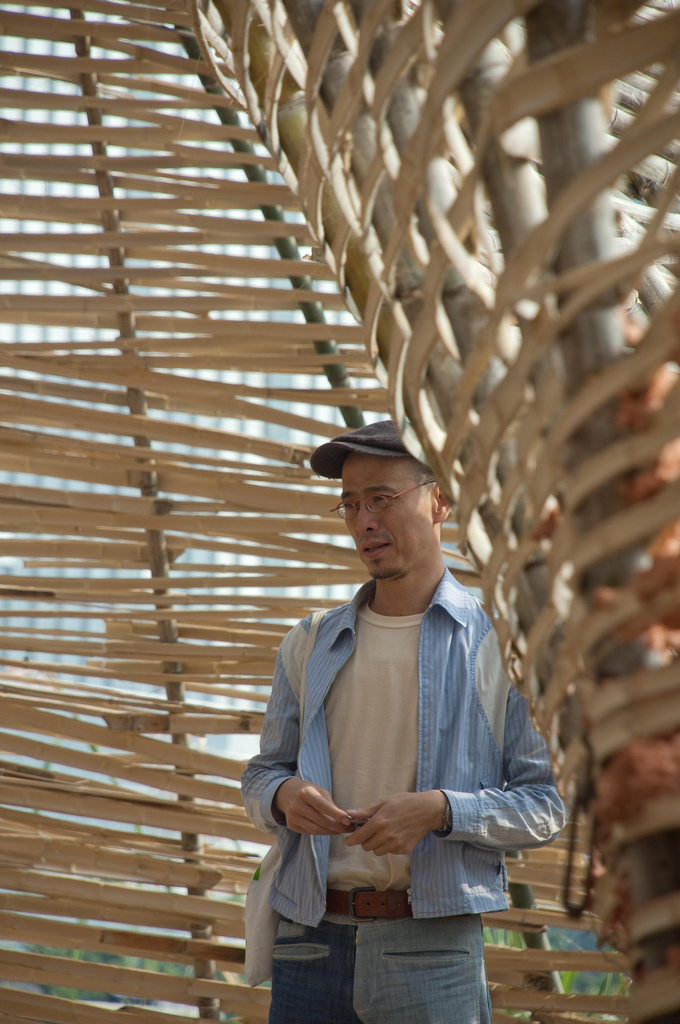
- Born: 1957 (age 68–69); Pingtung, Taiwan
- Occupation: Architect
- Awards: Taiwan Literature Awards 2001; Taipei Literature Awards 2003; Wu Yongfu Literature Awards 2003

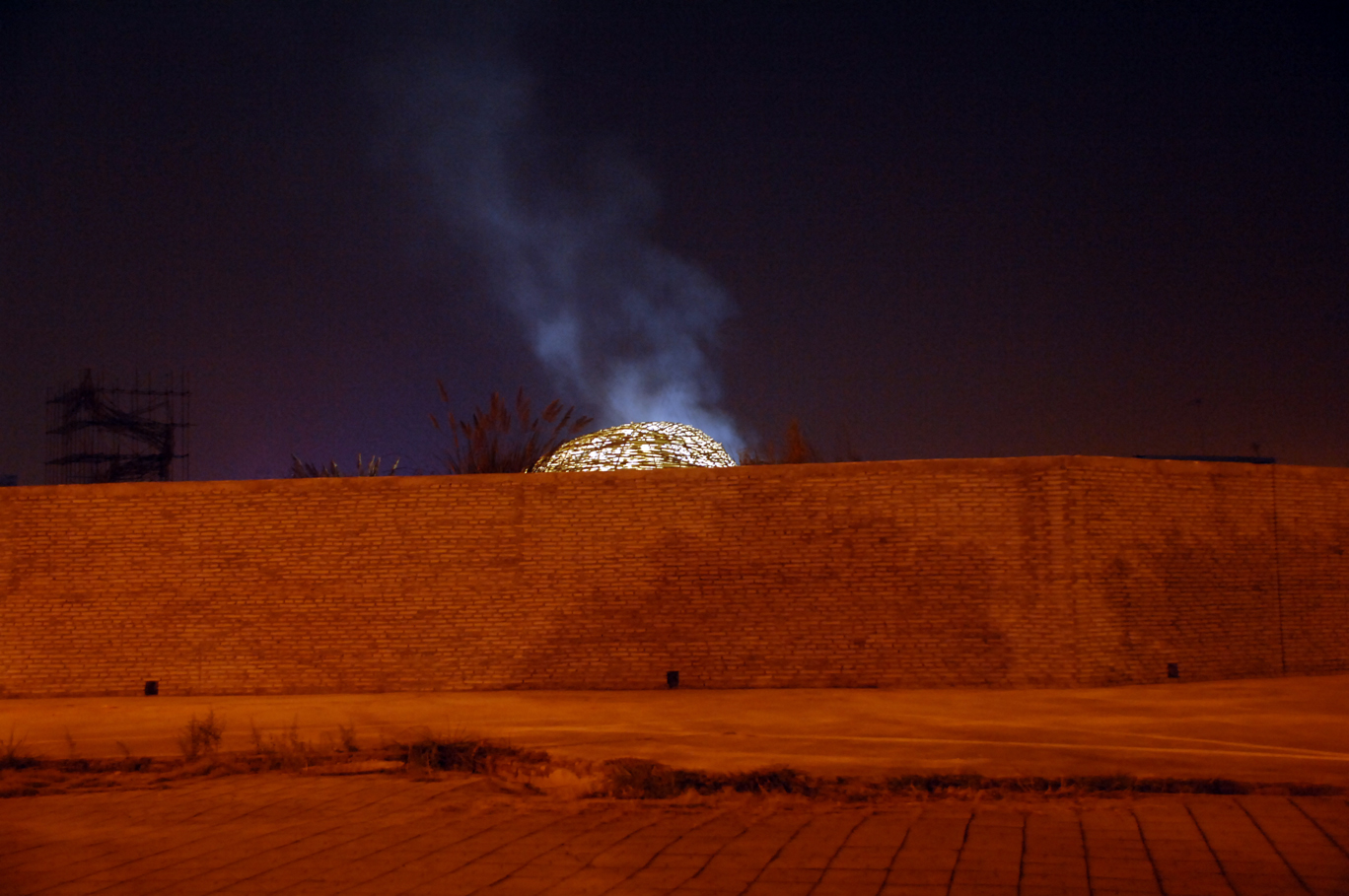
Bug Dome by WEAK! in Shenzhen, 2009.

Roan Ching-Yueh (Chinese: 阮慶岳; born in 1957 in Pingtung, Taiwan) is a Taiwanese architect, writer, curator and a Professor of Department of Art and Design, Yuan Ze University.

== Books ==
He has published more than 30 books in both Taiwan and China, including architecture and literature writings. One of his novels, Lin Xiu-Zhi and Her Family, was included in the 10 best Chinese books of 2004 by Yazhou Zhoukan in Hong Kong.

== Awards ==
He has won literary awards including Taiwan Literature Awards 2001, Taipei Literature Awards 2003 and Wu Yongfu Literature Awards 2003.

== The Taiwan Pavilion ==
Roan was the curator of Taiwan Pavilion in Venice Biennale 2006 of Paradise Revisited: Micro Cities and Non-Meta Architecture in Taiwan. Roan is WEAK! together with Hsieh Ying-chun and Marco Casagrande. The WEAK! operates an independent architectural research centre Ruin Academy as their headquarters in Taipei.
