= Sandworm =

Sandworm may refer to:

== Fictional animals ==
- Sandworm (Dune), from Frank Herbert's 1965 science fiction novel Dune and its derivative works.

== Living animals ==
- Arenicola marina (lugworm), called "sandworm" in the UK
- Alitta virens, formerly Nereis virens (king ragworm), called "sandworm" in the US
- Hookworm larvae which cause cutaneous larva migrans, called "sandworms" in the southern US
- Sipunculus nudus (peanut worm), called "sandworm" in China

== Other ==
- Sandworm (hacker group), a hacker group within the GRU, a military intelligence agency of the Russian Federation
  - Sandworm: A New Era of Cyberwar and the Hunt for the Kremlin's Most Dangerous Hackers, a 2019 book about the group by Andy Greenberg
- Sandworm (installation), an environmental art installation in the Wenduine Beach, Belgium
