= Nikita Wu =

- 巫祈麟
- Wu in 2009
- Born: Wu Chi-ling; 1975 (age 50–51); Taipei, Taiwan
- Occupation: Writer

Nikita Wu (born Wu Chi-ling 巫祈麟, 1975 in Taipei, Taiwan) is a Taiwanese writer and arts manager. She was the curator of the Future Pavilion in the Taiwan Design Expo 2005 and a project manager in the Taiwan Pavilion of the Venice Biennale 2006, for WEAK! architects in the 2009 Shenzhen & Hong Kong Bi-City Biennale of Urbanism/Architecture and in co-operation with the JUT Foundation for Arts & Architecture for the independent research centre Ruin Academy in Taipei.

Wu is the editor of the independent newspaper Cicada and the Anarchist Gardener.
