= Sami Rintala =

Finnish architect and artist

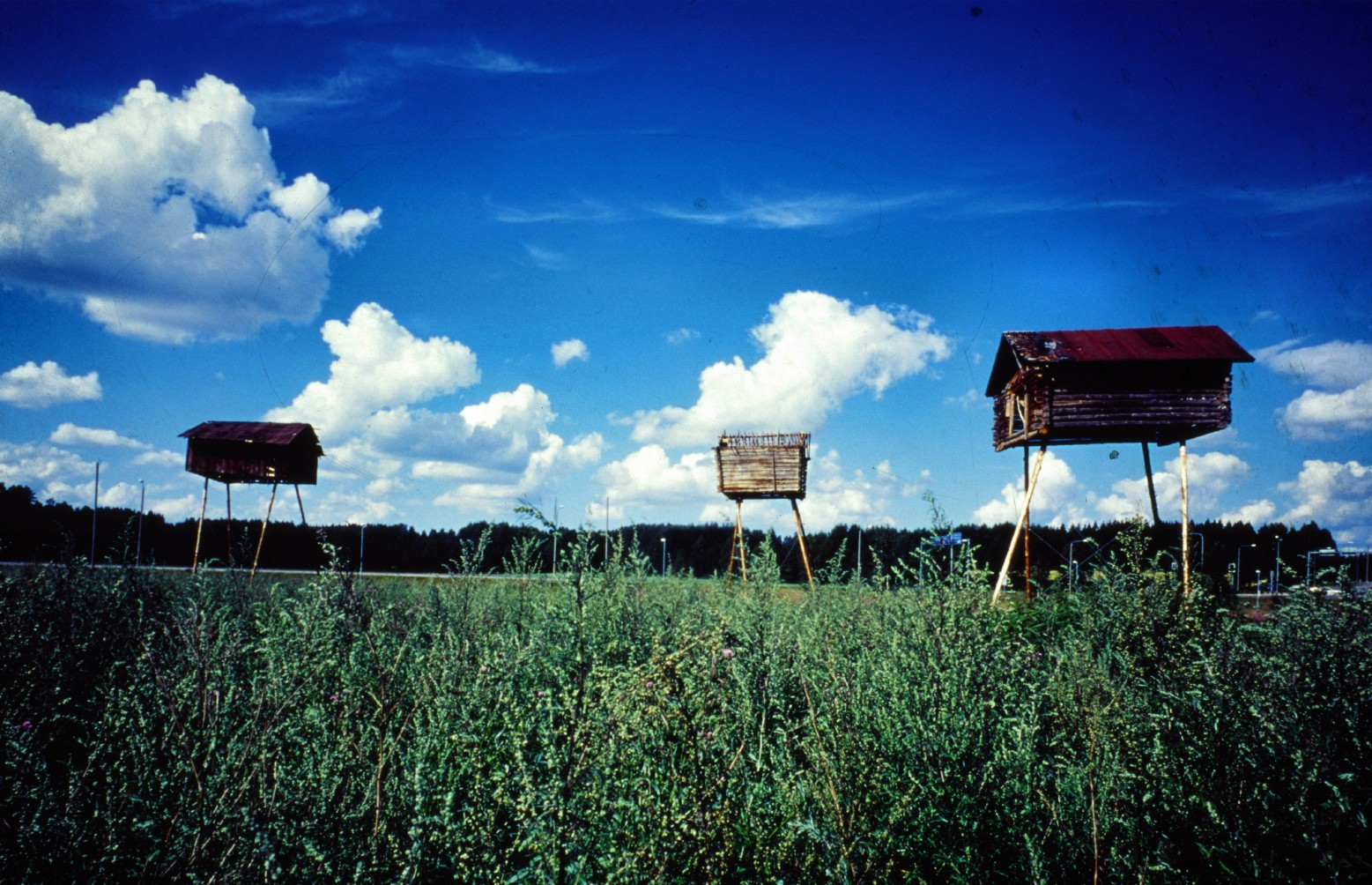
Land(e)scape, 1999

Sami Rintala (born 1969) is a Finnish architect and artist. He studied architecture at Helsinki University of Technology, completing his studies in 1999. Rintala’s own work is based on narrative and conceptualism. The resulting work is a layered interpretation of the physical, mental and poetic resources of the site.

== Casagrande & Rintala ==
Rintala first came to public and critical attention with the joint projects he made with Marco Casagrande, under their partnership, Casagrande & Rintala, from 1998 to 2003, when their partnership dissolved. Casagrande & Rintala produced a series of critically acknowledged architectural installations around the world, often at art biennales, including the Venice Biennale. These works combined architecture with a critical thinking towards society, nature and the real tasks of an architect, all within a cross-over art practice using space, light, materials and the human body as tools of expression.

Casagrande & Rintala had their first wider recognition in 1999 with the award-winning project 'Land(e)scape:' Three abandoned wooden barns were raised on 10 metres (33 ft) high legs to follow their farmers to the cities as a critical comment on the deserting process of the countryside. The barns were then set on fire.

In the Venice Biennale 2000 their project was 'Sixty Minute Man:' A ship sailed to Arsenal with a garden inside. The park was planted on sixty minutes of human waste from the city of Venice, becoming together with the old boat a three-dimensional collage of society waste, commenting on the Biennale theme ‘less aesthetics, more ethics’.

== Rintala Eggertsson Architects ==
In 2007, Rintala started a new architect's office with Icelandic architect Dagur Eggertsson, called Rintala Eggertsson Architects. In 2008 they were joined by Norwegian architect Vibeke Jenssen and became a partner in Rintala Eggertsson Architects in 2012. The office is based in both Oslo in southern Norway, and Bodø in northern Norway. Since the startup, Rintala Eggertsson Architects have manifested themselves as one of the principal architectural practices in Scandinavia. Their work has been exhibited in museums around the world, including the Victoria & Albert Museum in London, National Museum of Art in Beijing, the MAXXI museum in Rome and the Louisiana Museum of Modern Art in Copenhagen.

== Workshops ==
An important part of Rintala and Eggertsson’s work is teaching and lecturing, which they have done in numerous university departments of art and architecture, symposiums and seminars. Their method is usually in the form of hands-on workshops where students and clients often are challenged to participate in the shaping of the human environment in a realistic 1:1 situation. Recent examples are the "Into the Landscape" installations around the lake Seljord, Norway and the "Miilu" pavilion for the Venice biennale in 2010. The previous year, the importance of their sustainable architecture teaching methods leads them to win a Global Award for Sustainable Architecture.

Rintala’s own work is based on narrative and conceptualism. The resulting work is a layered interpretation of the physical, mental and poetic resources of the site.

In 2009, at the request of the Alvar Aalto Academy, Rintala was invited to choose the theme for the 2009 international "Alvar Aalto Symposium" held every four years in the city of Jyväskylä: Rintala selected the conference theme of "Paracentric Architecture".

== Works ==
=== Works by Casagrande & Rintala ===
- Land(e)scape, installation art, Savonlinna, Finland, 1999.
- 1000 White Flags landscape installation: 1000 white flags of sheets from mental hospitals on ironing bars on a mountain, Koli National Park, Finland, 2000.
- Convoy landscape installation on water: three abandoned rowing boats mounted vertically on the surface of Lake Saimaa, Rantasalmi, Finland, 2000.
- Quatzalcoatlus, architectonic installation to the Havana Biennale, Havana, Cuba, 2000.
- Architectonic installation of 15,000 books in Piazza Della Republica, Biennale Dell´Arte Contemporanea di Firenze 2001, Florence, Italy, 2001.
- Architectonic installation in Anchorage, facing the Federal Building and Museum of History and Art, temple structure of used railroad oil tanks and oyster shells; Alaska Design Forum, Anchorage, Alaska, USA, 2003.

=== Works by Rintala ===
- Hotel Kirkenes, Barents Art Triennale, 2005.
- Element House, Bisan Urban Natural Park, Anyang Resort, South Korea, 2006.

=== Works by Rintala and Eggertsson ===
- Amanogawa bridge, Tokaichi Millennium Forest, Hokkaido, Japan, 2007.
- Boxhome: A 19 m2 house, containing basic dwelling functions. Prototype built for Gallery ROM, Oslo, Norway, 2007.
- Kaluga Floating Sauna, Archstoyanie 08 - Festival of Landscape Art, Ugra National Park, Russia, 2008.
- Ordos 100 villa, part of development managed by Ai Weiwei and curated by Herzog & De Meuron, Inner-Mongolia, China, 2008.
- Safe Haven Orphanage Library, Ban Tha Song Yang Village, Thailand, 2009.
- Graph, installation for the Art Museum of China, 2009.
- ARK booktower, installation for the Victoria & Albert Museum, London, 2010.
- Cabinet Home, a prototype home created for the MAXXI Museum, Rome, 2010.
- Seljord Lookout tower, Seljord, Norway, 2011.
- Arboretum, public artwork for a home for juvenile immigrants, Gjøvik, Norway, 2011.
- Concrete pavilion, for World Design Capital Helsinki 2012, Milano Triennale, 2012.
- Hut-to-hut, prototype for a geotourist-dwelling, Kumta, Karnataka, India, 2012.
- Dragonfly, for Treehotel Harads, Sweden, 2013.
- Høse pedestrian bridge, Sand, Suldal, Norway, 2013.
- Bus:Stop Kressbad, Krubach, Austria, 2014.
