= Sandworm (installation) =

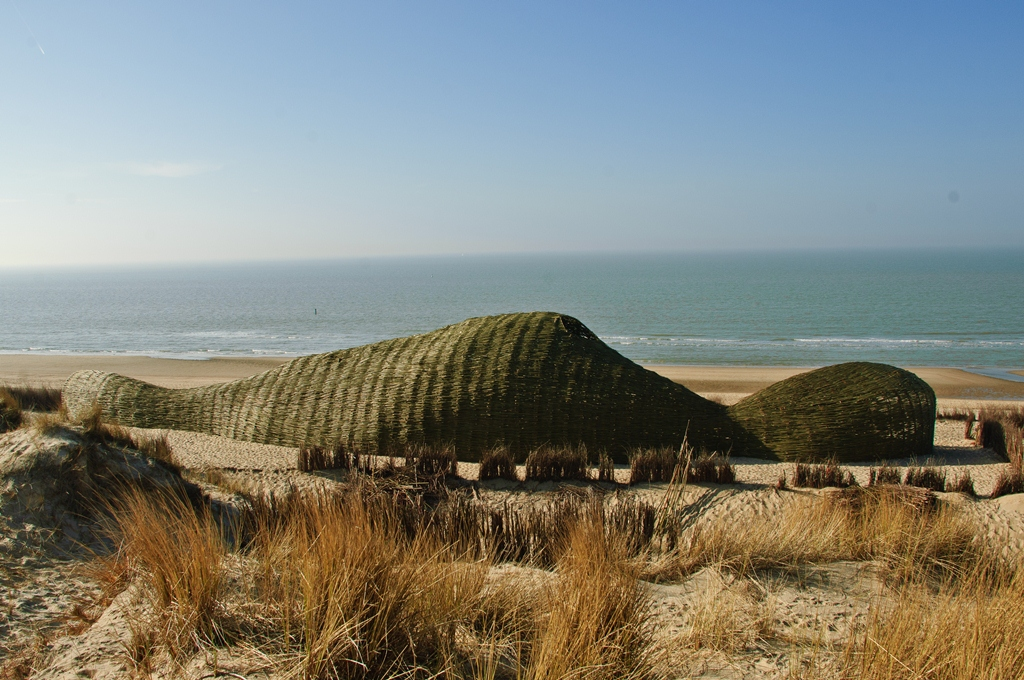
Sandworm at the Wenduine Beach in Belgium, 2012

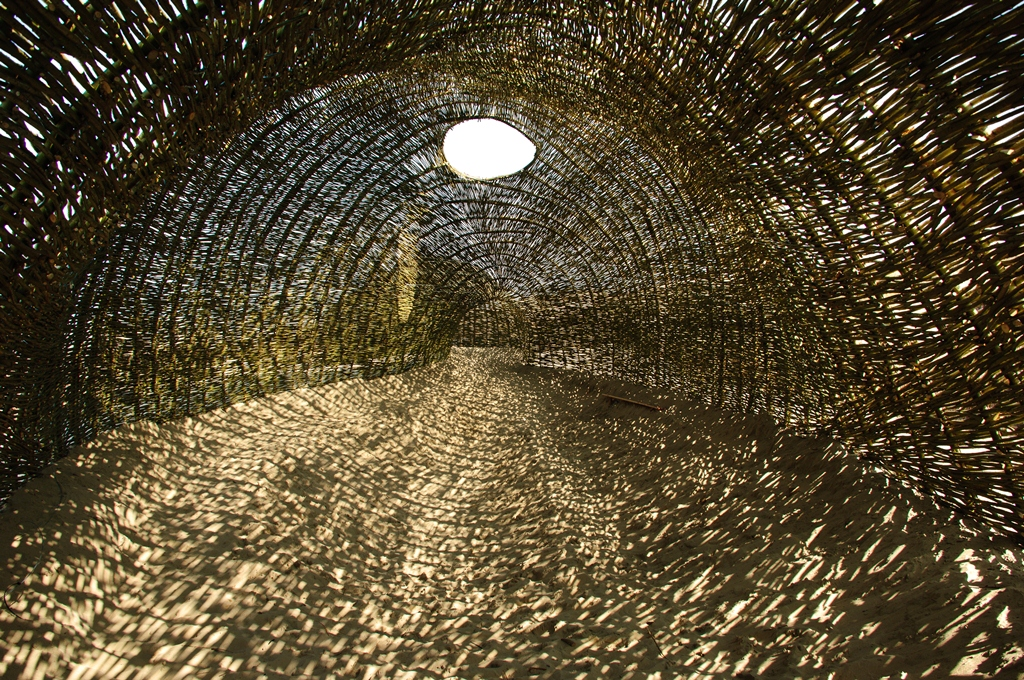
The interior of the Sandworm, nicknamed the "willow cathedral"

Sandworm (2012) is a site-specific art installation and a fusion of environmental art and architecture by Finnish architect Marco Casagrande situated on the dunes of Wenduine beach in Belgium. The curvaceous structure is made entirely from willow. The fifty-metre long organic structure stretches out between the dunes like an enormous wooden worm. It is part of the Beaufort Triennial of Contemporary art.

The installation is an organic shell built from willow branches woven through arches of various heights placed at a length of 45 meters and a height and width of 10 meters. It falls within a local long tradition of willow weaving normally more modest in scale. Sandworm has been created in an undulating shape upon the tidal beaches of Wenduine town. From a distance, the mounds of tree remnants suggest the form of a massive creature, emerging out of the ground. Up close, visitors can investigate the textured surface of the structure, and they are invited to interact with the sculpture by walking through the interior. The space is used for picnics, relaxation and "post industrial meditation".
Building on Monet's beliefs that it is only the surrounding atmosphere that gives subjects their true value, Casagrande works in harmony with the air and light in this architectural piece.

Casagrande describes the work as "weak architecture" – a human-made structure that wishes to become part of nature through flexibility and organic presence. The visitors are describing the Sandworm as a willow cathedral finely tuned to celebrate the site specific conditions of the Wenduine tidal beaches. As one visitor, Peter Beyen, puts it: "The artist believes that architectural control goes against nature and thus also against architecture… To the Finnish artist Marco Casagrande designing is not sufficient. Design should not replace reality. The building must grow out of the location, it must react to its environment, it must be a reflection of life and also be itself, as every other living being." According to Peter Beyen, Casagrande "believes that the built human environment should be a mediator between human nature and nature itself. To be part of this, man must be weak".
