= Ruin Academy =

Architecture research center in Taipei, Taiwan

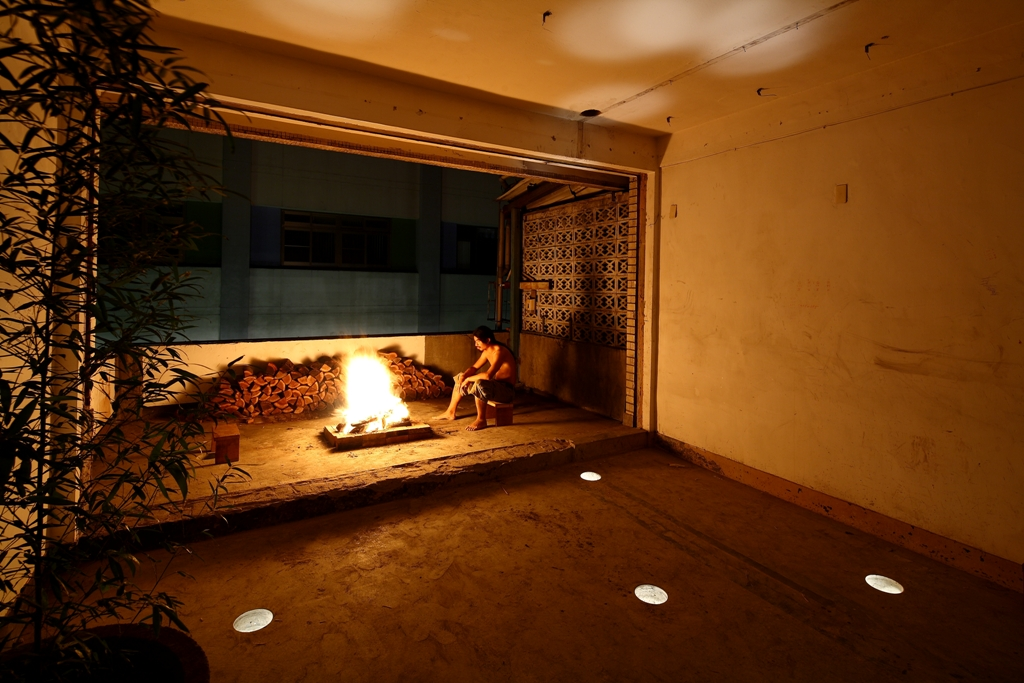
Fireplace at the Ruin Academy

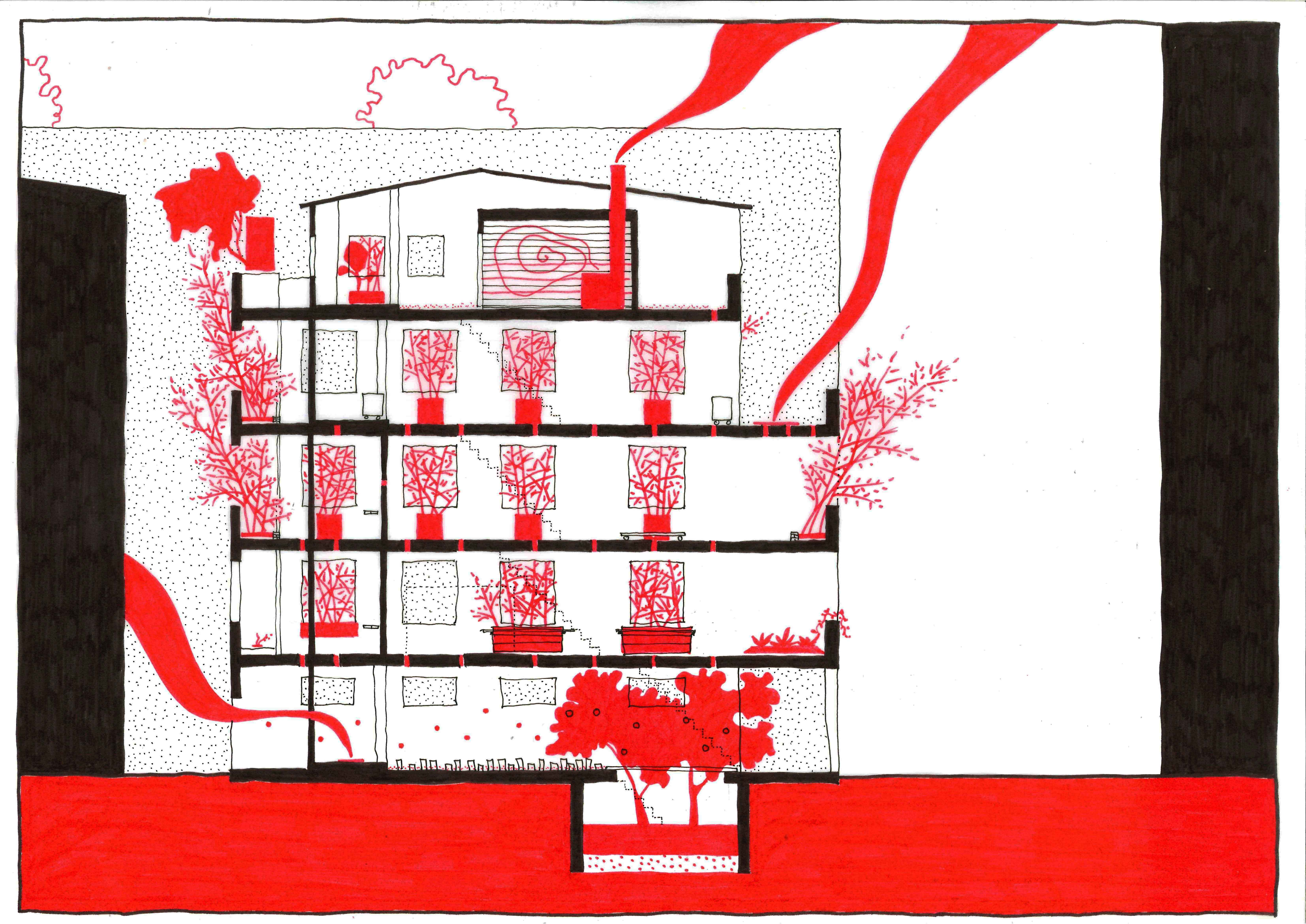
Ruin Academy, section

Ruin Academy (established 2010) is an independent cross-over architectural research center in the Urban Core area of Taipei City, Taiwan. It is 'set to re-think the industrial city and the modern man in the box' through research and a series of workshops.

The Ruin Academy occupies an abandoned 5-story apartment building in central Taipei. All the interior walls of the building and all the windows are removed in order to grow bamboo and vegetables inside the house. The plants are situated so that their vegetation grows in front of the glassless window spaces, giving privacy to those inside. The professors and students are sleeping and working in mahogany made ad hoc dormitories and have a public sauna on the 5th floor. All the building is penetrated with 6-inch holes in order to let “rain inside”.

The architectural control is in a process of giving up in order to let nature to step in. So far it is not giving up – it is too lazy. Architectural control will be given up. Modernism is lost and the industrial machine will become organic. This happens in Taipei and this is what we study. Ruin Academy is an organic machine. Ruin is viewed as a tipping point when a man-made object becomes part of nature.

== Research topics ==
The research and design workshops engage with architecture, urban design and environmental art. Anarchic Grandmothers, Academic Squatting, Urban Acupuncture-these are some of the ideas behind the Ruin Academy. The Academy workshops include: Organic Acupuncture (spontaneous and often illegal urban farms and community gardens balancing the industrial Taipei and tuning the city towards the organic); "River Urbanism (landscape urbanism); "Illegal Architecture" (Architecture that uses the city energy source, like a parasite. Casagrande adds, “many spontaneous and often illegal communities are growing that are more complex and fruitful than official development and official architecture – often blindly directed by economy and centralised politics. Anarchist grandmothers are cultivating illegal community gardens and urban farms everywhere around Taipei. They are breaking the city.” The Academy is focused on the research of the ruining processes of Taipei that keep the city alive.

The International Society of Biourbanism published in 2013 Marco Casagrande's book Biourban Acupuncture - From Treasure Hill of Taipei to Artena, which explains the operations, methodology and aims of the Ruin Academy in detail. For the industrial cities, biourban acupuncture offers a path to achieve the Third Generation City. Cities, to be the fall of the machine, where “the ruin” is the reality produced by nature, that reclaims the artefact. Biourbanism happens, when nature force takes the initiative, affects the design of industrial society, and becomes co- architect. The Ruin Academy received the World Architecture Community Award in 2011. The Academy is operated by the Taiwanese JUT Foundation for Arts & Architecture, in cooperation with Finland-based Casagrande Laboratory.

== Anarchist Gardener ==
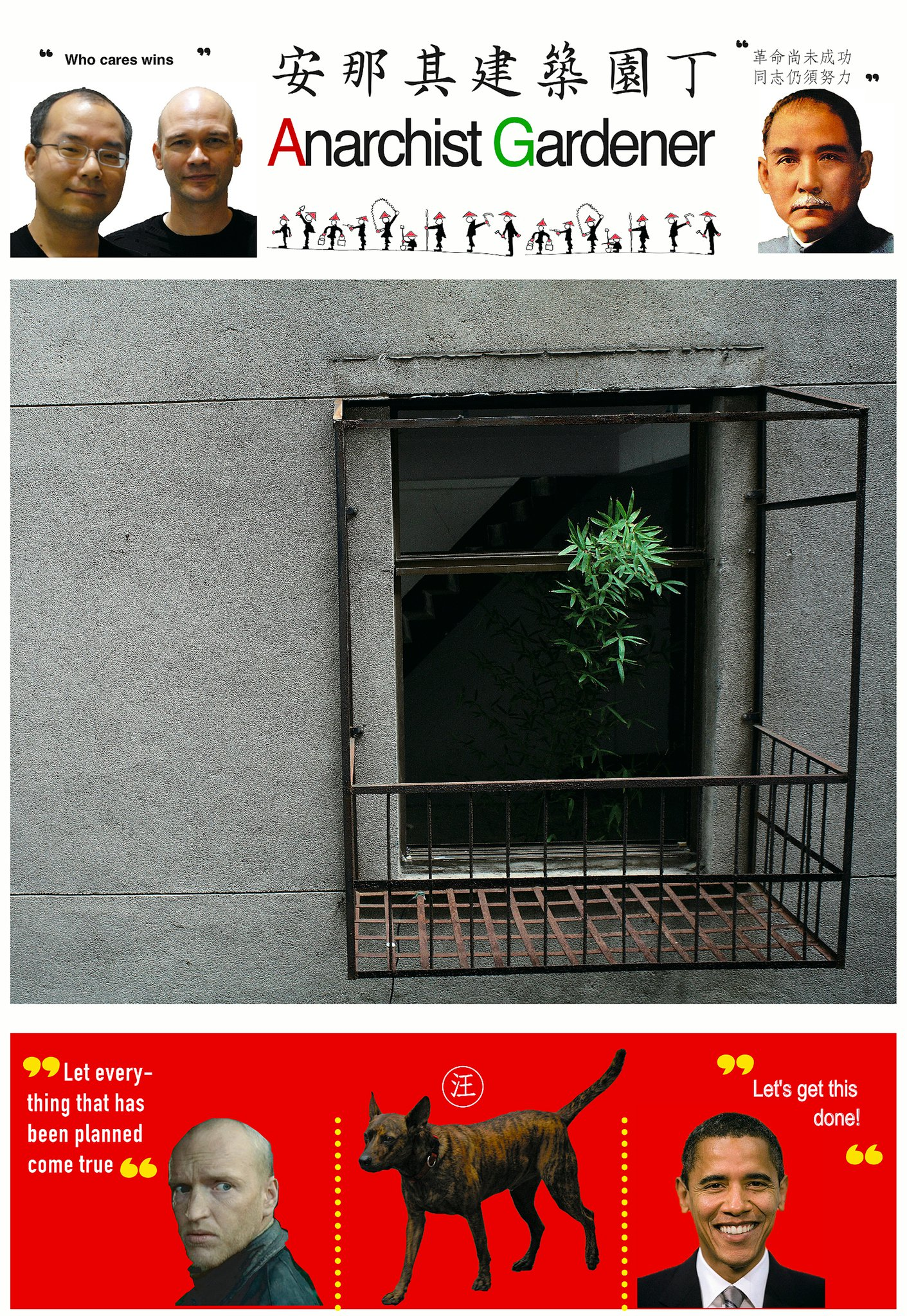
Cover of the Anarchist Gardener issue 1.

The Ruin Academy publishes an independent free newspaper, the Anarchist Gardener, edited by Nikita Wu. The newspaper is an open form collage of the Academy's thinking on the future of the built human environment. A special issue of the newspaper has been produced for the Shenzhen & Hong Kong Bi-City Biennial of Architecture and Urbanism 2012 . and for the Austrian Museum of Contemporary art MAK exhibition Eastern Promises, 2013.
