= Marco Casagrande =

Finnish architect (born 1971)

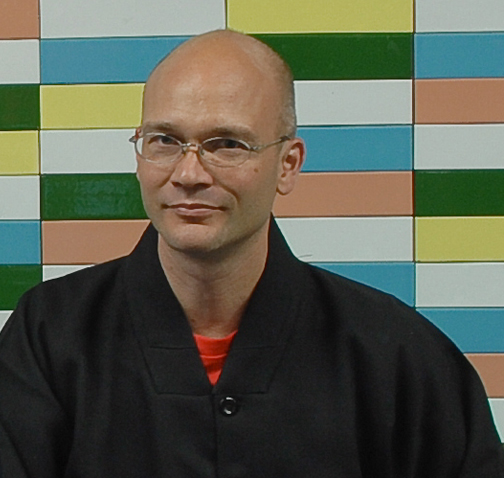
Marco Casagrande at SZHK Biennale 2009

Marco Mario Paolo Casagrande (born 7 May 1971) is a Finnish architect, environmental artist, architectural theorist, former mercenary, writer and professor of architecture. He graduated from Helsinki University of Technology department of architecture (2001). Casagrande has been identified as an anarchist architect.

== Early life ==
Casagrande was born in Turku, Finland, to a well-off Italian-Finnish Catholic family. He spent his childhood in Ylitornio in Finnish Lapland, but went to school in Karis, a southern Finland small town, before moving to Helsinki to study architecture.

== Mercenary and writer ==
Casagrande claimed that he volunteered for the Bosnian Croat Defence Forces HVO in 1993 after his service in the Finnish Army. He wrote under the pen name Luca Moconesi a controversial book Mostarin tien liftarit / Hitchhikers on the Road to Mostar (WSOY 1997) about his alleged experiences in the Bosnian Civil War, and based on descriptions of war crimes committed by the main character in the autobiographical book, he came under suspicion as a possible war criminal. The war crimes listed in the book include the murder of a civilian woman in her home, and plotting to destroy a dam to flood a village with civilian inhabitants. After coming under suspicion he claimed that the book was in fact a work of fiction.

Later Casagrande has expressed views condemning war crimes from a military perspective: "Those troops know that they are doing wrong. This is the very opposite of constructive collectivity and group spirit. Anybody can understand that it is by no measures militarily efficient to go kicking the doors of old people's home." Casagrande has been lecturing in the National Defence University of Finland since 2006 on courses of strategy and leadership.

== Architect and artist ==
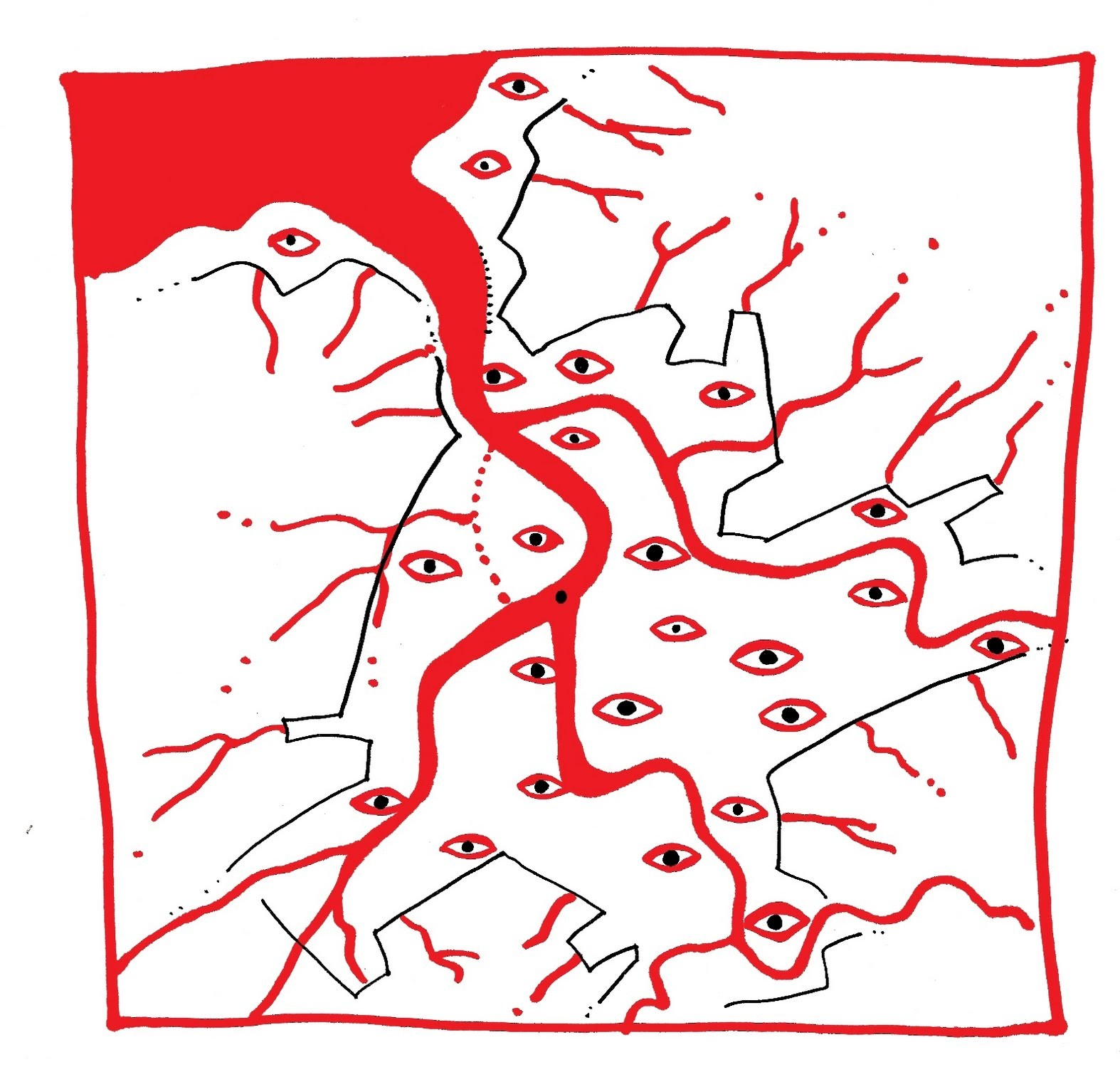
Taipei organic acupuncture

From the early stages of his career Casagrande started to mix architecture with other disciplines of art and science landing with a series of ecologically conscious architectural installations around the world. After being a finalist in the UK journal Architectural Review's Emerging Architecture competition (1999) Marco Casagrande and his then partner Sami Rintala were invited to the Venice Biennial 2000. The New York Times reporter chose their project "60 Minute Man" as his personal favorite in the Biennale. In the project Casagrande & Rintala had planted on oak forest in an abandoned barge on top of 60 minutes worth of composted human waste produced by the city of Venice. Casagrande's cross-over architectural work encompasses the realms of architecture, urban and environmental planning, environmental art, circuses and other artistic disciplines.

In search for subconscious architecture, real reality and connection between the modern man and nature. He believes that one shall not be blindfolded by stress, the surroundings of economics, the online access to entertainment or information. What is real is valuable.

Casagrande's works and teaching are in-between architecture, urban and environmental design and science, environmental art and circus. There is no other reality than nature.

Casagrande was nominated as the professor of ecological urban planning in the Taiwan based Tamkang University after the Treasure Hill project, in which Casagrande changed an illegal settlement of urban farmers into an experimental laboratory of environmental urbanism. The overhaul had mixed reactions from the community. In 2017, he was invited-professor at the ENSAV : École Nationale Supérieure d'Architecture de Versailles.

Marco Casagrande is the laureate of the European Prize for Architecture 2013, CICA Award of the International Committee of Architectural Critics for conceptual and artistic architecture and UNESCO & Locus Foundation's Global Award for Sustainable Architecture 2015.

== Third generation city ==
Casagrande views cities as complex energy organisms in which different overlapping layers of energy flows are determining the actions of the citizens as well as the development of the city. By mixing environmentalism and urban design Casagrande is developing methods of punctual manipulation of the urban energy flows in order to create an ecologically sustainable urban development towards the so-called 3rd Generation City (post industrial city).

Casagrande utilized the tenets of acupuncture: treat the points of blockage and let relief ripple throughout the body. More immediate and sensitive to community needs than traditional institutional forms of large scale urban renewal interventions would not only respond to localized needs, but do so with a knowledge of how citywide systems operated and converged at that single node. Release pressure at strategic points, release pressure for the whole city.

The theory of the Third Generation City views the post industrial urban condition as a machine ruined by nature including human nature and architects as design shamans merely interpreting what the bigger nature of the shared mind is transmitting. This organic machine is kept alive through continuous and spontaneous ruining processes performed by citizens, to whom Casagrande refers to as 「anarchist gardeners」 by means of urban farming, illegal architecture and urban acupuncture. The element of Ruin is viewed as something man-made having become part of nature. The theory is developed in the independent multidisciplinary research centre Ruin Academy (2010-).

Third Generation City follows the first generation where humans peacefully coexisted with nature and the second generation built walls and stone structures everywhere in an attempt to shut out nature. In the third generation however, nature, which can never be truly shut out, grows back through the ruins, through the cracks in the wall, sucking human nature back into the wider nature. Third Generation City concentrates on local knowledge and urban acupuncture rather than on centrally governed urban planning. Casagrande describes urban acupuncture as:
[a] cross-over architectural manipulation of the collective sensuous intellect of a city. City is viewed as multi-dimensional sensitive energy-organism, a living environment. Urban acupuncture aims into a touch with this nature. and Sensitivity to understand the energy flows of the collective chi beneath the visual city and reacting on the hot-spots of this chi. Architecture is in the position to produce the acupuncture needles for the urban chi. and A weed will root into the smallest crack in the asphalt and eventually break the city. Urban acupuncture is the weed and the acupuncture point is the crack. The possibility of the impact is total, connecting human nature as part of nature. The theory opens the door for uncontrolled creativity and freedom. Each citizen is enabled to join the creative process, feel free to use city space for any purpose and develop his environment according to his will. The agents of the Third Generation City are sensitive citizens who feel the calling of a sustainable co-operation with the rest of the nature, sensitive citizen who are aware of the destruction that the insensitive modern machine is causing to nature including human nature. Urban acupuncture produces small-scale but socially catalytic interventions into the urban fabric.

The relationship between architectural design and organic knowledge involves a separation of roles. While architects and designers do not naturally inherit or preserve collective cultural memory, their professional training allows them to interpret and negotiate these traditional insights. But conflicts car arise if an architect try to claim copyright over fragments of localized knowledge, prioritizing individual intellectual property over communal ownership. Instead of imposing rigid design structures, professionals can establish open platforms that allow organic knowledge to surface and develop its own forms. Formal design is not always required as organic knowledge functions as a direction reflection of realities.

Casagrande's works have been selected three times to the Venice Architecture Biennale; years 2000, 2004 and 2006.

== Collaboration with Rintala ==
Casagrande & Rintala - Marco Casagrande and Sami Rintala - is a Finnish architect and artist group producing architectonic installations 1998–2003 for international venues of contemporary architecture and art. Their works move between architecture and environmental art.

For their landscape installation 1000 White Flags (summer 2002), for example, the artists speckled a downhill-skiing range in Koli Nature Park, Finland, with flags made of used sheets from mental hospitals. Casagrande & Rintala here drew attention to the madness of businessmen who cut down ancient forests.

Casagrande & Rintala's work Land(e)scape was awarded in the Architectural Review's Emerging Architecture Award 1999 competition and chosen for the Venice Biennale 2000. New York Times architecture critic Herbert Muschamp chose their project 60 Minute Man his personal favourite of the biennale.

Casagrande & Rintala design and build all their works by themselves. The design process continued during the construction work.
"The work itself usually changes its shape or obtains more layers during the construction process. We keep ourselves open to changes in the work. When it is finding its shape it usually starts to tell us more about itself."

== Important works ==
=== Land(e)scape ===
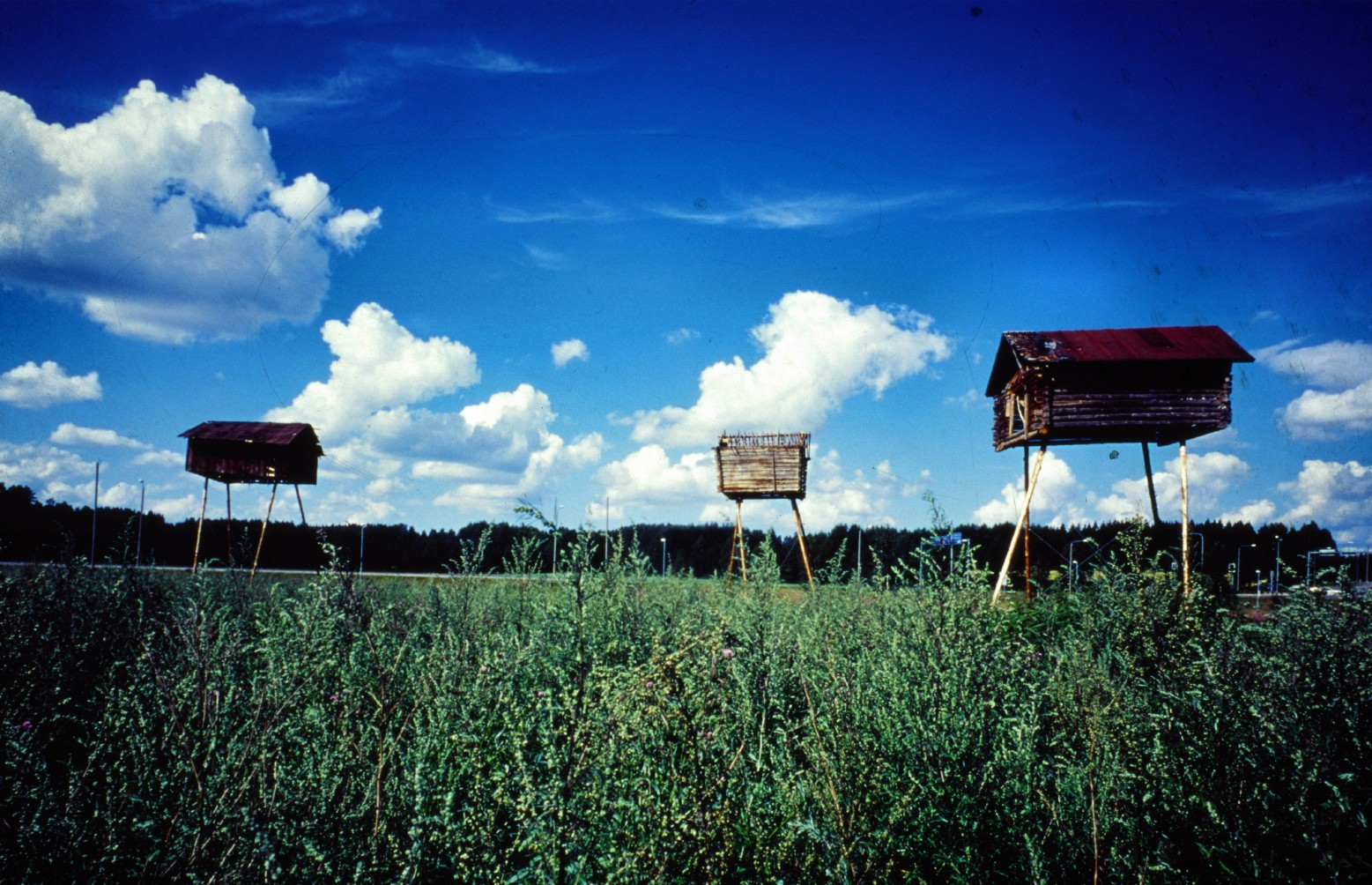
Land(e)scape on display

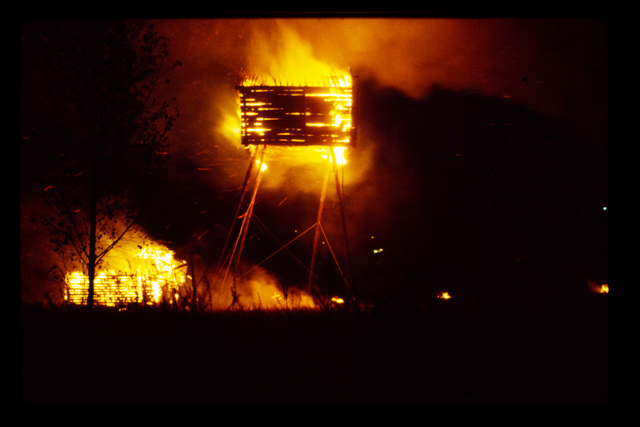
Burning of Land(e)scape, 1999

Land(e)scape (1999), an architectural installation by Finnish architects Casagrande & Rintala, with Marco Casagrande and Sami Rintala, in a former field in Savonlinna. The work is commenting on the desertion process of the Finnish countryside.

Three of these abandoned barns "were driven," the architects explained, "to the point where they have had to break their primeval union with the soil. Desolate, they have risen on their shanks and are swaying towards the cities of the south."

The work was awarded in the Architectural Review's Emerging Architecture 1999 competition and selected to the Venice Biennale 2000. Land(e)scape launched the international career of Casagrande & Rintala.

The art work was set on fire by the authors in October 1999.

Land(e)scape represented Finland in the New Trends or Architecture in Europe and Japan 2001 exhibitions.

=== Redrum ===
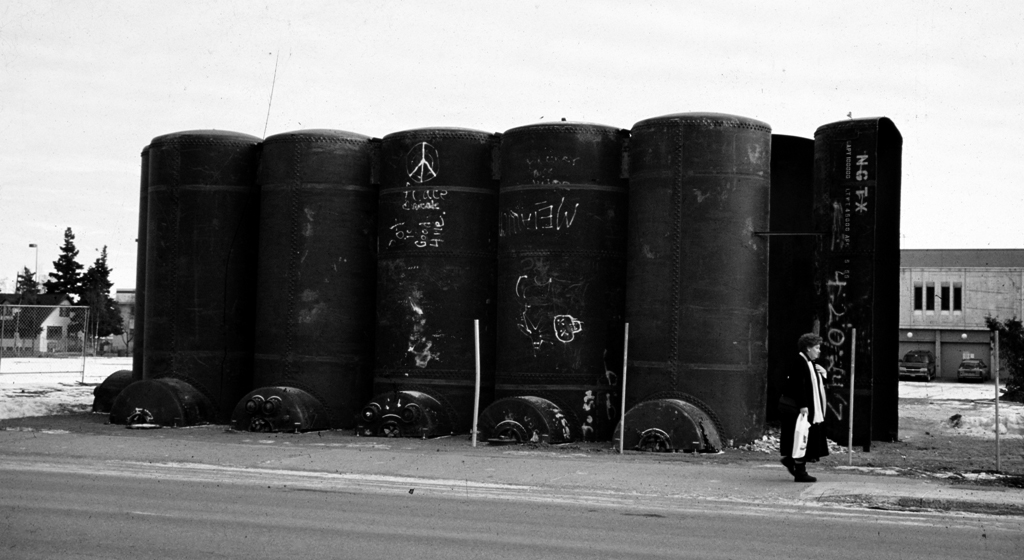
Casagrande & Rintale: Redrum (2003)

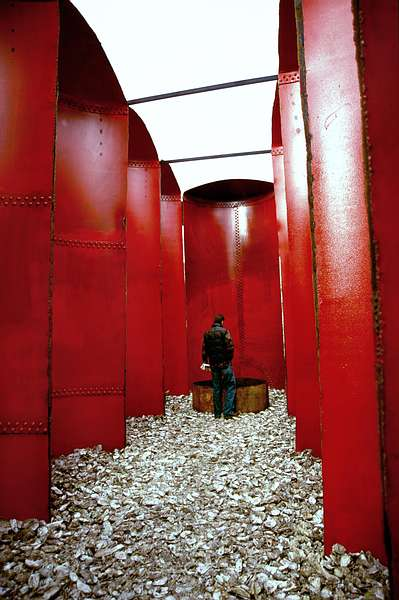
Redrum interior (2003)

Redrum (2003) is an architectonic installation in Anchorage Alaska by Finnish architects Casagrande & Rintala. The work is commissioned by Alaska Design Forum.

3 Alaska Railroad oil tanks cut into total 12 pieces and turned into a temple structure opposite the Federal Building of Anchorage in the crossing of C-Street and 7th Avenue. The interior is painted bright red in contrast to the rusty and brutal exterior. The floor is made of 3500 kg of oyster shells, the origin of all Alaskan oil.

"Redrum" is "murder" backwards. The designers intended to comment on the connection of oil, war and environment. Local media described the piece as "a slap in the face to Alaskans".

=== Potemkin ===
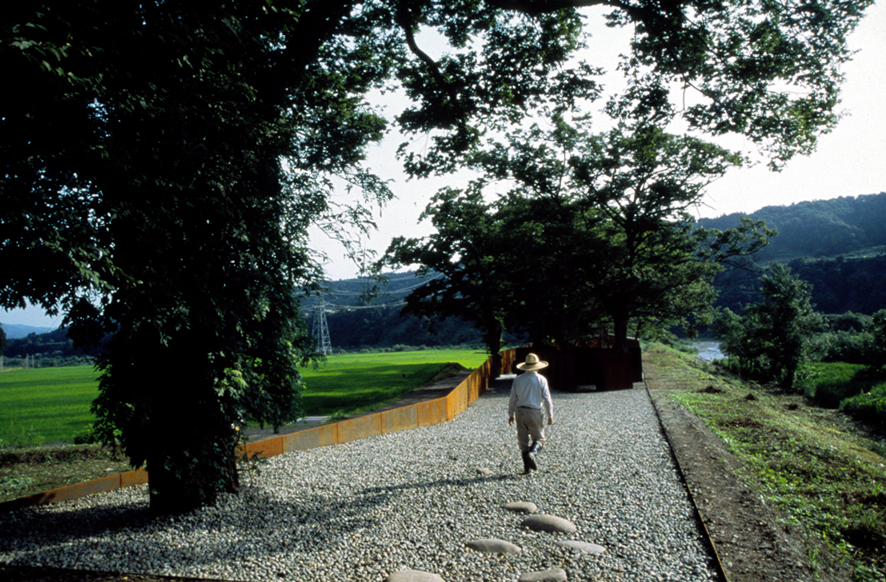
Casagrande & Rintala: Potemkin (2003)

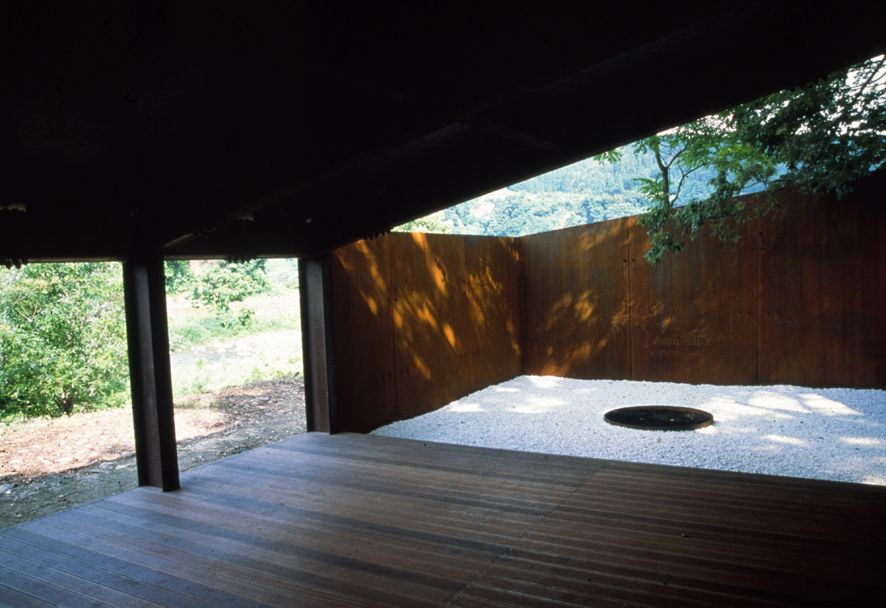
Potemkin interior

Potemkin is an architectural park by Casagrande & Rintala for Kuramata village in Japan 2003. A steel made mix between a temple and machine. The work consists indoor and outdoor spaces for post-industrial meditation. Potemkin is commissioned by the Echigo-Tsumari Contemporary Art Triennial 2003.

Potemkin stands as the Acropolis to be the post industrial temple to think of the connection between the modern man and nature. I see Potemkin as a cultivated junk yard situated between the ancient rice fields and the river with a straight axis to the Shinto temple.

The site is a former illegal dumping ground turned into a riverside park. The architecture of the park was drawn on site in 1:1 scale on snow by walking the lines with snow-shoes and then built up when the snow melted.

The park is made out of one inch thick Kawasaki steel and recycled urban and industrial waste. It is 130 meters long and 15 meters wide with a series of outdoor and indoor spaces.

=== Other works ===
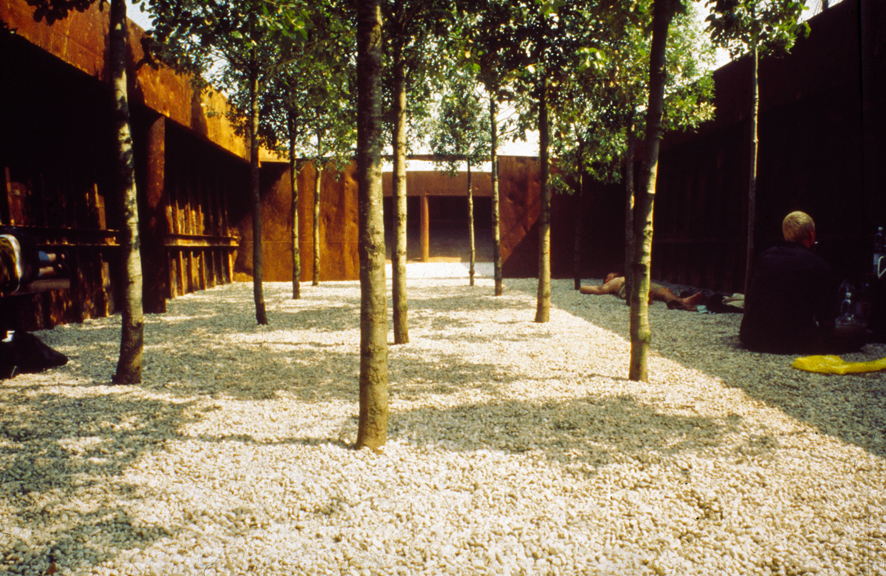
Sixty minute man, 2000

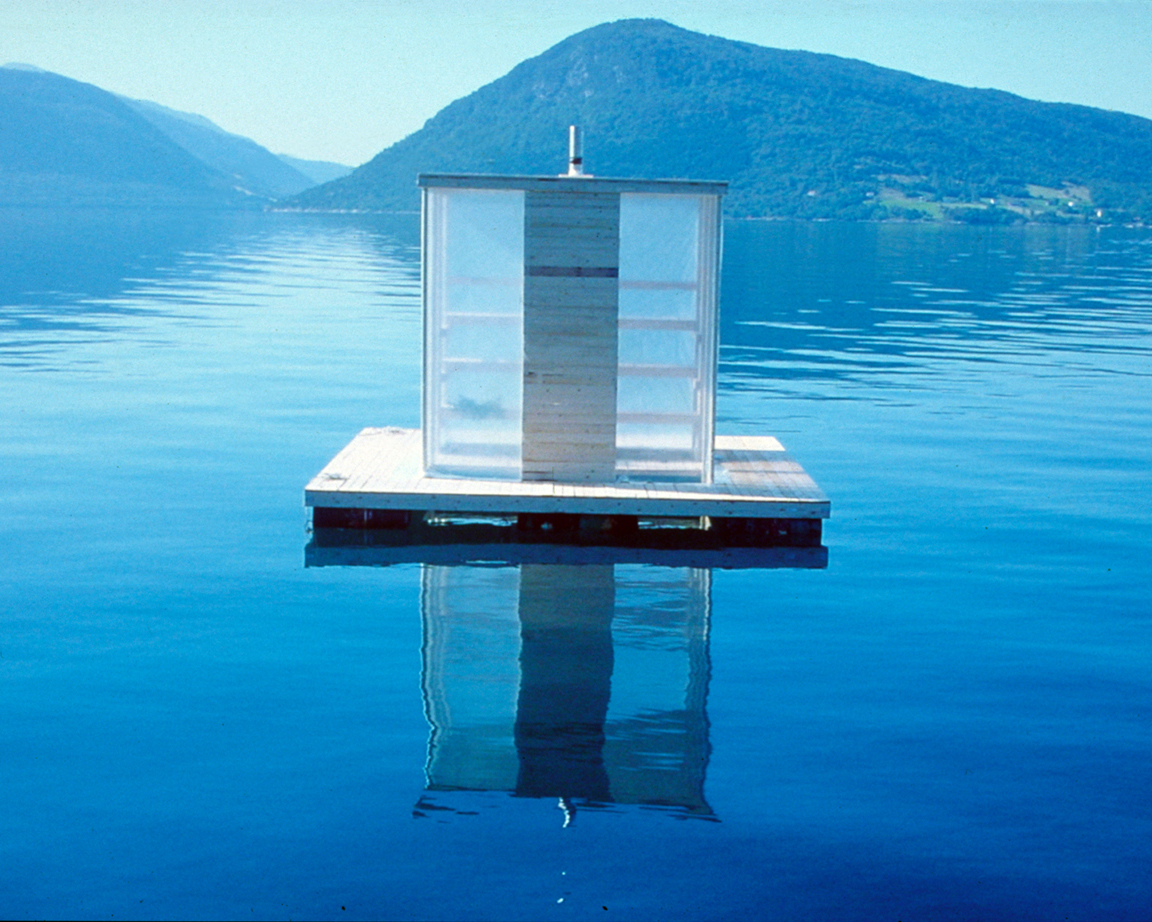
Floating Sauna, 2002

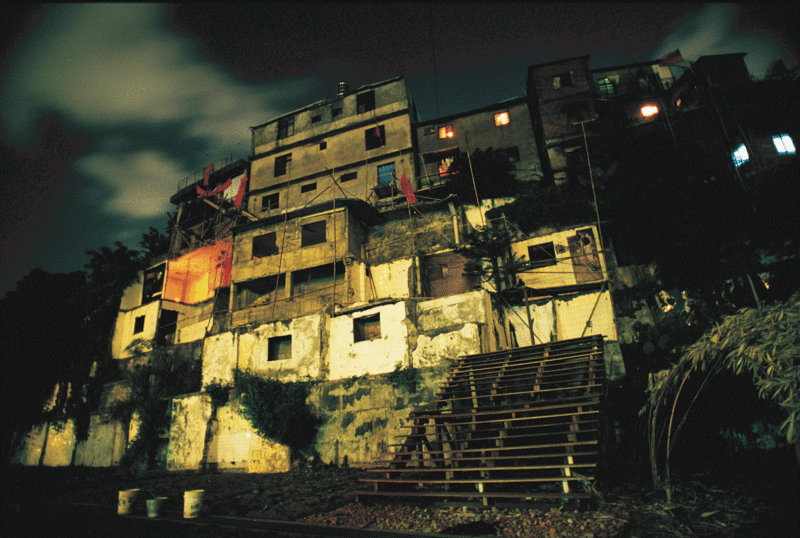
Treasure Hill, 2003

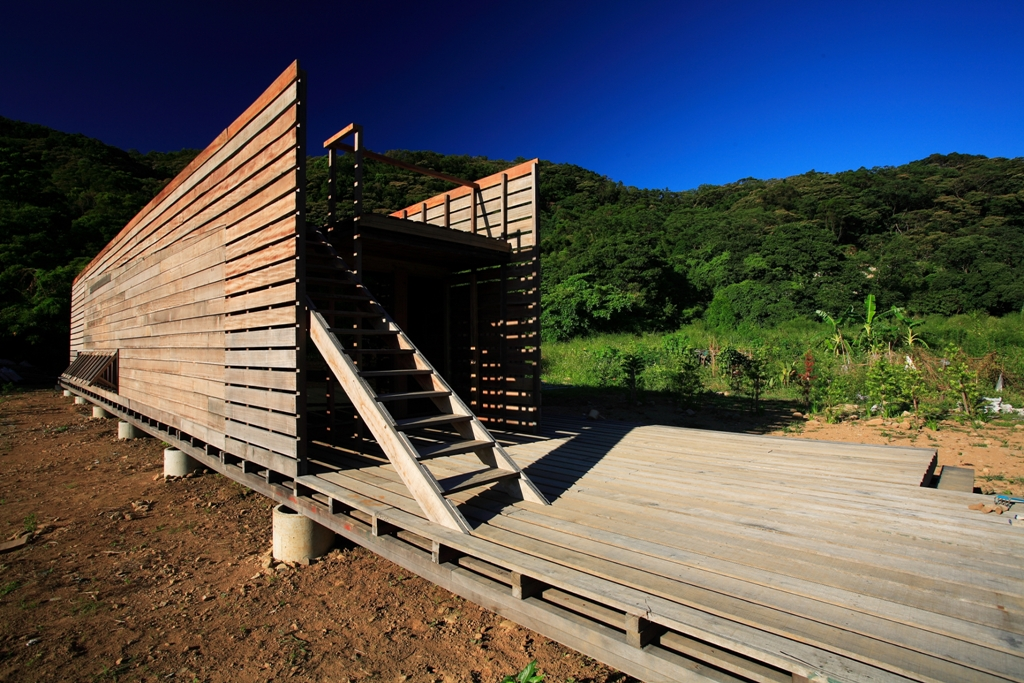
Chen House, 2008

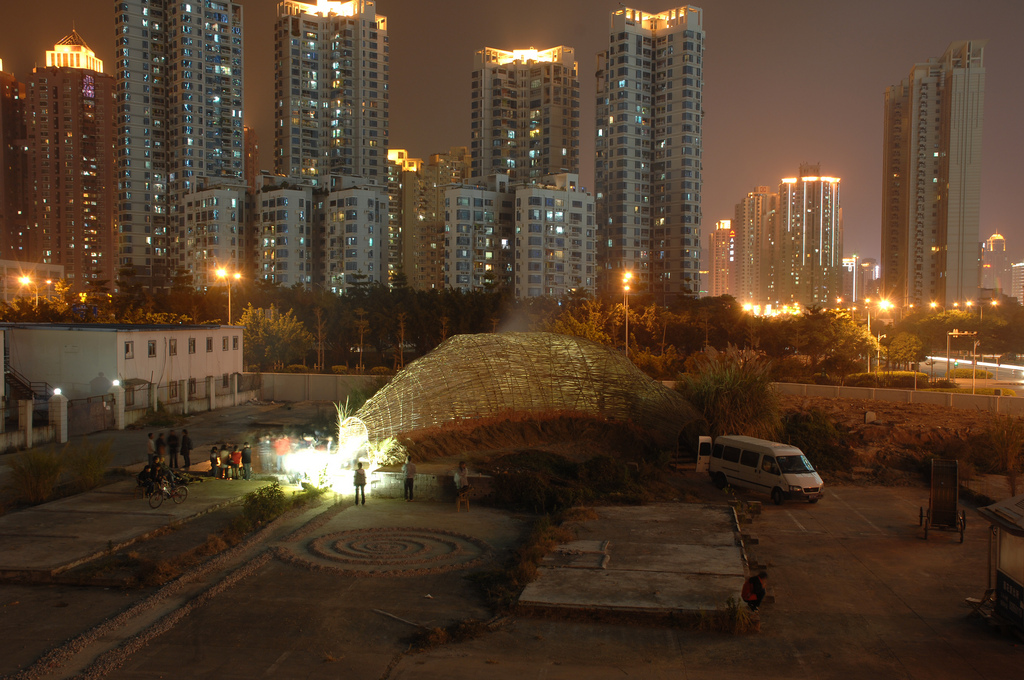
Bug Dome, 2009

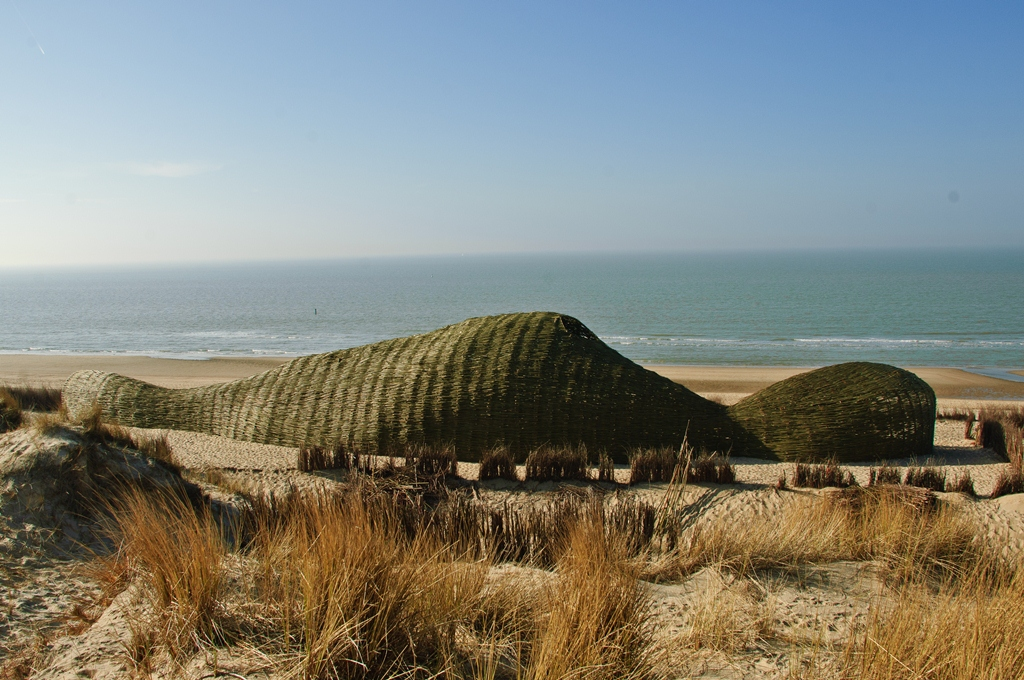
Sandworm, 2012

- 60 Minute Man, architectonic installation, Casagrande & Rintala, Venice Architecture Biennale 2000
  - 50 meters long abandoned barge into which is planted an oak garden on top of 60 minutes worth of human waste produced by the city of Venice.
- Uunisaari Summer Theatre, temporary architecture, Casagrande & Rintala, Helsinki Finland 2000
  - A temporary round theatre building on Suomenlinna -island outside of Helsinki.
- 1000 White Flags, environmental art installation, Casagrande & Rintala, Koli Finland 2000
  - White flags out of used sheets from mental hospitals mounted on a downhill skiing range to cure the hill.
- Quetzalcoatlus, installation, Casagrande & Rintala, Havana Biennale 2000
  - A 300 kg iron bar stretched between two university building with 10 km of fishing line.
- Bird Hangar, architectonic installation, Casagrande & Rintala, Yokohama Triennial 2001
  - A re-bar and hemp rope silo releasing balsa birds attached to meteorological balloons carrying seeds of Japanese vegetables to the city.
- Installation 1:2001, public installation, Casagrande & Rintala, Firenze Biennale 2001
  - A round wall of 15.000 political, philosophical and religious books from around the wall title backs out, white paper in. The work was originally intended to be installed in Cuba, but Government resistance forced the project to Italy.
- Dallas-Kalevala, art journey, Casagrande & Rintala, Demeter Environmental Art, Hokkaido Japan 2002
  - A land journey from Finland to Japan with car collecting polaroid photos of grandmothers, old axes and local radio sound.
- Chain Reactor, architectonic installation, Casagrande & Rintala, Montreal Biennale 2002
  - A 6 x 6 x 6 meters cube of I-beams and recycled steel chain to frame a fire place.
- Anarchist Gardener, performance art and installations, Puerto Rico Biennial 2002
  - A parade of an invented God to stop highway traffic in order to construct a series of industrial Zen gardens.
- Floating Sauna, temporary architecture, Casagrande & Rintala, Rosendahl village Norway 2002
  - A floating transparent sauna in the end of a fjord as the public space of a fishing village. 6th Cycle of 20+10+X Architecture Awards winner.
- Treasure Hill, housing area restoration, Taipei Taiwan 2003
  - Ecological rehabilitation realization for an illegal housing area.
- Post Industrial Fleet, naval architecture, CREW*31, Venice Architecture Biennale 2004
  - Architectonic recycling strategies for industrial ships out of duty.
- Human Layer, urban acupuncture, Greetings from London- Helsinki Festival - Taipei on the Move 2004
  - A series of urban acupuncture plans for the cities of London, Helsinki and Taipei.
- Chamber of the Post-Urbanist 104, life style installation, Taipei Museum of Contemporary Art 2005
  - Steel made furniture for post urban cave man style living.
- Future Pavilion, Taiwan Design Expo
  - Cross disciplinary art-architecture exhibition in a ruin of Wei Wu Military Camp, Kaoshioung 2005
- CityZenGarden, installation, together with 3RW Architects, Venice Architecture Biennale 2006
  - Oriental stone garden out of recycled glass in the Venice prison. Video documentation of Taiwanese urban farmers.
- Chen House, Datun Mountains, Taiwan. World Architecture Award 2009.
  - Ruin is when man-made has become part of nature. With this house we were looking forward to design a ruin.
- Bug Dome, WEAK! for SZHK Biennale 2009.
  - Unofficial social club for illegal workers; insect architecture.
- Ruin Academy, Urban Core area in Taipei, Taiwan 2010.
  - Independent cross-over architectural research centre 'set to re-think the industrial city and the man in the box'.
- Cicada, Taipei City, Taiwan 2011
  - Organic bamboo pavilion providing urban acupuncture to the surrounding industrial city. Red Dot Award 2012.
- Sandworm, Beaufort04 Triennial of Contemporary Art, Wenduine, Belgium 2012
  - Willow cathedral finely tuned to celebrate the site specific conditions of the Wenduine tidal beaches. Part architecture, part environmental art, the whole piece is made out of willow and uses what is described as "weak architecture".
