= List of Bungo Stray Dogs chapters =

Cover of the first Bungo Stray Dogs volume released by Kadokawa Shoten

Bungo Stray Dogs is a manga that centers the weretiger Atsushi Nakajima as he joins other gifted people with supernatural powers and use them for different purposes including holding a business, solving mysteries, and carrying out missions assigned by the mafia. The story mainly follows the members of the "Armed Detective Agency" and their everyday lives. Kafka Asagiri and Sango Harukawa began publishing the manga in Kadokawa Shoten's seinen magazine Young Ace in 2012. Kadokawa has compiled the series into twenty-eight tankōbon volumes as of March 2026. The series has been licensed for North America by Yen Press with the first volume being released on December 20, 2016. An anime television series adaptation produced by Bones was directed by Takuya Igarashi and written by Yōji Enokido. An original video animation was bundled with the 13th limited edition manga volume, which was released on 31 August 2017.

In 2018, Bones produced a film titled Bungo Stray Dogs: Dead Apple. A manga adaptation of two volumes by a different artist was developed in the same year. A series of light novels have been written by the same writer and artist from the original manga. While some focus on Osamu Dazai's past and different spin-offs, a gaiden story was produced where Atsushi Nakajima is alternately portrayed as a member from Port Mafia. Another spin-off, Bungo Stray Dogs: Another Story – Yukito Ayatsuji vs. Natsuhiko Kyogoku, was also written.

== Volume list ==
=== Bungo Stray Dogs ===
No.	Original release date	Original ISBN	English release date	English ISBN
1	April 4, 2013	978-4-04-120673-7	December 20, 2016	978-0-316-55470-1
01. "Looking the Gift Tiger in the Mouth"; 02. "A Certain Explosive"; 03. "Yokohama Gangsta Paradise, Part 1"; 04. "Yokohama Gangsta Paradise, Part 2"
After being dropped by an orphanage, the young man Atsushi Nakajima accidentally stops the suicide of a man named Osamu Dazai. Dazai and his partner Doppo Kunikida invite Atsushi to a meal regardless as they reveal themselves to be detectives working for the Detective Agency with their current job being a chase a wild silver tiger. Confessing that he has been chased by the tiger ever since it was attacked by the tiger, Atsushi is taken a warehouse by Dazai to bait the tiger. It is then revealed Atsushi has a skill that allows him to transform in the actual tiger, something that he himself did not know. Dazai uses his own skill to stop the tiger and invites Atsushi to join their group. As a test, Atsushi stops two members from the agency from destroying the headquarters. After passing a test, Atsushi works with the siblings Junichirō and Naomi Tanizaki to assist a young woman, Ichiyō Higuchi. Revealed to be a member a member from the mafia, Higuchi tries to kill the detectives but fails. Her superior, Ryūnosuke Akutagawa, takes her place, nearly killing the detectives but Atsushi's transformation allows him to fight back. The fight is stopped by Dazai, revealed to be an ex-mafia.
2	August 5, 2013	978-4-04-120835-9	March 21, 2017	978-0-316-46814-5
05. "The Fatalist's Sorrow"; 06. "Murder on D Street"; 07. "Kill a Man and Die Thee Too, Part 1"; 08. "Kill a Man and Die Thee Too, Part 2"
3	December 4, 2013	978-4-04-120952-3	June 20, 2017	978-0-316-46815-2
09. "Beauty, Hushed Like a Statue"; 10. "Detective Boys"; 11. "Back in the Day..."; 12. "Rashomon and the Tiger""
4	April 4, 2014	978-4-04-121093-2	September 19, 2017	978-0-316-46816-9
13. "The Rapturous Detective Agency"; 14. "An Unsuitable Occupation for Her"; 15. "Constantly Pushed Back to the Past, Part 1"; 16. "Constantly Pushed Back to the Past, Part 2"
5	August 4, 2014	978-4-04-101539-1	December 19, 2017	978-0-316-46817-6
17. "The First Job"; 18. "Flowers and Autumn Leaves, Snow and Gold"; 19. "The Three-Way Battle"; 20. "A Single Lemon"
6	December 4, 2014	978-4-04-101540-7	April 10, 2018	978-0-316-46818-3
21. "The Brother and the Devil"; 22. "The Strategy of Conflict"; 23. "The Grapes of Wrath Ripen in His Eyes, Part 1"; 24. "The Grapes of Wrath Ripen in His Eyes, Part 2"; Short Story: The Heartless Cur
7	May 2, 2015	978-4-04-102915-2	June 26, 2018	978-0-316-46819-0
25. "Q"; 26. "Will of the Tycoon"; 27. "Upon the Shattering Shores"; 28. "The Emergency Plan"; 29. "Even if My Head Be Mistaken"
8	September 4, 2015	978-4-04-102916-9	September 18, 2018	978-0-316-46820-6
30. "The Silent Tower and the Raven's Feast"; 31. "The Twin Darkness"; 32. "Poe and Ranpo"; 33. "A White Whale, into the Oceans of Heaven"
9	December 29, 2015	978-4-04-102917-6	December 11, 2018	978-0-316-46843-5
34. "The Last Tycoon"; 35. "Rashomon, the Tiger, and the Last Tycoon"; 36. "If I May Lay Down This Burden Today"; 37. "Closing the Party"
10	June 4, 2016	978-4-04-104283-0	March 19, 2019	978-1-9753-0371-6
38. "Slap the Stick"; 39. "Portrait of a Father"; 40. "Walking Alone"; 41. "Addict"; 42. "Sins Granted by the Hand of God"
11	October 4, 2016	978-4-04-104286-1	June 18, 2019	978-1-9753-0449-2
43. "Cherrirs"; 44. "Fitzgerald Rising"; 45. "Fix it, Master Craft"; 46. "The Masked Assassin"
12	April 4, 2017	978-4-04-104287-8	September 13, 2019	978-1-9753-0452-2
47. "Mutual Destruction, Part 1"; 48. "Mutual Destruction, Part 2"; 49. "Mutual Destruction, Part 3"; 50. "Mutual Destruction, Part 4"
13	August 4, 2017	978-4-04-105041-5	December 17, 2019	978-1-9753-0455-3
51. "Echo, Part 1"; 52. "Echo, Part 2"; 53. "Echo, Part 3"; 54. "The Perfect Murder, The Perfect Killer, Part 1"
14	December 4, 2017	978-4-04-106394-1	March 24, 2020	978-1-9753-0458-4
55. "The Perfect Murder, The Perfect Killer, Part 2"; 56. "The Perfect Murder, The Perfect Killer, Part 3"; 57. "Sunday Tragedy, Part 1"; 58. "Sunday Tragedy, Part 2"
15	June 4, 2018	978-4-04-1069356	June 23, 2020	978-1-9753-5921-8
59. "Dogs Hunt Dogs, Part 1"; 60. "Dogs Hunt Dogs, Part 2"; 61. "Dogs Hunt Dogs, Part 3"; 62. "Dogs Hunt Dogs, Part 4"; 63. "Enemies of Society"
16	December 4, 2018	978-4-04-1069356	October 20, 2020	978-1-9753-5924-9
64. "You and I, Children of Sin"; 65. "Dreaming of Butterflies, Part 1"; 66. "Dreaming of Butterflies, Part 2"; 67. "The Sadness of Those Without Wings, Part 1"; 68. "The Sadness of Those Without Wings, Part 2"
17	May 1, 2019	978-4-04-108133-4	December 15, 2020	978-1-9753-1605-1
69. "The Escape, Part 1"; 70. "The Escape, Part 2"; 71. "Bungo Hound Dogs, Part 1"; 72. "Bungo Hound Dogs, Part 2"; 73. "Bungo Hound Dogs, Part 3"
18	December 28, 2019	978-4-04-108134-1	March 23, 2021	978-1-9753-1608-2
74. "Skyfall, Part 1"; 75. "Skyfall, Part 2"; 76. "Skyfall, Part 3"; 77. "Skyfall, Part 4"; 78. "To Threaten God, Part 1"; Bonus: "Mushitarou in the Meanwhile"
19	July 3, 2020	978-4-04-109470-9	July 13, 2021	978-1-9753-2246-5
79. "To Threaten God, Part 2"; 80. "The Strongest Man, Part 1"; 81. "The Strongest Man, Part 2"; 82. "The Greatest Conspirator"; 83. "Towards the Complete Answer"
20	December 4, 2020	978-4-04-109471-6	October 5, 2021	978-1-9753-3647-9
84. "Hero vs. Criminal, Part 1"; 85. "Hero vs. Criminal, Part 2"; 86. "Hero vs. Criminal, Part 3"; 87. "Hero vs. Criminal, Part 4"; 88. "As if Hurtling Downward"
21	August 3, 2021	978-4-04-1113554	June 21, 2022	978-1-9753-45020
89. "Hero War, Gang War, Part 1"; 90. "Hero War, Gang War, Part 2"; 91. "Hero War, Gang War, Part 3; 92. "At the Detective Agency Anew"; 93. "At the Portway to the Sky, Part 1"; 94. "At the Portway to the Sky, Part 2"
22	March 4, 2022	978-4-04-112192-4	January 17, 2023	978-1-9753-61709
95. "At the Portway to the Sky, Part 3"; 96. "At the Portway to the Sky, Part 4"; 97. "At the Portway to the Sky, Part 5"; 98. "At the Portway to the Sky, Part 6"; 99. "At the Portway to the Sky, Part 7"
23	December 28, 2022	978-4-04-112864-0	November 21, 2023	978-1-9753-79018
100. "At the Portway to the Sky, Part 8"; 101. "Drifting in the Depths"; 102. "Wicked Realms Beyond Mankind, Part 1"; 103. "Wicked Realms Beyond Mankind, Part 2"; 104. "The Two "Fuku"s"
24	September 4, 2023	978-4-04-113910-3	August 20, 2024	979-8-8554-0199-8
105. "In a Small Room, Part 1"; 106. "In a Small Room, Part 2"; 107. "In a Small Room, Part 3"; 108. "In a Small Room, Part 4"; 109. "In a Small Room, Part 5"
25	June 4, 2024	978-4-04-115002-3	May 27, 2025	979-8-8554-1528-5
110. "In a Small Room, Part 6"; 111. "You Don't Have What It Takes to Kill Me"; 112. "Why Hast Thou Forsaken Me"; 113. "World Peace"; 114. "Resurrectio"
26	February 4, 2025	978-4-04-115937-8	January 20, 2026	979-8-8554-3047-9
115. "Flecks of Dark Foam"; 116. "To the Small One"; 117. "It Shall Be Done"; 118. "The Unfamiliar"; 119. "Shed on the Precipice of Grief"
27	September 4, 2025	978-4-04-116525-6	July 28, 2026	979-8-8554-3787-4
120. "Spurred to Action"; 121. "The Mysterious Thing Known as a "Heart""; 122. "What Spurs Us to Action"; 123. "The Mysterious Thing Known as a "Heart" That Spurs Us to Action"; 124. "The Tiger Has Always..."
28	March 26, 2026	978-4-04-116803-5	—	—
·Chapter 124.5; ·Chapter 125. We need a hero; .Chapter 126. Rising Back Up!; Chapter 127. Parting Does Not Sound the Bell; Chapter 128. Parting Is...; Chapter 129. Parting

Chapters not published in tankoban format

=== Bungo Stray Dogs: Wan! ===
No.	Original release date	Original ISBN	English release date	English ISBN
1	October 4, 2016	978-4-04-104806-1	February 22, 2022	978-1-9753-4028-5
2	April 4, 2017	978-4-04-105542-7	June 21, 2022	978-1-9753-4029-2
3	September 4, 2017	978-4-04-106090-2	September 20, 2022	978-1-9753-4031-5
4	June 4, 2018	978-4-04-106939-4	February 21, 2023	978-1-9753-4033-9
5	May 1, 2019	978-4-04-108127-3	July 18, 2023	978-1-9753-4035-3
6	December 28, 2019	978-4-04-108128-0	November 21, 2023	978-1-9753-4037-7
7	December 28, 2020	978-4-04-110928-1	April 16, 2024	978-1-9753-4039-1
8	January 26, 2021	978-4-04-110927-4	July 23, 2024	978-1-9753-4041-4
9	March 4, 2022	978-4-04-112185-6	October 15, 2024	978-1-9753-6305-5
10	December 28, 2022	978-4-04-112861-9	February 18, 2025	978-1-9753-9452-3
11	September 4, 2023	978-4-04-113904-2	June 24, 2025	979-8-8554-0169-1
12	June 4, 2024	978-4-04-114996-6	October 28, 2025	979-8-8554-1530-8
13	February 4, 2025	978-4-04-115795-4	June 23, 2026	979-8-8554-2504-8
14	September 4, 2025	978-4-04-116522-5	December 15, 2026	979-8-8554-3865-9
15	March 26, 2026	978-4-04-117123-3	—	—

=== Bungo Stray Dogs: Official Comic Anthology ===
No.	Original release date	Original ISBN	English release date	English ISBN
1	November 4, 2016	978-4-04-104862-7	May 21, 2024	978-1-9753-9708-1
2	May 2, 2017	978-4-04-105541-0	November 19, 2024	978-1-9753-9978-8
3	March 10, 2018	978-4-04-106708-6	April 22, 2025	978-1-9753-9980-1
4	April 4, 2019	978-4-04-108129-7	August 26, 2025	978-1-9753-9982-5
5	February 3, 2023	978-4-04-113167-1	February 24, 2026	978-1-9753-9984-9
6	December 28, 2023	978-4-04-114450-3	August 25, 2026	979-8-8554-0678-8

=== Bungo Stray Dogs: Dead Apple ===
No.	Original release date	Original ISBN	English release date	English ISBN
1	March 10, 2018	978-4-04-106554-9	June 21, 2022	978-1-9753-4021-6
2	May 2, 2018	978-4-04-107290-5	February 21, 2023	978-1-9753-4023-0
3	March 4, 2021	978-4-04-107291-2	May 23, 2023	978-1-9753-4025-4
4	August 4, 2023	978-4-04-112383-6	June 18, 2024	978-1-9753-9450-9

=== Bungo Stray Dogs: Another Story – Yukito Ayatsuji vs. Natsuhiko Kyogoku ===
No.	Original release date	Original ISBN	English release date	English ISBN
1	December 4, 2018	978-4-04-106940-0	November 19, 2019	978-1-9753-5900-3
Prologue. "The Waterfall Spirit Lord's Waterfall / Evening / Light Rain"; 1. "The Old Ravine Cathedral / Noon / Sunny"; 2. "In Front of the Special Division Secret Base / Morning / Sunny"; 3. "Marshland / Afternoon / Cloudy"
2	March 4, 2022	978-4-04-112270-9	December 13, 2022	978-1-9753-6048-1
3. "Marshland / Afternoon / Cloudy"; 4. "Ministry of Justice / Morning / Sunny"; 5. "Inside Passenger Train / Morning / Cloudy"
3	March 26, 2026	978-4-04-117124-0	—	—

=== Bungo Stray Dogs: Beast ===
No.	Original release date	Original ISBN	English release date	English ISBN
1	July 3, 2020	978-4-04-109448-8	August 17, 2021	978-1-9753-2567-1
01. "The Silent Rabid Dog"; 02. "A Certain Bomb"; 03. "The White Reaper"; 04. "The Target"
2	December 4, 2020	978-4-04-109449-5	November 16, 2021	978-1-9753-3713-1
05. "The Conditions"; 06. "Half"; 07. "The Wall of Ideals"; 08. "The Beast, Thyself"; 09. "A Change Meeting"
3	August 3, 2021	978-4-04-111382-0	July 19, 2022	978-1-9753-4493-1
10. "The Plan"; 11. "The Appointed Time"; 12. "Reunuion"; 13. "A Long-Awaited Greeting"; 14. "Guilt"; 15. "Birthday"
4	February 26, 2022	978-4-04-112027-9	January 17, 2023	978-1-9753-6030-6
16. "Evil"; 17. "Friend"; 18. "Good-Bye"; 19. "Promise"; 20. "Agent"; 21. "Truth"; Final Chapter. "Future"

=== Bungo Stray Dogs: Dazai, Chuuya, Age Fifteen ===
No.	Original release date	Original ISBN	English release date	English ISBN
1	February 3, 2023	978-4-04-113363-7	December 12, 2023	978-1-9753-8945-1
2	August 4, 2023	978-4-04-113918-9	August 20, 2024	978-1-9753-9278-9
3	March 4, 2024	978-4-04-114545-6	January 21, 2025	979-8-8554-1247-5
4	October 4, 2024	978-4-04-115595-0	September 23, 2025	979-8-8554-1901-6

=== Bungo Stray Dogs: Storm Bringer ===
No.	Original release date	Original ISBN	English release date	English ISBN
1	September 26, 2025	978-4-04-116555-3	—	—
2	September 25, 2026	978-4-04-117727-3	—	—

=== Bungo Stray Dogs: The Untold Origins of the Detective Agency ===
No.	Original release date	Original ISBN	English release date	English ISBN
1	September 4, 2025	978-4-04-116518-8	—	—
2	March 26, 2026	978-4-04-117126-4	—	—
3	September 4, 2026	978-4-04-117694-8	—	—

== Light novels ==
Ten novels in the series, including a spin-off novel featuring Yukito Ayatsuji and Natsuhiko Kyougoku; written by Asagiri and with illustrations by Harukawa, have been published by Kadokawa. On 8 July 2018, during their panel at Anime Expo, Yen Press announced that they had licensed the light novels.

No.	Original release date	Original ISBN	English release date	English ISBN
1	April 1, 2014	978-4-04-101312-0	August 20, 2019	978-1-9753-0322-8
2	August 1, 2014	978-4-04-101713-5	October 29, 2019	978-1-9753-0324-2
A hitman named Sakunosuke Oda spends a quiet life in the Port Mafia as while he does every job successfully, he refuses to kill enemies. He spends his peaceful moments with the young Osamu Dazai and Ango Sakaguchi while working on his goal of writing a novel. Ango disappears from the mafia, leading the superiors to believe he is a spy from the rival organization Mimic. After Oda rescues him, it is revealed that Ango was a multispy. The leader of the Port Mafia, Ougai Mori, stages the deaths of the children Oda was looking after and make him lose his will to live. Oda decides to avenge the children by facing Mimic's leader André Gide. As the fight ends, Dazai finds Oda in his last moments, requesting him to leave mafia and start a new way of life where he does not have to kill anymore.
3	May 1, 2015	978-4-04-102332-7	February 18, 2020	978-1-9753-0326-6
Gaiden	January 30, 2016	978-4-04-103730-0	July 23, 2024	978-1-9753-9094-5
4	October 1, 2016	978-4-04-104049-2	July 21, 2020	978-1-9753-0328-0
5	March 3, 2018	978-4-04-106535-8	December 29, 2020	978-1-9753-1657-0
6	April 1, 2019	978-4-04-107570-8	May 25, 2021	978-1-9753-1659-4
7	August 1, 2019	978-4-04-107879-2	December 14, 2021	978-1-9753-3711-7
8	February 27, 2021	978-4-04-108517-2	June 21, 2022	978-1-9753-4330-9
9	December 28, 2023	978-4-04-114491-6	March 10, 2026	979-8-8554-2601-4
