= Bungo Stray Dogs: Dead Apple =

2018 animated film by Takuya Igarashi

- Theatrical release poster
- Directed by: Takuya Igarashi
- Screenplay by: Yōji Enokido
- Based on: Bungo Stray Dogs by Kafka Asagiri
- Produced by: Junichirō Tamura; Chiaki Kurakane
- Starring: Kensho Ono; Kishō Taniyama; Mamoru Miyano; Yūto Uemura; Akira Ishida
- Cinematography: Tsuyoshi Kanbayashi
- Edited by: Shigeru Nishiyama
- Music by: Taku Iwasaki
- Production company: Bones
- Distributed by: Kadokawa
- Release date: March 3, 2018
- Running time: 90 minutes
- Country: Japan
- Language: Japanese
- Box office: ¥550 million ($4.98 million)

Bungo Stray Dogs: Dead Apple (Japanese: 文豪ストレイドッグス デッドアップル, Hepburn: Bungō Sutorei Doggusu Deddo Appuru) is a 2018 Japanese animated film produced by Bones. It is directed by Takuya Igarashi and written by Kafka Asagiri and Yōji Enokido. It is based on the manga Bungo Stray Dogs written by Asagiri and illustrated by Sango Harukawa. Taking place after events of the second season of the anime television series, a group of detectives learn of a string of apparent suicide cases that have been happening to people with supernatural powers. Atsushi Nakajima and his friends thus go to confront the culprit of this case, a man named Tatsuhiko Shibusawa. Returning voice actors include Kensho Ono, Kishō Taniyama, Mamoru Miyano, Yūto Uemura, and Akira Ishida.

The film was conceived by Asagiri, who wished to continue the story after the television series had concluded in late 2016. The team aimed to create a deep storyline loosely based on the real Tatsuhiko Shibusawa while balancing the impact of the role of the film's characters, most notably Atsushi and Chūya Nakahara. Granrodeo, Screen Mode and Luck Life provided the film's theme songs. A two-volume manga adaptation of the film was released in Japan, and two light novels were also written to promote the film.

The film earned a total of ¥550 million (US$4.98 million) at the Japanese box office, while winning multiple awards from the magazine Newtype, most notably the "Theatrical Film Award". Critical reception to the film was generally positive for the handling of the character's roles and the visuals, though many felt that newcomers to the series would have difficulty understanding the story.

== Plot ==
Six years before the main story, the most violent struggle in Yokohama was "The Dragon Head Conflict," which lasted for 88 days, involved many organizations, and resulted in numerous deaths. The night before its conclusion, when Osamu Dazai was still in Port Mafia, he and Chūya Nakahara discovered a man named Tatsuhiko Shibusawa. In the present, the Armed Detective Agency is called upon to investigate the apparent suicide cases of hundreds of supernatural ability-users around the globe, which occurred when a mysterious fog passed over their countries. The Special Operations Division deduce that this incident is tied to Shibusawa, now a self-proclaimed "collector". The night before the Agency is to commence operations, Atsushi Nakajima has an unsettling dream of his past in an orphanage, where an out-of-place door painted with a white tiger is engulfed in fog. He is awakened by his roommate Kyōka Izumi, who also dreamed of fog. The two soon realise that Yokohama has been engulfed in the mysterious fog, and everyone but the various ability-users have disappeared from the city.

Kyōka and Atsushi meet with their superior Doppo Kunikida, who reveals that the deaths of ability-users were due to their abilities turning on them. Shibusawa is revealed to have created the fog to draw out Yokohama's gifted, turning their abilities into jewels for his collection while powering the fog. He has allied himself with Dazai and Fyodor Dostoevsky. Kyōka and Atsushi make contact with government agent Ango Sakaguchi, who had located the Agency's other ability-users, all of whom are fighting their own abilities. As Kunikida leaves to fight Doppo Poet, the duo encounter mafia member Ryūnosuke Akutagawa, who is fighting his ability, Rashōmon. While each of them duel their own abilities, Atsushi deduces that subduing the ability involves destroying an embedded jewel in them, and defeats his white tiger. Kyōka faces her fear of merging with Demon Snow to become a killing machine, and resolves to save people with her ability. Akutagawa is forced to think outside the box when combatting his ability. Atsushi is unable to use his ability, so Kyōka and Akutagawa decide to journey to Shibusawa's base alone.

Fyodor finds two jewels: one which can summon all gifted within sight, and another which can crystallise abilities after their users have died. Dazai, who was secretly working against Shibusawa, nullifies them, depriving the fog of its power source. However, having anticipated this, Shibusawa stabs Dazai with a poisoned knife, intending to steal his ability and transform Dazai into the core of the "dragon" – the chaos of all special abilities – to destroy Yokohama. As the dragon is summoned, it wreaks havoc. A gifted agency in London called Order of the Clock Tower dispatches a fire gifted to Yokohama in order to destroy the city with the dragon to prevent it from spreading. However, Ango contacts Chuya, who releases Corruption and successfully destroys the dragon and revives Dazai.

Fyodor slits Shibusawa's throat, allowing him to regain his lost memories, just as Atsushi looks within himself and resolves to open the white door within the fog. Atsushi remembers that when he was a child, he was tortured by Shibusawa to draw out his ability – the "tiger" and the antithesis of all special abilities. However, the torture backfired and Atsushi lost control of his ability from that point onwards, turning into a tiger and killing Shibusawa in the past. Despite this trauma, Atsushi accepts his actions and powers and recovers his tiger persona. Atsushi rushes to Shibusawa's base, his power having returned as the latter revives, stronger than ever, to battle Atsushi, Kyōka and Akutagawa. Together, these three permanently defeat Shibusawa. Fyodor remains in the shadows, stating he has yet to accomplish his objective.

== Production ==
The film was initially intended to be an original video animation, planned when the second season of the TV series ended in 2016. Kadokawa Dwango was willing to make a film. A compilation film was suggested but creator Kafka Asagiri was willing to write a new script because he felt the fans deserved something better. The staff looked forward to the challenging dialogues and sought visuals which would captivate the fans. Some of the staff went to a campsite which posed difficulty in emailing Asagiri for confirmation. The main focus of the plot was on the characters Atsushi, Kyoka, and Akutagawa. Akira Ishida, who played Fyodor, enjoyed how the character was explored with a larger role in the feature. Atsushi's actor, Yūto Uemura, was surprised by the quality of the film's visuals, believing Bones had improved their work from the television series, while joking about how his character often repeated the name of his partner, Kyoka Izumi. Uemura added that he felt honored to continue in the role due to its importance and impact on his career. The film's antagonist, Tatsuhiko Shibusawa, is loosely based on the writer with the same name. His clothing and hair were made to give him a mysterious atmosphere. Production staff met with Sumiko Shibusawa, the wife of the real Shibusawa, for her approval of the artwork.

The Bones staff went to a campsite retreat to work on the details of the production. They hoped to create a film with a high rewatch value, and intended to overwhelm the audience with the use of complex dialogue. They used the apple motif common in many fairy tales, myths and historical literature. Asagiri conceived the idea of the story, starting with Dazai's death and how he would be revived across the story, though he wondered what the cause of death should be. Another idea for Dazai's characterization in the film was related to how he had previously treated the other characters. Original ideas that were not seen in the final product involved Sakanosuke Oda's legacy, with the late mafia member saving Atsushi through his ability to see the future. Atsushi's characterization and dynamic with Kyoka were altered in order to generate a bigger impact for the film's climax; Asagiri stated that this character arc helped to further progress the storyline. Nevertheless, while Atsushi becomes stronger across the film, Asagiri stated that the idea behind his character stayed true to his original persona of being a weak and relatable person. Shibusawa's action would have also generated a bigger impact in the original script, with the power of the supernatural mist he created changing the form of Yokohama. The actions from Fyodor Dostoevsky confused director Takuya Igarashi due to the way Asagiri made the interactions with Dazai and Tatsuhiko Shibusawa, later noting that the film was quite different from other films due to its focus on mysteries such as how Dazai tried to stop Shibusawa by allying with him. Due to the impact of Chuya Nakahara's actions when confronting Dazai, Asagiri had to balance the script so that the trio of Atsushi, Kyoka and Akutagawa also have an important role. The scene involving Yukichi Fukuzawa and Ōgai Mori interacting while facing their opposite's sentient's gifts was inspired by Dazai and Kunikida's dynamic from a light novel which was popular among fans of the series.

=== Promotion and release ===
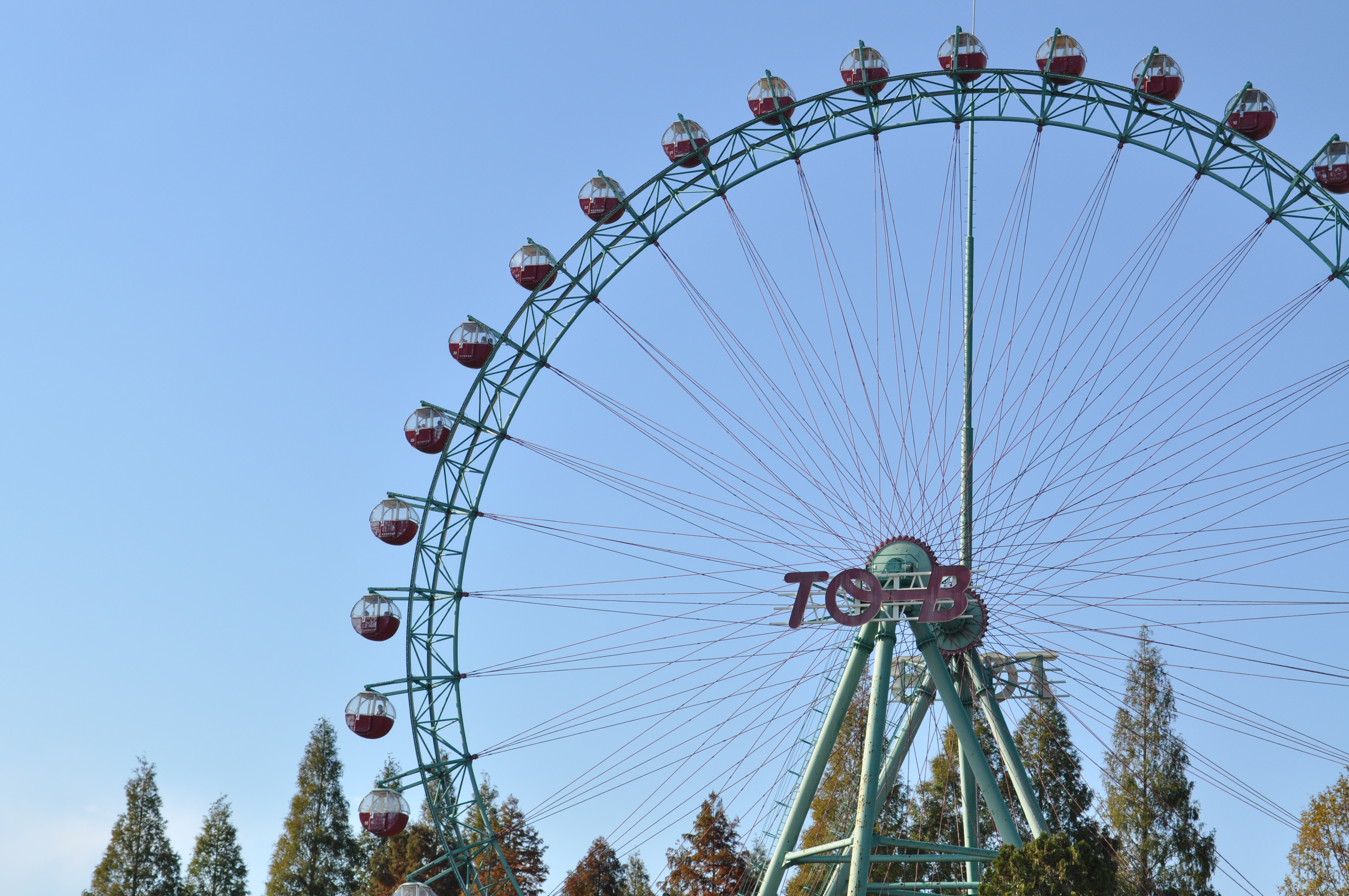
Tobu Zoo promoted Dead Apple through their mascot and the character Atsushi.

The film project was announced at the Mayo(w)i Inu-tachi no Utage Sono Ni event on February 19, 2017. Stamp rallies were held in Osaka and Yokohama to collect pictures of the characters. Another promotion of the film involved a mobile phone game titled Yumeiro Cast featuring Atsushi and other characters from the film. Tobu Zoo in Miyashiro, Saitama Prefecture, displayed pictures of Atsushi alongside the tiger mascot "Rocky-kun". During the promotion of this event, Uemura collaborated in making multiple announcements which were run between February 24 and March 3, 2018. Animate Cafe also produced items based on the characters in order to promote the film. In promoting the film, Asagiri wrote two light novels published in Japan: Beast, an alternative story where Atsushi and Akutagawa had switched jobs, and 15, a prequel which explains how Dazai met Chuya while working for the mafia.

Titled Bungo Stray Dogs: Dead Apple, the film premiered on March 3, 2018, with the staff and cast from the anime series returning to reprise their roles. The film was streamed in the United States and Canada during May 2018, and was streamed by Crunchyroll starting in November of the same year. Funimation streamed the English dub on June 21, 2019.

The music was composed by Taku Iwasaki. The opening theme song is "Deadly Drive" by Granrodeo and the ending theme is "Bokura" by Luck Life. For the film's climax, the theme song "Reason Living" by Screen Mode was used. The single "Deadly Drive" was released in Japan on February 21, 2018. The film's original soundtrack was released on March 8, 2018. The Blu-ray was released on December 5, 2018.

The film was adapted into a manga series published in two volumes by Kadokawa during 2018.

== Reception ==
The film opened in 74 theatres and earned ¥78,002,000 (about US$740,000) in its first official weekend (Saturday–Sunday), ranking No. 7. In total, it has of 86,688,808 yen (about US$820,900). In its second weekend it dropped to No. 9, earning ¥85,031,700 (about US$799,200) from Friday to Sunday. It grossed a total of ¥550 million ($4.98 million) at the Japanese box office. The home media volumes of the film sold 13,125 blu-rays and 10,599 DVDs in their release weeks, and sold a total of 14,086 blu-rays and 12,269 DVDs in Japan by May 2019.

In the Newtype Anime Awards from 2018, the film won the category "Best Work (Theatrical Screening)". Chūya Nakahara, Osamu Dazai and Kyōka Izumi also appeared in the character polls. The audio was popular with "Deadly Drive" earning second place behind "Reason!!" while Taku Iwasaki was recognized with the award for "best soundtrack". Takuya Igarashi received the award for best director while Yoji Enokido was second in "Best Screenplay".

Critics praised the film but were divided in terms of what audience would enjoy it more. Manga Tokyo recommended the film for fans of Bungo Stray Dogs due to the return of its characters and the commentary of tragedy explored around the main characters and antagonists. Anime News Network praised the main film for its fight scenes and the emotional character arcs, but criticized the handling of some subplots related with Shibusawa. Despite difficulties for newcomers to this film, Retorno Anime enjoyed the handling of Osamu Dazai and praised the film's soundtrack. Atomix agreed that fans will enjoy it more than newcomers and praised the multiple character arcs Bones provided, but still felt the climax could have been executed better. Another area that received major acclaim by Atomix was the animation in the first half of the film. Manga Tokyo also liked the animation displayed in the character designs and fight scenes.

Some critics focused on the characters featured in the story and their traits. Manga Tokyo did not enjoy the handling of Atsushi Nakajima, and found him weaker than his anime persona, who embraced the power of the white tiger during season two. Nevertheless, the writer still found the cast entertaining, noting their comical traits. On the other hand, Anime News Network enjoyed Atsushi's role in the film for the surprising relationship he had with Shibusawa. Retorno Anime highly praised Atsushi, stating his past is one of the most interesting parts of the film, extending the original works while adding further depth. Retorno also praised the handling of Osamu Dazai and his mysterious intentions. Atomix found the mysterious characters interesting as their roles as allies or enemies is explored throughout the film. Retorno Anime also noted the inclusion of Port Mafia characters to surprise their fans.
