= Atsushi Nakajima (Bungo Stray Dogs) =

Fictional character from Bungo Stray Dogs

- Bungo Stray Dogs character
- Atsushi Nakajima as drawn by Sango Harukawa
- First appearance: Bungo Stray Dogs, chapter 1: "Losing a Tiger may be a Blessing in Disguise" (2012)
- Created by: Kafka Asagiri; Sango Harukawa
- Portrayed by: Yūki Torigoe
- Voiced by: Yūto Uemura (Japanese); Max Mittelman (English)

Atsushi Nakajima (Japanese: 中島 敦, Hepburn: Nakajima Atsushi) is a fictional character and the main protagonist of the manga series Bungo Stray Dogs, written by Kafka Asagiri and illustrated by Sango Harukawa. Atsushi also appears in the light novels based on the series and the 2018 film Bungo Stray Dogs: Dead Apple. At the start of the series, he is an 18 year old orphan who was thrown out of an orphanage—an experience that motivates him to find a reason to live. Atsushi's age does not change throughout the series. Upon meeting detective Osamu Dazai, Atsushi learns he has a supernatural power, an ability, called "Beast Beneath the Moonlight" that allows him to turn into a large white tiger with incredible strength, speed, durability, and regenerative capabilities. Despite his lack of confidence, Atsushi has a pure heart and is protective of others, hoping to become a strong person by helping the weak.

Atsushi was created by Asagiri as a weak-but-relatable character searching for his purpose in life. The character is based on a story by author Atsushi Nakajima about a young man becoming a tiger. The character has been voiced by Yūto Uemura in Japanese and Max Mittelman in English. The authors and anime staff of the series enjoyed working on Atsushi due to his interactions with other characters and his impact on the audience.

The initial reaction to Atsushi has been mixed; critics had differing opinions on having a weak-willed character as the lead. However, writers appreciated his rivalry with Port Mafia's Ryūnosuke Akutagawa and his care of former assassin Kyoka Izumi; they felt Atsushi became stronger because of these relationships, which formed his character arc.

== Creation and development ==
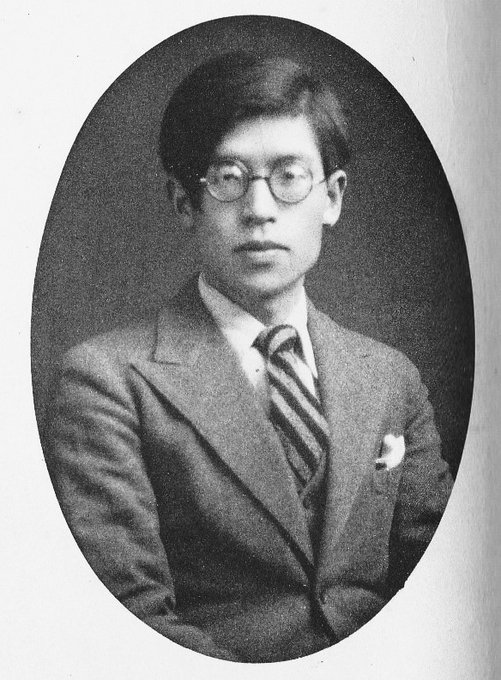
Atsushi Nakajima was the inspiration behind the Bungo Stray Dogs character.

Manga writer Kafka Asagiri originally created Atsushi Nakajima as a 24-year-old man instead of an 18-year-old. To hint at the character's ability to transform into a white tiger, artist Sango Harukawa depicted him with white hair and a long, dangling belt resembling a tail. Harukawa said it would be easy to draw the main character in white in any scenario. The character was based on the writer Atsushi Nakajima and his 1942 story Sangetsuki about a character who uncontrollably transforms into a tiger. The white tiger from Nakajima's story is something artist Sango Harukawa always wanted to draw. As the manga was starting, Asagiri wrote about four lines of character settings and send it to Harukawa via email. Then, pointing to Atsushi Nakajima's setting drawing, a setting drawing like this comes up. Asagiri purposely decided to make the main character a person with no personality. That way, it would be easier to connect with the unique characters around the reader. In terms of roles, if Atsushi is the hero, Dazai is the sage. Like the role of Merlin to King Arthur. His design is also meant to heavily contrast Akutagawa.

At the setting stage, the manga author was unsure whether to make the main character a strong character, or to have a relatively standard character as the main character and surround him with strong characters. In the end, he decided on a structure in which the main character is confused and at the mercy of strange people. However, Atsushi Nakajima is actually an author who often appears in textbooks. The author was impressed by responses by fans who wanted to learn the truth about Nakajima's books. The weak parts of himself that he would like to get rid of come to the surface every now and then, tormenting him. He struggled, thought, and worried to shake it off. That is what he want to put in the depth of the story. His design is also meant to heavily contrast Akutagawa.

Atsushi's character arc involves growing more self-confident after being shunned by his orphanage. He is aided by Osamu Dazai who acts as a mentor but rather than constantly aid him, he leaves the protagonist alone when it comes to actions should he do. Though their relationship is initially awkward, there was focus in Atsushi maturing across the story for giving him the responsibility of protecting Yokohama. Throughout the story, he remembers kneeling in front of a stained glass window while a committee banishes him from the orphanage. Anime director Takuya Igarashi invoked this scene to signify Atsushi's emotional trauma. Rather than adding gore to Atsushi's fights with his rival Ryūnosuke Akutagawa, Igarashi showed the characters in silhouette in front of a red background. His relationship with Akutagawa was compared more to shonen manga byt the anime staff despite the series being a seinen manga.

=== Portrayal in adaptations ===
When reading the manga for the first time, anime director Yasuomi Umetsu was impressed by how detective Osamu Dazai mentored Atsushi and Akutagawa. Their relationship was shown in the anime's opening and closing sequences, where Dazai treats his protégés condescendingly while also saying that he is influenced by them. The theme song used in the second season of the anime, "Reason Living" by Screen Mode, focuses on Atsushi's attempts to become a stronger person.

For the 2018 film Bungo Stray Dogs: Dead Apple, Asagiri told fans to focus on the psychological development of Atsushi, Kyoka Izumi, and Akutagawa. The dynamic between Atsushi and Kyoka was changed to focus on Atsushi's psychological growth. An idea not present in the film was to have the reanimated mafia member Sakunosuke Oda save Atsushi from an unknown danger. Asagiri said that throughout the film, Atsushi stays true to his original persona of a weak and relatable person, despite having scenes showing his inner strength.

In the Japanese anime and film, Atsushi is voiced by actor Yūto Uemura. Uemura said that while his character initially cannot stand by himself, he appears to become stronger as the series progresses. According to the voice actor, a major impact on Atsushi's development is how he finds Kyoka, wishes to protect her from a dark fate, and becomes a stronger person for doing so. Uemura liked the scene in which Atsushi encounters Akutagawa in the airship Moby Dick, where the actor tried to show Atsushi's strength of will in contesting with Akutagawa. Despite having difficulty in showing the character's strength, Uemura believed some lines Atsushi has when interacting with people from the Guild gave a good impression of his power. Upon first hearing Uemura, the manga and anime staff were surprised by his performance and regarded him as fit for playing the character. In the making of the film Dead Apple, Uemura felt honored to keep playing Atsushi, mainly due to the character's importance and his impact on his career. When the series is dubbed in English, Atsushi is voiced by American voice actor Max Mittelman.

== Appearances ==
=== In Bungo Stray Dogs ===
Atsushi first appears in the manga as an abandoned orphan who usually is eager to rob the next person he sees in order to survive. When he saves detective Osamu Dazai from drowning, Dazai and his partner, Doppo Kunikida, realizes that Atsushi is a weretiger and asks him to work at his Armed Detective Agency. Atsushi accepts and meets other members who also possess supernatural powers. He also learns he is the target of the Port Mafia, who seek him in his tiger form. During an encounter with the young mafia assassin Kyoka Izumi, Atsushi becomes concerned that she is forced to kill and ends up becoming her mentor and caretaker. Atsushi first met Kyōka while assisting Akiko Yosano with shopping. Later, he learned that Kyōka had taken 35 lives and wished to leave that life behind. Moved by her resolve, he stepped in to save her from a bomb strapped to her.; The leader of the detective agency, Yukichi Fukuzawa, recruits her, putting Kyoka under Atsushi's care in the apartment he has provided for them. During another encounter with the Port Mafia, who want Kyoka back, Atsushi is able to use his shapeshifting powers to battle the mafia's Ryūnosuke Akutagawa.

After Atsushi escapes from the mafia, the detective agency learns of, and fights with, a group known as the Guild. During those battles, Kyoka is arrested, and Atsushi learns that the bounty on his head was placed by the Guild; Their leader Francis Scott Key Fitzgerald claims that a hidden treasure is bound up with Atsushi's powers. Atsushi, being the agency's strongest detective, is sent to attack the Guild. Atsushi clashes with Akutagawa to stop the airship Moby Dick from falling on the city, and defeaT Fitzgerald. Kyoka stops the airship, passing a test for joining the detective agency.

Following the Guild's demise, Atsushi is conflicted about learning that someone who mistreated him at the orphanage died in a traffic accident. When a group known as the Rats in the House of the Dead, led by Fyodor Dostoyevsky, infects the leaders of the Port Mafia and the detective agency with a deadly virus, Atsushi finds himself once again fighting the mafia. However, the return of the mentor of the leaders of both groups, Natsume Sōseki, leads to another alliance between the factions. Atsushi and Akutagawa search for the person responsible for the virus and face a Rats member named Ivan Goncharov. During the battle, when Atsushi is weakened, Akutagawa gives him strength. Atsushi comes to the conclusion that, while he understands his torturer, he is sad because he never got the chance to kill him. Although victorious, the duo do not find the origin of the virus. As their superiors search for them, Atsushi and Akutagawa decide to have a fight in the next six months to end their rivalry.

While preparing to face Akutagawa, Atsushi is attacked by Nikolai Gogol, one of Fyodor's partners from the terrorist organization Decay of Angels, and is wounded. The agency blames Decay of Angels for a murder inspired by a scene from a book Fitzgerald was looking for. After Atsushi recovers, he and Kyoka learn that Dazai has been imprisoned. However, they manage to receive orders from him. In order to save the agency, they are told to erase the content of the book the Angels used. As the Agency faces defeat, they form an alliance with Fitzgerald and later the mafia. Across the multiple fights, it is revealed there is another person above Dostoevsky, the leader of the Decay of Angels is Ōchi Fukuchi, the leader of the Hunting Dogs. Fydor then proceeds to create a singularity using the Sword which was previously imbedded in Bram's body and turning Fukichi into a God called Amenogozen. With help from his later caretaker who was posing as Dazai in hallucinations to support him, Atsushi manages to defeat Amenogozen and then manages to corner and kill Fyodor with help from the allies. Afterwards, the Detective Agency is forced to close, and Atsushi finds himself in another dimension when Kyoka gives him a page of the Book.

=== Other appearances ===
Yūki Torigoe as Atsushi Nakajima in the live-action film, Beast

Atsushi appears in the film Bungo Stray Dogs: Dead Apple, where the detective agency learns of a series of suicides by people who possess supernatural powers. Through their superiors, Atsushi and Kyoka realize that the suicides are the result of a fog that causes a power's avatar to kill the possessor. During the film, Atsushi, Kyoka, and Akutagawa lose their powers but manage to defeat their avatars. However, Atsushi is left alone, as he cannot recover his will to fight. He then understands that, when he was in the orphanage, he was tortured by Tatsuhiko Shibusawa, the same man who created the fog. In a fit of rage, Atsushi kills Shibusawa, who is then revived by Fyodor. Atsushi embraces his power, which he calls Byakko and will-to-fight, and once again kills Shibusawa, with Kyoka and Akutagawa's help, which results in the fog disappearing. Atsushi also appears in the manga adaptation of the film.

Other spin-offs of the series include a play in which Atsushi is portrayed by Yūki Torigoe. Atsushi also appears in the yonkoma manga series Wan!, where he is depicted as deformed. In the mobile phone game Bungo Stray Dogs: Tales of the Lost, Atsushi is a playable character. He is also a guest character in the game Yume 100.

Atsushi appears in the light novel BEAST: White Akutagawa, Black Atsushi, which depicts Atsushi as a member of the Port Mafia. Working for the boss Dazai alongside his partner Kyoka, Atsushi shows signs of suffering post-traumatic stress disorder, which the novel's incarnation of Dazai takes advantage of to control him. When Atsushi encounters Akutagawa in the novel, Dazai tells Atsushi to become a detective alongside Kyoka before killing himself. He also appears in the light novel Bungo Stray Dogs: 55 Minutes, where the Agency is given the job of finding a thief.

== Reception ==
=== Popular ===
In promoting the film Dead Apple, Tobu Zoo—in Miyashiro, Saitama Prefecture—displayed a picture of Atsushi alongside the tiger mascot "Rocky-kun". During the promotion of this event, Atsushi's voice actor, Yūto Uemura, participated in making multiple announcements that were run between February 24 and March 3, 2018. In another promotion, Atsushi joined in a crossover with the mascot Hello Kitty. In a poll by Gakuen Babysitters, Atsushi was voted as one of the male characters fans wanted to have as their younger brother. In 2016 Newtype polls, he was voted as the third- and seventh-best male character. In an Anime!Anime! poll, Atsushi and Akutagawa were voted as one of the best anime rivals turned into allies. Atsushi was also voted as the best Uemura character in a poll from AnimeAnime.

=== Critical ===
Critical reception of Atsushi's character has been mixed. Upon his introduction into the manga series, The Fandom Post said that his ability to become a tiger offered him the power to do good rather than making him feel cursed. On the other hand, Reel Run Down considered Atsushi one of the weakest characters due to his constant insecurity despite his multiple achievements; as a result, the reviewer regarded his abusive background as more of a stale running joke than a terrifying experience. Otaku USA stated that, while Atsushi becomes a hero of the story, he is overshadowed by others whose characters the reviewer found more interesting. Anime News Network felt that, while initially weak, Atsushi could become, little-by-little, a stronger person, due to the way Dazai guides him. The Fandom Post saw Atsushi as the readers' guide to the series since he was a newcomer whose introduction to the detective agency made it known to the readers as well. His final fight against Akutagawa in the first season received a positive response.

Anime News Network deemed Atsushi charming when he was protective of Kyoka Izumi in the beginning, saw parallels between the two characters based on their traumatic pasts, and described the bond they have when interacting as strong. Manga.Tokyo agreed in terms of the parallels between Atsushi and Kyoka, and wondered how their relationship would develop after Atsushi saves her, as they were enemies when meeting for the first time. While criticizing the anime's handling of how Atsushi was made to feel sad for the death of one of his torturers, Anime News Network appreciated the new bond he formed with former Guild member Lucy Maud Montgomery; feeling that Lucy became attracted to Atsushi, the reviewer expected that either a formal romance would develop between these two characters or a love triangle alongside Kyoka, who also had a strong bond with Atsushi. As a result, the writer said the story would benefit from this type of subplot since Bungo Stray Dogs rarely contained romance. While analyzing the story, Gamerant Saw that both Atsushi and Kyoka shared the saddest episode in the entire series for how they deal with parenting issues, though the former's case was harder to put into words as a result of the caretaker's constant abuse on the protagonist and how this shaped his growth and trauma.

The rivalry between Atsushi and Akutagawa has also received positive reviews. Otaku USA stated that Atsushi's insecurities contrasted with Akutagawa's tendency to be violent in a mad quest to gain the respect of his peers. Manga.Tokyo made similar comments and characterized the two as yin and yang. The exploration of the interactions between these two characters was commented to improve both of their characterizations during the anime's second-season climax, where both Atsushi and Akutagawa come to accept their differences and make a temporary peace in order to join forces to defeat Fitzgerald and the Guild. The Fandom Post appreciated how the rivalry progressed across the story and felt that the final battle was enjoyable, with Fitzgerald showing signs of humanity. Manga.Tokyo praised the appeal of the rivalry between Atsushi and Akutagawa due to Akutagawa's mysterious hatred of Atsushi during the anime's first season. When this scene was animated, The Fandom Post saw it as one of the best sequences in the series, which explored how the two characters felt during their interactions. As to the anime's third-season finale, Anime News Network enjoyed the portrayal of Atsushi's thoughts regarding his abusive caretaker since he had a serious attitude when he talked about them while interacting with Akutagawa, feeling this made Atsushi appealing.

Among other relationships besides the one Atsushi has with Akutagawa, Comic Book Resources stated that his student and mentorship portrayal with Dazai is popular due to how they trust each other while further amplifying his relationship with Akutagawa in the process since both have the same mentors. In another article, the same site noted that despite Atsushi being an orphan, the caretaker was his adoptive father with Dazai also feeling like a proper father figure to the protagonist of the manga. Furthermore, he said that despite Atsushi's weak personality, he stands out as a fighter thanks to his character arc.

Manga.Tokyo criticized Atsushi's characterization in the film Dead Apple, compared with his stronger portrayal in the second season of the anime series. On the other hand, Anime News Network described Atsushi's journey as the strongest appeal of the film. With the villains being regarded as weak, Atsushi's central conflict was said to have a major impact on the plot due to his realization of having killed one of the orphanage's abusers in a fit of rage, which suppressed the trauma. Once Atsushi accepted being the tiger, Anime News Network felt that he participated, alongside Akutagawa, in one of the most interesting fight scenes.

=== Analysis ===
In "To the Stray Dogs: A Case Study on Multimedia Virtuosity and Japanese Literary Tribute in Kafka Asagiri and Sango Harukawa's Bungo Stray Dogs" Eunice Grance Domingo says that the Atsushi from the manga series serves as a separate individual from the literally artist despite sharing several similarities and is thus is not defined by him. The authors instead created the protagonist by mixing "intertextuality with the metafictional" similar to how Osamu Dazai is not exactly like the real life writer. Their relationship was found important due to the connection as deurterogamists, and mentor to the protaognist, making him nearly another protagonist.

In "Análise da representação de autores da literatura japonesa em Bungo Stray Dogs", Ana Clara Sousa Araújo said that the Bungo Stray Dogs help to promote real life authors by using their names for Atsushi and the rest. Atsushi finds himself lost when he discovers that the director of his former orphanage, the person he hated most in his life for always keeping him locked up, did so to prevent Atsushi from discovering who he really was, wishing to protect him from the truth about himself and his unconscious, savage actions. This point demonstrates the complexity of how different human ideals can affect reality, with situations where a completely inhumane and malicious action can be interpreted by another as a simple act of condolence. However, Atsushi is commonly considered an overshadowed protagonist, sometimes forgotten as the true protagonist by new readers or those who don't consume the manga itself. However, as the reading progresses, his important development in the work becomes noticeable, especially in his connections to the literary work "Sangetsuki" or The Moon over the Mountain, translated as "The Moon over the Mountain" or "The Beast under the Moonlight," by the classic author Atsushi Nakajima.

In "An Analysis Characters and Theme of Bungo Stray Dogs: Beast By Kafka Asagiri", Yani Octafia and Alliefa Nassandria Suwito from Universitas Pamulang said the series is common for portraying Atsushi's mental trauma over his tortures by his headmaster. He and Akutagawa and Dazai show notable parallels in the narrative with Atsushi attempting to present himself with a kind demeanor instead. However, this kind demeanor is not present in the novel Bungo Stray Dogs: Beast where he instead he is portrayed as both stoic and cold as his alternate self blindly follows the orders of Dazai. As Beast features Akutagawa as the protaogonist, Atsushi instead is written as an antagonist and with nearly an opposite characterization from him. Despite Atsuhi and Dazai being allies, the former is poorly treated by his boss when compared the original portrayal in the manga series, giving a sense of Atsushi being manipulated through his trauma. His personality is similar to that of how the American Psychiatric Association's analysis in regards to how a person can be manipulated through arousal and request orders
