= Reason Living =

2016 official single by Screen Mode

- Cover of "Reason Living" featuring Atsushi Nakajima and Ryūnosuke Akutagawa

Single by Screen Mode
- Released: October 26, 2016
- Length: 4:14

"Reason Living" is a song by Screen Mode. It is the second opening theme song for Bungo Stray Dogs; a single was released on October 26, 2016. It was composed by Masatomo Ota while the lyrics were provided by Yohei Matsui. The single contains both title song and "Distance". Its short form was first made available on August 28, 2016. It focuses on Atsushi Nakajima's attempts to become a stronger person. The full song can be listened online on Screen Mode's YouTube account. The song was reused in the 2018 film Bungo Stray Dogs: Dead Apple.

== Track listing ==
No.	Title	Length
1.	"Reason Living"	4:14
2.	"Distance"	4:58
Total length:		4:14

== Chart performance ==
On the Oricon's Weekly Singles Charts, "Reason Living" peaked at number 64 after being on the charts for 3 weeks. The song was ranked as 9th best theme song by Newtype magazine in 2017.
