= List of Bungo Stray Dogs characters =

The following is a list of characters from the manga series Bungo Stray Dogs.

== Creation and design ==
The characters of Bungo Stray Dogs were created by Kafka Asagiri and designed by Sango Harukawa. Asagiri noted that in the making of the story, the character designs were developed first rather than their plot lines, as the restrictions of the plot might cause the characters to become too flat. The manga originated from Asagiri's idea to gather multiple famous late authors and draw them as young adults and teenagers with supernatural powers, and in his hope that more people would find an interest in literature with the series.

== Major characters ==
The following are recurring, major characters from the manga series Bungo Stray Dogs.

=== Atsushi Nakajima ===
Atsushi Nakajima (中島 敦, Nakajima Atsushi)
Voiced by: Yūto Uemura, Lynn (young) (Japanese); Max Mittelman (English)
Named after Atsushi Nakajima. Belonging to Armed Detective Agency. A young man who previously resided in an orphanage before being thrown out by his abusive caretakers under the claim of being "too old" after he turned eighteen. The impact of the abuse he went through severely traumatized him and drives his will to fight in order to find a reason to live. He is willing to risk his life for others and is extremely selfless, because he believes protecting others is what gives his life worth. He slowly gains more confidence as the series progresses. His ability, Beast Beneath the Moonlight (月下獣, Gekkajū), references Nakajima's short story The Moon Over the Mountain (山月記, Sangetsuki), also known as Tiger Poet (人虎伝, Jinko-den). It allows him to turn into a large white tiger with incredible strength, speed, regenerative capabilities, and durability. Initially, he had no control over it, and retained no memory of the events that occurred whilst transformed, but gradually learns how to utilize his ability properly and gain control over it.

=== Osamu Dazai ===
Osamu Dazai (太宰 治, Dazai Osamu)
Voiced by: Mamoru Miyano (Japanese); Kaiji Tang (English)
Named after Osamu Dazai. Belonged by Armed Detective Agency. A feared former executive of the Port Mafia, now working with the Agency. He takes Atsushi under his wing, which is the primary reason Akutagawa resents Atsushi, as Dazai had abused and later abandoned Akutagawa as his "mentor" when he left the Port Mafia. He is referred to as a "suicide maniac," most notably by Kunikida, due to his constant suicide attempts, contemplations of a peaceful death, and his obsession with double suicide. Despite his carefree, relaxed demeanor he is also extremely cunning, intelligent, skilled, and brutal. His ability, No Longer Human (人間失格, Ningen Shikkaku), allows him to nullify any ability he comes into physical contact with. This includes skill users and objects that are formed by skills (for example, he dissolves items created by Kunikida's ability), the latter of which was confirmed in the light novel Osamu Dazai's Entrance Exam (文豪ストレイドッグス 太宰治の入社試験, Bungō Sutorei Doggusu: Dazai Osamu no Nyūsha Shiken). He spends his free time listening to music and annoying Chūya.

=== Ryūnosuke Akutagawa ===
Ryūnosuke Akutagawa (芥川 龍之介, Akutagawa Ryūnosuke)
Voiced by: Kensho Ono (Japanese); Brian Beacock (English)
Named after Ryūnosuke Akutagawa. A 20-year-old member of the Port Mafia. His ability, Rashōmon (羅生門, Rashōmon), allows him to control any cloth he wears, which he mainly exercises on his overcoat, turning it into sharp blades of fabric or beastly jaws to rip his opponent apart. Rashōmon also has the power to eat away at the fabric of space itself, granting Akutagwa a shield impenetrable by conventional means. A former apprentice of Dazai, Akutagwa desperately seeks his approval even after Dazai's defection, and heavily dislikes Atsushi for gaining that easily while his own attempts to do so fail. He is noted to be excessively murderous, to the point if presented with a problem, his first thought is killing the cause of the problem. In contrast of it, his demeanor is usually calm and stoic, but he has a short temper and is intolerant towards anything he perceives as weakness, believing only the strong have a right to live. For all of his flaws, Akutagwa can be very considerate to the people who have his approval, having a good relationship with his younger sister Gin, and often spending their shared day-offs with her. Due to growing up in the slums and his lung disease, he is often very sickly and has a persistent cough, which in turn makes him strive for Dazai's approval before his time comes, as he has a deep respect for the man ever since Dazai gave him a job at the Mafia.

=== Chūya Nakahara ===
Chuuya Nakahara (中原 中也, Nakahara Chūya)
Voiced by: Kishō Taniyama (Japanese); Nicolas Roye (English)
Named after Chūya Nakahara. He is a 22 year old executive member of the Port Mafia and Dazai's former partner as Double Black (双黒, Soukoku). His ability, Upon the Tainted Sorrow (汚れっちまった悲しみに, Yogorecchimatta Kanashimi ni), allows him to manipulate the gravity of objects as long as he is in contact with them, including himself. He is rather short (160 cm) and dislikes being reminded of it, especially by Dazai. Although rather hot-headed and ruthless, Chūya is generally a reasonable person, if no one tries to push his buttons, more so if Dazai is not present. He is regarded as one of the strongest ability users in Yokohama, being the vessel of the sentinent Ability singularity, the God of Calamity Arahabaki, a secret military experiment to create an artificial Ability, that broke out of confinement and sealed itself into Chūya's body. He can call upon its power using a technique called Corruption, during which Arahabaki takes over his consciousness, which, while driving his Ability overdrive and thus granting him even more power to the point of being able to form miniature black holes, turns him into a mindless beast that has no concept of anything besides itself, with the only goal of destroying everything in sight until its body gives out. The only known way to stop Corruption is Dazai's Ability, which is why he was partnered up with Dazai. He appreciates wine, and heavily dislikes Dazai. Despite that, Chūya does care about Dazai's safety on some level, though he claims only because he is the only one who has the right of killing Dazai, as Chūya put up with the former for years.

== Armed Detective Agency ==
The Armed Detective Agency (武装探偵社, Busō Tantei-sha) are the main protagonists of the series. They are an ability user organization focused on solving crimes considered too violent or difficult for the metropolitan police to handle, often involving ability users or the supernatural. They are highly connected in the network of government agencies and military personnel, handling a large amount of classified work. The agency's licensed staff are granted police-like authority.

Frontline guard members: Atsushi Nakajima, and Osamu Dazai.

=== Doppo Kunikida ===
Doppo Kunikida (国木田 独歩, Kunikida Doppo)
Voiced by: Yoshimasa Hosoya (Japanese); Patrick Seitz (English)
Named after Doppo Kunikida. Known for his meticulous planning, organization, perfectionistic tendencies, and extreme fixation on his ideals. Due to this, he is easily riled by Dazai's pranks, which he falls victim to quite often as he is Dazai's assigned partner. He often writes and makes plans in his signature notebook, which has "Ideals (理想, Risou)" written on the front cover. The notebook is linked to his ability, The Matchless Poet (独歩吟客, Doppo Ginkaku). His ability allows him to materialize objects by writing them in his notebook, ripping out the page, and willing them into existence, as long as the object is not larger than the notebook itself. He can produce an exact replica of an object simply by looking at it as long as he understands its mechanism and proper usage. He can utilize pre-torn pages from his notebook and notes that he has prewritten. He can remotely materialize items from a large distance, allowing him to help fellow Agency members from afar. His ability, as well as anything he materializes, can be nullified by Dazai, and the object will be reverted into paper.

=== Ranpo Edogawa ===
Ranpo Edogawa (江戸川 乱歩, Edogawa Ranpo)
Voiced by: Hiroshi Kamiya (Japanese); Vic Mignogna (seasons 1-2), Landon McDonald (season 3; Dead Apple) (English)
Named after Ranpo Edogawa. A detective regarded by many as the "greatest detective in the world" (世界最高の名探偵 sekai saikō no mei tantei), he is highly sought after by the police and helps solve cases both related and unrelated to the Agency, with a reputation for never solving a case incorrectly. Despite being one of the oldest members of the Agency and held in high esteem by many, he adopts a childish demeanor and lacks basic everyday skills (such as riding the train). However, he has been shown to be serious when the situation calls for it. He is the only Agency member without a true ability, rather, he possesses prodigious observational and deduction skills, which is referred to as the Ability, Super Deduction (超推理, Chō Suiri). Ranpo does not like to acknowledge that he does not actually possess an Ability and convinced himself that he needs the glasses given to him by Fukuzawa to activate Super Deduction.

=== Jun'ichirō Tanizaki ===
Jun'ichirō Tanizaki (谷崎 潤一郎, Tanizaki Jun'ichirō)
Voiced by: Toshiyuki Toyonaga (Japanese); Spike Spencer (English)
Named after Jun'ichirō Tanizaki. An 18-year-old assistant at the Agency who mainly focuses on gathering information as his ability, Light Snow (細雪, Sasameyuki), allows him to project illusions within a certain area, which is not suited for combat. He cohabits with his younger sister Naomi and treasures her dearly, despite finding some of her antics annoying.

=== Kenji Miyazawa ===
Kenji Miyazawa (宮沢 賢治, Miyazawa Kenji)
Voiced by: Hiroyuki Kagura (Japanese); Lucien Dodge (English)
Named after Kenji Miyazawa. A 14-year-old optimistic and carefree boy hailing from the countryside, he is extremely popular among Yokohama residents due to his honesty and cheerful attitude. This makes him the Agency's primary data collector from eyewitnesses. His ability is called Undefeated by the Rain (雨ニモマケズ, Ame ni mo Makezu), which grants him superhuman strength when he is hungry.

=== Akiko Yosano ===
Akiko Yosano (与謝野 晶子, Yosano Akiko)
Voiced by: Yū Shimamura (Japanese); Erica Lindbeck (English)
Named after Akiko Yosano. She is the medic of the Agency, feared for her torturous treatments. While her ability Thou Shall Not Die (君死にたもうこと勿れ, Kimi Shinitamou Koto Nakare) allows her to heal any wound, as long as the patient is on the verge of death; this often results in her injuring her patients thoroughly before healing them. In her past, she was a nurse in a war and used her ability to heal the soldiers. All the soldiers called her their angel. But they eventually got exhausted with repeatedly dying and being brought back by her just for them to die again to the point that one of her friends among the soldiers attempted to kill her. That is how she got the name "Angel of Death".

=== Yukichi Fukuzawa ===
Yukichi Fukuzawa (福沢 諭吉, Fukuzawa Yukichi)
Voiced by: Rikiya Koyama (Japanese); Jamieson Price (English)
Named after Yukichi Fukuzawa. He is the President of the Armed Detective Agency, as well as Kunikida's mentor. His ability, All Men Are Equal (人上人不造, Hito no Ue ni Hito o Tsukurazu), allows him to control and restrict the abilities of his subordinates. This ability is especially useful for those who lack control over their abilities, like Atsushi and Kyōka. Fukuzawa is a former government assansin, having been the bodyguard of Mori Ougai, the current Port Mafia boss back when the latter was a freelance underground doctor. After meeting Edogawa Ranpo, he founded the Armed Detective Agency for the sole reason to give Ranpo somehwere to belong to. Fukuzawa is also childhood friends with the commander of the Special Military Police Unit, the Hunting Dogs, Fukuchi Ouchi. Fukuzawa is a stoic and imposing man who is practically never seen smiling, and has an unmatched proficency of swordsmanship, being able to square off against powerful Ability users on pure skill alone. Despite his cold exterior, he is very fond of children and cats.

=== Kyōka Izumi ===
Kyōka Izumi (泉 鏡花, Izumi Kyōka)
Voiced by: Sumire Morohoshi (Japanese); Cherami Leigh (English)
Named after Kyōka Izumi. A 14-year-old orphan girl who was taken in by the Port Mafia and became their youngest assassin. Her ability, Demon Snow (夜叉白雪, Yasha Shirayuki), materializes Demon Snow, a ruthless sword-wielding phantom that only follows orders coming from her mobile phone, which allowed Akutagawa to control her ability in the past. Her parents used to be assassins as well until an enemy attempted to use a body manipulation ability on them. Kyōka's mother, who at that time owned Demon Snow, killed her husband and subsequently herself as she was gradually succumbing to the ability, her last words ordering the phantom to protect her daughter and passing on this ability. However, this technique was incomplete, resulting in Demon Snow only listening to orders from the phone.

=== Kirako Haruno ===
Kirako Haruno (春野 綺羅子, Haruno Kirako)
Voiced by: Mina (Japanese); Abby Trott (English)
Named after a character from Jun'ichirō Tanizaki's novel Naomi (痴人の愛, Chijin no Ai, lit. A Fool's Love). A clerk working at the Armed Detective Agency. She has a cat named Mii-chan, who turns out to be Sōseki Natsume in cat form.

=== Naomi Tanizaki ===
Naomi Tanizaki (谷崎 ナオミ, Tanizaki Naomi)
Voiced by: Chiaki Omigawa (Japanese); Erica Lindbeck (English)
Named after the main character from Jun'ichirō Tanizaki's novel Naomi. Jun'ichirō's sister and a high school student who has a brother complex and frequently likes to tease him. Although she can be tiresome to her brother at times, she is a capable young woman. She only works part time at the agency, due to her young age.

=== Katai Tayama ===
Katai Tayama (田山 花袋, Tayama Katai)
Voiced by: Kenichi Suzumura (Japanese); Steve Staley (English)
Named after Katai Tayama. He is an information broker for the Agency with the ability Futon (蒲団, also translated "The Quilt") which allows him to control electronics within his sight as long as he is not touching them. He is good friends with Kunikida, having known him for ten years. He is easily stressed out and often unmotivated, which can complicate plans for the Agency. He is considered a hikikomori.

== Port Mafia ==
The Port Mafia (ポートマフィア, Pōto Mafia) are the main antagonists of the series. They are an underground criminal organization. Also known as Yokohama's "Night Wardens", the Mafia places a great importance on protecting Yokohama from external organizations to sustain themselves. They have a "skilled business permit", allowing them to conduct many of their criminal activities legally, including giving their Ability users the clearance to freely use their powers without restriction. They have dozens of enterprises within their control, exceeding politics and economics, and its influence can be found in numerous places around Yokohama. The brains of the criminal underworld market, they specialize in assaults, assassination, and black market trade, including but not necessarily limited to, weaponry, illegal products, and people. They have many international connections with other criminal organizations.

Frontline guard members: Ryūnosuke Akutagawa, and Chūya Nakahara.

=== Ichiyō Higuchi ===
Ichiyō Higuchi (樋口 一葉, Higuchi Ichiyō)
Voiced by: Asami Seto (Japanese); Carrie Keranen (English)
Named after Ichiyō Higuchi. She is a member of the Port Mafia and a subordinate of Akutagawa, whom she greatly admires to the point of obsession. She often fantasizes about being helpful to Akutagwa while blushing, and flings into near-murderous jealousy when she suspects he has a relationship with a woman (who later turns out of the Akutagawa's sister). Although the nature of her ability is yet to be confirmed, she is shown to be physically capable and possesses formidable fighting skills. She is very skilled with firearms and prefers to wield a set of double pistols.

=== Motojirō Kajii ===
Motojirō Kajii (梶井 基次郎, Kajii Motojirō)
Voiced by: Wataru Hatano (Japanese); Brian Palermo (English)
Named after Motojirō Kajii. A 28-year-old member of the Port Mafia and an infamous serial bomber. His ability, Lemonade (檸檬爆弾, Remonēdo), prevents him from being harmed by lemon-shaped bombs he makes himself. Extremely eccentric, easily excitable, and driven by the ambition to make scientific discoveries, he views the concept of death as his "greatest experiment," fascinated with it and calling it the "apex of science". He also seems to be quite nihilistic, saying that joy and hope are just signals created by the brain, and that science is the thing closest to something true in the world, and that one only can understand the world by science.

=== Ryūrō Hirotsu ===
Ryūrō Hirotsu (広津 柳浪, Hirotsu Ryūrō)
Voiced by: Atsushi Ono (Japanese); Greg Chun (English)
Named after Ryūrō Hirotsu. A sharply dressed man, he is the commander of the Black Lizard (黒蜥蜴, Kuro Tokage), the mafia's squad of hitmen. His ability, Falling Camellia (落椿, Ochitsubaki), sends objects flying with a powerful force. He is diligent in his work and dislikes unprofessional behavior.

=== Michizō Tachihara ===
Michizō Tachihara (立原 道造, Tachihara Michizō)
Voiced by: Yū Hayashi (Japanese); Ben Diskin (seasons 1-3), A.J. Beckles (seasons 4-5) (English)
Named after Michizō Tachihara. A cold leader of the Black Lizard battalion, he is never seen without his dual guns. Later on, he is revealed to be the fifth member of the Hunting Dogs, a special ability group tasked by the government to catch dangerous gifted. His ability, Midwinter Memento (真冬のかたみ, Mafuyu no Katami), grants him ferrokinesis, the ability to manipulate metal, allowing him to remotely control metal objects with great proficiency. He has been described by Teruko as "born to be a spy". Tachihara later defects from the Hunting Dogs and decides to become a true member of the Port Mafia, being inspired by the friends he made there.

=== Gin Akutagawa ===
Gin Akutagawa (芥川 銀)
Voiced by: Shiina Natsukawa (Japanese); Allegra Clark (English)
Named in reference to Ryūnosuke Akutagawa's short story O-Gin. A very silent and stealthy commander of the Black Lizard group. Initially assumed male, Dazai reveals she is actually Ryūnosuke Akutagawa's younger sister. She is very professional and focused in work, but she's easily embarrassed by Dazai's commetns or one of her collegaues seeing her without the face-mask she wears for work. Despite not having an ability, she fights fiercely with her knife as an assassin. The cross on her choker may be an allusion to the theme of Christianity in O-Gin.

=== Ōgai Mori ===
Ōgai Mori (森 鴎外, Mori Ōgai)
Voiced by: Mitsuru Miyamoto (Japanese); Keith Silverstein (English)
Named after Ōgai Mori. The leader of Port Mafia, and secondary antagonist/occasional ally of the series. Despite being a mafia boss, he acts like a gentleman, being polite to allies and enemies alike. Mori often puts of the front of a whimsy, somewhat forgetful and clumsy ex-surgeon when blending among people. He is also noted to have immense amount of bloodthirst, to the point he can physically paralyze other people just by exterting his killing intent, which, according to Fukuzawa, is so palpable one can smell it from across a room. As a former doctor, he can be very dangerous in a fight, and is ruthlessly pragmatic and mathematical in his reasoning, frequently quoting logicians and statisticians. His ability, Vita Sexualis (ヰタ・セクスアリス, Wita Sekusuarisu), allows him to summon Elise, and configure her actions, appearance and mood, enabling her to act as a distraction, fight alongside him, or protect him from harm.

=== Elise ===
Elise (エリス, Erisu)
Voiced by: Sora Amamiya (Japanese); Carrie Keranen (English)
Named after the main character in The Dancing Girl (舞姫, Maihime). Elise is a young girl with blonde hair and blue eyes under the care of Ōgai Mori, whom she calls "Rintarō" as a reference to the author Ōgai Mori's birthname, Rintarō Mori. As a manifestation of Mori's ability, her existence as a human is unclear, though she considers the mafia to be her family, and Mori refers to him as his wife. Many people dislike Mori for this reason, considering the fact that Elise looks like she's 10 years old. Elise acts like a typical child, being bossy, whimsical, and throwing a tantrum if she doesn't like something. She often pesters Mori for sweets to which he always indulges. Despite her apparent dislike for Mori, she seems to be fond of him deep down, even though she doesn't like the fact Mori can have her bail him out of trouble whenever he wants to.

=== Kōyō Ozaki ===
Kōyō Ozaki (尾崎 紅葉, Ozaki Kōyō)
Voiced by: Ami Koshimizu (Japanese); Cindy Robinson (English)
Named after Kōyō Ozaki. She is a Port Mafia executive with the ability Golden Demon (金色夜叉, Konjaki Yasha), capable of conjuring a sword-wielding spirit like Kyōka's and commanding it at will. She cares deeply for Kyōka and wants her to have the happiness that she never got, although she frequently manipulates Kyōka into following her orders. When she was 19, Mori assigned her to be Chūya's caretaker, prompting Chūya to refer to her as "Big Sis." Although she holds herself with great dignity and grace, she does not hide her dark nature/abrasive side.

=== Sakunosuke Oda ===
Sakunosuke Oda (織田 作之助, Oda Sakunosuke)
Voiced by: Junichi Suwabe, Yūto Uemura (young) (Japanese); David Vincent (English)
Named after Sakunosuke Oda. A low-ranking member of Port Mafia and a friend of Dazai and Ango. His ability, Flawless (天衣無縫, Ten'imuhō), allows Oda to see 5-6 seconds into the future. He was a strong combatant, but his refusal to kill kept him from ascending to a rank befit for his capabilities. His name is often shortened as "Odasaku (織田作, Odasaku)" by Dazai. He wanted to eventually retire from the mafia and be a writer, until the leader of the organization Mimic, André Gide, kills the children Oda catered for to provoke him into breaking his principle to not kill and face Gide in a duel to death, during which they mutually kill each other. The dying Oda is found by Dazai, and his last words motivated the latter to leave the Mafia and eventually join the Armed Detective Agency.

=== Kyūsaku Yumeno ===
Kyūsaku Yumeno (夢野 久作, Yumeno Kyūsaku)
Voiced by: Haruka Kudō (Japanese); Tara Sands (English)
Named after Kyūsaku Yumeno. They are also known as "Q." Their ability, Dogra Magra (ドグラ・マグラ, Dogura Magura) is a mind control curse. If someone has harmed them, either intentionally or unintentionally, they will fall under the curse when Yumeno splits open the doll they always carry with them. The curse itself makes people see illusions that turn them hostile, usually forcing them to attack friends and foes recklessly. After an incident where they used their curse on members of the Port Mafia, they were considered too dangerous and imprisoned by Dazai and Chūya. While in the manga and tv series, they are referred to with the pronouns "He/Him," the manga series "Bungo Stray Dogs Wan!" has since confirmed that they are either non-binary or genderfluid.

=== Ace ===
Ace (エース, Ēsu)
Voiced by: Daisuke Ono (Japanese); Robbie Daymond (English)
Named after Alan Bennett (his name and ability name were changed to avoid copyright issues). Also known as "A", he was a Port Mafia executive who captured Fyodor Dostoyevsky. His ability, The Madness of the Jewel King (宝石王の乱心, Hōseki-ō no Ranshin), based on The Madness of George III, allowed him to turn his subordinates' lives into jewels (provided they wore a collar Ace gave them), their worth depending on the target's lifespan. He was outwitted into committing suicide by Fyodor, after planning to betray the Port Mafia.

=== Karma ===
Karma (カルマ, Karuma)
Voiced by: Miyu Irino (Japanese); Bryce Papenbrook (English)
A young member of the Port Mafia and Ace's subordinate, he was consensually killed by Fyodor in his escape. He was not shown to have possessed an ability.

=== Paul Verlaine ===
Paul Verlaine (ポール・ヴェルレーヌ, Pōru Verurēnu)
Named after Paul Verlaine. Verlaine is the product of a human experiment to create an Ability-using super soldier, being referred to as Black No.12. His creator, a rebel leader known as Pan was eventually killed by a french spy, Palul Verlaine, who took him under his wing and gave Black No.12 his own birth name, taking up the alias of Arthur Rimbaud. Verlaine became a successful government assansin, eventually gaining reputation as the King of Assansins. When during the end of the Great War, he and Rimbaud had arrived to Yokohama and found a research facility which tried to recreate Pan's work, Verlaine and Rimbaud got into and argument over what to do with the test subject, a young Chūya, which culminated in Verlaine betraying Rimbaud, with the singulatiry in Chūya breaking out during their fight and causing a great explosion, whic separated them. Believeing to have killed his best friend, Verlaine's mental health rapidly deteriorated for years, during which he became obsessed with Chūya, believeing the boy was the only one who could understand him because of their similar lives. After being defeated by Chūya in a fight between himself and the Port Mafia, Verlaine allowed himself to be detained, and eventually joined the Mafia as one of the five executives. Nowadays, he spends his days in the Mafia headquarters' basement, wrting letters to the late Rimbaud and training young assansins of the mafia, such as Gin. Verlaine eventually have developed an amicable relationship with Chūya, to whom he refers as his little brother. He possesses an unnamed Ability which is similar to Chūya's Upon the Tainted Sorrow, allowing him to change the gravtiy of himself and anything he touches. He also possesses a sentinent singularity similar to Arahabaki, known as the Demonic Beast Guivre (魔獣ギーヴル, Majū Gīvuru), which he can call upon using a method called Brutalization.

== The Guild ==
The Guild (組合, Girudo; sometimes also written as ギルド or ぎるど) is a secret society of ability users from North America (primarily the United States). They have international influence, are granted diplomatic authority, and have extraterritorial rights (meaning Japanese law enforcement cannot detain them). Most of them possess a significant amount of money.

=== Francis Scott Key Fitzgerald ===
Francis Scott Key Fitzgerald (フランシス・スコット・キー・フィッツジェラルド, Furanshisu Sukotto Kī Fittsujerarudo)
Voiced by: Takahiro Sakurai (Japanese); Chris Hackney (English)
Named after F. Scott Fitzgerald. He is the leader of the "Fellowship of The Guild". His ability, The Great Fitzgerald (華麗なるフィッツジェラルド, Kareinaru Fittsujerarudo), based on The Great Gatsby, grants him an increase in strength at the expense of his money. Simply throwing currency off a balcony, for example, can trigger his power. His goal is eventually revealed to be the retrieval of "The Book", to revive his dead daughter. After his defeat to Akutagawa and Atsushi, he rebuilds his organization from the ground up with the help of Louisa May Alcott.

=== Lucy Maud Montgomery ===
Lucy Maud Montgomery (ルーシー・モード・モンゴメリ, Rūshī Mōdo Mongomeri)
Voiced by: Kana Hanazawa (Japanese); Cristina Vee (English)
Named after Lucy Maud Montgomery. A member of The Guild and Fitzgerald's subordinate. An orphan who suffered trauma from her caretakers like Atsushi, although she never recovered like he did. This resulted in Lucy developing a snobby and "tomboyish" personality, while also developing a dependency on The Guild as she believes no one else is willing to accept her. Her ability, Anne of Abyssal Red (深淵の赤毛のアン, Shin'en no Akage no An), based on Anne of Green Gables, allows her to create an alternate reality known as "Anne's Room", in which people are imprisoned if they get caught by a giant doll named Anne while playing tag. When the Guild collapses, she gets a job in the cafe below the agency, and eventually becomes their ally.

=== Margaret Mitchell ===
Margaret Mitchell (マーガレット・ミッチェル, Māgaretto Mitcheru)
Voiced by: Kaori Nazuka (Japanese); Colleen O'Shaughnessey (English)
Named after Margaret Mitchell. A member of The Guild, partnered with Nathaniel Hawthorne. Margaret's temperament can only be described as arrogant, prone to looking down on anyone around her be they friend or foe. Her ability, Gone with the Wind (風と共に去りぬ, Kaze to Tomo ni Sarinu), allows her to weather away any object caught in the wind, reducing it to dust. She is visually portrayed as an American Southern belle.

=== Nathaniel Hawthorne ===
Nathaniel Hawthorne (ナサニエル・ホーソーン, Nasanieru Hōsōn)
Voiced by: Tarusuke Shingaki (Japanese); Matthew Mercer (English)
Named after Nathaniel Hawthorne. A member of The Guild, partnered with Margaret Mitchell. A man of God who always carries a Bible with him, Nathaniel believes that it is his duty to punish the sinners of the world. As a result, he often comes off as arrogant when he "judges" people and is prone to getting into quarrels with Margaret. His ability, The Scarlet Letter (緋文字, Himonji), allows him to convert his own blood into holy words, with offensive and defensive applications. He makes a deal with Fyodor after the fall of The Guild and serves him in a disturbed cognitive state.

=== John Steinbeck ===
John Steinbeck (ジョン・スタインベック, Jon Sutainbekku)
Voiced by: Kengo Kawanishi (Japanese); Kyle McCarley (English)
Named after John Steinbeck. A member of The Guild and partner to H.P. Lovecraft. Steinbeck hails from a large family of farmers from North America and joined the Guild in an effort to support them financially. Steinbeck's relaxed and friendly personality hides a fierce sadistic streak. His ability, The Grapes of Wrath (怒りの葡萄, Ikari no Budō) allows him to sprout grapevines from his neck which he can graft to other plants. Any plant with a grafted grape branch can be freely controlled by Steinbeck as a part of his own body. He actually despises Fitzgerald, seeing his view on people and money as disgusting and cruel. After The Guild collapses, he becomes the leader of The Guild remnants, and resolves to crush Fitzgerald's new ventures.

=== Howard Phillips Lovecraft ===
Howard Phillips Lovecraft (ハワード・フィリップス・ラヴクラフト, Hawādo Firippusu Ravukurafuto)
Voiced by: Shunsuke Takeuchi (Japanese); Mick Wingert (English)
Named after H. P. Lovecraft. A member of The Guild and partner to John Steinbeck. An eccentric, pessimistic, and often anxious man in his late twenties, Lovecraft is prone to be distracted by the most unusual things, such as wood grains. While never outright stated in the series, Lovecraft hints that his "ability," The Great Old Ones (旧支配者, Kyū Shihai-sha), is not an actual ability, as Dazai is unable to nullify it. When fully activated, The Great Old Ones turns Lovecraft into a powerful tentacled eldritch monster that can only be damaged from the inside. He also is able to transform only certain parts of his body into tentacles, similar to Atsushi's ability to transform parts of his body into a tiger. After the defeat of Fitzgerald, Lovecraft claims his contract has become null, and bizarrely walks into the ocean, claiming to be "going to sleep."

=== Mark Twain ===
Mark Twain (マーク・トウェイン, Māku Tōein)
Voiced by: Hiroyuki Yoshino (Japanese); Phillip Reich (English)
Named after Mark Twain. A member of The Guild. His ability, Huckleberry Finn & Tom Sawyer (ハック・フィン&トム・ソーヤ, Hakku Fin & Tomu Sōya) an ability that takes the forms of the dolls known as Huck Finn (ハック・フィン, Hakku Fin) and Tom Sawyer (トム・ソーヤ, Tomu Sōya). He serves as a sniper, and with the assistance of Huck and Tom, his aim is excellent.

Huck Finn (ハック・フィン, Hakku Fin)

Voiced by: Risae Matsuda (Japanese); Abby Trott (English)
Named after Twain's character Huckleberry Finn. Part of Mark's ability.

Tom Sawyer (トム・ソーヤ, Tomu Sōya)

Voiced by: Satsumi Matsuda (Japanese); Colleen O'Shaughnessey (English)
Named after Twain's character Tom Sawyer. Part of Mark's ability.

=== Louisa May Alcott ===
Louisa May Alcott (ルイーザ・メイ・オルコット, Ruīza Mei Orukotto)
Voiced by: Hikaru Ueda (Japanese); Erica Mendez (English)
Named after Louisa May Alcott. A member of The Guild and their main tactician. Her ability, Little Women (若草物語, Wakakusa Monogatari; lit. Story of Young Grass), allows her to slow time down to 1/8000th of regular speed when she is thinking in a private room. Her shy demeanor makes her work as a strategist. She has never used her ability for herself, and is completely devoted to Fitzgerald, helping him get back on his feet after The Guild's downfall.

=== Herman Melville ===
Herman Melville (ハーマン・メルビル, Hāman Merubiru)
Voiced by: Takayuki Sugō (Japanese); John DeMita (English)
Named after Herman Melville. An elder member and former leader of The Guild whose ability, Moby Dick (モビー・ディック, Mobī Dikku), also known as White Whale (白鯨, Hakugei), takes the form of a gigantic white whale. Over the years, the whale has been transformed into a mechanical airship, to serve the Guild.

=== Edgar Allan Poe ===
Edgar Allan Poe (エドガー・アラン・ポオ, Edogā Aran Pō)
Voiced by: Toshiyuki Morikawa (Japanese); Todd Haberkorn (English)
Named after Edgar Allan Poe. The former master architect of The Guild and a detective from America. He has extreme social anxiety, but he is very determined and often obsessive. He is driven by his desire to "beat" Ranpo after suffering a loss in an investigation competition six years before the events of the series, devoting all his time to creating mysteries in the hope of stumping Ranpo and winning back his dignity. His ability, Black Cat in the Rue Morgue (モルグ街の黒猫, Morugugai no Kuroneko), allows Poe to transport readers into the setting of any novel that they are currently reading. He can often be seen blushing and stuttering whenever in Ranpos presence.

=== Karl ===
Karl (カール, Kāru)
Voiced by: Ayaka Nanase (Japanese); Benjamin Diskin (English)
The pet raccoon of Edgar Allan Poe. He is very affectionate and often playful.

== Rats in the House of the Dead ==
The Rats in the House of the Dead (死の家の鼠, Shi no Ie no Nezumi) are an underground terrorist organization, with the goal of obtaining the Book.

=== Fyodor Dostoevsky ===
Fyodor Dostoevsky (フョードル・ドストエフスキー, Fuyōdoru Dosutoefusukī)
Voiced by: Akira Ishida (Japanese); Ray Chase (English)
Named after Fyodor Dostoevsky. He is the main antagonist of Bungo Stray Dogs. The leader of the Rats in the House of the Dead, his ability, Crime and Punishment (罪と罰, Tsumi to Batsu), allows him to steal the body of the person who kills him. He is also a member of the "Decay of Angels" group, under Kamui's leadership. His intelligence can be easily compared to other characters, such as Ranpo and Dazai. He is also confirmed to have both dermatophagia (the habit of biting your fingers excessively) and anemia (a blood disorder wherein the blood's ability to carry oxygen is reduced).
Crime and Punishment is named after the book of the same name written by his author counterpart. It portrays the story of Rodion Raskolnikov, a destitute student who commits murder and attempts to justify his crimes are for the greater good, only to be chased by the repercussions of his actions. The book itself is very famous and is widely regarded as Dostoevsky’s masterpiece.

=== Alexander Pushkin ===
Alexander Pushkin (アレクサンダー・プシュキン, Arekusandā Pushukin)
Voiced by: Daisuke Kirī (Japanese); Kyle Hebert (English)
Named after Alexander Pushkin. He is a member of the Rats in the House of the Dead. His ability, A Feast in Time of Plague (黒死病の時代の饗宴, Kokushibyō no Jidai no Kyōen), allows Pushkin to infect two given people with a special virus. The two infected are guaranteed to die, unless one of them is killed, which will end the other's illness.

=== Ivan Goncharov ===
Ivan Goncharov (イバン・ゴンチャロフ, Iban Goncharofu)
Voiced by: Kōsuke Toriumi (Japanese); Erik Kimerer (English)
Named after Ivan Goncharov. He is a member of the Rats in the House of the Dead. His ability, The Precipice (断崖, Dangai), grants him control over geological constructs.

=== Mushitarō Oguri ===
Mushitarō Oguri (小栗 虫太郎, Oguri Mushitarō)
Voiced by: Takeshi Kusao (Japanese), Mick Lauer (English)
Named after Mushitarō Oguri. He is a member of the Rats in the House of the Dead. His ability, Perfect Crime (完全犯罪, Kanzen Hanzai), allows him to erase all evidence of a given crime.

== The Decay of the Angel ==
The Decay of the Angel (天人五衰, Tennin Gosui) is a terrorist organization specializing as a murder association, devoted to the destruction of all nations.

=== Nikolai Gogol ===
Nikolai Gogol (ニコライ・ゴーゴリ, Nikorai Gōgori)
Voiced by: Takehito Koyasu (Japanese); Jeff Schine (English)
Named after Nikolai Gogol. While presenting himself as a sadistic individual with absolutely no remsorse or conscience who only kills for the hell of it, Gogol claims to be actually a sane person who understands that killing is evil and feels remorse like everyone else. Gogol has a great focus on the concept of freedom, claiming he wants to be free like a bird and fly. He views societal norms, morals, and even human feelings as forms of restrains that hold him back from being free, and is dedicated to act exactly opposite to what would be expected in an effort to be free of them all. For his goal, Gogol would even go as far as trying to kill Dostoevksy, whom he claims to be his greatest friend and the only person to ever have understood him, seeing his friendship as another thing keeping him from freedom. His ability, The Overcoat (外套, Gaitō), grants him the power to use his coat as a medium to create portals by connecting two points of space. The Overcoat also works as a pocket dimension, being able to store things such as guns knives, and even telephone poles which Gogol uses as a weapon.

=== Sigma ===
Sigma (シグマ, Shiguma),
Voiced by: Shōya Chiba (Japanese), Cory Yee (English)
The general manager of the Sky Casino. While his ability has yet to be named, it is an information transfer ability that allows anybody in physical contact with Sigma to gain the information they most want to know in exchange for him learning what he most wants to know from them. Fyodor notes that Sigma's potential comes from the fact that he is a 'desperate man' who will do anything to protect the 'home' he finds in the casino. Atsushi believes that Sigma possesses a page of the supernatural Book that the Decay of Angels used to frame the Detective Agency for a murder case. Actually, Sigma is desperate to protect the place he belongs to because he has no identity or memories, as he was created by the Book three years prior, with his first memory being waking up in a desert with nothing but a train ticket to a station that doesn't exist. After that, Sigma was captured by trafickers who used his Ability to extract crucial information, until he met Fyodor, who offered him a home where he can belong to.

=== Bram Stoker ===
Bram Stoker (ブラム・ストーカ, Buramu Sutōkā)
Voiced by: Kenjiro Tsuda
Named after Bram Stoker. In the past, Bram was an earl in Northern Europe. Despite formerly being a human, his cells had been mutated due to his ability, which then resulted in him being transformed into a vampiric being, gaining great power, agelessness, and powerful regeneration. Bram's ability, Draculea (吸血種, Kyūketsu-shu) is an infection-type ability which turns whoever he bites into a vampire whom he can command, and who also can spread the infection by biting others. His Ability is so powerful that Bram himself estimates it could cover half the planet in four days, which resulted in him being labelled as one of the Top Ten Calamities to Destroy The World. In the past he was defeated by Fukuchi, who secretly kept him after dismembering him and sealing his regeneration by impaling the Holy Sword Soluz Levni into his brain. Later, Fukuchi controls Bram through Soluz Levni to trigger a global vampire infection with his Ability. During the raid of the airport, a young girl named Aya stumbles upon Bram and takes him to help preventing Fukuchi's plan, to which Bram eventually agrees to cooperate in exchange for a wireless radio he can listen to while in his coffin, and because she reminds Bram to his own daughter who was killed by a mob hunting for him because he was a vampire. They eventually get captured by the vampirised Akutagwa, but Aya manages to free Bram from Soluz Levni, which results in him regaining his body and stopping the vampires' attack. Bram also has one of his vampire servants kill Dostoevsky, but that unknowingly triggers Dostoevksy's Ability, resulting in the latter taking over Bram's body, killing him in the process. Later, Bram reappears for a short time by possessing Akutagawa to save Aya and thank her for their time together. Despite his dangerous Ability, Bram is a peaceful person who has no desire besides sleeping in his coffin forever, and when he was labelled a calamity, he became so depressed he swore off creating more vampires for the rest of his life,

== Hunting Dogs ==
The Hunting Dogs (猟犬, Ryōken) are a military organization working for the government. They are a Grade-A squad built for special tactics and suppression duty, and the strongest military unit in the military police.

=== Ōchi Fukuchi ===
Ōchi Fukuchi (福地 桜痴, Fukuchi Ōchi)
Voiced by: Akio Otsuka (Japanese); David Vincent (English)
Named after Ōchi Fukuchi. The commander of the Hunting Dogs special units. However, in reality, he is the leader of the terrorist organization, the Decay of Angels, acting under the alias of Kamui. His ability, Mirror Lion (鏡獅子, Kagami Jishi), allows him to strengthen the power of any weapon he holds by a hundred-fold.

=== Saigiku Jōno ===
Saigiku Jōno (條野 採菊, Jōno Saigiku)
Voiced by: Yuki Kaji (Japanese); Adam McArthur (English)
Named after Saigiku Jōno. He is a member of the Hunting Dogs special unit. His ability, Priceless Tears (千金の涙, Senkin no Namida), allows him to disintegrate his body into atoms and then manipulate them.

=== Teruko Ōkura ===
Teruko Ōkura (大倉燁子, Ōkura Teruko)
Voiced by: Makoto Koichi (Japanese); Cherami Leigh (English)
Named after Teruko Ōkura. The vice-commander of the Hunting Dogs special unit. Her ability, Gasp of the Soul (魂の喘ぎ, Tamashī no Aegi), allows her to manipulate the age of anyone she touches, as well as her own.

=== Tetchō Suehiro ===
Tetchō Suehiro (末広 鐵腸, Suehiro Tetchō)
Voiced by: Yōhei Azakami (Japanese); Griffin Puatu (English)
Named after Tetchō Suehiro. He is a member of the Hunting Dogs special unit. His ability, Plum Blossoms in Snow (雪中梅, Setchūbai), allows him to increase properties of his sword, namely the size, shape, and length of it.

== Other characters (main storyline) ==
=== Ango Sakaguchi ===
Ango Sakaguchi (坂口 安吾, Sakaguchi Ango)
Voiced by: Jun Fukuyama (Japanese); Michael Yurchak (English)
Named after Ango Sakaguchi. A government worker and the former Port Mafia's Intelligence Agent, but it was under the Government's orders to spy on the mafia's activities. During his time working as an intelligence agent under for the Port Mafia, he also became an agent for Mimic under Ōgai Mori's orders. His ability, Discourse on Decadence (堕落論, Darakuron), allows him to read the memories of any object he touches.

=== Santōka Taneda ===
Santōka Taneda (種田 山頭火, Taneda Santōka)
Voiced by: Fumihiko Tachiki (Japanese); John DeMita (English)
Named after Santōka Taneda. He is the director of the Special Ability Department. Not much is known about his past, though it is hinted that he helped on the creation of the Armed Detective Agency and was also the one who helped Osamu Dazai to find a job in the Agency after he left the Port Mafia. His ability, Hail in the Begging Bowl (鉄鉢の中へも霰, Teppatsu no Naka he mo Arare), allows him to immediately know the ability (and nature of said ability) of any ability user if their ability is activated near him.

=== André Gide ===
André Gide (アンドレ・ジッド, Andore Jiddo)
Voiced by: Shinichiro Miki (Japanese); Kirk Thornton (English)
Named after André Gide. He was the leader of a criminal military organization from Europe known as Mimic. During the Great War, the unit who latter would become Mimic were tasked with conquering a city, which they did, unaware that a treaty was made while they fought. Thus, they were branded as war criminals and their government cut all ties with them. With the lead of Gide, Mimic went into hiding and used the uniforms of their enemies to evade detection, which became their namesake. As a soldier who was betrayed by his homeland, Gide's only desire is to have a glorious death against a worthy opponent, finding no meaning in living further, but his pride as a soldier not letting him turn his weapon on himself. He eventually encounters Oda Sakunosuke, who proves to be a match for him, but refuses to kill. To provoke him into a deathmatch, Gide has the orphans Oda catered for killed, after which Oda meets him at the headquarters of Mimic, killing all the members, and facing Gide in a duel, during which they mutually kill each other, and Gide dies with a smile on his face. Gide's Ability Strait is the Gate (狭き門, Semakimon) allows him to see roughly 5 to 6 seconds into the future, not unlike Oda's Flawless.

=== Aya Kōda ===
Aya Kōda (幸田 文, Kōda Aya)
Voiced by: Minako Kotobuki (Japanese); Cassandra Lee Morris (English)
Named after Aya Kōda. She is a civilian who assisted Kunikida with a case, a spirited girl who calls herself a "warrior of justice" and practices martial arts every day. Aya is stubborn, refusing to take no for an answer, and makes fun of Kunikida often. She does not possess an ability. She later befriends vampire Bram Stoker, whom she calls "Bra-chan."

=== Shōsaku Katsura ===
Shōsaku Katsura (桂 正作, Katsura Shōsaku)
Voiced by: Masakazu Morita (Japanese); Johnny Yong Bosch (English)
Named after the main character of Doppo Kunikida's novel An Uncommon Common Man (非凡なる凡人, Hibon'naru Bonjin). He is a bomber with a grudge against Kunikida's ideals and attempts to sabotage them.

=== Agatha Christie ===
Dame Agatha Christie (デイム・アガサ・クリスティ, Deimu Agasa Kurisuti)
Voiced by: Maaya Sakamoto (Japanese); Erica Lindbeck (English)
Named after Agatha Christie. She is the Knight Commander of the Order of the Clock Tower. The details of her ability, And Then There Were None (そして誰もいなくなった, Soshite Dare mo Inakunatta), are currently unknown.

=== Arthur Rimbaud ===
Arthur Rimbaud (アーサー・ランボー)
Voiced by: Yūya Uchida (Japanese); Christopher Swindle (English)
Named after Arthur Rimbaud. He was a sub-executive of the Port Mafia and has an extreme aversion to cold. First known under the alias of "Randō (蘭堂, Randō)," he is later revealed to be a European spy, trying to find a god-like entity, Arahabaki, from within a military facility with his partner, Paul Verlaine. Following Paul's betrayal, he was forced to try and use Arahabaki to fight the military, but the failed attempt resulted in a massive explosion that destroyed the facility and Rimbaud's memories. His alias was taken from an incorrect pronunciation of his name that was written on his hat. His ability, Illuminations (イリュミナシオン, Iryuminashion), allows him to create a hyperspace under his control to the point which he can event disregard the rules of physics, rendering Chūya's powers useless and even withstanding Dazai's nullification to a limited degree.

=== Sōseki Natsume ===
Sōseki Natsume (夏目 漱石, Natsume Sōseki)
Voiced by: Hōchū Ōtsuka (Japanese); Greg Chun (English)
Named after Sōseki Natsume. He is the former mentor of Yukichi Fukuzawa and Ōgai Mori. He is first briefly featured in the light novel Dark Era and appears during the Cannibalism Arc to interrupt the fight between the Agency and Port Mafia. His ability, I Am A Cat (吾輩は猫である, Wagahai wa Neko de Aru), allows him to turn into a calico cat. He is regarded throughout Yokohama as one of the strongest ability users.

=== Nobuko Sasaki ===
Nobuko Sasaki (佐々城 信子, Sasaki Nobuko)
Voiced by: Sanae Kobayashi (Japanese); Wendee Lee (English)
Named after Nobuko Sasaki, Doppo Kunikida's first wife. A lecturer at a university in Tokyo. She is the Azure Apostle and former accomplice to the Azure King, her lover, and attempts to ruin the Armed Detective Agency after her lover's death.

== DEAD APPLE (film) ==
=== Tatsuhiko Shibusawa ===
Tatsuhiko Shibusawa (澁澤 龍彦, Shibusawa Tatsuhiko)
Voiced by: Kazuya Nakai (Japanese); Xander Mobus (English)
Named after Tatsuhiko Shibusawa. An original character created for the movie Dead Apple. His ability, Draconia (ドラコニア, Dorakonia), allows him to create a mysterious mist (known as "Dragon's Breath") that can separate abilities and their users. The separated abilities manifest as their own unique form, or they can manifest as a pitch-black, white-eyed mimic of its user. They are capable of communication.

== Gaiden (light novel) ==
=== Mizuki Tsujimura ===
Mizuki Tsujimura (辻村 深月, Tsujimura Mizuki)
Voiced by: Rie Takahashi (Japanese); Carrie Keranen (English)
Named after Mizuki Tsujimura. She is an agent of the Special Division for Unusual Powers and is assigned to Ayatsuji Yukito. Tsujimura's ability, Yesterday's Shadow Tag (きのうの影踏, Kinō no Kagefumi), allows her to create "baby shadows" and control them. It also takes the appearance of a grim reaper with a scythe when it automatically activates. Just like Kyōka, her mother transferred her ability to her, and she does not have complete control over it. It will activate immediately when she wants to kill someone, and the reaper shadow will execute them before she can attack, making Tsujimura unable to kill anyone herself.

=== Yukito Ayatsuji ===
Yukito Ayatsuji (綾辻 行人, Ayatsuji Yukito)
Voiced by: Sasai Hiroo
Named after Yukito Ayatsuji. A detective and one of the main characters in the Gaiden novel. He is currently one of the top-ranked people on the Japanese government's list of dangerous ability users. His ability, Another (アナザー, Anazā), allows him to see through the criminal in a murder case. Once the criminal behind a murder is identified, the killer will face certain death via an "accident."

== 55 Minutes (light novel) ==
=== Herbert George Wells ===
Herbert George Wells (ハーバート・ジョージ・ウェルズ, Hābāto Jōji Weruzu)
Named after H. G. Wells. A character featured in the light novel Bungo Stray Dogs: 55 Minutes. Wells's ability, Time Machine (タイムマシン, Taimu Mashin) allows her to manipulate time itself. She can send an individual back in time with the use of her camera, but this is limited to 55 minutes or 3300 seconds. Also, she is only able to transport someone to the past once. Originally, Wells is only able to transport a person to the past limited to several minutes, but after being utilized by "Gab" for countless of times, it was extended to 55 minutes.

=== Jules Gabriel Verne ===
Jules Gabriel Verne (ジュール・ガブリエル・ヴェルヌ, Jūru Gaburieru Verunu)
Named after Jules Verne. A character featured in the light novel Bungo Stray Dogs: 55 Minutes. He is one of the inhabitants of Standard Island, as the island itself is the form of his ability. Verne's ability, The Mysterious Island (神秘の島, Shinpi no Shima), allows him to absorb the abilities from any ability-user who dies on Standard Island.

== Reception ==
The characters of Bungo Stray Dogs have been popular in Japan with Crunchyroll noting that most of them appeared in a Newtype poll when the anime premiered in 2016. Manga.Tokyo enjoyed Osamu Dazai due to his appealing interactions with Doppo Kunikida while also enjoying Mamoru Miyano's performance as his voice actor. Atsushi's characterization has earned mixed responses. The Fandom Post noted that his power of becoming a tiger gave him potential to make goods rather than the curse he fears. On the other hand, Reel Run Down considered Atsushi as one of the weakest characters due to his constant insecure thoughts despite having multiple achievements in the storyline. Otaku USA noted that while Atsushi becomes a hero during the story, he is overshadowed by others character he found more interesting. Nevertheless, Atsushi's and Akutagawa's rivalry has also resulted into positive reaction due to how each character balance the other in terms of personality and how they become allies for a short for one of the most entertaining fights in the series. Anime News Network still enjoyed the new bond he formed with former Guild member Lucy Maud Montgomery; the reviewer noted Lucy became attracted to him and thus expected a form romance or love triangle would be composed between these two characters as well as Kyoka as this character also formed a strong bond with Atsushi. Concluding this comment, the reviewer expected this would happen the story would be benefitted from this type of subplot since Bungo Stray Dogs barely handled romance.
