= Osamu Dazai (Bungo Stray Dogs) =

Fictional character from Bungo Stray Dogs

- Bungo Stray Dogs character
- Osamu Dazai as drawn by Sango Harukawa
- First appearance: Bungo Stray Dogs, chapter 1: "Losing a Tiger may be a Blessing in Disguise" (2012)
- Created by: Kafka Asagiri; Sango Harukawa
- Voiced by: Mamoru Miyano (Japanese); Kaiji Tang (English)

In-universe information
- Occupation: The Port Mafia (14/15 - 18); The Armed Detective Agency (20 - Present)
- Family: Unknown as of present

Osamu Dazai (Japanese: 太宰 治, Hepburn: Osamu Dazai) is a fictional character and a major supporting character in the manga series Bungo Stray Dogs, which primarily follows Atsushi Nakajima. written by Kafka Asagiri and drawn by Sango Harukawa. He is a member of the Armed Detective Agency who mentors Atsushi Nakajima into his group while dealing with other enemies facing them. Dazai is also a former executive of the underworld organization, the Port Mafia, with the light novels and anime adaptation dealing with his backstory as a member of the mafia. He has also appeared in related works inspired by Bungo Stray Dogs.

Osamu Dazai's look and personality were designed to contrast with the young lead, Atsushi's. His name is the same as that of the late author Osamu Dazai, and his personality was partially based on the main character from the television series The Mentalist. His backstory was also influenced by the real-life Dazai, as the author was captivated by a picture of him and two other writers. In the animated version of the series, the character is voiced by Mamoru Miyano in Japanese and Kaiji Tang in English.

The fictional Osamu Dazai has been popular in Japan, often appearing in polls and winning awards from different magazines. Critical reception of his portrayal in the anime and manga has been mostly positive due to his interactions with his partners, Doppo Kunikida and Chuuya Nakahara, his personality, and his character traits.

During his time in the mafia, Dazai was known as the 'youngest ever executive', 'The Demon Prodigy' (not canon name, from a fan translation error of the "The Heartless Cur" short story), 'The Black Wraith' (canon, from the "Osamu Dazai and the Dark Era" light novel) and more. He also specialised in torture among other things, mentoring Ryuunosuke Akutagawa and creating all of the port mafia's surveillance tactics.

== Creation and design ==
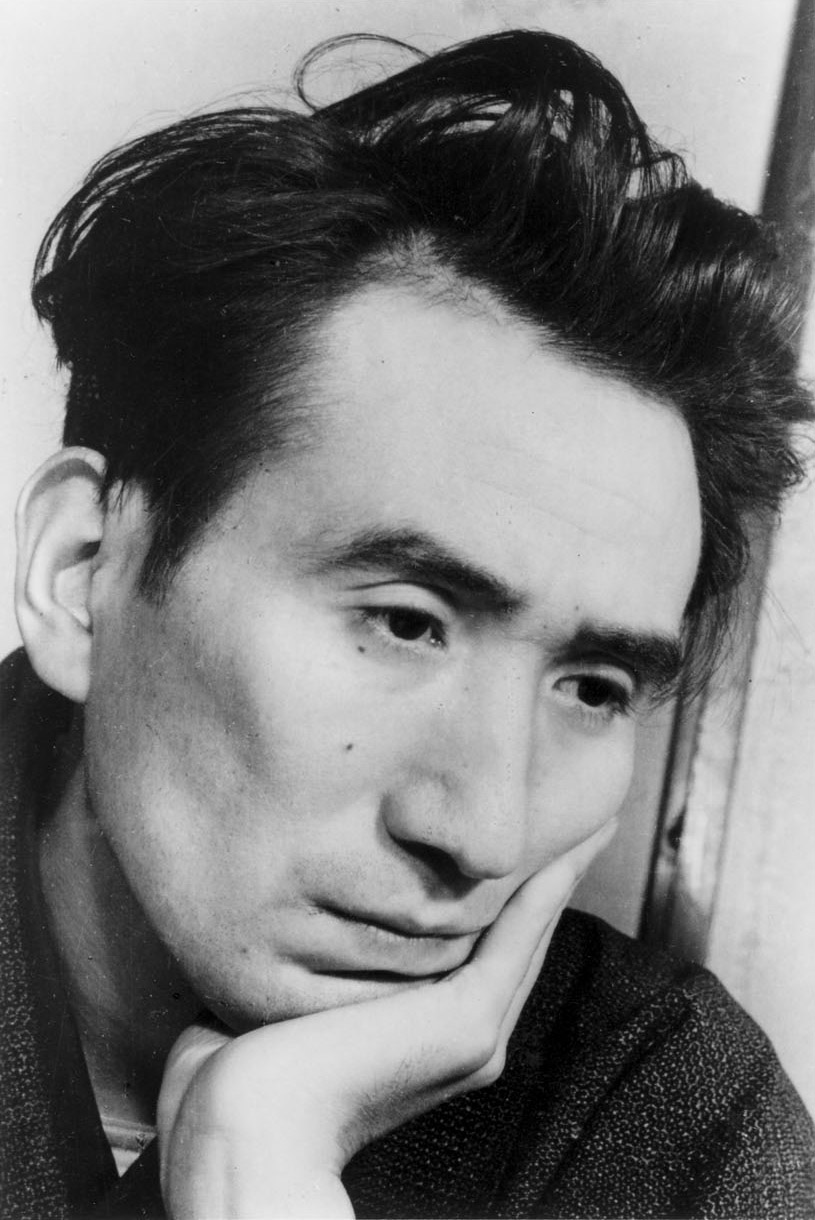
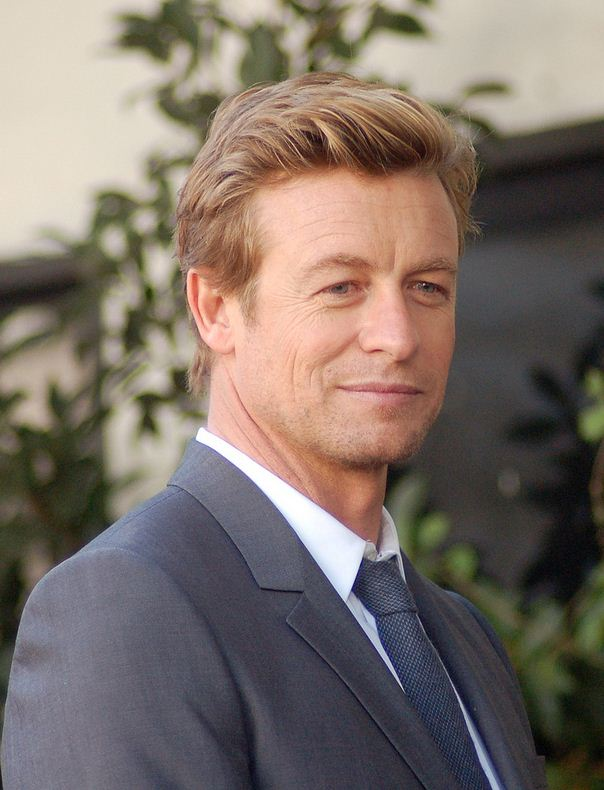
The real Osamu Dazai was a major influence on the fictional character, while most of his personality was based on Simon Baker's performance as Patrick Jane in The Mentalist.

Named after Japanese author Osamu Dazai (1909–1948), Kafka Asagiri created the fictional character to contrast with the protagonist, Atsushi Nakajima. His traits are his slender figure, humorous personality, and persistent attempts to commit suicide. When conceptualizing his design, artist Sango Harukawa covered Dazai's body in bandages alongside other items meant to represent his obsession with suicide. Asagiri was surprised by Harukawa's designs for the duo, which incorporated several contrasts between the pair. One of which was the idea of balancing their colors, so Dazai's brown hair contrasted with Atsushi's white hair. Another was height, with Atsushi being 5'7 to Dazai's 5'11. In terms of roles, if Atsushi is the hero, Dazai is the sage in a similar fashion the role of Merlin to King Arthur.Though seemingly inspired by Dazai, the manga character is not like the author, but rather resembling Oba Yōzō, the main character of the author's novel No Longer Human in terms of a deep desire for death, a sense of lacking being fundamentally human, and having undergone multiple suicide attempts.

Dazai's novel No Longer Human is one of Asagiri's favorite works, to the point that it inspired Bungo Stray Dogs, replicating the themes of the novel. While the first chapter was conceptualized with both Dazai and Atsushi, the author wanted to have another third character who would "suffer" alongside Dazai. This eventually led to the inclusion of Doppo Kunikida as Dazai's partner, who contrasts Dazai's joker personality with his serious portrayal. His personality was also influenced by Simon Baker's performance as Patrick Jane in The Mentalist.

In writing Dazai's backstory for the light novels, Asagiri was inspired by a picture that had the real artists Dazai, Ango Sakaguchi, and Sakunosuke Oda. The seemingly natural state of the trio inspired Asagiri to write Osamu Dazai and the Dark Era. Another aspect of the trio that inspired the fiction was how the real Dazai reacted to Oda's death. The real Dazai was also a fan of Ryūnosuke Akutagawa's works, but in fiction, this was reversed in terms of the relationship between the two characters with the same name. Asagiri decided to keep this reason up to the reader. The novels were also written to address Dazai's character arc from a mafia executive to a detective.

When first reading the manga, anime director Yasuomi Umetsu was impressed by the relationship Dazai had with his students, Atsushi and Ryunosuke Akutagawa. This gave the staff ideas for making the symbolic sequences in the opening and closing video scenes of the anime series where the three characters are featured. The staff noted Dazai had a mentor-like relationship with Atsushi and Akutagawa, which led to scenes where he is seen trying to pat their heads. For the film Bungo Stray Dogs: Dead Apple, Asagiri suggested that Studio Bones change Dazai's hairstyle. Despite this redesign and Dazai being associated with the main villain, Asagiri said they are not the main focus of the film; that is, on Atsushi, Kyoka Izumi, and Akutagawa. Furthermore, Asagiri conceived the idea of the story starting with Dazai's death and how he would be revived throughout the story. He wondered, however, what the cause of death should have been. Another idea for Dazai's characterization in the film was not to change it but to focus on how he treats other people.

Voice actor Mamoru Miyano portrayed Dazai in Japanese. Since being hired to be the English voice actor for Osamu Dazai, Kaiji Tang has looked forward to working on Bungo Stray Dogs, having previously watched the series. Tang was delighted to voice Dazai for the English dub, attracted by his comical attitude.

== Appearances ==
Dazai takes the appearance of a young, tall Japanese man, being around 22 years old. He has short, messy brown hair that cups his face, having messy bangs, middle part covering his nose almost fully, sides nearly covering his eyes. He also has light brown eyes with medium length eyelashes. He has fair skin, and unpainted nails. He wears a beige/sand colored trench coat and a bolo tie with a blue gem over a button down collared shirt. Under his trench coat and on his neck his bandages can be visible though there is an brief absence of them on his neck throughout various episodes including season 5 episode 8 as Studio Bones made an oversight.

=== In Bungo Stray Dogs ===
==== Manga ====
A member of the Armed Detective Agency who takes Atsushi under his wing, Dazai is known for being a "suicidal maniac" as a direct result of his repetitive attempts and his strong desire to commit (double) suicide and die comfortably one day with a beautiful woman. Beneath his carefree, comedic and relaxed demeanor, however, Dazai is extremely cunning, intelligent, and mysterious. He was once a fearsome and well-respected executive for the Port Mafia. His ability, No Longer Human (人間失格, Ningen Shikkaku), lets him completely nullify any supernatural ability by touch. Dazai takes a liking to Atsushi as his underling starts working for the Agency, believing him to be superior to some of the mafia's men. When allowing himself to be kidnapped by the Port Mafia, Dazai tells his former underling Ryūnosuke Akutagawa that Atsushi is superior to him, angering Akutagawa. However, the relationship turns into an alliance between the Agency and the mafia to face a group known as the Guild. During the fight, Dazai joins forces with his former mafia partner, Chuuya Nakahara, to face members of the Guild.

After the Guild's defeat, Dazai meets Fyodor Dostoyevsky, the leader of the Rats in the House of the Dead, who has one of his allies wound the leaders of the Agency and Port Mafia to generate chaos between each group to see who will get the cure. Dazai is then shot by one of Dostoyevsky's underlings and ends up in the hospital. On recovering, Dazai has the Agency's members track Dostoyevsky's underling, who has the key to the cure, while he and members from the Guild manage to locate Dostoyevsky and have him arrested. However, Dostoyevsky's men threaten the Agency again, and Dazai is imprisoned by Saigiku Jōno from the Hunting Dogs military government forces. Despite his imprisonment, Dazai requests help from Ango to give orders to the Agency to fight against Dostoyevsky's Decay of the Angel members and the government, ending up in the same prison as Dostoyevsky, where both plan their underling's works.

Fyodor's underlings Nikolai Gogol and Sigma rescue the two from the prison, but Decay of Angels member Nikolai gives the prisoner a test to determine who should be allowed to leave alone. He injects both with deadly poison and gives them material to choose from; Dazai takes Sigma. As Dazai and Sigma prepare to leave the prison, it is revealed that the former had worked with Ango to take down Fyodor there and have Sigma use his skill to absorb his knowledge. However, Dazai hurt his leg after helping Sigma and is shot repeatedly in the face by Chuuya, who is being manipulated by Fyodor. The anime adaptation reveals that Chuuya was pretending to be a vampire to fake Dazai's death and that Dazai was waiting for his colleagues to get rid of Fukuchi's army and kill Fyodor in the process once his allies failed to take him out of prison with a helicopter.

==== In light novels ====
The light novels follow Dazai's backstory. Osamu Dazai's Entrance Exam plot describes how Dazai joined the Detective Agency and met his future partner. At the age of 20, he joined the Armed Detective Company on the recommendation of Chief Taneda of the Ministry of Internal Affairs' Special Ability Department and—as a newbie—was entrusted by Fukuzawa Yukichi to Doppo Kunikida. Shortly afterwards, they were both assigned to work on the Serial Disappearance of Yokohama's Visitors Case, which Kunikida decided would be Dazai's entrance exam. Osamu Dazai and the Dark Era involves his relationship with hitman Oda Sakunosuke four years before the events of the manga, when he was working for the mafia, culminating with Oda encouraging Dazai to leave the group and find a new way of living that does not involve committing murder. Dazai, Chuuya, Fifteen Years Old follows Dazai's life as a member of the Port Mafia. Dazai, under the watchful eye of Ōgai Mori, receives his first mission to investigate a ghost. He and Chuuya Nakahara used to be partners during his days in the Mafia, and together—after they had decimated an enemy organization in one night—they became notorious and dubbed the "Criminal Underworld's Worst Enemy", earning the title Twin Dark (双黒, Sōkoku) in the original Japanese, and Double Black in the English dub.

The character is also present in the light novel BEAST: White Akutagawa, Black Atsushi, in an alternate version of his world, still working for Port Mafia alongside Atsushi and Kyoka Izumi. He also appears in the light novel Bungo Stray Dogs: 55 Minutes, where the Agency is given the job of finding a thief.

=== In other media ===
Dazai appears in the 2018 film Bungo Stray Dogs: Dead Apple as a member of the Detective Agency. At the request of Ango Sakaguchi, the Armed Detective Agency investigates Tatsuhiko Shibusawa, a self-described "collector", tied to an incident involving multiple suicides. Dazai allies himself with Shibusawa to counter his plans, and he is stabbed and left to die. Chuuya manages to save Dazai, thanks to the latter's planning and prediction of Shibusawa's betrayal. The manga adaptation of the film also includes Dazai.

Dazai is present in the ongoing spinoff manga and animated series Bungo Stray Dogs Wan!, where the characters are presented in minimalistic form and experience comedic hijinks.

The 2022 live-action film that adapted Beast had Rui Tabuchi portraying the role of Dazai.

In the mobile phone game Bungo Stray Dogs: Tales of the Lost, Dazai appears as a playable character. He is also a guest character in Yume 100. In the series' play, Dazai was played by Hideya Tawada.

== Reception ==
=== Critical ===
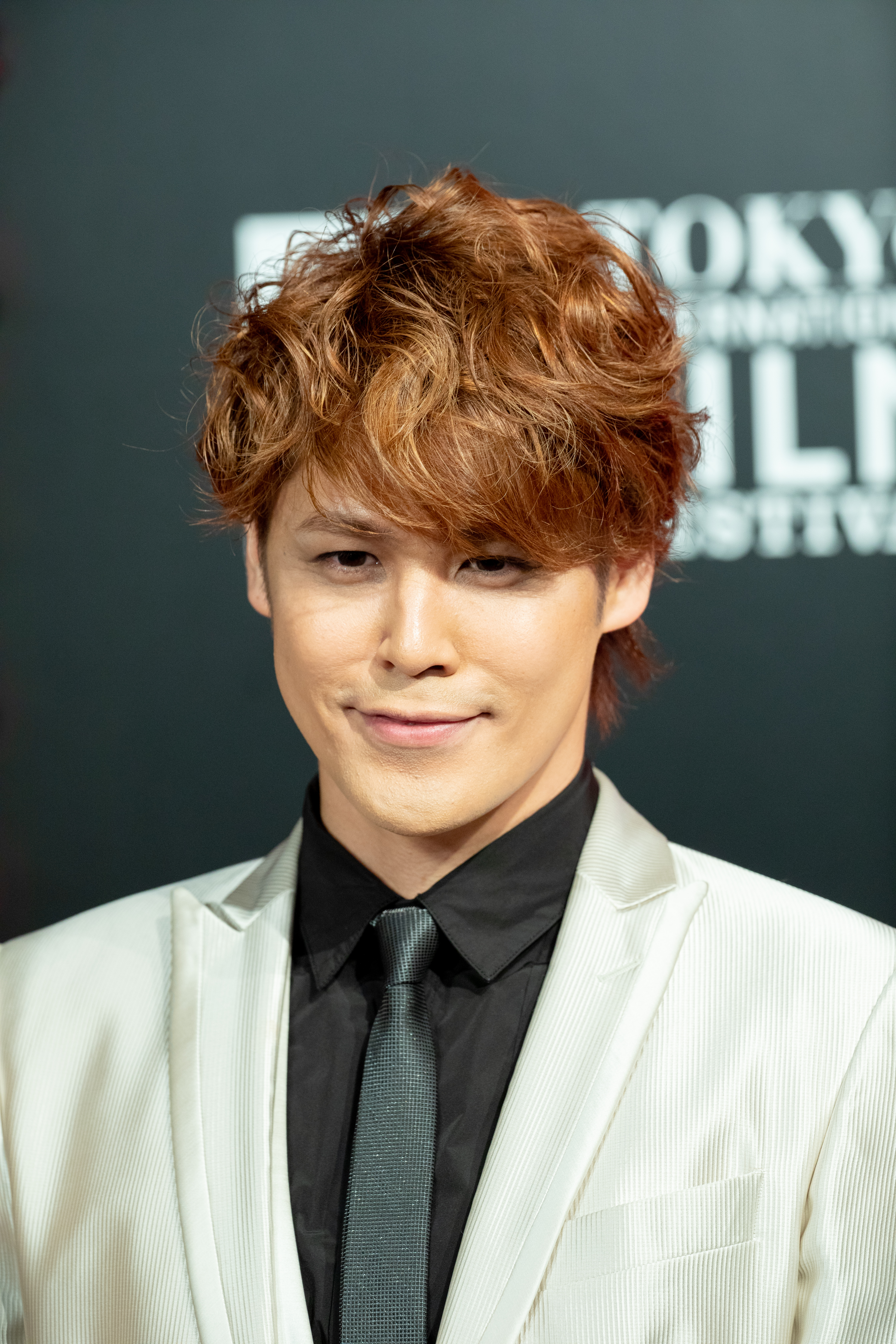
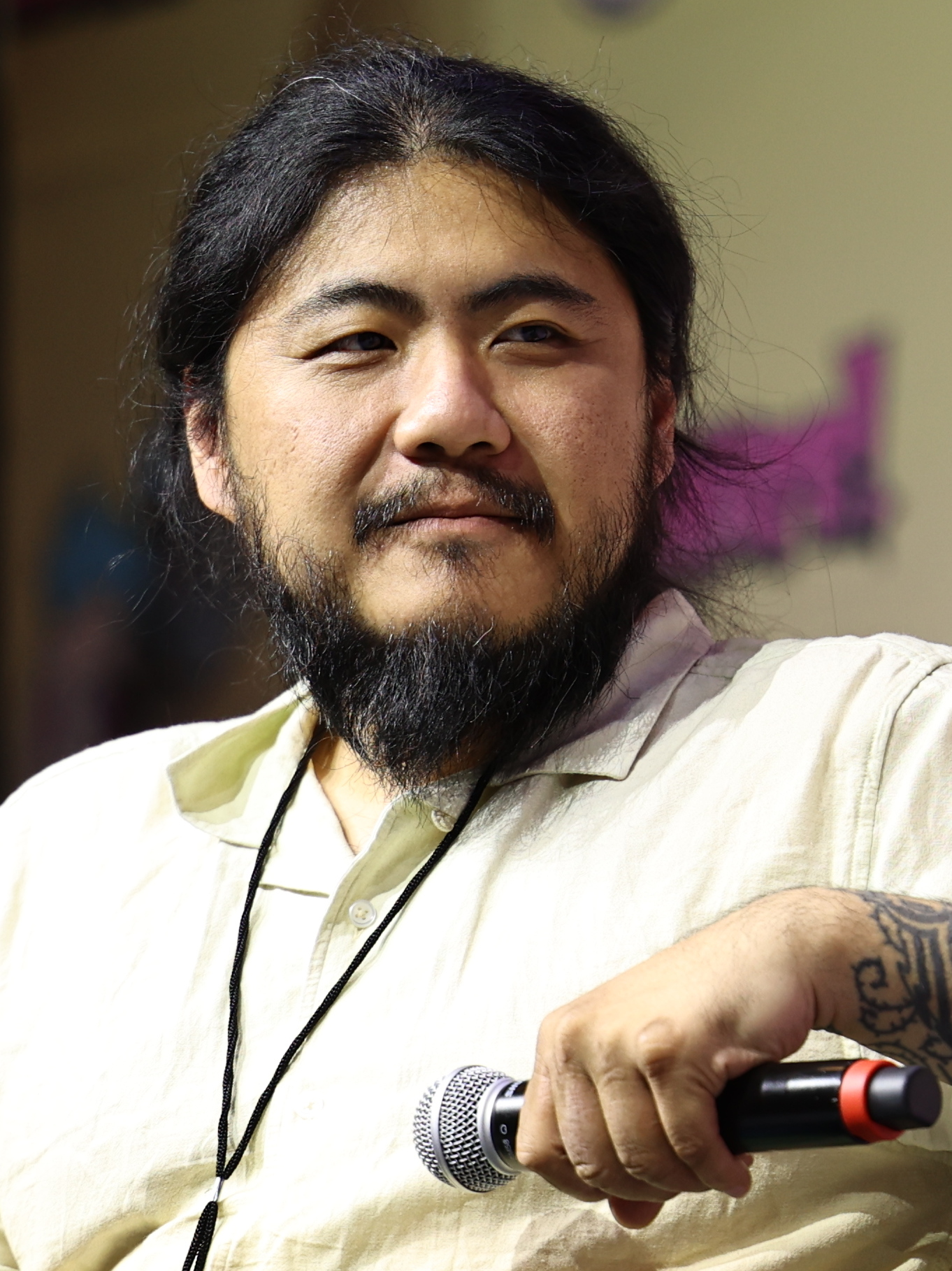
Mamoru Miyano (left) voices Dazai in Japanese, while Kaiji Tang voices him in English.

After his introduction, the site Manga.Tokyo and Fandom Post welcomed Dazai, commenting on his appealing interactions with Doppo Kunikida which come across as childish and intelligent. His interactions with Atsushi also received positive responses, with Comic Book Resources noting that Dazai's relationship with Atsushi is also popular within the fandom for how the former acts like a mentor to the protagonist. Both Anime News Network and Anime UK News were more critical because of the black comedy of his frequent suicide attempts, something that referenced the real-life Dazai. Charles Solomon from Animation Magazine compared Dazai with Vash the Stampede from Trigun due to their flirting and comical personalities, which led the series to have notable comic appeal until its change to a more violent tone.

Writers commented on Dazai's past persona from the light novels and its animated adaptation. Critics praised the relationship between Dazai and Odas since it shows the impact the peaceful hitman had on Dazai's growth as a person, which contrasted with his dark personality from the past, Dazai's debut in the anime's third season earned praise from Manga.Tokyo for once again exploring his teenage years, where his relationship with Chuuya Nakahara is revealed in the form of flashback episodes. Anime News Network noted how dark this incarnation of Dazai is, as he does not appear to care for other people and instead ponders the idea of killing himself. Nevertheless, the site liked his dynamic with Chuuya, with the Fandom Post echoing similar comments, especially during the Guild arc, as the duo can still fight together despite their distanced relationships. The relationship between the two former mafia allies was noted by Soochow University as one of the most famous shipped characters in China, which led to the nickname "DaChu" (太中).

Osaka Metropolitan University said Dazai's portrayal as a man escaping from the mafia is predicated on the real Dazai, who similarly turned from the Communist Party to the Japan Romantic School and then committed suicide in 1948 after several attempts. J. Laturnas from the University of British Columbia noticed that Dazai's characterization in Bungo Stray Dogs and Bungo and Alchemist helped to revitalize the original author's works. The Dazai in Bungo Stray Dogs is not a characterification of the author himself but of the author’s star text: an abstract representation of "Dazai" and his literature in popular imagination. Likewise, Dazai's character is heavily inspired by No Longer Human and its protagonist, Ōba Yōzō, with a few references to the historical author's life, personality, and preferences. In regards to his past, he has neither desires nor a reason to live and has suffered in solitude for most of his life. Thus, he resorts to playing the role of a clown and hiding his true emotions with suicidal antics. However, Dazai’s character has still made significant progress towards the fulfillment of Oda's wish and uses his inner darkness and past experiences to serve as a guiding light.

Besides his regular appearances, the Anime News Network enjoyed Dazai's alternate actions in Wan, such as him being a kindergarten teacher, as enjoyable alternate takes on the series. In a review of Bungo Stray Dogs: Dead Apple, the site pointed out that Dazai was one of only two characters who understood Shibusawa. Anime News Network felt that his role in the film, teaming up with Shibusawa and Fyodor, was too difficult to complete based on multiple stakes. Though Chuuya does not interact too much with Dazai in Dead Apple, their only encounters were noted in the book World Cinema On Demand: Global Film Cultures in the Era of Online Distribution to stand out for their homoerotic overtones among Chinese fans.

Dazai's actors were also well received by the media. Manga.Tokyo has enjoyed Mamoru Miyano's performance as Dazai's voice actor ever since his introduction. The Fandom Post said that Dazai is a fun character, with Mamoru Miyano's "acting range helping his versatile characterization immensely." Dazai was also voted the second-best Miyano character in a poll from AnimeAnime. In another review, the site again enjoyed Miyano's performance as he changed his vocal tone to characterize Dazai's personality in the past. UK Anime News further complimented Miyano, saying he fits the "eccentric personality of Dazai extremely well." Reel Run Down found Kaiji Tang's work as Dazai enjoyable due to the joy he brings to the role.

=== Popularity ===
The character has been highly popular in Japan. In 2017, Dazai was voted the fifth-best male character in Newtype magazine for his role in the anime series. In the 2017–2018 Newtype Anime Awards, Dazai took third place for his role in the film. In another poll, he took second place. He also had a cameo in the anime film Eureka Seven: Hi-Evolution. In a 2017 Otaku Hit Ranking poll, Dazai took tenth place in the category: Which one of these 2D characters do you think has been the most popular this year? In a Newtype poll, Dazai was voted the fourteenth-most-popular male anime character from the 2010s. Rebecca Silverman referred to Dazai as her favorite character from 2016; despite first appearing in multiple suicide jokes, she felt he showed depths that portray him as a more mature person who influences Atsushi and Akutagawa to become stronger people. In a Charapedia poll from 2016, Dazai was voted the most sexually appealing character in anime by female voters, while he took second place behind Rem from Re:Zero in the aggregate poll. In an Anime!Anime! poll, Dazai and Chuya were voted as one of the best anime rivals turned into allies.

During an interview, Anime News Network regarded Dazai as one of the series' most popular characters, leading to far more appearances in other works besides the manga. Asagiri was also surprised by this trend, and he considered that while there are several traits involving him besides Miyano's performance, he believes the reason for the character's popularity could be how interesting the core aspect behind his suicide attempts is, which attracts others, which he found unique based on his readings of the book No Longer Human written by the real Dazai.
