= Atsushi Nakajima =

Japanese novelist (1909–1942)

- 中島 敦
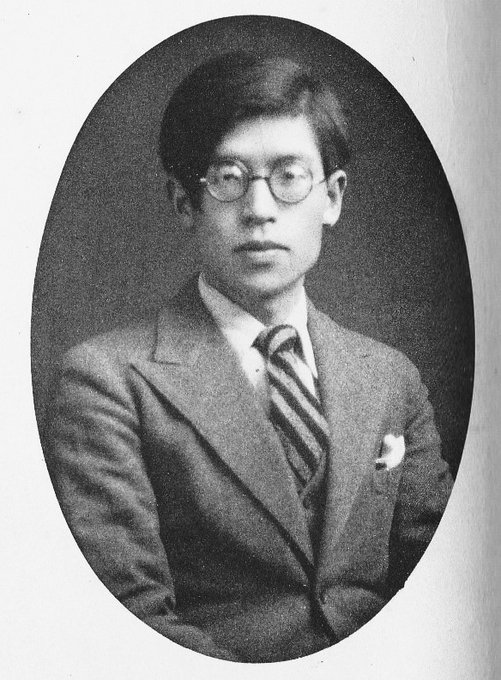
- Atsushi Nakajima in 1936
- Born: 5 May 1909; Yotsuya, Tokyo, Japan
- Died: 4 December 1942 (aged 33); Setagaya, Tokyo, Japan
- Education: Ryuzan Primary School; Seoul Middle School; Tokyo First Higher School; University of Tokyo
- Occupations: Novelist, Teacher
- Spouse: Taka Hashimoto (m. 1933–1942)
- Children: 3
- Writing career
- Language: Japanese
- Notable works: The Moon Over the Mountain (1942); Light, Wind and Dreams (1942)

Japanese name
- Kanji: 中島 敦
- Hiragana: なかじま あつし
Transcriptions
- Romanization: Nakajima Atsushi

Atsushi Nakajima (中島 敦, Nakajima Atsushi; 5 May 1909 – 4 December 1942) was a Japanese author known for his unique style and self-introspective themes. His major works include "The Moon Over the Mountain" and "Light, Wind and Dreams" with the former being published in many Japanese textbooks.

During his life he wrote about twenty works, including unfinished works, typically inspired by Classical Chinese stories and his own life experiences.

== Early life ==
Atsushi Nakajima was born in Yotsuya ward, Tokyo on 5 May 1909, into a family of Confucian scholars. His grandfather, Nakajima Busan (jp) was a sinologist and member of the school of Confucian studies founded by Kameda Bōsai. His father, Tabito Nakajima was a kanbun instructor, and three of Nakajima's uncles were also learned in classical Chinese studies.

Nakajima Busan had established his own school for the study of Confucianism in his home in Saitama Prefecture. There, both Nakajima's father and his mother, Chiyoko, received training in Confucianism.

Chiyoko had been a primary school teacher before marrying Tabito. Tabito received accreditation from the Ministry of Education in 1897 and taught kanbun at a middle school level. The couple married in 1908 and separated two years later, less than one year after Nakajima was born. The infant Nakajima was sent to Saitama Prefecture in February of 1910 to be raised by his grandparents. Nakajima Busan died one year after his grandson was sent to live with them.

In February 1914, Nakajima was sent to Koriyama in Nara Prefecture to join his father, Tabito, who had remarried. Tabito's work as a teacher required him to move often, bringing his family with him. In 1916, Nakajima enrolled in Koriyama Primary and Higher School, only to transfer in 1918 to Hamamatsu Primary School in Shizuoka Prefecture, as Tabito had taken up a teaching position at Hamamatsu Middle School.

In 1920, the Nakajima family moved to Seoul. Despite his frequent transfers, Nakajima was known for being an intelligent student who consistently received good grades. However, constantly being on the move combined with a less than ideal home life resulted in a sense of isolation that would later reflect in Nakajima's writing.

Nakajima was not very close to his father and his stepmother abused him. In 1923, when he was fourteen years old, Nakajima's step-mother gave birth to his half-sister, Sumiko, and died during childbirth. In 1924, Nakajima's father married his third wife, who was also abusive.

Throughout his childhood, Nakajima had poor health. He developed asthma at the age of seventeen and continued to suffer from it for the rest of his life.

In 1926, Nakajima graduated from Seoul Middle School and entered the literature program of the First Higher School in Tokyo. In November 1927, he began contributing short stories to the school's alumni magazine and joined the editorial staff of the magazine in 1929. He graduated from Tokyo First Higher School in 1930.

Despite his family's deep roots in Chinese studies and his own knowledge on the topic, when he enrolled into the University of Tokyo, Nakajima chose to study Japanese literature. He wrote his graduation thesis on the topic of Aestheticism. The thesis, titled "The Study of Aestheticism," traces the influences of modern Japanese literature to Edgar Allan Poe, Oscar Wilde and Charles Baudelaire. The thesis then also proceeds to analyze the works of Tanizaki Jun'ichirō, Mori Ōgai, Ueda Bin and Nagai Kafū. Nakajima's thesis was published in 1933. That same year, he entered graduate school at Tokyo University with the intention of studying the work of Mori Ōgai. He withdrew in 1934 to take on a teaching position and support his new family.

In 1932, Nakajima married Taka Hashimoto. The couple had three children: Takeshi, Masako (died three days after birth), and Kaku.

== Literary career ==
His literary career started very early into his life. After graduating from his school in Seoul, he joined the Tokyo First Higher School's (第一高等学校) literary program where he began writing fiction. In 1927 he began publishing in the school's literary magazine and by 1929 he became a member of the editorial staff. During this period he began showing his signature style of setting his stories in exotic locations such as China or Korea along with recurring themes of self-doubt, questions on the meaning of life, isolation, fate and the nature of human existence. Some of his later works also display a sense of irony and satire.

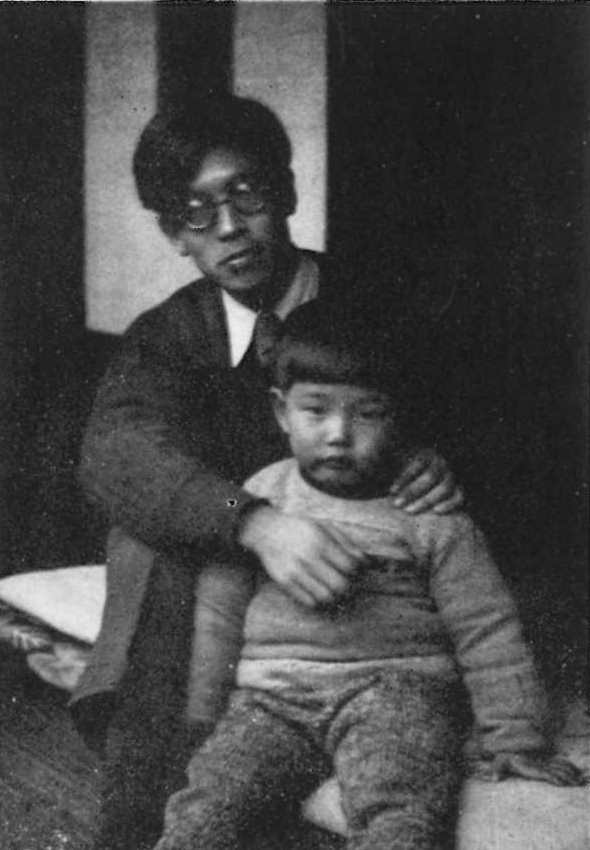
Nakajima with his oldest son, Takeshi, in 1934.

Despite his skills as an author, Nakajima barely published any of his works to literary magazines due to him having high literary standards and Nakajima lacking the confidence to publish in these journals.

=== The Moon Over the Mountain ===
One of Nakajima's most well-known literary works is "The Moon Over the Mountain" (山月記, Sangetsuki) sometimes also known as "Tiger Poet" (人虎伝, Jinko-den). The story is derived from a story from the Tang dynasty period. The story was first published in the February 1942 issue of Bungakukai.

"The Moon Over the Mountain" tells the story of Yuan Can who recently had heard about a man-eating tiger roaming around his area. One day he encountered the tiger and the tiger started speaking to him. Yuan Can discovered that the tiger was his friend named Li Zheng (李徴), Li Zheng was smart and could qualify as a government official but his true ambition was to be a poet. Unfortunately, he failed and started working as a government official. While traveling for official business one day, Li Zheng claims that he went insane and transformed into a tiger. Li Zheng claims that this was because of the "cowardly pride" and "arrogant shame" he harbored within him which caused him to transform into the tiger. Li Zheng laments that as a tiger he could no longer become a famous poet, the two then parted ways.

== Teaching job ==
In 1933, he accepted a teaching position at Yokohama Girls' Higher School, which was managed by a former pupil of Nakajima's father. During his time in the School, Nakajima was exposed to more of western literature, such as the works of Blaise Pascal, Anatole France and Robert Louis Stevenson. During this time he translated works by D. H. Lawrence, Aldous Huxley and Franz Kafka into Japanese, while continuing to write fiction.

== Micronesia and Palau ==
In 1941, he resigned from his teaching job and joined the Japanese government working as an editor for a Japanese language textbook set to be published in Palau. He believed that the warmer climate in Palau would cure his asthma. Nakajima's choice to visit the southern seas may have been influenced by Robert Louis Stevenson's Vailima Letters, which described Stevenson's stay in Samoa. After some time in Palau, he took a boat to Micronesia on 15 September 1941 for the purpose of inspecting the schools in the region. He returned to Palau on 5 November 1941. During this part of his life, Nakajima kept a diary and recorded topics such as the native culture and practices.

In letters he wrote, Nakajima disagrees with the Japanese exploitation of the island natives. He wished that he could do more for the people of Palau and Micronesia other than teaching them. He wrote that he had not experienced any asthma attacks, but instead felt lethargic due to the tropical heat. The food in Micronesia supplied by the Japanese were also lacking. Because of this, he wished to quit his job as soon as possible. By the end of 1941, Nakajima had requested a transfer and returned to Japan in March 1942.

== Final years ==
In 1942, Nakajima contracted pneumonia after returning from Palau. While bedridden for two months, he published "Light, Wind and Dreams," a fictionalized biography of Robert Louis Stevenson. The story was critically acclaimed, even becoming a finalist for the Akutagawa Prize.

At this point he resigned from his job at the South Seas Agency and fully devoted himself to being a writer. However, this did not last long. His health greatly declined due to the asthma medication he had taken. He was immediately hospitalized. When he was hospitalized, no one expected him to die. His father, expecting his stay to be short, did not visit him in the hospital. After a night of asthma attacks, Nakajima died on the morning of 4 December 1942.

== In popular culture ==
A character based on Atsushi Nakajima is the main character of Bungo Stray Dogs, a manga and anime franchise in which characters are named after major literary figures. Nakajima's character works for the Armed Detective Agency and has a supernatural ability named after his short story "The Moon Over the Mountain," which allows him to transform into a tiger.

Nakajima also appears in the online game Bungo and Alchemist, an online collectible card game with characters based on literary figures.

== Bibliography ==
- The Moon Over the Mountain (山月記, Sangetsuki) (1942)
- Light, Wind and Dreams (光と風と夢, Hikari to kaze to yume) (1942)

=== English translations ===
- Legend of the Master (名人伝), translated by Reiko Seri and Doc Kane. Kobe, Japan, Maplopo, 2020

== See also ==
- Japanese literature
- List of Japanese authors
