= Tatsuhiko Shibusawa =

Japanese novelist, translator, literary critic, art critic

- Born: 8 May 1928; Tokyo, Japan
- Died: 5 August 1987 (aged 59); Kamakura, Kanagawa, Japan
- Occupations: Writer, translator of French literature
- Writing career
- Genres: Novels, essays

Tatsuhiko Shibusawa (澁澤 龍彦, Shibusawa Tatsuhiko; 8 May 1928 – 5 August 1987) was the pen name of Shibusawa Tatsuo, a Japanese novelist, art critic, and translator of French literature active during the Shōwa period. Shibusawa wrote many short stories and novels based on French literature and Japanese classics. His essays about black magic, demonology, and eroticism are also popular in Japan.

== Early life ==
Shibusawa was born in the upper-class neighborhood of Takanawa in Tokyo. His father was a banker, and his mother was the daughter of an industrialist and politician. He was distantly related to the industrialist Shibusawa Eiichi. He was also related to composer Hisatada Otaka and critic Keijiro Okawa. While going through high school during World War II, he had the ambition to be an aeronautical engineer. However, the possibilities for a career in that field disappeared with Japan's defeat in the war, and Shibusawa received notably poor scores in the German language, which was widely used in engineering at the time. He turned his attention to study of the French language instead.

In 1950, after working as an editor at the Modern Nihon magazine under Junnosuke Yoshiyuki for two years (one of the authors he edited was Hisao Juran), Shibusawa entered the University of Tokyo's school of French literature, where he enthusiastically embraced the avant-garde movement of surrealism, which started in France after World War I. He was especially attracted to André Breton, and this led him to learn of the works of the Marquis de Sade.

Although Shibusawa did graduate from a master's course at the University of Tokyo, he had to abandon plans to become a professor because of tuberculosis, and started his career as a freelance writer instead. He relocated from Tokyo to the resort town of Kamakura, Kanagawa prefecture in 1946, due to its reputation for having a healthful climate for lung disorders, and continued to live there to his death.

After publishing his first book, a translation of Jean Cocteau's Le Grand Ecart (大跨びらき) in 1954, Shibusawa began to introduce French literature to Japanese readers through his translations. With the death of his father, he faced financial difficulties, and obtained a part-time job at the publishing company Iwanami Shoten, where he met his future wife, Sumiko Yagawa, who was also a translator and author. During this period, he also briefly flirted with politics, supporting the Japan Communist Party in an election for the mayor of Miura, Kanagawa by joining political rallies and distribution leaflets satirizing the opposing candidate.

== Literary career ==
In 1959, Shibusawa published Akutoku no sakae (悪徳の栄え), a translation of de Sade's Juliette. The work was immediately controversial, and in 1960, he and Kyōji Ishii (石井 恭二, Ishii Kyōji), the publisher, were prosecuted for public obscenity. During the trial, which is called Sade Trial (サド裁判, Sado saiban) in Japan, Kenzaburō Ōe, Shūsaku Endō, Shōhei Ōoka and many other authors testified for the defense. However, in 1969, in an important decision, the Japanese Supreme Court ruled that Shibusawa and Ishii were guilty. He was fined 70,000 yen (slightly less than US$200 at the time); the triviality of the sum greatly outraged him, given the nine years that the trial had taken from his life.

Shibusawa, although discouraged, was not deterred, and continued to write works on eroticism and to translate the works of de Sade, as well as other French authors; he also produced essays and art criticism, and became a specialist in the study of medieval demonology.

In September 1970, Shibusawa made his first overseas trip, a vacation to Europe. He was seen off at Haneda Airport by his close friend Yukio Mishima. Madame de Sade by Mishima (1965) is entirely based on Shibusawa's The Life of Marquis de Sade (サド侯爵の生涯, Sado kōshaku no shōgai; 1964); but on the other hand, today it is known that Shibusawa himself plagiarized his own work largely from Vie du Marquis de Sade by Gilbert Lely (1961). In The Temple of Dawn (1969), Mishima created the character Yasushi Imanishi based on Shibusawa's personality. When Mishima died, Shibusawa wrote the obituary.

Introduced by Mishima in his late twenties, he met Tatsumi Hijikata, the founder of Butoh. He frequented Hijikata's stage performances and when Hijikata died suddenly in 1986, he served as the chairman of the funeral committee.

In 1965, he wrote an introduction to Hans Bellmer's ball-jointed doll in the magazine "New Lady". The doll artist Shimon Yotsuya was shocked to read this article and began making ball-jointed dolls. In other words, it can be said that Shibusawa created one of the triggers for the rise of ball-jointed dolls in modern Japan.

In 1981, he published a fantasy novel titled Karakusa monogatari ("Karakusa Story"). Other fantasy novels include Utsuro bune (うつろ舟; "Hollow Ship") and Takaoka shinnō kōkai-ki ("Takaoka's Travels").

Shibusawa died of a rupture of a carotid aneurysm while he was hospitalized for larynx cancer in 1987. His grave is at the temple of Jochi-ji in Kamakura.

== Major works ==
- Bokumetsu no fu (撲滅の賦; "The Song of the Eradication")
- Epikurosu no abarabone (エピクロスの肋骨; "The Rib of Epicurus")
- Inuōkami toshi (犬狼都市; "Cynopolis")
- Karakusa monogatari (唐草物語; "Arabesque Stories")
- Takaoka shinnō kōkai-ki (高丘親王航海記; "Takaoka's Travels"). First translated into Italian by Alessandro Passarella as Le cronache marine del principe Takaoka, Atmosphere Libri, 2020 (ISBN 9788865643525), and later into other languages such as French and English in the following years.

== See also ==
- Japanese literature
- List of Japanese authors
