= Screen Mode =

Japanese pop band

- Origin: Japan
- Genres: Anison, J-pop
- Years active: 2013–present
- Label: Lantis (2013-present)
- Members: Yu-YOU; Masamoto
- Website: screenmode.net

Screen Mode (スクリーンモード), stylised as SCREEN mode, is a Japanese music unit that debuted on November 27, 2013, under the label Lantis.

== Members ==
- Yuu-YOU-: Voice actor Yū Hayashi. Vocalist. Born in Kanagawa Prefecture on April 2, 1983. Affiliated with Ken Productions.
- Masatomo: Sound producer Masatomo Ota (太田雅友 Ota Masatomo). In charge of guitars. Born in Aichi Prefecture on February 26, 1976.

== Background ==
Masatomo Ota started his guitar and band activities as a teenager. He debuted as a composer in 2003 and became a sound producer for many artists like Yukari Tamura, Mimori Suzuko, and Yu Serizawa.

Yu Hayashi started as a child actor for theatrical company Gekidan Himawari. He voiced in numerous dubbing roles for live-action and animated characters.

The two first met during the production of TV anime Gingitsune, and formed the unit "SCREEN mode". Their unit is named from the desire to impress the listener while changing the "video" (= SCREEN) of the sound born by mixing the vocals of Yuu and the production of Masatomo into various "modes" (= mode).

== Discography ==
=== Singles ===
- "Moonlight STORY" (November 27, 2013), ending theme for TV anime Gingitsune
- "LΦVEST" (July 23, 2014), opening theme for TV anime Love Stage!!
- "Amazing the World (アメイジング ザ ワールド)" (November 5, 2014), first ending theme for TV anime Gundam Build Fighters Try
- "Kyokugen Dreamer (極限Dreamer Limit Dreamer)" (January 28, 2015), opening theme for TV anime Yoru no Yatterman
- "Ambivalence (アンビバレンス)" (April 8, 2015), second ending theme for season 3 of TV anime Kuroko no Basket
- "Naked Dive" (January 27, 2016), opening theme for TV anime Musaigen no Phantom World
- "ROUGH DIAMONDS" (July 27, 2016), opening theme for season 2 of Food Wars!: Shokugeki no Soma
- "Reason Living" (October 26, 2016), second opening theme for season 2 of Bungo Stray Dogs.
  - Ranked as 9th best theme song by Newtype magazine in 2017.
- "MYSTERIUM" (July 26, 2017), opening theme for TV anime Vatican Kiseki Chousakan
- "GIFTED" (August 29, 2018), opening theme for TV anime Muhyo & Roji's Bureau of Supernatural Investigation
- "Wright Left" (July 3, 2019), episode 12 insert theme song for season 3 of TV anime Bungo Stray Dogs'
- "One Wish" (November 27, 2019), ending theme song for TV anime Special 7: Special Crime Investigation Unit
- "Wake Up Decker!" (July 9, 2022), opening theme song for TV Tokusatsu Ultraman Decker
- "TRUE STORY" (January 5, 2023) opening theme for season 4 of Bungo Stray Dogs'

=== Mini-albums ===
- Ultraman Decker
- NATURAL HIGH DREAMER (October 8, 2014)
- SOUL (February 2, 2017)
- Yakusoku no Sora (約束の空 Sky of Promise) (July 3, 2019)

=== Albums ===
- Discovery Collection (July 22, 2015)
- 1/1 (January 24, 2018)
- With You (January 27, 2021)
