= Jug (disambiguation) =

A jug is a type of container commonly used to hold a liquid.

Jug may also refer to:

== Places ==
- The Jug, an island in West Virginia, United States
- Jug Rock, a natural geological formation outside of Shoals, Indiana, United States
- Jug II, a city district of Osijek, Croatia
  - Jug Sport Hall, an indoor arena in Jug II
- Cepotina, a Serbian Army base also known as Jug

== Slang ==
- Jugs, a slang term for women's breasts, especially large ones
- Jug, a slang term for prison
- Jug, New Zealand and Australian term for an electric kettle

== People ==
- Jug (nickname)
- Jug Suraiya, Indian journalist, author and columnist
- Jug (surname)

== Other uses ==
- Jug (album), by jazz saxophonist Gene Ammons
- Jug (dog), a crossbreed between a Jack Russell terrier and a pug
- Jug (instrument), used for rhythmic bass accompaniment
- Jug fishing, a method of fishing that uses lines suspended from floating jugs
- Jug Tavern, a historic structure in Ossining, New York, United States
- Jug wine, a term used for inexpensive table wine
- VK Jug, a water polo club from Dubrovnik, Croatia
- Jug, a nickname for the P-47 Thunderbolt fighter aircraft

== See also ==
- Yug (disambiguation)
- Juggs, a U.S. soft-core pornographic magazine
- Jugging
