= Dark Ages =

Dark Ages or Dark Age may refer to:

== History and sociology ==
- Dark Ages (historiography), the use of the term Dark Ages colloquially and by some historians.
  - Early Middle Ages (5th–10th centuries), the centuries after the fall of the Western Roman Empire
    - Saeculum obscurum ("dark age/century"), a period in the history of the papacy during the first two-thirds of the 10th century
  - Byzantine Dark Ages (7th–8th centuries), period of large-scale transformation, but obscure due to lack of sources, in Byzantine history
  - List of common misconceptions about the Middle Ages § History of the "Dark Ages" misconception
- Irish Dark Age, a period of apparent economic and cultural stagnation in late pre-historic Ireland, lasting from c. 100 BC to c. AD 300
- Parthian Dark Age, a period of three decades in the history of Parthian Empire
- Societal collapse, a situation in which a society collapses
  - Late Bronze Age collapse (c. 1200 BC–1150 BC)
    - Greek Dark Ages (c. 1100 BC–750 BC), a period in the history of ancient Greece and Anatolia after the Late Bronze Age collapse
- Dark ages of Khmer/Cambodia
  - Post-Angkor period (1431–1863)
  - Cambodian genocide (1975–1979), the systematic persecution and killing of Cambodian people by the Khmer Rouge
- Digital dark age, a future time when it might not be possible to read historical digital documents

== Arts and entertainment ==
=== Film and television ===
- Dark Age (film), a 1987 Australian film directed by Arch Nicholson
- Dark Ages (TV series), a 1999 British sitcom
- The Dark Ages: An Age of Light, a 2012 British documentary television series
- Miracle Workers: Dark Ages, the 2020 season of Miracle Workers
- "The Dark Age" (Buffy the Vampire Slayer), a 1997 television episode
- "The Dark Age" (Bungo Stray Dogs), a 2016 television episode
- "The Dark Age" (Lighthouse), a 2023 talk show episode
- "The Dark Ages" (Roseanne), a 1992 television episode
- "The Dark Age", a 2026 episode of Animator vs. Animation

=== Games ===
- Dark Ages (1991 video game), a platform game by Apogee Software
- Dark Ages (1999 video game), an MMORPG by KRU Interactive
- Dark Age (collectible card game), a 1996 collectible card game
- Dark Ages, a 2012 expansion for the deck-building card game Dominion
- Doom: The Dark Ages, a 2025 video game

=== Literature ===
- Dark Age (novel), a 2019 novel by Pierce Brown
- The Dark Age (series), a 2002–2005 novel trilogy by Mark Chadbourn
- Dark Age of Comic Books (1986–late 1990s), a period in the American comics industry
- The Dark Age, a four-book maxiseries of the comics series Astro City

=== Music ===
- Dark Age (band), a German metal band 1995–2013

==== Albums ====
- Dark Ages (album), by Soulfly, or the title song, 2005
- The Dark Ages, an EP by Andrea Parker, 2001
- The Dark Ages, an EP Bedhead, 1996
- Little Dark Age by MGMT

==== Songs ====
- "Dark Age" (song), by the Hippos, 1988
- "Dark Ages", by Jethro Tull from Stormwatch, 1979
- "Dark Ages", by NoMeansNo from Small Parts Isolated and Destroyed, 1988
- "Dark Ages", by Scar the Martyr from Scar the Martyr, 2013
- "Dark Ages", by Yngwie Malmsteen from Trilogy, 1986

== Other uses ==
- Dark Ages (cosmology), in Big Bang cosmology, a period ending roughly 150 million to 800 million years after the Big Bang, after which stars began to form
- "Dark Era", a hypothetical age of the universe in the far future

== See also ==
- Golden Age (disambiguation)
- Middle Ages (disambiguation)
- Kalyug (disambiguation), the Dark Ages in Hinduism
