= Bungo Stray Dogs season 4 =

Bungo Stray Dogs
- Season 4
- Season four's key visual
- No. of episodes: 13

Release
- Original network: Tokyo MX
- Original release: January 4 – March 29, 2023

Season chronology
- ← Previous; Season 3 Next → Season 5

The fourth season of the Bungo Stray Dogs anime television series is produced by Bones, directed by Takuya Igarashi and written by Yōji Enokido. Based on the manga series of the same name written by Kafka Asagiri and illustrated by Sango Harukawa, the story focuses on individuals with supernatural abilities who use their powers for various purposes, including running businesses, solving mysteries, and completing missions assigned by the mafia. The series primarily follows the members of the "Armed Detective Agency" and their daily lives.

A fourth season anime was announced on November 7, 2021, and premiered on January 4, 2023, concluding on March 29, 2023. The opening theme "True Story" was performed by Screen Mode, while Luck Life performed the ending theme "Shirushi" (しるし).

== Episodes ==
No. overall	No. in season	Title (Note: English translated titles are taken from Crunchyroll.)	Directed by	Storyboarded by	Original release date
38	1	"The Lone Swordsman and the Famous Detective"; Transliteration: "Ko Kenshi to Meitantei" (Japanese: 孤剣士と名探偵)	Takayuki Yamamoto	Takuya Igarashi	January 4, 2023
Several years before the beginning of the series, a former military man named Yukichi Fukuzawa investigates a scene of crime involving murder. Initially, he suspects that the young hitman Sakunosuke Oda as the culprit but the researcher investigating the area turns out to be the culprit and is killed by Oda. Fukuzawa meets the young intelligent detective Ranpo Edogawa who has surprised him with his highly developed intelligence when solving cases and agrees to help him find a job. As Ranpo deduces from Fukuzawa's appearance that he is a former war soldier who killed several people in a previous conflict, Fukuzawa is stressed by remembering his past but still decides to help Ranpo with a job. In the next case, Ranpo investigates death threats sent towards an actor from a play.
39	2	"The Day Is a Dream, The Night Is Real"; Transliteration: "Hiru wa Yume, Yoru zo Utsutsu" (Japanese: 晝は夢、夜ぞ現)	Akiyo Ohashi	Takuya Igarashi	January 11, 2023
In the play, Fukuzawa notices that Ranpo is tired of being the only intelligent person so he convinces him that he possesses a supernatural talent that makes him standout within society and that he should only use his skills for the jobs. In the play, the leading actor apparently dies and Ranpo asks Fukuzawa to calm the viewers. Ranpo reveals a suspicious man to be a possible criminal but ends up saying that there was no death as the leading actor faked his death. In the aftermath, Ranpo takes a liking to Fukuzawa.
40	3	"The Secret Founding of the Detective Agency"; Transliteration: "Tantei-sha Setsuritsu Hiwa" (Japanese: 探偵社設立秘話)	Sayaka Morikawa	Takuya Igarashi	January 18, 2023
Apparently en route to the police station, Mitamura praises Ranpo's deduction skills and Fukuzawa's prowess in solving the recent case. However, Ranpo claims that Mitamura still doubts him possessing an ability, so he offers to answer the cop's questions until he runs out of queries to prove that he is truly gifted. As a start, Ranpo correctly deduces that they are not heading to the police station, which Mitamura dismisses can be easily observed. Ranpo then urges him to ask anything related to the recent incident, to which Mitamura asks how the suited man restrained in the theater was captured. The detective reveals that someone abducted the man using a rug and organic solvent, whom Mitamura guesses must be the playwright Kurahashi, but Ranpo states that the latter must have been already killed even before the performance. He also points out that the entire project is an elaborate ploy all to abduct the suited man, afterwards slyly calling out Mitamura for reeking of organic solvent.
41	4	"A Perfect Murder and Murderer (Part 1)"; Transliteration: "Kanpekina Satsujin to Satsujin-sha (Sono Ichi)" (Japanese: 完璧な殺人と殺人者（其の一）)	Masatoyo Takada	Yoshiyuki Asai	January 25, 2023
42	5	"A Perfect Murder and Murderer (Part 2)"; Transliteration: "Kanpekina Satsujin to Satsujin-sha (Sono Ni)" (Japanese: 完璧な殺人と殺人者（其の二）)	Takanori Yano	Taizo Yoshida	February 1, 2023
43	6	"Tragic Sunday"; Transliteration: "Higekinaru Nichiyōbi" (Japanese: 悲劇なる日曜日)	Takayuki Yamamoto	Yoshiyuki Asai	February 8, 2023
One month after the Cannibalism incident, Fukuzawa and the Armed Detective Agency are awarded by the Ministry of Justice for ensuring the safety and protecting Yokohama during the fall of Moby Dick. Meanwhile, Kunikida trains Atsushi in physical combat.
44	7	"Dogs Hunt Dogs"	Kōta Mori	Yoshiyuki Asai	February 15, 2023
45	8	"You, A Child of Sin; I, A Child of Sin"; Transliteration: "Kimi mo Tsumi no Ko, Ware mo Tsumi no Ko" (Japanese: 君も罪の子、我も罪の子)	Akiyo Ohashi	Hiroshi Hara	February 22, 2023
46	9	"A Dream of Butterflies"; Transliteration: "Chō o Yumemu" (Japanese: 蝶を夢む)	Sayaka Morikawa	Kotaro Tamura	March 1, 2023
Port Mafia boss Mori wants Yosano to join them in exchange for assisting the Detective Agency through their crisis. Yosano reveals why she would rather not.
47	10	"In Lament of My Wingless Body"; Transliteration: "Hanenaki Mi no Kanashiki ka na" (Japanese: 翅無き身の悲しきかな)	Takanori Yano	Taizo Yoshida	March 8, 2023
48	11	"Jailbreak"; Transliteration: "Datsugokuki" (Japanese: 脱獄記)	Masatoyo Takada	Kotaro Tamura	March 15, 2023
49	12	"Bungo Hound Dogs"; Transliteration: "Bungō Haundo Doggusu" (Japanese: 文豪ハウンドドッグス)	Takayuki Yamamoto	Nobu Horimoto	March 22, 2023
50	13	"Skyfall"	Takanori Yano & Takahiro Hasui	Kotaro Tamura	March 29, 2023

== Home media release ==
=== Japanese ===
Kadokawa Corporation (Japan – Region 2/A)
Volume	Episodes	Release date	Ref.
17	38–40	March 24, 2023	
18	41–43	April 26, 2023	
19	44–46	May 24, 2023	
20	47–50	June 28, 2023	
