= Bungo Stray Dogs season 3 =

Bungo Stray Dogs
- Season 3
- Season three's key visual
- No. of episodes: 12

Release
- Original network: Tokyo MX
- Original release: April 12 – June 28, 2019

Season chronology
- ← Previous; Season 2 Next → Season 4

The third season of the Bungo Stray Dogs anime television series is produced by Bones, directed by Takuya Igarashi and written by Yōji Enokido. It is based on the manga series of the same name written by Kafka Asagiri and illustrated by Sango Harukawa. The first three episodes of the season are based on a light novel prequel that shows how Osamu Dazai met Chuya Nakahara while working for the Port Mafia, while the remaining episodes follow the manga's storyline with the Detective Agency and the Port Mafia being manipulated by a group known as Rats in the House of the Dead.

The third season aired from April 12 to June 28, 2019. It was broadcast on Tokyo MX, TVA, KBS, SUN, BS11, and Wowow. Granrodeo performed the third seasons' opening theme "Setsuna no Ai," and Luck Life performed the third seasons' ending theme "Lily." For the final episode, Screen Mode provided the theme song "Wright Left".

== Episodes ==
No. overall	No. in season	Title (Note: English translated titles are taken from Crunchyroll.)	Directed by	Storyboarded by	Original release date
26	1	"Dazai, Chuuya, Fifteen Years Old"; Transliteration: "Dazai, Chūya, Jūgo-sai" (Japanese: 太宰、中也、十五歳)	Ikurō Satō	Takuya Igarashi	April 12, 2019
Ango narrates a story of the worst bloodshed incident in Yokohama, where 88 corpses were produced. Prior to the events of the first season, eight years ago, Mori has just taken leadership of the Port Mafia, having secretly killed his predecessor who was showing self-destructive tendencies. Dazai acts as Mori's witness. A year passes, and Dazai is sent to examine strange rumours of the Predecessor's revival within a Suribachi City, a city built in a crater produced after a massive explosion eight years ago. Suribachi is also currently an area of conflict between the Mafia and 3 other organisations: Gernhardt Secret Society (GSS), Takasekai and the Sheep, a group of juveniles. There, 15-year-old Chuya appears to battle Dazai as the leader of the Sheep, believing that the Port Mafia is looking into the rumour of 'Arahabaki'. Arahabaki was supposedly summoned by the hatred of a tortured soldier and caused the explosion of Suribachi City eight years ago. They fight briefly before witnessing the Predecessor appear before their very eyes. Chuya is then captured and brought to the Mafia headquarters. Mori decides to have him and Dazai work together, with the Sheep members' lives on the line, to uncover the truth behind the seemingly connected rumours of the Predecessor and Arahabaki.
27	2	"God of Fire"; Transliteration: "Aragami wa Ima" (Japanese: 荒神は今)	Takahiro Hasui	Takuya Igarashi	April 19, 2019
Chuya and Dazai head to interview a Mafia Executive, Rando, who is the only surviving witness to an explosion similar to Arahabaki's and assumed to be made by the Predecessor. Battling members of the GSS along the way, Rando vividly describes the beast-like entity he saw, allowing Dazai to infer the identity of the culprit. At an arcade, Chuya bumps into two Sheep members, who insist that he use his ability to fight the Port Mafia until Dazai steps in, releasing the hostages and telling them that Chuya can freely use his power, and that he is now affiliated with the Mafia. The two bet to see who can find the culprit first, with Dazai confronting Rando alone later that day, as his description matches details that would have been there in the past, but could not be there in the present, concluding that Rando had seen the first explosion caused by Arahabaki and the destruction of Suribachi City. Chuya then barges in, having arrived at the same conclusion, but from the fact that ever other witness saw the Predecessor but only Rando saw the true Arahabaki. Rando confesses that he was trying to find Arahabaki, which was discovered by the Japanese government eight years ago and sealed, to use its power. At that, Chuya reveals that he is Arahabaki.
28	3	"Only a Diamond Can Polish a Diamond"; Transliteration: "Daiya wa Daiya-de Shika" (Japanese: ダイヤはダイヤでしか)	Ikurō Satō	Takuya Igarashi	April 26, 2019
Rando uses his ability to create a dimension under his control outside the normal laws of physics to prevent Chuya's ability from taking effect, revealing that he can also reanimate one corpse at a time within that space as a fighting slave. He proceeds to battle Chuya while the Predecessor appears to battle Dazai. Together, Dazai and Chuya manage to defeat Rando, who reveals his true identity as a foreign spy named Arthur Rimbaud who came to Japan eight years ago with his partner to inspect the reported containment of Arahabaki by the Japanese government. When the two of them fought over its power, his partner was killed and Rando, cornered by the military, attempted to reach out and store Arahabaki within his dimension as his weapon. The release of Arahabaki then formed the explosion. Rando's last words are a guess that Chuya isn't actually the deity itself, but more of a human vessel to control its power, and urges him to be proud of his strength as a human. The job finished, Chuya returns to the Sheep, only for them to try and kill him, having allied with the GSS. Dazai discovers an injured Chuya, having escaped, and approaches him with an offer from Mori to join them to kill their enemies, in exchange for the Sheep members' lives being spared. With no choice, he accepts and decides to join the Port Mafia of his own free will after Mori earns his respect, and is gifted Rando's old hat as a symbol of his membership. Seven years later, Ango is making a note of these events and mentions that Rando's partner was actually still alive, and how Chuya would confront him soon.
29	4	"My Ill Deeds Are the Work of God"; Transliteration: "Toga Ataeru wa Kami no Gō" (Japanese: 咎与うるは神の業)	Daisuke Chiba	Michio Fukuda	May 3, 2019
The person revealed to be behind the bugging of Moby Dick's remote control and its destruction is a man named Fyodor Dostoevsky, the leader of a pirate organisation known as the Rats of the House of the Dead. Having been captured by Ace, a Port Mafia executive infamous for his brutal treatment of his subordinates and frightening gambling skills, Ace secretly offers Fyodor a chance to be a part of his fifty-men crew. To further force Fyodor he reveals his ability, Madness in the King of Jewels, allows him to change his subordinates' remaining lifespan for gems of equal value, provided they have on a special, irremovable jewelled collar. However, Fyodor reveals to a subordinate, after Ace has left, that his ability allows him to control consciousness and space. When Ace returns, the two decide to play a game where they guess whether the card next drawn will be higher or lower than the previous one, with Fyodor winning by a landslide. Ace confronts him, deducing that this room is an ability space created by Fyodor in his head, resulting in the cards being freely manipulated, the communicator broken, the door being unable to open, and the unmoving clock behind them. However, as the subordinate finds Ace hanged from the ceiling, Fyodor reveals that he made it appear to be an ability space by breaking the communicator and clock with wine, and stuffing bits of cork into the keyhole. He then kills the subordinate using his real ability, Crime and Punishment, and steals a compiled list containing all the abilities of the Port Mafia members.
30	5	"Slap the Stick & Addict"	Takahiro Hasui	Takahiro Hasui	May 10, 2019
As things have died down after the battle with the Guild, the Armed Detective Agency relaxes at a café on the first floor of their office building. Atsushi reports that criminal organisations have arisen to find the rumoured Guild's fortune and how he encountered Lucy the other day. This leads to one such organisation, The Park, to attempt to wring information out from the Agency by ransacking the café and tearing out the manager's fingernails, prompting a fierce retaliation from the Agency members. After getting revenge, the manager reveals that he has employed Lucy to be one of his staff members, much to Atsushi's surprise. Like the Agency, the Port Mafia relaxes after the incident. Higuchi espies Akutagawa going home with a beautiful young woman one day and plots to figure out her identity. Meanwhile, Kunikida brings Atsushi to see Katai Tayama, a former Agency member whose ability "Futon" allows him to control electronic devices without touching them and process information a dozen times faster than normal humans, in order to find the identity behind the person who bugged the Moby Dick control remote. However, Katai is revealed to have fallen in love with a woman that is, coincidentally, the same woman Higuchi is trailing, and is unable to use his ability due to lovesickness. Higuchi and Katai both give chase when they see the woman, revealed to be Gin, who is also Akutagawa's younger sister. Rejected, Katai works through his heartbreak to help the Agency find their information.
31	6	"Herurisu!"; Transliteration: "Sono Ichi『Herurisu!』" (Japanese: 其の一『ヘルリス！』)	Yoshiyuki Asai	Yoshiyuki Asai	May 17, 2019
31	6	"Portrait of a Father"; Transliteration: "Sono Ni『Chichi no Shōzō』" (Japanese: 其の二『父の肖像』)	Yoshiyuki Asai	Yoshiyuki Asai	May 17, 2019
Atsushi and Kyouka are tasked to investigate a mysterious briefcase in one of the yachts at the city's port. Lucy, who has held a grudge against Atsushi for not coming to save her when she let him escape the Moby Dick, deliberately withholds information regarding its location and causes the pair to go on a wild goose chase, with Atsushi almost drowning. Finally with Lucy's cooperation, the three realise the briefcase to contain classified information detailing the deaths of Kyouka's parents, who had been government spies and hence did not have details of their deaths disclosed to the public or Kyouka herself. Her parents were killed in an ambush attack by an ability-user that could control minds. In an attempt to protect their daughter, her mother, who was the wielder of Demon Snow at that time, ordered it to kill herself and passed on the ability to Kyouka. Kyouka reconciles with the ability she once hated, now with the understanding that it is a representation of her parents' love. It is later shown that Koyou was the one who had planted the briefcase as a gift for Kyouka celebrating her formal appointment into the agency. Atsushi is tasked to investigate a car crash in the streets, with the deceased victim revealed to be the orphanage Headmaster that inflicted great trauma on him in his childhood years. As Atsushi struggles with confronting his past struggles and conflicting emotions, he realises that the Headmaster's deeds, while wicked and inhumane, had equipped him with the necessary skills to survive as an ability-user that was unable to control his power while young, being something remotely of a "father-figure" to him. It is revealed that the Headmaster, after having seen Atsushi's face in the newspapers from the Moby Dick explosion incident, had arrived in Yokohama with the intention of congratulating him with flowers.
32	7	"Fitzgerald Rising"; Transliteration: "Fittsujerarudo Raijingu" (Japanese: フィッツジェラルド・ライジング)	Ikurō Satō	Michio Fukuda	May 24, 2019
Louisa finds Fitzgerald amongst the slums of Yokohama, having lost his will to live following his fall from the Moby Dick, left without a single penny or friend. She manages to cheer him up and let him regain his former self, with Fitzgerald intending on finding a new base of operations for a new Guild to be reformed. He sets his sights on one of the skyscrapers of Yokohama, a building that houses the headquarters of 'Eyes of God', a powerful face recognition technology and security camera developer company. Using his business abilities and ridiculous confidence, Fitzgerald involves himself in a court case where one of their engineers was accused of killing a man, deliberately seeing through the fraud and earning himself the position of CEO.
33	8	"The Masked Assassin"; Transliteration: "Kamen no Ansatsusha" (Japanese: 仮面ノ暗殺者)	Daisuke Chiba	Yoshiyuki Asai	May 31, 2019
A former Guild assassin starts attacking people. He inflicts both Fukuzawa and Mori with a curse that drains their lifespan. Dazai realizes that Fyodor is controlling this person and learns that Fyodor is searching for a book that will allow him to rewrite humanity at his will. Before leaving, Dostoevsky has a man shoot Dazai in order to pass his information to the Agency. As a result, the Agency and Port Mafia are forced to fight one another as the winner will find a cure to heal their superiors. Kunikida replaces the unconscious President and is assisted by Edogawa to provide with strategies to confront the Port Mafia who attack their building.
34	9	"Cannibalism (Part One)"; Transliteration: "Tomogui (Sono Ichi)" (Japanese: 共喰い（其の一）)	Takanori Yano	Taizo Yoshida	June 7, 2019
The Agency leaves behind Tanizaki as a bargaining chip with the Port Mafia to capture the Cannibalism gift bearer, Pushkin, to neutralize the condition of both the heads. However, when Atsushi and Kunikida go after him, they are hindered by armed kids, and while Atsushi goes after Pushkin, Kunikida stays behind to save a child with grenades on her neck. While Kunikida fails to save the child, Atsushi manages to capture Pushkin, who turns out to be a fake. The Agency loses their bargaining chip, while the Port Mafia try to make a deal with Tanizaki, who refuses and uses his ability to try to kill the Port Mafia's head. However he fails when Ozaki attacks with Golden Demon, but is rescued by Kyoka. The duo are picked up by the rest of the Agency, who try to find another way to get the Port Mafia head, however Atsushi reminds them of the message that he got from Lucy, who is using Anne's Room to keep the Agency's head safe, to not they are not to fight Port Mafia, but are to keep the city safe.
35	10	"Cannibalism (Part Two)"; Transliteration: "Tomogui (Sono Ni)" (Japanese: 共喰い（其の二）)	Takahiro Hasui	Takahiro Hasui	June 14, 2019
The war between the agency and the mafia continues but Kunikida refuses to take part in this conflict, following the orders of Fukuzawa. Kyoka tries to take Higuchi hostage but she is stopped by Akutagawa. Edogawa engages Chuya in fight and has both of them trapped in a murder novel created by Poe. In order to reduce the casualties of the current war, Fukuzawa and Mori fight one-on-one.
36	11	"Cannibalism (Part Three)"; Transliteration: "Tomogui (Sono San)" (Japanese: 共喰い（其の三）)	Ikurō Satō	Yoshiyuki Asai	June 21, 2019
Fukuzawa and Mori attempt to kill each other while reminscing about their past. Before anybody is able to finish their rival, they are stopped by their superior, Natsume Soseki. Dazai then makes Atsushi and Akutagawa work together once more to infiltrate into the Rats in the House of the Dead hideout. Despite working together, Akutagawa is inflicted with the same virus that infected Fukuzawa and Mori.
37	12	"Echo"; Transliteration: "Ekō" (Japanese: 回向(ECHO))	Takuya Igarashi	Takuya Igarashi	June 28, 2019
Atsushi and Akutagawa chase after the man with the virus ability, Pushkin, but are interrupted by Fyodor's loyal assistant, Ivan Goncharov. Goncharov uses his ability to manipulate earth to create golems that overwhelm the duo. The two finally work together, with Akutagawa letting Atsushi wear his Rashōmon, combining their abilities to wipe out the enemy. Pushkin, who escapes out of the hideout, is confronted by the members of the Agency and Port Mafia alike. However, it is revealed that Fyodor is far from the hideout, having predicted the circumstances and moved to a rooftop café somewhere else in Yokohama using the music from the radio programmes to signal and give Goncharov orders. Dazai utilises the help of Fitzgerald, who has control over all security cameras in Yokohama, to counterattack, predicting Fyodor's train of thought and arriving with reinforcements from the police and Special Ability Department to arrest Fyodor. After the battle, Atsushi and Akutagawa promise to have a showdown with each other within the next 6 months, each planning to use that time to hone their abilities to the fullest.

== Home media release ==
=== Japanese ===
Kadokawa Corporation (Japan – Region 2/A)
Volume	Episodes	Release date	Ref.
13	26–28	June 21, 2019	
14	29–31	July 24, 2019	
15	32–34	August 23, 2019	
16	35–37	September 25, 2019	
