= Bungo Stray Dogs season 1 =

Bungo Stray Dogs
- Season 1
- Season one's key visual
- No. of episodes: 12

Release
- Original network: Tokyo MX
- Original release: April 7 – June 23, 2016

Season chronology
- Next → Season 2

The first season of the Bungo Stray Dogs anime television series is produced by Bones. It was directed by Takuya Igarashi and written by Yōji Enokido. It is based on the manga series of the same name written by Kafka Asagiri and illustrated by Sango Harukawa. The season focuses on a weretiger named Atsushi Nakajima who joins into the "Armed Detective Agency" who investigate multiple cases while dealing with multiple organizations.

The season aired from April 7 to June 23, 2016, on networks Tokyo MX, Teletama, Chiba TV, tvk, GBS (Gifu Broadcasting), Mie TV, SUN, TVQ, and BS11. Nobuhiro Arai and Hiroshi Kanno served as the chief animation directors, while the former also served as character designer along with Ryō Hirata. A total of six Blu-ray and DVD volumes collected the series from June 24 to November 25, 2016. Funimation released the entire first season on March 6, 2018, while another compilation was released on September 17, 2019. Madman released the season's DVD and Blu-ray on February 20, 2019. Madman Entertainment released the DVD box on February 20, 2019, in Australia.

Taku Iwasaki composed the series' music. The season uses two theme songs: Granrodeo performed the opening theme, titled "Trash Candy", and Luck Life performed the ending theme, titled "Namae wo Yobu yo" (名前を呼ぶよ; lit. 'Call Out The Name').

== Episodes ==
No. overall	No. in season	Title (Note: English translated titles are taken from Crunchyroll.)	Directed by	Storyboarded by	Original release date
1	1	"Fortune Is Unpredictable and Mutable"; Transliteration: "Jinsei Banji Saiō ga Tora" (Japanese: 人生万事塞翁が虎)	Takuya Igarashi	Takuya Igarashi	April 7, 2016
Nakajima Atsushi, a starving, homeless orphan, encounters a man floating down the river who appears to be drowning. Atsushi dives in and rescues the man, who comes to consciousness and introduces himself as the suicidal maniac, Osamu Dazai. Dazai's colleague, Doppo Kunikida yells at Dazai from across the river and ends up treating Atsushi to a meal of chazuke in a tea house. Atsushi discovers that Kunikida and Dazai work for the Armed Detective Agency, an organization of individuals possessing supernatural abilities. Dazai and Kunikida explain that they are searching for a tiger that has been ravaging warehouses and livestock. Atsushi states that the tiger had been following him throughout his traveling, and ends up posing as the bait to help the two agents capture it. Dazai slips Kunikida a note and takes Atsushi to a warehouse. Atsushi explains how he was kicked out of the orphanage to save money, because the tiger had caused the financially poor orphanage a great deal of damage. Dazai concludes that Atsushi is the tiger, or rather that he has a supernatural power to transform into the tiger under moonlight. The full moon is revealed and Atsushi transforms and attacks Dazai, who reveals his special ability: "No Longer Human", which stops all other abilities when he touches a person. He is able to subdue Atsushi. Not long after, Kunikida arrives at the scene with three other agents. Dazai decides to make Atsushi a member of the Armed Detective Agency.
2	2	"A Certain Bomb"; Transliteration: "Aru Bakudan" (Japanese: 或る爆弾)	Ikurō Satō	Takuya Igarashi	April 14, 2016
Atsushi wakes up in a dorm room owned by the Armed Detective Agency. He receives a call from Dazai, who claims that there is an emergency. Atsushi frees Dazai from a suicide attempt in a barrel and decides to look for a different job outside of the agency. Dazai offers to help him and the pair eventually runs into Kunikida who hurries them to a scene of actual emergency. A man had taken a hostage and was threatening to blow up the building. Dazai and Kunikida play rock paper scissors to determine who would be the one to distract the criminal; Kunikida loses rock paper scissors and attempts to negotiate with the man, but is ordered to get on all fours on the table and is unable to do anything else. Atsushi is dressed up as a newspaper boy and successfully distracts the man from the bomb, giving Dazai enough time to subdue the man. The man still presses the detonator and the bomb starts counting down. Desperately, Atsushi throws himself over the bomb to try and protect everyone else. The bomb does not go off; the whole scene was set up as a test to see if Atsushi was the right kind of person to join the Armed Detective Agency. The President of the Agency leaves the decision up to Dazai, who deems Atsushi worthy to be a member of the agency.
3	3	"Yokohama Gangster Paradise"; Transliteration: "Yokohama Gyangusutā Paradaisu" (Japanese: ヨコハマ ギャングスタア パラダヰス)	Kazuhiro Yoneda	Taizo Yoshida	April 21, 2016
Higuchi Ichuyou requests help from the agency to deal with some smugglers. Kunikida warns Atsushi about someone named Akutagawa, a member of Port Mafia. Higuchi reveals herself as a member of Port Mafia and attacks Naomi. Junichirō retaliates with his ability "Light Snow" but is defeated when Akutagawa appears. Atsushi transforms into the tiger and both battle until Dazai shows up and cancels both powers with "No Longer Human" revealing he saw through Higuchi's act. Akutagawa reveals that Dazai used to be a member of Port Mafia.
4	4	"The Tragedy of the Fatalist"; Transliteration: "Unmeironsha no Himi" (Japanese: 運命論者の悲み)	Daigo Yamagishi	Michio Fukuda	April 28, 2016
After the encounter with Akutagawa and Higuchi, Atsushi wakes up on the Agency's clinic where Tanizaki is shown to be healed by their doctor, Yosano Akiko, using unorthodox methods. Kunikida warns Atsushi that the Port Mafia's guerilla squad might enter the Agency and he suggests to do something before things end up in a bad manner while Higuchi calls for the members of the Black Lizard Squad (which consists of Tachihara, Hirotsu, and Gin) to infiltrate the Agency. Atsushi returns to the Agency after a phone call only to see the Agency holed up and goes upstairs in panic, only to reveal that the members have the upper hand against the team to which Atsushi almost cries, thinking that he lost them.
5	5	"Murder on D Street"	Hiroki Ikeshita	Takahiro Ikezoe	May 5, 2016
Atsushi is tasked to assist Ranpo, one of the Agency's most intelligent detectives to a murder case on an embankment that revolves around a dead policewoman and where they also meet Dazai. Using his special ability named "Super Deduction", Ranpo reveals that she wasn't killed by the mafia and it is rather a copycat crime committed by a police officer on the scene. The end of the episode marks the story of how the murderer got bribed by a corrupt diet member to kill the policewoman and how Ranpo solved the case with his pure intelligence along with glasses which indicates that he doesn't have a supernatural ability.
6	6	"The Azure Messenger"; Transliteration: "Ao no Shito" (Japanese: 蒼の使徒)	Yoshiyuki Asai	Takuya Igarashi	May 12, 2016
An episode coming from the first light novel: Dazai Osamu's Entrance Exam which revolves around a series of cases involving the Azure King where the usual victims are tourists taking a specific cab and never to be seen again by the public. Rokuzou, an orphan hacker who is helping Kunikida, validates a tip, and Kunikida, dragging Atsushi and Dazai in this case, go to the location where the victims are. There, they are able to save one of the victims, Sasaki Nobuko from almost drowning in a water tank. However, they are unable to save the others locked within a gas chamber, due to the risk of getting poisoned themselves. Kunikida figures out that the taxi driver has been an accessory, and they manage to hand him over to the police.
7	7	"Love for the Disease Called Ideals"; Transliteration: "Risō to Iu Yamai wo Aisu" (Japanese: 理想という病を愛す)	Ikurō Satō	Takuya Igarashi	May 19, 2016
After getting a notification about a bomb being planted, Kunikida, Dazai and Atsushi set off to locate it. They get help from Rokuzou, Ranpo and the President in finding the location, but are interrupted from stopping the bomb from setting off by a man having the power of numbers and his partner. However, Kunikida and Dazai's partnership proves be superior and they are able to stop the blast from happening. Later, when Kunikida goes to the graves of the people who died, Sasaki also visits, claiming her former partner was also a man of ideals, but they parted because he died. Dazai calls Kunikida to a place where he claims that there is another mastermind behind the crimes. Dazai mentions that he has lured the mastermind by mailing them, only to see Rokuzou enter. However, it is quickly clarified that Rokuzou is there only because he hacked the mails, and the real mastermind enters short after. Rokuzou pushes Kinukida out of the way to save him from the mastermind's bullets but gets shot himself. The mastermind lowers her gun, claiming that Dazai can't shoot her now, since that would be using excessive force, in reply, he hands over the gun to Rokuzou, who shoots her to venge his father's death.
8	8	"Teaching Them To Kill; Then To Die"; Transliteration: "Hito wo Koroshite Shine yo Tote" (Japanese: 人を殺して死ねよとて)	Kazuhiro Yoneda	Takahiro Ikezoe	May 26, 2016
A normal day starts in the Agency when Atsushi asks to where Dazai went, not knowing that he was kidnapped by the mafia's newest assassin, Izumi Kyouka. Atsushi is then dragged to Yosano's shopping trip which ends with both of them aboard a train, with the doctor fascinated on his regenerative ability after the incident to Rashomon biting his leg only for an explosion to happen, which Kaiji Motojirou orchestrates. While Yosano fights with the bomber, Atsushi meets Kyouka with her terrifying ability called "Demon Snow" which allows her to control a phantom through a recipient in her phone. In summary, Atsushi won only to find out that Kyouka is a suicide bomber and promptly jumps out off the train, only for him to rip off the bomb vest and save the girl in the end while Yosano beats Kaiji and even "healed" him.
9	9	"The Beauty Is Quiet Like a Stone Statue"; Transliteration: "Utsukushiki Hito wa Sabi to Shite Sekizō no Gotoku" (Japanese: うつくしき人は寂として石像の如く)	Hiroki Ikeshita	Taizo Yoshida	June 2, 2016
Now that Kyouka has been saved by the Agency, Kunikida reminds Atsushi that the girl has killed 35 people and is currently being wanted by the government. Nonetheless, Atsushi still treats Kyouka to a lot of places where she wants to go and even earns a rabbit stuff toy for her. Once they are done, Kyouka immediately heads to the police station much to Atsushi's reluctance but before he could even respond, Akutagawa stabs him with his ability and takes Kyouka by himself. Meanwhile, Dazai is still locked up in the Mafia's torture room in chains, promptly taunting Akutagawa that Atsushi is a better student than him in the middle of the episode. Dazai is visited by an executive and his former partner, Chūya Nakahara. After the two exchange hostile pleasantries, Chūya asks why Dazai let himself be caught, but Dazai feigns to have any other schemes other than awaiting his execution. In the end, Chūya cuts off his shackles and demands to fight him.
10	10	"Rashoumon and the Tiger"; Transliteration: "Rashōmon to Tora" (Japanese: 羅生門と虎)	Daigo Yamagishi	Takahiro Ikezoe	June 9, 2016
Dazai has a face-off with his ex-partner, Chūya, as Chūya attempts to uncover Dazai's true intentions for letting himself get captured. Meanwhile, Kunikida then locates Atsushi, while Kyōka gives him the chance to escape after she detonates explosives to sink the vessel. Kunikida urges Atsushi to jump and leave the girl behind, thinking that they cannot always save others. However, Atsushi steals his resolve and rushes to save her, believing that she, like how the Agency once took him in, can still be given a second chance to live a life beyond killing. Moments before Akutagawa finishes off Kyōka, Atsushi saves her and lays her at the side. Atsushi and Akutagawa finally face off. The weretiger initially lands attacks on Akutagawa, but Rashōmon's devoured space is almost impregnable. Nevertheless, Atsushi's repetitive attacks on the devoured space allow him to find its weakness. Despite Akutagawa switching to a long-range strategy to avoid contact with Atsushi, the latter lands a crucial attack on the mafioso. Akutagawa recalls his past arduous training with Dazai, triggering him to voice out his animosity towards Atsushi once again. Akutagawa continuously inflicts heavy attacks on him, but Atsushi's regeneration allows him to survive Rashōmon's assaults. Akutagawa remains far away from Atsushi, but the latter uses his tiger's tail to trap Akutagawa in mid-air. As Atsushi launches an attack, Akutagawa uses his devoured space, but Atsushi breaks it and penetrates through, plunging the mafioso into the water. Kyōka awakens and rescues Atsushi from the sinking vessel. As an explosion on the vessel goes off, Kunikida catches the two in his boat, thinking about how Atsushi did a job well done.
11	11	"First, an Unsuitable Profession for Her"; Transliteration: "Sono Ichi『Kanojo ni Mukanai Shokugyō』" (Japanese: 其の一『彼女には向かない職業』)	Sayaka Morikawa	Taizo Yoshida	June 16, 2016
11	11	"Second, an Ecstatic Detective Agency"; Transliteration: "Sono Ni『Uchōten Tanteisha』" (Japanese: 其の二『有頂天探偵社』)	Sayaka Morikawa	Taizo Yoshida	June 16, 2016
12	12	"Borne Back Ceaselessly into the Past"; Transliteration: "Taemanaku Kako e Oshimodosare nagara" (Japanese: たえまなく過去へ押し戻されながら)	Ikurō Satō	Takahiro Ikezoe	June 23, 2016

== Home media release ==
=== Japanese ===
Kadokawa Corporation (Japan – Region 2/A)
Volume	Episodes	Release date	Ref.
1	1–2	June 24, 2016	
2	3–4	July 29, 2016	
3	5–6	August 26, 2016	
4	7–8	September 30, 2016	
5	9–10	October 28, 2016	
6	11–12	November 25, 2016	

=== English ===
Crunchyroll, LLC (North America – Region 1/A)
Title	Episodes	Release date	Ref.
Season 1	1–12	March 6, 2018	
Seasons 1 & 2	1–25	September 17, 2019	
Seasons 1–3	1–37	September 17, 2019	
