= Bungo Stray Dogs season 2 =

Bungo Stray Dogs
- Season 2
- Season two's key visual
- No. of episodes: 12 + OVA

Release
- Original network: Tokyo MX
- Original release: October 6 – December 22, 2016

Season chronology
- ← Previous; Season 1 Next → Season 3

The second season of the Bungo Stray Dogs anime television series is produced by Bones, directed by Takuya Igarashi and written by Yōji Enokido. It is based on the manga series of the same name written by Kafka Asagiri and illustrated by Sango Harukawa. The first four episodes of the season are based on a light novel detailing Osamu Dazai's past in the mafia, while the remaining episodes follow the manga's storyline with the Armed Detective Agency in their fights against the Port Mafia and The Guild, who wish to take their member Atsushi Nakajima.

The second season aired from October 6 to December 22, 2016. It was collected in a total of six Blu-ray and DVD volumes in Japan from December 23, 2016, to May 26, 2017. An original video animation was bundled with the 13th limited edition manga volume, which was released on August 4, 2017. Funimation released the series in North America on September 4, 2018 A collection of the first and second seasons was released in North America on September 17, 2019. Madman Entertainment released the series in Australia on February 20, 2019.

Screen Mode sung the opening theme titled "Reason Living" while Luck Life once again sung the ending theme titled "Kaze ga Fuku Machi" (風が吹く街, lit. 'Town Where Wind Blows').

== Episodes ==
No. overall	No. in season	Title (Note: English translated titles are taken from Crunchyroll.)	Directed by	Storyboarded by	Original release date
13	1	"The Dark Age"; Transliteration: "Kuro no Jidai" (Japanese: 黒の時代)	Yoshiyuki Asai	Takuya Igarashi	October 6, 2016
Four years ago, a group of three friends used to drink together at a bar called Lupin's. These three men: Dazai, Sakanosuke Oda, and Ango Sakaguchi, were members of the Port Mafia, when Dazai was a feared executive, Oda a low-ranking member known for hardly ever killing others with his gun, and Ango an intelligence officer. However, these days are soon torn apart, with only a photograph to remember this soon after, as Ango disappears mysteriously and Oda is sent to find him. Oda locates Ango's residence at a hotel and finds a safe hidden in the ceiling tiles containing an old model of a gun -- a Graugeist -- while narrowly avoiding an attempt on his life. Meanwhile, Dazai uncovers an organisation known as "Mimic" with the Graugeist model as its members' emblem, threatening to destroy the Port Mafia. Meeting up later, Dazai recalls the night at the bar, when Ango explained that he just returned from clinching a deal, and deduces that his words were a lie.
14	2	"Nowhere to Return"; Transliteration: "Modorenai Basho" (Japanese: 戻れない場所)	Hiroki Ikeshita	Takuya Igarashi	October 13, 2016
Oda visits a group of orphans he provides for living in a curry shop. There, Dazai concludes that Mimic is an overseas organisation of gifted individuals that came running from Europe to Japan after being pursued by an English secret organisation The Order of the Clock Tower, and that a storage unit raided by them had its passcode leaked by Ango. Oda recalls the first time he and Dazai met Ango at an accounting facility in the Port Mafia headquarters as he tries to find information related to him, discovering that Ango went to Europe 2 years ago to negotiate a deal and possibly decided to become a double agent at that time. He then heads to Mimic's base after Dazai confirms their hideout and finds Ango tied up there, with time bombs set up all over the building. Oda rescues Ango and assumes that he was sent by the boss to infiltrate Mimic as a spy for the Port Mafia. Using his ability, Flawless, to read six seconds into the future, they manage to escape the time bomb and Ango reveals that the head of Mimic, a man named Gide, possesses a dangerous ability, and how the Graugeist models all contain remnants of their war victims. However, a ball infused with poison is picked up by Oda, causing him to collapse as he watches Ango run away with the soldiers.
15	3	"A Room Where We Can Someday See the Ocean"; Transliteration: "Itsuka Umi no Mieru Heya de" (Japanese: いつか海の見える部屋で)	Ikurō Satō	Takuya Igarashi	October 20, 2016
Oda wakes up in the Port Mafia headquarters, and relays the events of last night to Dazai. Dazai decides to put Ango's departure with the soldiers, revealed to be a separate group of Special Op Corps, aside and focus on dealing with the remaining members of Mimic. As a rookie Akutagawa is injured by Gide, Oda arrives to help him. Gide insists on fighting Oda to create a battlefield for all of them to die with meaning, as both can use the same predictive ability. Oda refuses as he yearns to become a writer someday after quitting the Port Mafia, after he was once inspired by a man named Natsume Souseki to write the third part of an unfinished series as a young man. Later that evening, the three meet one another at Lupin's again. Dazai reveals Ango's true identity as an agent of the Ministry of Internal Affairs made to monitor the Port Mafia's movements. As Ango leaves for good, he leaves the photograph of the three of them on the table. The next day, Oda is horrified to find the curry shop owner dead and the orphans killed in an explosion.
16	4	"Bungo Stray Dog"; Transliteration: "Bungō Sutorei Doggu" (Japanese: 文豪ストレイドッグ)	Yoshiyuki Asai	Takuya Igarashi	October 27, 2016
Ango facilitates a meeting between the Port Mafia's boss, Mori Ougai, and the Head of the Gifted Special Corps Division, Taneda, requesting for the Port Mafia to dispose of Mimic, in return for a black envelope permitting the Mafia to operate legally as a gifted organisation without fear of suppression from the Division. Dazai, knowing that Oda will surely seek out Gide for vengeance, reveals that he joined the Port Mafia to place himself close to his raw emotions under violence, death, instinct and desire in order to find a reason to live his life. Oda nevertheless heads alone to the enemy base, resigning himself to sacrifice his writer's dream as he resolves to kill Gide. Dazai confronts Mori about how he orchestrated everything including allowing Mimic to enter the country and revealing the orphans' locations just to get that permit, with Oda's life as the tool to defeat Mimic for good. As Dazai rushes to the base alone, he witnesses both Gide and Oda collapse from their injuries. Oda advises Dazai as a friend to keep on living as someone who protects people, since good and bad do not mean a thing to him, and dies in his arms. Two weeks later, Dazai quits the Port Mafia and searches for a new job, landing himself in a position at the Armed Detective Agency.
17	5	"Three Companies Conflict"; Transliteration: "Sansha Teiritsu" (Japanese: 三社鼎立(ていりつ))	Sayaka Morikawa	Hideyo Yamamoto	November 3, 2016
Back in the present, Kyouka attempts her first job delivering information to a court judge, but inadvertently wreaks havoc. They are confronted by Ozaki Kōyou, a Port Mafia executive who intends to take Kyouka back with her, resulting in their two abilities, both in the form of demons, clashing. As Kunikida and Kenji arrive, so do several members of The Guild, who promptly defeat everyone on the scene, but the Agency members manage to escape while taking Kōyou hostage and Kyouka goes missing. It is then implied that Dazai tortured Kōyou for information on the Port Mafia's standing in the three-way conflict between the organisations. The Agency hence decides to move base to a chapel and prepare for battle.
18	6	"The Strategy of Conflict"	Takanori Yano	Taizo Yoshida	November 10, 2016
Two Guild members, Nathaniel Hawthorne and Margaret Mitchell, direct the loading of cargo into a luxury liner, discovering a letter written by Mori within the goods declaring their intention to obliterate the liner, called Zelda, and both their lives. The workers then find Kaiji, who has replaced the cargo in the unloading helicopter with his lemon bombs that subsequently detonate on the liner. As Nathaniel, Margaret and majority of the workers escape to the pier, they are confronted by Akutagawa, who kills everyone on the spot. Meanwhile, at the chapel, the Agency has split into defensive and offensive teams, with the defensive team consisting of Ranpo, Yosano, Fukuzawa and Kenji. Chuuya arrives at the underground railroad tunnel entrance and explains that the Port Mafia has baited two members of The Guild, John Steinbeck and Howard Phillips Lovecraft, with Naomi and Fukuzawa's secretary, Kirako Haruno, inviting the Agency to defeat them.
19	7	"Will of Tycoon"; Transliteration: "Wiru obu Taikūn" (Japanese: ウィル・オブ・タイクーン)	Ikurō Satō	Yoshiyuki Asai	November 17, 2016
As the Agency has evacuated, Naomi and Kirako are currently being housed in a countryside inn surrounded by the forest. John uses his ability to take control of the forest and capture the girls, but is stopped by Junichirō and Kunikida. As Lovecraft restrains them and John traps the girls, Junichirō uses his ability on a truck driver heading their way on the road to make him crash into John and Lovecraft, allowing Naomi and Kirako to jump onto a train heading towards the city. Fukuzawa informs Atsushi and Dazai to meet up with them at the station. On the train, they accidentally bump into a little kid carrying an ominous-looking doll. When Dazai leaves to confront Gin and Higuchi, they reach the station to meet up with Atsushi. The kid bumps into him as well, revealing their arm stabbed with razors to the point where even the slightest bump would hurt them. The kid, a dangerous member of Port Mafia named Kyūsaku Yumeno, or Q, then activates their ability "Dogra Magra", which allows them to control the minds of anyone who has hurt them, be it intentional or unintentional, by ripping their doll apart. Atsushi manages to knock Kirako unconscious but ends up strangling Naomi. As Q manipulates others' minds through hallucinations, Atsushi is once again thrown back into his trauma and cycle of self-pity. Dazai, who initially refused an offer relayed by Higuchi to rejoin the Port Mafia, is told of Q's release and hastens back to stop them. After the events of the day, Kouyou tells Atsushi that Dazai didn't torture her; they made a deal with each other stating that if Dazai were to find and save Kyouka she would wait at the Agency's office, entrusting Kyouka to him. As Dazai meets up Ango to get the Special Operations Division on their side, a car crashes into theirs. Francis attempts to capture Atsushi, only for Kyouka to arrive on the scene.
20	8	"Though the Mind May be Wrong"; Transliteration: "Atama wa Machigau Koto ga Atte mo" (Japanese: 頭は間違うことがあっても)	Sayaka Morikawa	Hiroko Utsumi	November 24, 2016
Kyouka manages to escape with Atsushi, calling the police to prevent any Guild reinforcements. However, the police has received orders to arrest Kyouka, who hasn't been cleared of her charges yet, causing her to be taken into custody and allowing Francis to recapture Atsushi to the Moby Dick, the Guild's main headquarters in the form of a mechanical flying whale. Francis decides to use a contingency plan written by Guild strategist Louisa May Alcott, capturing Q and connecting him to all the trees in Yokohama through John's power. This causes Q's curse to activate on almost a quarter of all the citizens on Yokohama, descending the city into chaos. While held captive, Atsushi meets Lucy again, revealing that he, like her, was an orphan that was also tortured when he was young, earning her sympathy and understanding. Using her ability, she helps him escape with Q's doll, which embodies the root of the curse. Despite being sniped by Guild member Mark Twain and his ability, he manages to get the doll to Dazai and put a stop to the curse.
21	9	"Double Black"; Transliteration: "Futatsu no Kuro" (Japanese: 双(ふた)つの黒)	Takanori Yano	Taizo Yoshida	December 1, 2016
Dazai reveals his previous job as a Port Mafia executive to the rest of the Agency as he arranges a meeting with Mori with the help of Kōyou. Mori reminisces when he killed the previous boss of the Mafia and how Dazai was the only witness. During the meeting between the two bosses of the Port Mafia and the Agency, they eventually tentatively agree to a temporary ceasefire after a minor skirmish. Dazai is sent to recover Q with the help of Chuuya, reviving the old invincible duo nicknamed "Soukoku" (Double Black) of the Port Mafia. As Lovecraft transforms into an eldritch monster that even Dazai cannot nullify, Chuuya reveals the true form of his gravity-controlling gift 'Corruption', which sends him on an uncontrollable rampage while multiplying his power. After defeating Lovecraft, Dazai nullifies Chuuya's ability to prevent him from injuring himself further, displaying their comradeship.
22	10	"Poe and Rampo"; Transliteration: "Sono Ichi『Pō to Ranpo』" (Japanese: 其の一『ポオと乱歩』)	Takebumi Anzai	Michio Fukuda	December 8, 2016
22	10	"Moby Dick, Swimming in the Sky"; Transliteration: "Sono Ni『Ama no Umi o Yuku Hakugei no Arite』" (Japanese: 其の二『天(あま)の海をゆく白鯨のありて』)	Takebumi Anzai	Michio Fukuda	December 8, 2016
Rampo is challenged to a riddle game by Edgar Allan Poe, the Guild's architect. Poe promises that if Rampo solves the mystery, he will give the Agency an envelope detailing the Moby Dick's structure and the Guild's weaknesses. He then uses his ability to send Rampo and Yosano into a mystery novel written by himself. The mystery details a series of murders in a mansion where a group of travellers are currently staying to take shelter from the snowstorm outside. As Rampo is left without his glasses, he loses all confidence in himself until Yosano is attacked, reigniting in him the courage to actively solve the mystery. After the failure of the contingency plan, Francis has decided to evacuate all Guild members from the Moby Dick and send it crashing into Yokohama to destroy the city. Rampo and Dazai devise a plan to infiltrate the Moby Dick and prevent the tragedy, sending Atsushi into its interior. Atsushi discovers Herman Melville, an old Guild member who used to control Moby Dick before its flesh became mechanical, who reveals that the control terminal is being guarded on the highest floor by Francis. As he journeys towards the upper floors, Atsushi is shocked to meet Akutagawa on the ship.
23	11	"Rashoumon, the Tiger, and the Last Emperor"; Transliteration: "Rashōmon to Tora to Saigo no Tai-kun" (Japanese: 羅生門と虎と最後の大君(たいくん))	Ikurō Satō	Michio Fukuda	December 15, 2016
Atsushi loses all communication with Dazai in an attempt to make Akutagawa avoid fighting him. The two clash with Francis on the top floor in a battle for the control terminal, and in the process reaffirm their hatred for each other; Atsushi is unable to understand how Akutagawa could kill so many people just to demonstrate his power for Dazai's approval, while Akutagawa is unable to understand how Atsushi is still clinging onto his past and fighting to earn the right to live. As the three prepare to face one another on Moby Dick's rooftop, both Atsushi and Akutagawa finally accept each other despite the hatred they share and confront Francis together.
24	12	"If I May Shed Away My Burden Now"; Transliteration: "Moshi Kyō Kono Nimotsu o Oroshite Yoi no nara" (Japanese: 若し今日この荷物を降ろして善いのなら)	Takuya Igarashi	Takuya Igarashi	December 22, 2016
Kyouka, being held captive on an airship meant for storing dangerous ability-users, falls into despair until Dazai makes contact with her and encourages her that anybody, regardless of how many people they've killed, can always turn over a new leaf. Back on Moby Dick's rooftop, Francis reveals his ability "The Great Fitzgerald" which grants him physical power proportional to the amount of money he spends, and how he aims to retrieve a book in Yokohama that is said to be able to make whatever it writes come to reality, intending to use it to bring back his dead daughter. After a long and hard-fought battle, Atsushi and Akutagawa combine forces and finally defeat Francis, who exhausts his fortune and falls from the Moby Dick. Akutagawa retrieves the control terminal but it stops activating, instead allowing the Moby Dick to descend further. Kyouka resolves to pilot the airship and crash it into the Moby Dick in order to sacrifice herself to save others and officially pass the entrance exam and become an Agency member, saving Yokohama. As Atsushi looks on in horror, Dazai reveals that as she had become an Agency member, she also became under the influence of the president's power, "All Men are Created Equal" which allows control over the output of his subordinates' abilities, allowing Kyouka to use Demon Snow to cut her shackles and escape. Dazai acknowledges Akutagawa and everyone looks upon the city, now returned to peace.
25 (Note: This OVA is officially counted as the 25th overall episode of the TV series.)	OVA	"Walking Alone"; Transliteration: "Hitori Ayumu" (Japanese: 独り歩む)	Ikurō Satō	Hiroko Utsumi	August 4, 2017
Kunikida faces a terrorist who aims to destroy a subway and has him choose between the civilians travelling on the train or a young hostage he attacked.

== Home media release ==
=== Japanese ===
Kadokawa Corporation (Japan – Region 2/A)
Volume	Episodes	Release date	Ref.
7	13–14	December 23, 2016	
8	15–16	January 27, 2017	
9	17–18	February 24, 2017	
10	19–20	March 24, 2017	
11	21–22	April 28, 2017	
12	23–24	May 26, 2017	

=== English ===
Crunchyroll, LLC (North America – Region 1/A)
Title	Episodes	Release date	Ref.
Season 2	13–24	September 4, 2018	
Seasons 1 & 2	1–24	September 17, 2019	
