= Golden period =

Golden period may refer to:

- Golden hour (medicine)
- Golden hour (photography)
- Golden Age (disambiguation)
- Golden Time (disambiguation)
