= Kalyug =

Kalyug, Kaliyug, Kali Yuga or Kaliyugam may refer to:

- Kali Yuga, is the "Age of Downfall" in Hinduism, the fourth stage of the world development that we are currently in
- Kali Yug: Goddess of Vengeance, a 1963 Italian film
- Kaliyugam (1952 film), 1952 Indian film
- Kaliyugam (1973 film), 1973 Indian Malayalam-language film
- Kaliyugam (1988 film), 1988 Indian Tamil-language film by K. Subash
- Kaliyugam (2025 film), 2025 Indian Tamil-Telugu post-apocalyptic film
- Kalyug (1981 film), a 1981 Indian Hindi-language crime film
- Kalyug (2005 film), an Indian film based on the pornographic film industry
- Kalyug (novel), 2014 novel by R. Sreeram

== See also ==
- Kalikaalam (disambiguation)
- Kaliyugaya (disambiguation)
- Kali (disambiguation)
- Yuga (disambiguation)
- Dark Ages (disambiguation)
