= Pudhu Yugam =

Pudhu Yugam (lit. 'New Era') can refer to these Indian Tamil-language films:

- Pudhu Yugam (1954 film), a film starring S. A. Natarajan, P. V. Narasimha Bharathi and Krishna Kumari
- Pudhu Yugam (1985 film), a film starring Sivakumar and Vijayakanth

== See also ==
- New Era (disambiguation)
- Yuga (disambiguation)
