= Bungo Stray Dogs season 5 =

Bungo Stray Dogs
- Season 5
- Key visual for the 5th season
- No. of episodes: 11

Release
- Original network: Tokyo MX
- Original release: July 12 – September 20, 2023

Season chronology
- ← Previous; Season 4

The fifth season of the Bungo Stray Dogs anime television series is produced by Bones, directed by Takuya Igarashi and written by Yōji Enokido. Based on the manga series of the same name written by Kafka Asagiri and illustrated by Sango Harukawa, the story focuses on individuals who are gifted with supernatural powers and use them for different purposes including holding a business, solving mysteries, and carrying out missions assigned by the mafia. It mainly follows the members of the "Armed Detective Agency" and their everyday lives.

After the broadcast of the fourth season's finale, a fifth season was announced. The season premiered on July 12, 2023. The opening theme is "Tetsu no Ori" (鉄の檻; lit. 'Iron Cell') by Granrodeo, while the ending theme is "Kiseki" (軌跡; lit. 'Trails') by Luck Life.

== Episodes ==
No. overall	No. in season	Title (Note: English translated titles are taken from Crunchyroll.)	Directed by	Storyboarded by	Original release date
51	1	"The Strongest Man"; Transliteration: "Saikyō no Otoko" (Japanese: 最強の男)	Shinnosuke Itō	Taizo Yoshida	July 12, 2023
Sigma is saved from dying by Nikolai who intends to take down Fyodor. Meanwhile, Atsushi discovers he was given by Sigma the identity of the last Fallen Angel, Kamui, who possesses a page from the nameless book that turned the Agency into terrorists. Kamui gathers all members of the Agency until revealing his true identity being Rampo who is actually assisting the group in secret and prove their innocence to the police as he reveals the nature of the fake terrorism.
52	2	"The Answer to Everything"; Transliteration: "Subete no Kotae he" (Japanese: 凡テノ答ヘ)	Akiyo Ohashi	Takuya Igarashi & Masatoyo Takada	July 19, 2023
With help of a rebellious cop, Rampo reunites with his comrades and have Kunikida treated. Meanwhile, the government wants Fukuchi's help with leading their military forces which agrees. He then finds Ranpo to help the Agency despite their current status based on the relationship he has with Fukuzawa. As Fukuchi agrees, the three escape on a ship. There, a shocked Rampo realizes the real Kamui who has been using Nikolai and Fyodor is actually Fukuchi and hides inside one of Poe's novels. As Atsushi is easily overwhelmed by Fukuchi's power, Akutagawa from the Port Mafia has infiltrated the ship.
53	3	"Hero vs. Criminal"	Shinnosuke Itō	Shinnosuke Itō	July 26, 2023
Under Dazai's request, Akutagawa comes to the ship to assist Atsushi in their fight against Fukuchi. However, they are no match for him and escape. Fukuchi easily catches up to them, revealing his true power; A sword named Amenogozen capable to travel across dimension at a certain length to reach its target. Overwhelmed by Amenogozen, Akutagawa acts like if he is going to kill Atsushi and become Fukuchi's successor but he instead passes his Rashomon cloak to enhance Atsushi's power to kill Fukuchi. However, Amenogozen travels back in time to stop the attack from happening. Before Rashomon can make another attack, Amenogozen slices Akutagawa's throat.
54	4	"Hero War, Gang War."	Koji Nagatomi	Takahiro Hasui	August 2, 2023
After Atsushi escapes through Akutagawa's divertion, Fukuchi decides to revive the late Port Mafia member as a vampire through the Decay of Angel member Bram Stoker's powers. The revived Akutagawa goes berserker and starts causing chaos by creating more vampires. The Hunting Dogs are summoned by Fukuchi to deal with the current situations with Tachihara revealing an item that could be used to reveal the Agency's innocence among this chaos. Upon being split, Fukuchi learns that Tachihara has become a double agent and turns him into another vampire after besting him in battle. With more vampires being released, Fukuchi reveals his intentions to other nations to start a war.
55	5	"At the Port in the Sky (Part 1)"; Transliteration: "Sora no Minato Nitte (Sono Ichi)" (Japanese: 空ノ港ニテ（其の一）)	Takayuki Yamamoto	Taizo Yoshida	August 9, 2023
Bram's forces starts taking down armies so that Fukuchi will find the hidden weapon One Order, Britain's Gifted organization, which will give him the power control the mind of every soldier. One of the Hunting Dogs, Jouno, notices Aya (a young girl who was saved by Kunikida previously), and when preparing to ask her, he is stopped by his leader. Reunited alone, Fukuchi reveals Jouno Bram's power but Jouno betrays him. Fukuchi easily bests him and has him turned into a vampire by Akutagawa. In his last moments, Jouno buys time for the child to take a picture of Fukuchi, having already doubting of his leader when reading Tachihara's heartbeats.
56	6	"At the Port in the Sky (Part 2)"; Transliteration: "Sora no Minato Nitte (Sono Ni)" (Japanese: 空ノ港ニテ（其の二）)	Takanori Yano	Tomoyo Kamoi	August 16, 2023
Kunikida causes an explosion in the area to confuse the foreigners delivering One Order, forcing Fukuchi to rejoin the Hunting Dogs. Although Fukuchi reclaims the One Order, he is shocked when realizing the item has been sealed through Dazai's schemes. Meanwhile, Nikolai comes to Dazai and Dostoyevsky's prison alongside Sigma to make only one of them escape alive. Both Dazai and Dostoyvevky inject themselves with a mortal substance that can only be cured by Nikolai. Aya then meets Bram and tries to ask for his help to stop the vampire breakout. Bram ultimately gives up when hearing music from the anime's ending theme connected to his ears.
57	7	"At the Port in the Sky (Part 3)"; Transliteration: "Sora no Minato Nitte (Sono San)" (Japanese: 空ノ港ニテ（其の三）)	Shinnosuke Itō	Masatoshi Hakada	August 23, 2023
Nikolai gives Dazai and Dostoyevsky a challenge in which only one of them can leave prison and are free to use anything for their objective. While Dostoyevsky choose an item provided by Nikolai to control Chuuya's vampire, Dazai takes Sigma for unknown reasons. Meanwhile, Atsushi and Kenji confront the two remaining Hunting Dogs underlings who are searching for Jouno and Tachihara.
58	8	"Land of Inhuman Demons (Part 1)"; Transliteration: "Jingai Makyō (Sono Ichi)" (Japanese: 人外魔境（其の一）)	Kōta Mori	Kōta Mori	August 30, 2023
The fight between the detectives and the Hunting Dogs escalate. Meanwhile, Dazai easily leaves the prison by using teamwork with Ango involving a Gifted thief whose power allows him to defeat the guards. With Chuuya unable to break the doors, he and Fyodor are left to drown while Dazai and Sigma remain victorious. Just as this happens, Aya and Bram try to escape but are attacked by Akutagawa's vampire.
59	9	"Land of Inhuman Demons (Part 2)"; Transliteration: "Jingai Makyō (Sono Ni)" (Japanese: 人外魔境（其の二）)	Takayuki Yamamoto	Akiyo Ohashi	September 6, 2023
Aya and Bram are saved by the Agency from Akutagawa, but then Fukuchi appears. Teruko tells Atsushi the object of the Decay of Angels which remains unknown to the audience. Meanwhile, Fukuzawa fights Fukuchi alone as his underlings are taken down by his rival. In the meantime, it is revealed that the two are rivals since their youth and Fukuchi's state decayed when going to war with multiple catastrophes happening to his allies and him there. As Fukuchi defeats Fukuzawa, Fyodor and Chuuya are revealed to have survived thanks to the latter's skills. Meanwhile, Atsushi leaves Teruko to help his friends despite having pity in regards to Fukuchi.
60	10	"Land of Inhuman Demons (Part 3)"; Transliteration: "Jingai Makyō (Sono San)" (Japanese: 人外魔境（其の三）)	Takanori Yano & Tomoyo Kamoi	Tomoyo Kamoi	September 13, 2023
Aya and Bram are spared by Akutagawa who is then confronted by Atsushi. Although Atsushi has the power to defeat Akutagawa, his fear of killing him for real now that Rashomon is now longer protecting leads him to be overpowered. In the prison, Dazai helps Sigma escapes as he stays behind wounded. While Sigma attempts to escape, he instead ends up threatening Fyodor to know everything about him through his own skill. Fyodor stabs him but allows Sigma to touch him to reveal everything about his identity. After Sigma loses consciousness, Chuuya shoots Dazai in the head several times. Fukuchi then obtains approval from the government and unlocks Order One to control the military as Aya and Bram stare hopelessly.
61	11	"Twilight Goodbye"; Transliteration: "Tasogare no Sayōnara" (Japanese: 黄昏のさようなら)	Takayuki Yamamoto, Koji Nagatomi, Shinnosuke Itō & Kōta Mori	Yoshiyuki Asai & Takuya Igarashi	September 20, 2023
In order to separate Bram from the sword, Aya tries to kill herself to expand the weight in her fall. This causes Bram to recover on his own for Aya's sake. Meanwhile, Fukuzawa wounds Fukuchi and cancels the military orders, stopping One Order from working. Meanwhile, as Fyodor prepares to abandon the prison through a helicopter driven by vampires, Dazai appears, revealing Chuuya pretended to be brainwashed to help him and fake his death. With the vampires being freed, the pilot from the helicopter crashes it, taking Fyodor's life in the process. Meanwhile, Fukuchi reveals he started all of his incidents to rid the world of wars and asks Fukuzawa to kill him, accepting defeat. As Fukuchi is unwilling to kill his friend, Teruko is instead delivering the finishing move on her superior. Few hours after Fukuchi's death, an unknown soldier related with him is seen facing Atsushi and the now human Akutagawa.

== Home media release ==
=== Japanese ===
Kadokawa Corporation (Japan – Region 2/A)
Volume	Episodes	Release date	Ref.
21	51–53	September 27, 2023	
22	54–56	October 25, 2023	
23	57–59	November 29, 2023	
24	60–61	December 22, 2023	
