= Captain Earth =

Japanese anime television series

- Cover of the first Captain Earth DVD

キャプテン・アース (Kyaputen Āsu)
- Genre: Mecha
- Anime television series
- Directed by: Takuya Igarashi
- Written by: Yōji Enokido
- Music by: Satoru Kōsaki (Monaca)
- Studio: Bones
- Licensed by: AUS: Hanabee; NA: Sentai Filmworks; UK: MVM Entertainment
- Original network: MBS, Tokyo MX, TVA, BS11, MBC
- Original run: April 5, 2014 – September 20, 2014
- Episodes: 25
- Manga
- Written by: Hiroshi Nakanishi
- Published by: Shogakukan
- Imprint: Shōnen Sunday Comics
- Magazine: Weekly Shōnen Sunday; (April 19 – October 8, 2014); Club Sunday; (October 24, 2014 – April 17, 2015)
- Original run: April 9, 2014 – April 17, 2015
- Volumes: 4
- Video game

Captain Earth: Mind Labyrinth
- Developer: Bandai Namco Games
- Publisher: Bandai Namco Games
- Genre: Visual novel
- Platform: PlayStation Vita
- Released: JP: February 26, 2015

Captain Earth (Japanese: キャプテン・アース, Hepburn: Kyaputen Āsu) is a Japanese anime television series produced by Bones, directed by Takuya Igarashi and written by Yōji Enokido. It was broadcast for twenty-five episodes in Japan on MBS from April to September 2014. The series follows high-school student Daichi Manatsu who starts working for the Globe organization to pilot a giant robot called the Earth Engine Impacter to protect the Earth from the invading alien force known as the "Kill-T-Gang", that intends to drain all the life force of mankind to empower their immortal existences.

== Plot ==
High-school student Daichi Manatsu works for the Globe (グローブ, Gurōbu) organization to pilot a giant robot called the Earth Engine Impacter (アースエンジンインパクター, Āsu Enjin Inpakutā) to protect the Earth from the invading alien force known as the "Kill-T-Gang" (キルトガング, Kirutogangu), that intends to drain all the life force of mankind to empower their immortal existences. In order to aid Daichi, Globe starts gathering allies including Teppei Arashi, a Kill-T-Gang whose memories have been erased and trapped inside a human's body; Hana Mutou, a mysterious girl connected to the ship Blume; and Akari Yomatsuri, a 17-year-old genius hacker. Together they form the Midsummer's Knights and fight the Kill-T-Gangs who are in search of more of their allies.

== Characters ==
=== Globe ===
==== Midsummer's Knights ====
Daichi Manatsu (真夏 ダイチ, Manatsu Daichi)
Voiced by: Miyu Irino
Daichi is a 17-year-old high school student who lost his father years prior in a space travel accident and left his family's home on Tanegashima afterwards. When he sees a ringed rainbow formation on a television broadcast from the Tanegashima Space Center, he returns. Because of his skill at a particular arcade game, it makes him the perfect pilot for the Earth Engine Impacter and the smaller Earth Engine Ordinary component robot. Daichi is able to summon a mysterious laser handgun known as the Livlaster Tanegashima, a powerful weapon that utilizes pure Orgone energy, which is essential for piloting the Earth Engine. Later he is assigned the title of "Captain Earth", the leader of the Midsummer's Knights. Daichi is uncomfortable with his new title and the responsibilities that come from being a "Captain" like his father. The Planetary Gears refer to Daichi as a "Neoteny." Daichi wears a white and red flight suit on missions, matching the Earth Engine's paint job. He is the first human to use a Livlaster.
Teppei Arashi (嵐 テッペイ, Arashi Teppei)
Voiced by: Hiroshi Kamiya
Teppei is one of Daichi's childhood friends. Daichi is in fact his only friend, as the boy was the only person to not fear his otherworldly abilities, such as being able to create a rainbow ring in his hand. Teppei rarely smiles at anyone and seemed happy when Daichi wasn't afraid of his weird powers. He is, in truth, the human form of the Type-3 Kill-T-Gang known as Albion and is called "Alaya" by other Kill-T-Gang members. The genes for his "Designer's Child" human body were provided by a man named Eiji Arashi, who was in stasis on the Tenkaido station before escaping. Teppei's Ego Block is eventually destroyed, leaving him a normal human. Though he loses the ability to become Albion, he gains his own Livlaster, which he uses to power up his own mecha, the prototype Nebula Engine Impacter. His Machine Goodfellow unit, the silver-colored Aramusha, is converted into the Nebula Engine Ordinary component robot. Like Daichi, Teppei is now referred to as a "Neoteny" by the Planetary Gears. Teppei wears a blue flight suit when on missions, matching the paint scheme on the Nebula Engine.
Hana Mutou (夢塔 ハナ, Mutō Hana)
Voiced by: Ai Kayano
Hana is a strange girl who appears to be 17 years old as her true age is unknown. She was discovered in the basement of the Tanegashima Space Center enclosed in a sphere. Hana was found with a Livlaster weapon of her own, but she is unable to summon or use it and it is kept in storage at Globe HQ. She is connected to a ship known as Blume, hidden somewhere on Tanegashima Island, and possesses the ability to instill Orgone energy from Blume into a Machine Goodfellow unit by singing a certain song. She is also often accompanied by a strange squirrel-like creature named Pitz that can communicate with her and predict Orgone energy events. She is in love with Daichi. Hana was created by the Planetary Gears as a living weapon capable of using a Livlaster, but she escaped to Earth to hide in stasis until Daichi found her years later. Hana wears a pink flight suit when on missions and later becomes the pilot of Globe's third mecha, the Flare Engine Impacter.

Pitz (ピッツ, Pittsu)

Voiced by: Kotori Koiwai

Pitz is Hana's blue squirrel-like creature that can communicate with her and predict Orgone energy events. Also theorized to be the mysterious blue hair girl showing out from time to time.
Akari Yomatsuri (夜祭 アカリ, Yomatsuri Akari)
Voiced by: Rina Hidaka
Akari is a 17-year-old genius hacker who styles herself as a magical girl of sorts. She is Nishikubo and Yomatsuri's daughter, and claims she dedicated herself to hacking while her parents were not with her due to work. She has allegedly hacked into international satellites even from the US. She operates under the handle "Code Papillon" when hacking. Akari is so skilled at computers, she has the ability to access and control every weapon of mass destruction on the planet, but she claims she can only attempt this once, as the world's governments would recognize and counter future attempts. Akari wears a yellow flight suit on missions.

==== Tanegashima Base ====
Tsutomu Nishikubo (西久保 ツトム, Nishikubo Tsutomu)
Voiced by: Rikiya Koyama
Nishikubo is the head of the Globe organization's Tanegashima Base. He previously worked with Daichi's father Taiyou Manatsu. He's Akari's father whom she rarely sees due to work. Nishikubo has a habit of going over the heads of his superiors if it means completing a mission successfully.
Rita Hino (日野 リタ, Hino Rita)
Voiced by: Kaori Nazuka
Rita is the deputy head of the Globe organization's Tanegashima Base.
Peter Westvillage (ピーター・ウエストビレッジ, Pītā Uesutobirejji)
Voiced by: Kōichi Sakaguchi
The technology development manager of the Globe organisation, he was a former employee of Macbeth Enterprises.
Sander (サンダー, Sandā)
Voiced by: Shun Takagi
One of the operators at the Tanegashima Base. He has black skin.
Trias (トリアス, Toriasu)
Voiced by: Ryōsuke Kaneki
One of the operators at the Tanegashima Base. He has blond hair.

==== Tenkaido ====
Tenkaido is Globe's space station, where Kill-T-Gang attacks are monitored. The station also houses several thousand people in stasis as part of an evacuation plan should the Impacters ever fail.

Tsubaki Yomatsuri (夜祭 ツバキ, Yomatsuri Tsubaki)
Voiced by: Yōko Sōmi
The head of the Tenkaido, she is Akari's mother and Tsutomu's ex-wife.
Mia (ミア)
Voiced by: Kotori Koiwai
One of the operators of the Tenkaido. She has blonde hair.
Rena (レナ)
Voiced by: Ikumi Nakagami
One of the operators of the Tenkaido. She has brown hair.

=== Planetary Gears ===
The Planetary Gears are a group of alien beings, known as Kill-T-Gang, who feed on orgone energy originating from human libido. Their essences are contained in Ego Blocks, which are digitized forms of consciousness, stored on a ship stranded in the orbit of Uranus. Nine years before the start of the series, the Planetary Gears wiped out a research team stationed on the dark side of the moon, draining their libido and creating a giant, glowing crystal that covers most of the moon's surface. Kill-T-Gang are able to inhabit genetically engineered, artificial bodies known as Designer's Children, and can inhabit and pilot their true forms, giant mecha-like energy beings, through cockpit-like devices known as "Machine Goodfellow", which can also be converted into small mecha for Earth-based combat. Kill-T-Gang have access to special abilities known as "singularities" that differ on the individual but have the common trait of both sharing memories and communicating telepathically through kissing. Because the Kill-T-Gang's true forms absorb libido through proximity, humanity would be wiped out should even one make it to the Earth, necessitating the use of Impacters.

Amara (アマラ)
Voiced by: Kenichi Suzumura
The humanoid form of the Type-1 Kill-T-Gang robot Amarok (アマロック, Amarokku). He is the leader of the invasion force he calls the "Planetary Gears", and sees the eternal lives of the Kill-T-Gang as their strength. To Amara, humanity is nothing more than a pure energy source to extend the Kill-T-Gang's powers. Nine years before the series, he faced Taiyou Manatsu and caused his death and was also responsible for the large crystal on the moon's surface. After his and Moco's attacks are thwarted by Daichi and Teppei, Amara uses Puck to search for his dormant comrades and reawaken them to their true selves. Amara has a singularity ability that allows him to awaken a Kill-T-Gang with a kiss. Amara's blue Machine Goodfellow unit is known as Tenrousei (literally "Celestial Wolf Star").
Moco (モコ, Moko)
Voiced by: Maaya Sakamoto
The humanoid form of the Type-2 Kill-T-Gang robot Malkin (モールキン, Mōrukin). She is the first Kill-T-Gang encountered by Daichi and co-leads the Planetary Gears along Amara. After her and Amara's attacks are thwarted by Daichi and Teppei, she along Amara search for their dormant comrades and awake them to their true selves. Moco is a skilled hacker, but not on the level of Akari, and her singularity ability allows her to transfer memories and knowledge through kissing. Moco's pink Machine Goodfellow unit is known as Moukou Usagi (literally "Assault Rabbit").
Setsuna (セツナ)
Voiced by: Haruka Kudō
The humanoid form of the Type-8 Kill-T-Gang robot Siren (セイレーン, Seirēn). It takes the form of a childish looking girl wearing a large hat. Setuna is accompanied by a pink squirrel-like being of the same species as Pitz named Lappa and has the power to siphon Orgone Energy from nearby beings by singing. She is the true leader of the Planetary Gears.
Zin (ジン, Jin)
Voiced by: Kōki Uchiyama
The humanoid form of the Type-6 Kill-T-Gang robot Zinbalt (ジンバルト, Jinbaruto). He takes the form of a dignified young man in a long cloak. He was a quiet but talented individual, and was a dealer at a casino, having his talents exploited by others he felt, he had nothing of his own before being reawakened. His singularity ability gives him the power to disrupt and disable any electronics in a wide radius. Zin's red Machine Goodfellow unit is named Jingaikyou and its mecha configuration is equipped with a large fan for flight.
Ai (アイ)
Voiced by: Nozomi Yamamoto
The humanoid form of the Type-5 Kill-T-Gang robot Aiatar (アイアタル, Aiataru). It takes the form of a young woman in a long flowing dress. Ai was a popular teen idol, who became insecure of her career, before her reawakening. Ai's yellow Machine Goodfellow unit is known as Hebihanabi (literally "Fire Flower") and is a heavy artillery unit equipped with large shoulder cannons.
Lin (リン, Rin)
Voiced by: Megumi Han
The humanoid form of the Type-4 Kill-T-Gang robot Lieban (リーバン, Rīban). It takes the form of a young woman in a dress that shows off her legs. She was a fiercely competitive and unmatched biker, who was obsessed with speed, a trait that carries even after her reawakening. Lin's turquoise Machine Goodfellow unit, Ningyohime (literally "Mermaid Princess"), is a speedy watercraft equipped with combat knives.
Baku (バク)
Voiced by: Toshiyuki Toyonaga
The humanoid form of the Type-7 Kill-T-Gang robot Bugbear (バグベア, Bagubea). It takes the form of a young man who appears to be trained in martial arts. He was first confined and later sold to the Asanoda Yakuza after Kumiko, the daughter heir chose him, and serves as an illegal wrestler for the family to earn large funds through bets earning a name for himself. During a match against Amara, he has vague memories of his previous encounters with him, causing him confusion and escapes before Moco could awaken him. Eventually it is revealed that every member of the Asanoda family was killed on a bombing incident, causing him to revive all the victims with his Singularity. However, since they are not fully revived, his power fades and all people die again, including Kumiko, and joins the Planetary Gears out of grief. Baku's green Machine Goodfellow unit, Bakuretsujyu, is a close-combat unit equipped with brass knuckle weapons and stretchable arms and legs.

=== Macbeth Enterprises ===
Macbeth Enterprises is a greatly successful conglomerate, and one of the major stakeholders of the Planetary Gears, designing the Machine Goodfellows and the Designer Child program, and assist the aliens in different ways. After the Kanda Incident, a major scandal that involved several government agencies discovering the illegal genetic modification of children, and the apparent suicide of its former CEO, the company is under the management of Masaki Kube, a member of the company's founding family.

Masaki Kube (久部 マサキ, Kube Masaki)
Voiced by: Yuya Uchida
The current CEO of Macbeth Enterprises. He plans to exploit the use of Orgone Energy, Designer Children, the Kiltgangs and the Kivotos Plan to his own ends in order to rule over humanity and holds his secretary Hitomi in high regard and as a possible love interest. Despite his knowledge of the Kiltgangs, he seems to be completely oblivious that Amara and Moco are in fact the aliens themselves and believes them to be submissive Designer Children that he holds in high esteem. After discovering that Puck has not been completely loyal to him, he confronts the computer and threatens to shut it down, but its emergency interrupter is ineffective and Kube is subsequently knocked unconscious through gas, and has his body snatched by Puck through a machine that transferred its consciousness.
Hitomi Makino (牧野 ヒトミ, Makino Hitomi)
Voiced by: Hiroko Ushida
Kube's personal secretary. She is the closest to Kube and he shares many of his secrets solely to her, as he holds her in high regard. She does her best to ensure the company and its employees are working to the best, and is very strict. Hitomi has feelings for Kube which are seemingly reciprocated.
Puck (パック, Pakku)
Voiced by: Hiroki Shimowada
A mysterious computer hidden in a special room within Macbeth Enterprises main office, with a highly advanced AI that allows him to engage in normal conversations, usually commenting on Kube's love affair. He is also known as P.A.C. Although apparently submissive towards Kube, he is secretly aligned with the Planetary Gears, taking orders from Amara and Moco and assisting them the best he can. He eventually lays a trap for Kube, using gas to make him lose consciousness and use a special consciousness-transferring machine that previously belonged to Mao Marimura in order to take possession of Kube's body. He tends to use the catchphrase "Puck does not lie".

=== Other characters ===
Taiyou Manatsu (真夏 タイヨウ, Manatsu Taiyō)
Voiced by: Toshiyuki Morikawa
Daichi's father, who died in a suicidal attack nine years before the events of the series during the Kill-T-Gang's first attempt to invade the Earth. Daichi was told that he had died in an accident. Taiyou was a "Captain", a title that his son eventually inherits.
Toshiaki Manatsu (真夏 トシアキ, Manatsu Toshiaki)
Voiced by: Makoto Yasumura
Brother of Taiyou Manatsu, Daichi's uncle and legal guardian.

== Release ==
The anime series is directed by Takuya Igarashi and produced by Bones. Igarashi made sure the title did not sound like a made-up word when revealing it. Through it, he wants the viewers to imagine what it would be like and create a different impression when watching the show. Unlike his previous work, Star Driver, Captain Earth focused less on high schools and more on the relationship between human characters who pilot mechas. Something the team was aiming for with Captain Earth is having a good looking launch sequence as he believes "robots and rockets are deeply imbued with childhood dreams and that sort of giddy excitement in boys' hearts."

The series is being simulcasted by Crunchyroll in their website. It premiered in Japan on April 5, 2014, on MBS, and at later dates on Tokyo MX, TVA, BS11 and MBC. It was broadcast for twenty-five episodes. For the first thirteen episodes, the opening theme is "Believer's High" (ビリーバーズ・ハイ, Birībāzu Hai) by flumpool, and the ending theme is "Amethyst" (アメジスト, Amejisuto) performed by Ai Kayano as "HANA star. Ai Kayano" (HANA star. 茅野愛衣). Kayano also performed the song "Mugen no Hana" (夢幻の華; lit. 'Flower of Dreams') as her character Hana Mutou, which was included in the first episode. From episode fourteen onwards, the opening theme is "TOKYO Dreamer" by Nico Touches the Walls and the ending theme is "The Glory Days" by Tia.

Satoshi Ishino is adapting Fumi Minato's original character designs for animation, and he is also the chief animation director. A Star Driver veteran, Shigeto Koyama, designed the Earth Engine and other Engine Series mecha, while Takayuki Yanase handled the Machine Goodfellow designs and other mecha. Shinji Aramaki and Takeshi Takakura are the other mechanical designers. Masaki Asai and Takeshi Yoshioka designed the enemy Kill-T-Gang, and the artist okama is contributing concept designs. Tsuyoshi Kusano is the graphic designer, and Masatsugu Saitō is credited for design works.

The series was released onto DVD and Blu-ray format with the first volume published on July 18, 2014. The anime has been licensed by Sentai Filmworks for digital and home video release.

=== Episodes ===
No.	Title	Directed by	Written by	Original release date
1	"Earth Engine Open Fire"; Transliteration: "Āsuenjin Hibuta o Kiru" (Japanese: アースエンジン火蓋を切る)	Yoshiyuki Asai	Yōji Enokido	April 5, 2014
Several years after the death of his father, Daichi Manatsu returns to Globe's Tanegashima base and while exploring an abandoned building where he befriended a mysterious boy called Teppei Arashi during his childhood, he is entrusted with a gun-like artifact called the "Livlaster", that allows him to pilot the "Earth Engine", a massive mecha that is mankind's trump card against the alien race Kill-T-Gang, that threatens to destroy all mankind.
2	"It's Called Livlaster"; Transliteration: "Jū no Na wa Raiburasutā" (Japanese: 銃の名はライブラスター)	Ikuro Sato	Yōji Enokido	April 12, 2014
Assisted by the hacker Akari Yomatsuri, Daichi successfully repels the Kill-T-Gang's attack and after returning to Earth, he reunites with Teppei and Hana Mutou, a mysterious girl both Daichi and Teppei met during their childhood. Enraged with the inhuman treatment given to Teppei and Hana, Daichi decides to do something about it.
3	"The Rainbow of Albion"; Transliteration: "Arubion no Niji" (Japanese: アルビオンの虹)	Takahiko Kyōgoku	Yōji Enokido	April 19, 2014
Daichi and his friends move to the house of Akari's father, Tsutomu Nishikubo, the commander of Tanegashima Base, and start living together, until another Kill-T-Gang robot, Amarok, attacks Earth. Upon being informed that it is the same machine that killed his father Daichi recklessly confronts the enemy and just as he is about to be defeated, Teppei comes to his rescue, piloting the Kill-T-Gang robot Albion.
4	"Assault of the Planetary Gear"; Transliteration: "Yūsei Haguruma Sōchi no Kyōshū" (Japanese: 遊星歯車装置の強襲)	Keisuke Onishi	Yōji Enokido	April 26, 2014
Daichi and Teppei repel the Kill-T-Gang's attack once more, but Teppei is put in custody after revealing his identity. Akari and Daichi decide to pay a visit to him nonetheless, when Amara and Moco, the pilots of the Kill-T-Gang robots they faced, attack the Tanegashima Base in an attempt to extract him.
5	"Starry Sky's Picture Book"; Transliteration: "Hoshizora no Ehon" (Japanese: 星空の絵本)	Fumio Maezono	Yōji Enokido	May 3, 2014
Akari and Teppei are tasked to infiltrate Globe's space station "Tenkaido" in order to rescue Eiji Arashi, a criminal whose genes were used to create Teppei, making of him his biological father. However, they are ambushed by members of a rival organization that intends to kidnap Eiji for his own purposes.
6	"Kivoto's Plan"; Transliteration: "Kibotosu Keikaku" (Japanese: キヴォトス計画)	Ikuro Sato	Yōji Enokido	May 10, 2014
The efforts of mankind to deal with the Kill-T-Gang's threat are divided between two factions, and while the Globe's "Intercept Faction" intends to prevent the enemy to attack Earth, the organization Salty Dog's "Ark Faction" supports the "Kivotos Plan" which consists of salvaging a small group of humans from the destruction of mankind. When a member of Salty Dog intends to kidnap Hana for their own purposes, Daichi steps in to save her.
7	"The Midsummer's Knights are Born"; Transliteration: "Tanjou Middosamazu Naitsu" (Japanese: 生ミッドサマーズナイツ)	Toshinori Narita	Yōji Enokido	May 17, 2014
Amara and Moco join forces in a combined attack on Earth and both Daichi and Teppei struggle against them. In the occasion, Daichi is about to be killed when Teppei makes an unexpected choice to save him.
8	"Sign from the Dark"; Transliteration: "Sono Sain ni Kizuku Yoru" (Japanese: その作印に気付く夜)	Yoshiyuki Asai	Yōji Enokido	May 24, 2014
After failing to attack Earth by themselves, Amara and Moco decide to awaken the other members of their race that are scattered to assist them. The first member they contact is Zin, the avatar of the robot Zimbalt and to confront him, Globe dispatches their newest unit composed of Daichi and his friends, the "Midsummer's Knights".
9	"Magical Girl Akari-chan"; Transliteration: "Mahou Shoujo Akari-chan" (Japanese: 魔法少女アカリちゃん)	Takanori Yano	Yōji Enokido	May 31, 2014
Ai, the avatar of the robot Aiatar is the second Design Child contacted by Amara and Moco, and to increase their chances of success, they kidnap Akari and force her to infiltrate mankind's orbital defense systems while Daichi confronts Ai with serious disadvantages.
10	"On the Windy Planet"; Transliteration: "Kaze no Hoshi de" (Japanese: 風の星で風の星で)	Hiroko Kazui	Yōji Enokido	June 7, 2014
Amara and Moco awaken Lin, the third of their companions and the Avatar of the Kill-T-Gang Liebam. Daichi confronts Lin and defeats her, but fails to prevent her from summoning Liebam and it's up to Teppei to stop her, piloting his own machine, the "Nebula Engine".
11	"Through the Window of Setsuna"; Transliteration: "Setsuna no Madobe" (Japanese: セツナの窓辺)	Shou Omachi	Yōji Enokido	June 14, 2014
Akari and Hana befriend a young girl called Setsuna, unaware that she is one of the missing Design Children. Amara and Moco attempt to contact Setsuna, but stumble into a confrontation with Daichi and Teppei instead, while Setsuna learns the shocking truth behind the experiments made on her by her caretaker.
12	"Let's Fight, Boys"; Transliteration: "Tatakau Shounen-tachi" (Japanese: 闘う少年たち)	Ikuro Sato	Yōji Enokido	June 21, 2014
The Midsummer's Knights infiltrate an underground ring in search for Baku, the last of the missing Design Children, who is being forced to fight illegal matches for the Yakuza. Amara breaks into the ring and confronts Baku in an attempt to have him remember his past, but is surprised when he refuses. However, neither Amara nor his other companions intend to give up so easily on drawing him back to their side.
13	"Baku's Town"; Transliteration: "Bagu no Machi" (Japanese: バクの街)	Tomoyuki Kurokawa	Yōji Enokido	June 28, 2014
Baku refuses to join the other Planetary Gears out of his attachment to Kumiko, the daughter of the local Yakuza. But this changes when the truth about Kumiko comes to surface and Baku decides to take revenge on Earth by helping destroy it.
14	"A Maiden's Tear That Sparkled Through the Night"; Transliteration: "Yoru wo Tsuranuku Shoujo no Namida" (Japanese: 夜をつらぬく少女の涙)	Toru Yoshida	Yōji Enokido	July 5, 2014
With no missions to perform in the next days, Daichi and his friends are given a few days of R&R. In the occasion, Hana reveals that she loves Daichi, but fears what he may think of her if she reveals her true self to him. Meanwhile, Amara and Moco take control of a massive asteroid and drop it on Southern Japan with the intention of destroying the Tanegashima Base.
15	"True Self"; Transliteration: "Hontou no Jibun" (Japanese: 本当の自分)	Takanori Yano	Yōji Enokido	July 12, 2014
Running away from her friends, Hana meets Setsuna again, and the two end up pursued by Amara and Moco, while Puck, the AI built by Macbeth Enterprises, lays a trap to the CEO and snatches his body. Once Daichi and Hana finally reunite, he reconciles with her, just before the Planetary Gears attack them.
16	"Her Flare"; Transliteration: "Furea no Senkou" (Japanese: フレアの閃光)	Yoshiyuki Asai	Yōji Enokido	July 19, 2014
Now finally assembled, the Planetary Gears get the full support of Macbeth Enterprises in their endeavors, unaware of Puck's true intentions. Meanwhile, with Daichi and Teppei still recovering from the last battle, Hana pilots her own machine, the "Flare Engine" to counter another enemy attack.
17	"The Knights of Midsummer"; Transliteration: "Manatsu no Kishitachi" (Japanese: 真夏の騎士たち)	Ikuro Sato	Yōji Enokido	July 26, 2014
An inspector from Salty Dog arrives at the Tanegashima Base and questions the merits of the Midsummer's Knights so far. Meanwhile, Moco and Zin launch another attack on Earth, and with Hana's Engine still under repairs, Daichi and Teppei are dispatched to stop them. Salty Dog sends their new remote controlled interceptors to the fight as well, but Daichi and Teppei get themselves in a pinch when Moco takes control of the machines to fight for her.
18	"Onslaught Through the Wilderness"; Transliteration: "Kouya no Moushuu" (Japanese: 荒野の猛襲)	Shou Omachi	Yōji Enokido	August 2, 2014
Daichi, Hana and Teppei board a shuttle to return to Earth, but during reentry, an unexpected change of course leaves them stranded in the middle of Australia. Knowing that they were victims of sabotage, the three battle some enemy forces in the middle of the desert in order to protect Hana from being captured by them.
19	"Your Smile Means Everything"; Transliteration: "Ima wa Hohoemu Kimi dakara" (Japanese: 今は微笑む君だから)	Kenjirō Okada	Yōji Enokido	August 9, 2014
After hijacking a transport to return home, Daichi and the others are pursued by an unmanned Impacter from Salty Dog, who is determined to capture Hana at all costs for the sake of their plans, but seeing her friends in danger, she takes a drastic measure to save them.
20	"Satellitejack"; Transliteration: "Sateraitojakku" (Japanese: サテライトジャック)	Tomoyuki Kurokawa	Yōji Enokido	August 16, 2014
To defeat the Planetary Gears once and for all, the Midsummer's Knights prepare to depart for Uranus in order to destroy the enemy spaceship and render them powerless as part of their master plan, the "Operation Summer". However, Ai, disguised as a model on a PR event, infiltrates the Tenkaido space station to stop them, and the situation gets even more hectic when Salty Dog makes their move as well.
21	"The Meaning of a Captain"; Transliteration: "Kyaputen no Jouken" (Japanese: キャプテンの条件)	Toru Yoshida	Yōji Enokido	August 23, 2014
Hana is kidnapped by Salty Dog, but Daichi and the others are too busy dealing with a shower of debris that threaten the space station. When Teppei's impacter is damaged and unable to move, Daichi is forced to choose between sacrificing his friend or allow the Tenkaido to be destroyed.
22	"The Operation Summer"; Transliteration: "Hatsudou Opereshon Samaa" (Japanese: 発動オペレーションサマー)	Ikuro Sato	Yōji Enokido	August 30, 2014
After averting the previous crisis, Daichi and the others are ready to begin the Operation Summer, but Salty Dog activates their most powerful weapon in order to stop them. Meanwhile, the Planetary Gears succeed to gather enough energy to launch a full scale attack.
23	"A Midsummer Night's Dream"; Transliteration: "Manatsu no yo no yume" (Japanese: 真夏の夜の夢)	Toru Yoshida	Yōji Enokido	September 6, 2014
On their way to Uranus, Daichi has a strange dream where he meets the Planetary Gears who tempt him to keep living with him in a dream world, but manages to escape thanks to the memories of his friends inside his heart.
24	"Auberon" (Japanese: オーベロン)	Yoshiyuki Asai	Yōji Enokido	September 13, 2014
At last the Midsummer's Knights reach the Planetary Gears mothership, Auberon. The enemies attempt to halt their advance, but soon after, Puck appears and takes control of Auberon's systems, betraying the Planetary Gears and declaring his intention to take over the entire galaxy.
25	"Captain Earth"; Transliteration: "Kyaputen Āsu" (Japanese: キャプテン・アース)	Takuya Igarashi	Yoji Enokido	September 20, 2014
Puck takes control of Blume while possessing Hana's body and leaves to consume all life on Earth. With the Planetary Gears defeated, Daichi is the only one left on Puck's way, fighting with all his forces to stop it and rescue Hana.

=== Home video ===
Vol.	Episodes	Blu-ray / DVD artwork	Release date	Ref.
1	1, 2, 3		July 18, 2014	
2	4, 5, 6		August 22, 2014	
3	7, 8		September 26, 2014	
4	9, 10, 11		October 24, 2014	
5	12, 13, 14		November 28, 2014	
6	15, 16		December 26, 2014	
7	17, 18, 19		January 23, 2015	
8	20, 21, 22		February 27, 2015	
9	23, 24, 25		March 27, 2015	

== Manga ==
A manga adaptation illustrated by Hiroshi Nakanishi was serialized in Shogakukan's Weekly Shōnen Sunday magazine from April 19 to October 8, 2014, and later on Club Sunday web platform, from October 24, 2014, to April 17, 2015. Shogakukan collected is chapters in four tankōbon volumes, released from August 18, 2014, to May 18, 2015.

=== Volume list ===
No.	Japanese release date	Japanese ISBN
1	August 18, 2014	978-4-09-125098-8
2	October 17, 2014	978-4-09-125260-9
3	February 18, 2015	978-4-09-125318-7
4	May 18, 2015	978-4-09-125840-3

== Video game ==
A visual novel titled Captain Earth: Mind Labyrinth was released on February 26, 2015, for the PlayStation Vita.

== Reception ==
Andy Hanley from UK Anime Network called it "Eureka Seven meets Star Driver", and noted that this might grab the attention of fans of the prior works. Critical reception to the first episode has been mixed within the Anime News Network staff, with several comments focused on the pacing but mostly praise given to the animation.
