= Golden Age (disambiguation) =

Golden Age refers to a mythological period of primeval human existence perceived as an ideal state when human beings were pure and free from suffering.

Golden Age may also refer to:

- Golden age (metaphor), the classical term used as a metaphor for a period of perceived greatness; includes a list of many golden ages

== Film and television ==
- Golden Age (1934 film), a Chinese film of 1934
- Golden Age (2006 film), an animated internet series later released as a film
- "Golden Age" (Torchwood), a radio episode of the TV series Torchwood
- Berserk: The Golden Age Arc, a 2010s film series based on a manga story arc of the same name
- Elizabeth: The Golden Age, a 2007 sequel to the 1998 film Elizabeth
- L'Age d'Or (The Golden Age), a 1930 surrealist movie by Luis Buñuel and Salvador Dalí
- The Golden Age (1942 film), a 1942 French comedy film directed by Jean de Limur

== Literature ==
=== Novels and essays ===
- A Golden Age, a 2007 novel by Tahmima Anam
- The Golden Age (Grahame book), an 1895 book by Kenneth Grahame
- The Golden Age (London novel), a 2014 novel by Joan London
- The Golden Age (Vidal novel), a 2000 novel by Gore Vidal
- The Golden Age (Wright novel), a 2002 novel in the Golden Oecumene trilogy by John C. Wright

=== Periodicals and comics ===
- The Golden Age (comics), a 1993 DC Comics limited series
- The Golden Age (newspaper), now The Queanbeyan Age, published in New South Wales, Australia
- Awake!, formerly The Golden Age, a magazine published by Jehovah's Witnesses
- The New Golden Age, a 2022-2023 DC Comics event

=== Plays ===
- The Golden Age, a 1611 play by Thomas Heywood
- The Golden Age, a 1984 play by A. R. Gurney
- The Golden Age (Nowra play), a 1985 play by Louis Nowra
- Golden Age, a 2009 play by Terrence McNally

== Music ==
- The Golden Age (Shostakovich), a 1930 ballet by Dmitri Shostakovich
- Golden Age, a recording facility in Auckland run by Joel Little

=== Albums ===
- Golden Age (album), by NCT, or the title song, 2023
- The Golden Age (American Music Club album), 2008
- The Golden Age (Bobby Conn album) or the title song, 2001
- The Golden Age (Cracker album) or the title song, 1996
- The Golden Age (Dizzy Wright album), 2013
- The Golden Age (The Legendary Pink Dots album) or the title song, 1989
- The Golden Age (Woodkid album) or the title song, 2013
- The Golden Age (Your Demise album) or the title song, 2012

=== Songs ===
- "Golden Age" (song), by TV on the Radio, 2008
- "The Golden Age" (song), by the Asteroids Galaxy Tour, 2009
- "Golden Age", by Battle Beast from Battle Beast, 2013
- "Golden Age", by Midnight Oil from Capricornia, 2002
- "Golden Age", by Morgoth from Odium, 1993
- "Golden Age", by Ray Stevens, 1973
- "A Golden Age", by the Waterboys from Fisherman's Blues (25th Anniversary box set), 2013
- "The Golden Age", by Beck from Sea Change, 2002
- "The Golden Age", by Terry Dene, 1958

== Other ==
- Golden Age (1783 ship)
- The Golden Age (Zucchi), a c. 1576–1581 oil on panel painting by Jacopo Zucchi
- The Golden Age (Derain), a c. 1905 oil on canvas painting by André Derain
- Golden Age Lake, a man-made lake under construction in Turkmenistan

== See also ==
- Golden Era (disambiguation)
- Golden Time (disambiguation)
- Golden Years (disambiguation)
- Dark Ages (disambiguation)
