= Golden Years =

Golden Years or The Golden Years may refer to:

== Music ==
- Golden Years (album), an album by David Bowie
- "Golden Years" (David Bowie song), 1975
- "Golden Years" (Ruel and M-Phazes song), 2017
- The Golden Year (album), an album by Ou Est le Swimming Pool
- "Golden Years", a song by Disco Ensemble
- The Golden Years (album), 2024 album by Joshua Bassett
- The Golden Years (EP), an EP by Motörhead

== Film, television and theatre ==
- The Golden Years (1960 film), a 1960 film about bowling
- The Golden Years (1993 film), a 1993 Croatian film
- Golden Years (2016 film), a 2016 British film
- Golden Years (2017 film), a 2017 French film
- Golden Years (miniseries), a 1991 American miniseries from Stephen King
- “Golden Years”, a 1994 episode of Law & Order
- Golden Years (TV programme), a 1998 British TV comedy starring Ricky Gervais
- "The Golden Years" (Kim Possible), a 2003 episode of Kim Possible

== Radio ==
- The Golden Years (play), 1940 radio play, first produced in 1987, by Arthur Miller

== See also ==
- The Golden Year (disambiguation)
- Golden Age (disambiguation)
- Golden Era (disambiguation)
- Golden number (time), year number in the Enneadecaeteris (19 year cycles) counted from 1 BC
