= Jug (nickname) =

As a nickname, Jug may refer to:

- Gene Ammons (1925–1974), American jazz tenor saxophonist
- Jug Bennett (1920–1992), American National Football League player
- Jug Earp (1897–1969), American National Football League player
- Jug Girard (1927–1997), American National Football League player
- Joe Kracher (1913–1981), Major League Baseball player during the 1939 season
- Carl Powis (1928–1999), Major League Baseball player during the 1957 season
- Jug McSpaden (1908–1996), American golfer
- Jug Thesenga (1914–2002), American baseball pitcher
- Jug or Jugg, a nickname for a fisherman from Brighton, England

== See also ==
- Jug (disambiguation)
- Jug (surname)
