= Kalikaalam =

Kalikaalam may refer to these Indian films:

- Kalikaalam (2012 film), a Malayalam drama film
- Kalikaalam (1992 film), an Indian Tamil-language drama film
- Kalikkalam, a 1990 Indian Malayalam-language action thriller film
- Kalikalam, a 1991 Telugu film

== See also ==
- Kaliyuga (disambiguation)
