= Golden Era =

Golden Era may refer to:

- The Golden Era, a 19th-century San Francisco newspaper
- Golden Era Building, a historic building in San Francisco, that once housed the newspaper of the same name
- Golden Era (Del the Funky Homosapien album)
- Golden Era (Rita Redshoes album)
- Golden Era Productions, an organization operated by the Church of Scientology
- Golden Era Records, an Australian record label
- The Golden Era (film)
- Sino-British relations, often referred to as a "Golden Era" in the current time.

== See also ==
- Golden Age (disambiguation)
- Golden Years (disambiguation)
