= The Golden Age (Zucchi) =

Painting by Jacopo Zucchi

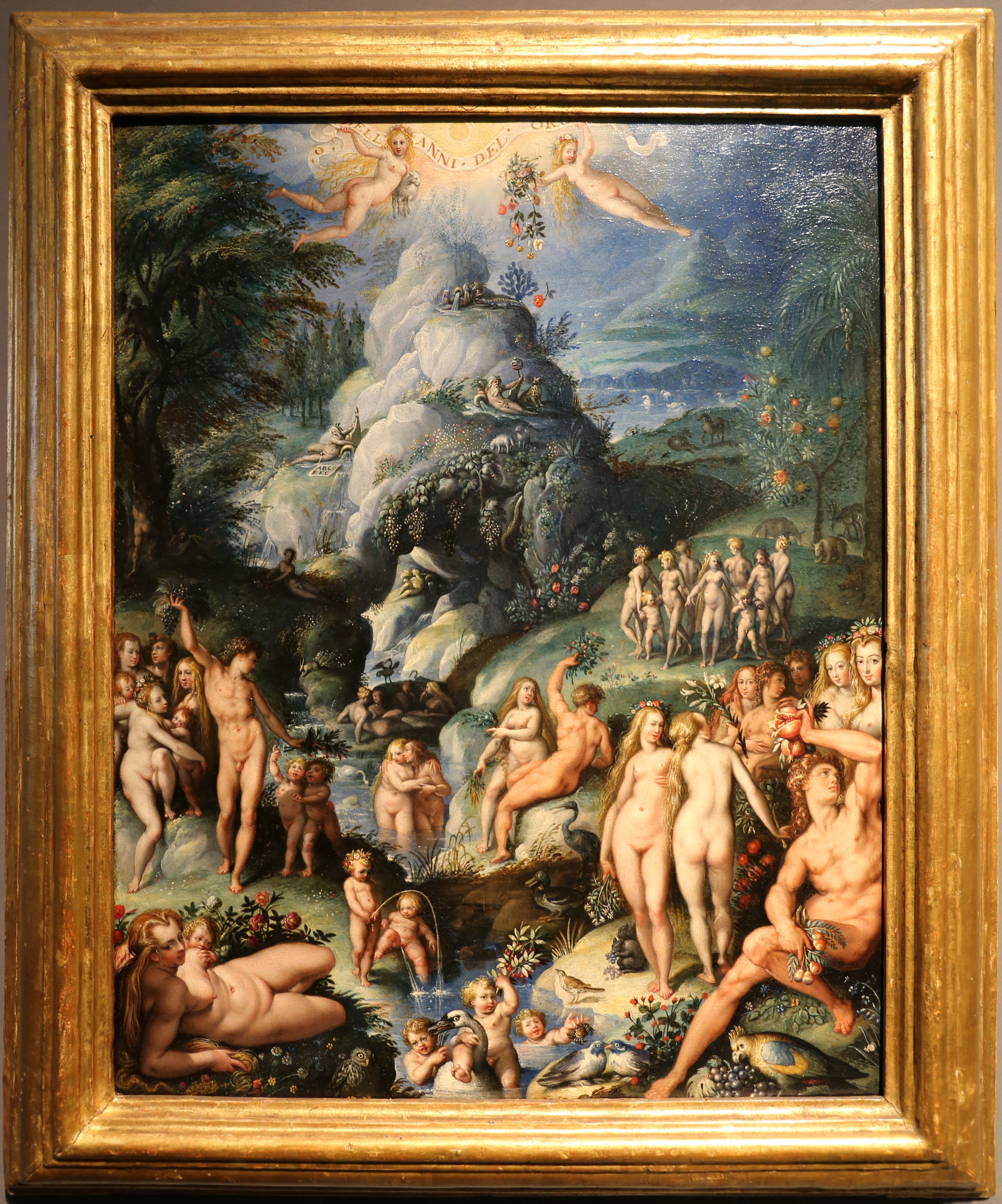
The Golden Age (c. 1576-1581) by Jacopo Zucchi

The Golden Age is a c. 1576–1581 oil on panel painting of the Golden Age by Jacopo Zucchi, a favoured artist of Ferdinando I de' Medici at the end of the latter's cardinalate in Rome, now in the Uffizi, in Florence.

An early preparatory drawing for the work survives in the Princeton University Art Museum. It and The Silver Age were probably painted for Ferdinando, as they were recorded in his 'Guardaroba medicea' and then in 1635 at the Uffizi - at the latter date they were still together but misattributed to Federico Zuccari. Their correct attribution was later restored.

The two works' dimensions and status as panel not canvas paintings may mean they were originally intended as two elaborate covers for portraits. They have previously been linked with another Uffizi work on copper, previously entitled The Age of Iron but now known as The Rule of Jupiter or Hercules Musagetes on Olympus and thought to be a pair for a Death of Adonis on copper now in the Casa Vasari, Arezzo.
