= The Golden Year =

The Golden Year may refer to:

- The Golden Year (album), the sole album by the group Ou Est le Swimming Pool
- The Golden Year (BBC TV play), a musical comedy of 1951 starring Jack Hulbert

== See also ==
- Golden Years (disambiguation)
