= Yug =

Yug or YUG may refer to:

- Yug (river) (Russian: Юг), a river in the European part of Russia
- Yugh people, an indigenous group from central Siberia
- Yug language
- Yuga, a period of time in Hinduism
- Yug (TV series) (Hindi: युग), an Indian television series
- Yugoslavia, a former sovereign state in Europe
- YUG, currency code for the Yugoslav dinar in Serbia and Montenegro in 1994
- Azerbaijan State Theatre "Yuğ"

== See also ==
- Jug (disambiguation)
- Yuga (disambiguation)
