= Kaliyugaya =

Kaliyugaya may refer to:

- Kaliyugaya (novel), a 1957 novel by Martin Wickremasinghe
- Kaliyugaya (film), a 1981 Sri Lankan drama film, adapted from the novel

== See also ==
- Kalyug (disambiguation)
