= Jacopo Zucchi =

Italian painter (c. 1541 – c. 1590)

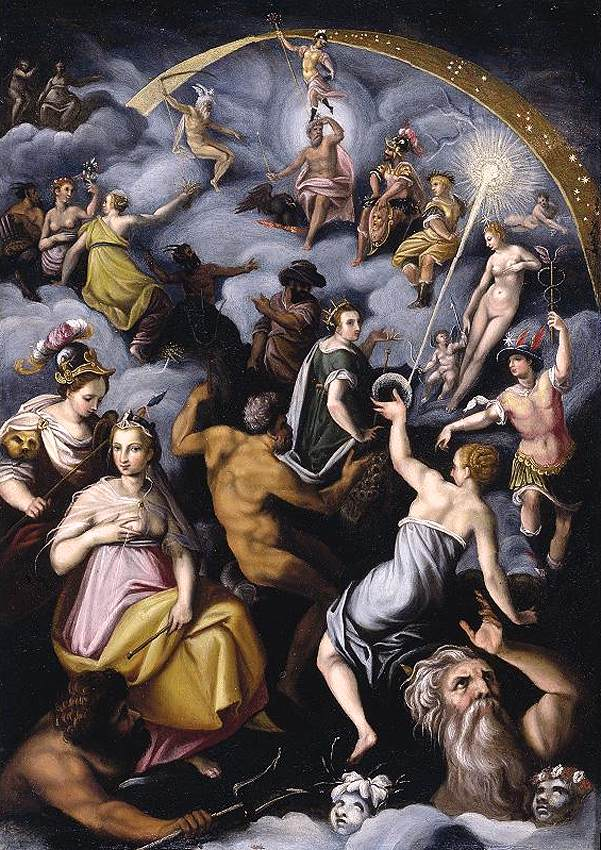
The Assembly of the Gods, 1575–1576. Oil on copper, 31 x 22 cm. Private collection

Jacopo Zucchi (c. 1541 – c. 1590) was a Florentine painter of the Mannerist style, active in Florence and Rome.

== Career ==
His training began in the studio of Giorgio Vasari, and he participated in the decoration of the Studiolo and the Salone dei Cinquecento in the Palazzo Vecchio. Moving to Rome in the early 1570s, he worked for Cardinal Ferdinando de' Medici in his Palazzo Firenze (1574), for whom he also probably produced the oil on panel paintings The Golden Age and The Silver Age (both c.1576–1581, both now in the Uffizi). He also helped decorate, along with his brother Francesco, the apse and dome of Santo Spirito in Sassia with a fresco of the Pentecost. He painted the grand salon of the former Rucellai (now Ruspoli) palace in Rome with mythologic genealogies. Two canvases, representing the Ascension and Resurrection, are housed in the church of San Lorenzo Martire in San Lorenzo Nuovo (Italy). His brother Francesco Zucchi became a noted mosaicist and died in 1621.

== Sources ==
- Freedberg, Sydney J. (1993). Pelican History of Art (ed.). Painting in Italy, 1500-1600. Penguin Books Ltd. pp. 650–51.
