= Middle Ages (disambiguation) =

The Middle Ages was a period in European history spanning the time from about the 5th to the 15th century (c. 476–1453).

Middle Ages or middle age may also refer to:

- Middle age, a stage of life
- Middle Age: A Romance, a 2001 novel by Joyce Carol Oates
- The Middle Ages (play), the play by A. R. Gurney
- Middle Ages (TV series), a 1992 American comedy-drama television series

Medieval or Mediaeval (the adjectival form of "Middle Ages") may refer to:

- Middle Ages, the European historical period from the 5th to the 15th century.
- Middle Ages in England

The term is also used to refer to periods in nations outside of Europe having similarities in social and military development, as seen in:

- History of Japan § Feudal Japan
- Medieval history of Sri Lanka
- Medieval India

- Medieval architecture, a term used to represent various forms of architecture popular in the Middle Ages
- Medieval music, the music tradition of Europe from 500 to 1500
- Medieval Times, an American dinner theater chain
- Medieval rock, modern (post-1980s) rock music tradition that use the Middle Ages as inspiration
- Medieval: Total War, a computer strategy game
- Medieval II: Total War, a 2006 computer strategy game by Microsoft that is a sequel to Medieval: Total War
- Medieval (film), a 2022 Czech film
- "Medieval", a song by James from the album Strip-mine
- "Medieval", a song by Diecast from the album Tearing Down Your Blue Skies

== See also ==
- MediEvil (series), a series of video games
