= Jug fishing =

Method of fishing that uses lines suspended from floating jugs

Jug Fishing Image

Jug fishing is an unlimited class tackle method of fishing that uses lines suspended from floating jugs to catch fish in lakes or rivers. Often, many jugs are used when jug fishing. In many states, a fisherman could use up to twenty, and jug sets of around twenty are common in practice. Jug fishing is most common in southern states of the US. Jugs are often put out at sunset and picked up at sunrise by the whole family. Jug fishing consists of a simple setup where lines are tied onto jugs and weights can be added to the line to keep the jug's location fixed. Jug fishing is also subjected to numerous state and local water regulations that could include: the number of jugs, dates and times when jug fishing is allowed, and if jug fishing is even allowed. Many fish can be caught on jugs, but the main target of jug fishing is often catfish.

== Regulations ==
Jug fishing is not permitted in many regions of the United States. Before jug fishing, a fisherman should check their state's regulations to see if jug fishing is allowed. Also, different bodies of water within a state may have different regulations regarding jug fishing. One must check the regulations for the specific state to avoid breaking the law.

=== By State ===
==== South Carolina ====
According to South Carolina Department of Natural Resources regulations, each jug must be free-floating. The jug's size must be at least one pint but no more than one gallon. Only one line may be attached to each jug. In order to fish with jugs, a permit is also required in some areas. The maximum number of jugs that is allowed to be used by one individual is 50. All jugs must also be marked with the individual's name and address.

Jug fishing is also limited to certain hours during the day. Jug may only be used up to one hour after official sunrise and can be placed back on the water no earlier than one hour before official sunset.

== Techniques ==
On average, a fisherman will use twenty or more jugs when fishing. A common set-up for these jugs is to use a two-liter bottle that has lines, hooks, weights, and bait attached to it. Two main strategies are usually employed when jug fishing, free floating jugs and fixed jugs.

=== Free Floating Jugs ===
When fishing free floating jugs, a fisherman will simply place jugs in the water that have hooks and lines attached to them, they have weights but are not anchored in place. The jug will then be free to move about in the water's current. Since this method allows the jug to drift through a large area of water, this method is useful when a fisherman is uncertain of the location of the fish. This method is very simple to set up. However, since the jugs are free to drift across the lake, the jugs are easy to lose (especially if a fish is hooked) if a fisherman does not pay close attention to the jugs. To prevent the loss of jug lines, many states require them to be manufactured from a white material so that they are easier to see. Some jug lines also have reflective or glow-in-the-dark tape around them so that they are visible at night.

=== Fixed Floating Jugs ===
When fishing with fixed floating jugs, a fisherman will place the jug in one location and fix the jug to that location by one of the following two ways. The first is by tying the jug to a branch, stump, or another fixed object on the water. The second way is by attaching large weights (approximately one to three pounds depending on the current in the water) to the bottom of the fishing line below the hook to keep the jug from moving. This method is particularly effective for catching large fish. Also, the jug will not become lost since it is fixed. However, since the jug is fixed, this now requires the fish to find the jug which is always an uncertainty.

== Guidelines ==
After the jugs have been placed in the water, a person will usually maneuver about the water in a boat to keep sight of the jugs. A jug will usually bob and weave in the water when a fish has been hooked. Jugs are usually baited with but not limited to shad, small fish, and nightcrawlers.

== Controversy ==
Jug fishing is a source of controversy. Critics contend that jug fishers over-harvest fish and do not promote sustainable fishing. However, each region has its own regulations concerning how many fish can be caught and how the fish can be caught. These regulations are designed to protect fish and provide a sustainable environment for the fish.
