= Jug II =

Coordinates: 45.547°N 18.716°E

- City district of Osijek
- Gradska četvrt Jug II; Jug II City District
- Interactive map of Jug II
- Country: Croatia
- City: Osijek

Government
  - President of Council: Krešimir Trtanj (HDSSB)

Population (2001)
  - Total: 14,020

Jug II is a city district of Osijek, Croatia. Located in the southeast of the city, in 2001 it had 14,020 inhabitants in 6,102 households. The district's name in Croatian literally means "South II". Jug II's day is on 30 May.

The district houses the Jug Sport Hall (Croatian: Športska dvorana Jug), an indoor arena with a capacity of 1,250 seats. It was opened in 2005. Following the example of this hall, in 2007 in Beli Manastir was built hall, which is almost the same to this hall.

== History ==
In the spring of 1967, the first inhabitants of the new district moved into completed buildings. In 1969, Opatijska Street and many apartment buildings in other streets were built, which increased the quality of life in that part of Osijek.
