= Dark Ages (1991 video game) =

1991 platform video game

- Developer: Scenario Software
- Publisher: Apogee Software
- Designer: Todd Replogle
- Artist: Allen H. Blum III
- Composer: Keith Schuler
- Platforms: MS-DOS, Windows, Mac OS
- Release: NA: February 1, 1991
- Genre: Platform
- Mode: Single-player

Dark Ages is a platform game written for MS-DOS, published by Apogee Software. It was the first shareware game to feature music for the AdLib sound card.

Dark Ages was distributed as shareware. It consists of three episodes, with only the first episode playable in the shareware version. The episodes are:

1. Prince of Destiny
2. The Undead Kingdom
3. Dungeons of Doom

The game was released as freeware on March 20, 2009.

== Plot ==
As a child, the Prince of the Great Kingdom was sent away by the power-hungry wizard Garth, to be raised by peasants. This turns out to be Garth's greatest mistake as one of the peasants is a retired hero who trains the Prince to be a master fighter using magic as a weapon. In the years after Garth's conquest, the kingdom had fallen into ruin and despair, with no hope of returning to the times of happiness and prosperity. Garth ruled with an iron fist and terrorized the population with undead creatures. The prince battles through badlands, castles, dungeons, caves, forests and finally to the Great Kingdom itself, with Garth's army of undead creatures attacking at every turn. After a confrontation between the Prince and Garth and after killing the evil wizard, the prince's destiny is fulfilled, having freed the kingdom from the Dark Ages of fear and tyranny. The prince assumes his rightful place as the peaceful King and Leader of the Kingdom. The Great Kingdom is once again free to prosper and grow without fear.

== Gameplay ==
Dark Ages is a side-scrolling game where the playable character, the prince, can move sideways, jump and shoot. Gameplay involves killing and avoiding enemies and jumping over obstacles. Progression to the next level often involves a hidden door, revealed by one of several Wise Men-type characters after retrieving an item for them. The items include a key, a shield, and an apple.

The player can use magic to fight the prince's enemies, starting out with a simple energy bolt and slowly gaining access to more destructive spells as the game progresses. There are three spells in the game: a blue bolt that flies straight forward, a boomerang that flies forward then returns allowing enemies to be hit twice, and a magic beam with a shorter range but can kill most enemies in one hit and can be fired in rapid succession.

== Development ==
When Todd Replogle first designed the game, the graphics were drawing slowly. With some aid from the Apogee members (who were still working for Softdisk at the time), the game was improved to run at a faster and smoother pace.
