= The Golden Age (Derain) =

Painting by André Derain

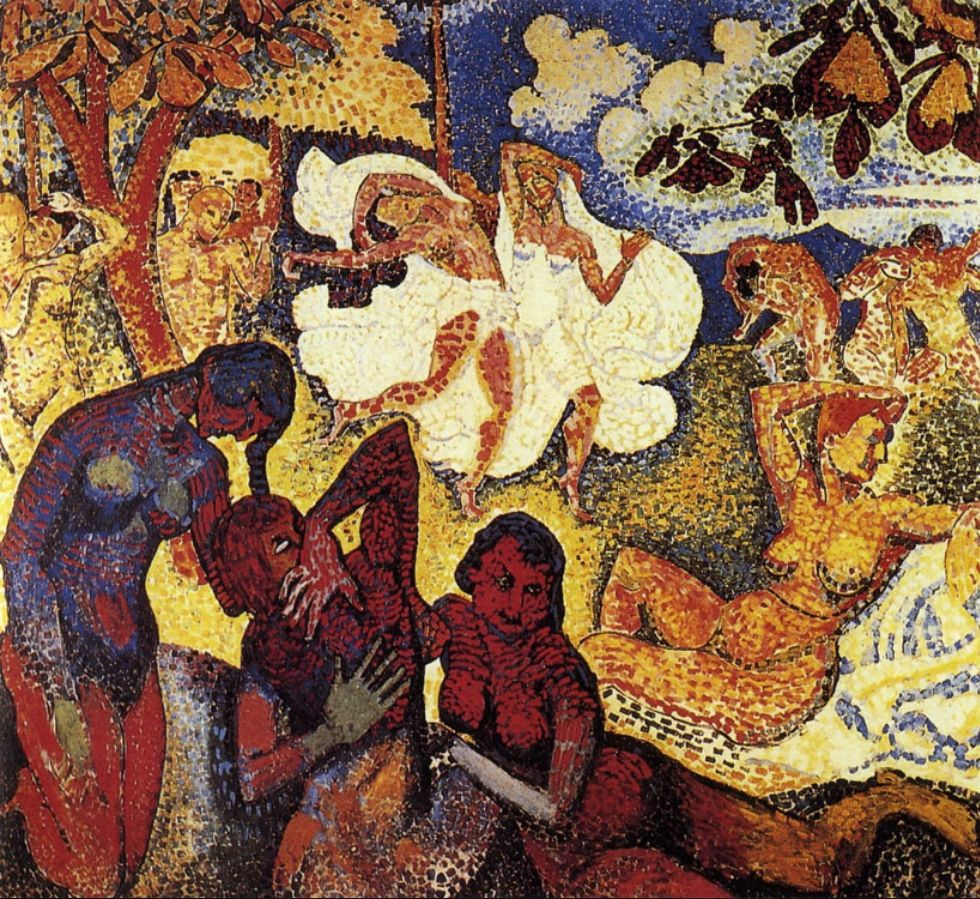
- Artist: André Derain
- Year: c. 1905
- Medium: oil on canvas
- Dimensions: 176.5 cm × 189.2 cm (69.5 in × 74.5 in)
- Location: Tehran Museum of Contemporary Art; Tehran

The Golden Age is an oil on canvas painting by the French artist André Derain, from c. 1905. Its a large format painting where Derain depicts several women engaged in various activities. It is held at the Tehran Museum of Contemporary Art.

== History and description ==
The work is to be placed at the beginning of the painter's fauvist period. In the partial use of pointillist and divisionist techniques, the artist is still under the influence of neo-impressionism, although his quest for a new style is also influenced by the primitivism of Paul Gauguin.

The composition of the painting shows different atmospheres. In the background unfolds a scene of seemingly joyful energy, with two women dancing half-naked and exuberantly. The luminosity of their flowing white garments in mid-motion draws the viewer's attention beyond a foreground that is shrouded in shadow. Around them are fully nude women, some appearing to be bathing, while others walk in the woods or rest in a clearing, sunbathing.

In the foreground, the scene has already changed dramatically. The atmosphere has darkened, becoming ominous. A woman appears petrified. She raises her arms as if to protect herself from unseen threats coming from the right, outside the frame. A second woman, worried and bewildered, approaches the woman who just raised the alarm. A third woman lowers her head, perhaps already feeling defeated by the imminent danger.

== Provenance ==
The contemporary art collection of the Tehran Museum of Contemporary Art, inaugurated in 1977, during the final years of the reign of Mohammad Reza Pahlavi, was assembled in a short time by two American curators, David Galloway and Donna Stein, and acquired with funds from the National Iranian Oil Company. It is now considered one of the most valuable and extensive collection of Western modern art outside Europe and the United States.

Some works in the collection are occasionally exhibited in public, but, given the explicit nature of the current painting, displaying topless women, Derain's work has never been shown to the Iranian public since the Islamic Revolution of 1979.
