= The Golden Years (play) =

The Golden Years is a radio play by Arthur Miller. It was written in 1940 but remained unperformed for many years. It was presented on BBC radio 3 in 1987 as a radio play.
