= Kalyug (novel) =

Cover of 2014 edition

Kalyug is the first novel of R. Sreeram to be published. Released in 2014 by Westland Press's Tranquebar imprint (ISBN 978-9384030650), Kalyug is about a fictional bloodless coup in India in 2012 following the death of a decorated war veteran, Major General Iqbal Qureshi. Drawing parallels from India of those days, Kalyug is part-satire, part-fiction and was noted for its subtle references to real-world incidents and characters.

== Summary ==
The death of a decorated war veteran, one of India's foremost military officials, triggers a chain of events that threatens to spiral out of control. The democratically elected government is overthrown and a new, fierce one is formed in its place.

Caught in the middle of Bala Murali Selvam, a writer still affected by his past persecution under the previous government. As the newly installed administration faces internal power struggles, external pressure, and conflicting agendas, Selvam becomes and unwilling participant in the unfolding political turmoil. Confronted with shifting loyalties and competing narratives, he is forced to reassess his long-held beliefs, including his sense of justice. The novel follows his attempts to navigate these circumstances and determine where he stand amid the uncertainty.

== Background ==
According to the author, Kalyug was inspired in part by the Emergency. There are also references to events that happened in 2012 and 2013, particularly the scams that exposed the contemporary government to a lot of ridicule.

== Reception ==
Kalyug has received good reviews from many readers on account of its fast pace, relevance and thought-provoking passages. Critics have pulled up the rather sudden ending, calling it clichéd in contrast to the unusual narrative that preceded it.
