= Yuga (disambiguation) =

Yuga is an age of time in Hinduism.

Yuga may also refer to:

== People ==
- El Lindaman (born 1995), Japanese professional wrestler, also called Yuga Hayashi
- Yuga Enomoto (榎本 悠雅; born 2000), Japanese handball player
- Yuga Furutani (古谷 悠河; born 2000), Japanese racing driver
- Yuga Kawada (川田 将雅; born 1985), Japanese jockey
- Yuga Watanabe (渡辺 悠雅; born 1996), Japanese footballer
- Yūga Yamato (大和 悠河; born 1977), Japanese former otokoyaku

== Characters ==
- Yuga Khan, a character in the series DC Comics

== Film ==
- Yuga (2006 film), an Indian Tamil-language film
- Yuga (2007 film), an Indian Kannada-language film
- Yuga Purusha, an Indian 1989 Kannada-language film
- Yuga Purushudu, a 1978 Indian Telugu-language action film
- Yuga Yugagale Saagali, a 2008 Indian Kannada-language romantic drama film

== Other uses ==
- Yuga Cycle, a cyclic age (epoch) in Hindu cosmology
- Yuga Purana, Sanskrit text and the last chapter of a Jyotisha
- A nickname for Yugoslavia

== See also ==
- Yug (disambiguation)
- Kalyug (disambiguation)
- Pudhu Yugam (disambiguation)
- Yugam (film), 2012 Indian Tamil-language film
