= Medieval rock =

Medieval rock may refer to:

- Medieval folk rock, a subgenre of British folk rock and progressive folk
- Medieval metal, a subgenre of folk metal
- Neo-medieval music, a modern popular music characterized by elements of medieval music and early music in general
