= Golden Time =

Golden Time may refer to:

- Golden Time (novel series), a Japanese light novel series
- Golden Time (TV series), a South Korean drama
- Golden Time, the 19:00–22:00 timeslot in Japanese television; see prime time
- Golden hour (medicine), also known as golden time, the time period following a traumatic injury where treatment has the highest chance of preventing death

== See also ==
- Golden Age (disambiguation)
