= Jug (surname) =

Jug is a surname. Notable people with the surname include:

- Ažbe Jug (born 1992), Slovenian football goalkeeper
- Klement Jug (1898–1924), Slovenian philosopher, essayist, and mountaineer
- Matej Jug (born 1980), Slovenian football referee
- Lord Toby Jug (born 1965), British politician
