= Casa Vasari, Arezzo =

Biographical museum in Tuscany, Italy

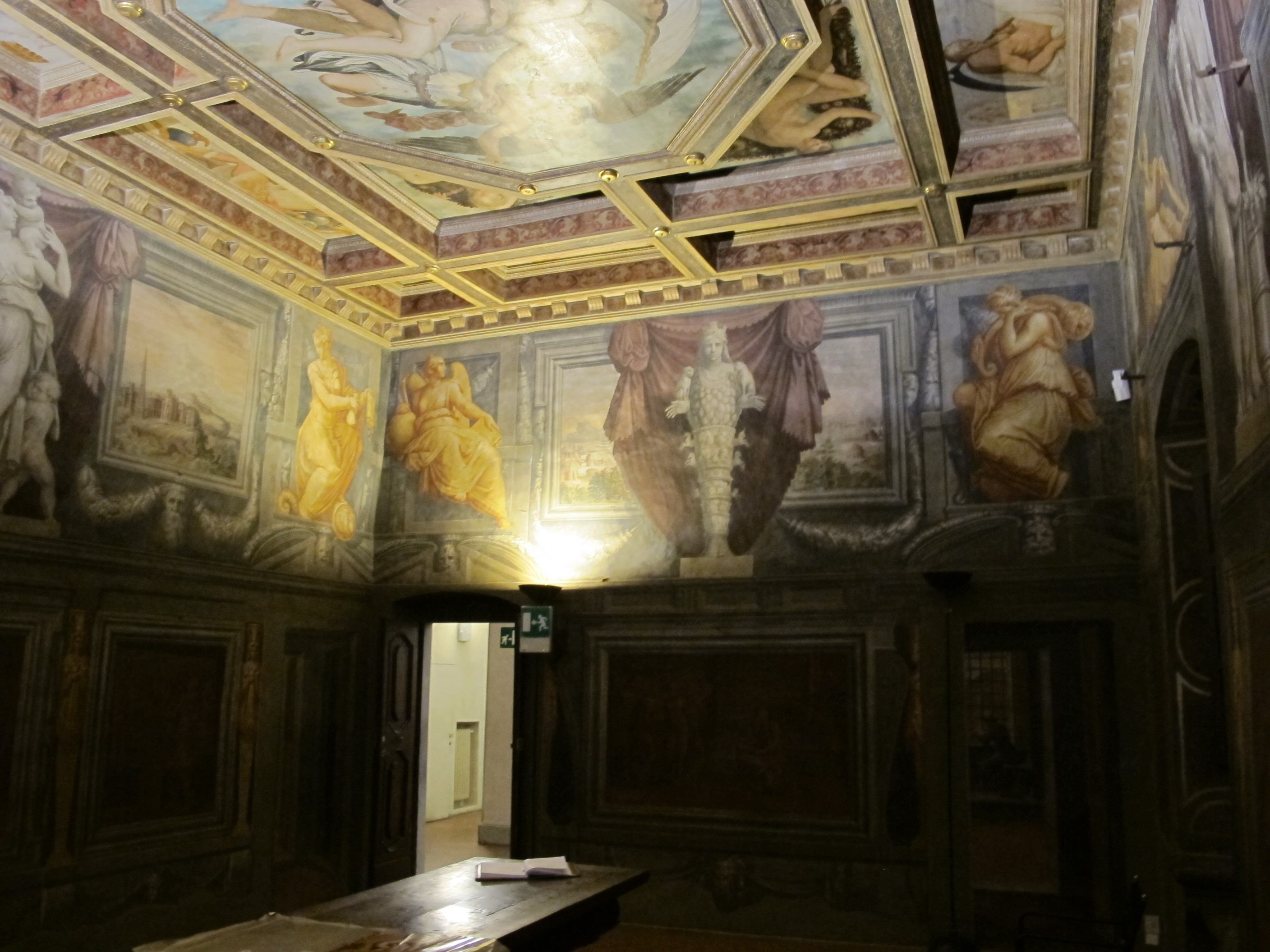
Casa Vasari, Arezzo

The Casa Vasari is a building at 55 via XX Settembre in Arezzo, Tuscany, Italy. It was the family home of the painter, art historian and architect Giorgio Vasari. It houses a number of frescoes and since December 2014 the Italian Ministry of Culture has run it through the Polo museale della Toscana, which was renamed the Direzione regionale Musei in December 2019. It houses the Archivio Vasariano.

== History ==
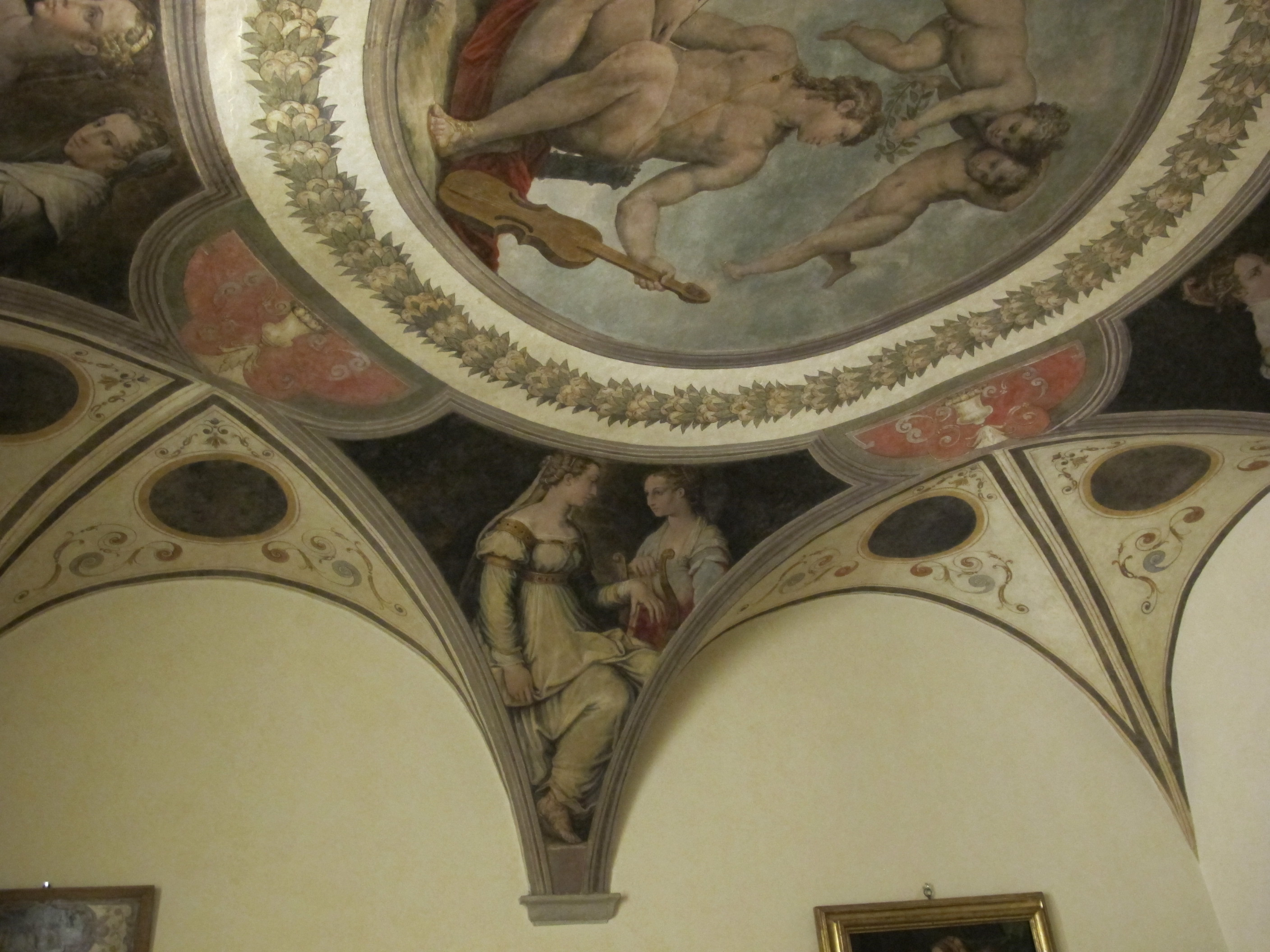
Sala delle Muse

Vasari acquired the house and the plot of land on which it lies in a contract dated 7 September 1541 and began decorating it the following year. In 1550 he married Niccolosa Bacci and moved into the building with her. Kept busy in Florence, Rome and on several journeys, he only lived in the house himself for short periods, perhaps intervening directly in works to complete and decorate it and acquire the initial nucleus of its furnishings (the latter now all lost). He also produced a plan for a facade completed in 1568.

One of the best-preserved examples of an artist's house and the Mannerist style in Tuscany, it passed down through Vasari's heirs until they went extinct in 1687, after which it passed to the Fraternita dei Laici, to the Brozzi family and then in 1871 to the Paglicci family, with the latter selling it to the state in 1911 to become a public museum. Initially displayed with Mannerist furniture and some works from the city and Fraternita collections, in the 1950s these were removed and replaced with a picture gallery of around sixty paintings by Vasari's collaborators and contemporaries from gallery collections in Florence, particularly works by "the studiolo painters", with the intention of setting up a museum on the Mannerist period. To mark the 500th anniversary of Vasari's birth, in 2011 the gallery was redisplayed and the visitor facilities upgraded.

== Bibliography ==
- (in Italian) Roberto Paolo Ciardi (ed.), Case di artisti in Toscana, Banca Toscana, 1998.
- (in Italian) Toscana. Guida d'Italia (Guida rossa), Touring Club Italiano, Milano 2003. ISBN 88-365-2767-1
