= Takuya Igarashi =

Japanese anime director

Takuya Igarashi (五十嵐 卓哉, Igarashi Takuya; born December 21, 1965) is a Japanese freelance storyboard artist and director who has worked for Toei Animation and currently Bones. He has also sometimes used the alias Jūgo Kazayama (風山 十五, Kazayama Jūgo).

== Anime involved in ==
Director

TV Series

| Title | Episodes | Involvement | First Run Start Date | First Run End Date | Notes |
|---|---|---|---|---|---|
| Sailor Moon: Sailor Stars | 34 | Episode Director/Storyboards (1, 7, 14, 21, 27, 34) | March 9, 1996 | February 8, 1997 | Sequel to Sailor Moon Super S |
| Ojamajo Doremi | 51 | Episode Director/Storyboards (4, 9, 15, 20, 25, 30, 36, 45) | February 7, 1999 | January 30, 2000 | Co-Directed with Junichi Sato |
| Ojamajo Doremi # | 49 | Episode Director/Storyboards (1, 9, 40) | February 6, 2000 | January 28, 2001 | Co-Directed with Shigeyasu Yamauchi Sequel to Ojamajo Doremi |
| Mo~tto! Ojamajo Doremi | 50 | Episode Director/Storyboards (1, 15, 25, 34, 45) | February 4, 2001 | January 27, 2002 | Sequel to Ojamajo Doremi # |
| Ojamajo Doremi Dokka~n! | 51 | Episode Director/Storyboards (1, 9, 23, 31, 38, 41, 51) | February 3, 2002 | January 26, 2003 | Sequel to Mo~tto! Ojamajo Doremi |
| Ashita no Nadja | 50 | Episode Director/Storyboards (1, 13, 24, 38, 44, 50) | February 2, 2003 | January 25, 2004 | |
| Ouran High School Host Club | 26 | Episode Director (1–2, 13, 26), Storyboards (1, 8, 13, 26) | April 4, 2006 | September 26, 2006 | |
| Soul Eater | 51 | Episode Director (1, 51), Storyboards (1, 4, 6, 15, 39, 51) | April 7, 2008 | March 30, 2009 | |
| Star Driver | 25 | Episode Director (25) Storyboards (1, 22, 25) | October 3, 2010 | April 4, 2011 | |
| Captain Earth | 25 | Episode Director (25), Storyboards (1–2, 5, 8, 13, 18, 22–23, 25) | April 5, 2014 | September 20, 2014 | |
| Bungo Stray Dogs | 12 | Episode Director (1–2), Storyboards (1–2, 6–7) | April 7, 2016 | June 23, 2016 | |
| Bungo Stray Dogs 2 | 12 | Episode Director (12) Storyboards (1–4, 12) | October 6, 2016 | December 22, 2016 | Sequel to Bungo Stray Dogs |
| Bungo Stray Dogs 3 | 12 | Episode Director (12) Storyboards (1–3, 12) Direction Cooperation (OP) | April 7, 2019 | June 28, 2019 | Third season of Bungo Stray Dogs |
| Bungo Stray Dogs 4 | 13 | Episode Director (13) Storyboards (1–3) | January 4, 2023 | March 29, 2023 | Fourth season of Bungo Stray Dogs |
| Bungo Stray Dogs 5 | 11 | Episode Director (11) Storyboards (2) | July 12, 2023 | September 20, 2023 | Fifth season of Bungo Stray Dogs |

Films

| Title | Runtime | First Run Start Date | Notes |
|---|---|---|---|
| Ojamajo Doremi #: The Movie | 30 Minutes | July 8, 2000 | Short Film for the Ojamajo Doremi # TV Series |
| Zatch Bell! Movie 2: Attack of Mechavulcan | 85 Minutes | August 6, 2005 | Second Zatch Bell! Film |
| Star Driver: The Movie | 150 Minutes | February 9, 2013 | Compilation film for Star Driver with added scenes |
| Bungo Stray Dogs: Dead Apple | 90 Minutes | March 3, 2018 | Sequel to Bungo Stray Dogs 2 |

Other

- Alien Nine: Episode Director (episodes 1, 3, 4)
- Futari wa Pretty Cure: Episode Director (episode 8)
- Goldfish Warning!: Episode Director, Assistant Unit Director (episodes 1–7 odd, 8, 11–12, 15–31 odd, 35–45 odd, 50)
- Mushishi: Storyboard (episodes 11, 24), Episode Director (episodes 11)
- Ojamajo Doremi Na-i-sho: Episode Director (episodes 1, 5, 9, 13)
- Sailor Moon: Episode Director (episodes 24, 35, 42), Assistant Episode Director
