= Yoshiyuki Asai =

Japanese anime director

Yoshiyuki Asai 浅井 義之
- Born: Japan
- Area: Anime director
- Notable works: Charlotte

Yoshiyuki Asai (浅井 義之, Asai Yoshiyuki) is a Japanese anime director. He is best known for directing the 2015 anime, Charlotte. Asai also featured as a guest at Anime Festival Asia 2015.

== Works ==
- Banner of the Stars (2000) - Key Animation (episode 7)
- Ah! My Goddess (2005) - Storyboard (episodes 11, 16, 22), Episode Direction (episodes 5, 11, 16, 22)
- Ah! My Goddess: Flights of Fancy (2006) - Storyboard (episodes 12, 19), Episodes Director (episodes 5, 12, 19)
- Aria: The Natural (2006) - Episode Director (episode 5)
- Angel Beats (2010) - Storyboard (episode 5)
- Charlotte (2015) - Series Director
- Fairy Tail (2009) - Storyboard (episodes 16, 25, 41, 94, 106, 114, 126, 131), Episode Direction (episodes 7, 16, 25)
- Fate/Apocrypha (2017) - Series Director
- The Day I Became a God (2020) - Series Director
- Buddy Daddies (2023) - Series Director
