= Luck Life =

Japanese musical group

- Origin: Osaka Prefecture, Japan
- Genre: Pop rock
- Years active: 2008–present
- Labels: Five Rats Records (2011–12); Highway Star (2013–15); Lantis (2016–present)
- Members: Pon; Ikoma; Taku; Love Oishi
- Website: luck-life.com

Luck Life (Japanese: ラックライフ, Hepburn: Rakku Raifu) is a J-pop band from Osaka Prefecture, Japan. From March 2007, they were known as "Maxim ☆ Tomato", until changing to their current name in Tokyo in 2008. Between 2013 and 2015, Luck Life was represented by Highway Star and at present by Lantis. The band is composed of Pon, Ikoma, Taku and Love Oishi.

== Story ==
The band was formed in 2005 by Pon, Ikoma, Taku, and Love Oishi during their high school days. In 2008, they moved to Tokyo and changed their name to Luck Life. Their first single, "Haruka Hikari," was released in 2014 under the label I Will Music of Highway Star. Their major debut single, "Namae wo Yobu yo," was released in May 2016 under Lantis.

Some of Luck Life's songs are featured for opening and ending themes of various anime, including Bungou Stray Dogs, Food Wars!: Shokugeki no Soma, and Tsurune.

== Band members ==
- Pon (Masumi Ueno; born September 7, 1988), vocalist, composer and guitar.
- Ikoma (Takahide Ikoma; born January 20, 1989), guitar.
- Taku (Takuya Kubo; born June 21, 1988), bass, vocalist.
- Love Oishi (Yutaka Ōishi; born October 24, 1988), drums.

== Discography ==
=== Albums ===
- World is you (2011, indie)
- Kimi no Koto (2012, indie)
- my contents (2013 indie)
- my contents (2014, indie)
- Tadashii Boku no Tsukurikata (2014, indie)
- Life is Beautiful (2017)
- Dear days (2018)

=== Mini albums ===
- Mr. (2009, indie)
- IT'S MY LIFE (2010, indie)
- Unbreakable (2019)

=== Singles ===
- "Sketchbook" (2008, indie)
- "Haruka Hikari (ハルカヒカリ)" (May 28, 2014, indie)
- "Aitoyuu (アイトユウ)" (April 22, 2015, indie)
- "Kawaranai Sora (変わらない空 Unchanging Sky)" (August 5, 2015, indie), ending theme of Junjō Romantica
- "Namae wo Yobu yo (名前を呼ぶよ Call Out a Name)" (May 11, 2016), ending theme of Bungo Stray Dogs
- "Hajime no Ippo (初めの一歩 First Step)" (July 27, 2016), opening theme of Cheer Boys!!
- "Kaze ga Fuku Machi (風が吹く街 City Where the Wind Blows)" (November 2, 2016), second ending theme of Bungo Stray Dogs
- "Refrain (リフレイン)" (August 23, 2017), ending theme of Saiyuki RELOAD BLAST
- "Bokura (僕ら We)" (February 28, 2018), ending theme song of Bungo Stray Dogs: Dead Apple
- "Symbol (シンボル)" (May 9, 2018), 2nd opening theme for the 3rd season of Food Wars!: Shokugeki no Soma
- "Naru" (November 14, 2018), opening theme of Tsurune: Kazemai High School's Kyūdō Club
- "Lily" (May 8, 2019), third ending theme of Bungo Stray Dogs
- "Aoiharu (アオイハル)" (May 6, 2020)

=== Digital singles ===
- "Anata wo (あなたを You)" (February 24, 2021)
- "MUSIC STAR" (April 28, 2021)
- "Ashita ni Nareba (明日になれば If Tomorrow Comes)" (June 30, 2021)
- "Hug" (August 25, 2021)
- "Hand" (August 1, 2022)
