= Zenrin-ji =

Zenrin-ji (禅林寺) is the name of a number of Japanese Buddhist temples.

- Eikan-dō Zenrin-ji, in Sakyō-ku, Kyoto
- Zenrin-ji (Ichinomiya), Ōbaku Zen temple in Ichinomiya, Aichi Prefecture
- Zenrin-ji (Fukui), a Sōtō temple in Fukui, Fukui Prefecture
- Zenrin-ji (Gifu), in Gifu, Gifu Prefecture
- Zenrin-ji (Nagasaki), a Rinzai temple in Nagasaki
- Zenrin-ji (Kunisaki), in Kunisaki, Ōita Prefecture
- Zenrin-ji (Mitaka), in Mitaka, Tokyo, an Ōbaku Zen temple where graves of Mori Ōgai and Osamu Dazai are situated
- Zenrin-ji (Hamura), a Rinzai temple in Hamura, Tokyo
- Zenrin-ji (Kainan), a Shingon temple in Kainan, Wakayama Prefecture
- Zenrin-ji (Taiwan), a Rinzai temple in Chiayi County, Taiwan
