= Otogi-zōshi (Dazai) =

1945 collection of short stories by Osamu Dazai

- First edition
- Author: Osamu Dazai
- Language: Japanese
- Genre: Short stories
- Publication date: 1945
- Publication place: Japan
- Media type: paperback
- Pages: 142
- ISBN: 978-4-9020-7540-3
- Preceded by: A Farewell with Regret
- Followed by: Winter's Firework

Otogi-zōshi (お伽草紙) is a Japanese collection of short stories by Osamu Dazai. In this work, the author is giving the reader a reinterpretation of classic Japanese fairy tales such as Urashima Taro, Tanuki and the Rabbit, Tale of a man with a wen and the Tongue-cut Sparrow, and gives the characters a new dimension which go against the national spirit which the Imperial Japanese Government was trying to foster.

The title itself is reference to Otogi-zōshi, a group of about 350 Japanese prose narratives, in which many of the stories Osamu Dazai has written of here appear.

In this collection of fairy tales Osamu Dazai explores a number of themes which are recurrent in his work and which are likewise explored in his more famous works, such as No Longer Human and The Setting Sun. The themes explored include: the idea of not being understood, emotional deadness of male-female ties, suspicion that things will go wrong, acceptance of one's fate and resignation.

== Summary ==
Otogi-zōshi is a series of four fairy tales told by a father to his child, while they are hiding in a trench serving as bomb shelter during the 1945 air raids of Tokyo.

- A Man and His Wen: Author begins the work by saying he's unable to confirm the veracity of the tale as he cannot access the necessary literature from the bomb shelter. This could be interpreted as a criticism of the Imperial Japanese Government for forcing their citizens to hide, and stopping academic activity. The story begins by a description of the protagonist as a lonely alcoholic with a respectable wife and a son nicknamed "The Saint" for his virtuous life. The old man dislikes both of them. One day the man goes to collect firewood. He starts drinking and is soon forced to take shelter in an old, hollowed out, tree, where he falls asleep. Upon waking up in the evening, the man sees a group of oni dancing and drinking. He dances for them, and the oni take the wen from cheek, thinking it will force him to come back again. Upon returning home, his family is indifferent to the disappearance of the wen. An old, rich man in the neighborhood wants his removed as well, but his frantic dancing scares the oni off, and they, in fear, leave him the other wen on his cheek as well. The story is concluded by the author saying: "...although not a single instance of wrongdoing occurs in the story, people end up unhappy."
- Urashima Taro: Urashima Taro is the respected eldest brother of two siblings. Meets a talking tortoise he rescued from a group of children earlier. They have a talk regarding refinement and people's criticism. The tortoise offers to take Taro to the Dragon Palace, saying: There's no caviling criticism in the Dragon Palace, only an eternal smile of acceptance". Taro goes and is teased by the tortoise throughout. In the palace he meets Oto-hime and hears the song she's playing on the harp called "Divine Resignation", which, according to the tortoise, by no means to be confused with giving up. After relaxing at the palace for a time, Taro returns to the surface. There he opens a shell given to him by the princess, and instantly turns 300 years old. The author consider this old age to be a mercy.
- Tanuki and the Bunny: Tanuki is taken by and old couple to be made into stew. Escapes by scratching the old woman's hand. Tells of this to a bunny he loves, who berates him for escaping. The bunny hates the tanuki for being old and ugly. Bunny is described as an Artemisian, young, vengeful maiden. Tricks the tanuki, sets him on fire, slathers red paste on his wounds, and drowns him by tricking him into a mud boat. The author concludes with: "Inside every woman is a merciless bunny, and inside every man a virtuous tanuki who's forever floundering as he tries to keep his head above water".
- Tongue-cut Sparrow: Protagonist a man useless to society who one day rescues a sparrow. The sparrow talks to the man and criticizes him for being useless. Man's wife, jealous of the sparrow, tears its tongue out. Man searches for the bird and finds her in the sparrow inn. Returning from it, he refuses wicker baskets, as he does not like carrying heavy things. His wife goes to the inn as well, but dies in the snow returning, under the weight of the gold filled wicker baskets.
