= The Flowers of Buffoonery =

1935 Japanese novella

- Author: Osamu Dazai
- Original title: 道化の華
- Language: Japanese
- Genre: Novella
- Publisher: Nihon romanha
- Publication date: May 1935
- Publication place: Japan

The Flowers of Buffoonery (道化の華, Dōke no Hana) is a 1935 Japanese novella by Osamu Dazai. Initially titled The Sea (海, Umi) in an early draft Dazai shared with friends, the work was first published in the short-lived coterie journal Nihon romanha and has been described as a "major contribution" to the magazine. In 1936, the novella was included in Dazai's first book-length fiction collection The Final Years. The story shares a protagonist with Dazai's novel No Longer Human (1948), which it preceded by thirteen years.

== Synopsis ==
In late December, the day after a suicide pact, twenty-something artist Ōba Yōzō awakens at a seaside sanatorium for tuberculosis patients and finds his lover Sono did not survive. A young nurse named Mano, whose face is marked with a noticeable scar, is assigned to care for him. His friends Hida and Kosuge travel down to visit, spending the night in a neighboring room. Though they crack jokes and cause a stir at the hospital, they privately wonder if Yōzō is as well as he seems.

The next day, Yōzō's older brother arrives from their hometown far in the north and chides him for the trouble he's caused their family. He insists that the friends stay with him on nearby Enoshima. Later that night, Kosuge comes back to the hospital stinking of alcohol. Mano tells Yōzō and Kosuge a ghost story about seeing a phantom crab while keeping vigil with a dead patient. When Kosuge notices similarities to the sanatorium, Mano backpedals and says the story was made-up.

It snows the following day. Yōzō tries to sketch the ocean and is disappointed with the result. His friend Hida returns from speaking with the police with Yōzō's brother and announces that Yōzō is being charged with aiding suicide, although Sono's husband doesn't seem committed to the case. To steer the situation, Yōzō's brother has given him ¥200 (equivalent to ¥129,485 in 2024) and got him to sign a letter absolving their family from further responsibility.

On the fourth day, the sanatorium director gives Yōzō a clean bill of health and directs Mano to remove his bandages. The three friends take a walk along the shore, so that Yōzō can point out the cliff that he and Sono jumped from.

That night, Mano keeps Yōzō awake, telling him about the origins of the scar on her face. Just before dawn, they put on warm clothes and set off on a hike up the hill behind the sanatorium, which overlooks the coast. Their hope is to catch a glimpse of Mt. Fuji, but from the hilltop, it is too cloudy to see.

== Style ==
The Flowers of Buffoonery is narrated in the third-person, but the narrator, a self-conscious writer, makes frequent first-person asides, breaking the fourth wall as he comments on the quality or believability of the novel he is writing. At times the unnamed writer calls the book a masterpiece, while at other times he grumbles and dismisses it as the work of a hack. It has been observed that Dazai adapted this metafictional technique from the work of French novelist André Gide, an influence which Dazai names explicitly in an open letter penned to Yasunari Kawabata.

The narrator of The Flowers of Buffoonery uses the masculine first-person pronoun "Boku" (僕) to refer to himself. In contrast, the unnamed narrator of the foreword and afterword to No Longer Human uses the gender-neutral personal pronoun "Watashi" (私), while the character named Ōba Yōzō in that work refers to himself in his portion of the narrative using the reflexive pronoun "Jibun" (自分).

== Reception ==
The style and tone of the book have elicited various reactions. Donald Keene, a translator of Dazai's novels No Longer Human and The Setting Sun, praises The Flowers of Buffoonery as the first work in which "Dazai's mordant humor was a well-established part of his style." Author and critic Takako Takahashi, who cites Dazai as an influence, has dismissed as "unmanly" and "gratuitous" the asides in which the writer-narrator bemoans the quality of the story he is writing.

Others have applauded Dazai as a "violator of conventions," noting how the narrator of The Flowers of Buffoonery "intrudes in the novel and comments on the autobiographical plot, exposing the fact that it is fictional." It has been argued that this ironic handling of the story highlights "the complex and perhaps ridiculous nature of autobiographical fiction" and that "this playful self-mockery exonerates the often despairing tone of Dazai's works, while also making them more effective as autobiography"

The story has been described as a comment on the futility of taking one's own life, with some critics suggesting that Dazai's "focus on the comical, embarrassing, and grotesque aspects" of suicide make the prospect of killing oneself appear as "meaningless, bleak and absurd as life itself."

In the September 1935 issue of Bungei Shunjū, novelist Yasunari Kawabata offered a critical appraisal of the novella, writing that the work "embodies the lifestyle and literary perspectives of its maker, though in my personal opinion, a dark cloud surrounds the author that regrettably prevents a full expression of his talents." The next month, Dazai published a response to Kawabata in Bungei Tsūshin, a periodical owned by the Bungei Shunjū parent company, in which Dazai calls Kawabata a liar and argues that the author's criticisms amount to a "twisted...Dostoyevskian" form of love.

== Translations ==
The first translation, into Italian, was published in 1990 by Lolli Santini in the journal Il Giappone. A French version by Juliette Brunet and Yuko Brunet was included in their book-length translation of The Final Years in 1997. The novella was first translated into Russian by Tatiana Sokolova-Delyusina in 2004, as part of a collection of selected works, and again in 2018, as a standalone book translated by Dimitry Ragozin. South Korean translator Roh Jae-myung published a Korean translation in a 2005 collection Woman's Duel, which takes its title from a different Dazai story also included in the volume. A Chinese translation was published by Taiwanese translator Liu Tzu-Chien in 2017. A Spanish translation was published by Argentinian translator Matías Chiappe Ippolito in 2023. An English translation by Sam Bett was released in 2023.

== See also ==
- No Longer Human
- The Final Years
- Fourth wall
