= List of Hozuki's Coolheadedness episodes =

Cover of the first DVD volume released by King Records.

Hozuki's Coolheadedness is a supernatural dark comedy Japanese animated series based on the 2011 manga series written and illustrated by Natsumi Eguchi. The story follows the title character, Hozuki, a demon ogre who works for the god of death, King Enma, as a supervisor in the Japanese Hell. The series is episodic, and in each episode the serious-minded Hozuki attempts to manage and troubleshoot unusual problems which occur there.

A thirteen-episode first season was produced by Wit Studio and directed by Hiro Kaburaki, with screenplay by Midori Gotō and characters design by Hirotaka Katō. It was broadcast on Mainichi Broadcasting System between January 10, 2014, and April 4, 2014. (Note: As stated on the official website, Hozuki's Coolheadedness officially premiered on January 9, 2014 at 25:35 i.e. January 10, 1:35 AM. This technically resulted in the episodes airing on the days following the ones scheduled.) It was later aired on television networks TBS, CBC, BS-TBS, TVK and AT-X, and streamed on Bandai Channel, Video Market, Docomo Anime Store, Niconico and ShowTime. The entire season was released by King Records from April 9 to August 13, 2014, on DVD and Blu-ray. Crunchyroll simulcasted the season with English subtitles in the United States, Canada, the United Kingdom, South Africa, Australia and New Zealand. Sentai Filmworks licensed the season for home media release in North America, and Madman Entertainment did the same for the Australian region.

A second season was produced by Studio Deen with a new director, Kazuhiro Yoneda, and character designer, Jirō Omatsuri, but with the same writer, Midori Gotō. It was broadcast on Tokyo MX between October 8, 2017, and July 1, 2018. (Note: As stated on the official website, the second season of Hozuki's Coolheadedness officially premiered on October 7, 2017 at 1:00 "late night" (深夜) i.e October 8, 1:00 AM. This technically resulted in the episodes airing on the days following the ones scheduled.) (Note: As stated on the official website, the second cour of the second season of Hozuki's Coolheadedness officially premiered on April 7, 2018 at 1:00 "late night" (深夜) i.e April 8, 1:00 AM. This technically resulted in the episodes airing on the days following the ones scheduled.) It also aired on television networks Sun Television, BS11, KBS and AT-X, and streamed on AbemaTV, Amazon Prime Video, Hulu, Rakuten TV, U-Next, Softbank Anime, Flat Dōga, Anime Store, Docomo Anime Store, Niconico, Bandai Channel, Video Market and Gyao. Sentai Filmworks licensed the season for home media and digital release in North America. Sentai's website Hidive simulcasted the season with English subtitles in the United States, Canada, the United Kingdom, Ireland, South Africa, Australia and New Zealand.

The series uses eight pieces of theme music: three opening themes and five ending themes. The opening theme for the first season is "Jigoku no Sata mo Kimi Shidai" (地獄の沙汰も君次第), which is interpreted by the series' main cast members under the name Jigoku no Sata All Stars (地獄の沙汰オールスターズ, Jigoku no Sata Ōru Sutāzu; lit. 'Hell's Judgment All Stars'). The main ending theme for the same season is "Parallax View" (パララックス・ビュー, Pararakkusu Byū) by Sumire Uesaka. Additionally, "Okina Kingyo no Ki no Shita de" (大きな金魚の樹の下で) by Tokyo Philharmonic Chorus and "Caramel Momo Jam 120%" (キャラメル桃ジャム120%, Kyarameru Momo Jamu 120 Pāsento) by Uesaka are used as the ending themes for episode 1 and 8 respectively. The second season's opening theme is "Dai! '"Jigo Jigo Bushi" (大!地獄地獄節) by Jigoku no Sata All Stars, and the ending is "Riverside Lovers" (リバーサイド・ラヴァーズ, Ribāsaido Rabazu) by Uesaka. The second half of the second season had the opening theme "Haikei, Jigoku Yori" (拝啓、地獄より) by Jigoku no Sata All Stars, and the ending theme "Jigoku de Hot Cake" (地獄でホットケーキ, Jigoku de Hotto Kēki) by Uesaka.

== Episode list ==
=== Season 1 (2014) ===
No. (Note: Each episode is divided into two parts: A and B.)	Official English title (Note: All English titles are taken from Crunchyroll and Hidive; it is indicated when they differ.) Original Japanese title	Original airdate
1	"Making or Breaking Hell"; Transliteration: "Jigoku Ō Ichiban" (Japanese: 地獄大一番)	January 10, 2014
1	"The Discovery of Hell's Mysteries"; Transliteration: "Jigoku Fushigi Hakken" (Japanese: 地獄不思議発見)	January 10, 2014
Hozuki is tasked to solve the many problems of Hell. He encounters a problem man named Momotaro, who was a famous ogre slayer when he was alive. Hozuki's love or goldfish plants is revealed. He and King Enma discuss the animals of Australia, pets, and the kind of girl Hozuki likes.
2	"Demons and Underwear and Crabs"; Transliteration: "Oni to Pantsu to Kani" (Japanese: 鬼とパンツとカニ)	January 17, 2014
2	"The State of Hell, and This and That"; Transliteration: "Jigoku no Sata to Are ya Kore" (Japanese: 地獄の沙汰とあれやこれ)	January 17, 2014
Nasubi and Karauri talk about the importance of underwear while cleaning the bank of the Sanzu River. Hozuki goes to supervise them, and while Hozuki and Karauri are distracted discussing several belongings spread along the river, Nasubi sees a giant crab attacking people. Satan, the European King of Hell, visits the Japanese Hell while secretly plans to spy and later dominate it. While on a tour through the Hell accompanied by Hozuki, Satan gets scared by Hozuki for the way he treats Enma. Satan also gets astonished to have to eat goldfish plants; he ends up liking the culture shock. However, Satan runs away from the Japanese Hell when, while spying Hozuki's room, sees that Hozuki needs a "Satan" to create a panacea. When Satan leaves, Hozuki notices he wrote "Santa" wrong.
3	"Hakutaku"; Transliteration: "Hakutaku" (Japanese: 白澤)	January 24, 2014
3	"How Their Discord Came to Be"; Transliteration: "Ikani Shite Karera no Kakushitsu wa Umareta ka" (Japanese: いかにして彼らの確執は生まれたか)	January 24, 2014
Shiro wants Hozuki's opinion on which to buy to his superior's wedding. King Enma informs he is sleeping after two days of consecutive work and recommends Shiro to buy a peach of immortality at Shangri-La. There, Momotaro works in the shop of Hakutaku, a Kampo medicine expert and Hozuki's old enemy. Momotaro compares Hozuki to Hakutaku and enrages Hozuki, which leads King Enma to explain their disaffection. A thousand years ago, Hozuki and Hakutaku were referees at the Japanese-Chinese Good Will Games. During the break time, they did a wager in which Hakutaku bet the first woman leave the privy would have a great bust and Hozuki bet she would have not. The first person to leave the privy has a great bust but they are uncertain if it is a woman or a man; the second, on contrary, is certainly a woman with a small bust. This led them to an impasse that never ended.
4	"Pretty Boys Need Love Too"; Transliteration: "Binan ni mo Iroiro Aru" (Japanese: 美男にもいろいろある)	January 31, 2014
4	"Kajika Hell" (Crunchyroll) / "The Crackling Hell" (Hidive); Transliteration: "Kachi-kajigoku (Note: The title is a pun on Kachi-kachi Yama and "Jigoku" (Japanese for hell))" (Japanese: かちかぢごく)	January 31, 2014
Hozuki and Shiro take an Oboroguruma, a flying taxi, to the Crow-Tengu Police Station. In the taxi they meet Oiwa Chochin. When something collides into the vehicle, a policeman reveals they are chasing Tamiya Iemon, Oiwa's husband. Oiwa goes after Iemon and Hozuki knocks them down by throwing his iron club, and they are taken by police. At the police station, Hozuki reports to Yoshitsune Minamoto, the commander of the Crow-Tengu, that he was selected to be featured in a poster for the Hell Festival of Lights. As Hozuki feels new employees are too lazy on their work of torture, he takes them on a tour across the Hell. After the tour, Hozuki tell them the Kachi-kachi Yama story, in which a rabbit kills a tanuki, avenging an old woman who was killed by the tanuki. The rabbit of the story appears as asked by Hozuki to show some torture methods.
5	"The Instrumental Duo of the Mighty Rivals"; Transliteration: "Ryūko no Nijūsō" (Japanese: 龍虎の二重奏)	February 7, 2014
5	"Mental Sports Day"; Transliteration: "Seishin-teki Undōkai" (Japanese: 精神的運動会)	February 7, 2014
Hozuki and Hakutaku are making their recipes in Hell and in Shangri-La respectively when they notice there is an ingredient missing. Both of them go to the limits between Hell and Shangri-La as they need something from the Hell's gatekeepers and meet. During the Sports Day in Hell, Hozuki takes advantage of the event to discipline the new employees. It starts with a treasure hunting in which the players are required to do embarrassing tasks to win and includes another 106 events.
6	"Hell Idol: Peach Make" (Crunchyroll) / "Hell Idol: Peach Maki" (Hidive); Transliteration: "Ryūko no Nijūsō" (Japanese: 龍虎の二重奏)	February 14, 2014
6	"The Right Arm Blues"; Transliteration: "Migi Ude no Burūsu" (Japanese: 右腕のブルース)	February 14, 2014
The idol, Peach Maki, is introduced. She tells journalist Koban, who specializes in gossip, to never go near her so Koban then sets his eyes on Hozuki as his future scoop. Hozuki finds himself sitting next to Peach Maki on a train. Beelzebub, Satan's right hand man, visits Japanese Hell.
7	"Man and Woman and Mortal Hell"; Transliteration: "Otoko to Onna to Shugō Jigoku" (Japanese: 男と女と衆合地獄)	February 21, 2014
7	"Hell-Style Acupunture and Moxibustion Techniques and How-to Use the Johari Mirror" (Crunchyroll) / "How-to Use the Johari Mirror" (Hidive); Transliteration: "Jigoku-shiki Shinkyū-jutsu to Jōhari Kamera no Tsukaikata" (Japanese: 地獄式鍼灸術と浄玻璃鏡の使い方)	February 21, 2014
Hozuki and Oko take Karauri and Nasubi on a tour of Mortal Hell, the hell for those who commit sexual-related crimes. King Enma's back begins to hurt and Hozuki attempts to cure him.
8	"The Vulgar Battle"; Transliteration: "Egetsunaki Tatakai" (Japanese: えげつなき戦い)	February 28, 2014
8	"The 36 Views of Hell"; Transliteration: "Jigoku Sanjūrokkei" (Japanese: 地獄三十六景)	February 28, 2014
Peach Maki releases a new CD. Hozuki and Peach Maki run into each other and Koban attempts to get some gossip out of their encounter. Nasubi is shown to be an amazing carver. However, Nasubi feels like his pizzazz is missing. A 200-year-old mural is falling apart so Hozuki asks Nasubi to repaint the mural.
9	"The Ultimate Example of Ruin Through Wine and Women"; Transliteration: "Sake to Onna de Dameninaru Kyūkyoku no Rei" (Japanese: 酒と女でダメになる究極の例)	March 7, 2014
9	"Awash with Drunks" (Crunchyroll) / "Awash with Drunks who Came Home" (Hidive); Transliteration: "Afure Kaettekita Yopparai" (Japanese: 溢れ返ってきたヨッパライ)	March 7, 2014
Hakutaku goes to Mortal Hell to drink and runs into Hozuki. Hozuki sets off to fix a problem in Screaming Hell, the hell for violent drunkards. The deceased there have stolen sake from Orochi, the eight-headed dragon.
10	"Dinner of the Ten Kings of the Afterlife"; Transliteration: "Jū Ō no Bansan" (Japanese: 十王の晩餐)	March 14, 2014
10	"Diets are Hell"; Transliteration: "Daietto wa Jigoku Mitaina Mono" (Japanese: ダイエットは地獄みたいなもの)	March 14, 2014
Hozuki helps out at Abbreviated Hell, where criminals who were given a proper burial and sacrifices are deemed worthy enough to go to Heaven or be reincarnated, once they suffer one punishment. Hozuki then goes off for a get-together with the Ten Kings of the Afterlife. King Enma is out of shape and fatter. Hozuki decides to help him lose weight and go on a diet.
11	"The Samurai Who Was Inch High" (Crunchyroll) / "The Samurai Who Was Once Inch High" (Hidive); Transliteration: "Issun Datta Hōshi" (Japanese: 一寸だった法師)	March 21, 2014
11	"Marsh Sisters on the Mountain" (Crunchyroll) / "The Quagmire Sisters on the Mountain" (Hidive); Transliteration: "Oyama no Doronuma Shimai" (Japanese: お山の泥沼姉妹)	March 21, 2014
Hozuki reads the story of Inch-High Samurai to Shiro's nieces and nephews. They find out that the samurai is in Hell because he lied to gain the love of a princess. After beating an ogre, the samurai grew to the regular human size, which dissatisfied him as he lost his outstanding characteristic and became "normal," leading to him having a psychopathic breakdown. Kodama, a tree spirit of the mountain, tells Hozuki he cannot stay there because Princess Rock, the daughter of the Mountain God, is terrorizing the place. Princess Rock haunts beautiful women since she was called "ugly" by Ninigi-no-Mikoto, who chose to marry her sister, the Princess Blossom, over her.
12	"Lady Lilith and Her Husband"; Transliteration: "Redi Ririsu to Sono Otto" (Japanese: レディ・リリスとその夫)	March 28, 2014
12	"Why Monsters Are so Widely Spread Throughout the Mundane World of China" (Crunchyroll) / "Why Monsters Are so Widely Spread Throughout Mundane China" (Hidive); Transliteration: "Chūgoku Utsushiyo ni Yōkai ga Hiromatta Wake" (Japanese: 中国現世に妖怪が広まった訳)	March 28, 2014
Lady Lilith, a pretty Western she-devil married to Beelzebub, pays a visit to King Enma. When Hozuki takes her around Japanese Hell, Lady Lilith attempts to make a move on him so Hozuki introduces her to Hakutaku - and both get along. Beelzebub, frustrated by Hozuki telling him about Lilith and Hakutaku, challenges Hozuki to prove his superiority. Hakutaku tells Momotaro and Hozuki the story of a book of paintings. 4000 years ago, Hakutaku was too drunk and fell in front of the Yellow Emperor who captured him. To be released Hakutaku offered information about 11,520 monsters and the emperor created a monster guide with his help. Hozuki recalls he was visiting China for afterlife research when he met someone and challenged them to a drink for information - Haukutaku - the reason he was so drunk.
13	"Hell's Bon Festival of Lights"; Transliteration: "Urabon Jigoku-sai" (Japanese: 盂蘭盆地獄祭)	April 4, 2014
13	"Idle Chat with the Great King Enma"; Transliteration: "Zatsudan Enma Daiō" (Japanese: 雑談閻魔大王)	April 4, 2014
It's time for Hell's Bon Festival. All the workers get this time off to celebrate at the festival. Hozuki, Kakisuke, Shiro, and Rurio walk around the festival and enjoy the booths. Hozuki chats with King Enma.

=== Season 2 (2017–18) ===
No.	No. in season	Official English title (Note: All English titles are taken from Hidive.) Original Japanese title	Original airdate
1	14	"Ancient Underworld Overhaul"; Transliteration: "Jindai Anoyo Kakumei" (神代あの世革命)	October 8, 2017
1	14	"The Palace with the Malice"; Transliteration: "Uramitsurami Atte Koso" (恨みつらみあってこそ)	October 8, 2017
Hozuki recalls his past: he was a human child orphan in a village that went through a rainless period and the villagers sacrificed him. However, onibi entered his body and he became a demon. Later, Enma was surveying people on what to change in the Afterlife and met Hozuki, who impressed Enma and brought him to replace his first Chief of Staff, Izanami. Izanami wants Hozuki to redesign her palace's entrance - it has pillars with the villagers who sacrificed Hozuki chained to them. As Izanami despises his artistic preferences, Hozuki delegates the task to Nasubi.
2	15	"Hell Minion for a Day"; Transliteration: "Taiken Tsuitachi Gokusotsu" (体験一日獄卒)	October 15, 2017
2	15	"The Line Between Workaholic and Artist"; Transliteration: "Wākahorikku to Takumi no Sakai" (ワーカホリックと匠の境)	October 15, 2017
Hozuki brings the idol duo Maki-Miki to work as Hell minions for a day and enlists Koban to take photos that will serve as publicity for Hell. Then Hozuki visits Hell's record department and meets with their manager, Hageito, who explains to Nasubi and Karauri the records are collected by creatures known as Kushojin and that the department's employees hand-write a final account based on it. Because of the stressful nature of the job, Hozuki advises counseling services to the department.
3	16	"The Auspicious Alliance"; Transliteration: "Zuichō Renmei" (瑞兆連盟)	October 22, 2017
3	16	"Quirky Off-the-Wall Creatures"; Transliteration: "Ekisentorikku Fushigi Yōkai" (エキセントリック不思議妖怪)	October 22, 2017
Kirin and Ho-oh, the other two Divine (Good Luck) Beasts gather at Hakutaku's shop and Hakutaku introduces Momotaro to them. Then a day in the life of the Zashiki Warashi is explored. They decide they want names of their own instead of just being addressed by the name of their species - Zashiki Warashi - so Hozuki names them.
4	17	"The Legend of Mustard"; Transliteration: "Karashi-chan Densetsu" (芥子ちゃん伝説)	October 29, 2017
4	17	"Please Turnip for the Demon Parade"; Transliteration: "Kabura-shiki Hyakkiyakō" (蕪式百鬼夜行)	October 29, 2017
Koban attempts to collect money Gon borrowed from him, but when the fox demon doesn't have it, proposes an information trade and tells him Mustard, the Rabbit from Crackling Mountain, is in Hell, so Koban goes to her for an interview. She tells him the story of how she went from being a rabbit who killed the Tanuki to a Hell Minion. Halloween comes to the mortal world and the beings of the afterlife celebrates the holiday, each in their own way. Hoozuki becomes frustrated when everyone insists on celebrating Halloween according to the modern style of pumpkins and a "cosplay fest" instead of the traditional manner.
5	18	"Ono no Takamura"; Transliteration: "Ono no Takamura" (小野篁)	November 5, 2017
5	18	"Stories of Great King Enma"; Transliteration: "Enma Daiō to Itsuwa" (閻魔大王と逸話)	November 5, 2017
Hozuki visits Shinko, the first of the Ten Kings of the Afterlife, and Ono Takamura, his Chief of Staff, to deliver a package from Enma. They speak about how Takamura, as a drunken human, wandered into a well connected to Hell and ended up helping there when he was mistaken as a demon. He and Hozuki briefly switched places with Takamura aiding Enma while Hozuki took his place at the human's court to check on the mortal world. Hozuki feeds Enma (who prefers steak and beer) a vegetarian dinner of konjac, quoting from human myths about him. Hozuki takes Karauri and Nasubi to see Enma's room, which is full of King Enma souvenir statues. The Jizo, a messiah who guides children's souls, is mentioned. Takamura later visits, bringing a giant Jizo statue made of konjac as a gift for Enma, having been told by Hozuki Enma likes konjac.
6	19	"Princess Sakuya's Showtime"; Transliteration: "Purinsesu Sakuya no Shōtaimu" (プリンセスサクヤのショータイム)	November 12, 2017
6	19	"The Battle of Children's Limbo"; Transliteration: "Sai no Kawara no Kōbō" (賽の河原の攻防)	November 12, 2017
As a child, Hozuki snuck into the mortal world with his friends Yomogi and Uzu to see Princess Sakuya. They butter up a Divine Beast to take them to "see a hot babe" - Hakutaku. This was the first time he and Hakutaku actually met. Sakuya has become pregnant and her husband Ninigi doubted the children were his. Hozuki helps her perform a "miracle" to prove they are his. It is revealed Yomogi and Uzu are working at Enma's court alongside Hozuki in present day. Jizo heads to Hell to retrieve children who are trapped in limbo there and reincarnates several. Wishing to be reincarnated all at once, the children take one of the demon minions hostage but Hozuki dismisses their demands. Jizo gently corrects them for acting badly and the riot eases, except for the leader Kimura, who repeatedly tries to get revenge on Hozuki.
7	20	"In Those Days You Were Angsty"; Transliteration: "Ano Goro Kimi wa Togatteta" (あの頃君はトガッてた)	November 19, 2017
7	20	"Dr. Bird Head"; Transliteration: "Dr. Torikabuto" (Dr.トリカブト)	November 19, 2017
Age 15, Hozuki. After beating up someone who called him a good for nothing orphan, Hozuki and his friends Yomogi and Uzu ditch a school test to go to an auction of a cursed iron club at the black market. They reach it but are discovered by a giant demon as they go to leave - the brother of the demon Hozuki beat up earlier. After being called a worthless orphan who got himself sacrificed (again), Hozuki takes the iron club and beats them both up. He leaves with the club - the one he still carries today. The Engineering Department is making a ruckus and Hozuki explains to the Zashiki Warashi they make the torture devices used in Hell. It turns out to be Uzu, who is working with Yomogi to see if they could make a mechanical minion - geisha actually. The friends are arguing over how big the breasts should be, much to Hozuki's annoyance.
8	21	"Hopping Vampire"; Transliteration: "Kyōshi" (Japanese: 僵尸)	November 26, 2017
Yomogi is reading the manga of Chinese Angels, a manga and anime in the Hozuki universe. The Angels receive orders to hunt down Hopping Vampires (Kyonshi) from their commander, Taoist Taiotsu. According to Hozuki, the author based Angel Shuiro on Chun, a kyonshi woman who works as the Chief of Staff for the tenth King, Godotenrin, the taoist who made her. Hozuki arrives in the tenth kingdom in time to see Chun take down a runaway spirit (and accidentally kick him through a wall). Godotenrin admits only one man has dated her given her violent tendencies - Hakutaku. (She received a cameo in season one episode three when she threw Hakutaku out of his shop). When Hakutaku visits the tenth kingdom, Chun beats him up and uses his own technique to bring drawings to life to attack him with a giant centipede.
9	22	"The Offices of Boring"; Transliteration: "Jimi-chō" (地味庁)	December 3, 2017
9	22	"Snow Demons"; Transliteration: "Hachikan Jigoku" (八寒地獄)	December 3, 2017
Koban learns from Gon that Third King Sotai (who looks like Santa) and his chief of staff Misohagi (who looks like he's wearing reindeer horns) used a cat and snake to measure the deceased sin's. Interested, he decides to interview them as there weren't many stories about them. Hozuki tours the Eight Colder Hells, who have also had a great degree of independence from the Ten Kings due to it being too cold for demons of the Eight Hotter Hells to work there. The leaders of the Eight Colder Hells are secretly plotting to declare independence from Enma.
10	23	"Kagachi's Coolheadedness"; Transliteration: "Hozuki Kagachi no Reitetsu" (鬼灯加々知の冷徹)	December 10, 2017
10	23	"Married to His Work"; Transliteration: "Hissatsu Shigoto Oni" (必殺仕事鬼)	December 10, 2017
Maki-Miki are in the Mortal World in the business sector and meet Hozuki, who has taken a drug to look human. Since many deceased work in an office he makes sure to occasionally experience it himself. He takes them to the office he was working in and they see a ghost who carriers her head under her arm. The human CEO claims he could see her and said he was being harassed by her. It turns out this building had an abnormal number of ghosts and Hozuki discerns this was due to the CEO working his employees to death. Still recovering from his time in the Mortal World, Hozuki explains to Nasubi and Karauri the Gods were recently at their Izumo, an annual meeting. During the latest Izumo (which took place during the last episode), Enma admits he conned the other Gods into setting up Hozuki and Maki with a matchmaking charm.
11	24	"Family"; Transliteration: "Kazoku" (家族)	December 17, 2017
11	24	"The Hounds of Hell"; Transliteration: "Jigoku no Inu" (地獄の犬)	December 17, 2017
Since Hozuki has no concept of what's it like to be in a family or have a home, Karauri and Nasubi take him to visit their families. Shiro goes out to have drinks with some of the other Hell dog minions where they try to figure out what breed he is.
12	25	"King Gokan's Chief of Staff"; Transliteration: "Gokan Ō no Dai Ichi Hosa-kan" (五官王の第一補佐官)	December 24, 2017
12	25	"Hell's Hot Springs"; Transliteration: "Jigoku Onsen" (地獄温泉)	December 24, 2017
Anubis, the god of judgement from Egyptian Duat and King Osiris's Chief of Staff is visiting Japanese Hell. While there, he accompanies Hozuki to the office of Fourth King Gokan and her chief of staff Shikimi. There, Gokan uses the Scales of Karma to judge the weight of a person's sin. Shiro wishes to try the Hell Hot Springs so Hozuki attempts to throw him into a cauldron of boiling water. After he tells them he can use the bath. Nasubi and Karauri sneak Shiro, Kakisuke, and Rurio into Fifth King Enma's Hot Spring bath.
13	26	"Mistress of Hell"; Transliteration: "Jigoku Tayū" (地獄太夫)	December 31, 2017
13	26	"Have a Drink and Get Some Rest"; Transliteration: "Sakamoritte Yasume" (酒盛って休め)	December 31, 2017
Oko's boss, Jigoku Dayu, the chief administrator of Mortal Hell, is introduced. She is the student of a monk named Ikkyu, who is disheartened when he sees her decked out in heavy finery at Enma's palace. She states her head is heavy from all the hair ornaments, but there are rules of etiquette to follow. Enma convinces Hozuki to host a year-end employee party. At the party, many of the Japanese-based characters gather and discuss Japanese holidays and possible future parties. Everyone ends up drunk. Hakutaku and the other Good Luck beasts gather for a banquet. Other various parties happen, showing every single character previously introduced.
14	27	"The Day-to-Day at the Offices of Enma"; Transliteration: "Enma-chō no Hibi" (閻魔庁の日々)	April 8, 2018
14	27	"1 Soup, 3 Dishes, 10 Meats"; Transliteration: "Ichi Jū San Na Jū Niku" (一汁三菜十肉)	April 8, 2018
Badly understaffed due to the number of deceased, Hozuki holds employee examinations for new Hell Minions to start off the new year. A giant demon cat named Kasha who ate corpses is introduced among Hell's staff. Hozuki discusses the number of fraudulent scams and calls increasing in the mortal world, with even Nasubi's mom in Hell being targeted. Shiro sees an advertising saying if you can eat a very large serving of food in twenty minutes it is free. Seeing one of the courses is a giant stack of cooked meat, he wants to participate. Since another course is red bean and red bean soup, the Zashiki Warashi agree to help him eat the feast. Hozuki also goes to eat the mystery "Hell Dish" course of the meal.
15	28	"What is a Magical Girl?"; Transliteration: "Majo-kko to wa Nanzoya" (魔女っ子とはなんぞや)	April 15, 2018
15	28	"Indulging in Western Clothing"; Transliteration: "Yōsō Dōraku" (洋装道楽)	April 15, 2018
Peach Maki is offered the role of yet another clumsy magic girl (like Olive from Chinese Angels) after completing her first movie appearance. She has trouble learning the spells the character is supposed to use, so Hozuki asks Lady Lilith for help. She sends Marin from the Valley of Witches. Marin states she is the friend of the witch who tricked Snow White, and is living in the Candy House previously owned by a friend of hers who was burned to death by Gretel. While watching a Maki-Miki special about children clothing in the mundane world, the Zashiki Warashi decide they want new clothing that doesn't make them look so much like Japanese dolls. Hozuki gets them new clothing, but his troubled fashion sense leads to Lady Lilith being called to Japan to help.
16	29	"Dakini of the Welcoming Committee"; Transliteration: "Omukae-ka no Dakini" (お迎え課の荼吉尼)	April 22, 2018
16	29	"Under the Sod"; Transliteration: "Kusaba no Kage" (草葉の陰)	April 22, 2018
Hozuki talks to Nasubi and Karauri about the Welcoming Committee, a group of demons who extract the soul of a dead human and bring it to the afterlife. They are led by a demon named Dakini who has the ability to sense when someone is about to die and ferried to the dead and back by Kasha. Dakini once roamed the mundane world, finding dead to eat with the nine-tailed fox Daji. This led to a feud with Uka-no-Mitama, a benign goddess associated with the fox and the harvest. Humans began to confuse the two women, causing Mitama's divinity to begin to falter as she was offered human sacrifices. Hoozuki tells Shiro, Kakisuke, and Rurio how he first found his goldfish plants growing wild, though even he doesn't know how they came to be. Curious about the plants in Hell, Hozuki take them to a botanical garden, which has a variety of poisonous and predatory plants used in torture.
17	30	"The Man who Learned from Yokai and the Woman who Makes Use of Yokai"; Transliteration: "Yōkai ni Mananda Otoko to Yōkai o Tsukau On'na" (妖怪に学んだ男と妖怪を使う女)	April 29, 2018
The Crow-Tengu Police Department has become the victim of prank phone calls from someone named Princess Takiyasha asking for Yoshitsune Minamoto. Yoshitsune speaks to Hozuki about it, who says she is the sorceress princess from Kuniyoshi Utagawa's "In the Ruined Palace at Soma" and currently has an abode full of her skeleton soldiers in Mortal Hell. Takiyasha reveals she has a crush on Yoshitsune and has been trying to call him, though embarrassment kept overcoming her. The princess's skeletons demand Yoshitsune take her on a date (or sign a marriage contract), but Yoshitsune's Crow-Tengu ridicule the skeletons for troubling their master. A brawl breaks out between the two forces. The fighting between Yoshitsune's Crow-Tengu and Takiyasha's skeletons pauses as Takiyasha talks to Hozuki and Yoshitsune. Suddenly recognizing Hozuki, Takiyasha remembers when she was a living sorceress about to avenge her father and tried to summon a "Demon God of Hell" to lead her army - Hozuki.
18	31	"Amanojaku"; Transliteration: "Amanojaku" (天邪鬼)	May 6, 2018
18	31	"Go Home, Crane"; Transliteration: "Kaere Tsuru" (帰れ鶴)	May 6, 2018
Hozuki takes Rurio to Inferno Hell to meet Princess Uriko, a Hell Minion born from a melon. While there, the group also meets Amanojaku, a malicious former goddess who delighted in causing harm and strife so much so she became a yokai. Hozuki has convinced her to work for him in Hell; her personality has become more cheerful but very irritating and grating. Hozuki rescues a crane who got her head struck in a tree and the crane tries to repay the favor by becoming his wife.
19	32	"Slippery as a Catfish"; Transliteration: "Hyōtan Namazu" (瓢箪鯰)	May 13, 2018
19	32	"Gon Gets to Work"; Transliteration: "Gon Hataraku" (檎 働く)	May 13, 2018
The legendary supreme yokai commander Nurarihyon visits, but he is revealed to be a short and timid demon without much presence at all. Even he is unsure why his reputation was elevated the way it was. He wishes he could be more like the legend about him. Hozuki, Gon, and Koban try to help him change his image. Gon's laziness catches up to him as Daji berates him for low sales. He attempts to get back into her good graces by getting a snake (her favorite food) for her to eat from Hozuki.
20	33	"Games"; Transliteration: "Gēmu" (ゲーム)	May 20, 2018
20	33	"Mechanical Chief of Staff"; Transliteration: "Karakuri Hosa-kan" (絡繰補佐官)	May 20, 2018
Shiro, Rurio, and Kakisuke go to Hell's video arcade. Among other things, they find Rurio is a master of shooting games, Satan is visiting and playing a dating sim, and Hozuki is too good at Whack-A-Mole. Hozuki takes Lilith and Beelzebub on a visit to 6th King Henjo's mechanical/industrialized court. While there, they meet a robot that is being programmed to become his new chief-of staff - a cursed doll Lilith gave him.
21	34	"The Rabbit Called Mustard"; Transliteration: "Keshi to Iu Usagi" (芥子という兎)	May 27, 2018
21	34	"Types"; Transliteration: "Hanchū" (範疇)	May 27, 2018
Mustard walks the viewers through a normal day for her. Her rabbit friends talk her into attending a singles party, though Mustard brings Hozuki as she doesn't know any other rabbits. Among the guests in the divine messenger, the Hare of Inaba. Mustard and Hozuki see Hakutaku talking with Cow-Head and wonder how wide a range of romantic partners he is okay with. Hakutaku tells them it is not a date as Gozu was just asking him for advice for a gift - her friend is about to get married. Hakutaku does tell them he's alright with any human-looking woman so Hozuki calls Amanojaku.
22	35	"Yakan Siblings"; Transliteration: "Yakan Kyōdai" (野干兄妹)	June 3, 2018
22	35	"Shiro's Butt is in a Real Jam"; Transliteration: "Shiro no Shiri ga Dai Pinchi" (シロの尻が大ピンチ)	June 3, 2018
Miki visits her three older brothers in Mortal Hell who work at Gon's fox cafe: Ojiya, Tortilla, and Hoya. While there, they find Hozuki practicing with a nikeichu puppet. He was asked to speak at a Hell Minion preschool and thought a puppet might help. Miki gets talked into helping him. At the Realm of Devouring Fiery Bugs, Shiro gets infected with a nikeichu.
23	36	"Fundamentally"; Transliteration: "Konpon Teki ni" (こんぽんてきに)	June 10, 2018
23	36	"Mixed Martial Arts Contest"; Transliteration: "Ishu Kakutōgisen" (異種格闘技戦)	June 10, 2018
Mustard tries to get over her grudge against tanuki. Hozuki would rather she not because of how well she channels the hatred into her work as a Hell Minion, but relents and takes her to a temple run by a tanuki. Mustard wonders how strong she is, given she's a rabbit and many Hell minion animals are carnivores. To find out, Hozuki plans an animal fighting tournament, pitting her against animal minions.
24	37	"The Stripping Hag and Clothes Hanging Geezer"; Transliteration: "Datsueba to Ken'eō" (奪衣婆と懸衣翁)	June 17, 2018
24	37	"Chef Miki"; Transliteration: "Oryōri Miki-chan" (お料理ミキちゃん)	June 17, 2018
The Clothes Hanging Geezer, the Stripping Hag's lazy husband (who's in love with Maki and cuts work to attend her concerts), threatens to quit unless Hozuki gets him Maki's autograph. Miki tries to learn how to cook for an upcoming show so she doesn't embarrass herself and asks Maki for help. Her manager is alright if she makes a fool of herself since it will boost ratings and make her persona more clumsy and lovable.
25	38	"Onki"; Transliteration: "Onki" (瘟鬼)	June 24, 2018
25	38	"Animals Don't Forget One's Kindness"; Transliteration: "Dōbutsu wa On o Wasurenai" (動物は恩を忘れない)	June 24, 2018
Yoshitsune Minamoto tells Hozuki he believes the Ogres of Ogre Island Momotaro defeated in his life are active again, so Hozuki recruits Momotaro to investigate. Hozuki takes Shiro, Kakisuke and Rurio to 2nd King Shoko's offices. A large animal lover with an intelligent panda as his chief-of-staff, Shoko wished to meet the animals. He calls the pets of the deceased as material witnesses, as people often show their true personality when they interact with animals.
26	39	"Unrivaled at Poker"; Transliteration: "Pōkā nara Muteki" (ポーカーなら無敵)	July 1, 2018
26	39	"Is Hell Your Intended Destination?"; Transliteration: "Yuki-saki wa Jigoku no Katade Yoroshikatta Deshou ka" (逝き先は地獄の方で宜しかったでしょうか)	July 1, 2018
Nasubi and Karauri try to get the Zashiki Warashi to smile and act more like normal girls but fails. When a troublesome deceased who jokes about everything comes to Enma's office, Hozuki asks him to make the girls laugh. Hageito, the head of the Records Department, and Uzu, Hozuki's childhood friend, get into an argument over Uzu's poor handwriting and improper/casual use of potential verb forms. Uzu says it doesn't matter as long as the general idea is gotten across, but Hageito insists proper Japanese must be used and details are everything. Hozuki holds a majority vote, asking practically every character introduced for their opinion. Who is right? - Uzu or Hageito. The closing post-credit scene is Hozuki addressing the audience. "So, what did you think of daily life in Hell? Should you find yourself here one day, in accordance with your crimes, you can rest assured I will give you the treatment you deserve."

== OADs ==
In June 2014, a series of three original anime DVDs (OADs) was announced to be produced by the same staff of the anime series. The OADs were screened in eleven selected theaters in Japan from December 6 to December 28, 2014. They were released along with the 17th, 18th, and 19th manga volumes on February 23, May 22, and August 21, 2015, respectively. A fourth OAD was released through the 24th volume on March 21, 2017. Three more OADs were produced by the same staff of the second season, with production by Pine Jam. The first two were released along with the 29th and 30th manga volumes on September 20, 2019, and March 23, 2020; and the third was released along with the 31st volume on September 23, 2020.

No.	Japanese title	Original release
1	"The Temperature Difference Between Enthusiasts and Non-Enthusiasts"; Transliteration: "Mania to Hi Mania no Ondo-sa" (マニアと非マニアの温度差)	February 23, 2015
1	"Knock Knock, Wild Crab, Large & Small Coins"; Transliteration: "Konkon Yakan Ōban Koban" (コンコン野干 大判小判)	February 23, 2015
2	"How to Defeat a Zashiki-Warashi"; Transliteration: "Zashikiwarashi Kōryaku-hō" (座敷童子攻略法)	May 22, 2015
2	"Idol Frontline"; Transliteration: "Aidoru Zensen" (アイドル前線)	May 22, 2015
3	"Is Art an Explosion!"; Transliteration: "Geijutsu wa Bakuhatsu ka?" (芸術は爆発か?)	August 21, 2015
3	"Art Was an Explosion"; Transliteration: "Geijutsu wa Bakuhatsu Deshita" (芸術は爆発でした)	August 21, 2015
4	"Flowering Front"; Transliteration: "Hanasaki Zensen" (花咲前線)	March 21, 2017
4	"Three Different Men"; Transliteration: "Sanshasan'yō no Otoko" (三者三様の男)	March 21, 2017
5	"Enma-Cho & Ryugu-Cho"; Transliteration: "Enma Chō to Ryūgū Jō" (閻魔帳と竜宮城)	September 20, 2019
5	"It's Hard if You Don't Have a Specialty"; Transliteration: "Ohako ga nai to Tsurai Are" (十八番がないと辛いアレ)	September 20, 2019
6	"It's Hairy and Covered in Cat Ash"; Transliteration: "Kekkō Ke-darake Neko Hai-darake" (けっこう毛だらけ猫灰だらけ)	March 23, 2020
6	"Consider it Well"; Transliteration: "Yoki ni Hakarae" (よきにはからえ)	March 23, 2020
7	"In Short, Poison"; Transliteration: "Yōha Doku" (要は毒)	September 23, 2020
7	"A Lecture on Cursed Things by Monsters Born from Curses"; Transliteration: "Noroi Kara Umareta Kaibutsu-tachi ni Yoru Noroi Mono Kōza" (呪いから生まれた怪物たちによる呪いモノ講座)	September 23, 2020

== Home media ==
=== Japanese ===
King Records released the complete Hozuki's Coolheadedness's first season in Japan on six Blu-ray and DVD volumes between April 9 and August 13, 2014. Each one of the six compilations has an "A" and "B" version that includes different covers and package. King Records settled to release the second season on four Blu-Ray and DVD boxes between January 17 and September 19, 2018.

King Records (Japan, Region 2 DVD)
Volume	Episodes	Release date	Ref.
Volume 1	1–2	April 9, 2014	
Volume 2	3–4	April 9, 2014	
Volume 3	5–6	May 14, 2014	
Volume 4	7–8	June 11, 2014	
Volume 5	9–10	July 9, 2014	
Volume 6	11–13	August 13, 2014	

King Records (Japan, Region 2 DVD)
Volume	Episodes	Release date	Ref.
Box 1	1–6	January 17, 2018	
Box 2	7–13	March 14, 2018	
Box 3	14–19	July 18, 2018	
Box 4	20–26	September 19, 2018	

=== English ===
For Region 1, Sentai Filmworks has licensed the series and released the complete series with English subtitles in a single box on DVD and Blu-ray on February 17, 2015. Sentai Filmworks has licensed the second season for Region 1. Madman Entertainment released a DVD box of season one on October 21, 2015, in Australia and New Zealand.

Sentai Filmworks (North America, Region 1 DVD)
Volume	Episodes	Release date	Ref.
Box	1–13	February 17, 2015	

Madman Entertainment (Australia and New Zealand, Region 4 DVD)
Volume	Episodes	Release date	Ref.
Box	1–13	October 21, 2015	
