= Human Lost =

2019 Japanese animated film

- Theatrical release poster
- Directed by: Fuminori Kizaki; Hiroshi Ootake (Note: Animation Director (アニメーションディレクター))
- Screenplay by: Tow Ubukata
- Based on: No Longer Human by Osamu Dazai
- Produced by: Toshiaki Obata; Kento Yoshida
- Starring: Mamoru Miyano; Kana Hanazawa; Takahiro Sakurai; Jun Fukuyama; Miyuki Sawashiro; Haruka Chisuga
- Cinematography: Akira Hirabayashi
- Music by: Yugo Kanno
- Production company: Polygon Pictures
- Distributed by: TOHO Visual Entertainment
- Release dates: June 14, 2019 (Annecy); November 29, 2019 (Japan)
- Running time: 110 minutes
- Country: Japan
- Language: Japanese

Human Lost (Japanese: HUMAN LOST 人間失格, Hepburn: Hyūman Rosuto: Ningen Shikkaku) is a 2019 Japanese 3D animated science fiction film directed by Fuminori Kizaki and Hiroshi Ootake, and produced by Polygon Pictures. It premiered in Japan in November 2019, and is loosely based on Osamu Dazai's 1948 novel No Longer Human.

== Plot ==
In the year 2036, breakthroughs in medical technology have led to a system of nanomachines internally implanted in all humans that can reverse illness, injury and even death. But if a person severs their nanomachines from the system, they mutate into monstrous creatures known as "Lost". Yozo, Masao and Yoshiko are now "applicants" with special powers over the Lost.

== Cast ==
Character	Japanese	English
Yozo Oba (大庭 葉蔵, Ōba Yōzō)	Mamoru Miyano	Austin Tindle
Tsuneko (恒子)	Haruka Chisuga	Sarah Wiedenheft
Takeichi (竹一)	Jun Fukuyama	Jason Liebrecht
Yoshiko Hiiragi (柊 美子, Hiiragi Yoshiko)	Kana Hanazawa	Macy Anne Johnson
Shibuta (渋田)	Kenichirou Matsuda	Chris Rager
Madam (マダム, Madamu)	Miyuki Sawashiro	Stephanie Young
Atsugi (厚木)	Rikiya Koyama	David Wald
Masao Horiki (堀木 正雄, Horiki Masao)	Takahiro Sakurai	Robert McCollum
Shige (茂)	Shigeru Chiba	R. Bruce Elliott
Shizuko	Seiko Tamura	Katelyn Barr

== Production ==
Katsuyuki Motohiro is serving as supervisor. Fuminori Kizaki will direct the film at Polygon Pictures. Tow Ubukata is writing the scripts. Yūsuke Kozaki is designing the characters, and Kenichiro Tomiyasu is in charge of concept art.

=== Casting ===
The cast of film was revealed via teaser on YouTube. The film stars Mamoru Miyano, Kana Hanazawa, Takahiro Sakurai, Jun Fukuyama, and Miyuki Sawashiro.

== Release ==
The film premiered at the 2019 Annecy International Animation Film Festival. It was released by Funimation on October 22, 2019, in North American theaters and on November 29, 2019, in Japan.

=== Media ===
In Japan, the film was released on Blu-ray and DVD on May 20, 2020.

In the United States, the film was released on Blu-ray and DVD on August 25, 2020, with an English dub.

=== Manga ===
A manga adaptation of the film, illustrated by Ryūsuke Takashiro, was announced on the July issue of Kodansha's seinen manga magazine Monthly Afternoon in May 2019. It was serialized in the magazine from June 25 to October 25 of that same year. Its five chapters were compiled in a single tankōbon volume, released on November 22, 2019.

== Reception ==
The film won the Axis: The Satoshi Kon Award for Excellence in Animation award as a Special Mention at the 2019 Montreal's Fantasia International Film Festival.
