= Kachi-kachi Yama =

Japanese Folktale

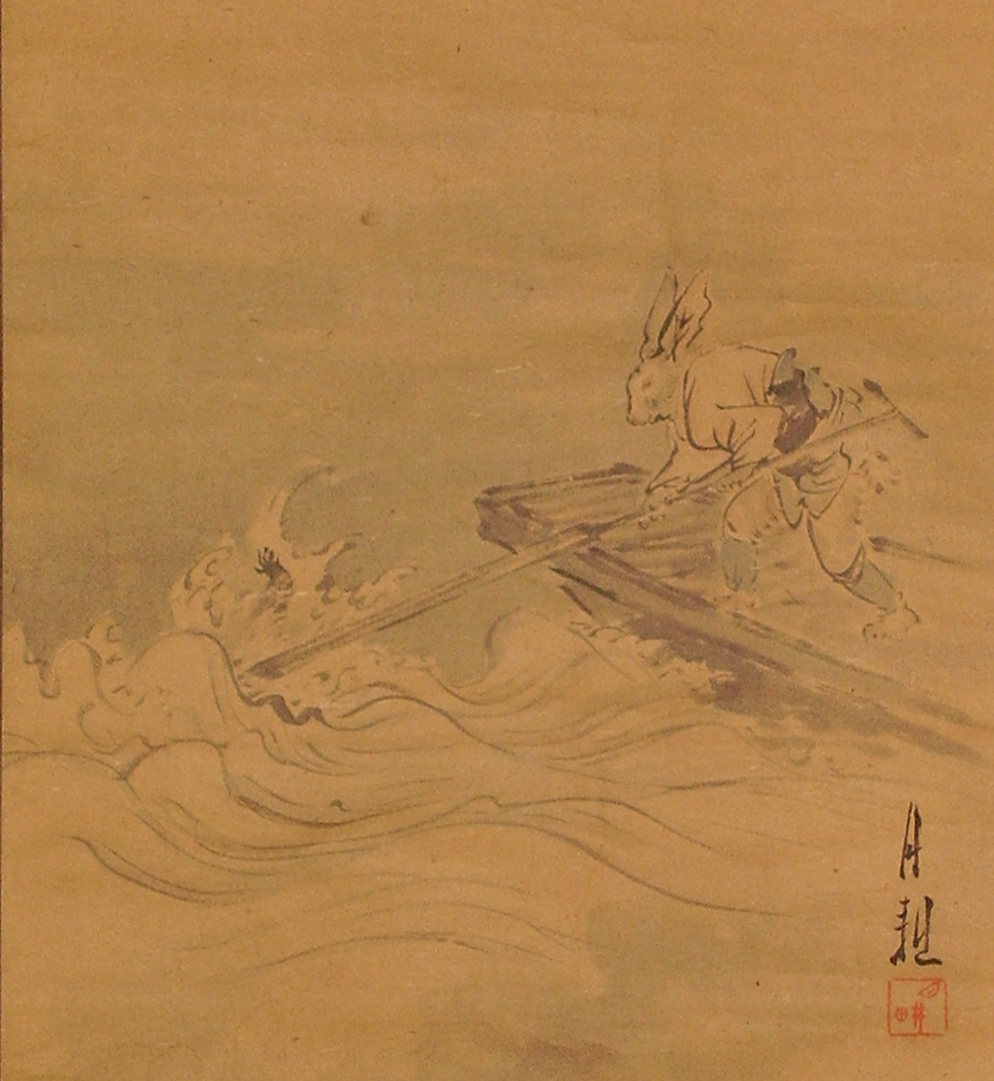
The climactic scene of Kachi-kachi Yama, in which the rabbit strikes the already-sinking tanuki with an oar, and reveals his vendetta. Detail from a Japanese painting circa 1890s-1900s.

Kachi-kachi Yama (かちかち山; kachi-kachi being an onomatopoeia of the sound a fire makes and yama meaning "mountain", roughly translates to "Fire-Crackle Mountain"), also known as Kachi-Kachi Mountain and The Farmer and the Badger, is a Japanese folktale in which a tanuki is the villain, rather than the more usual boisterous, well-endowed alcoholic.

== Story ==
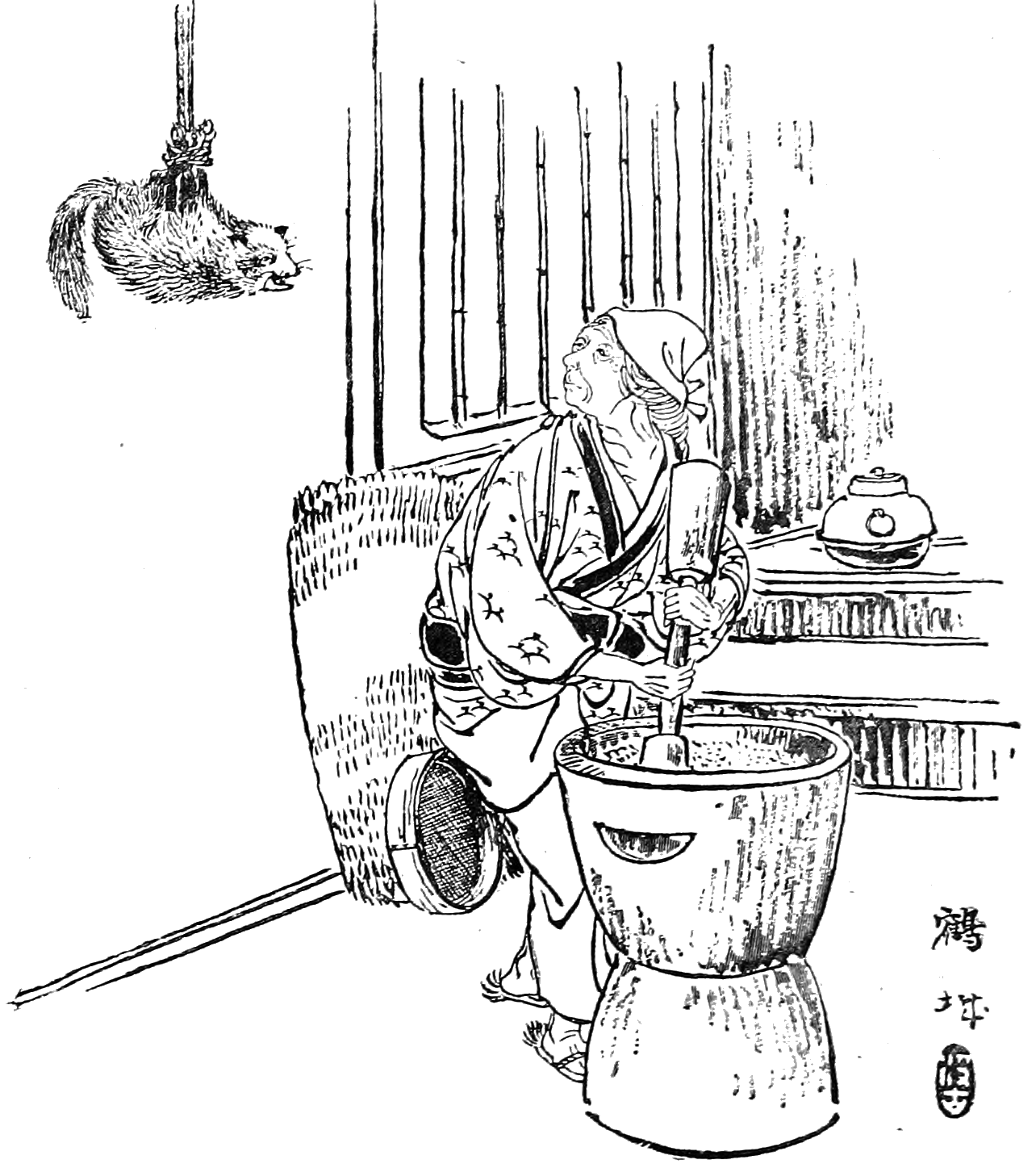
The tied-up tanuki enticing the woman to set him free, from The Japanese Fairy Book

=== The trouble-making tanuki ===
As the story goes, a man caught a troublesome tanuki in his fields, and tied it to a tree to kill and cook it later. When the man left for town, the tanuki cried and begged the man's wife who was making some mochi, a sweet rice dish, to set him free, promising he would help her. The wife freed the animal, only to have it turn on her and kill her. The tanuki then planned a foul trick.

Using its shapeshifting abilities, the tanuki disguised itself as the wife and cooked a soup, using the dead woman's flesh. When the man came home, the tanuki served him the soup. After the meal, the tanuki reverted to its original appearance and revealed its treachery before running off and leaving the poor man in shock and grief. Before the tanuki left, he laughed the man to scorn and said, “You wife-eating old man you! Did not you see the bones under the floor?”. Though the man chased after the tanuki, the tanuki got away.

=== The rabbit does join in ===
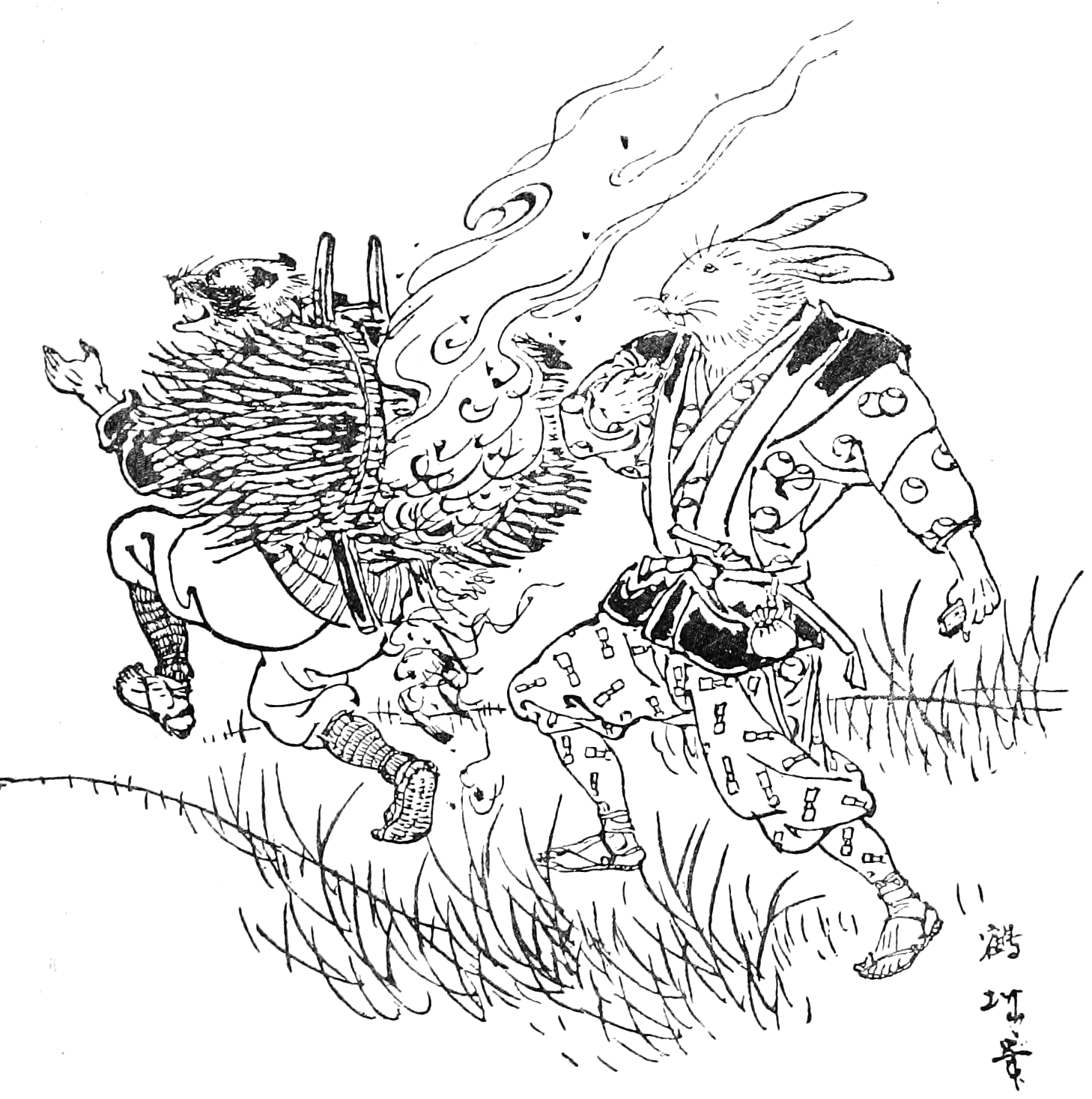
The bundle is set on fire

The couple had been good friends with a rabbit that lived nearby. The rabbit approached the man and told him that it would avenge his wife's death. Pretending to befriend the tanuki, the rabbit instead tortured it through various means, from dropping a bee's nest on it to 'treating' the stings with a peppery poultice that burned.

The title of the story comes from the especially painful trick that the rabbit played. While the tanuki was carrying a heavy load of kindling on his back to make a campfire for the night, he was so burdened that he did not immediately notice when the rabbit set fire to the kindling. Soon, the crackling sound reached its ears and it asked the rabbit what the sound was. "It is Kachi-Kachi Yama" the rabbit replied. "We are not far from it, so it is no surprise that you can hear it!". Eventually, the fire reached the tanuki's back, burning it badly, but without killing it.

=== The mud boat ===
The tanuki challenged the rabbit to a life or death contest to prove who was the better creature. They were each to build a boat and race across a lake in them. The rabbit carved its boat out of a fallen tree trunk, but the foolish tanuki made a boat of mud. In other versions the rabbit built both boats.

The two competitors were evenly matched at first, but the tanuki's mud boat began dissolving in the middle of the lake. As the tanuki was failing in its struggle to stay afloat, the rabbit proclaimed its friendship with the human couple, and that this was the tanuki's punishment for its horrible deeds. In other versions the rabbit strikes the tanuki with his oar to ensure he sinks.

The rabbit then goes back to the old man's home and tell him about the vengeance, much to the relief of the old man. He thanks the rabbit for his deed.

=== Variations ===
There are other versions that alter some details of the story, such as the severity of what the tanuki did to the woman and how the tanuki got the mud boat.

== Modern-day references ==
Mt. Kachi Kachi and its Tenjō-Yama Park Mt. Kachi Kachi Ropeway refer to this story and have statues depicting portions of the story.

Shikoku Tanuki Train Line railway station in Japan uses the slogan "Our trains aren't made of mud", a direct reference to the "Kachi-Kachi Yama" tale.

In the anime Kuroko no Basuke (S3E7), when Ryota Kise exclaims in excitement about his first game as a starter for Teiko, Atsushi Murasakibara says that he will hold them back and sink them like a mud boat, with Shintaro Midorima then directly referencing Kachi-kachi Yama

The video game Keio Flying Squadron's story was inspired by the folktale, only with a bunny girl, Rami Nanahikari, riding on her dragon Spot to retrieve her ancient family's stolen key from the super intelligent tanuki, Dr. Pon Eho. Game designer Satoru Honda created and chose Rami as the main protagonist because he believed that just because a rabbit was the main character did not mean that it had to be an actual rabbit, and thought about bunny girls when thinking about them. The manual for the game's sequel, Keio Flying Squadron 2, even has firewood and boats made of mud listed in Dr. Pon's profile as his dislikes, in reference to the story.

In the video game Super Mario Sunshine, in the level "Noki Bay", Mario meets a "Tanooki" who gives free rides on mud boats, a clear reference to the boat that the tanuki in this tale used. While these boats can stay afloat, they will dissolve if they stay still for too long or if they bump into something.

Another reference in a Nintendo product can be found in the internal name for their in-house, custom NES emulator (named Kachikachi) that comes pre-installed on the NES Classic Edition.

In the anime Hoozuki no Reitetsu, the rabbit is one of the best torturers in Hell, who goes into a blind rage when someone says the word tanuki/raccoon.

In the anime Heya Camp, the main characters visit Mt. Kachi Kachi and relate the tale while riding the ropeway. They incorrectly recall the details, however, mixing in portions of the fable The Tortoise and the Hare as well as leaving out the grim tone of the original, including the statement of, "They all lived happily ever after." All this serves to confuse the other sightseers in the cable car with them.

In the anime BNA, characters on an opposing sports team taunt the main character Michiru (a tanuki Beastman) by saying she should be building a mud boat instead of playing baseball.

In the mobile video game The Battle Cats, there is a unit in the game called Kachi-Kachi. The unit is a modernized version of the wood-carrying part of the story. The raccoon is carrying wood, and a cat has a flamethrower, which is shooting at the raccoon. The raccoon ducks and the fire blows to the enemy. At level 10, it evolves into Fire Squad Kachiyama. This unit is a raccoon who is controlling the hose of a fire truck, with many cats driving it, however, unlike real fire trucks, this fire truck shoots actual fire balls. At level 30 using catfruit it evolves into Kachiyama Assault Brigade and the fire truck gains color, as well as gaining more speed and changing its ability.

In the Ace Attorney stage play "Turnabout Gold Medal", there is a scene where protagonist Phoenix Wright and opposing prosecutor Franziska Von Karma argue in virtual reality over elements of the story as the rabbit and the tanuki, respectively.

In the anime Urusei Yatsura, a child proclaims "It's Kachi-Kachi Yama!" upon seeing main character Ataru running while his clothes were set on fire by supporting character Ten.

In the manga False Child the shape-shifting tanuki protagonist picks out this book from the library before being dissuaded from choosing it by her surrogate mother figure.

A passing reference to this story occurs in the animated film Pom Poko (1994, Studio Ghibli).

The musician TroubleMent, in her song Run Rabbit Run, references the story by opening the song with "Kachi Kachi". The song, rather than portraying the rabbit as a hero, instead portrays it as a hunted prey of a dark spirit out for revenge, likely that of the tanuki.

== Background ==
Kachi-Kachi Yama is a Satoyama(里山,さとやま, Japanese term applied to the border zone or area between mountain foothills and arable flat land.) The daily life of people in old times close to nature made many Japanese folktales. Also, we can understand their lifestyle and the feeling of nature from Japanese folktales.

== Osamu Dazai version ==
Osamu Dazai rewrote Kachi-Kachi Yama with his original interpretation in Otogi-zōshi (お伽草紙, a Japanese collection of short stories), a fatal story where the rabbit is a beautiful teenage girl who is ingenuous and cruel, and the tanuki is a stupid man who is in love and stays compliant with her.

== See also ==
- Bunbuku Chagama, another Japanese folktale on the tanuki
