= The Final Years =

Japanese short story collection

- "The Final Years" 1st Edition (Japanese)
- Author: Osamu Dazai
- Original title: 晩年
- Language: Japanese
- Genre: Short Story Collection
- Publisher: Sunagoya shobō
- Publication date: 1936
- Publication place: Japan
- Media type: Print (paperback)

The Final Years (Japanese: 晩年, Hepburn: Bannen) is a Japanese short story collection written by Osamu Dazai and was published in 1936. It was Dazai's first published book, composed of fifteen previously published short stories, and was completed ten years after Dazai first decided to become a writer.

== Background ==
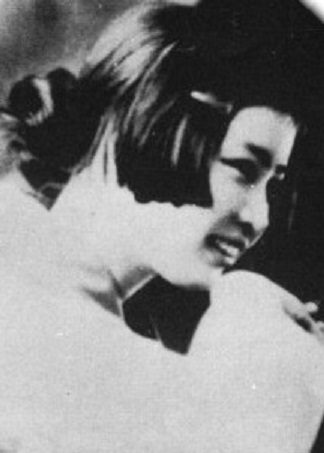
Shimeko Tanabe

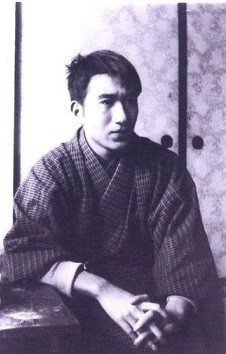
Osamu Dazai in 1928, a few years before writing The Final Years

In 1930, while enrolled at the University of Tokyo, Dazai was visited by Koyama Hatsuyo, a geisha whom he had known since he was in high school in Aomori. Hatsuyo had broken her contract and fled from Aomori to Tokyo. In an attempt to avoid a potential scandal, Dazai’s eldest brother, Bunji, soon arrived and made Dazai send Hatsuyo away. Before agreeing, however, Dazai made Bunji promise that he would be allowed to eventually marry Hatsuyo. Bunji agreed and returned to Aomori, taking Hatsuyo with him.

Shortly thereafter, feeling isolated from Hatsuyo and disapproval from his family, Dazai attempted double suicide with Shimeko Tanabe, a waitress. Dazai survived, but Shimeko did not. The following month, Dazai was allowed to marry Hatsuyo.

Over the next two years (1931-1932), Dazai wrote very little. Twice, he was questioned by the police about his involvement with the left-wing movement in Japan, but both times he was released almost immediately. After the second incident, he cut ties with the left-wing movement. At that same time, Dazai, who had always thought of Hatsuyo as pure and innocent, came to know of her sexual history as a geisha. It also became clear that Dazai, who hadn’t attended school since shortly after his older brother, Keiji’s, death in 1930, would not be able to graduate. Once again, Dazai was contemplating suicide.

This time, however, Dazai was determined to leave something behind. He began by writing Recollections, an extremely autobiographical story originally imagined as a type of suicide note. From 1932-1934, Dazai wrote twenty additional stories. Many of Dazai’s early stories were written with his own life experiences and outlooks in mind. He then chose the best fourteen of those stories and burned the other seven. These fourteen stories, as well as The Flowers of Buffoonery, were published in various literary magazines from 1933 to 1936 before being published together as The Final Years.

Dazai gave the collection the title The Final Years, thinking that it really would be both his first and last book, published after his death. Dazai did indeed attempt suicide again after submitting The Final Years for publication, but not until March 1937. He survived this attempt as well.

The Final Years, as well as some of Dazai’s stories that came after, were published in and around the events leading up to and in World War II. This was during a time the Japanese government was strict on what could be published and what could not. Many critics agree that Dazai’s stories are among the best literary artworks that were published during that time.

== Summary ==
Below is a list of the stories that appear in The Final Years, in the same order as they are found in the book, along with summaries for the stories that are available in English.

=== Leaves ===
Leaves (Japanese: 葉, Hepburn: Ha) has no definite plot. It is composed of many different literary pieces that appear to be thrown together randomly. Together they help the reader form an idea of the character’s experiences as well as their (the character’s) outlook on life. Readers are never told the character’s name but at one point, the narrator mentions that their grandmother would sometimes jokingly call her grandchild “Kichizo”. There are many seemingly random flashes of memories from the character’s life in that are described in great detail. These are commonly known as vignettes and they give us insight as to what the character’s life might have been like. Short verses of poetry as well as brief thoughts or statements that reflect the character’s outlook on life (also known as pensées) are also thrown into the mix.

=== Recollections ===
Recollections (Japanese: 思ひ出, Hepburn: Omoide) (or Memories as it is sometimes translated) is a collection of the character’s memories from when he was growing up. Readers are not given a name, however, there are enough clues in the text to hint that the character is male. The memories are portrayed in a fairly chronological pattern starting from when the main character was born, although a few memories are told out of chronological order. Many memories focus on the character’s relationship with his family. Some family members are easy to get along with, but most appear to look down on him. Some memories tell about the character’s struggles with school, his health, and growing up as well as his ever changing and challenging circumstances. Other memories are about happy events the character remembers fondly from his childhood.

=== Undine ===
Undine (Japanese: 魚服記, Hepburn: Gyofukuki), alternatively translated as Metamorphosis, is a short story about a girl named Suwa who lives alone with her father. Her father gathers charcoal to support him and his daughter. Suwa runs a tea stand by a nearby waterfall during the summer and gathers mushrooms in the winter to help them get by. Their relationship is somewhat strained and they rarely talk to each other. One evening after an unfortunate encounter with her drunken father, Suwa runs away into a snowstorm. She heads towards the waterfall and throws herself into its depths. When she opens her eyes again, she finds she has transformed into a carp. She is joyful in her fortune to be free of her father. However, this joy quickly fades. The last image the readers have of the carp is to see it swim into the base of the waterfall and get pulled further under.

=== Train ===
Train (Japanese: 列車, Hepburn: Ressha) is the fourth story in The Final Years.

=== Chikyūzu ===
Chikyūzu (Japanese: 地球図, Hepburn: Chikyūzu), meaning "World Map", is the fifth story in The Final Years.

=== Monkey Island ===
Monkey Island (Japanese: 猿ヶ島, Hepburn: Sarugashima) is a short story told from the perspective a recently captured Japanese monkey. Readers are not immediately told that the character whose eyes they are seeing through is a monkey, but the author does not leave them in the shadows for too long. The story begins with the main character (no name is given) arriving upon a dark foreign island shrouded in mist after a long voyage. The character explores the perimeter of the island and finds that it is a rather small island as it does not take long to go around it. As the sun rises, the mist starts to dissipate and the character is able to see more of the island. He finds a dead tree near a waterfall and climbs it. After breaking one of the branches and falling down, the character meets a monkey who has been on the island for some time. Through their conversation, readers learn that the monkeys are the same species although they come from different homes in Japan (the second monkey is from northern Japan while the main character is from the middle of Japan). As they reminisce about their homeland, they see some of the other monkeys who inhabit the island. No words are shared between the two groups. The monkeys then see a group of humans walking along a path not far from where they are sitting. The second monkey tells the main character about each of the humans. His explanations are both accurate and a little off as there are some things he does not quite understand about humans. The main character realizes that all of the monkeys are there for the humans’ entertainment and is furious. The second monkey tries to tell the main character that life on the island is not so bad, but he/she (the author never specifies a gender for the main character) is determined to leave. The last thing in the story is a short bulletin from the London Zoo about two Japanese monkeys escaping from Monkey Island in 1896.

=== Suzumeko ===
Suzumeko (Japanese: 雀こ, Hepburn: Suzumeko) is the seventh story in The Final Years.

=== The Flowers of Buffoonery ===
The Flowers of Buffoonery (Japanese: 道化の華, Hepburn: Dōke no hana) is the eighth and longest story in The Final Years (see main article: The Flowers of Buffoonery).

=== Monkey-Faced Youth ===
Monkey-Faced Youth (Japanese: 猿面冠者, Hepburn: Sarumenkanja) is the ninth story in The Final Years.

=== Losing Ground ===
Losing Ground (Japanese: 逆行, Hepburn: Gyakkō), alternatively translated as Regression, is the tenth story in The Final Years.

=== He Is Not the Man He Used to Be ===
He is Not the Man He Used to Be (Japanese: 彼は昔の彼ならず, Hepburn: Kare ha mukashi no kare narazu) is the eleventh story in The Final Years.

=== Romanesque ===
Romanesque (Japanese: ロマネスコ, Hepburn: Romanesuko) is the twelfth story in The Final Years.

=== Toys ===
Toys (Japanese: 玩具, Hepburn: Gangu) is the thirteenth story in The Final Years.

=== Inka ===
Inka (Japanese: 陰火, Hepburn: Inka) is the fourteenth story in The Final Years.

=== Mekura Sōshi ===
Mekura Sōshi (Japanese: めくら草紙, Hepburn: Mekura sōshi) is the fifteenth and final story in The Final Years.

== Analysis/themes ==
The stories contained in The Final Years show a variety of different themes and outlooks on life as well as demonstrate the many different styles of writing Dazai was capable of. This makes Dazai a popular Japanese literary artist for American scholars to study.

The meta-autobiographical style found throughout several of the stories in The Final Years is a literary genre developed in Japan, known as the I-novel. Many of Dazai's later works, such as The Setting Sun were I-novels. Dazai is considered by many literary critics, such as Masao Miyoshi, to be the last great I-novelist.

Many of the other writing forms that Dazai would later become well known for, such as the historical fiction and satire, are also found in The Final Years, in Chikyuuzu and Monkey Island, respectively. Similarly, many of the character archetypes that would appear in many of Dazai's later work, such as the vulnerable or abused woman, the con man, and that of the writer who has grown tired of life.

According to James O'Brien, who translated many of Dazai's literary works into English, Japanese critics often describe Recollections as an autobiography of sorts.

In regards to Monkey Island, O’Brien claims that the story is not referencing a true breakout from the London zoo, but is more of a depiction of Japan breaking free from some unfair treaties with other foreign powers.

Undine is based on the eighteenth-century story "The Carp That Came to My Dream," by Ueda Akinari, in which a priest is transformed into a carp for three days before eventually being caught and killed by a fisherman. The priest then awakes and believes that the three days he lived as a fish were, in fact a dream. Ueda, however, asserts that the priest was indeed dead for those three days, and that the carp was indeed caught, just as described by the priest. In this way, the line between reality and fiction is blurred and uncertain. Undine contains similar themes, as well as some connection to events in Dazai's own life, such as his own suicide attempt by drowning.

== Reception ==
Dazai was nominated for the Akutagawa Prize twice for stories that appear in The Final Years.

Dazai’s story Losing Ground was one of four runner ups for the first Akutagawa Prize, though it was harshly criticized by Yasunari Kawabata, already a prominent author at the time and one of the judges.

Though Dazai is known primarily for his later novels, Recollections is commonly recognized as one of Dazai’s best and most significant short stories.
