= Zenrin-ji (Mitaka) =

Ōbaku Zen temple in Mitaka, Tokyo

- 禅林寺
- The sanmon of the temple

Religion
- Affiliation: Obaku school
- Prefecture: Tokyo Prefecture

Location
- Location: 4-18-20 Shimorenjaku, Mitaka, Tokyo
- Country: Japan
- Interactive map of Zenrin-ji
- Prefecture: Tokyo Prefecture
- Coordinates: 35°41′39.58″N 139°33′35.98″E

Architecture
- Founder: Komada Magoemon
- Completed: 1700 (reconstruction)

Website
- http://www.zenrinji.jp/

The Zenrin-ji (禅林寺) is a temple of the Obaku school of Buddhism located in Mitaka, a city within the Tokyo Metropolis. Its mountain name (山号, sangō) is Reisenzan. It is a branch temple of the Manpuku-ji, the head temple of the Obaku school.

The temple is also notable as the site of the graves of Japanese writers Osamu Dazai and Ōgai Mori. An annual memorial service, the Ōtō-ki, is held on Dazai's birthday (June 19) in his honour; on July 9 every year, a memorial service is held for Mori.

== History ==
The temple has its origins in the Genroku era. After a typhoon destroyed the previously existing temple in Genroku 12 (1699 AD), the land was returned to the village, making reconstruction disallowed. After discussion, the villagers approached Kenshu Genyo in Edo, a master of the Obaku school, to establish a temple at the location. Thus, in the twelfth month of Genroku 13, the temple was re-established as the Reisenzan Zenrin-ji. Komada Magoemon, also from Edo, became the founder of the temple. The temple became a branch of the Manpuku-ji, the head temple of the Obaku school, and remains so presently.

Towards the end of the Taisho era, most of the area surrounding the temple was farmland, and it was therefore inconvenient to commute to and from the temple. In the interest of the residents' and visitors' convenience, the Zenrin-ji collected signatures and seals from volunteers for a petition to establish a station and submitted it to the relevant authorities. However, the neighbouring municipality of Musashino also submitted a similar petition shortly after; after due consideration, the authorities selected Mitaka as the site for a new station and notified this in the third year of the Shōwa era (1929). The temple donated 750 tsubo of its own land to form the grounds for the station, and the Mitaka Station was opened on 25 June, 1930.

== Cultural Properties ==
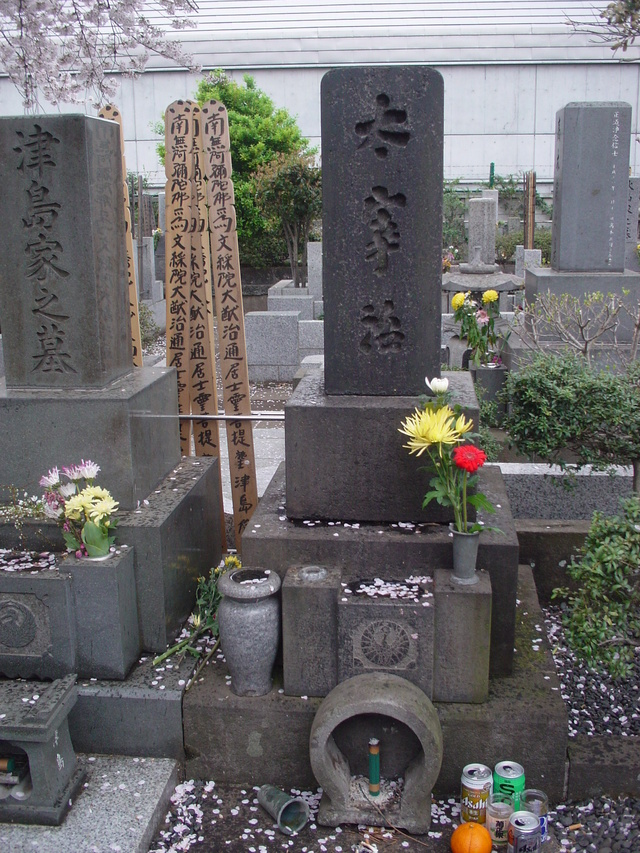
The tomb of Osamu Dazai, located at the Zenrin-ji in Mitaka.

The temple contains the graves of renowned Japanese novelists Osamu Dazai and Ōgai Mori. Mori was initially buried at the Kofuku-ji temple in Tokyo's Sumida ward, but after the temple was damaged by the Great Kantō Earthquake, his remains were reinterred at the Zenrin-ji in December 1927 (Shōwa 2). Dazai had drowned himself in the Tamagawa Aqueduct in 1948, along with his mistress. He had requested to be buried next to Ōgai Mori, as he deeply admired him; his wish was fulfilled and his grave sits across Mori's. The grave of his second wife, Michiko Tsushima (née Ishihara), is also located in the temple; she was buried there after her death in 1997.

The temple also contains two memorials. The first is for the victims of the Great Fire of Meireki (明暦の大火, Meireki no taika), which in 1657 destroyed a majority of Edo. A memorial tower, the Jusan-tō (十三塔, meaning thirteen towers), was erected in 1956. The second is for the victims of the Mitaka Incident, a 1949 railway accident at the Mitaka Station that took the lives of six people and injured 20 others.

The Zenrin-ji Museum, also on the premises, is a repository of over 10,000 books across a variety of topics, collected from across Japan. While the collection includes Buddhism-related texts, it also includes Indian religious scriptures, such as the Vedas, the Upanishads, the Ramayana, the Mahabharata, and texts on Sanskrit grammar. Historical and geographical materials pertaining to China are also retained, and collections on Chinese ethnic minorities and contemporary environmental issues are listed. Additionally, literary works by Osamu Dazai and Ōgai Mori are featured. The museum also has a tea room for the conduct of tea gatherings and other such events.

== Facilities ==
The temple has two funeral halls, for which reservations are accepted. The temple accepts users regardless of religion or denomination (including non-religious persons). The temple also has the Lotus Pond Pagoda (蓮池塔, Hasuike-tō), which is a communal grave for persons with no surviving family to perform memorial rites, or those who will be left without such family in the future. Reservations for the service are accepted during one's lifetime.

The temple also houses the Tokyo Obaku Research Institute, which conducts research primarily focused on the Obaku and Zen Buddhist schools. It was established in 1995, and solicited academic papers annually until the end of the Heisei era (2018).

== Access ==
The temple is an approximately fifteen-minute walk (1 kilometre) from the Mitaka Station on the Chuo Line (Rapid), and commuters are advised to use the station's southern exit when using this mode of transport. Alternatively, the Hachiman-mae (八幡前) bus stop is located near the temple, and is the recommended stop to alight at for commuters using the bus.

It takes approximately 40 minutes by car from the Tokyo city centre to reach the temple, as the temple is approximately 24 kilometres from the Tokyo Station. Paid parking is available for cars and two-wheel vehicles at the premises.

== See also ==
- Ōbaku school
- Manpuku-ji
