= No Longer Human =

1948 novel by Osamu Dazai

- Cover of first edition
- Author: Osamu Dazai
- Original title: 人間失格
- Translator: Donald Keene; Mark Gibeau; Juliet Winters Carpenter
- Language: Japanese
- Publisher: Chikuma Shobō
- Publication date: 1948
- Publication place: Japan
- English publication date: 1958
- Media type: Print
- Preceded by: A Cherry
- Followed by: Goodbye

No Longer Human (Japanese: 人間失格, Hepburn: Ningen Shikkaku), also translated as A Shameful Life, is a 1948 novel by Japanese author Osamu Dazai. It tells the story of a troubled man incapable of revealing his true self to others, and who, instead, maintains a façade of hollow jocularity, later turning to a life of alcoholism and drug abuse before his final disappearance. The original title translates as "Disqualified as a human being" or "A failed human". The book was published one month after Dazai's suicide at the age of 38. No Longer Human is considered a classic of postwar Japanese literature and Dazai's masterpiece. It enjoys considerable popularity among younger readers and ranks as the second-best-selling novel by publishing house Shinchōsha, behind Natsume Sōseki's Kokoro.

== Plot ==
No Longer Human is told in the form of notebooks left behind by the principal character, Ōba Yōzō (大庭葉蔵). There are three notebooks chronicling Ōba's life from his early childhood to his late twenties. The notebooks are bookended by a preface and an epilogue by a nameless narrator, who is given Ōba's notebooks by a mutual acquaintance ten years after they had been written.

=== The First Notebook ===
The first notebook focuses on Yōzō Ōba's childhood, and extreme difficulty with understanding other people. Ōba is born into a decent and well-off family, but is abused and corrupted by the servants of the household as a child. He is too accustomed to hiding his feelings and doubting other people to confide in anyone regarding the abuse.

He struggles with the constant feelings of alienation and confusion with the behavior of other people, causing him to fear them. Ōba resorts to mimicking others to hide his sense of being utterly different, and developing a comic character in his early years to establish interpersonal relationships, defining it as the last resort to find love from others.

He also describes numerous times how his antics are a way to avoid provoking anger and to not be taken seriously to avoid reprimands. Ōba is obsessed with the fear that someone might realize he is acting and expose his character.

=== The Second Notebook ===
As time goes on, Ōba becomes increasingly concerned over the potential exposure of his imitative cheerful façade when his schoolmate Takeichi sees through one of his false buffooneries. Ōba befriends him to prevent Takeichi from revealing his secret. Inspired by a painting of Van Gogh that Takeichi shows him, he starts to paint to express his inner agony through art. Ōba paints a self-portrait which is so dreadful that he dares not show it to anyone except Takeichi, who predicts his future as a great artist.

After finishing high school, Ōba is sent to Tokyo to attend university. Influenced by a fellow artist, Horiki, whom he meets at a painting class, Ōba descends into a pattern of drinking, smoking, and harlotry, and attends communist meetings without being a staunch follower. After spending the night with a married woman, he attempts to commit shinjū (double suicide) with her by drowning. He survives while she dies, leaving him with an excruciating feeling of guilt.

=== The Third Notebook: Part One ===
Ōba is expelled from university and comes under the care of a friend of the family. During this time, he meets a single mother who is an acquaintance of Horiki and tries to have a normal relationship with her, serving as a surrogate father to her little girl, but soon, he returns to his drinking habits and his fear of humanity; he eventually abandons them. He then lives with the madam of a bar before he meets Yoshiko, a young and inexperienced woman who wants him to stop drinking.

=== The Third Notebook: Part Two ===
Thanks to Yoshiko's grounding influence on his life, Ōba stops drinking and finds gainful work as a cartoonist. Then Horiki shows up, turning Ōba to self-destructive behavior again. Worse, at the moment of recalling Crime and Punishment by Dostoevsky while he discusses the antonym of crime with Horiki, Yoshiko is sexually assaulted by a casual acquaintance. The terror and despair brought on by this incident estranges Ōba from his wife and leads him to another suicide attempt with soporific drugs.

Released from the hospital where he was taken after his suicide attempt, Ōba becomes a morphine addict. He is confined to a mental institution and, upon release, moves to an isolated place with his brother's help, concluding the story with the comment that he feels neither happy nor unhappy now.

== Themes ==
The novel, narrated in first person, is categorized under the semi-autobiographical genre since the characters in the book are all fictional. The novel presents recurring themes in the author's life, including suicide, social alienation, addiction, and depression. Much like the protagonist Yōzō, Dazai attempted suicide a total of five times in his lifetime, with consorts, until ultimately succeeding in taking his own life with his lover at the time, a woman named Tomie Yamazaki.

=== Alienation ===
Identity closely correlates with social identity, i.e. the way individuals define themselves and others in relation to their social group, with the failure to achieve this leading to alienation from oneself, from others and from society at large. Early in his life, Ōba discovered that people around him all shared a hidden nature which emerged when anger makes them reveal in a flash human nature in all its horror. He believed this trait was a prerequisite for survival as a human being, which shows that Ōba understood this trait was crucial for people to be categorized as members of the “human beings” social category. In his later childhood years, Ōba furthermore noted how “human beings” lived in mutual distrust and were deceiving one another.

==== Alienation from society ====
Ōba himself lacked the strength to act in accordance with this truth and had no special interest in instances of mutual deception, which indicates that Ōba remained unwilling to behave similarly to the members of the “human beings” in-group. Individuals are most likely to behave like in-group members only if they feel that the in-group is important to them or if they desire the social identity derived from the group. Despite his inability to belong to the in-group, Ōba recognized that favoritism must inevitably exist among human beings and they will show a form of negative bias towards members of the out-group. Therefore, since people around Ōba (the “human beings”) perceived such outcasts as negative, Ōba’s own social identity as a member of the out-group would likewise be negative.

His apprehension and terror at interaction with others lead to avoidant behavior, a sign that he experienced alienation from others as well. Ōba felt very timid about meeting people and despite becoming acquainted with a number of people through his attempts to please people and to meet their expectations, he had not once actually experienced friendship. Since Ōba kept his interactions with people to a necessary minimum, he could not develop an understanding about others which caused his inability to connect emotionally with others. His avoidant behavior might have likewise been a sign of social anxiety he unknowingly had. His fear of interactions and difficulty in maintaining conversations would also cause him to decrease his engagement with others.

==== Alienation from self ====
His refusal to change the state of his social identity is in contradiction to the theory that individuals will attempt to improve their self-confidence if threatened. Ōba’s own perspective was therefore so greatly influenced by the perspective of the people around himself that he thought there would be no benefit in attempting to change himself. His fear of people finding out he was a member of the out-group living among them was so great that it induced an assault of apprehension and terror, i.e. his lack of confidence in interacting with other people and their possible negative opinion of him resulted in Ōba developing low self-esteem. As "human beings" perceived anything different as negative, Ōba developed a negative perception of himself as well.

Ōba believed using the clown persona would help mask his membership in the out-group, help him conform to societal expectations and connect to the world. This however resulted in alienation from himself as he often struggled to understand his own desires. An example of this is given on the occasion when his father traveled to Tokyo and asked his children what they wanted. Despite not knowing what he wanted himself, Ōba nonetheless pretended he would like a lion mask to meet the expectation of his father and family. His inability to recognize his own desires, as well as his masking them to act in accordance with people’s expectations are signs that he was alienated from himself.

The clown persona was in fact a mask which Ōba crafted in order to maintain harmony in his social environment and mask his fear of humans, despite the fact that such an act was tortuous to him, as it was not his true personality. He kept his feeling of anxiety and depression hidden within himself and acted happy and innocent, pretending at times to be naive. This caused further disconnect from others and alienation from himself, like a clown who appeared happy on the outside, but was unable to find peace inside himself anymore.

=== Divine punishment ===
Dazai first began to study the Bible between 13 October and 12 November 1936, after he was hospitalized at the Tokyo Musashino Hospital in order to cure his addiction to Pabinal. He was deeply influenced by Uchimura Kanzō, whose teachings were grounded in the Calvinistic tradition and preached a puritanical worldview that centered on the image of a strict Christian God. The image of an unforgiving and irate God, the existence of hell and predetermination were reinforced by Dazai’s sense of guilt at the death of Tanabe Shimeko, with whom he had attempted a double suicide, as well as by personal setbacks in his failure to secure an important position with a major newspaper and the fact that he had not been selected for the Akutagawa Prize at the time.

Similarly, the protagonist of the novel believed in the existence of divine punishment, but was unable to believe in divine love. In the third notebook, when the five-year old Shigeko asked him whether God will truly grant you anything if you pray for it, Oba stated: I was frightened by God. I could not believe in His love, only in His punishment. Faith. That, I felt, was the act of facing the tribunal of justice with one’s head bowed to receive the scourge of God. I could believe in hell, but it was impossible for me to believe in the existence of heaven.

Loyalty and betrayal are frequent motifs in Dazai’s novels which extend to God and can be traced back to the author’s betrayal of Tanabe Shimeko, his communist comrades, as well as his own family. This theme appeared towards the end of No Longer Human, in a dialectical diatribe between the protagonist and the Almighty, during which Oba asks whether trustfulness is a sin. The characters in the novel appear to have no agency in regards to their morals and are doomed as they are unable to alter the course of their destiny. The protagonist’s cry to God was his last futile resort - he is resigned to the inevitability of sin and acknowledges that not even God can be trusted.

== Legacy ==
In his 2014 review of No Longer Human, William Bradbury of The Japan Times called it a timeless novel, saying that the "struggle of the individual to fit into a normalizing society remains just as relevant today as it was at the time of writing." He also pointed out that the "blunt" style distanced the book from the tone of an actual autobiography, despite the similarities to Dazai's own personal life. Serdar Yegulalp of Genji Press noted (in 2007) the strength of Dazai in portraying the situation of the protagonist, describing the novel as "bleak in a way that is both extreme and yet also strangely unforced".

The novel was introduced to a wider audience in the early 2020s by becoming a sensation on the social media platform TikTok.

== English translations ==
The novel was first translated into English by Donald Keene as No Longer Human, published in 1958 by New Directions in Norfolk, Connecticut. This translation was published in the UK by Peter Owen Publishers in 1959.

The novel received another English translation in 2018 by Mark Gibeau as A Shameful Life, published by Stone Bridge Press.

In March 2024, Tuttle Publishing published a new translation by Juliet Winters Carpenter, returning to the title No Longer Human.

A fourth English translation, by David Boyd, is scheduled to be published by Penguin Random House as a part of their Penguin Classics line on May 4, 2027, again as No Longer Human.

== Notable adaptations ==
=== Film ===
- 2010: The Fallen Angel (dir. Genjirō Arato)
- 2019: Human Lost (dir. Fuminori Kizaki)

=== Anime series ===
- 2009: Aoi Bungaku

=== Manga ===
- 2009: No Longer Human by Usamaru Furuya
- 2017: No Longer Human by Junji Itō

=== Musical theatre ===
- 2021: No Longer Human stage musical adaptation with music by Frank Wildhorn, with the world premiere first taking place in December 2021 at the Shanghai Grand Theatre.

=== Music ===
- 1990: Ningen Shikkaku by Ningen Isu

== See also ==
- Dazai Osamu
- Postwar Japan
