= The Setting Sun =

Novel by Osamu Dazai

- Cover of first edition
- Author: Osamu Dazai
- Original title: 斜陽
- Translator: Donald Keene; Juliet Winters Carpenter
- Language: Japanese
- Publisher: Shinchō (magazine); Shinchōsha (book)
- Publication date: 1947
- Publication place: Japan
- English publication date: 1956
- Media type: Print

The Setting Sun (斜陽, Shayō) is a Japanese novel by Osamu Dazai first published in 1947. The story centers on an aristocratic family in decline and crisis during the early years after World War II.

== Plot summary ==
Twenty-nine-year-old Kazuko, her brother Naoji, and their widowed mother are members of an impoverished aristocratic family living in post-war Tokyo. Kazuko had been married, but divorced and returned to the family household after claiming that she had had an extramarital affair with a painter she admired. The child she had been expecting was stillborn. Naoji, who served with the military in the South Pacific, is declared missing. Kazuko recalls a time when she burned snake eggs, thinking that they were viper eggs. It is revealed that at the time of Kazuko's father's death, there were many snakes present in and around the house, which therefore have become ominous in her and her mother's eyes.

Kazuko and her mother move to the Izu Peninsula countryside with the help of a relative, and she begins working in the fields to support them, claiming to be growing into a "coarse woman". One day, Naoji eventually returns. He is addicted to opium as he had been before the war. He treats his mother and sister cruelly, and spends most of the time among Tokyo's literary circles which he had been associated with before he was drafted. Kazuko finds Naoji's "Moonflower Journal," in which he rants about people's bigotry and insincerity, and writes about his addiction and his struggles as a writer and individual.

Kazuko writes to novelist Uehara, an old acquaintance and mentor of her brother, whom she once met when she was still married. She declares that she loves and adores him and wants to have his child, although she knows that he is an alcoholic. She repeatedly refers to ideas of Christianity and Marxism, having read a book by Rosa Luxemburg which she found in her brother's belongings, and dedicates the letters to "M.C.", resolving the initials both as "My Chekhov" and "My Child". He does not respond. Meanwhile, her mother's health is deteriorating, and she is diagnosed with tuberculosis. Kazuko sees a black snake on the porch and remembers how her father died when one was present. Soon after, her mother dies.

Kazuko eventually meets Uehara, years after their first encounter. Shortly after, Naoji dies by suicide, leaving behind a letter to his sister which gives his feelings of weakness over his aristocratic descent as the reason, also denouncing all ideologies which suppress the individual. The story ends with a letter by Kazuko to Uehara. She reveals that she is pregnant, and wants to raise the child on her own, disposing of the old morality and embracing a new revolutionary way of life. She ends the letter addressing Uehara once again as M.C., this time resolving the initials as "My Comedian".

== Publication history ==
The Setting Sun first appeared in serialised form in Shinchō magazine between July and October 1947, before being published as a book the same year.

An English edition appeared in September 1956 in a translation provided by Donald Keene. The first two chapters had been printed in Harper's Bazaar the previous month.

In March 2024, Tuttle Publishing released the English version of Osamu Dazai's The Setting Sun: The Manga Edition, Cocco Kashiwaya's illustrated manga retelling of the novel. In May 2025, Tuttle published a new translation of the novel by Juliet Winters Carpenter.

== Background ==
The character of Kazuko was modeled after writer and poet Shizuko Ota (1913–1982), a mistress of the then-married Dazai. Her diary served as the basis for Kazuko's notes.

== Legacy ==
Osamu's novel is nowadays widely regarded as his best-known work, which "created an immediate sensation" (Keene) upon its first appearance. It has been touted as an accurate portrait of post-war Japan, and its title became eponymous for the decline of the Japanese aristocracy of the time.
