= Osamu Dazai =

Japanese writer (1909–1948)

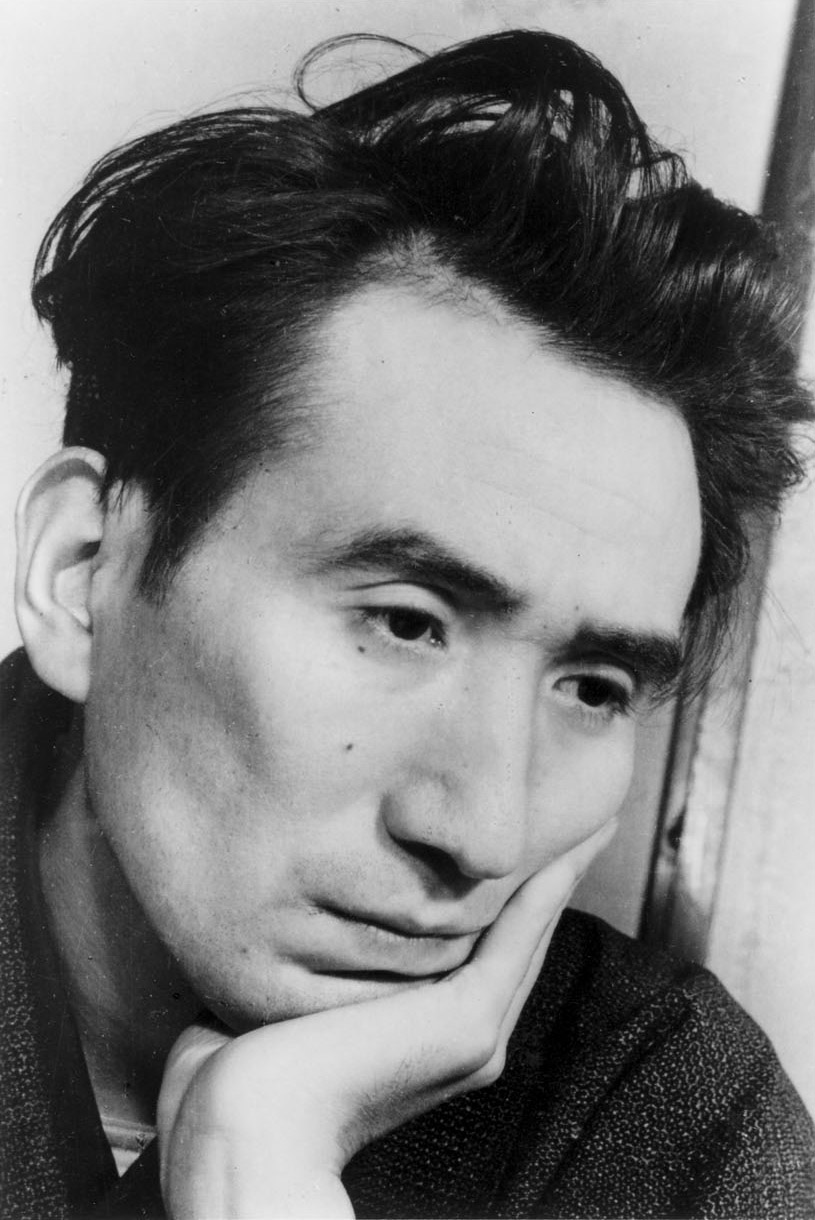
- Dazai in 1948
- Born: Shūji Tsushima; 19 June 1909; Kanagi, Aomori, Japan
- Died: 13 June 1948 (aged 38); Tokyo, Japan
- Writing career
- Notable works: "Run, Melos!" (1940); Otogi-zôshi (1945); The Setting Sun (1947); No Longer Human (1948)
- Movements: I-Novel; Buraiha

Japanese name
- Kanji: 太宰 治
- Hiragana: だざい おさむ
Transcriptions
- Romanization: Dazai Osamu

Shūji Tsushima (津島 修治, Tsushima Shūji; 19 June 1909 – 13 June 1948), known by his pen name Osamu Dazai (太宰 治, Dazai Osamu), was a Japanese writer. A number of his most popular works, such as The Setting Sun (斜陽, Shayō) and No Longer Human (人間失格, Ningen Shikkaku), are considered modern classics.

His influences include Ryūnosuke Akutagawa, Murasaki Shikibu and Fyodor Dostoevsky. His last book, No Longer Human, is his most popular work outside of Japan.

Another pseudonym he used was Shunpei Kuroki (黒木 舜平), for the book Illusion of the Cliffs (断崖の錯覚, Dangai no Sakkaku).

== Early life ==
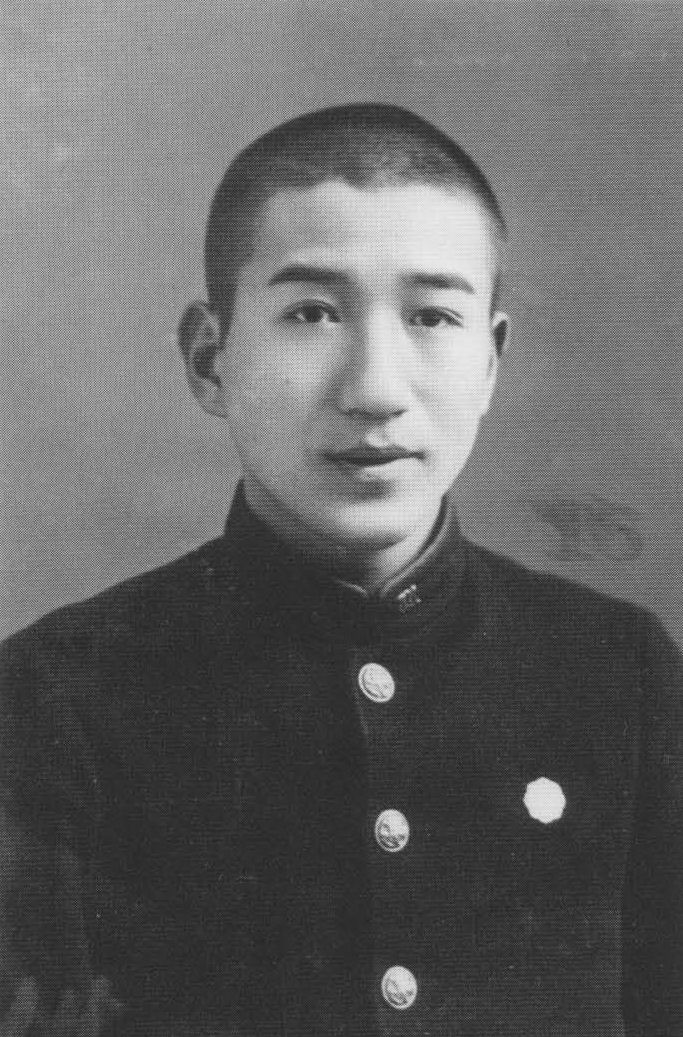
Dazai in a high school yearbook photo

Shūji Tsushima was born on 19 June 1909, the eighth surviving child of a wealthy landowner and politician in Kanagi, located at the northern tip of the Tōhoku Region, in Aomori Prefecture. He was the tenth of the eleven children born to his parents. At the time of his birth, the huge, newly completed Tsushima mansion, where he spent his early years, was home to some thirty family members. The Tsushima family came from humble peasant origins. Dazai's great-grandfather built up the family's wealth as a moneylender, and his son increased it further. They quickly rose in power and, after some time, became highly respected across the region.

Dazai's father, Gen'emon, was a younger son of the Matsuki family, which, due to "its exceedingly 'feudal' tradition," had no use for sons other than the eldest son and heir. As a result, Gen'emon was adopted into the Tsushima family to marry the eldest daughter, Tane. He became involved in politics due to his position as one of the four wealthiest landowners in the prefecture, and was offered membership of the House of Peers. This caused Dazai's father to be absent during much of his early childhood. While his mother Tane was ill, Dazai was raised mainly by his aunt Kiye along with the family's servants, and was molested by many of the latter.

== Education and literary beginnings ==
In 1916, Dazai began his education at Kanagi Elementary. On 4 March 1923, his father Gen'emon died from lung cancer. A month later, in April, Dazai moved to Aomori Junior High School, followed in 1927 by Hirosaki Higher School, a university preparatory school. He developed an interest in the culture of the Edo period and began studying gidayū, a form of chanted narration used in bunraku. Around 1928, Dazai edited a series of student publications and contributed some of his own works. He also published a magazine called Saibō Bungei (Cell Literature) with his friends, and subsequently became a staff member of the college's newspaper.

Dazai's success in writing was brought to a halt when his idol, the writer Ryūnosuke Akutagawa, committed suicide in 1927 at 35 years old. Dazai started to neglect his studies, and spent the majority of his allowance on clothes, alcohol, and prostitutes. He also dabbled in Marxism, which at the time was heavily suppressed by the government.

On the night of 10 December 1929, Dazai made his first suicide attempt by overdosing on Calmotin, but survived and was able to graduate the following year. In 1930, he enrolled in the French literature department of Tokyo Imperial University. Dazai knew no French when he elected this course (and apparently, through a complete neglect of his studies, never learned more than a few words), but at the time French literature was the chosen field of many young Japanese. In October, he ran away with a geisha named Hatsuyo Oyama and was formally disowned by his family.

In 1930, ten days after he was suspended from Tokyo Imperial University for non-payment of fees, Dazai attempted double suicide by drowning off a beach in Kamakura while simultaneously overdosing on Calmotin, with a 19-year-old bar hostess named Shimeko Tanabe. Tanabe died, but Dazai lived. He was rescued by the crew of a fishing boat, and was charged as an accomplice in Tanabe's death. Alarmed by the events, Dazai's family intervened to stop the police investigation. His allowance was reinstated, and he was released without any charges. In December, he recovered at Ikarigaseki and married Hatsuyo there.

== Leftist movement ==
In 1929, when the principal of Hirosaki Higher School was found to have misappropriated public funds, the students, under the leadership of Ueda Shigehiko (Ishigami Genichiro), leader of the Social Science Study Group, staged a five-day strike, which resulted in the principal's resignation and no disciplinary action against the students. Dazai hardly participated in the strike, but in imitation of the Japanese proletarian literature of the time, he summarized the incident in a novel called Student Group and read it to Ueda. The Tsushima family was wary of Dazai's leftist activities. On 16 January of the following year, the Special High Police arrested Ueda and nine other students of the Hiroko Institute of Social Studies, who were working as activists for Seigen Tanaka's Communist Party.

In college, Dazai met activist Eizo Kudo, and made a monthly financial contribution of ten yen to the Japanese Communist Party. He was expelled from his family after his marriage to Hatsuyo Oyama in order to prevent any association of his illegal activities with his brother Bunji, who was a politician. After his marriage, Dazai was ordered to hide his sympathies and moved repeatedly. In July 1932, Bunji tracked him down, and had him turn himself in at the Aomori Police Station. In December, Dazai signed and sealed a pledge at the Aomori Prosecutor's Office to completely withdraw from leftist activities.

== Early literary career ==
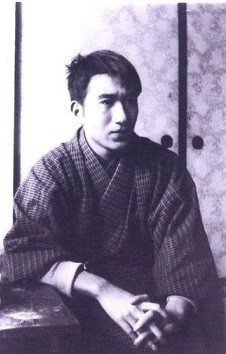
Dazai in 1928

Dazai kept his promise and settled down. He managed to obtain the assistance of Masuji Ibuse, an established writer whose connections helped him get his works published and establish his reputation. The next few years were productive for Dazai. He wrote at a feverish pace and used the pen name "Osamu Dazai" for the first time in a short story called "Ressha" ("列車", "Train"), published in 1933. This story was his first experiment with the I-novel form that later became his trademark.

In 1935 it started to become clear to Dazai that he would not graduate. This was not surprising when one considers that he boasted of not having attended a single lecture in five years. He also failed to obtain a job at a Tokyo newspaper. He finished The Final Years (Bannen), which was intended to be his farewell to the world, and tried to hang himself on 19 March 1935, failing yet again. Less than three weeks later, he developed acute appendicitis and was hospitalized. In the hospital, he became addicted to Pavinal, a morphine-based painkiller. After fighting the addiction for a year, in October 1936 he was taken to a mental institution, locked in a room and forced to quit cold turkey. The treatment lasted over a month.

During this time Dazai's wife Hatsuyo committed adultery with his best friend Zenshirō Kodate. This eventually came to light, and on 15 March 1937, Dazai attempted to commit shinjū (joint suicide) with his wife by overdosing on Calmotin, but neither died. Soon after, Dazai divorced Hatsuyo. He quickly remarried, this time to a middle school teacher named Michiko Ishihara. Their first daughter, Sonoko, was born in June 1941.

The year before last I was expelled from my family and, reduced to poverty overnight, was left to wander the streets, begging help for various quarters, barely managing to stay alive from one day to the next, and just when I'd begun to think I might be able to support myself with my writing, I came down with a serious illness. Thanks to the compassion of others, I was able to rent a small house in Funabashi, Chiba, next to the muddy sea, and spent the summer there alone, convalescing. Though battling an illness that each and every night left my robe literally drenched with sweat, I had no choice but to press ahead with my work. The cold half pint of milk I drank each morning was the only thing that gave me a certain peculiar sense of the joy in life; my mental anguish and exhaustion were such that the oleanders blooming in one corner of the garden appeared to me merely flicking tongues of flame...

— Seascape with Figures in Gold (1939), Osamu Dazai, trans. Ralph F. McCarthy (1992)

In the 1930s and 1940s, Dazai wrote a number of novels and short stories that are autobiographical in nature. His first story, Gyofukuki (魚服記, "Transformation", 1933), is a grim fantasy involving suicide. Other stories written during this period include Dōke no hana (道化の花, "Flowers of Buffoonery", 1935), Gyakkō (逆行, "Losing Ground", 1935), Kyōgen no kami (狂言の神, "The God of Farce", 1936), an epistolary novel called Kyokō no Haru (虚構の春, False Spring, 1936) and the stories in the collection Bannen (1936; Declining Years or The Final Years) and Josei-to( "Schoolgirl", 1939), which describe his sense of personal isolation and his debauchery.

== Wartime years ==
Dazai was excused from the draft during World War II because of his chronic chest problems, as he was diagnosed with tuberculosis. The censors became more reluctant to accept his work, but he managed to publish anyway. In contrast to other literary publications coming out in the wake of Pearl Harbor with praises of the date of December 8 and the new unified will of the nation, Dazai published a work entitled Jūnigatsu Yōka (十二月八日, "December 8", 1942) depicting a poor housewife needing to take care of her daily necessities as though it were any other day. This has been noted as a very rare rejection of the overwhelming intellectual depiction of national commitment to the war.

A number of the stories that he published during the war were retellings of stories by Ihara Saikaku (1642–1693). Dazai's wartime works include Udaijin Sanetomo (右大臣実朝, "Minister of the Right Sanetomo", 1943), Tsugaru (1944), Pandora no Hako (パンドラの匣, Pandora's Box, 1945–46), and Otogizōshi (お伽草紙, Fairy Tales, 1945) in which he retells a number of Japanese fairy tales.

Dazai's house was burned down twice in the American bombing of Tokyo, but his family escaped unscathed and gained a son, Masaki, who was born in 1944. His third child, his daughter Satoko, who later became a writer under the pseudonym Yūko Tsushima, was born in May 1947.

== Postwar career ==
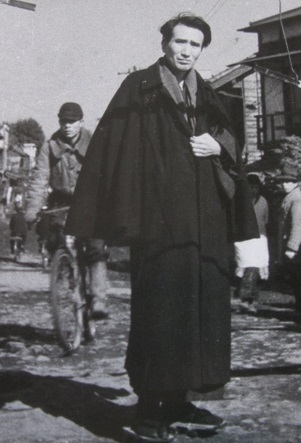
Dazai in 1947–1948

In the immediate postwar period, Dazai reached the height of his popularity. He depicted a dissolute life in postwar Tokyo in Viyon no Tsuma (ヴィヨンの妻, "Villon's Wife", 1947), depicting the wife of a poet who had abandoned her and her continuing will to live through hardships.

In 1946, Dazai published a controversial memoir, Kuno no Nenkan ("Almanac of Pain"), in which he describes the immediate aftermath of Japan's defeat and seeks to encapsulate how the Japanese felt at the time. Dazai reaffirmed his loyalty to Hirohito, the Emperor of Japan, and his son Akihito. However, Dazai also expressed his Communist beliefs in this memoir. Dazai also wrote Jugonenkan (For Fifteen Years), another autobiographical piece.

On 14 December 1946, a group of writers that included Dazai was joined by Yukio Mishima for dinner at a restaurant. The latter recalled that on that occasion, he gave vent to his dislike of Dazai. According to a later statement by Mishima:

The disgust in which I hold Dazai's literature is in some way ferocious. First, I dislike his face. Second, I dislike his rustic preference for urban sophistication. Third, I dislike the fact that he played roles that were not appropriate for him.

Other participants at the dinner could not remember if events occurred as Mishima described. They did report that he did not enjoy Dazai's "clowning" and that he and Dazai had a dispute about Ōgai Mori, a writer whom Mishima admired.

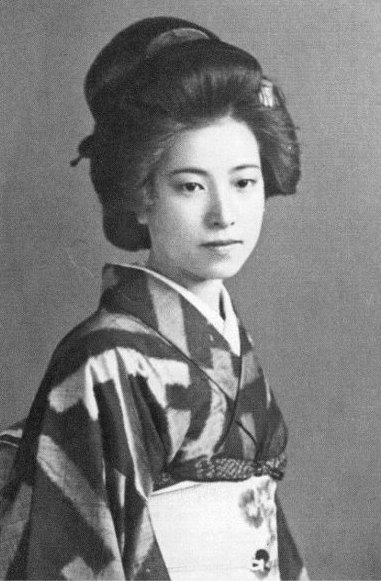
Tomie Yamazaki, Dazai's last lover

In July 1947, Dazai's novel Shayo (The Setting Sun, translated 1956) was published. It depicts the decline of the Japanese nobility after the war. It was partly based on the diary of Shizuko Ōta, an admirer of Dazai's work who first met him in 1941. The pair had a daughter, the writer Ōta Haruko in 1947.

A heavy drinker, Dazai became an alcoholic and his health deteriorated rapidly. At this time he met Tomie Yamazaki, a beautician whose husband had been killed in the war after just ten days of marriage. Dazai abandoned his wife and children and moved in with Tomie.

Dazai began writing his novel No Longer Human (人間失格 Ningen Shikkaku, 1948) at the onsen in Atami. He then moved to Ōmiya with Tomie and stayed there until mid-May 1948, finishing his novel. A quasi-autobiography, it depicts a self-destructive young man who believes that he is disqualified from being human. The book has been translated into several languages.

In the spring of 1948, Dazai worked on Goodbye, a novella scheduled to be serialized in the Asahi Shimbun. It was never finished.

== Death ==
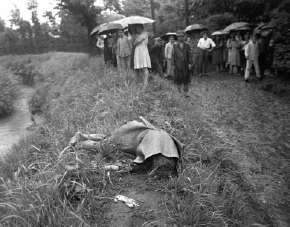
Dazai and Tomie's bodies discovered in 1948

On 13 June 1948, Dazai and Tomie drowned themselves in the rain-swollen Tamagawa Aqueduct, near his house. Their bodies were not discovered until six days later, on June 19, which would have been his 39th birthday.

At the time, there was a lot of speculation about the incident. Keikichi Nakahata, a kimono merchant who frequented the young Tsushima family, was shown the scene of the suicide by a detective from Mitaka police station. He speculated that "Dazai was asked to die, and he simply agreed, but just before his death, he suddenly felt an obsession with life."

Dazai's grave is within the Zenrin-ji temple in Mitaka, Tokyo. It faces the grave of Mori Ōgai, whom Dazai respected.

== Works ==
Works
Japanese title [Romaji]	English title	Published	Translator
ア、秋 [A, Aki]	A. Autumn	1939	
愛と美について [Ai to bi ni tsuite]	About Love and Beauty	1939	
老ハイデルベルヒ [Alt-Heidelberg]	Alt-Heidelberg	1940	
雨の玉川心中 [Ame no Tamagawa shinjū]	Rain at Tamagawa - Double Suicide		
兄たち [Anitachi]	My Older Brothers	1940	McCarthy; O'Brien
青森 [Aomori]	Aomori	1941	
或る忠告 [Aru chūkoku]	Advice	1942	
朝 [Asa]	Morning	1947	Brudnoy and Yumi
あさましきもの [Asamashiki mono]	Something Regrettable	1937	
新しい形の個人主義 [Atarashii katachi no kojin shugi]	A New Form of Individualism	1980	
「晩年」と「女生徒」 ["Bannen" to "Joseito"]	"The Last Years" and "Schoolgirl"	1948	
「晩年」に就いて ["Bannen" ni tsuite]	About "The Final Years“	1936	
美男子と煙草 [Bidanshi to tabako]	Handsome Devils and Cigarettes	1948	McCarthy
美少女 [Bishōjo]	A Little Beauty	1939	McCarthy
眉山 [Bizan]	Bizan	1948	
チャンス [Chansu]	Chance	1946	
父 [Chichi]	The Father	1947	Brudnoy and Yumi
小さいアルバム [Chiisai arubamu]	The Little Album	1942	
畜犬談 —伊馬鵜平君に与える— [Chikukendan - Ima Uhei-kun ni ataeru -]	Canis familiaris	1939	McCarthy
竹青 [Chikusei]	Blue Bamboo	1945	McCarthy
地球図 [Chikyūzu]	Chikyūzu (or World’s Map)	1935	
千代女 [Chiyojo]	Chiyojo	1941	Dunlop
地図 [Chizu]	The Map	1925	
大恩は語らず [Daion wa katarazu]	A Great Favour is Not Expressed	1954	
断崖の錯覚 [Dangai no sakkaku]	Illusion of the Cliffs	1934	
檀君の近業について [Dan-kun no kingyō ni tsuite]	About the Latest Works by Dan-kun	1937	
男女同権 [Danjo dōken]	Gender Equality	1946	
誰 [Dare]	Who	1941	
誰も知らぬ [Dare mo shiranu]	Nobody Knows	1940	
ダス・ゲマイネ [Dasu Gemaine]	Das Gemeine	1935	O'Brien
デカダン抗議 [Dekadan kōgi]	Decadent Protest	1939	
貪婪禍 [Donranka]	The Scourge of Greed	1940	
道化の華 [Dōke no hana]	The Flowers of Buffoonery	1935	
炎天汗談 [Enten kandan]	Bottomless Hell	1942	
フォスフォレッスセンス [Fosuforessensu]	The Pitiable Mosquitoes	1947	
富嶽百景 [Fugaku hyakkei]	One Hundred Views of Mount Fuji	1939	McCarthy
富士に就いて [Fuji ni tsuite]	About Mount Fuji	1938	
服装に就いて [Fukusō ni tsuite]	About Clothing	1941	O'Brien
不審庵 [Fushin'an]	Doubtful Retreat	1943	
冬の花火 [Fuyu no hanabi]	Winter Fireworks	1946	
玩具 [Gangu]	Toys	1935	O'Brien
芸術ぎらい [Geijutsu girai]	Dislike of Art	1944	
義務 [Gimu]	Duty	1940	
五所川原 [Goshogawara]	Goshogawara	1941	
グッド・バイ [Guddo Bai]	Goodbye	1948	Marshall
逆行 [Gyakkō]	Losing Ground	1935	
魚服記 [Gyofukuki]	Metamorphosis	1933	O'Brien
魚服記に就て [Gyofukuki ni tsuite]	About the Story of Fish and Clothing	1933	
葉 [Ha]	Leaves	1934	Gangloff
母 [Haha]	Mother	1947	Brudnoy and Yumi
八十八夜 [Hachijūhachiya]	The 88th Day	1939	
恥 [Haji]	Shame	1942	Dunlop
薄明 [Hakumei]	Early Light	1946	McCarthy
花火 [Hanabi]	Fireworks	1929	
花吹雪 [Hanafubuki]	Falling Blossoms	1944	
犯人 [Hannin]	The Criminal	1948	
春 [Haru]	Spring	1980	
春の枯葉 [Haru no kareha]	Dry Leaves in Spring	1946	
春の盗賊 [Haru no tōzoku]	A Burglar in Spring	1940	
春夫と旅行できなかつた話 [Haruo to ryokō dekinakatsuta hanashi]	The Story of How I Couldn't Travel with Haruo		
走ラヌ名馬 [Hashiranu meiba]	The Unrunning Thoroughbred	1980	
走れメロス [Hashire Merosu]	Run, Melos!	1940	McCarthy; O'Brien
葉桜と魔笛 [Hazakura to mateki]	Cherry Blossoms and the Magic Flute	1939	
碧眼托鉢 [Hekigan takuhatsu]	The Blue-eyed Pilgrim	1936	
返事 [Henji]	Reply	1980	
皮膚と心 [Hifu to kokoro]	Skin and Heart	1939	
火の鳥 [Hi no tori]	The Phoenix	1939	
一つの約束 [Hitotsu no yakusoku]	One Promise	1944	
一問一答 [Ichimon ittō]	Questions and Answers	1942	
陰火 [Inka]	Inka (Will-o'-the-Wisp)	1936	
田舎者 [Inakamono]	The Country Bumpkin	1980	
一歩前進二歩退却 [Ippo zenshin nippo taikyaku]	One Step Forward, Two Steps Back	1938	
弱者の糧 [Jakusha no kate]	Food for the Weak	1980	
人物に就いて [Jinbutsu ni tsuite]	About Characters	1936	
自作を語る [Jisaku wo kataru]	Talking About My Work	1980	
自信の無さ [Jishin no nasa]	Lack of Confidence	1940	
女類 [Jorui]	Women	1948	
女生徒 [Joseito]	Schoolgirl	1939	Powell
十五年間 [Jūgonenkan]	For Fifteen Years	1946	
十二月八日 [Jūnigatsu yōka]	December 8th	1942	
純真 [Junshin]	Innocence	1980	
貨幣 [Kahei]	Currency	1946	O'Brien
佳日 [Kajitsu]	Happy Day	1944	
駈込み訴え [Kakekomi uttae]	Heed My Plea	1940	O'Brien
かくめい [Kakumei]	Revolution	1948	
鴎 [Kamome]	Seagull	1940	
【関連作品】([Kanren sakuhin])	Related Works		
彼は昔の彼ならず [Kare wa mukashi no kare narazu]	He Is Not the Man He Used to Be	1934	
花燭 [Kashoku]	Wedding Torches	1939	
かすかな声 [Kasukana koe]	A Faint Voice	1940	
家庭の幸福 [Katei no kōfuku]	Domestic Happiness	1939	
川端康成へ [Kawabata Yasunari e]	To Yasunari Kawabata	1935	
革財布 [kawa saifu]	Leather Wallet		
風の便り [Kaze no tayori]	News on the Wind	1941	
喝采 [Kessai]	Applause	1936	
帰去来 [Kikyorai]	Going Home	1943	Lyons
金錢の話 [Kinsen no hanashi]	A Story About Money	1943	
禁酒の心 [Kinshu no kokoro]	The Heart of a Teetotaller	1943	
きりぎりす [Kirigirisu]	Cricket	1940	
校長三代 [Kōchō sandai]	Three Generations of Principals	1939	
乞食学生 [kojiki gakusei]	The Beggar Student	1940	Sam Bett
心の王者 [Kokoro no ōja]	The King of the Heart	1940	
故郷 [Kokyō]	Homecoming	1943	O'Brien
このごろ [Kono goro]	Lately	1940	
困惑の弁 [Konwaku no ben]	A Plea of Confusion		
古典風 [Kotenfū]	In Classical Style	1940	
古典竜頭蛇尾 [Koten ryūtō dabi]	Classical Dragon Head and Snake Tail	1936	
九月十月十一月 [Kugatsu jūgatsu jūichigatsu]	September, October, November	1938	
國技館 (くにわざかん) [Kuni-waza-kann]	National Sumo Arena	1940	
苦悩の年鑑 [Kunō no nenkan]	Almanac of Pain	1946	Lyons
黒石の人たち [Kuroishi no hitotachi]	The People of Kuroishi		
狂言の神 [Kyōgen no kami]	The God of Farce	1936	
虚構の春 [Kyokō no haru]	False Spring	1936	
饗応夫人 [Kyōō fujin]	The Hospitable Lady	1948	
郷愁 [Kyōshū]	Nostalgia		
満願 [Mangan]	Complete Satisfaction	1938	Brudnoy and Kazuko; McCarthy
待つ [Matsu]	Waiting	1942	Brudnoy and Kazuko; Turvill; O'Brien
女神 [Megami]	The Goddess	1947	
めくら草紙 [Mekura zōshi]	The Blind Scroll	1936	
メリイクリスマス [Merii Kurisumasu]	Merry Christmas	1947	McCarthy
雌に就いて [Mesu ni tsuite]	Female	1947	McCarthy
未帰還の友に [Mikikan no tomo ni]	To an Unreturned Friend	1944	
みみずく通信 [Mimizuku tsūshin]	The Owl Newspaper	1941	
男女川と羽左衛門 [Minanogawa to Uzaemon]	The River and Uzaemon	1935	
盲人独笑 [Mōjin Dokushō]	The Blind Man's Laughter		
文盲自嘲 [Monmō jichō]	The Illiterate's Laughter		
悶悶日記 [Monmon nikki]	Tormented Diary		
もの思う葦 [Monoomouashi]	A Thinking Reed		
無題 [Mudai]	Untitled		
無趣味 [Mushumi]	Lack of Interest		
二十世紀旗手 [Nijūseiki kishu]	A Standard-bearer of the Twentieth Century	1937	
「人間キリスト記」その他 ["Ningen kirisuto ki" sonota]	"Reports on Christ" and Others	1940	
人間失格 [Ningen Shikkaku]	No Longer Human	1948	Keene; Gibeau; Carpenter
庭 [Niwa]	The Garden	1946	McCarthy
如是我聞 [Nyoze Gamon]	Thus Have I Heard	1948	
女人訓戒 [Nyonin kunkai]	Advice for Women		
女人創造 [Nyonin sōzō]	Woman's Creation		
織田君の死 [Oda kun no shi]	The Death of Oda-kun		
緒方氏を殺した者 [Ogata shi wo koroshita mono]	The Murderer of Mr. Ogata	1937	
黄金風景 [Ōgon fūkei]	Golden Landscape	1941	Dunlop; McCarthy
思ひ出 [Omohide]	Memories	1933	Dunlop; Lyons; O'Brien
同じ星 [Onaji hoshi]	The Same Star		
女の決闘 [Onna no ketto]	Women's Duel	1940	
おさん [Osan]	Osan	1947	O'Brien
おしゃれ童子 [Oshare doji]	The Stylish Child	1939	
黄村先生言行録 [Ōson sensei genkōroku]	Mr. Oson's Records	1943	
桜桃 [Ōtō]	Cherries	1948	McCarthy
お伽草紙 [Otogizōshi]	Fairy Tales	1945	O'Brien
音に就いて [oto ni tsuite]	About Sound	1942	
親という二字 [Oya to iu niji]	The Word "Parents"		
パウロの混乱 [Pauro no konran]	Paul's Confusion		
パンドラの匣 [Pandora no hako]	Pandora's Box	1945	
懶惰の歌留多 [Randanokaruta]	The Lazy Game of Cards	1939	
ラロシフコー [Raroshifukō]	La Rochefoucauld	1935	
令嬢アユ [Reijō Ayu]	Miss Ayu	1934	
列車 [Ressha]	The Train	1933	McCarthy
リイズ [Riizu]	Liz	1940	
六月十九日 [Rokugatsu jūkunichi]	June 19th	1946	
ロマネスク [Romanesuku]	Romanesque	1934	
ろまん燈籠 [Romantōrō]	The Romantic Lantern	1947	
律子と貞子 [Ritsuko to Sadako]	Ritsuko and Sadako	1942	
佐渡 [Sado]	Sado	1941	
砂子屋 [Sagoya]	The Sandman	1941	
最後の太閤 [saigo no taikō]	The Last Taikō	1945	
酒ぎらい [sake girai]	The Teetotaler	1935	
酒の追憶 [sake no tsuioku]	Memories of Alcohol	1940	
作家の手帖 [Sakka no techō]	The Writer's Notebook	1946	
作家の像 [sakka no zō]	The Writer's Portrait	1943	
三月三十日 [sangatsu san jū nichi]	March 30th	1943	
散華 [Sange]	Fallen Flowers	1945	Swann
猿ヶ島 [Sarugashima]	The Monkey Island	1935	O'Brien
猿面冠者 [Sarumen kanja]	The Monkey-faced Man	1942	
正義と微笑 [Seigi to bisho]	Righteousness and Smiles	1942	
清貧譚 [seihin tan]	The Story of Poverty	1936	
政治家と家庭 [Seijika to katei]	The Politician and the Family	1943	
世界的 [Sekai-teki]	Worldly	1935	
惜別 [Sekibetsu]	Regretful Parting	1945	
赤心 [Sekishin]	Sincerity	1941	
先生三人 [Sensei sannin]	Three Teachers	1939	
斜陽 [Shayō]	The Setting Sun	1947	Keene
思案の敗北 [Shian no haiboku]	The Defeat of Deliberation	1936	
新ハムレット [Shinhamuretto]	New Hamlet	1941	
新樹の言葉 [Shinjunokotoba]	Words of the New Trees	1943	
新郎 [Shinro]	The Groom	1943	
新釈諸国噺 [Shinshakushokokubanashi]	New Interpretation of Country Stories	1945	O'Brien
親友交歓 [Shin'yūkōkan]	The Courtesy Call	1943	
失敗園 [Shippaien]	The Garden of Failure	1942	
知らない人 [Shiranai hito]	Unknown Person	1943	
【シリーズ好評既刊】([Shirīzu kōhyō kikan])	Successful Series	1941	
私信 [Shishin]	Private Letter	1940	
市井喧争 [Shisei kenso]	People's Disputes	1942	
正直ノオト [Shōjiki nōto]	Honest Notes	1938	
諸君の位置 [Shokun no ichi]	Your Positions	1940	
食通 [Shokutsu]	Gourmet	1942	
小志 [Shōshi]	Small Ambitions	1939	
小照 [Shōshō]	Little Light	1942	
小説の面白さ [Shōsetsunoomoshirosa]	The Fun of the Novel	1940	
秋風記 [Shūfūki]	Autumn Wind Story	1942	
春昼 [Shunchū]	Spring Day	1940	
創作余談 [sōsaku yodan]	Creation Side Notes	1936	
創生記 [sōseiki]	Creation Story	1946	
水仙 [Suisen]	Daffodils / Narcissus	1942	McCarthy
雀 [Suzume]	Sparrows	1946	
雀こ [Suzume ko]	Little Sparrow	1946	
多頭蛇哲学 [Ta atama hebi tetsugaku]	Philosophy of the Multi-headed Snake	1934	
田中君に就いて [Tanaka-kun ni tsuite]	About Mr. Tanaka	1937	
たずねびと [Tazune bito]	Seeker	1946	
天狗 [Tengu]	Tengu	1943	
鉄面皮 [Tetsumenpi]	Thick-skinned	1936	
答案落第 [tōan rakudai]	Examination Failure	1937	
トカトントン [Tokatonton]	The Sound of Hammering	1947	O'Brien
東京だより [Tōkyōda yori]	News from Tokyo	1941	
東京八景 [Tōkyō Hakkei]	Eight Views of Tokyo	1941	Lyons; McCarthy; O'Brien
燈籠 [Tōrō]	Lantern	1937	
當選の日 [Tōsen no hi]	Election Day	1935	
徒党について [Totōnitsuite]	About Factions	1944	
津軽 [Tsugaru]	Tsugaru	1944	Marshall; Westerhoven
津輕地方とチエホフ [Tsugaru chihō to chiehofu]	Tsugaru Region and Chekhov	1938	
姥捨 [Ubasute]	Putting Granny Out to Die	1938	O'Brien
右大臣実朝 [Udaijinsanetomo]	Sanetomo, Minister of the Right	1943	
鬱屈禍 [ukkutsuka]	The Hidden Curse	1940	
海 [Umi]	The Sea	1941	
嘘 [Uso]	Lie	1941	
やんぬる哉 [Yan'nurukana]	Unbearable	1937	
ヴィヨンの妻 [Viyon no tsuma]	Villon's Wife	1947	McCarthy
容貌 [Yobo]	Appearance	1936	
横綱 [Yokozuna]	Grand Champion	1940	
雪の夜の話 [Yuki no yo no hanashi]	Story of a Snowy Night	1936	Swann
わが愛好する言葉 [Waga aikō suru kotoba]	Words I Love	1936	
わが半生を語る [Wagahanseiwokataru]	My Half-Life	1937	
渡り鳥 [Wataridori]	Migratory Birds	1936	
私の著作集 [Watashinochosakushū]	My Collected Works	1944	
座興に非ず [zakyō ni hizu]	Not Just for Fun	1936	
俗天使 [Zoku tenshi]	The Common Angel	1947	
善蔵を思う [Zenzō wo omou]	Thinking of Zenzō	1946	

== In popular media ==
The character of Osamu Dazai in the manga series Bungo Stray Dogs (2012-present) is partly modeled on Dazai. The popularity of the character in the long-running series and its many anime and film adaptations have helped to revitalize Dazai's works.

In 2019, Mika Ninagawa directed the film Ningen Shikkaku: Osamu Dazai and the three women, a biographical film about Dazai, starring Shun Oguri. The film remained in the top 5 at the box office in its first 2 weeks.

== See also ==
- Dazai Osamu Prize
- List of Japanese writers
- Osamu Dazai Memorial Museum

== Sources ==
- O'Brien, James A., ed. Akutagawa and Dazai: Instances of Literary Adaptation. Cornell University Press, 1983.
- O'Brien, James, ed. (2024). The Real Osamu Dazai: A Life in Twenty Stories. Tuttle.
- Lyons, Phyllis I. (1985). The Saga of Dazai Osamu: A Critical Study with Translations. Stanford, Calif.: Stanford University Press. pp. 8, 21. ISBN 0804711976. OCLC 11210872.
- Sato, Hiroaki; Inose, Naoki (2012). Persona: A Biography of Yukio Mishima. Berkeley, California: Stone Bridge Press. ISBN 978-1-61172-008-2.
- "Nation and Region in the Work of Dazai Osamu," in Roy Starrs Japanese Cultural Nationalism: At Home and in the Asia Pacific. London: Global Oriental. 2004. ISBN 1-901903-11-7.
- Ueda, Makoto. Modern Japanese Writers and the Nature of Literature. Stanford University Press, 1976.
