= Jun Ishikawa =

Japanese author, translator and literary critic

Jun Ishikawa 石川 淳
- Ishikawa Jun
- Born: 7 March 1899; Tokyo, Japan
- Died: 29 December 1987 (aged 88); Tokyo, Japan
- Occupations: Writer, translator and literary critic
- Writing career
- Genres: novels, short stories, poetry, essays
- Notable work: Song of Mars
- Literary movement: Buraiha

Kiyoshi Ishikawa (石川 淳, Ishikawa Kiyoshi; 7 March 1899 – 29 December 1987), known by his pen name Jun Ishikawa (written in the same kanji), was a Japanese modernist author, translator and literary critic active during the Shōwa era.

== Early life ==
Ishikawa was born in the Asakusa district of Tokyo as the son of a banker. He graduated from the Tokyo School of Foreign Languages (東京外国語学校, later Tokyo University of Foreign Studies) with a degree in French literature. After graduation, he served a tour of duty in the Imperial Japanese Navy from 1922 to 1923, following which he was hired by Fukuoka University as a professor of French literature. His early career involved translating works such as Anatole France's Le lys rouge and author André Gide's L'Immoraliste into Japanese.

The next year, he resigned from the university due to controversy over his participation in student protest movements. He returned to Tokyo and began a bohemian existence, living out of cheap pensions while translating André Gide's Les Caves du Vatican and Molière's Le Misanthrope and Tartuffe.

== Literary career ==
His literary career began in 1935, when he began writing a series of short stories, starting with Kajin (佳人, Lady), and Hinkyu mondo (貧窮 問答, Dialog on Poverty) in which he depicted the struggles of a solitary writer attempting to create a Parnassian fiction. In 1936 he won the fourth annual Akutagawa Prize for his story Fugen (普賢, The Bodhisattva).

In early 1938, when Japan's war against China was at its height, Ishikawa published the brilliantly ironic Marusu no uta (マルス の 歌, Mars' Song), an antiwar story soon banned for fomenting antimilitary thought. His first novel, Hakubyo (白描, Plain Sketch, 1940) was a criticism of Stalinism. During the war years, he turned his attention to non-fiction, producing biographies on Mori Ōgai and Watanabe Kazan. However, his main interest was in the comic verses of the Tenmei era of the Edo period (狂歌, Kyoka), of which he became a master. He wrote poetry using the pen-name of Isai (夷斎). Along with the likes of Osamu Dazai, Sakaguchi Ango, and Oda Sakunosuke, Ishikawa was known as a member of the Buraiha (literally "Ruffian") tradition of anti-conventional literature. In the post-war period, he wrote Ogon Densetsu (黄金 伝説, Legend of Gold, 1946) and Yakeato no Iesu (焼跡 の イエス, Jesus in the Ashes, 1946). The author Abe Kobo became his pupil.

He also continued his work in essays, which took two forms. In Isai hitsudan (夷斎 筆談, Isai's Discourses, 1950–1951), he covered a wide range of topics in art, literature and current events, in an irreverent, and at times, bitter, style. On the other hand, Shokoku Kijinden (諸国 畸人伝, Eccentrics and Gallants from around the country, 1955–1957), is a series of biographical sketches of unusual persons from various points in Japanese history. He turned also to ancient Japanese history, with the serial publication of Shinshaku Kojiki (新釈 古事記, Another Translation of the Kojiki), Hachiman Engi (八幡 縁起, Origins of Gods of Hachiman, 1957) and Shura (修羅, Demons, 1958), in which he explored the origin of Japanese nation and conflict between the Jōmon and Yayoi peoples.

In 1964 he went to a journey to the Soviet Union and western Europe together with Abe Kobo. It was his first overseas travel, and resulted in Seiyu Nichiroku (西游 日録, A Record of a Journey West, 1965). In 1967 he joined Kawabata Yasunari, Mishima Yukio and Abe Kōbō in issuing a statement protesting the destruction of Chinese art during the Chinese Cultural Revolution. Ishikawa was immensely popular in the post-war era, and won numerous awards. His Edo Bungaku Shoki (江戸 文学 掌記, A Brief Survey of Edo Literature, 1980), won the Yomiuri Literary Award.

He died of lung cancer while working on his last novel, Hebi no Uta (蛇 の 歌, A Song of Snakes, 1988),

=== In English ===
- Ishikawa, Jun. The Legend of Gold and Other Stories. Trans. William J. Tyler. Honolulu: University of Hawai'i Press, 1988. ISBN 0824820703
- Ishikawa, Jun. The Bodhisattva. Columbia University Press (1990). Trans. William J. Tyler. ISBN 0231069626

== See also ==
- Japanese literature
- List of Japanese writers
