= Asagiri =

Asagiri may refer to:

- Asagiri, Kumamoto, a town in Japan
- Japanese destroyer Asagiri, several ships
- Asagiri-class destroyer
- Asagiri (train), a Japanese limited express train
- 10157 Asagiri, an asteroid

== People with the surname ==
- Yū Asagiri (あさぎり夕 or 朝霧夕, 1956-2018), Japanese manga artist
- 朝霧カフカ (あさぎりカフカ or 朝霧カフカ, 1984), Japanese manga artist and novelist

== Fictional characters ==
- Priscilla S. Asagiri, a character in the anime series, Bubblegum Crisis
- Reiko Asagiri (朝霧 麗子), a character in the anime series, Gate Keepers
- Shiori Asagiri (朝霧 史織), a character in the anime series, Tamako Market
- Junko Asagiri (朝霧 純子), a character in the manga/anime series, Desert Punk
- Aya Asagiri, a main character from the manga Magical Girl Site
- Gen Asagiri (あさぎり ゲン (浅霧 幻)), a main character from the manga Dr. Stone
