= Bungo Stray Dogs The Movie: Beast =

- Film poster
- Directed by: Koichi Sakamoto
- Written by: Kafka Asagiri
- Based on: Bungo Stray Dogs Beast by Kafka Asagiri
- Starring: Shohei Hashimoto; Yūki Torigoe
- Music by: Taku Iwasaki
- Production company: W Field
- Distributed by: Kadokawa
- Release date: January 7, 2022
- Running time: 134 minutes
- Country: Japan
- Language: Japanese

Bungo Stray Dogs The Movie: Beast is a 2022 Japanese supernatural action film directed by Koichi Sakamoto and written by Kafka Asagiri. Based on a light novel spin-off from the Bungo Stray Dogs manga by Asagiri, the film is set in an alternate universe from the franchise.

== Premise ==
The story follows Ryunosuke Akutagawa, a man who vows revenge on a man dressed in black in order to rescue his sister. However, as he is about to starve to death, a man from the Armed Detective Agency appears.

== Cast ==
- Shohei Hashimoto as Ryunosuke Akutagawa
- Yūki Torigoe as Atsushi Nakajima
- Masashi Taniguchi as Sakunosuke Oda
- Teruma as Doppo Kunikida
- Ryōki Nagae as Ranpo Edogawa
- Kōsuke Kuwano as Junichirō Tanizaki
- Hitoshi Horinouchi as Kenji Miyazawa
- Ao Hirokawa as Akiko Yosano
- Akari Saitō as Naomi Tanizaki
- Rui Tabuchi as Osamu Dazai
- Sakina Kuwae as Kyōka Izumi
- Ayaka Konno as Gin
- Keisuke Ueda as Chūya Nakahara
- Mitsu Murata as Tatsuhiko Shibusawa
- Yūta Kishimoto as Fyodor D.
- Keisuke Minami as the orphanage director
- Hirofumi Araki as Ango Sakaguchi

== Production ==
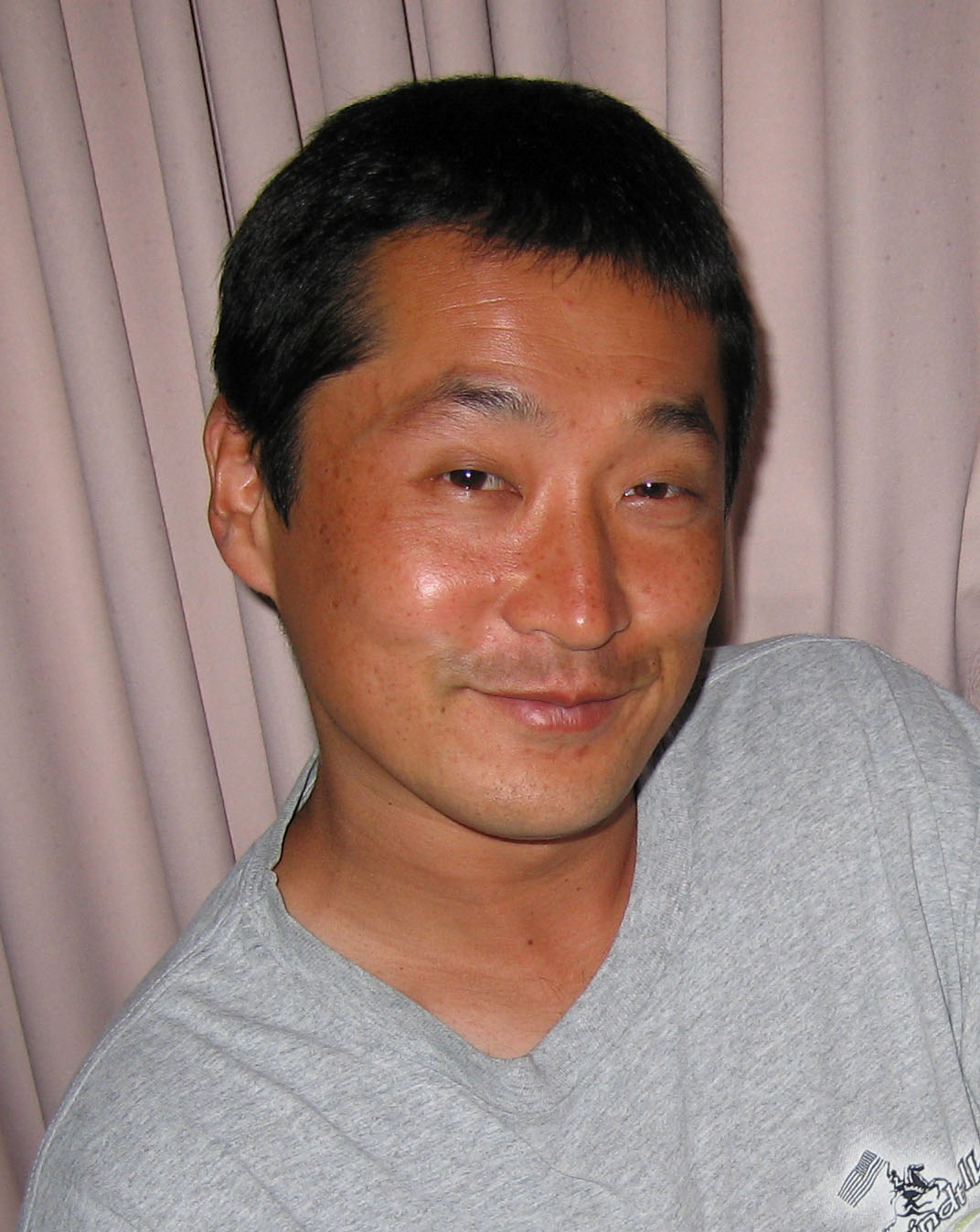
Director Koichi Sakamoto

A live-action film, Beast was confirmed in March 2020 to be in development. It is based on a light novel of the same name by Kafka Asagiri, who also acted as writer, while Koichi Sakamoto directed the movie. Actors Yūki Torigoe (Atsushi Nakajima) and Shohei Hashimoto (Ryunosuke Akutagawa) reprised their roles from the original plays, while almost all of the cast remains the same. Several actors have commented the film will have a different style from plays.

Taku Iwasaki is returning from the anime version to compose the live-action film's music, and the rock unit Granrodeo is also returning to contribute the theme song "Tokei-mawari no Torque" (Clockwise Torque). Iwasaki claimed he conceived a specific type of soundtrack to fit the live-action version of Bungo Stray Dogs which would stand out in contrast to the anime soundtrack. Granrodeo "tried to express the contrast between justice and evil in the music".

In charge of the script, Kafka Asagiri provided new content not present in the original Beast light novel, including more characters.
