= Laurent Bateau =

French actor

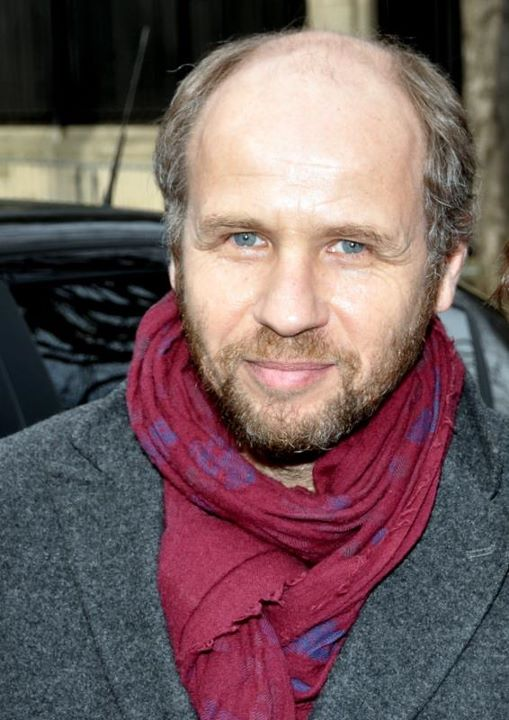
- Laurent Bateau in 2012
- Occupation: Actor
- Years active: 1991–present

Laurent Bateau is a French actor. He has appeared in more than eighty films since 1992.

== Career ==
He started his career in theater in 1991, with a role in Richard II by William Shakespeare, directed by Yves Gasc.

He first appeared in cinema in 1996, in the movie Captain Conan, directed by Bertrand Tavernier.

== Theater ==
Year	Title	Author	Director
1991	Richard II	William Shakespeare	Yves Gasc
1996	Le Roman de Lulu	David Decca	Didier Long
1998	The Widow's Blind Date	Israel Horovitz	Pierre-Olivier Mornas
2021-24	Chers parents	Armelle & Emmanuel Patron	Armelle Patron & Anne Dupagne

== Filmography ==
Year	Title	Role	Director	Notes
1991	Cas de divorce	Thierry Laumier	Alain Lombardi	TV series (1 episode)
1992-94	Goal	Olivier Reignier	Christiane Lehérissey, Rinaldo Bassi, ...	TV series (7 episodes)
1995	Extrême limite	The doctor	Jean-Louis Daniel	TV series (1 episode)
1996	Captain Conan	Perrin	Bertrand Tavernier	
1998	Avocats & associés	Etienne Bouchon	Philippe Triboit	TV series (1 episode)
1998	Madame la proviseur	Denis Labbé	Philippe Triboit	TV series (2 episodes)
1999	One 4 All		Claude Lelouch	
1999	Un cadeau, la vie!	Paul Lesage	Jacob Berger	TV movie
1999	Vertiges	Bertrand / Frédéric	Patrick Malakian & Jérôme Boivin	TV series (2 episodes)
2000	Taking Wing	Man at casting	Steve Suissa	
2000	Mary Lester	Damien	Philomène Esposito	TV series (1 episode)
2001	Mortel Transfert	Young depressive	Jean-Jacques Beineix	
2001	My Wife Is an Actress	Vincent	Yvan Attal	
2001	Belphegor, Phantom of the Louvre	Louvre warden	Jean-Paul Salomé	
2001	Nouvelle de la tour L	The cop	Samuel Benchetrit	Short
2001	Fred et son orchestre	Michel Baussay	Michaëla Watteaux	TV series (1 episode)
2002	Le vigile		Frédéric Pelle	Short
2002	Amant de mes rêves	Bertrand	Christian François	TV movie
2002	Vertiges	Bennardi	Steve Suissa	TV series (1 episode)
2003	I'm Staying!	Bansart	Diane Kurys	
2003	Elle est des nôtres	Promocash employee	Siegrid Alnoy	
2003	Comme si de rien n'était	Serge	Pierre-Olivier Mornas	
2003	Mais qui a tué Pamela Rose?	Captain Mulan	Éric Lartigau	
2003	Le train de 16h19	J.B.	Philippe Triboit	TV movie
2003	Je hais les enfants!	Marc	Lorenzo Gabriele	TV movie
2003	Les enfants du miracle	Patrick Lantier	Sébastien Grall	TV movie
2003	Jean Moulin, une affaire française	Man with glasses	Pierre Aknine	TV movie
2003	Le grand patron	Jean-Claude Ballard	Emmanuel Gust	TV series (1 episode)
2003	Fred et son orchestre	Michel Baussay	Michaëla Watteaux	TV series (1 episode)
2004	Le grand rôle	Elie Weill	Steve Suissa	
2004	Tout le plaisir est pour moi	Thomas	Isabelle Broué	
2004	L'aîné de mes soucis	The father	Carine Tardieu	Short
2004	La crim'	Marquet	Dominique Guillo	TV series (1 episode)
2005	Edy	The Horn	Stéphan Guérin-Tillié	
2005	Cavalcade	Darius	Steve Suissa	
2005	Le plus beau jour de ma vie	Bertrand	Julie Lipinski	
2005	Le personnage	Vladimir Solinbergh	Frédérick Vin	Short
2005	Bel ami	Forestier	Philippe Triboit	TV movie
2005	Jeff et Léo, flics et jumeaux	Luc Vanier	Olivier Guignard	TV series (1 episode)
2005	Trois femmes flics	Leroy	Philippe Triboit	TV series (6 episodes)
2006	OSS 117: Cairo, Nest of Spies	Nigel Gardenborough	Michel Hazanavicius	
2006	Chambre 616		Frédéric Pelle	Short
2006	Passés troubles	Talmond	Serge Meynard	TV movie
2006	Je t'aime à te tuer	Nicolas	Alain Wermus	TV movie
2006	Au secours, les enfants reviennent!	Alain Leroy	Thierry Binisti	TV movie
2006	Le tuteur	Max	Édouard Molinaro	TV series (1 episode)
2007	Danse avec lui	The man at the bar	Valérie Guignabodet	
2007	Porte-à-porte		Jean-Pascal Gautier	Short
2007	Mariage surprise	Isham	Arnaud Sélignac	TV movie
2007	Les jurés	Pierre	Bertrand Arthuys	TV mini-series
2008	Ça se soigne?	Doctor Goeborg	Laurent Chouchan	
2008	Coluche: l'histoire d'un mec	Jean-Paul	Antoine de Caunes	
2008	Une lumière dans la nuit	Brother Marie-Thomas	Olivier Guignard	TV movie
2008	Le silence de l'épervier	Julien Lefort	Dominique Ladoge	TV mini-series
2008	Cellule identité	Pierre Garnier	Stéphane Kappes	TV series (1 episode)
2009	Mensch	Vincent	Steve Suissa	
2009	Le Concert	Bertrand	Radu Mihăileanu	
2009	Beauties at War	Jean-René Pouchard	Patrice Leconte	
2009	Une affaire d'état	Pascal Chardon	Eric Valette	
2009	All About Actresses	The doctor	Maïwenn	
2009	LOL (Laughing Out Loud)	Romain	Lisa Azuelos	
2009	L'évasion	Georges	Laurence Katrian	TV movie
2009	Des gens qui passent	Guelin	Alain Nahum	TV movie
2009	Vive les vacances!	Patrick	Stéphane Kappes	TV series (1 episode)
2009	Enquêtes réservées	Grégory Neuville	Bruno Garcia	TV series (1 episode)
2010	Le mac	Rafart	Pascal Bourdiaux	
2010	Hereafter	TV Producer	Clint Eastwood	
2010	There Is a War	Simon	Olivier Laneurie	Short
2010	La vénitienne	Froment	Saara Saarela	TV movie
2010	Un divorce de chien!	Bernard	Lorraine Lévy	TV movie
2010	Histoires de vies	Charles	Jean-Marc Rudnicki	TV series (1 episode)
2010	Marion Mazzano	Roland Masse	Marc Angelo	TV series (6 episodes)
2010-12	Un village français	Albert Crémieux	Philippe Triboit & Jean-Marc Brondolo	TV series (18 episodes)
2011	Polisse	Hervé	Maïwenn	
2011	Violence elle seule	The teacher	Éric Capitaine	Short
2011	1, 2, 3, voleurs	Captain Leduc	Gilles Mimouni	TV movie
2011	La vie en miettes	Blandin	Denis Malleval	TV movie
2011	Mort d'un président	Michel Jobert	Pierre Aknine	TV movie
2011	À dix minutes de nulle part	The neighbor	Arnauld Mercadier	TV movie
2012	Radiostars	Frédérico	Romain Lévy	
2012	Des soucis et des hommes	Stéphane	Christophe Barraud	TV series (8 episodes)
2013	Win Win	Christian Fleury	Claudio Tonetti	
2013	Je ne suis pas mort	Eugène	Mehdi Ben Attia	
2013	15 jours ailleurs	Guillaume	Didier Bivel	TV movie
2013	Ce monde est fou	Alain Damier-Bechard	Badreddine Mokrani	TV movie
2013	Kanak, l'histoire oubliée	M. Peyrac	Stéphane Kappes	TV movie
2014	Fiston	Benoît Legrand	Pascal Bourdiaux	
2014	Palais de justesse	The bailiff	Stéphane De Groodt	Short
2014	Attends moi j'arrive	The father	Pierre Glémet	Short
2014	Marie Curie, une femme sur le front	Claudius Regaud	Alain Brunard	TV movie
2014	Détectives	Sébastien Peltier	Renaud Bertrand	TV series (1 episode)
2014	Candice Renoir	Olivier Laneurie	Vincent Fontanel	TV series (1 episode)
2014	Crimes et botanique	Frédéric	Lorenzo Gabriele	TV series (1 episode)
2015	The Sense of Wonder	Paul	Éric Besnard	
2015	Des roses en hiver	Renato	Lorenzo Gabriele	TV movie
2015	Le mystère du lac	Nicolas Mazaud	Jérôme Cornuau	TV mini-series
2015	The Disappearance	Jean Morel	Charlotte Brändström	TV mini-series
2015	Mongeville	Martin Marsac	Bruno Garcia	TV series (1 episode)
2015	Peplum	Medici 1	Philippe Lefebvre	TV series (4 episodes)
2016	Tout Schuss	Yann	Stéphan Archinard & François Prévôt-Leygonie	
2016	Les naufragés	Karl	David Charhon	
2016	Super Lola	Laurent Fazière	Régis Musset	TV movie
2016	Crime à Martigues	Dr. Philippe Edmond	Claude-Michel Rome	TV movie
2016	The Bureau	Spiesser	Éric Rochant & Antoine Chevrollier	TV series (1 episode)
2016-17	Les grands	Humbert	Vianney Lebasque	TV series (9 episodes)
2017	Dalida	The psy	Lisa Azuelos	
2017	Mes trésors	The notary	Pascal Bourdiaux	
2017	Sales gosses	Alex's father	Frédéric Quiring	
2017	Boule & Bill 2	Sausage	Pascal Bourdiaux	
2017	Void and Method	Bruno	Remy Bazerque	Short
2017	Holly Weed	The monk	Laurent de Vismes	TV series (12 episodes)
2018	Blockbuster	Lola's father	July Hygreck	
2018	Moi et le Che	Ingrid's lover	Patrice Gautier	
2018	Rolling to You	Lucien	Franck Dubosc	
2018	At Eternity's Gate	Joseph Roulin	Julian Schnabel	
2018	La belle et la belle	Jérôme	Sophie Fillières	
2018	Return of the Hero	Monsieur Dunoyer	Laurent Tirard	
2018	The Romanoffs	Denis	Matthew Weiner	TV series (1 episode)
2018	Commissaire Magellan	Jérôme Vouvray	Stéphane Franchet	TV series (1 episode)
2018-19	Philharmonia	Léopold Saint-Just	Louis Choquette	TV series (6 episodes)
2019	100 kilos d'étoiles	The doctor	Marie-Sophie Chambon	
2019	Toute ressemblance	Yvon Kepler	Michel Denisot	
2019	Mais vous êtes fous	The expert	Audrey Diwan	
2019	Alice	Jacques	Juliette Rose	Short
2019	Les empêchés	Voice	Sandrine Terragno & Stéphanie Vasseur	Short
2019	Une vie après	Lucas	Jean-Marc Brondolo	TV movie
2019	Alexandra Ehle	Olivier Girardon	Nicolas Guicheteau	TV series (1 episode)
2020	Le prince oublié	The penguin	Michel Hazanavicius	
2020	Les blagues de Toto	Fabrice	Pascal Bourdiaux	
2020	10 jours sans maman	Didier Richaud	Ludovic Bernard	
2020	Faux-semblants	Jacques Miller	Akim Isker	TV movie
2020	Mention particulière	Patrick	Cyril Gelblat	TV movie
2020	Le canal des secrets	Etienne Richomme	Julien Zidi	TV movie
2020	Mirage	Eric	Louis Choquette	TV series (1 episode)
2020	La Flamme	Daniel	Jonathan Cohen & Jérémie Galan	TV series (1 episode)
2021	Delicious	Dumortier	Éric Besnard	
2021	The Speech	The doctor	Laurent Tirard	
2021	Intraitable	Maître Boisseau	Marion Laine	TV movie
2021	Emma Bovary	Lheureux	Didier Bivel	TV movie
2021	Face à Face	Laurent Lartigue	July Hygreck	TV series (1 episode)
2021	Léo Matteï, brigade des mineurs	Claude Monnier	Hervé Renoh	TV series (2 episodes)
2022	King	Martin	David Moreau	
2022	C'est magnifique!	Marc	Clovis Cornillac	
2022	Temps de chien	Benoit	Vanessa Caffin	Short
2022	Inédit en Europe		Théo Nourdin	Short
2022	Boomerang	Renaud Monteil	Christian François	TV movie
2022	L'art du crime	Édouard Manet	Christelle Raynal	TV series (1 episode)
2022	Détox	Bernard	Marie Jardillier	TV series (6 episodes)
2023	Les têtes givrées	Pascal Paulin	Stéphane Cazes	
2023	Les blagues de Toto 2 - Classe verte	Fabrice	Pascal Bourdiaux	
2023	Flair de famille	Jacques Vandamme	Didier Bivel	TV movie
2023	La belle étincelle	Serge	Hervé Mimran	TV movie
TBA	La vie devant moi		Nils Tavernier	Post-Production
TBA	Jamais sans mon psy		Arnaud Lemort	Post-Production
TBA	Fotos		Arnaud Rivaille	Short; Post-Production
TBA	La Fulgurée	David Dorval	Didier Bivel	TV movie Post-Production
