= Hidemitsu =

- Gender: Male

Origin
- Origin: Japanese
- Meaning: Different meanings depending on the kanji used

Hidemitsu (written: 秀満 or 英光) is a masculine Japanese given name. Notable people with the name include:

- Akechi Hidemitsu (明智 秀満; 1536–1582), Japanese samurai
- Hidemitsu Nakano (中野 英光; 1890–1982), Japanese general
- Hidemitsu Tanaka (田中 英光; 1913—1949), Japanese writer
