= Rui Tabuchi =

Japanese actor and former idol (born 1995)

- 田淵 累生
- Born: September 12, 1995 (age 30); Ishikawa Prefecture, Japan
- Education: Chuo University
- Occupations: Actor, Idol
- Years active: 2018–present
- Agent: Voyz Entertainment (2019–2021); Freelancer (2021–present)
- Height: 180 cm (5 ft 11 in)
- Website: ruitabuchi-officialsite.com

Rui Tabuchi (田淵 累生, Tabuchi Rui; born September 12, 1995 in Ishikawa Prefecture, Japan) is a Japanese actor. He was previously affiliated with VOYZ ENTERTAINMENT and is now working as a freelance actor. He is a former member of the idol groups High School Children and VOYZ BOY.

He is known for his role as Dazai Osamu in the Bungō Stray Dogs Stage and Izuminokami Kanesada in the Touken Ranbu Stage productions.

== Biography ==
=== Early life and education ===
Tabuchi was born in Ishikawa Prefecture, Japan. He participated in competitive basketball during his elementary and junior high school years, competing in national-level tournaments. After completing his secondary education, he moved to Tokyo to attend university.

=== Early career ===
In 2016, during his time at university, he took part in a campus beauty contest, Mr & Miss Chuo 2016, and was awarded the Grand Prix title. He later competed in the national-level Mr of Mr 2017 contest, where he placed second. These competitions led to further opportunities in modeling and entertainment.

In 2018, he participated in the audition program Kimimote Lodge, produced by Yasushi Akimoto. After winning the audition, he debuted as a member of High School Children on October 5, 2018, alongside Hiroki Ishibashi, Keito Takahashi, Rikiya Tomizono, and Tomoya Fukui.

In 2019, Tabuchi began working as a stage actor, appearing in the stage play Kamen Rider Zangetsu – Gaim Gaiden. In May of the same year, he joined VOYZ ENTERTAINMENT, and became a member of VOYZ BOY, a male idol group affiliated with the agency.

=== Freelance work ===
On November 30, 2021, Tabuchi announced his graduation from VOYZ ENTERTAINMENT. With his departure, he graduated from VOYZ BOY, and High School Children subsequently disbanded. As of 2022, he has continued his career as a freelance actor, appearing mainly in stage productions.

== Filmography ==
=== Theatre ===
Year	Title	Role	Notes
2019	Kamen Rider Zangetsu Stage -Gaim Gaiden-	Ose	
2019	Rock Opera 'R&J'	Mercutio	
2019	Stage: Touken Ranbu – Iden: Oboro no Shishitachi	Izuminokami Kanesada	
2020	Reading Drama Aki no Owari no Rīdingu Bungaku	Ryunosuke Akagawa	
2021	Yowamushi Pedal SPARE BIKE Heroes!!	Yusuke Makishima	
2021	Bungou Stray Dogs: DEAD APPLE	Dazai Osamu	
2021	Bungou Stray Dogs: Dazai, Chuuya, Fifteen Years Old	Dazai Osamu	
2021	Praeter no Kizu	Jin Karasue	
2022	Shakunetsu Kabaddi	Tatsuya Yoigoshi	
2022	Mujintō ni Ikiru Jū Roku-nin	Chichijima Kereppu	
2022	Bungou Stray Dogs: STORM BRINGER	Dazai Osamu	
2022	Amafuru Shōgo, Kaze Fukeba	Heiji Nagai	
2022	MEIJIZA 150th Anniversary Special Concert The Dream Co-Star	Himself	
2022	Anata o Shiawase ni Suru Sekai no Densetsu Shirīzu Jevoudan no Kaibutsu	Darwin	
2022	Musical Wind Boys!	Toki Mukai	
2023	Jigokuraku	Yamada Asaemon Toma	
2023	Nobunaga Miman – Tensei Mitsuhide ga Taosenai	Ieyasu	
2023	Bungou Stray Dogs: Cannibalism	Dazai Osamu	
2023	Touken Ranbu 7th Anniversary Kanshasa Yumegatari Touenkai	Izuminokami Kanesada	
2023	MEIJIZA 150th Anniversary Stage Akahige	Takezo	
2023	Musical Reading The Little Match Girl	Mikkel	
2024	Jigokuraku: Final Chapter	Yamada Asaemon Toma	
2024	Touken Ranbu Shiden – Tsuketari Kitan no Sōmatō	Izuminokami Kanesada	
2024	Salaryman's Club	Mikoto Shiratori	
2024	Uzume's 12th Production Ano Haru wa, Itsu Made mo Aoi	Haruto Sakurai	
2024	Nouzei Gassen	Shinkai	
2025	Ride Kamens: The Stage	Narushi Kamui	

=== Film ===
Year	Title	Role	Notes
2022	Bungo Stray Dogs The Movie: Beast	Dazai Osamu	
2023	Eiga Touken Ranbu 2	Izuminokami Kanesada	
2023	Urufu Hantā ga Iku! Jirō Sangokushi Hen	Cao Zhen	
2024	Ifūdōdō Shōgakukin tte Iikata Yamete Moraemasen ka?	Sota Mizue	
2025	Kamen Rider Gavv: Guilty Parfait	Garuna	

=== Television ===
Year	Title	Role	Network	Notes
2018–2020	Baguette	Himself	NTV	
2019	High&Low The Worst	Cameo		
2020	DASADA	Cameo	NTV	
2023	Nobunaga Miman – Tensei Mitsuhide ga Taosenai	Ieyasu		
2023	Super no Kago no Nakami ga Ki ni Naru Watashi	Cameo		
