= Bungo Stray Dogs =

Japanese media series beginning in 2012

- First tankōbon volume cover, featuring (left to right), Doppo Kunikida, Ranpo Edogawa, Atsushi Nakajima, Kenji Miyazawa, Osamu Dazai, and Akiko Yosano

文豪ストレイドッグス (Bungō Sutorei Doggusu)
- Genre: Action, mystery, supernatural
- Manga
- Written by: Kafka Asagiri
- Illustrated by: Sango Harukawa
- Published by: Kadokawa Shoten
- English publisher: NA: Yen Press
- Imprint: Kadokawa Comics A
- Magazine: Young Ace
- Original run: 4 December 2012 – present
- Volumes: 28
Further information
Light novel
Written by	Kafka Asagiri
Illustrated by	Sango Harukawa
Published by	Kadokawa Shoten
English publisher	NA: Yen Press
Imprint	Kadokawa Beans Bunko
Original run	1 April 2014 – present
Volumes	10
Manga
Bungo Stray Dogs: Wan!
Written by	Neco Kanai
Published by	Kadokawa Shoten
English publisher	NA: Yen Press
Magazine	Young Ace Up
Original run	22 December 2015 – present
Volumes	14
Anime television series
Directed by	Takuya Igarashi
Produced by	Chiaki Kurakane; Junichirō Tamura (#1–36); Mari Suzuki (#37–)
Written by	Yōji Enokido
Music by	Taku Iwasaki
Studio	Bones
Licensed by	Crunchyroll; UK: Anime Limited (cancelled)
Original network	Tokyo MX, TVA, KBS, TVS, CTC, tvk, GBS, MTV, SUN, TVQ, BS11, Wowow
English network	SEA: Aniplus Asia
Original run	7 April 2016 – 20 September 2023
Episodes	61 (Note: The anime's lone OVA is formally considered the 25th episode of the series in its home media release, and is thus included in the total count.)
Manga
Bungo Stray Dogs: Dead Apple
Written by	Bungo Stray Dogs DA Production Committee
Illustrated by	Ganjii
Published by	Kadokawa Shoten
English publisher	NA: Yen Press
Magazine	Young Ace Up
Original run	9 March 2018 – 29 June 2023
Volumes	4
Manga
Bungo Stray Dogs: Beast
Written by	Kafka Asagiri
Illustrated by	Shiwasu Hoshikawa
Published by	Kadokawa Shoten
English publisher	NA: Yen Press
Magazine	Monthly Shōnen Ace
Original run	26 December 2019 – 26 January 2022
Volumes	4
Anime television series
Bungo Stray Dogs Wan!
Directed by	Satonobu Kikuchi
Written by	Kazuyuki Fudeyasu
Music by	Taku Iwasaki
Studio	Bones; Nomad
Licensed by	Crunchyroll
Original network	Tokyo MX, BS11, MBS, Wowow
Original run	13 January 2021 – 17 September 2026
Episodes	24
Manga
Bungo Stray Dogs: Dazai, Chuuya, Age Fifteen
Written by	Kafka Asagiri
Illustrated by	Shiwasu Hoshikawa
Published by	Kadokawa Shoten
English publisher	NA: Yen Press
Magazine	Monthly Shōnen Ace
Original run	26 July 2022 – 26 August 2024
Volumes	4
Manga
Bungo Stray Dogs: Storm Bringer
Written by	Kafka Asagiri
Illustrated by	Shiwasu Hoshikawa
Published by	Kadokawa Shoten
English publisher	NA: Yen Press
Magazine	Monthly Shōnen Ace
Original run	24 January 2025 – present
Volumes	2
Manga
Bungo Stray Dogs: The Untold Origins of the Detective Agency
Written by	Kafka Asagiri
Illustrated by	Tomori Adachi
Published by	Kadokawa Shoten
English publisher	NA: Yen Press
Magazine	Young Ace
Original run	4 March 2025 – present
Volumes	3
Manga
Bungo Stray Dogs: Dazai o Hirotta Hi
Written by	Kafka Asagiri
Illustrated by	Shikiji Sorakura
Published by	Kadokawa Shoten
Magazine	Young Ace
Original run	3 July 2026 – present
Films
Bungo Stray Dogs: Dead Apple (2018 anime film); Bungo Stray Dogs The Movie: Beast (2022 live-action film)
- icon

Bungo Stray Dogs (Japanese: 文豪ストレイドッグス, Hepburn: Bungō Sutorei Doggusu; lit. 'Literary Stray Dogs'), also abbreviated as BSD, is a Japanese manga series written by Kafka Asagiri and illustrated by Sango Harukawa, which has been serialized in Kadokawa Shoten's seinen manga magazine Young Ace since 2012. Each character is named after influential authors and writers of the late 19th century to early 20th century and their powers are based on said author's books. The series follows the members of the Armed Detective Agency as they try to protect Yokohama from organizations such as the Port Mafia. The story mainly focuses on the weretiger Atsushi Nakajima, who joins others gifted with supernatural powers to accomplish different tasks including solving mysteries and carrying out missions assigned by the agency.

The manga originated from Asagiri's desire to write famous literary artists as fighters including the famous Osamu Dazai, having become popular thanks to a Nico Nico Douga video. In writing the cast, Asagiri decided to focus on weak characters, deeming Atsushi as a weak hero who needs to be helped by his wise mentor, Dazai. The author read multiple novels in the making of the series to feature as many writers as possible. Meanwhile, Dazai's character was mostly explored in light novels he wrote.

The series inspired a spin-off manga, Bungou Stray Dogs Wan!, as well as multiple light novels, an anime television series adaptation produced by Bones, an anime film, Bungou Stray Dogs: Dead Apple, a spin-off television series adaptation of Bungo Stray Dogs Wan! and a live-action film, Bungou Stray Dogs The Movie: Beast. The manga was a commercial success with 16 million copies in print. Though the manga was critically successful based on the multiple cast presented and the artwork, Atsushi's characterization was often noted to be overshadowed by the supporting cast as the lead's trauma is constantly brought back across the narrative.

== Plot ==
After being kicked out of his orphanage, the young Atsushi Nakajima saves a detective named Osamu Dazai, believing he was drowning in the river while his actual intention was suicide. From Dazai, Atsushi learns he is a gifted with a supernatural ability capable of transforming him into a berserker white tiger. Dazai recruits him into the Agency he works for, the Armed Detective Agency, that handles crimes too dangerous for the police to handle. There, he meets many other ability users as they tackle various cases and events taking place in the city of Yokohama, a place teeming with individuals with Supernatural Abilities. Atsushi becomes the target of Dazai's former pupil Ryūnosuke Akutagawa, who is a member of the criminal organization run by Ōgai Mori known as the Port Mafia. Atsushi also rescues the young mafia member Kyōka Izumi upon learning she is being forced to kill. During Atsushi's fights against the mafia, he also meets Francis Scott Key Fitzgerald, the leader of an organisation named The Guild who placed the bounty on his head. Fitzgerald reveals there is a supernatural book (referred to as The Book) capable of changing reality linked with Atsushi, hence putting a bounty on the black market. Fitzgerald disregards any superficial damage the Guild might bring to Yokohama in exchange for the book, having an airship named "Moby Dick" destroy the city. However, he is nearly killed by Atsushi and Akutagawa once they join forces while Kyōka stops Moby Dick. Kyōka then joins the Agency.

A Russian man, known as Fyodor Dostoevsky sets up a fatal clash between the detectives and the mafia using a virus ability user from the group that he leads, Rats in the House of the Dead. Natsume Sōseki, who is the creator of the collaborative Tripartite Framework, stops the fight. While Atsushi and Akutagawa corner the virus' originator, Dazai manages to arrest Dostoevsky. Pages of The Book that were used by the government for experiments are stolen by Dostoevsky's other group, the terrorist association of five people, called the Decay of the Angel, which uses The Book's powers to frame the Detective Agency for a murder case, during which one of the members of the Decay of the Angel, Nikolai Gogol, murders several politicians then himself too. Dazai is imprisoned for his past crimes and is placed in a cell near Dostoevsky while the government sends its military forces known as the Hunting Dogs to execute the members of the Agency. As the Agency faces defeat, they form an alliance with Fitzgerald and later the mafia. Across the multiple fights, it is revealed there is another person above Dostoevsky, the leader of the Decay of Angels is Ōchi Fukuchi, the leader of the Hunting Dogs and Japan's national war hero.

After facing off both Atsushi and Akutagawa in a fight which ended in Atsushi escaping and Fukuchi killing Akutagawa, Fukuchi brings forward the Decay of the Angel's trump card, the vampiric Ability User Bram Stoker, whose limbs were cut off and his powers were sealed by Fukuchi to incapacitate him, and Fukuchi has him to use his Ability to transform Akutagawa and many others into vampire soldiers to conduct a global terror attack. Meanwhile, Gogol, who is revealed to have survived, teams up with the last member of the Decay of the Angel, the manager of the world's greatest neutral territory, the Sky Casino, a man named Sigma. Together they reach Meursault, the high-security prison where Dazai and Dostoevsky are kept, and Gogol has them compete in a deadly game to escape Meursault in 30 minutes, with Dazai enlisting Sigma's help while Fyodor teams up with the vampirized Port Mafia executive Chuuya, who is Dazai's ex-partner.

Back in Yokohama, using the vampire infection he created as an excuse, Fukuchi convinces the U.N. to release the Ability based doomsday weapon One Order, that gives him complete control of anyone belonging under his jurisdiction, which happens to be all of the world's military thanks to Fukuchi's fame and subsequent influence. The Agency catches wind of this plan, and they infiltrate the airport where the One Order is supposed to be delivered, with the other Hunting Dogs hot on their tails. Although the Agency's director, Yukichi Fukuzawa manages to defeat Fukuchi, Dostoevsky arrives by tricking one of Bram's vampires into killing him, which activates his Ability, that lets him take over the body of anyone who kills him, thus killing Bram and escaping Dazai. Then, he uses Fukuchi, as well as two Ability-based weapons, the Sword of the Silver Cross Soluz Levni, and the space-time blade Shintō Amenogozen to create a three-pronged singularity being by the name of Ame-no-Gozen, which Fyodor can control thanks to the Soluz Levni.

After Ame-no-Gozen defeats and seemingly kills many of the Agency members, including Atsushi, the latter ends up in a fourth-dimensional space where he meets the swordsmith Akinari Ueda, the creator of Shintō Amenogozen, who was sealed there, since the blades created with his Ability would lose their power had he died. Atsushi manages to return to the outside world with the Agency members and Akinari in tow, who separates Fukuchi from Amenogozen, thus foiling Dosotevsky's plan. Atsushi and Akutagawa manage to corner Dostoevsky, preventing his escape just by a hair multiple times. In the end, Fukuchi beheads Dostoevsky, and subsequently kills himself to prevent the latter taking over his body.

A few days later, Atsushi is aiding with cleaning up the ruins of the airport, when he stumbles upon a part of the Book's page, on which a message inscribed by Dostoevsky transports him to the 18th century London.

== Development ==
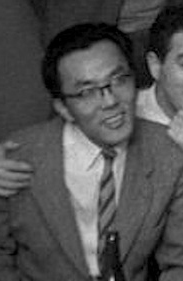
Author Shūsaku Endō (pictured in 1954) was a major influence to Asagiri in order to use writers as fighters in the manga.

After quitting his job as a salaryman, Kafka Asagiri became popular through his video "Yukkuri Youmu and the Really Scary Cthulhu Mythos" released on Nico Nico Douga. The first episode was viewed about 1 million times, much to Asagiri's surprise. Four months after he uploaded the video, Asagiri was approached by the editor-in-chief of Monthly Shonen Ace to bring in three projects in two weeks. The Editorial department has also contacted him.

The manga originated from Asagiri's idea to gather multiple famous late authors and poets and draw them as young adults and teenagers with supernatural powers. He was inspired by Shūsaku Endō's story Ryūgaku. In particular, Osamu Dazai was used as a major character after reading his book No Longer Human; in the story, Dazai expresses his embarrassment involving his entire life which the author found relatable. Impressed with this work, Asagiri decided to make his own take on Osamu Dazai stand out among the readers. After Dazai, the next writer chosen to make a character that often accompanied Dazai was Atsushi Nakajima, the main character. However, he instead needed a third character who acts as an equal to Dazai. This led to the creation of Kunikida. Although Kunikida was hard to come up with, Asagiri did not have writer's block in general as he claims that writing backgrounds takes him between two or four days. He calls this process "mysterious". Kadokawa Shoten approached Asagiri with writing more content for the characters, which led to the production of light novels where the writer decided to explore Dazai's past.

The white tiger from Nakajima's story is something artist Sango Harukawa always wanted to draw. As the manga was starting, Asagiri wrote about four lines of character settings and send it to Harukawa via email. Then, pointing to Atsushi Nakajima's setting drawing, a setting drawing like this comes up. Asagiri purposely decided to make the main character a person with no personality. That way, it would be easier to connect with the unique characters around the reader. In terms of roles, if Atsushi is the hero, Dazai is the sage. Like the role of Merlin to King Arthur. His design is also meant to heavily contrast Ryunosuke Akutagawa.

Among several supernatural elements seen in the series, Asagiri came up with one that everybody wants under the name "The Book". The magic nature of the book was based on Akira Toriyama's wish-granting items from the manga Dragon Ball. A major theme in the narrative of people overcoming themselves; as an example, Kyōka Izumi was written as an assassin who wants to escape from the work from the Port Mafia and instead becomes Atsushi's partner in the Detective Agency. While Kyōka is unable to leave her past behind, she tries to appeal to the readers with her new way of living which was written to be relatable. Villains are often written to be relatable despite their horrible actions too. Francis Scott Fitzgerald from the Guild plans to destroy Yokohama in his story arc but at the end and his next appearances, it is revealed his only desire was protecting his family. Sigma is also another villain written to be relatable though the author made him like that due to his "average" skills when compared to stronger antagonists. Ranpo Edogawa was one of the hardest characters to write due to his superior intelligence when compared with the rest of the characters but still felt that his role in the story would appeal more to the fans once he became more active. As the series progressed, Asagiri reflected although the story is about the battle between justice and terrorism with the arrival of the Decay of Angels and Hunting Dogs, it was more specific about the side of justice and who is on the enemy side of evil. He wanted the reader to do whatever he wanted to do based on whether he was to be included on either side.

Sango Harukawa provided Asagiri with designs that helped the writer to create the stories easier. Asagiri stated that the designs of Atsushi and Dazai were done to contrast each other although there were some revisions done in the making of the series. The light novels were also written with the idea of having more books released per year. The lives of more writers inspired Asagiri, most notably the friendship of Osamu Dazai, Ango Sakaguchi and Sakunosuke Oda. When it came to Sigma, Asagiri drew his own take on the design but it was instead altered by Harukawa. In 2023, Asagiri expressed satisfaction with the large amount of other works based on his manga and expected there would be more products in the future.

== Media ==
=== Manga ===
Written by Kafka Asagiri and illustrated by Sango Harukawa, Bungo Stray Dogs began publishing the manga in Kadokawa Shoten's seinen manga magazine Young Ace on 4 December 2012. Kadokawa has collected its chapters into individual tankōbon volume. The first volume was released on 4 April 2013. As of 26 March 2026 twenty-eight volumes have been released.

The series has been licensed for North America by Yen Press with the first volume being released on 20 December 2016. The English translation is by Kevin Gifford. As of May 2025, twenty-five volumes have been published.

A manga based on the light novel Bungo Stray Dogs: Beast debuted in Monthly Shōnen Ace on 26 December 2019. This spin-off manga takes place in an alternate timeline and features Ryūnosuke Akutagawa, who joins the Armed Detective Agency, and Atsushi Nakajima as a subordinate of the Port Mafia.

A spin-off manga based on the light novel Bungo Stray Dogs: Dazai, Chūya, Age Fifteen, which centers around Dazai and Chūya's backstories, began serialization in Monthly Shōnen Ace in July 2022.

A manga based on the light novel Bungo Stray Dogs: Storm Bringer began serialization in Monthly Shōnen Ace on 24 January 2025.

A manga based on the companion novel to the Bungo Stray Dogs The Movie: Beast film began serialization in Young Ace on 3 July 2026.

=== Anime ===
An anime television series adaptation produced by Bones was directed by Takuya Igarashi and written by Yōji Enokido. Nobuhiro Arai and Hiroshi Kanno served as the chief animation directors, while the former also served as character designer along with Ryō Hirata. Taku Iwasaki composed the series' music. Kazuhiro Wakabayashi was the series' sound director at Glovision. Additionally, Yumiko Kondou was the art director, Yukari Goto was the anime's color designer, Tsuyoshi Kanbayashi was the director of photography and Shigeru Nishiyama was the editor. Granrodeo performed the anime's opening theme, titled "Trash Candy", and Luck Life performed the anime's ending theme, titled "Namae wo Yobu yo" (名前を呼ぶよ; lit. 'I'll call your name').

The series was split into two halves: the first half, containing twelve episodes, premiered on 7 April 2016 and ended on 23 June 2016, being broadcast on Tokyo MX, Teletama, Chiba TV, tvk, GBS (Gifu Broadcasting), Mie TV, SUN, TVQ Kyushu, and BS11. The second half, also containing twelve episodes, premiered on 6 October 2016 and ended on 22 December 2016. Crunchyroll streamed the series. As for the second half, Screen Mode sung the opening theme titled "Reason Living" while Luck Life once again sung the ending theme titled "Kaze ga Fuku Machi" (風が吹く街; lit. 'The city where the wind blows').

An OVA was bundled with the 13th limited edition manga volume, which was released on 31 August 2017.

On 21 July 2018, it was announced that the series would receive a third season. The cast and staff would reprise their roles from the previous two seasons. The third season premiered from 12 April 2019 and ended on 28 June 2019, being broadcast on Tokyo MX, TVA, KBS, SUN, BS11, and Wowow. Granrodeo performed the third seasons' opening theme "Setsuna no Ai" (セツナの愛; lit. 'A moment's love') and Luck Life performed the third season's ending theme "Lily". Funimation released the simuldub on 17 May 2019.

In June 2020, Kadokawa announced that an anime television series adaptation of the spin-off manga, Bungo Stray Dogs Wan!, was in production. Satonobu Kikuchi directed the series, with Kazuyuki Fudeyasu handling series composition, Hiromi Daimi designing the characters, and Bones and Nomad handling production. The main cast members reprised their roles. The series aired from 13 January to 31 March 2021 on Tokyo MX, BS11, MBS, Wowow.

On 7 November 2021, it was announced that the series would receive a fourth season. The fourth season premiered on 4 January 2023 and ended on 29 March 2023. Screen Mode performed the opening theme "True Story", and Luck Life performed the ending theme "Shirushi" (しるし).

On 29 March 2023, it was announced that the series would receive a fifth season. It premiered on 12 July 2023 and ended on 20 September 2023. The opening theme is "Tetsu no Ori" (鉄の檻; lit. 'Iron Cell') by Granrodeo, while the ending theme is "Kiseki" (軌跡; lit. 'Trails') by Luck Life.

On 1 November 2025, it was announced that Bungo Stray Dogs Wan! would receive a second season, with the staff and cast members reprising their roles. It aired from 2 July to 17 September 2026.

The anime is licensed in North America by Crunchyroll (formerly known as Funimation) with home video distribution.

=== Theatrical films ===
At the Mayo(w)i Inu-tachi no Utage Sono Ni event on 19 February 2017 a film project based on the manga series was announced. Titled Bungo Stray Dogs: Dead Apple, the film premiered on 3 March 2018 with the staff and cast from the anime series returning to reprise their roles.

A live-action film was announced in July 2019. Titled Bungo Stray Dogs The Movie: Beast, the film premiered on 7 January 2022.

=== Video games ===
An action role-playing game titled Bungo Stray Dogs Mayoi Inu Kaikitan was announced and released on iOS and Android. The game includes character side stories that were not found in the anime series as well as new game-exclusive scenarios.

The gameplay involves using pinball machine-like mechanics to defeat enemies, and earning a combination of materials, ability stones, and gold. Materials and gold can be used for powering up and evolving characters, while ability stones are most often used for scouts, to unlock more characters in-game.

However, the game shut down on July 31, 2026, and is now unplayable because the company that developed and operated it closed down.

A second game has been announced, titled Gakuen Bungo Stray Dogs.

=== Stage plays ===
A stage play based on the events in the first season of the anime was realized starting at the KAAT Kanagawa Arts Theatre in Yokohama from December 2017, with the play moving through major cities in Japan. It was also shown at the Morinomiya Piloti Hall in Osaka on 12–13 January, and at AiiA 2.5 Theater Tokyo from 31 January to 4 February. Starting in September 2018, a second stage play was done based on the light novel Dazai Osamu and the Dark Era and its anime adaptation in the second season of the show. It was first shown in Tokyo at the Sunshine Gekijō from 22 September to 8 October and then moved to Osaka where it ran at the Morinomiya Piloti Hall on 13–14 October. A third stage play based on the rest of the second season, thus excluding Dazai's backstory at the beginning of the season, was performed from June to July 2019 in Iwate, Fukuoka, Aichi and Osaka, and in July in Tokyo.

=== Light novels ===
Multiple light novels have been released, each focusing on a character-specific story not seen until then. These often introduce new characters to the series that weren't previously canon.

There are currently ten novels in total (listed below), with only nine having English translations.

Osamu Dazai's Entrance Exam (01.04.2014), Osamu Dazai and the Dark Era (01.08.2014), The Untold Origins of the Detective Agency (01.05.2015), Gaiden: Ayatsuji Yukito VS. Kyōgoku Natsuhiko (30.01.2016), 55 Minutes (01.10.2016), Dead Apple (03.03.2018), Dazai, Chūya, Age Fifteen (01.04.2019), Beast (01.04.2019), Storm Bringer (02.27.2021), The Day I Took In Dazai (28.12.2023)

=== Short stories ===
Kunikida and Katai's magnificent days (25.09.2019)

== Reception ==
=== Manga ===
Bungo Stray Dogs was well received in Japan. The series also appeared in the Da Vinci's magazine poll from Kadokawa Shoten, while the franchise combined sold ¥1,878,804,092 in 2016. By 2018, the series reached 6 million copies. In 2022, the manga reached 10 million copies in print. In 2024, the manga reached 16 million copies in print.

It came in at 11th for the "Nationwide Bookstore Employees' Recommended Comics of 2014". On TV Asahi's Manga Sōsenkyo 2021 poll, in which 150,000 people voted for their top 100 manga series, Bungo Stray Dogs ranked 64th. Author Dan Brown was attracted by the manga when the author created a fictional version of himself to promote the story. Brown stated he was pleased with the result.

Critical reception to the series has been positive. The Fandom Post said ever since its start the series has had potential to be an entertaining manga, citing the characterization of Atsushi and the power he has, later leading to interesting mystery arcs when more characters from multiple parties become involved, such as the reluctant alliance Atsushi and his rival Akutagawa form to defeat another group. The artwork was praised by UK Anime Network for how detailed are fight scenes while also praising the balance between dark and light plot storylines. Nevertheless, he found a common commentary within fans that the series suffers from a slow pace. While liking the Kunikida subplot, Anime News Network criticized the emotional focus on Atsushi's emotional state in the manga as he often grieves about his background, as well as the way he deals with his emotions when his torturer passes away.

J. Laturnas from University of British Columbia noticed that Dazai's characterization in Bungo Stray Dogs and Bungō and Alchemist helped to revitalize the original author's works. "Of course, the character named 'Dazai Osamu' is not the person himself," Asagiri laughs, "the most important thing was to make [the author-characters] interesting in a manga-like way." The Dazai in Bungō Stray Dogs is not a characterification of the author himself but of the author's star text: an abstract representation of "Dazai" and his literature in popular imagination. Likewise, Dazai's character is heavily inspired by No Longer Human and its protagonist, Ōba Yōzō, with a few references to the historical author's life, personality, and preferences. In regards to his past, he has no desires nor a reason to live and has suffered in solitude for most of his life. Thus, he resorts to playing the role of a clown and hiding most of his true emotions with suicidal antics. However, Dazai's character has still made significant progress towards the fulfilment of his friend Oda's dying wish for him to turn to the light, and uses his inner darkness and past experiences to serve as a guiding light.

In "Análise da representação de autores da literatura japonesa em Bungo Stray Dogs", Ana Clara Sousa Araújo said that the Bungo Stray Dogs help to promote real life authors by using their names for Atsushi and the rest. Atsushi finds himself lost when he discovers that the director of his former orphanage, the person he hated most in his life for always keeping him locked up, did so to prevent Atsushi from discovering who he really was, wishing to protect him from the truth about himself and his unconscious, savage actions. This point demonstrates the complexity of how different human ideals can affect reality, with situations where a completely inhumane and malicious action can be interpreted by another as a simple act of condolence. However, Atsushi is commonly considered an overshadowed protagonist, sometimes forgotten as the true protagonist by new readers or those who don't consume the manga itself. However, as the reading progresses, his important development in the work becomes noticeable, especially in his connections to the literary work "Sangetsuki" or The Moon over the Mountain, translated as "The Moon over the Mountain" or "The Beast under the Moonlight," by the classic author Atsushi Nakajima.

In "An Analysis Characters and Theme of Bungo Stray Dogs: Beast By Kafka Asagiri", Yani Octafia and Alliefa Nassandria Suwito from Universitas Pamulang said the series is common for portraying Atsushi's mental trauma over his tortures by his headmaster. He and Akutagawa and Dazai show notable parallels in the narrative with Atsushi attempting to present himself with a kind demeanor instead. However, this kind demeanor is not present in the novel Bungo Stray Dogs: Beast where he instead he is portrayed as both stoic and cold as his alternate self blindly follows the orders of Dazai. As Beast features Akutagawa as the protaogonist, Atsushi instead is written as an antagonist and with nearly an opposite characterization from him. Despite Atsuhi and Dazai being allies, the former is poorly treated by his boss when compared the original portrayal in the manga series, giving a sense of Atsushi being manipulated through his trauma. His personality is similar to that of how the American Psychiatric Association's analysis in regards to how a person can be manipulated through arousal and request orders

=== Anime ===
The anime series and its film have been popular, appearing in multiple polls involving its style and cosplay, among others. Atomix listed it as the fifth best anime from 2016, praising its premise, designs and references to writers. In the Newtype Anime Awards 2016–2017 at the Machi Asobi Vol. 19 event, the anime series took second place in the "Best Television Series" behind Fate/Apocrypha. Rebecca Silverman from Anime News Network listed the third season of the anime as one of her favorite anime from early 2019. The home media releases of the series were also popular in Japan, achieving good sales. The film Dead Apple was also the winner of Newtype's "Theatrical Film Award" in 2018. In 2019, the series once again took second place in the best television series award behind Demon Slayer: Kimetsu no Yaiba in the same magazine's awards. In 2023, Bungo Stray Dogs season 5 received Anime Corner's Anime of the Year Award, beating both Attack On Titan: The Final Chapters and Jujutsu Kaisen season 2.

Otaku USA stated that, while Atsushi becomes a hero of the story, he is overshadowed by others whose characters the reviewer found more interesting. Anime News Network felt that, while initially weak, Atsushi could become, little-by-little, a stronger person, due to the way Dazai guides him. The Fandom Post saw Atsushi as the readers' guide to the series since he was a newcomer whose introduction to the detective agency made it known to the readers as well. His final fight against Akutagawa in the first season received a positive response. There parallels between Atsushi and Kyoka were also praised due to how they bond, making the protagonist look more charming in the process. Anime News Network appreciated the new bond he formed with former Guild member Lucy Maud Montgomery; the reviewer expected that either a formal romance would develop between these two characters or a love triangle alongside Kyoka, who also had a strong bond with Atsushi. As a result, the writer said the story would benefit from this type of subplot since Bungo Stray Dogs rarely contained romance. When season two ended, The Fandom Post saw Atsushi's team up with Akutagawa as one of the best sequences in the series, which explored how the two characters felt during their interactions and production values made the fight more entertaining. Meanwhile, Anime News Network enjoyed the portrayal of Atsushi's thoughts regarding his abusive caretaker since he had a serious attitude when he talked about them while interacting with Akutagawa, feeling this made Atsushi appealing.

The flashback episodes from season two and three were the subject of positive response. Manga.Tokyo highly praised the relationship between the teenage Dazai and Odasaku since it shows the impact Odasaku had on the Dazai's characterization and growth as a person which contrasted with his regular personality, while UK Anime Network felt it made the cast look more rounded in the general due to the multiple use literal characters based on real life alongside Ango. Dazai's debut in the anime's third season earned praise from Manga.Tokyo for once again exploring his teenage years where his relationship with Chuuya Nakahara is revealed in the form of flashback episodes. The site noted that the debut explores the relationship between Dazai and Mori and how Mori sees himself in Dazai. Anime News Network noted how dark this incarnation of Dazai is as he does not appear to care for other people and instead ponders the idea of killing himself in contrast to his cheerful persona from the regular series.
