= List of Bungo Stray Dogs episodes =

Manga-based anime

The Bungo Stray Dogs anime television series focuses on individuals who are gifted with supernatural powers and use them for different purposes including holding a business, solving mysteries, and carrying out missions assigned by the mafia. The story mainly follows the members of the "Armed Detective Agency" and their everyday lives. It is produced by Bones was directed by Takuya Igarashi and written by Yōji Enokido. Nobuhiro Arai and Hiroshi Kanno served as the chief animation directors, while the former also served as character designer along with Ryō Hirata.

Taku Iwasaki composed the series' music. Kazuhiro Wakabayashi was the series' sound director at Glovision. Additionally, Yumiko Kondou was the art director, Yukari Goto was the anime's colour designer, Tsuyoshi Kanbayashi was the director of photography, and Shigeru Nishiyama was the editor. Granrodeo performed the anime's opening theme, titled "Trash Candy", and Luck Life performed the anime's ending theme, titled "Namae wo Yobu yo" (名前を呼ぶよ; lit. 'Call Out the Name'). The first two seasons were released on DVD and Blu-ray between June 24, 2016, and August 4, 2017. Funimation licensed the series for English release, with the first compilation released on March 6, 2018.

The first season, containing twelve episodes, aired from April 7 to June 23, 2016, on Tokyo MX, Teletama, Chiba TV, tvk, GBS (Gifu Broadcasting), Mie TV, SUN, TVQ, and BS11. The second season, also containing twelve episodes, aired from October 6 to December 22, 2016. The series has been licensed for streaming by Crunchyroll. Screen Mode sung the opening theme titled "Reason Living" while Luck Life once again sung the ending theme titled "Kaze ga Fuku Machi" (風が吹く街; lit. 'Town Where Wind Blows').

An original video animation was bundled with the 13th limited edition volume of the manga, which was released on August 4, 2017.

In July 2018, it was announced that the series would receive a third season. The voice cast and staff reprised their roles from the past two seasons. The third season aired from April 12 to June 28, 2019, broadcasting on Tokyo MX, TVA, KBS, SUN, BS11, and Wowow. Granrodeo performed the third season's opening theme "Setsuna no Ai" (セツナの愛; lit. 'A Moment's Love'), while Luck Life performed the third seasons' ending theme "Lily".

A fourth season was announced in November 2021. It aired from January 4 to March 29, 2023. Screen Mode performed the opening theme "True Story", and Luck Life performed the ending theme "Shirushi" (しるし). After the broadcast of the fourth season's finale, a fifth season was announced. It aired from July 12 to September 20, 2023. The opening theme is "Kurogane no Ori" (鉄の檻; lit. 'Iron Cell') by Granrodeo, while the ending theme is "Kiseki" (軌跡; lit. 'Trails') by Luck Life.

The anime series is licensed in North America by Crunchyroll (with home media distribution from Funimation) and in the United Kingdom by Anime Limited.

== Series overview ==
Season	Episodes		Originally released	
Season	Episodes		First released	Last released
1	12		April 7, 2016	June 23, 2016
2	13	12	October 6, 2016	December 22, 2016
2	13	OVA	August 4, 2017	
3	12		April 12, 2019	June 28, 2019
4	13		January 4, 2023	March 29, 2023
5	11		July 12, 2023	September 20, 2023

== Episodes ==
=== Season 1 (2016) ===
No. overall	No. in season	Title (Note: English translated titles are taken from Crunchyroll.)	Directed by	Storyboarded by	Original release date
1	1	"Fortune Is Unpredictable and Mutable"; Transliteration: "Jinsei Banji Saiō ga Tora" (Japanese: 人生万事塞翁が虎)	Takuya Igarashi	Takuya Igarashi	April 7, 2016
2	2	"A Certain Bomb"; Transliteration: "Aru Bakudan" (Japanese: 或る爆弾)	Ikurō Satō	Takuya Igarashi	April 14, 2016
3	3	"Yokohama Gangster Paradise"; Transliteration: "Yokohama Gyangusutā Paradaisu" (Japanese: ヨコハマ ギャングスタア パラダヰス)	Kazuhiro Yoneda	Taizo Yoshida	April 21, 2016
4	4	"The Tragedy of the Fatalist"; Transliteration: "Unmeironsha no Himi" (Japanese: 運命論者の悲み)	Daigo Yamagishi	Michio Fukuda	April 28, 2016
5	5	"Murder on D Street"	Hiroki Ikeshita	Takahiro Ikezoe	May 5, 2016
6	6	"The Azure Messenger"; Transliteration: "Ao no Shito" (Japanese: 蒼の使徒)	Yoshiyuki Asai	Takuya Igarashi	May 12, 2016
7	7	"Love for the Disease Called Ideals"; Transliteration: "Risō to Iu Yamai wo Aisu" (Japanese: 理想という病を愛す)	Ikurō Satō	Takuya Igarashi	May 19, 2016
8	8	"Teaching Them To Kill; Then To Die"; Transliteration: "Hito wo Koroshite Shine yo Tote" (Japanese: 人を殺して死ねよとて)	Kazuhiro Yoneda	Takahiro Ikezoe	May 26, 2016
9	9	"The Beauty Is Quiet Like a Stone Statue"; Transliteration: "Utsukushiki Hito wa Sabi to Shite Sekizō no Gotoku" (Japanese: うつくしき人は寂として石像の如く)	Hiroki Ikeshita	Taizo Yoshida	June 2, 2016
10	10	"Rashoumon and the Tiger"; Transliteration: "Rashōmon to Tora" (Japanese: 羅生門と虎)	Daigo Yamagishi	Takahiro Ikezoe	June 9, 2016
11	11	"First, an Unsuitable Profession for Her"; Transliteration: "Sono Ichi『Kanojo ni Mukanai Shokugyō』" (Japanese: 其の一『彼女には向かない職業』)	Sayaka Morikawa	Taizo Yoshida	June 16, 2016
11	11	"Second, an Ecstatic Detective Agency"; Transliteration: "Sono Ni『Uchōten Tanteisha』" (Japanese: 其の二『有頂天探偵社』)	Sayaka Morikawa	Taizo Yoshida	June 16, 2016
12	12	"Borne Back Ceaselessly into the Past"; Transliteration: "Taemanaku Kako e Oshimodosare nagara" (Japanese: たえまなく過去へ押し戻されながら)	Ikurō Satō	Takahiro Ikezoe	June 23, 2016

=== Season 2 (2016) ===
No. overall	No. in season	Title	Directed by	Storyboarded by	Original release date
13	1	"The Dark Age"; Transliteration: "Kuro no Jidai" (Japanese: 黒の時代)	Yoshiyuki Asai	Takuya Igarashi	October 6, 2016
14	2	"Nowhere to Return"; Transliteration: "Modorenai Basho" (Japanese: 戻れない場所)	Hiroki Ikeshita	Takuya Igarashi	October 13, 2016
15	3	"A Room Where We Can Someday See the Ocean"; Transliteration: "Itsuka Umi no Mieru Heya de" (Japanese: いつか海の見える部屋で)	Ikurō Satō	Takuya Igarashi	October 20, 2016
16	4	"Bungo Stray Dog"; Transliteration: "Bungō Sutorei Doggu" (Japanese: 文豪ストレイドッグ)	Yoshiyuki Asai	Takuya Igarashi	October 27, 2016
17	5	"Three Companies Conflict"; Transliteration: "Sansha Teiritsu" (Japanese: 三社鼎立(ていりつ))	Sayaka Morikawa	Hideyo Yamamoto	November 3, 2016
18	6	"The Strategy of Conflict"	Takanori Yano	Taizo Yoshida	November 10, 2016
19	7	"Will of Tycoon"; Transliteration: "Wiru obu Taikūn" (Japanese: ウィル・オブ・タイクーン)	Ikurō Satō	Yoshiyuki Asai	November 17, 2016
20	8	"Though the Mind May be Wrong"; Transliteration: "Atama wa Machigau Koto ga Atte mo" (Japanese: 頭は間違うことがあっても)	Sayaka Morikawa	Hiroko Utsumi	November 24, 2016
21	9	"Double Black"; Transliteration: "Futatsu no Kuro" (Japanese: 双(ふた)つの黒)	Takanori Yano	Taizo Yoshida	December 1, 2016
22	10	"Poe and Rampo"; Transliteration: "Sono Ichi『Pō to Ranpo』" (Japanese: 其の一『ポオと乱歩』)	Takebumi Anzai	Michio Fukuda	December 8, 2016
22	10	"Moby Dick, Swimming in the Sky"; Transliteration: "Sono Ni『Ama no Umi o Yuku Hakugei no Arite』" (Japanese: 其の二『天(あま)の海をゆく白鯨のありて』)	Takebumi Anzai	Michio Fukuda	December 8, 2016
23	11	"Rashoumon, the Tiger, and the Last Emperor"; Transliteration: "Rashōmon to Tora to Saigo no Tai-kun" (Japanese: 羅生門と虎と最後の大君(たいくん))	Ikurō Satō	Michio Fukuda	December 15, 2016
24	12	"If I May Shed Away My Burden Now"; Transliteration: "Moshi Kyō Kono Nimotsu o Oroshite Yoi no nara" (Japanese: 若し今日この荷物を降ろして善いのなら)	Takuya Igarashi	Takuya Igarashi	December 22, 2016
25 (Note: This OVA is officially counted as the 25th overall episode of the TV series.)	OVA	"Walking Alone"; Transliteration: "Hitori Ayumu" (Japanese: 独り歩む)	Ikurō Satō	Hiroko Utsumi	August 4, 2017

=== Season 3 (2019) ===
No. overall	No. in season	Title	Directed by	Storyboarded by	Original release date
26	1	"Dazai, Chuuya, Fifteen Years Old"; Transliteration: "Dazai, Chūya, Jūgo-sai" (Japanese: 太宰、中也、十五歳)	Ikurō Satō	Takuya Igarashi	April 12, 2019
27	2	"God of Fire"; Transliteration: "Aragami wa Ima" (Japanese: 荒神は今)	Takahiro Hasui	Takuya Igarashi	April 19, 2019
28	3	"Only a Diamond Can Polish a Diamond"; Transliteration: "Daiya wa Daiya-de Shika" (Japanese: ダイヤはダイヤでしか)	Ikurō Satō	Takuya Igarashi	April 26, 2019
29	4	"My Ill Deeds Are the Work of God"; Transliteration: "Toga Ataeru wa Kami no Gō" (Japanese: 咎与うるは神の業)	Daisuke Chiba	Michio Fukuda	May 3, 2019
30	5	"Slap the Stick & Addict"	Takahiro Hasui	Takahiro Hasui	May 10, 2019
31	6	"Herurisu!"; Transliteration: "Sono Ichi『Herurisu!』" (Japanese: 其の一『ヘルリス！』)	Yoshiyuki Asai	Yoshiyuki Asai	May 17, 2019
31	6	"Portrait of a Father"; Transliteration: "Sono Ni『Chichi no Shōzō』" (Japanese: 其の二『父の肖像』)	Yoshiyuki Asai	Yoshiyuki Asai	May 17, 2019
32	7	"Fitzgerald Rising"; Transliteration: "Fittsujerarudo Raijingu" (Japanese: フィッツジェラルド・ライジング)	Ikurō Satō	Michio Fukuda	May 24, 2019
33	8	"The Masked Assassin"; Transliteration: "Kamen no Ansatsusha" (Japanese: 仮面ノ暗殺者)	Daisuke Chiba	Yoshiyuki Asai	May 31, 2019
34	9	"Cannibalism (Part One)"; Transliteration: "Tomogui (Sono Ichi)" (Japanese: 共喰い（其の一）)	Takanori Yano	Taizo Yoshida	June 7, 2019
35	10	"Cannibalism (Part Two)"; Transliteration: "Tomogui (Sono Ni)" (Japanese: 共喰い（其の二）)	Takahiro Hasui	Takahiro Hasui	June 14, 2019
36	11	"Cannibalism (Part Three)"; Transliteration: "Tomogui (Sono San)" (Japanese: 共喰い（其の三）)	Ikurō Satō	Yoshiyuki Asai	June 21, 2019
37	12	"Echo"; Transliteration: "Ekō" (Japanese: 回向(ECHO))	Takuya Igarashi	Takuya Igarashi	June 28, 2019

=== Season 4 (2023) ===
No. overall	No. in season	Title	Directed by	Storyboarded by	Original release date
38	1	"The Lone Swordsman and the Famous Detective"; Transliteration: "Ko Kenshi to Meitantei" (Japanese: 孤剣士と名探偵)	Takayuki Yamamoto	Takuya Igarashi	January 4, 2023
39	2	"The Day Is a Dream, The Night Is Real"; Transliteration: "Hiru wa Yume, Yoru zo Utsutsu" (Japanese: 晝は夢、夜ぞ現)	Akiyo Ohashi	Takuya Igarashi	January 11, 2023
40	3	"The Secret Founding of the Detective Agency"; Transliteration: "Tantei-sha Setsuritsu Hiwa" (Japanese: 探偵社設立秘話)	Sayaka Morikawa	Takuya Igarashi	January 18, 2023
41	4	"A Perfect Murder and Murderer (Part 1)"; Transliteration: "Kanpekina Satsujin to Satsujin-sha (Sono Ichi)" (Japanese: 完璧な殺人と殺人者（其の一）)	Masatoyo Takada	Yoshiyuki Asai	January 25, 2023
42	5	"A Perfect Murder and Murderer (Part 2)"; Transliteration: "Kanpekina Satsujin to Satsujin-sha (Sono Ni)" (Japanese: 完璧な殺人と殺人者（其の二）)	Takanori Yano	Taizo Yoshida	February 1, 2023
43	6	"Tragic Sunday"; Transliteration: "Higekinaru Nichiyōbi" (Japanese: 悲劇なる日曜日)	Takayuki Yamamoto	Yoshiyuki Asai	February 8, 2023
44	7	"Dogs Hunt Dogs"	Kōta Mori	Yoshiyuki Asai	February 15, 2023
45	8	"You, A Child of Sin; I, A Child of Sin"; Transliteration: "Kimi mo Tsumi no Ko, Ware mo Tsumi no Ko" (Japanese: 君も罪の子、我も罪の子)	Akiyo Ohashi	Hiroshi Hara	February 22, 2023
46	9	"A Dream of Butterflies"; Transliteration: "Chō o Yumemu" (Japanese: 蝶を夢む)	Sayaka Morikawa	Kotaro Tamura	March 1, 2023
47	10	"In Lament of My Wingless Body"; Transliteration: "Hanenaki Mi no Kanashiki ka na" (Japanese: 翅無き身の悲しきかな)	Takanori Yano	Taizo Yoshida	March 8, 2023
48	11	"Jailbreak"; Transliteration: "Datsugokuki" (Japanese: 脱獄記)	Masatoyo Takada	Kotaro Tamura	March 15, 2023
49	12	"Bungo Hound Dogs"; Transliteration: "Bungō Haundo Doggusu" (Japanese: 文豪ハウンドドッグス)	Takayuki Yamamoto	Nobu Horimoto	March 22, 2023
50	13	"Skyfall"	Takanori Yano & Takahiro Hasui	Kotaro Tamura	March 29, 2023

=== Season 5 (2023) ===
No. overall	No. in season	Title	Directed by	Storyboarded by	Original release date
51	1	"The Strongest Man"; Transliteration: "Saikyō no Otoko" (Japanese: 最強の男)	Shinnosuke Itō	Taizo Yoshida	July 12, 2023
52	2	"The Answer to Everything"; Transliteration: "Subete no Kotae he" (Japanese: 凡テノ答ヘ)	Akiyo Ohashi	Takuya Igarashi & Masatoyo Takada	July 19, 2023
53	3	"Hero vs. Criminal"	Shinnosuke Itō	Shinnosuke Itō	July 26, 2023
54	4	"Hero War, Gang War."	Koji Nagatomi	Takahiro Hasui	August 2, 2023
55	5	"At the Port in the Sky (Part 1)"; Transliteration: "Sora no Minato Nitte (Sono Ichi)" (Japanese: 空ノ港ニテ（其の一）)	Takayuki Yamamoto	Taizo Yoshida	August 9, 2023
56	6	"At the Port in the Sky (Part 2)"; Transliteration: "Sora no Minato Nitte (Sono Ni)" (Japanese: 空ノ港ニテ（其の二）)	Takanori Yano	Tomoyo Kamoi	August 16, 2023
57	7	"At the Port in the Sky (Part 3)"; Transliteration: "Sora no Minato Nitte (Sono San)" (Japanese: 空ノ港ニテ（其の三）)	Shinnosuke Itō	Masatoshi Hakada	August 23, 2023
58	8	"Land of Inhuman Demons (Part 1)"; Transliteration: "Jingai Makyō (Sono Ichi)" (Japanese: 人外魔境（其の一）)	Kōta Mori	Kōta Mori	August 30, 2023
59	9	"Land of Inhuman Demons (Part 2)"; Transliteration: "Jingai Makyō (Sono Ni)" (Japanese: 人外魔境（其の二）)	Takayuki Yamamoto	Akiyo Ohashi	September 6, 2023
60	10	"Land of Inhuman Demons (Part 3)"; Transliteration: "Jingai Makyō (Sono San)" (Japanese: 人外魔境（其の三）)	Takanori Yano & Tomoyo Kamoi	Tomoyo Kamoi	September 13, 2023
61	11	"Twilight Goodbye"; Transliteration: "Tasogare no Sayōnara" (Japanese: 黄昏のさようなら)	Takayuki Yamamoto, Koji Nagatomi, Shinnosuke Itō & Kōta Mori	Yoshiyuki Asai & Takuya Igarashi	September 20, 2023

== Bungo Stray Dogs Wan! ==
=== Season 1 (2021) ===
No. overall	No. in season	Title (Note: English translated titles are taken from Crunchyroll.)	Directed by (Note: Information is taken from the ending credits of each episode.)	Written by	Original release date
1	1	"Bungo Stray Dogs Real"; Transliteration: "Bungō Sutorei Doggusu Riaru" (Japanese: 文豪ストレイドッグスREAL)	Toshihiro Kikuchi	Kazuyuki Fudeyasu	January 13, 2021
1	1	"What's Inside the Locker?"; Transliteration: "Rokkā no Nakami wa Nandesho na?" (Japanese: ロッカーの中身はなんでしょな？)	Toshihiro Kikuchi	Kazuyuki Fudeyasu	January 13, 2021
1	1	"An Unfruitful Exchange"; Transliteration: "Kamiawanai Yaritori" (Japanese: 噛み合わないやりとり)	Toshihiro Kikuchi	Kazuyuki Fudeyasu	January 13, 2021
2	2	"Let's Go Flower Gazing!"; Transliteration: "Ohanami ni Ikō!" (Japanese: お花見に行こう！)	Toshihiro Kikuchi	Kazuyuki Fudeyasu	January 20, 2021
2	2	"To The Baths!"; Transliteration: "Ofuro ni Ikō!" (Japanese: お風呂に行こう！)	Toshihiro Kikuchi	Kazuyuki Fudeyasu	January 20, 2021
3	3	"Operation Errand Run"; Transliteration: "Otsukai Dai Sakusen" (Japanese: おつかい大作戦)	Ryō Katō	Kan'ichi Katō	January 27, 2021
3	3	"Finders Kyouka's"; Transliteration: "Kyōka no Hiroimono" (Japanese: 鏡花の拾いもの)	Ryō Katō	Kan'ichi Katō	January 27, 2021
3	3	"Rampo-san's Day Well Spent"; Transliteration: "Ranpo-san no Orikō na Ichinichi" (Japanese: 乱歩さんのお利口な一日)	Ryō Katō	Kan'ichi Katō	January 27, 2021
4	4	"Akutagawa-kun's Errands"; Transliteration: "Akutagawa-kun no Otsukai" (Japanese: 芥川君のお遣い)	Ryō Katō	Kan'ichi Katō	February 3, 2021
4	4	"The Mafia Member Who Doesn't Kill"; Transliteration: "Korosazu no Mafia" (Japanese: ころさずのまふぃあ)	Ryō Katō	Kan'ichi Katō	February 3, 2021
4	4	"Forming a Duo With Him: The Serious Part"; Transliteration: "Aitsu to Konbi〜Maji-hen〜" (Japanese: アイツとコンビ〜本気(マジ)編〜)	Ryō Katō	Kan'ichi Katō	February 3, 2021
5	5	"Dazai and Chuuya, Pretentious Fourteen-Year-Olds"; Transliteration: "Dazai Chūya Jūyon-sai (Chūnibyō)" (Japanese: 太宰・中也14歳（中二病）)	Tatsuya Sasaki	Kunihiko Okada	February 10, 2021
5	5	"A Day in Yokohama"; Transliteration: "Toaru Yokohama no Ichinichi" (Japanese: とある横浜の一日)	Tatsuya Sasaki	Kunihiko Okada	February 10, 2021
5	5	"The Boy and the Puppy"; Transliteration: "Shōnen to Koinu" (Japanese: 少年と子犬)	Tatsuya Sasaki	Kunihiko Okada	February 10, 2021
6	6	"Dazai-san's Nail Biter"; Transliteration: "Hiyahara Dazai-san" (Japanese: ヒヤハラ太宰さん)	Toshihiro Kikuchi	Kan'ichi Katō	February 17, 2021
6	6	"If Only I Could Express My Hundred Thoughts"; Transliteration: "Hyaku no Omoi o Tsugeta Nara" (Japanese: 百の思いを告げたなら)	Toshihiro Kikuchi	Kan'ichi Katō	February 17, 2021
6	6	"Please Share! Armed Detective Agency!"; Transliteration: "Kakusan Kibō! Busō Tantei-sha!" (Japanese: 拡散希望！武装探偵社！)	Toshihiro Kikuchi	Kan'ichi Katō	February 17, 2021
7	7	"Bungo Stray Dogs Preschool"; Transliteration: "Bunsuto Hoikuen!" (Japanese: 文ストほいくえん！)	Tatsuya Sasaki	Konomi Shugo	February 24, 2021
8	8	"Hang in There, Higuchi-san!"; Transliteration: "Ganbare Higuchi-san!" (Japanese: がんばれ樋口さん！)	Ryō Katō	Konomi Shugo	March 3, 2021
8	8	"And the Tracks Go On and On"; Transliteration: "Senro wa Tsuzuku yo Doko Made mo" (Japanese: 線路は続くよどこまでも)	Ryō Katō	Konomi Shugo	March 3, 2021
8	8	"Operation Body Double Nom Nom"; Transliteration: "Kage Musha Mushamusha Dai Sakusen" (Japanese: 影武者むしゃむしゃ大作戦)	Ryō Katō	Konomi Shugo	March 3, 2021
9	9	"Dr. Yosano's Whoopsies! Forgetfulness"; Transliteration: "Yosano Ishi no Ukkari! Wasuremono" (Japanese: 与謝野医師のうっかり！忘れ物)	Directed by : Satoshi Nakagawa; Storyboarded by : Ryō Katō	Kan'ichi Katō	March 10, 2021
9	9	"Miscellany on Shrimp Tails"; Transliteration: "Ebi no Shippo no Etosetora" (Japanese: 海老の尻尾のエトセトラ)	Directed by : Satoshi Nakagawa; Storyboarded by : Ryō Katō	Kan'ichi Katō	March 10, 2021
9	9	"Me Drawing You Drawing Me"; Transliteration: "Boku o Kaku Kimi o Kaku Boku" (Japanese: 僕を描く君を描く僕)	Directed by : Satoshi Nakagawa; Storyboarded by : Ryō Katō	Kan'ichi Katō	March 10, 2021
10	10	"Oden with the White Tiger"; Transliteration: "Shiroi Tora to Oden o" (Japanese: 白い虎とおでんを)	Directed by : Tatsuya Sasaki; Storyboarded by : Toshihiro Kikuchi	Konomi Shugo	March 17, 2021
10	10	"Elevator Panic"; Transliteration: "Erebētā Panikku" (Japanese: エレベーターパニック)	Directed by : Tatsuya Sasaki; Storyboarded by : Toshihiro Kikuchi	Konomi Shugo	March 17, 2021
10	10	"The Armed Detective Agency Beats the Heat"; Transliteration: "Busō Tantei-sha Nōryō o Suru" (Japanese: 武装探偵社納涼をする)	Directed by : Tatsuya Sasaki; Storyboarded by : Toshihiro Kikuchi	Konomi Shugo	March 17, 2021
11	11	"The Dark Era"; Transliteration: "Kuro no Jidai-hen" (Japanese: 黒の時代編)	Toshihiro Kikuchi	Kunihiko Okada	March 24, 2021
12	12	"Swap Theater"; Transliteration: "Torikaekko Gekijō" (Japanese: とりかえっこ劇場)	Toshihiro Kikuchi	Kazuyuki Fudeyasu	March 31, 2021
12	12	"My Treasure"; Transliteration: "Watashi no Takaramono" (Japanese: 私の宝物)	Toshihiro Kikuchi	Kazuyuki Fudeyasu	March 31, 2021
12	12	"Nakajima Atsushi's Plan"; Transliteration: "Nakajima Atsushi, Kakusaku Suru" (Japanese: 中島敦、画策する)	Toshihiro Kikuchi	Kazuyuki Fudeyasu	March 31, 2021

=== Season 2 (2026) ===
No. overall	No. in season	Title	Directed by	Written by	Original release date
13	1	"THE REAL RETURNS"; Transliteration: "Bungo Sutorei Doggusu Wan! THE REAL RETURNS!" (Japanese: 文豪ストレイドッグスわん！THE REAL RETURNS！)	Unknown	Unknown	July 2, 2026
13	1	"Atsushi's Sweet Recipe"; Transliteration: "Atsushi no Suītsu ☆ Kukkingu" (Japanese: 敦のスイーツ☆クッキング)	Unknown	Unknown	July 2, 2026
13	1	"Relativistic Dazai"; Transliteration: "Sōtaironteki Dazai" (Japanese: 相対論的太宰)	Unknown	Unknown	July 2, 2026
14	2	"Late Night Summons and Service"; Transliteration: "Shin'ya no Yobidashi Omotenashi?" (Japanese: 深夜の呼び出しおもてなし)	Unknown	Unknown	July 9, 2026
14	2	"Between Freedom and Duty"; Transliteration: "Jiyū to Gimu no Hazama de" (Japanese: 自由と義務のはざまで)	Unknown	Unknown	July 9, 2026
14	2	"Atsushi-kun and the Angel and Devil"; Transliteration: "Atsushi-kun, to Denshi to Akuma" (Japanese: 敦君と天使と悪魔)	Unknown	Unknown	July 9, 2026
14	2	"Won't Stop Counting Up"; Transliteration: "Kauntoappu ga Tomaranai" (Japanese: カウントアップが 止まらない)	Unknown	Unknown	July 9, 2026
15	3	"The Hunting Dogs Are Here!"; Transliteration: "Inu ga Kita!" (Japanese: 犬が来た!)	Unknown	Unknown	July 16, 2026
15	3	"Investigate the Strongest Military Police Squad!"; Transliteration: "Sagure! Gunkei Saikyō Butai" (Japanese: 探れ! 軍警最強部隊)	Unknown	Unknown	July 16, 2026
15	3	"The Ultimate Military Police (Parallel) Science Squad's (Super Scary) Hunting Dog Lab"; Transliteration: "Gunkei Saikyō Kagaku Butai: Ryōken Kenkyūjo" (Japanese: 軍警最強化学部隊 猟犬研究所)	Unknown	Unknown	July 16, 2026
16	4	"Laid-Back Guild"; Transliteration: "Yuru Girudo" (Japanese: ゆるぎるど)	Unknown	Unknown	July 23, 2026
16	4	"We Intelligent Men"; Transliteration: "Atama no Yoi Bokutachi wa" (Japanese: 頭の善い僕たちは)	Unknown	Unknown	July 23, 2026
16	4	"Kyou-chan and Lu-chan"; Transliteration: "Kyo-chan to Ru-chan" (Japanese: きょーちゃんとルちゃん)	Unknown	Unknown	July 23, 2026
17	5	"Bungo Stray Dogs Preschool 2"; Transliteration: "Bunsuto Hoikuen! 2" (Japanese: 文ストほいくえん! 2)	Unknown	Unknown	July 30, 2026
18	6	"Reclaim Your Bygone Youth!"; Transliteration: "Torimodose! Seishun! Sugisatta! Seishun!" (Japanese: 取り戻せ！ 青春！ 過ぎ去った！ 青春！)	Unknown	Unknown	August 6, 2026
18	6	"Oddly Incompatible"; Transliteration: "Bimyō ni Kamiawanai Futari!" (Japanese: 微妙に噛み合わない二人)	Unknown	Unknown	August 6, 2026
18	6	"The Cat, Akutagawa, and the Suspicious Gaze"; Transliteration: "Kyat! to Yatsugare Giwaku no Manazashi" (Japanese: キャッ！ とやつがれ疑惑の眼差し)	Unknown	Unknown	August 6, 2026
19	7	"Strength is Everything! Survive the Night!"; Transliteration: "Chikara Koso Subete! Ikinokore Night!" (Japanese: 力こそ全て！生き残れNight！)	Unknown	Unknown	August 13, 2026
19	7	"Sigma's Secret"; Transliteration: "Shiguma-kun no hi Mitsu" (Japanese: シグマくんのひ・み・つ)	Unknown	Unknown	August 13, 2026
20	8	"Clash! At a Dangerous Field Day!"; Transliteration: "Gekitotsu Kiken na Undōkai!" (Japanese: 激突！ 危険な運動会！)	Unknown	Unknown	August 20, 2026
21	9	"The Oddly Delightful Meeting"; Transliteration: "Kimyō de Yukai na Machiawase" (Japanese: 奇妙で愉快な待ち合わせ)	Unknown	Unknown	August 27, 2026
21	9	"Seize the Invisible Hand of God"; Transliteration: "Kami no Miezaru te o Tsukamu" (Japanese: 神の見えざる手を掴む)	Unknown	Unknown	August 27, 2026
21	9	"A Certain Secret Meeting"; Transliteration: "Toaru Himitsu no Kaigō" (Japanese: とある秘密の会合)	Unknown	Unknown	August 27, 2026
22	10	"Dazai, Chuuya, Age 14 (Edgelord Era) ~ Personal Tastes"; Transliteration: "Dazai, Chūya, Jūyon-sai (Chūnibyō) ~ Shumi no Shō" (Japanese: 太宰、中也、十四歳(中二病)～趣味の章)	Unknown	Unknown	September 3, 2026
22	10	"Dazai, Chuuya, Age 14 ~ Hypothetically Speaking"; Transliteration: "Dazai, Chūya, Jūyon-sai ~Moshimo Chikara ga Atta nara~" (Japanese: 太宰、中也、十四歳～もしも力があったなら)	Unknown	Unknown	September 3, 2026
22	10	"An Ambitious Age"; Transliteration: "Senobi Shitai Otoshigoro-tachi" (Japanese: 背伸びしたいお年頃たち)	Unknown	Unknown	September 3, 2026
22	10	"New Teacher Atsushi-sensei!"; Transliteration: "Shin'nin Kyōshi Atsushi Sensei!!" (Japanese: 新任教師 敦先生!!)	Unknown	Unknown	September 3, 2026
23	11	"Wan! The Dark Era Chapter 2"; Transliteration: "Wan! Kuro no Jidai-hen Dai-ni-shō" (Japanese: わん！ 黒の時代編 第二章)	Unknown	Unknown	September 10, 2026
24	12	"Write, Mushitarou-kun, Write!"; Transliteration: "Kake! Kake! Mushitarō-kun" (Japanese: 書け！ 書け！ 虫太郎くん)	TBA	TBA	September 17, 2026
24	12	"Don't Go"; Transliteration: "Kaeccha yā yo" (Japanese: 帰っちゃやーよ)	TBA	TBA	September 17, 2026
24	12	"May I Take Your Picture?"; Transliteration: "Oshashin Ichimai ii Desu ka?" (Japanese: お写真一枚良いですか？)	TBA	TBA	September 17, 2026
24	12	"THE REAL RETURNS! 2"	TBA	TBA	September 17, 2026
