= Gwendolyn Gourvenec =

French actress

Gwendolyn Gourvenec is a French actress.

She played Miss Chiffre in Le Petit Spirou, an adaptation of the comic strip of the same name.

== Life ==
Gourvenec grew up in Essonne.

== Filmography ==
=== Film ===
- 2011 : La Délicatesse by Stéphane and David Foenkinos: Pierre's friend
- 2012 : Hénaut Président by Michel Muller: Kathy
- 2014 : Situation amoureuse : C'est compliqué by Manu Payet and Rodolphe Lauga: Stéph (barmaid)
- 2014 : Macadam Baby by Patrick Bossard: Delphine
- 2015 : Un village presque parfait by Stéphane Meunier: Ève
- 2015 : WAX: We Are the X by Lorenzo Corvino: Joelle Bernard
- 2016 : Tout schuss by François Prévôt-Leygonie and Stéphan Archinard: Catherine Barns
- 2016 : L'Invitation by Michaël Cohen: Claire
- 2017 : Le Petit Spirou by Nicolas Bary: Mademoiselle Chiffre
- 2017 : L'Échange des princesses by Marc Dugain: Quadra
- 2018 : Close Enemies
- 2019 : Beaux-parents by Héctor Cabello Reyes: Chloé Fleury
- 2019 : Adoration by Fabrice Du Welz: Doctor Loisel
- 2021 : Superheroes by Paolo Genovese: Laurene

=== Télévision ===
- 2007 : Hénaut Président (TV series) by Michel Muller: Kathy
- 2009 : Comprendre et pardonner (TV series), episode Chère belle-mère by Jean-Marc Thérin: Vanessa
- 2011 : Le Temps du silence (film) by Franck Appréderis: Christina
- 2016 : Loin de chez nous (TV series) by Fred Scotlande: Sergent Gaultier
- 2016 : Cut ! (TV series; season 3) by Bertrand Cohen, Eugénie Dard, Marie Roussin and Stéphane Meunier: Sœur Ursule
- 2017 : La Loi de Gloria — L'avocate du Diable (film) by Didier Le Pêcheur: Salomé Mendoza
