= WAX: We Are the X =

- Directed by: Lorenzo Corvino
- Screenplay by: Lorenzo Corvino
- Starring: Gwendolyn Gourvenec; Davide Paganini; Jacopo Maria Bicocchi; Rutger Hauer
- Cinematography: Caterina Colombo; Corrado Serri
- Edited by: Mario Marrone
- Music by: Valeria Vaglio
- Release date: 2015
- Language: Italian

WAX: We Are the X is a 2015 Italian thriller drama film written and directed by Lorenzo Corvino, in his directorial debut. It stars Gwendolyn Gourvenec, Davide Paganini, Jacopo Maria Bicocchi, and Rutger Hauer.

== Cast ==
- Gwendolyn Gourvenec as Joelle Bernard
- Davide Paganini as Livio Nesi
- Jacopo Maria Bicocchi as Dario Cervi
- Rutger Hauer as Aron Mulder
- Jean-Marc Barr as Jean-Christophe Touchalier
- Andrea Renzi as Saverio
- Lily Bloom as Lily
- Claudia Gallo as Anne
- Andrea Sartoretti as the journalist
- Muriel Gandois as Sarah

== Production ==
The film was shot in the summer of 2013 between Rome, Monaco and the French Riviera. It was shot entirely in the first-person perspective.

== Reception ==
Italian critic Davide Pulici paired WAX to 1970s comedy-dramas by Dino Risi and Pasquale Festa Campanile. Paola Casella from Mymovies praised the director, noting "Corvino directs with a level of skill, taste, and attention to technical detail that bodes well for his future as a high-quality filmmaker."

The film was awarded Best Foreign Language Film at the 2015 International Filmmaker Festival of World Cinema London. For this film, Corvino was nominated for the David di Donatello for Best Directorial Debut.
