= Buraiha =

Literary movement in post-World War II Japan

The Buraiha or Decadent School (無頼派, buraiha, the school of irresponsibility and decadence) were a group of dissolute writers who expressed the aimlessness and identity crisis of post-World War II Japan. While not comprising a true literary school, the Buraiha writers were linked together by a similar approach to the subject matter and literary style. The main characters in works of the Buraiha feature anti-heroes that are dissolute and aimless. Their work was based on criticism of the complete body of pre-war Japanese literature as well as American social values that were introduced into Japanese society with the occupation. Their work did not appeal to any one particular group, and their range was not well defined.

== Writers ==
The term mainly applied to Ango Sakaguchi, Osamu Dazai and Sakunosuke Oda, however, it also often referred to others, such as Jun Ishikawa, Sei Itō, Jun Takami, Tanaka Hidemitsu and Kazuo Dan. Further, according to Takeo Okuno, the group also included Miyoshi Jūrō and Taiko Hirabayashi.

== Lifestyle ==
Buraiha writers are sometimes referred to as the "decadents" in the west because of the decadent lifestyle they lead, spending time in bars, using narcotics, and having frequent sexual relationships. A prime example of this is Ango Sakaguchi, who shocked the Japanese public by his publication of an essay entitled A Discourse on Decadence (堕落論, darakuron). This, according to one critic, "allowed the Japanese people, especially the youth of Japan, to redeem its sense of self and begin life in the postwar period."

== Term ==
The term "burai", which was bestowed on the group by conservative critics, literally meaning undependable, refers to someone whose behavior goes against traditional social conventions. Because of the subversive nature of their works, they were initially referred to as the Shingesakuha (新戯作派, lit. "The New Gesaku School) after an Edo-era literary movement, but the terms was replaced as less irreverent works became popular.
