= Lily Bloom =

French actress

- Education: French National Academy of Dramatic Arts
- Occupation: Actress

Lily Bloom is a French actress.

== Career ==
Bloom is a graduate of the French National Academy of Dramatic Arts (CNSAD) where she studied under the direction of Dominique Valadié, Daniel Mesguich, Muriel Mayette and Andrzej Seweryn. She also studied at the French drama school Cours Florent.

Bloom played the role of Jane Ashley in the French comedy Les Nuits de Sister Welsh with Anne Brochet. and appeared in the French television series Le Chasseur

On stage she has appeared in Terre Sainte, in Le Cid in the role Chimène at the CND de Montpellier-Théâtre Marigny, in the role of Elfie in Le Château de Wetterstein and as the angel in Laissez Moi Seule.

Bloom is also the author of the play Les Cadavre Hilares published by Atlantica-Séguier.

== Filmography ==
- Les Nuits de Sister Welsh (2009)
- Avec amour (2012)
- Vagabond Salon (2013)
- WAX: We Are the X (2015)
