= Bénabar =

French singer

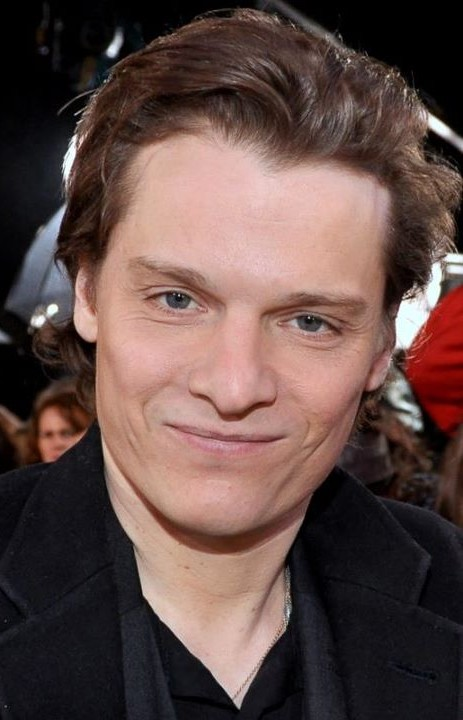
- Bénabar in 2012

Background information
- Born: Bruno Nicolini; 16 June 1969 (age 57)
- Origin: Thiais, France
- Genre: Chanson
- Occupations: Singer, songwriter
- Instrument: Vocals
- Years active: 1997–present
- Website: benabar.com

Bruno Nicolini (born 16 June 1969), better known by his stage name Bénabar, is a French songwriter and singer. His songs describe day-to-day life events with humour and a tender cynicism. His songs are influenced by French chanson and a heavy influence is placed on the piano or the accordion and on typical French fanfare (brass band) for the most upbeat of them. This genre of music is very typically French and differs from most in that emphasis is placed on appreciation of the lyrics and that it is linked to a specific culture of modern "guinche" (slang for "guinguette") appreciated a lot by Bobos among others.

== Biography ==
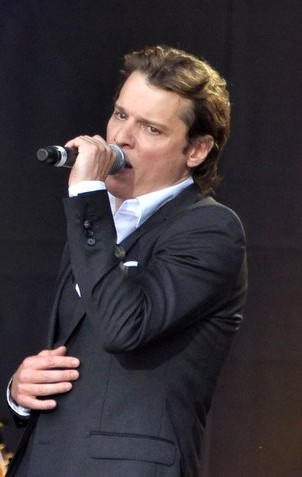
Bénabar performing in Paris on Bastille Day 2011.

Bénabar began his career in the cinema, working as an assistant on Le Brasier (1991) before directing three short subjects: Nada Lezard (1991), José Jeannette (1992) and Sursum corda (1994). He then turned to music, working for some time with his friend Patchol, who gave him his nickname (Bénabar being the "verlan" of Barnabé, the name he was using on stage). With "Les associés" he sang for several years in small places in France, Belgium, and Switzerland before the release of Bénabar (2001), which raised his profile sufficiently to make him the opening act for Henri Salvador. He was nominated as a Revelation for the "Victoires de la musique 2003" but did not win it. In 2004, after the successful release of Les risques du métier, he won the award for "album "chanson/variété" of the year". His next album Reprise des négociations sold better than the previous ones: according to Le Figaro, Bénabar reached number 4 for CD sales in France, with 2.18 million euros in sales in 2006. In 2007, he won the awards for "Male group or artist of the year" and "original song of the year" (for Le dîner).

== Personal life ==
He has two brothers named Patrick and Sébastien. He has a son born in 2004 named Manolo and a daughter born in 2009.

== Philanthropy ==
Bénabar has been a member of the Les Enfoirés charity ensemble since 2007.

== Discography ==
=== Studio albums ===
Year	Album	FRA	BEL (Wa)	SWI	Sales
1997	La p'tite monnaie Bénabar et associés	194	—	—	
2001	Bénabar	20	—	—	France: Platinum (510,100)
2003	Les risques du métier	6	31	40	France: Platinum (569,300)
2005	Reprise des négociations	1	5	25	France: Diamond (1,045,400)
2008	Infréquentable	1	1	6	France: Platinum (200,000)
2011	Les bénéfices du doute	4	5	23	France: Platinum (200,000)
2014	Inspiré de faits réels	2	2	9	
2018	Le début de la suite	3	4	9	
2021	Indocile heureux	1	6	—	
2021	On lâche pas l'affaire	30	53	37	

=== Live albums ===
Year	Album	FRA	BEL (Wa)	SWI	Sales
2004	Live au Grand Rex	10	28	41	France: Gold (173,100)
2012	Bien l'bonsoir m'sieurs-dames	26	23	—	

=== Compilations ===
Year	Album	BEL (Wa)	SWI	Sales
2004	Couche-tard et lève-tôt (Quebec release)	—	—	
2007	Best Of	5	53	France: Gold (75,000)

=== Singles ===
Year	Single	FRA	BEL (Wa) Ultratop	BEL (Wa) Ultratip	SWI	Album
2003	"L'itinéraire"	—	—	—	—	Les risques du métier
2003	"Dis-lui oui"	—	—	—	—	Les risques du métier
2003	"Je suis de celles"	—	—	—	—	Les risques du métier
2005	"Le dîner"	—	—	—	—	Reprise des négociations
2005	"Maritie & Gilbert Carpentier"	—	—	—	—	Reprise des négociations
2005	"Quatre murs et un toit"	—	—	—	—	Reprise des négociations
2008	"L'effet papillon"	169	4	—	65	Infréquentable
2009	"À la campagne"	—	—	12 ^{A}	—	Infréquentable
2009	"Une petite cantate" (with Keim, Jenifer and Raphaël)	—	29	—	—	2009: Les Enfoirés font leur cinéma (Various Artists)
2009	"Pas du tout"	—	—	22 ^{A}	—	Infréquentable
2009	"Infréquentable"	—	—	24 ^{A}	—	Infréquentable
2011	"Politiquement correct"	75	28	—	—	Les bénéfices du doute
2012	"Les râteaux"	—	—	12 ^{A}	—	Bien l'bonsoir m'sieurs-dames
2012	"L'agneau"	—	—	9 ^{A}	—	Bien l'bonsoir m'sieurs-dames
2014	"Paris by Night"	142	—	—	—	

^{A} Chart peak for Ultratip.

Other singles

Year	Single	FRA	Album
2013	"Un arc en ciel" (Téléthon 2013) (Bénabar, Bruel, Cali & Marina)	1	

Preceded by Raphaël	Victoires de la Musique; Male group or artist of the year 2007	Succeeded by Abd Al Malik

== Filmography ==
- 2009 : Incognito
- 2011 : Cars 2 - sings during a montage of Paris
- 2015 : The Night Watchman
- 2019 : Beaux-parents
