= Tout Schuss =

- Theatrical release poster
- Directed by: Stéphan Archinard; François Prévôt-Leygonie
- Written by: Serge Lamadie; Stéphan Archinard; François Prévôt-Leygonie
- Produced by: Jean-Yves Robin; Marc-Etienne Schwartz; Marc Stanimirovic
- Starring: José Garcia
- Cinematography: Stephan Massis
- Edited by: Reynald Bertrand
- Music by: Matthieu Gonet
- Production companies: M.E.S. Productions; Monkey Pack Films; France 2 Cinéma; SND Groupe M6
- Distributed by: SND Films
- Release date: 13 January 2016
- Running time: 96 minutes
- Country: France
- Language: French
- Budget: $6 million
- Box office: $3.6 million

Tout Schuss is a 2016 French comedy film directed by Stéphan Archinard and François Prévôt-Leygonie.

== Plot ==
Max Salinger, a self-centered divorced writer, refuses to accept his 15-year-old daughter under his roof. In revenge, she steals his last manuscript and got to the snow-class queue. To recover his property, Max then has no choice but to land in the ski resort improvising "accompanying parent." Only problem: the famous writer, which is already not an exemplary parent, is not really a skilled attendant either.

== Cast ==
- José Garcia as Max Salinger
- Alexia Barlier as Elsa Jay
- Melha Bedia as Brenda
- Gwendolyn Gourvenec as Katherine Barns
- Laurent Bateau as Yann
- Manon Valentin as Rosalie
- François Deblock as Steeve
- Tess Boutmann as Marion
- Victor Meutelet as Nathan
- Léopoldine Serre as Isabelle
- Anne Girouard as Sylvie
