= Beaux-parents =

2019 film

- Film poster
- Directed by: Héctor Cabello Reyes
- Written by: Bénabar; Héctor Cabello Reyes
- Starring: Josiane Balasko; Didier Bourdon; Bénabar; Charlie Bruneau; Bruno Salomone
- Cinematography: Vincent Muller
- Music by: Bénabar; Maxime Desprez; Michaël Tordjman
- Production company: Kabo Films
- Distributed by: UGC Distribution
- Release date: 19 June 2019
- Running time: 83 min
- Country: France
- Language: French
- Budget: $6.6 million
- Box office: $3.89 million

Beaux-parents (lit. 'Parents-in-law') is a 2019 French comedy directed by Héctor Cabello Reyes. Released only in France, it grossed $3.9 million.

== Cast ==
- Josiane Balasko as Coline Rossi
- Didier Bourdon as André Rossi
- Bénabar as Harold Becker
- Charlie Bruneau as Garance Rossi
- Bruno Salomone as Hervé Fleury
- Frédéric Bouraly as Lopez
- Gwendolyn Gourvenec as Chloé Fleury
- Ruggero Raimondi as Grandfather
