= Atlantica-Séguier =

Atlantica-Séguier (Created in 1984) is a French publishing house.

== Background ==
Created in 1984, the company has published more than 2,300 works which include fiction and non-fiction books as well as plays. The non-fiction focus is mainly on cinema, the theater, and painting as well as some specialty sports such as bullfighting. The company is headquartered in Biarritz, France and Paris, France.

== Works ==
Works published by Atlantica-Séguier include:

- Gabriel Dupont (1878–1914) ou La Mélancolie du Bonheur, by Philippe Simon
- Gibraltar, roisée de mondes et Gibraltar, improbable frontière by Zakya Daoud
- Les Cadavres Hilares, by Lily Bloom
- Maurice Duruflé : Souvenirs et autres écrits, by Frédéric Blan ISBN 2-84049-411-6
