= Hidemitsu Tanaka =

Japanese writer and rower

Tanaka Hidemitsu
- Tanaka Hidemitsu
- Born: 10 January 1913; Tokyo, Japan
- Died: 3 November 1949 (aged 36); Mitaka, Tokyo, Japan
- Occupation: Writer
- Writing career
- Genre: novels

Hidemitsu Tanaka (田中 英光, Tanaka Hidemitsu; 10 January 1913 – 3 November 1949) was a novelist of the Buraiha genre in Shōwa period Japan. His name was also pronounced "Tanaka Eiko" on occasion.

== Biography ==
Tanaka was born in the uptown Akasaka district of Tokyo as the son of a historian; however, he was listed under his mother's maiden name of “Tanaka” in the family register rather than his father's surname of Iwasaki. He grew up in Kamakura and was a graduate of Waseda University’s School of Political Science and Economics. While still a student, he was influenced by his newspaper journalist brother towards a literary career, and towards membership in the Japan Communist Party. However, he was discouraged by the corruption of the senior leadership of the party, and left before graduation. Shortly after graduation, he met Dazai Osamu, who became his mentor.

Also while still a university student, Tanaka was a member of the Japanese Olympic team to the 1932 Los Angeles Olympics, where he participated as a rower. Although he competed in eight events, he was eliminated during the qualifying round. This experience led to two novels: Orinposu no Kajitsu (The Fruit of Olympus, 1940) and Tantei Soshu (The Boat Rower, 1944).

In 1935, he was hired by the Yokohama Rubber Company and was sent to Keijo, or today's Seoul, Korea under the Japanese rule. He was used by Japanese authorities in Korea to organize Korean writers for a Greater East Asia Writer's Conference, the events of which he portrayed with bitterness and cynicism in his post-war novel The Drunken Ship.

He married Kiyo Kojima in 1937. He returned to Japan in 1944, and lived in Shizuoka Prefecture. In 1947, leaving his wife in Shizuoka, he moved to Shinjuku, Tokyo with his mistress.

After World War II, Tanaka re-joined the Japan Communist Party, but was so critical of its leadership that he was later expelled. He was greatly shocked by the suicide of his mentor Dazai Osamu. In his later years, he suffered from alcoholism, drug abuse and mental instability. He committed suicide at the grave of Dazai Osamu in 1949 by cutting his wrists after taking an overdose of sleeping pills. His grave is at the Aoyama Cemetery in central Tokyo.

His works include:

- オリンポスの果実
- さようなら
- 野狐

== See also ==
- Japanese literature
- List of Japanese authors
- Buraiha
