= Glovision =

Japanese post-production company

Glovision Inc.
- Native name: グロービジョン株式会社
- Company type: Corporation
- Industry: Media
- Founded: August 8, 1963
- Headquarters: 〒160-0012, Shinjuku, Tokyo Kōchi Prefecture, Japan
- Area served: Japan
- Key people: Ishibashi Takahumi (President)
- Net income: ¥30,000,000
- Owner: Kadokawa Corporation
- Website: www.glovision.co.jp

Glovision Inc. (Japanese: グロービジョン株式会社, Hepburn: Gurōbijon Kabushiki-Gaisha) is a Japanese post-production company, that subtitles, dubs and post-produces foreign television dramas and films, as well as sound production for anime. It also dubs character voices in Japanese for foreign video games that were originally developed outside Japan, for the releases of the region's market. Its major shareholder is Kadokawa Shoten.

== History ==
- Glovision was founded on August 8, 1963. Foreign drama and documentary programming dubbed foreign films in Japanese, and also while working on subtitling, audio-visual studio operates.
- National cartoon Sazae-san, including foreign drama was also a monument of the Columbo series, hit movies in recent years, mainly teenagers explosive worldwide like the Twilight film series, Korean drama's Jewel in the Palace, Blockbuster and Lee San in charge of dubbing and subtitling services for animation and a number of foreign works.
- In 2000 a subsidiary of Kadokawa Holdings known as Kadokawa Gerald Pictures Inc. was founded, taken under the 2005 banner and then changed its name to Kadokawa Herald Pictures, through the integration of Kadokawa Pictures subsequently changed its name, it was merged with Kadokawa Pictures in January 2011, and has become a wholly owned subsidiary of Kadokawa Shoten.
- On December 5, 2025, the Japanese Fair Trade Commission issued a formal recommendation to Glovision for a violation of the Japanese freelance worker-protection law. Between November 2023 and January 2024, Glovision had commissioned a number of dubbing and subtitling projects involving fifty‑five freelancers. However, according to the JFTC, the company not only did not disclose the terms of contract to said freelance workers, but also failed to pay their compensation fees by the due date. Following the announcement, Glovision issued a formal public apology and detailed a series of corrective measures in order to prevent similar recurrences.
