= Japanese destroyer Asagiri =

At least three warships of Japan have borne the name Asagiri:

- Japanese destroyer Asagiri (1903), a Harusame-class destroyer launched in 1903 and stricken in 1926
- Japanese destroyer Asagiri (1929), a Fubuki-class destroyer launched in 1929 and sunk in 1942
- JDS Asagiri (DD-151), an Asagiri-class destroyer launched in 1986
