= Sakunosuke Oda =

Japanese writer

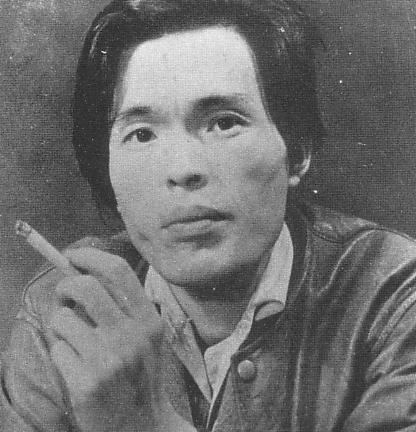
- Oda Sakunosuke, c. 1945.
- Born: October 26, 1913 Osaka, Osaka Prefecture, Japan
- Died: January 10, 1947 (aged 33) Tokyo, Japan
- Occupation: Novelist
- Genre: Contemporary
- Literary movement: I Novel, Buraiha

Sakunosuke Oda (織田 作之助, Oda Sakunosuke; October 26, 1913 – January 10, 1947) was a Japanese writer. He is often grouped with Osamu Dazai and Ango Sakaguchi as the Buraiha. Literally meaning ruffian or hoodlum faction, this label was not a matter of a stylistic school but one bestowed upon them by conservative critics disparaging the authors' attitudes and subject matter.

== Life and Writings ==
Oda's writing career spans both prewar and postwar Japan. A native of Osaka, he wrote about most of life in that city and the customs and manners of the common people there. In 1939, his story Zokushu (俗臭, Vulgarity) was a candidate for the Akutagawa Prize. The following year, Oda published Meoto Zenzai (夫婦善哉). Named after an Osaka sweet shop, it follows the life of a couple whose relationship survives despite the persistent wastefulness, debauchery, and unkept promises of the erring man.

Oda's characters usually did not fit into what was traditionally considered appropriate forms, either in their frank humanness or in their stubborn individuality, as in Roppakukinsei (六白金星, Six Platinum Stars/Six White Venus, 1946), or out of the cruel necessity of survival. In the story Sesō (世相, The State of the Times, 1946), Oda describes the first months of the occupation period following Japan's surrender at the end of World War II, which were marked by food shortages so severe that government rations were not enough even to sustain life and people turned to the black market to procure the food they needed for their survival. During Oda's lifetime, several of his works were banned.

Oda also wrote radio drama scenarios and submitted a script to a magazine that was later made into the film Kaette kita otoko (還って来た男, The Returnee, 1944), by Kawashima Yūzō (it was the director's commercial debut).

In addition to his fiction, Oda wrote many critical essays, most notably "Kanōsei no bungaku" (可能性の文学, "The Literature of Possibility", 1946).

In 1947, after suffering from a lung hemorrhage, Oda died in Tokyo Hospital. After the funeral, his friend and fellow writer Osamu Dazai published an emotional eulogy blaming the critics for Oda's sudden death. More likely, it was from a recurrent bout of tuberculosis. Oda is buried in Osaka.

In 1963, a monument was erected by Oda's friends and colleagues near Hozenji Temple in Osaka. Hozenji Yokochō and its surrounding alleys are one of the main settings in Meoto Zenzai.

In 1983, under the sponsorship of the Osaka Bungaku Shinkōkai, a literary prize was established in Oda's name to commemorate the 70th anniversary of his birth and to carry on the long tradition of Kansai literature. It is awarded annually to an outstanding work of fiction by a new author.

An autographed photograph of Oda hangs in the Osaka restaurant Jiyūken (自由軒). Jiyūken opened as a coffee and snack shop in 1910, and has become known for its style of "curry rice". It is mentioned in Oda's writings. The inscription says that Oda has died, but has left us some of the good flavors of curry rice in his writing. The photograph shows Oda writing while seated at a table in Jiyūken.

== Adaptations and Translations ==
Several of Oda's stories have been made into movies, including Deep Autumn (秋深き, Aki fukaki) (2008) and, most notably, Meoto zenzai, which has been adapted four times, including an award-winning film, released in 1955, which was directed by Toyoda Shirō, and starred Morishige Hisaya and Awashima Chikage.

Meoto zenzai, Roppakukinsei, and Sesō, along with another story, Ki no Miyako (木の都, "City of Trees", 1943–44), have been translated by Burton Watson and published together as Stories of Osaka Life (Columbia University Press, 1990; paperback, Weatherhill, 1994).

Yakōchū (夜光虫, "noctiluca scintillans", 1947), the story of a gang of pickpockets, a returnee soldier and other ne'er-do-wells struggling to make ends meet in immediate post-war, bombed out Osaka, was translated in 2025 by J.A. Buckley as Osaka Noctilucas.

== See also ==
- Japanese literature
- List of Japanese authors

== Notes ==
https://web.archive.org/web/20101126091605/http://japan-101.com/culture/oda_sakunosuke.htm
