= Blockbuster (2018 film) =

French comedy film by July Hygreck

- Directed by: July Hygreck
- Written by: July Hygreck (screenplay); Tom Hygreck (screenplay)
- Starring: Syrus Shahidi; Charlotte Gabris; Tom Hygreck
- Production companies: Virginie Films; Rosebud Entertainment Pictures; Other Angle Pictures
- Distributed by: Netflix
- Release date: 24 January 2018 (United States)
- Running time: 85 minutes
- Country: France
- Language: French

Blockbuster is a 2018 French comedy film about a man trying to win back his superhero-loving girlfriend after she dumps him over a video he made to amuse his ailing dad. The film was released worldwide on 24 January 2018 by Netflix although departed in January 2021.

== Synopsis ==
Jéremy is in a relationship with Lola. The young man decides to film their daily life and turn it into a video diary for his father, who is suffering from cancer. Thanks to these videos, which he watches like a series, his father can witness his son's happiness. But when Jérémy's girlfriend discovers that she is the subject of such an experiment, she leaves him immediately. He, who wants to do everything he can to win her back, comes up with a plan: to create a fake gang of superheroes who kidnap celebrities. Their only ransom demand: Lola.

== Cast ==
- Syrus Shahidi as Jéremy
- Charlotte Gabris as Lola
- Tom Hygreck as Mathias
- Gunther Love as Mickael (as Sylvain Quimène)
- Laura Boujenah as Sarah
- Foëd Amara as Sam
- Lionel Abelanski as Simon
- Laurent Bateau as Lola's father

== Production ==
The film was originally getting off the ground thanks to the crowdfunding platform KissKissBankBank before Netflix stepped in.
