= Kafka Asagiri =

Japanese artist and writer (born 1984)

- 朝霧カフカ
- Born: March 17, 1984 (age 42); Ehime Prefecture, Japan
- Occupations: Manga artist, Novelist
- Years active: 2010–present
- Notable work: Bungo Stray Dogs

Kafka Asagiri (Japanese: 朝霧カフカ, Hepburn: Asagiri Kafka; March 17, 1984) is a Japanese manga artist and novelist. Born in Ehime Prefecture, he is best known as the writer of the seinen manga series Bungo Stray Dogs.

== History ==
Originally a salaryman working for a car company, Asagiri had been thinking about becoming a scenario writer since his second or third year of work, but the company was so busy that he couldn't write stories while working. He quit the car company at the beginning of 2012.

After that, while preparing for job hunting related to screenplays, Asagiri decided to create something that people could watch for free. He started posting videos saying "I wanted to," along with creating videos serving as business cards, believing in the importance of work experience for becoming a professional. Then, his video "Slowly Youmu and the Really Scary Cthulhu Mythos" released on Nico Nico Douga received a great response and became popular.

Four months after he uploaded the video, Asagiri was approached by the editor-in-chief of Monthly Shonen Ace to bring in three projects in two weeks. After a meeting, they made their commercial debut with Bungo Stray Dogs. He debuted as a novelist with the novelization Bungo Stray Dogs: Osamu Dazai's Entrance Examination, a prequel to the same work.Yukkuri Youmu and the Really Scary Cthulhu Myth was later made into a manga called Minase Youmu and the Really Scary Cthulhu Myth, with Asagiri in charge of the original work.

For Bungo Stray Dogs, Asagiri was inspired by Shūsaku Endō's story Ryūgaku as well as Osamu Dazai's last novel No Longer Human. Asagiri decided to make his own take on Osamu Dazai stand out among the readers. Kadokawa Shoten approached Asagiri with writing more content for the characters, which led to the production of light novels where the writer decided to explore Dazai's past.

== Hobbies ==
Many works have influenced Asagiri, including JoJo's Bizarre Adventure. He also enjoyed reading YuYu Hakusho and Black Lagoon. Asagiri also enjoys international film and TV series, particularly The Avengers and The Dark Knight. When asked what exactly he likes about Western media, he bluntly answered that its accessibility makes it so attractive; American media is widely available through different platforms in Japan.

Asagiri enjoyed playing Dragon Quest, and was also addicted to the RPG production software RPG Maker and was always creating stories. When it comes to storywriting, he is not particular about mediums such as manga, novels, or games; he wants to create stories that are optimized for that medium.

== Works ==
=== Manga ===
- Bungo Stray Dogs (Young Ace January 2013 issue -, Illustration: Sango Harukawa)
- Youmu Minase and the really scary Cthulhu myth (Nico Nico Ace No. 73 - No. 129+130, Illustration: Masahiko Yoshihara)
- Ayane Shionomiya can't be wrong. (Monthly Shonen Ace August 2013 issue - January 2015 issue, illustration: Yukitoshi Nakamura)

=== Novel ===
- Bungo Stray Dogs series (April 1, 2014 -, Kadokawa Beans Bunko, Illustration: Sango Harukawa)
  - Bungo Stray Dogs Gaiden Natsuhiko Kyogoku VS Yukito Ayatsuji (Novelist Sari-sari October 2015 issue - January 2016 issue, Illustration: Sango Harukawa
- Guildre (Young Magazine Third 2014 Vol.1 - 2016 Vol.4, illustration: Ame Toba, mechanical design: Ryuichi Sadamatsu)
- Ghost in the Shell Novel Anthology (March 27, 2017, Kodansha)

=== Drama CD ===
- TV anime Bungo Stray Dogs original drama CD Slightly Extraordinary Days (2016)

=== Game ===
- Love Heaven (September 2014), April 2015・November, April 2016・June) - Supervision of collaboration scenario with "Bungo Stray Dogs"

=== Paperback commentary ===
- Yukito Ayatsuji "Another Episode S" (2016, Kadokawa Bunko)
