= Ango Sakaguchi =

Japanese writer (1906–1955)

- 坂口 安吾
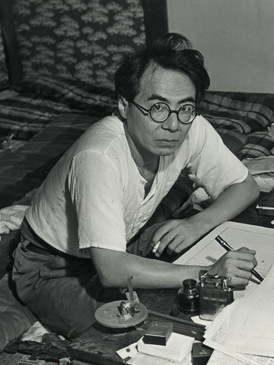
- Sakaguchi in 1946.
- Born: Heigo Sakaguchi; 20 October 1906; Niigata, Japan
- Died: 17 February 1955 (aged 48); Kiryū, Gunma, Japan
- Occupation: Writer
- Spouse: Michiyo Kaji (m. 1953–1955)
- Children: Tsunao Sakaguchi
- Writing career
- Genres: Novels, short stories, essay
- Notable works: Darakuron, Kazehakase

Ango Sakaguchi (坂口 安吾, Sakaguchi Ango; 20 October 1906 – 17 February 1955) was a Japanese writer, who wrote short stories and novels and was an essayist. His real name was Heigo Sakaguchi (坂口 炳五, Sakaguchi Heigo).

== Biography ==
Born in Niigata, Sakaguchi was part of a group of young Japanese writers to rise and prominence in the years immediately following Japan's defeat in World War II. Ango Sakaguchi was associated with the Buraiha or "Decadent School" (無頼派 buraiha, the school of irresponsibility and decadence), which designated a group of dissolute writers who expressed their perceived aimlessness and identity crisis of post-World War II Japan.

In 1946, he wrote his most famous essay, "Darakuron" ("Discourse on Decadence"), which examined the role of bushido during the war. It is widely argued that he saw postwar Japan as decadent, yet more truthful than a wartime Japan built on illusions like bushido. (The work itself does not make any claims about the meaning of decadence.)

Ango was born in 1906 and was the 12th child of 13. He was born in the middle of a Japan perpetually at war. His father was the president of the Niigata Shimbun newspaper, a politician, and a poet.

Ango wanted to be a writer at 16. He moved to Tokyo at 17, after hitting a teacher who caught him truanting. His father died from brain cancer the following year, leaving his family in massive debt. At 20, Ango taught for a year as a substitute teacher following secondary school. He became heavily involved in Buddhism and attended Toyo University to study Indian philosophy, graduating at the age of 25. Throughout his career as a student, Ango was very outspoken about his opinions.

He wrote various works of literature after graduating, receiving praise from writers such as Makino Shin'ichi. His literary career started around the same time as Japan's expansion into Manchuria. At 27, he met and became friends with Yada Tsuneko. His mother died when he was 37, in the middle of World War II. He struggled for recognition as a writer for years before finally finding it with "A Personal View of Japanese Culture" in 1942, and again with "On Decadence" in 1946.

In 1947, Ango Sakaguchi wrote an ironical murder mystery, Furenzoku satsujin jiken ("The Non-serial Murder Incident", translated and published in French as Meurtres sans série), for which he received the Mystery Writers of Japan Award in 1948. Ango had a child at 42 with his wife, Michiyo Kaji. Ango later died from a brain aneurysm at age 48 in 1955, in Kiryū, Gunma.

== Works in English translation ==
- Literary Mischief: Sakaguchi Ango, Culture, and the War, edited by James Dorsey and Doug Slaymaker, with translations by James Dorsey. Lanham, MA: Lexington Books, 2010. (Critical essays by Doug Slaymaker, James Dorsey, Robert Steen, Karatani Kojin, and Ogino Anna.)
  - Short story
    - "Pearls" (Shinju, 1942)
  - Essays
    - "A Personal View of Japanese Culture" (Nihon bunka shikan, 1942)
    - "Discourse on Decadence" (Darakuron, 1946)
    - "Discourse on Decadence, Part II" (Zoku darakuron, 1946)
- The Nonserial Murders (Furenzoku Satsujin Jiken, 1948). Transl. by Shelley Marshall. J Pop Books, 2022
- The Coincidental Murders (Furenzoku Satsujin Jiken, 1948). Transl. by Alexis J. Brown. . Zakuro Books, 2024

Short stories

- "The Idiot" (Hakuchi, 1946). Transl. by George Saitо̄ in Modern Japanese Stories, ed. by Ivan Morris. Rutland and Tokyo: Charles E. Tuttle Company, 1962, pp. 383–410.
- "I Want to Be Holding the Sea" (海を抱きしめていたい), Transl. by Shogo Oketani and Leza Lowitz in Towards a Literature of the Periphery: Manoa (Honolulu, Hawaii : 1995), 7, no. 1.
- "One Woman and the War" (Zoku Sensо̄ to hitori no onna, 1946). Transl. by Lane Dunlop in Autumn Wind and Other Stories. Rutland and Tokyo: Charles E. Tuttle Company, 1994, pp. 140–160.
- "In the Forest, Under Cherries in Full Bloom" (Sakura no mori no mankai no shita, 1947). Trans. by Jay Rubin in The Oxford Book of Japanese Short Stories, ed. by Theodore W. Goossen. Oxford and New York: Oxford University Press, 1997, pp. 187–205.
- "The War and a Woman" (Sensо̄ to hitori no onna, 1946). Transl. by Robert Zetzsche in Sakiko Nomura: Ango. Tokyo: Match and Company, 2017.
- Wind, Light, and the Twenty-Year-Old-Me (風と光と二十の私と) (abridged), translated by Reiko Seri and Doc Kane. Kobe: Maplopo, 2020.

Essay

- "A Personal View of Japanese Culture" (Nihon bunka shikan, 1942) (abridged). Transl. by James Dorsey in The Columbia Anthology of Modern Japanese Literature, Volume 1, ed. by Thomas Rimer and Van Gessel. New York: Columbia University Press, 2002, pp. 823–835.

== See also ==
- Un-Go - a 2011 anime series based on Ango's works
- Aoi Bungaku - episodes 5 and 6 are based on Ango's "In the Forest, Under Cherries in Full Bloom".
- The anime Bungo Stray Dogs where a character is named after him
