= François Prévôt-Leygonie =

French director and dramatist

- Born: 16 July 1967 (age 59); Besançon
- Occupations: Film director, actor

François Prévôt-Leygonie (born 16 July 1967) is a French film director, dramatist, screenwriter and actor who works essentially with Stéphan Archinard.

== Filmography ==
Director, in collaboration with Stéphan Archinard

- 2013 : Amitiés sincères
- 2015 : La surface de réparation
- 2015 : Tout Schuss

Actor

- 1995 : Une femme française (feature film) by Régis Wargnier
- 1997 : On Guard by Philippe de Broca
- 2005 : Le plus beau jour de sa vie (short film) by Stéphan Archinard

== Theatre ==
Author, with Stéphan Archinard

- 2005 : Amitiés sincères, directed by Bernard Murat
