= List of Japanese writers: H =

The following is a list of Japanese writers whose family name begins with the letter H

List by Family Name: A - B - C - D - E - F - G - H - I - J - K - M - N - O - R - S - T - U - W - Y - Z
- Hagiwara Sakutaro (November 1, 1886 – May 11, 1942)
- Hanada Kiyoteru (March 29, 1909 – September 23, 1974)
- Haniya Yutaka (December 19, 1909 – February 19, 1997)
- Hanmura Ryō (October 27, 1933 – March 4, 2002)
- Hara Takashi (February 9, 1856 – November 4, 1921)
- Hara Tamiki (November 15, 1905 – March 13, 1951)
- Hase Seishū (born February 18, 1965)
- Hasegawa Kaitarō (17 January 1900 – 29 June 1935)
- Hasegawa Nyozekan (1875–1969)
- Hasegawa Shigure (October 1, 1879 – August 22, 1941)
- Hashida Sugako (1925–2021)
- Hashimoto Shinkichi (December 24, 1882 – January 30, 1945)
- Hayama Yoshiki (March 12, 1894 – October 18, 1945)
- Hayami Yuji (born 1961)
- Hayao Miyazaki (born 1941)
- Hayashi Fumiko (1903 or 1904 – June 28, 1951)
- Hayashi Fubo (1900–1935)
- Hayashi Fusao (May 30, 1903 – October 9, 1975)
- Higashino Keigo (born February 4, 1958)
- Higuchi Ichiyō (May 2, 1872 – November 23, 1896)
- Himuro Saeko (January 11, 1957 – June 6, 2008)
- Hinatsu Konosuke (February 22, 1890 – June 13, 1971)
- Hino Ashihei (January 25, 1907 – January 24, 1960)
- Hirabayashi Taiko (1905–1971)
- Hiraide Shu (April 3, 1878 – March 17, 1914)
- Hiraiwa Yumie (1932–2023)
- Hirotsu Kazuo (December 5, 1891 – September 21, 1968)
- Hirotsu Ryurō (July 15, 1861 – October 15, 1928)
- Hisao Juran (April 6, 1902 – October 6, 1957)
- Hojo Hideji (1902 – May 19, 1996)
- Hori Akira (born 1944)
- Hori Tatsuo (December 28, 1904 – May 28, 1953)
- Horiguchi Daigaku (January 8, 1892 – March 15, 1981)
- Hosaka Kazushi (born 1956)
- Hoshi Shinichi (September 6, 1926 – December 30, 1997)
- Hoshino Tatsuko (November 15, 1903 – March 3, 1984)
- Hoshino Tenchi (1862–1950)
