= List of Japanese writers: K =

The following is a list of Japanese writers whose family name begins with the letter K

List by Family Name: A - B - C - D - E - F - G - H - I - J - K - M - N - O - R - S - T - U - W - Y - Z
- Kaga Otohiko (1929–2023)
- Kagawa Toyohiko (July 10, 1888 - April 23, 1960)
- Kaiko Takeshi (December 30, 1930 – December 9, 1989)
- Kaionji Chogoro (November 5, 1901 – December 1, 1977)
- Kajii Motojirō (February 17, 1901 – March 24, 1932)
- Kajio Shinji (born December 24, 1947)
- Ikki Kajiwara (September 4, 1936 – January 21, 1987)
- Kajiyama Toshiyuki (1930–1975)
- Kakinomoto no Hitomaro (c. 662 – 710)
- Kazuma Kamachi
- Kambara Ariake (March 15, 1876 – February 3, 1952)
- Kambayashi Chōhei (born 1953)
- Kamo no Chōmei (1155–1216)
- Kanagaki Robun (January 6, 1829 – November 8, 1894)
- Kanai Mieko (born 1947)
- Kanbe Musashi (born January 16, 1948)
- Hitomi Kanehara (born 1983)
- Kaneko Misuzu (April 11, 1903 – March 10, 1930)
- Kaneko Mitsuharu (1895–1975)
- Karai Senryu (1718–1790)
- Kasai Zenzo (1887–1928)
- Noburu Katagami (1884–1928)
- Katayama Kyoichi (born 1959)
- Masato Kato (born 1963)
- Kawabata Yasunari (June 14, 1899 – April 16, 1972)
- Kawada Jun
- Kawaguchi Matsutaro (1899–1985)
- Kawai Sora (1649–1710)
- Kawaji Ryuko (1888–1959)
- Kawakami Hiromi (born April 1, 1958)
- Kawakami Kikuko (February 9, 1904 – October 26, 1985)
- Kawakami Kiyoshi (1873–1949)
- Kawakami Minoru (born 1975)
- Kawamata Chiaki (born December 4, 1948)
- Kawatake Mokuami (February 3, 1816 – January 22, 1893)
- Kazuki Sakuraba (born 1971)
- Kikai Hiroh (1945–2020)
- Kikuchi Kan (December 26, 1888 – March 6, 1948)
- Kikuoka Kuri (1909–1970)
- Ki no Tsurayuki (870–945)
- Kimino Rinko
- Kinoshita Junji (1914–2006)
- Kinoshita Mokutaro (August 1, 1885 – October 15, 1945)
- Kinoshita Rigen (1886–1925)
- Kirino Natsuo (October 7, 1951)
- Kishi Yusuke (born 1959)
- Eriko Kishida (January 5, 1929 - April 7, 2011)
- Kyōko Kishida (April 29, 1930 – December 17, 2006)
- Rio Kishida (1950–2003), playwright
- Kita Ikki (April 3, 1883 – August 19, 1937)
- Kita Morio (1927–2011)
- Kitabatake Chikafusa (1293–1354)
- Kitabatake Yaho (1903–1982)
- Kitahara Hakushu (January 25, 1885 – November 2, 1942)
- Kitakata Kenzo (born October 26, 1947)
- Kitamura Kaoru (born December 28, 1949)
- Kitamura Tokoku (December 29, 1868 – May 16, 1894)
- Kiuchi Kazuhiro (born September 14, 1960)
- Kobayashi Hideo (April 11, 1902 – March 1, 1983)
- Kobayashi Issa (June 15, 1763 – January 5, 1828)
- Kobayashi Takiji (October 13, 1903 – February 20, 1933)
- Koda Aya (1904–1990)
- Kōda Rohan (July 23, 1867 – July 30, 1947)
- Kogyoku Izuki (born 1984)
- Koizumi Yakumo (June 27, 1850 – September 26, 1904)
- Kojima Masajiro (1894–1984)
- Kojima Nobuo (February 28, 1915 – October 26, 2006)
- Kojima Usui (December 29, 1873 – December 13, 1948)
- Kokan Shiren (1278–1347)
- Komaki Omi (May 11, 1894 – October 29, 1952)
- Komatsu Sakyo (1931–2011)
- Kon Hidemi (November 6, 1903 – July 30, 1984)
- Chiaki J. Konaka (born April 4, 1961)
- Kondo Marie (born c. 1985)
- Kondo Yoji (1933–2017)
- Kono Tensei (January 27, 1935 – January 29, 2012)
- Koshiba Hiroshi (November 9, 1884 – June 19, 1925)
- Kosugi Tengai (November 7, 1865 – September 1, 1952)
- Koushun Takami (born January 10, 1969)
- Kubota Mantaro (November 11, 1889 – May 6, 1963)
- Kume Masao (November 23, 1891 – March 1, 1952)
- Kunikida Doppo (July 15, 1871 – June 23, 1908)
- Kurata Hyakuzo (23 February 1891 – 12 February 1943)
- Kurimoto Kaoru (February 13, 1953 – May 26, 2009)
- Kuriyakawa Hakuson (1880–1923)
- Kuroda Seiki (June 29, 1866 – July 15, 1924)
- Kuronuma Ken (1902–1985)
- Kuroshima Denji (December 12, 1898 – October 17, 1943)
- Kurumizawa Koshi (26 April 1925 – 23 May 1994)
- Kyogoku Natsuhiko (born 1963)
- Kyokutei Bakin (1767–1848)
