= List of Japanese writers: S =

The following is a list of Japanese writers whose family name begins with the letter S.

List by Family Name: A - B - C - D - E - F - G - H - I - J - K - M - N - O - R - S - T - U - W - Y - Z
- Saigyō (1118–1190)
- Saitō Mokichi (1882–1953)
- Saitō Ryokuu (1868–1904)
- Saitō Sakae (1933–2024)
- Sakaguchi Ango (1906–1955)
- Saotome Mitsugu (1926–2008)
- Sasaki Nobutsuna
- Sata Ineko (1904–1998)
- Satō Aiko (1923–2026)
- Sei Shōnagon
- Seii James Allen Kōichi Moriwaki
- Senge Motomaro (1888–1948)
- Shiba Ryōtarō (1923–1996)
- Shibusawa Tatsuhiko (1928–1987)
- Shiga Mitsuko (1885–1956)
- Shiga Naoya (1883–1971)
- Shimada Masahiko (born 1961)
- Shimaki Kensaku (1903–1945)
- Shimao Toshio (1917–1986)
- Shimazaki Tōson (1872–1943)
- Shimizu Motoyoshi (1918–2008)
- Shimizu Satomu (see Yamamoto Shūgorō)
- Shimizu Shikin (1868–1933)
- Shimizu Yoshinori (born 1947)
- Shiono Nanami (born 1937)
- Shiraki Shizu (1895–1918)
- Shōno Junzō (1921–2009)
- Sono Ayako (1931–2025)
- Sonoike Kin'yuki (1886–1974)
- Suematsu Kenchō (1855–1920)
- SunSunSun (born 1993)
- Suzuki Kōji (1957–2026)
- Suzuki Miekichi (1882–1936)
- Suzuki Hiromi (dates unknown)
