= List of Japanese writers: M =

The following is a list of Japanese writers whose family name begins with the letter M

List by Family Name: A - B - C - D - E - F - G - H - I - J - K - M - N - O - R - S - T - U - W - Y - Z
- Mafune Yutaka (1902–1977)
- Maijō Ōtarō (born 1973)
- Maruya Saiichi (1925–2012)
- Maruyama Kenji (born 1943)
- Masaki Gorō (born 1957)
- Masaoka Shiki (September 17, 1867 – September 19, 1902)
- Matsuo Bashō (1644–1694): haiku
- Matsumoto Seicho (December 21, 1909 – August 4, 1992)
- Matsunaga Enzo (April 26, 1895 – November 20, 1938)
- Mei Matsuoka (born 1981)
- Mayumura Taku (October 20, 1934 — November 3, 2019)
- Michitsuna no Haha (Late 10th century): Kagerō Nikki ("The Gossamer Years")
- Mieko Kawakami (born 1976)
- Mikumo Gakuto (born 1970)
- Minakami Takitaro (December 6, 1887 – March 23, 1940)
- Minakami Tsutomu (March 8, 1919 – September 8, 2004)
- Minakata Kumagusu (April 15, 1867 – December 29, 1941)
- Mishima Sosen (July 30, 1876 – March 7, 1934)
- Mishima Yukio (1925–1970)
- Mita Munesuke (1937–2022)
- Mitsuse Ryu (March 18, 1928 – July 7, 1999)
- Miyabe Miyuki (born December 23, 1960)
- Miyamoto Teru (born 1947)
- Miyamoto Yuriko (February 13, 1899 – January 21, 1951)
- Miyazawa Kenji (August 27, 1896 – September 21, 1933)
- Miyoshi Tatsuji (August 23, 1900 – April 5, 1964)
- Mizumura Minae (born 1951)
- Mori Hiroshi (born December 7, 1957)
- Mori Ōgai (February 17, 1862 – July 9, 1922)
- Morimura Seiichi (January 2, 1933 – July 24, 2023)
- Morioka Hiroyuki (born March 2, 1962)
- Morita Sohei (March 19, 1881 – December 14, 1949)
- Morita Tama (December 19, 1894 – October 31, 1970)
- Motoori Norinaga (June 21, 1730 – November 5, 1801)
- Mukai Kyorai (1651–1704): haiku
- Mukoda Kuniko (November 28, 1929 – August 22, 1981)
- Murakami Haruki (born January 12, 1949)
- Murakami Ryu (born February 19, 1952)
- Muramatsu Shofu (September 21, 1889 – February 13, 1961)
- Murasaki Shikibu (c. 973 – c. 1025): The Tale of Genji (Genji Monogatari)
- Murayama Kaita (September 15, 1896 – February 20, 1919)
- Murayama Tomoyoshi (January 18, 1901 – March 22, 1977)
- Mushanokoji Saneatsu (May 12, 1885 – April 9, 1976)
