= Hirotsu =

Hirotsu is a Japanese surname. Notable people with the surname include:

- Eiji Hirotsu (born 1967), Japanese rugby union player
- Kazuo Hirotsu (1891–1968), Japanese novelist, literary critic and translator
- Momoko Hirotsu (1918–1988), Japanese novelist
- Motoko Hirotsu (born 1953), Japanese politician
- Ryūrō Hirotsu, also Hirotsu Ryūrō (1861–1928), Japanese novelist
