= List of Japanese writers: Y =

The following is a list of Japanese writers whose family name begins with the letter Y

List by Family Name: A - B - C - D - E - F - G - H - I - J - K - M - N - O - R - S - T - U - W - Y - Z
- Yagi Jukichi (February 9, 1898 – October 26, 1927)
- Yamabe no Akahito (700–730)
- Yamada Bimyo (July 8, 1868 – October 24, 1910)
- Yamada Amy (born 1959)
- Yamada Futaro (January 4, 1922 – July 28, 2001)
- Yamagata Hiroo (born 1964)
- Yamaguchi Hitomi (November 3, 1923 – August 30, 1995)
- Yamamoto Shugoro (June 22, 1903 – February 14, 1967)
- Yamamura Bocho (1884–1924)
- Yamanoue no Okura (660–733)
- Yamazaki Hodai (1914 - August 19, 1985)
- Yamazaki Nao-Cola (September 15, 1978)
- Yamazaki Sokan (1465–1553)
- Yamasaki Toyoko (November 3, 1924 – September 29, 2013)
- Yano Tetsu (December 10, 1923 – October 13, 2004)
- Yokomitsu Riichi (March 17, 1898 – December 30, 1947)
- Yokomizo Seishi (May 24, 1902 – December 28, 1981)
- Yokota Jun'ya (November 11, 1945 - January 4, 2019)
- Yosa Buson (1716–1783)
- Yosano Akiko (December 7, 1878 – May 29, 1942)
- Yosano Tekkan (February 26, 1873 – March 26, 1935)
- Yoshida Kenko (1283 – c. 1350)
- Yoshida Ken'ichi (1912–1977)
- Yoshida Hidekazu (1913–2012)
- Yoshida Sunao (1969 – July 15, 2004)
- Yoshida Takuro (born 1946)
- Yoshikawa Eiji (August 11, 1892 – September 7, 1962)
- Yoshii Isamu (October 8, 1886 – November 9, 1960)
- Yoshiko Miya (1945–2015)
- Yoshimoto Banana (born 1964)
- Yoshimoto Takaaki (1924–2016)
- Yoshino Hideo(July 3, 1902 – July 13, 1967)
- Yoshiya Nobuko January 12, 1896 – July 11, 1973
- Yoshiyuki Junnosuke (April 1, 1923 – July 26, 1994)
- Yoshiyuki Tomino (born 1941)
- Yuasa Yoshiko (1896–1990)
- Yujiro (born 1974)
- Yumeno Kyusaku (January 4, 1889 – March 11, 1936)
- Yumemakura Baku (born 1951)
- Yumiko Kurahashi (October 10, 1935 – June 10, 2005)
- Yu Miri (born June 22, 1968)
- Yusuke Kishi (born 1959)
