= List of Japanese writers: O =

The following is a list of Japanese writers whose family name begins with the letter O

List by Family Name: A - B - C - D - E - F - G - H - I - J - K - M - N - O - R - S - T - U - W - Y - Z
- Oda Sakunosuke (October 26, 1913 – January 10, 1947)
- Oe Kenzaburo (January 31, 1935 - March 3, 2023)
- Ogawa Yoko (born 1962)
- Ogiwara Seisensui (1884–1976)
- Oguri Mushitaro (March 14, 1901 – February 10, 1946)
- Okakura Kakuzo (December 26, 1862 – September 2, 1913)
- Okamoto Kanoko (March 1, 1889 – February 18, 1939)
- Okamoto Kido (October 15, 1872 – March 1, 1939)
- Omae Ao (born November 28, 1992)
- Ono Fuyumi (born 1960)
- Ono no Komachi (c. 825 – c. 900)
- Ooka Makoto (1931–2017)
- Ooka Shohei (March 6, 1909 – December 25, 1988)
- Orikuchi Shinobu (February 11, 1887 – September 3, 1953)
- Osanai Kaoru (July 26, 1881 – December 25, 1928)
- Oshikawa Shunro (March 21, 1876 – November 16, 1914)
- Ota Mizuho (1872–1963)
- Otomo no Yakamochi (c. 718 – 785)
- Ozaki Hosai (January 20, 1885 – April 7, 1926)
- Ozaki Kihachi (1892–1974)
- Ozaki Koyo (January 10, 1867 – October 30, 1903)
