= 1888 in poetry =

This article covers 1888 in poetry. Nationality words link to articles with information on the nation's poetry or literature (for instance, Irish or France).

== Events ==
- June 3 – American writer Ernest Thayer's baseball poem "Casey at the Bat" is first published (under the pen name "Phin") as the last of his humorous contributions to The San Francisco Examiner.

== Works published ==
=== Canada ===
- William Wilfred Campbell, Snowflakes and sunbeams. St. Stephen, NB: St. Croix Courier Press. Published at author's expense.
- Archibald Lampman, Among the Millet. His first book of poems, including "Heat". Published at author's expense.
- Frederick George Scott, The Soul's Quest, and Other Poems.

=== United Kingdom ===
- William Allingham, Flower Pieces, and Other Poems, illustrated by Dante Gabriel Rossetti
- Sir Edwin Arnold, translator from the Persian by Sa'di, With Sa'di in the Garden; or, The Book of Love
- Matthew Arnold, Essays in Criticism, Second Series (see also Essays in Criticism 1865, 1910)
- W. E. Henley, A Book of Verses
- Andrew Lang, Grass of Parnassus
- George Meredith, A Reading of Earth
- T. W. Rolleston, Poems and Ballads of Young Ireland
- William Wordsworth, The Recluse, printed from the original manuscript; Wordsworth's plan was to write a long autobiographical poem of three parts and a prelude (see also The Excursion 1814 and The Prelude 1850) posthumously published

=== United States ===
- Danske Dandridge, Joy and Other Poems
- Oliver Wendell Holmes, Before the Curfew and Other Poems
- James Russell Lowell:
  - The English Poets; Lessing, Rousseau, nonfiction
  - Heartsease and Rue
- Herman Melville, John Marr and Other Sailors
- Thomas Nelson Page and A. C. Gordon, Befo' de War
- James Whitcomb Riley:
  - Pipes o' Pan at Zekesbury
  - Old-Fashioned Roses
- Ernest Thayer, "Casey at the Bat"
- Walt Whitman, November Boughs

=== Other ===
- Rubén Darío, Azul
- James Russell Lowell, Heartsease and Rue
- Władysław Mickiewicz, Adam Mickiewicz, sa vie et son œuvre ("Adam Mickiewicz: His Life and Works"), biography written by and collected works edited by the author's son, translated from the original Polish into French, Paris
- I. L. Peretz, "Monish", Polish poet writing in Yiddish
- Andrejs Pumpurs, Lāčplēsis ("The Bear-Slayer"), Latvia

== Births ==
Death years link to the corresponding "[year] in poetry" article:

- January 5 – Rosa Zagnoni Marinoni (died 1970), Italian-born American poet
- February 8 – Giuseppe Ungaretti (died 1970), Egyptian-born Italian modernist poet and writer
- February 13 – Desmond FitzGerald (born 1947), English-born Irish revolutionary, poet, publicist and politician
- March 26 – F. W. Harvey (died 1957), English rural poet and soldier
- March 30 – Julian Grenfell (died of wounds 1915), English soldier and poet
- April 6 – Dan Andersson (died 1920), Swedish poet
- April 30 – John Crowe Ransom (died 1974), American poet, essayist, social and political theorist and academic
- June 8 – Senge Motomaro 千家元麿 (died 1948), Japanese, Taishō and Shōwa period poet (surname: Senge)
- June 13 – Fernando Pessoa (died 1935), Portuguese heteronymic poet, writer, critic, translator, publisher and philosopher
- June 22 – Alan Seeger (killed in action 1916), American poet
- August 1 – Aline Kilmer, born Aline Murray (died 1941), American poet, children's book author and essayist; wife of Joyce Kilmer
- September 26 – T. S. Eliot (died 1965), American-born English poet, playwright, editor, critic and writer
- October 1 – Ryuko Kawaji 川路柳虹, pen-name of Kawaki Makoto (died 1959), Japanese, Shōwa period poet and literary critic (surname: Kawaji)
- October 14 – Katherine Mansfield (died 1923), New Zealand modernist poet and short story writer
- October 16 – Eugene O'Neill (died 1953), American playwright
- October 19 – Venkatarama Ramalingam Pillai (died 1972), Indian Tamil-language poet and freedom fighter
- date not known – Nilkanth Sharma Dal (died 1970), Indian, Kashmiri-language poet

== Deaths ==
Birth years link to the corresponding "[year] in poetry" article:

- February 28 (last seen alive) - Black Bart (born 1829), American gentleman stagecoach robber and versifier
- April 15 - Matthew Arnold (born 1822), English poet and critic
- May 12 - Edward Lear (born 1812), English comic poet
- July 30 - María Josefa Mujía (born 1812), blind Bolivian poet
- August 9 - Charles Cros (born 1842), French poet and inventor

== See also ==
- 19th century in poetry
- 19th century in literature
- List of years in poetry
- List of years in literature
- Victorian literature
- French literature of the 19th century
- Symbolist poetry
- Poetry
