= List of Japanese writers: T =

The following is a list of Japanese writers whose family name begins with the letter T

List by Family Name: A - B - C - D - E - F - G - H - I - J - K - M - N - O - R - S - T - U - W - Y - Z
- Tachihara Masaaki (January 21, 1926 – August 12, 1980)
- Tachihara Michizō (July 30, 1914 – March 29, 1939)
- Tada Chimako (April 1, 1930 – January 23, 2003)
- Taguchi Ukichi (1855–1905)
- Takagi Akimitsu (September 25, 1920 – September 9, 1995)
- Takahama Kyoshi (February 22, 1874 – April 8, 1959)
- Takahashi Genichiro (born 1951)
- Takahashi Kazumi (1931–1971)
- Takahashi Motokichi (1893–1965)
- Takahashi Mutsuo (born December 15, 1937)
- Takahashi Takako (1932–2013)
- Takami Jun (January 30, 1907 – August 17, 1965)
- Takami Koushun (born 1960)
- Takamura Kotaro (March 13, 1883 – April 2, 1956)
- Takano Tsugi (August 15, 1890 – March 19, 1943)
- Takayama Chogyu (February 28, 1871 – December 24, 1902)
- Takemoto Novala (born 1968)
- Takeyama Michio (July 17, 1903 – June 15, 1984)
- Tamura Ryuichi (1923–1998)
- Tamura Taijiro (1911–1983)
- Tamura Toshiko (1884–1945)
- Tanaka Hidemitsu (January 10, 1913 – November 3, 1949)
- Tanaka Jun (1890–1960)
- Tanaka Yoshiki (born 1952)
- Taneda Santoka (December 3, 1882 – October 11, 1940)
- Tanemura Suehiro (March 21, 1933 – August 29, 2004)
- Tanigawa Nagaru (born 1970)
- Tanikawa Shuntaro (1931–2024)
- Tanizaki Junichiro (1886–1965)
- Tatsuhiko Takimoto (born 1978)
- Tawada Yoko (born 1960)
- Tawara Machi (born 1962)
- Tayama Katai (January 22, 1872 – May 13, 1930)
- Terada Kenji (born 1952)
- Terada Torahiko (November 28, 1878 – December 31, 1935)
- Terayama Shuji (December 10, 1935 – May 4, 1983)
- Tokai Sanshi (December 2, 1852 – September 25, 1922)
- Tokuda Shusei (December 23, 1871 – November 18, 1943)
- Tokutomi Roka (October 25, 1868 – September 18, 1927)
- Tomioka Makoto (January 1, 1897 – October 15, 1926)
- Tow Ubukata (born 1977)
- Tsubouchi Shoyo (May 22, 1859 – February 28, 1935)
- Tsuji Jun (October 4, 1884 – November 24, 1944)
- Tsuji Kunio (September 24, 1925 – July 29, 1999)
- Tsunku (born 1968)
- Tsunashima Ryosen (May 27, 1873 – September 14, 1907)
- Tsutsui Yasutaka (born 1934)
