= List of Japanese writers: A =

The following is a list of Japanese writers whose family name begins with the letter A

List by Family Name: A - B - C - D - E - F - G - H - I - J - K - M - N - O - R - S - T - U - W - Y - Z
- Abe Akira (1934–1989)
- Abe Kobo (1924–1993)
- Abe Kazushige (born 1968)
- Abe no Nakamaro (698–770)
- Abe Tomoji (1903–1973)
- Aeba Koson (August 15, 1855 – June 20, 1922)
- Agawa Hiroyuki (1920–2015)
- Aikawa Sho (born 1965)
- Aizu Yaichi (August 1, 1881 – November 21, 1956)
- Akae Baku (1933–2012)
- Akagawa Jiro (born 1948)
- Akahori Satoru (born 1965)
- Akazome Emon (956–1041)
- Akiyama Mizuhito (born 1971)
- Akiyuki Nosaka (October 10, 1930 – December 9, 2015)
- Akutagawa Ryūnosuke (March 1, 1892 – July 24, 1927)
- Anrakuan Sakuden (1544–1642)
- Anzai Atsuko (born 1929)
- Anzai Fuyue (March 9, 1898 – August 24, 1965)
- Arai Hakuseki (1657–1725)
- Arai Motoko (born 1960)
- Araki Toichiro (1895–1977)
- Arishima Ikuma (November 26, 1882 – September 15, 1960)
- Arishima Takeo (March 4, 1878 – June 9, 1923)
- Ariyoshi Sawako (January 20, 1931 – August 30, 1984)
- Asada Jiro (born 1951)
- Ashibe Taku (born 1958)
- Asai Ryoi (c. 1612 – 1691)
- Ayatsuji Yukito (born 1960)
- Ayukawa Tetsuya (1919–2002)
