= Kosugi Tengai =

- 小杉天外
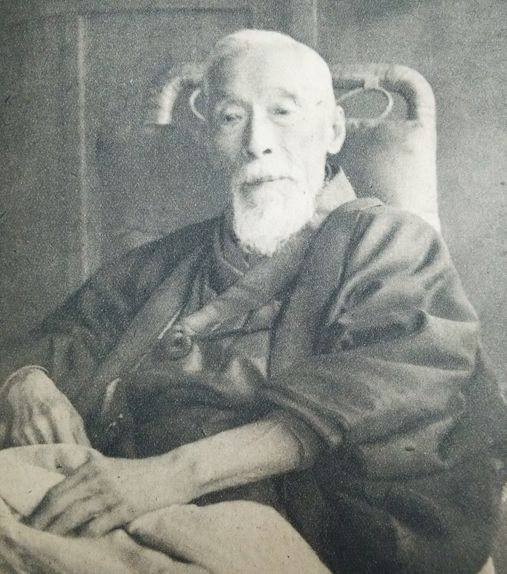
- Kosugi Tengai
- Born: 7 November 1865; Misato, Akita, Japan
- Died: 1 September 1952 (aged 86); Kamakura, Japan
- Resting place: Kenchō-ji, Kamakura, Japan
- Education: Chuo University
- Occupations: Writer and literary critic
- Writing career
- Language: Japanese
- Genres: novels, literary criticism, short stories

Kosugi Tamezō (小杉 為蔵, November 7, 1865 – September 1, 1952), known by his pen name Kosugi Tengai (小杉 天外), was a Japanese novelist of the Meiji, Taishō and Shōwa eras. He is considered the founder of the naturalism movement in modern Japanese literature.

== Biography ==
Kosugi was born in what is now Misato, Akita Prefecture. He moved to Tokyo in 1886 to attend the English Law College (the forerunner of Chuo University, but soon dropped out to devote himself to writing full-time. The start of his career was hardly auspicious. When he brought a sample of his writing to Mori Ōgai, he was encouraged to “look for another profession”. Undeterred, he visited Ozaki Kōyō, who confided to Izumi Kyōka that Kosugi would “never realize his ambition” to become a novelist. However, in 1890, Kosugi became a disciple of literary critic and satirical author Saitō Ryokuu, and began writing political novels under Saitō’s direction.

He was hired by the literary magazine Shincho gekan in 1897, but was transferred by the magazine to the newspaper Hōchi Shimbun.

He published his first novel, Hatsu Sugata (初すがた, First Appearance), a story about a geisha and her relationship with men from different social strata in 1900. He followed with a sequel, Hayariuta, in 1902, which was one of his most successful works. Kosugi attempted to write in a realistic and objective manner, without intruding the thoughts or comments of the author into the story narrative, which was considered rather revolutionary for the time. In the forward to Hatsu su gata, he commented that he "seeks to move the reader not by the unusual, but by what is normal and average.". Familiar with Zola and other French authors, his experimentation towards realism is considered a forerunner of a Japanese style of naturalism. Although often compared to his contemporary, Nagai Kafū, Kosugi has been criticized for having two-dimensional characters who meet predictable fates based on family or environmental situations.

Kosugi was elected to the Japan Art Academy in 1948. In his later years, he also turned towards the genre of historical fiction.

His grave is at the sub-temple of Myōkō-in, at Kenchō-ji in Kamakura.

Hatsu Sugata (初すがた, First Appearance) was made into a movie and released on March 5, 1936 in Japan. It starred Ichiro Tsukita and Chiyoko Okura and was directed by Japan's first female director, Tazuko Sakane.

== See also ==
- List of Japanese authors
