= Kikuko Kawakami =

Japanese writer (1904–1985)

- Born: 9 February 1904; Shizuoka, Japan
- Died: 26 October 1985 (aged 81); Kamakura, Kanagawa, Japan
- Occupation: writer
- Writing career
- Genres: novels, poetry

Kikuko Kawakami (川上 喜久子, Kawakami Kikuko; 9 February 1904 – 26 October 1985) was a Japanese writer active during the Shōwa period of Japan. Her maiden name was Shinoda Kikuko.

== Biography ==
Kawakami Kikuko was born in Shizuoka Prefecture. She graduated from Heijo Higher Girls' School and from the vocational course at Yamawaki Higher Girls’ School. In 1924 she accompanied her husband to Korea, then under Japanese rule, and lived there until 1931.

In 1927, the Osaka Asahi Shimbun awarded her a prize for her novel, Aru Minikui Biganjutsu-shi ("An Ugly Beautician"), which it then ran as a serialized novel in the newspaper.

After her return to Japan in 1931, she and her retired husband moved to Kamakura, Kanagawa prefecture, so that she could receive medical treatment for an illness contracted in Korea.

In 1942, she visited the Philippines to report on field propaganda efforts and to tour the islands. She returned in 1943.

She continued to live in Kamakura until her death in 1985.

While living in Kamakura, she had the opportunity to make the acquaintance of some of the Kamakura literati, including Hayashi Fusao, Kawabata Yasunari and Yosano Akiko (who taught her tanka). Some of her poems were accepted by the literary journal Myōjō.

In 1936, Kawakami published Fuyubi no Kage (Shadow of a Winter's Day), Saigetsu (Time and Tide), and Metsubo no Mon (Gate of Ruin) in Bungakukai, a Japanese monthly literary magazine. All three stories were acclaimed by literary critics, and Metsubo no Mon was awarded the eleventh Bungakukai Prize, and was nominated for the 4th Akutagawa Prize.

Following this recognition, Kawakami wrote a number of novels in quick succession, including Hikari Honokanari ("Faint Light"), Biko ("Dim Light"), and Hanazono no Shosoku, published in Bungakukai. Her style was objective and unemotional, and she depicted the ever-increasing oppression under Japan's growing militarism.

After World War II, Kawakami withdrew from literary activity, but in her later years published Kagero no Banka ("Elegy on Mirage").

== See also ==
- Japanese literature
- List of Japanese authors
