= Ozaki Kihachi =

Japanese poet

- Ozaki Kihachi
- Born: 31 January 1892; Tokyo, Japan
- Died: 4 February 1974 (aged 82); Kamakura, Kanagawa, Japan
- Occupation: Japanese poet
- Writing career
- Genre: poetry

Ozaki Kihachi (尾崎 喜八; 31 January 1892 – 4 February 1974) was a Japanese poet active during the Shōwa period of Japan.

== Biography ==
Ozaki was born in the Kyobashi neighborhood of Tokyo (now part of Chūō, Tokyo). He attended the Keika Shogyo School, where he learned the English language and developed an interest in anthologies of English poetry. In 1911, he came to the attention of poet and sculptor, Takamura Kōtarō, who encouraged his fledgling literary efforts.

While working as an employee of a company, Ozaki translated English poetry as a hobby, and submitted these translations together with his own original works to the literary magazine, Shirakaba (“White Birch”). In 1922, he published his first anthology, Sora to Jumoku (“Sky and Trees”). As a follower of the Shirakaba philosophy of humanism, he became close friends with Mushanokōji Saneatsu and Senge Motomaro. He was also fond of travel and mountaineering.

Ozaki later taught himself French and German, and was greatly influenced by writers such as Romain Rolland and Hermann Hesse.

His later works include Takamura Shisho ("Takamura Anthology") and Hana Sakeru Kodoku (“Flowering Loneliness”). Ozaki also published Yama no Ehon (“Mountain Picture Book”) a collection of miscellaneous thoughts, and many translations of Romain Rolland, Hermann Hesse, Rainer Maria Rilke, Maurice Maeterlinck and Georges Duhamel.

From 1946 to 1954, he lived in a cottage in the mountains of Fujimi Kogen in Nagano Prefecture, and left numerous works in which he praised the beauty of nature and rural life.

Ozaki died in 1974 at the age of 82. His grave is at the temple of Meigetsu-in in Kamakura, Kanagawa, the city where he lived from 1966 to his death.

== See also ==
- Japanese literature
- Japanese poetry
- List of Japanese authors
