= Zenzō =

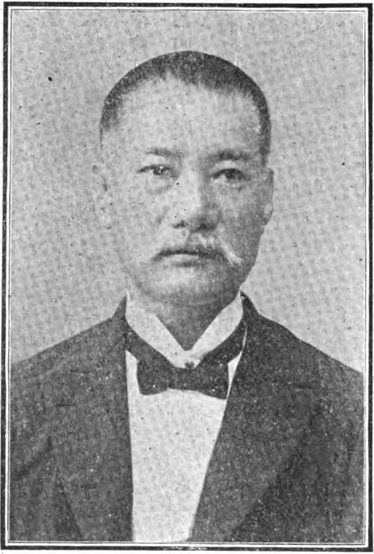
- Zenzo Yabe (1852–1910), Japanese educator
- Pronunciation: dzeNdzoɯ (IPA)
- Gender: Male

Origin
- Origin: Japanese
- Meaning: Different meanings depending on the kanji used

Other names
- Alternative spelling: Zenzo (Kunrei-shiki) Zenzo (Nihon-shiki) Zenzō, Zenzo, Zenzou (Hepburn)

Zenzō, Zenzo or Zenzou is a masculine Japanese given name.

== Written forms ==
Zenzō can be written using different combinations of kanji characters. Here are some examples:

- 善三, "virtuous, three"
- 善蔵, "virtuous, store up"
- 善造, "virtuous, create"
- 全三, "all, three"
- 全蔵, "all, store up"
- 全造, "all, create"
- 然三, "so, three"
- 前三, "in front, three"

The name can also be written in hiragana ぜんぞう or katakana ゼンゾウ.

== Notable people with the name ==
- Zenzo Kasai (葛西 善蔵; 1887–1928), Japanese writer
- Zenzo Matsuyama (松山 善三; born 1925), Japanese film director and screenwriter
- Zenzo Shimizu (清水 善造; 1891–1977), Japanese tennis player
- Zenzo Yabe (矢部 善蔵, 1852–1910), Japanese educator

== Fictional characters ==
- Zenzo Hattori (服部 全蔵), a character in the anime and manga series Gintama
