= List of Japanese writers: I =

The following is a list of Japanese writers whose family name begins with the letter I

List by Family Name: A - B - C - D - E - F - G - H - I - J - K - M - N - O - R - S - T - U - W - Y - Z
- Ibuse Masuji (February 15, 1898 – July 10, 1993)
- Ido Reizan (1859–1935)
- Ihara Saikaku (1642–1693)
- Iida Dakotsu (April 26, 1885 – October 3, 1962)
- Ikenami Shotaro (January 25, 1923 – May 3, 1990)
- Ikezawa Natsuki (born 1945)
- Ikkyu (1394–1481)
- Inagaki Manjirō (September 26, 1861 – November 25, 1908)
- Inagaki Taruho (December 26, 1900 – October 25, 1977)
- Inoue Hisashi (1934–2010)
- Inoue Kenkabō (1870–1934)
- Inoue Yasushi (May 6, 1907 – January 29, 1991)
- Inui Kurumi (born 1963)
- Irokawa Takehiro (1929–1989)
- Isaka Kōtarō (born May 25, 1971)
- Lady Ise (c. 875 – c. 938)
- Ishibashi Ningetsu (September 1, 1865 – February 1, 1926)
- Ishida Ira (born March 8, 1960)
- Ishigaki Rin (February 21, 1920 – December 26, 2004)
- Ishiguro Kazuo (born November 8, 1954)
- Ishihara Fujio (born 1933)
- Ishihara Shintaro (1932–2022)
- Ishikawa Jun (March 7, 1899 – December 29, 1987)
- Ishikawa Takuboku (February 20, 1886 – April 13, 1912)
- Ishikawa Tatsuzo (July 2, 1905 – January 31, 1985)
- Ishizuka Tomoji (September 20, 1906 – February 8, 1986)
- Einosuke Itō (November 21, 1903 – July 26, 1959)
- Itō Hiromi (born September 13, 1955)
- Ito Junji (born 1963)
- Itō Keikaku (Project Itoh) (October 14, 1974 – March 20, 2009)
- Ito Noe (January 21, 1895 – September 16, 1923)
- Ito Sachio (August 18, 1864 – July 30, 1913)
- Ito Takami (born 1961)
- Itoyama Akiko (born 1966)
- Izawa Motohiko (born February 1, 1954)
- Izumi Kyōka (November 4, 1873 – September 7, 1939)
- Izumi Shikibu (c. 978 – c. 1034)
- Izumo no Okuni (c. 1572 – 1613)
