= Kensaku Shimaki =

Japanese writer (1903–1945)

Shimaki Kensaku
- Born: 7 September 1903; Sapporo Hokkaidō, Japan
- Died: 17 August 1945 (aged 41); Kamakura, Kanagawa, Japan
- Occupation: Writer

Kensaku Shimaki (島木 健作, Shimaki Kensaku; 7 September 1903 – 17 August 1945) was the pen name of Asakura Kikuo (朝倉 菊雄), a Japanese author active during the Shōwa period in Japan. He had an interest in leftist ideology and was arrested in 1928 due to his ties to the Japanese Communist Party. Throughout his literary career, Shimaki wrote multiple novels and stories with a common theme being proletariat life. Some of his works were published by magazines and journals. He associated with Nobel laureate Kawabata Yasunari.

== Early life ==
Shimaki was born in Sapporo, Hokkaidō in 1903. His father died when he was two years old, and he was raised by his mother. He was forced to drop out of elementary school in order to work to support his mother, and managed to continue his education by obtaining odd jobs at a local middle school and library.

== Life as a political radical ==
Shimaki entered Tohoku Imperial University in Sendai in 1925, but due to extreme poverty was barely able to support himself, and he contracted pulmonary tuberculosis. It was during this time that he was attracted to the radical labor movement. He left the university and joined a leftist agrarian movement in Shikoku. In 1927, this flirtation with socialism turned more radical when he signed on as active member of the Japan Communist Party.

When the communist movement was outlawed and forced underground, Shimaki was arrested in a nationwide round-up of communists (the March 15 incident of 1928), and was forced to renounce his communist beliefs in order to be released from prison. However, it appears that his political renunciation was not sincere, since he was again arrested in 1929, this time under the auspices of the Peace Preservation Law. Shimaki remained imprisoned until March 1932, when his tuberculosis worsened, and he was paroled for health reasons. He stayed for a while in the Hongō neighborhood of Tokyo with his brother (who ran a used bookstore) and he attempted to study English.

== Literary career ==
Although in his youth, Shimaki published a short-lived literary magazine called Kunugi no Mi ("Acorn", 1918), containing tanka poems and essays which he wrote under the pen-name of “Asakura Tengai”, his literary career did not begin in earnest until after he was released from prison the second time.

In 1934, Shimaki published his first work Rai ("Leprosy"), a serialized novel which appeared in the magazine Bungaku Hyōron (Literary Review). It was based on his experiences while in prison, and was critically well received. Shimaki followed this work with Mōmoku ("Blindness") in the literary journal Chūōkōron, which further established his position as a writer.

Shimaki lived in Kamakura, Kanagawa prefecture from 1937, and was part of a social and literary circle which included Kawabata Yasunari, Kobayashi Hideo and Takami Jun. However, his first novel, Saiken ("Reconstruction", 1937) was banned by government censors as it sympathetically depicted a man convicted for his left-wing convictions. Shimaki had intended to write a sequel, in which the man rejected Marxism, but never had the chance. Instead, he produced Seikatsu no tankyū ("Quest for Life", 1937), which was well received by the authorities, as it depicted people having a productive life despite difficult conditions during a national emergency.

He traveled to Manchukuo in 1939, and published a well-balanced travel story Manshū Kiko ("Manchurian Travelogue", 1939) of his visit, and somewhat surprisingly government censors did not react to his criticism of government policies in Manchukuo which adversely affected the lives of the Japanese colonists. Shimaki died of tuberculosis in 1945, only a couple of days after the surrender of Japan at the relatively young age of 41. Yasunari Kawabata read a eulogy at his funeral. His grave is at the temple of Jōchi-ji in Kamakura.

== See also ==
- Japanese literature
- List of Japanese authors
