= Hiraide =

Hiraide, Hirade (written: 平出) is a Japanese surname. Notable people with the surname include:

- Kazuya Hiraide (平出 和也, born 1979), Japanese ski mountaineer and mountain climber
- Ryo Hiraide (平出 涼, born 1991), Japanese footballer
- Hiraide Shū (平出 修, 1878–1914), Japanese writer, poet and lawyer
- Takashi Hiraide (平出 隆, born 1950), Japanese poet and critic
