= Shizu Shiraki =

Japanese writer

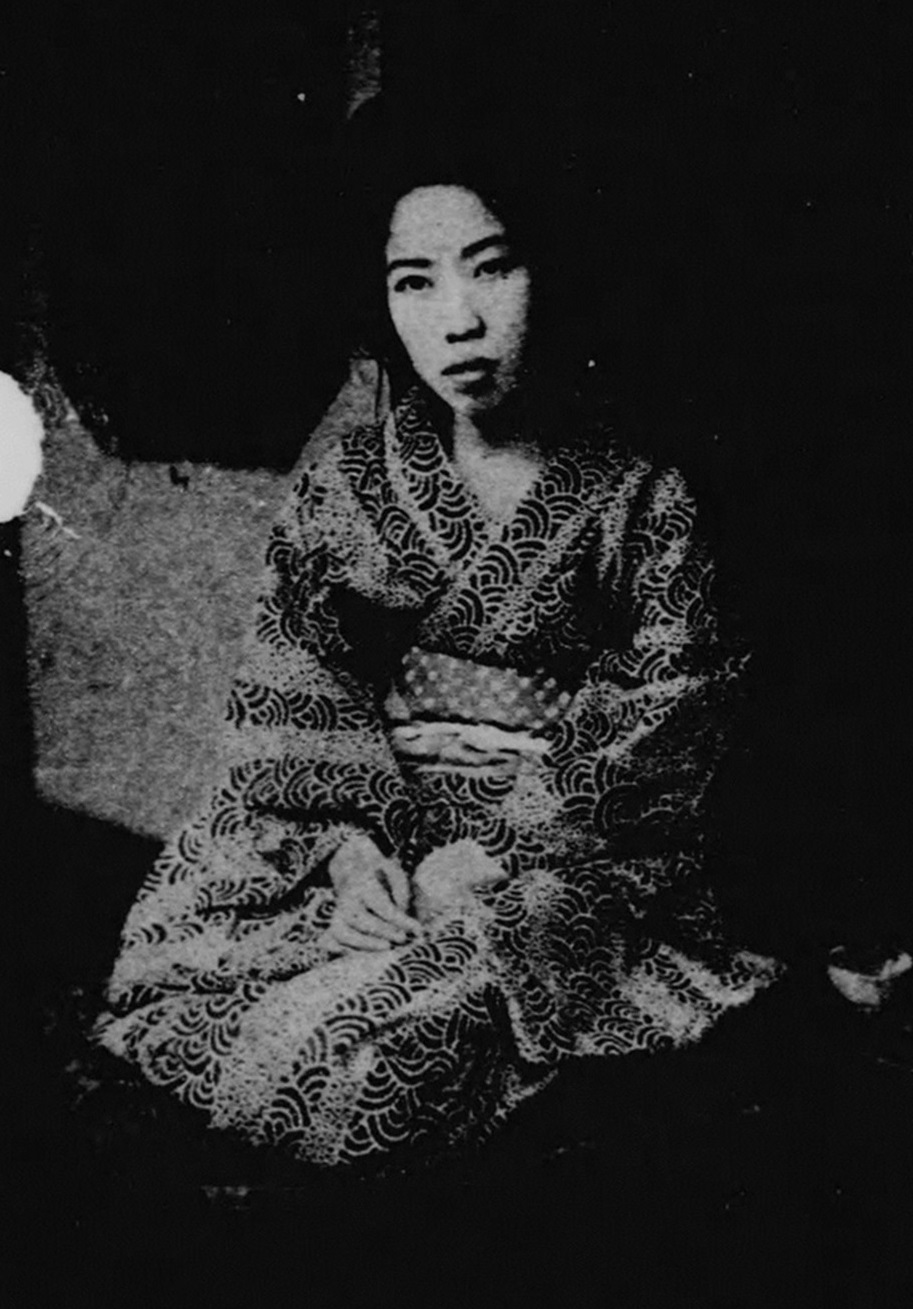

Shizu Shiraki (素木 しづ, Shiraki Shizu; March 26, 1895 – January 29, 1918) was a Japanese author.

== Early life and career ==
Shiraki contracted tuberculosis after middle school and had her leg amputated at age 17. After this, she took fiction writing lessons from Morita Sōhei, started writing, and wrote throughout the six years until her death.

== Style ==
According to scholar Barbara Hartley, Shiraki's willingness to write about body-related issues, such as menstruation, "marks her as singularly incisive and even subversive."

== See also ==
- Japanese literature
- List of Japanese authors
