= Daigaku Horiguchi =

Japanese poet and translator (1892–1981)

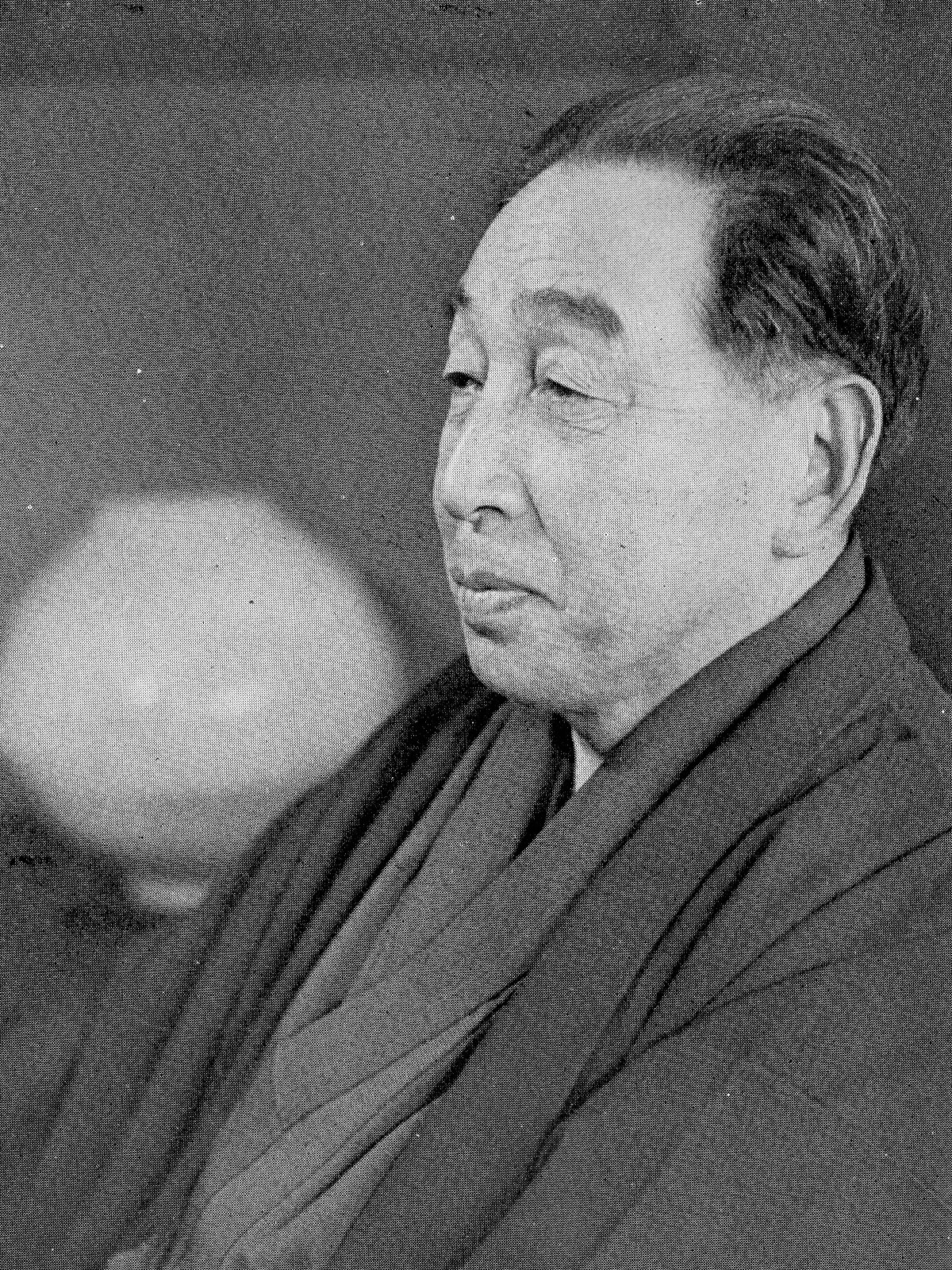
- Horiguchi in 1954
- Born: 8 January 1892; Tokyo, Japan
- Died: 15 March 1981 (aged 89); Hayama, Kanagawa, Japan
- Occupation: writer
- Writing career
- Genre: poetry

Daigaku Horiguchi (堀口 大学; 8 January 1892 – 15 March 1981) was a poet and translator of French literature in Taishō and Shōwa period Japan. He is credited with introducing French surrealism to Japanese poetry, and to translating the works of over 66 French authors into Japanese.

== Early life ==
Horiguchi was born in the Hongō neighborhood of Tokyo. His father, Horiguchi Kumaichi was the son of ex-samurai from Echigo and a career diplomat with the Foreign Ministry who was the Japanese consul at Incheon during the First Sino-Japanese War.

Horiguchi attended the Literature Department of Keio University, but never graduated (which is rather ironic, since his given name "Daigaku" is written with the same kanji as "university", and came from the fact that his father was still a student at Tokyo Imperial University when he was born). Even prior to entering the university, he was a member of the Shinshisha (The New Poetry Society) and contributing tanka poetry to Subaru (Pleiades) and other literary magazines, such as Mita Bungaku. Under the encouragement of Tekkan Yosano and his wife Akiko Yosano he also began to write other types of verse.

In 1911, Horiguchi left school to accompany his father on overseas postings and during the next 14 years overseas he became fluent in French (assisted by his Belgian stepmother) and interested in French literature, particularly the novels and poetry of the Symbolist movement. He first spent over a year in Mexico, where he was diagnosed with tuberculosis, causing Horiguchi to abandon his father's hope that he become a diplomat, and he devoted his time to writing verse and translation of French works instead. He was in Mexico during the Mexican Revolution, and it was also during this time that he was drawn to Parnassianism as a style of verse. In 1913, the family relocated to Belgium, via Siberia. While in Belgium, he studied the works of Paul Verlaine and the works of the Symbolist movement, including the works of Remy de Gourmont. He subsequently lived for brief periods in Spain, Paris, Brazil and Romania and maintained correspondence with Marie Laurencin and Thomas Mann, whose works he also translated while recuperating at a sanatorium in Switzerland.

== Pre-war career ==
In 1919, Horiguchi published his first anthology of verse, Gekko to Pierrot (Moonlight and Pierrot), and a book of waka verse, Pan no fue (Pan pipes). On returning to Japan in 1925, he brought out a collection of poems Gekka no ichigun, which introduced the Japanese literary world to the works of Jean Cocteau, Raymond Radiguet, Paul Verlaine, and Guillaume Apollinaire. This work greatly influenced modern Japanese poetry starting from the late 1920s and 1930s. In addition, his translation of Paul Morand's Ouvert la nuit (Yo hiraku; Night opens) had a strong impact on the Shinkankakuha, or the New Sensation School whose best-known exponent was Yokomitsu Riichi.

In 1928 he created his own poetry magazine, Pantheon, but its publication was discontinued the following year after he had a falling out with co-author Kōnosuke Hinatsu. He subsequently launched a new poetry magazine, Orpheon.

In 1932, Horiguchi moved to the Ishikawa neighborhood of Tokyo. In 1935, he became vice-chairman of the Japan PEN Club (the chairman at the time was Tōson Shimazaki), and in May of the same year entertained Jean Cocteau during his visit to Japan, by taking him to see kabuki. However, spoke out against the increasing militarization of Japan, and after promulgation of the National Mobilization Law, went into self-imposed confinement at a hotel on the shores of Lake Nojiri, continuing with his translations of French literature under the ever more vigilant eyes of the censors. In 1941, he was evacuated to Okitsu, Shizuoka, but returned briefly to Tokyo in 1942 to give a eulogy at the funeral of Akiko Yosano. He remained in Shizuoka until 1945, and moved briefly to Sekikawa, Niigata before the end of the war.

== Post-war career ==
Horiguchi moved back to Shizuoka at the end of World War II, and an anthology of five volumes of his poetry was published in 1947. From 1950, he moved to Hayama, Kanagawa, where he spent the remainder of his life. In 1957, he was made a member of the Japan Art Academy, and met with André Chamson, the president of PEN International who was visiting Japan, the same year. In 1959, one of his works was awarded the prestigious Yomiuri Prize. Over the next ten years, he was in demand as a guest speaker on modern Japanese poetry around the country. In 1967, his submission of poetry in the traditional Japanese style for the Utakai Hajime contest at the Imperial Palace on the topic of fish drew praise from Emperor Hirohito (an amateur marine biologist), and Horiguchi was awarded the 3rd class of the Order of the Sacred Treasures. In 1970, he became honorary chairman of the Japan Poetry Club, and in November of the same year was made a Person of Cultural Merit by the Japanese government. In 1973, he was awarded the 2nd class of the Order of the Sacred Treasures. In 1976 a limited edition collection of Horiguchi's poems, entitled "Tôten no Niji" ("Rainbow in the Eastern Sky"), was illustrated by noted modernist artist Hodaka Yoshida, who contributed seven signed and numbered prints to accompany the poems.

In 1979 he was awarded the Order of Culture by the Japanese government. Horiguchi died in March 1981 at the age of 89. His grave is at the Kamakura Reien cemetery.

During his career, Horiguchi published more than 20 books of poetry. His verses combined the flexibility of the Japanese style with hints of the resonance of the French language, and he was noted for making use of colloquial Japanese words in his translations to come closer to the original imagery, rather than attempting to force the translated poems into a more traditional Japanese format.

== See also ==
- Japanese literature
- List of Japanese authors
