= Fusao Hayashi =

Japanese novelist and literary critic (1903–1975)

Hayashi Fusao
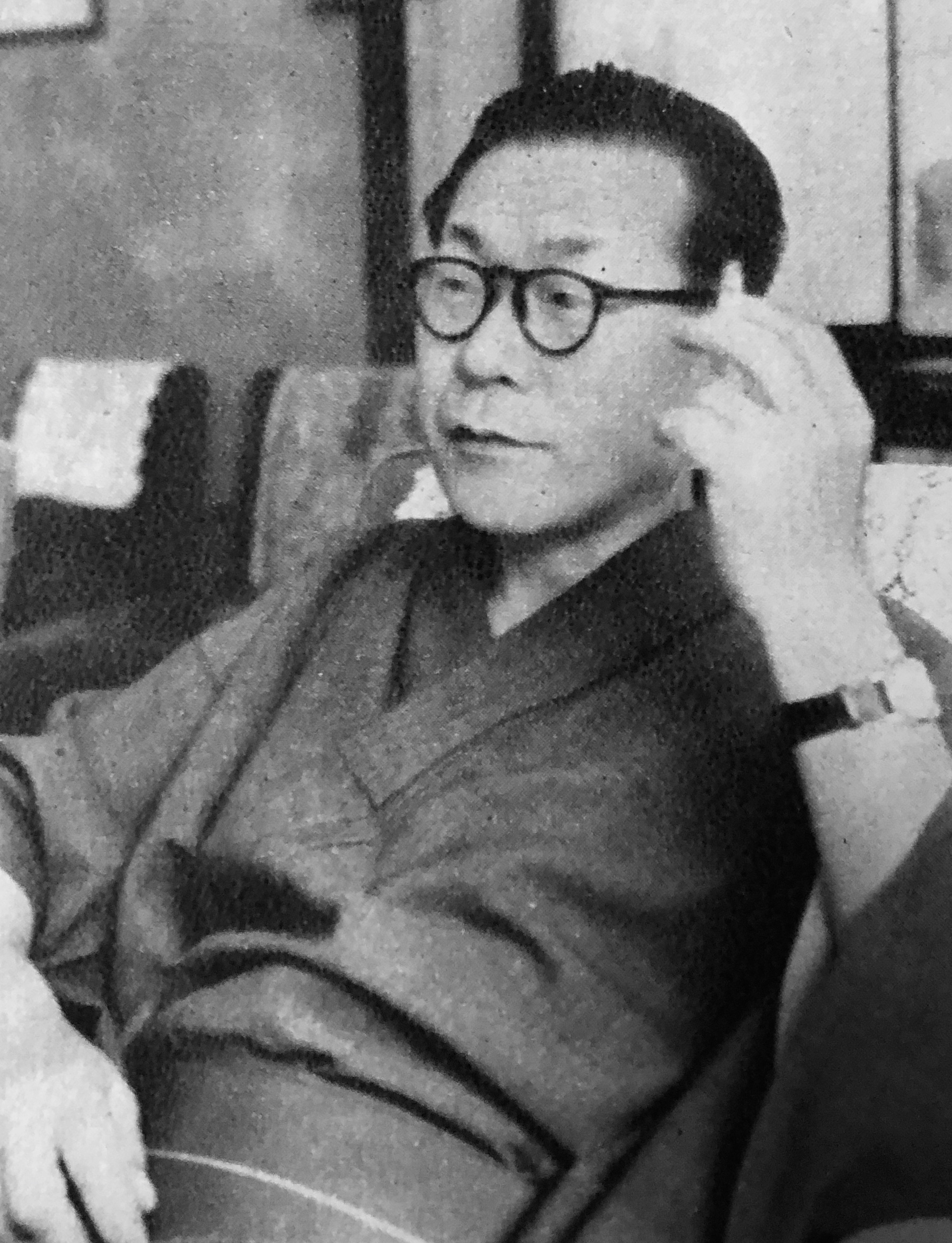
- Hayashi Fusao
- Born: 30 May 1903; Ōita Prefecture, Japan
- Died: 9 October 1975 (aged 72); Kamakura, Japan
- Occupations: Writer and literary critic
- Writing career
- Genre: Proletarian
- Notable work: Dai Toa Senso Kotei Ron

Gotō Toshio (後藤寿夫; 30 May 1903 – 9 October 1975), known by his pen name Hayashi Fusao (林 房雄), was a Japanese novelist and literary critic in Shōwa period Japan. He is known for his early works in the proletarian literature movement, although he later became an ultranationalist. He also used the alias Shirai Akira.

== Early life ==
Hayashi was born in Ōita Prefecture in 1903. His father was an alcoholic, and bankrupted the family grocery business, which forced his mother to work in a cotton mill to provide income for the family. He was only able to complete high school by working as a live-in tutor in the household of a wealthy banker. Hayashi was able to obtain admission to the law school of Tokyo Imperial University, where he led Marxist seminars, but he left school in 1925 to devote his energies to leftist politics and to the arts.

== Literary career ==
Hayashi was arrested in early 1926 as part of a roundup of communists and suspected communist sympathizers in universities under the provisions of the Peace Preservation Law and was incarcerated for ten months. His literary career began when he was released, with the publication of a short story, Ringo ("Apple") in Bungei Sensen ("Literary Battlefront"). This also marked his beginnings as a leading member of the Proletarian literature Movement. With other like-minded writers, he founded the Proletarian Artist Federation in 1927. However, Hayashi was arrested again for his fund-raising activities for the Japanese Communist Party, and was incarcerated in Toyotami Prison, outside of Tokyo in 1930.

While in prison, Hayashi was subject to self-criticism and underwent an ideological reversal before his release in 1932. After his release, he moved to Kamakura and wrote Seinen ("Youth"). This was quickly followed by Bungaku no Tame ni ("For Literature"), Sakka to shite ("As an Artist"), whose themes deny the subordination of literature to politics. Hayashi joined Kobayashi Hideo, Kawabata Yasunari, Hirotsu Kazuo and others to publish the mainstream literary journal Bungakukai ("Literary World") in 1933. From 1934-1935, he moved to Itō, Shizuoka, where he wrote Roman Shugisha no Techo ("Notes of a Romanticist") in 1935, declaring his estrangement from Marxism.

Hayashi returned to Kamakura, where he lived for the remainder of his life, and officially renounced all connections to the proletarian literature movement in 1936. With the start of the Second Sino-Japanese War in 1937, he was also sent to China together with a number of other leading writers (including Eiji Yoshikawa, Nobuko Yoshiya, Kunio Kishida, and Tatsuzō Ishikawa) to be embedded within the Imperial Japanese Army, to write reports and stories supporting the war effort.

In 1943, Hayashi toured Korea, Manchukuo and Japanese-occupied north China as a member of the Literary Home-Front Campaign (Bungei Jugo Undo), a speech-making troupe organized to promote patriotism and support for the war.

After World War II, together with Ango Sakaguchi, Hayashi coined the term Buraiha in 1947 to describe the new trend in post-war Japanese literature. Along with hundreds of other writers, he was purged by the American occupation authorities and was not allowed to publish until the end of occupation in 1952. His wife, Shigeko, who had been suffering from mental instability for several years, committed suicide at their home in Kamakura in 1952.

Hayashi then turned to apolitical popular novels with family themes, including Musuko no Seishun (My "Son's Youth") and Tsuma no Seishun ("My Wife's Youth").

In 1962, Hayashi published Dai Toa Senso Kotei Ron, ("The Great East Asia War was a Just War") in Chūōkōron. The work astounded his former Marxist colleagues with an apologia for Japanese militarism and the Pan-Asianism in World War II, and a stinging criticism of leftist pacifism. Controversy over the work continues, even decades since its publication. Mishima Yukio regarded Hayashi Fusao as his mentor, although the two had a falling out after a meeting in 1966, and Mishima was later highly critical of Hayashi in a critique published in 1971.

Hayashi continued to write until his death in 1975. His grave is at the temple of Hokoku-ji in Kamakura.

=== Dai Toa Senso Kotei Ron ===
Hayashi wrote Dai Toa Senso Kotei Ron in commemoration of the hundredth anniversary of the Meiji Restoration. It was immediately highly controversial on its release in the Chūōkōron literary magazine, and it has served as a model for later revisionist historians. Hayashi's premise can be summarized as follows:

1. The Asia-Pacific War cannot be separated from the process of Japanese modernization beginning with the late Edo period.
2. Japanese modernization was a defensive reaction against western aggression in the colonization of Asia.
3. The Japanese annexation of Korea and invasion of China and Southeast Asia were necessary to contain western imperialism and became a catalyst for Asian national liberation.
4. Japan was not an imperialist state in a Leninist sense.
5. In the process of modernization, Japan did not adopt aggressive imperialism in the western European sense.
6. The Japanese emperor system is not a fascist institution; it is based on an ethnic and cultural foundation.

To Hayashi the real enemy of the Asian nations is the United States, just as the United States has been Japan's foe for the last one hundred years. Although Hayashi remains apologetic about the suffering caused by the Japanese invasion of Asia, he promotes the viewpoint that the war liberated not only Japan, but also the rest of Asia from Western domination.

== See also ==
- Japanese literature
- List of Japanese authors
