= Hiroo Yamagata =

Japanese writer (born 1964)

Hiroo Yamagata (山形 浩生, Yamagata Hiroo; born 13 March 1964) is a Japanese author, critic, economist and translator. He translated some works in computer technology such as The Cathedral and the Bazaar by Eric S. Raymond, Code and Other Laws of Cyberspace by Lawrence Lessig into Japanese.

He is the founder and chairman of Project Sugita Genpaku, which is a volunteer effort to translate free content texts into Japanese.

== See also ==
- Japanese literature
- List of Japanese authors
