= List of Japanese writers: E =

The following is a list of Japanese writers whose family name begins with the letter E

List by Family Name: A - B - C - D - E - F - G - H - I - J - K - M - N - O - R - S - T - U - W - Y - Z
- Edogawa Ranpo (October 21, 1894 – July 28, 1965)
- Rokusuke Ei (April 10, 1933 – July 7, 2016)
- Eiji Yoshikawa (1892-1962)
- Ekuni Kaori (born March 21, 1964)
- Emi Suiin (August 12, 1869 – November 3, 1934)
- Enchi Fumiko (October 2, 1905 – November 12, 1986)
- Enjoe Toh (born September 15, 1972)
- Enokido Yoji (born 1963)
- Endo Shusaku (March 27, 1923 – September 29, 1996)
- Eto Jun (December 25, 1932 - July 21, 1999)
