= Baku Akae =

Japanese novelist

Baku Akae (赤江 瀑, Akae Baku; April 22, 1933 – June 8, 2012) was a Japanese novelist. He was born in Shimonoseki, Yamaguchi.

His novel Oidipusu no yaiba (オイディプスの刃, Oedipus' Sword) won the 1st Kadokawa Novel Award in 1974.

In 1984, his novels Kaikyou (海峡 Straits) and Yakumo ga Koroshita (八雲が殺した Yakumo Kills) won the Izumi Kyōka Prize for Literature.

== Selection of works ==
- Oidipusu no yaiba (オイディプスの刃 Oedipus' Sword). 1974.
- Kaikyou (海峡 Straits). 1984.
- Yakumo ga Koroshita (八雲が殺した Yakumo Kills). 1984. Translated by Nancy H Ross, Kaiki: Uncanny Tales from Japan, Volume 3: Tales of the Metropolis, Kurodahan Press, 2009.
- Aruman no dorei (アルマンの奴隷 Allemagne's Slaves). 1990.
- Gijokoku no mori no nagame (戯場国の森の眺め View of the Woods in the Playland) . 1996.
- Koso no fune (香草の船 The Grass Boat). 1990.

== See also ==
- Japanese literature
- List of Japanese authors
