= Kin'yuki Sonoike =

Kin'yuki Sonoike (園池 公致, Sonoike Kin'yuki; April 29, 1886 – January 3, 1974) was an author in Taishō and Shōwa period Japan.

Sonoike was born in Hirakawachō, Tokyo. His father was in the service of the Imperial Household Agency, and his grandfather was the appointive governor of Nara prefecture in the Meiji period. He left the Gakushuin Peers’ School to pursue a literary career and was one of the early members of the Shirakaba Society. His 1919 short story, Hitori Sumō influenced the writings of Kazuo Hirotsu. In his later years, he was considered a member of a conservative group, which included Tetsuro Watsuji, Saneatsu Mushanokōji and Michio Takeyama.
