= List of Japanese writers: W =

The following is a list of Japanese writers whose family name begins with the letter W

List by Family Name: A - B - C - D - E - F - G - H - I - J - K - M - N - O - R - S - T - U - W - Y - Z
- Wakayama Bokusui (August 24, 1885 – September 17, 1928)
- Watanabe Junichi
- Watanabe On (August 26, 1902 – February 10, 1930)
- Wataya Risa (born 1984)
