= Inoue Kenkabō =

Japanese writer (1870–1934)

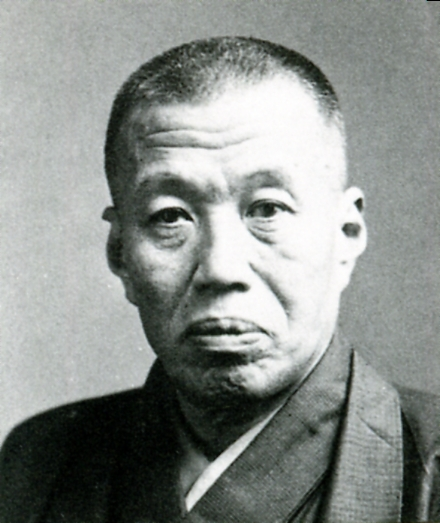
- Born: July 1, 1870; Hagi, Yamaguchi, Japan
- Died: September 26, 1934 (aged 64); Kamakura, Kanagawa, Japan
- Occupations: writer and journalist
- Writing career
- Genres: poetry, essays

Inoue Kenkabō (井上 剣花坊; July 1, 1870 – September 26, 1934) was the pen-name of a journalist and writer of senryū (short, humorous verse) in late Meiji, Taishō and early Shōwa period Japan. His real name was Inoue Kōichi.

== Early life ==
Inoue was born in Hagi city, Yamaguchi prefecture, as the son of an ex-samurai of the Chōshū domain. He was largely self-educated.

After working part-time as an elementary school teacher and a reporter for a local newspaper, he moved to Tokyo in 1900 and began writing the arts column for the literary magazine, Myogi. Three years later, he joined the Nihon Shimbun newspaper as a reporter. Using the pen name, "Kenkabō", he began a column called Shindai yanagidaru (Willow Barrel), which advocated a new style of senryū poetry.

== Literary career ==
In 1905, Inoue founded a poetry group called Ryusonji Senryū Kai, which brought out its own short-lived literary magazine called Senryū. After retiring from working as an employee of the Nihon Shimbun newspaper, Inoue continued to manage the senryū columns of the Kokumin Shimbun and Yomiuri Shimbun newspapers and later resurrected Senryū in 1912, renaming it Taishō Senryū, to mark the beginning of the new Taishō period.

With the arrival of the Shōwa period in 1926, he again changed the name of the magazine, this time to Senryūjin. He also wrote the essays, Proletariat Literature and Bourgeois Literature, and Senryū ōdō ron ("Royal Way of Senryū"), and contributed pieces to the magazines, Nihon oyobi Nihonjin ("Japan and the Japanese") and Kaizō ("Reconstruction"). Inoue's senryū are characterized by their grandeur and generosity. Inoue had disciples all around Japan, including Kawakami Santaro, Murata Shugyo and "Kijirō" (novelist Yoshikawa Eiji's senryū pen name). His works include Senryu from the Edo Period: Ichimei Senryu (1928), Shin senryū rokusen ku ("Six Thousand New Senryū"), Senryū o tsukuru hito ni ("For Senryū Poets") and Ko senryū shinzui ("The Essence of Classical Senryū").

In 1930, he worked with the artist Kondō Kōichiro to produce over 40 woodblock prints to match his poetry.

While staying at the temple of Kencho-ji in Kamakura, he suffered from a cerebral hemorrhage on September 8, 1934. He died three days later, and his grave is at that temple.

== Family ==
Inoue's wife, Inoue Nobuko (1869-1958), was also a senryū poet and editor, and started the first association for women senryū poets. However, she is better known for her outspoken criticism of the military during the Russo-Japanese War and against Japanese militarism in the 1930s. She was a nurse during the Russo-Japanese War; later she protected the antiwar writer Tsuru Akira and the two were arrested together in 1937.

Inoue and Nobuko had a daughter, Ôishi Tsuruko (born 1907).

== See also ==
- Japanese literature
- List of Japanese authors
