= List of Japanese writers: J =

The following is a list of Japanese writers whose family name begins with the letter J

List by Family Name: A - B - C - D - E - F - G - H - I - J - K - M - N - O - R - S - T - U - W - Y - Z
- Jakuren (1139–1202)
- Jien (1155–1225)
- Jinzai Kiyoshi (November 15, 1903 – March 11, 1957)
- Jippensha Ikku (1765–1831)
- Jun Maeda (born 1975)
