= Kuriyagawa Hakuson =

Japanese literary critic (1880–1923)

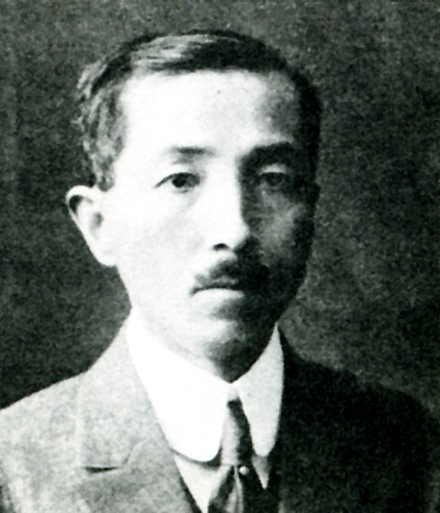
- Kuriyagawa Hakuson
- Born: 19 November 1880; Kyoto Japan
- Died: 2 September 1923 (aged 42); Kamakura, Kanagawa Japan
- Occupation: Writer
- Writing career
- Genre: literary criticism

Kuriyagawa Hakuson (廚川 白村; 19 November 1880 – 2 September 1923) was the pen-name of a Japanese literary critic, active in Taishō period Japan. His real name was Kuriyagawa Tatsuo.

== Early life ==
Kuriyagawa Hakuson was born in Kyoto. He graduated from Tokyo Imperial University, where he had studied under Koizumi Yakumo and Natsume Sōseki, and later became a professor at Kumamoto University and Kyoto Imperial University. He lectured on 19th century Western literature, and criticized traditional Japanese writing on naturalism and romanticism. His writings include: Kindai bungaku jikko ("Ten Aspects of Modern Literature", 1912), Zoge no to o dete ("Leave the Ivory Tower!", 1920) and Kindai no ren-aikan ("Modern Views on Love", 1922).

In Kindai no ren-aikan Hakuson regarded "love marriage" (renai kekkon) to be a practice indicating an advanced nation and society, as opposed to the practice of arranged marriage, which was more commonly practiced in Japan at the time.

He was killed by a tsunami, which swept away his cottage near the beach in Kamakura, Kanagawa prefecture, during the Great Kantō earthquake of 1923.

== See also ==
- Japanese literature
- List of Japanese authors
