= List of Japanese writers: R =

The following is a list of Japanese writers whose family name begins with the letter R

List by Family Name: A - B - C - D - E - F - G - H - I - J - K - M - N - O - R - S - T - U - W - Y - Z
- Reischauer Haru (1915–1998)
- Renjo Mikihiko (1948–2013)
- Ryōgo Narita (born 1980)
- Ryōkan (1758–1831)
- Ryo Mizuno (born 1963)
