= List of Japanese writers: N =

The following is a list of Japanese writers whose family name begins with the letter N

List by Family Name: A - B - C - D - E - F - G - H - I - J - K - M - N - O - R - S - T - U - W - Y - Z
- Nada Inanda (1929–2013)
- Nagai Kafu (December 4, 1879 – April 30, 1959)
- Nagai Tatsuo (May 20, 1904 – October 12, 1990)
- Nagai Michiko (1925–2023)
- Nagata Hideo (1885–1949)
- Nagata Mikihiko (1887–1964)
- Nagayo Yoshiro (August 6, 1888 – October 29, 1961)
- Nagatsuka Takashi (April 3, 1879 – February 8, 1915)
- Naito Torajiro (July 18, 1866 – June 26, 1934)
- Naka Kansuke (May 22, 1885 – May 3, 1965)
- Nakagami Kenji (August 2, 1946 – August 12, 1992)
- Nakahara Chuya (April 29, 1907 – October 22, 1937)
- Nakajima Atsushi (May 5, 1909 – December 4, 1942)
- Nakajima Ramo (April 3, 1952 – July 26, 2004)
- Nakamori Akio (born 1960)
- Nakamura Shinichiro (March 5, 1918 – December 25, 1997)
- Nakamura Mitsuo (February 5, 1911 – July 12, 1988)
- Nakane Chie (1926–2021)
- Nakano Koji (1925–2004)
- Nakayama Gishu (October 5, 1900 – August 19, 1969)
- Nakazato Tsuneko (1884–1945)
- Naito Joso (1662–1704)
- Naoki Sanjugo (February 12, 1891 – February 24, 1934)
- Narushima Ryūhoku (1837–1934)
- Natsume Sōseki (February 9, 1867 – December 9, 1916)
- Nasu Kinoko (born 1973)
- Nicol, Clive (1940–2020)
- Niimi Nankichi (July 30, 1913 – March 22, 1943)
- Niki Etsuko (1928–1986)
- Nishimura Kyotaro (1930–2022)
- Nishiyama Sōin (1605–1682)
- Nishio Ishin (born 1981)
- Nishiwaki Junzaburo (January 20, 1894 – June 5, 1982)
- Niwa Fumio (November 22, 1904 – April 20, 2005)
- Nitobe Inazo (September 1, 1862 – October 15, 1933)
- Nitta Jirō (1912–1980)
- Nobumoto Keiko (born 1964)
- Nishida Kitaro (1870–1945)
- Nobori Shomu (1878–1958)
- Noda Hideki (playwright) (born 1955)
- Nogami Yaeko (1885–1985)
- Noguchi Fujio (1911–1993)
- Nogushi Yonejiro December 8, 1875 – July 13, 1947)
- Noma Hiroshi (February 23, 1915 – January 2, 1991)
- Nomi Masahiko (July 18, 1925 – October 30, 1981)
- Nomura Kodo (1882–1963)
- Nosaka Akiyuki (October 10, 1930 — December 9, 2015)
- Nukata no Ōkimi (630–690)
