= Momoko Hirotsu =

Japanese novelist

- 広津 桃子
- Born: 21 March 1918
- Died: 24 November 1988 (aged 70)
- Occupation: novelist

Momoko Hirotsu (広津 桃子, Hirotsu Momoko; 21 March 1918 – 24 November 1988) was a Japanese novelist. She was the daughter of Kazuo Hirotsu.

== Biography ==
After her father died, Hirotsu wrote Haru no oto (春の音), which won the Toshiko Tamura award in 1972. She also wrote Tsuwabuki no hana (石蕗の花), which won the Women's Literature award in 1981. She wrote fewer works than her father Kazuo and her grandfather Hirotsu Ryurō. Momoko, who never married, died childless. She was buried at Yanaka Cemetery.
