= Yutaka Mafune =

- Mafune Yutaka
- Born: 16 February 1902; Koriyama, Fukushima, Japan
- Died: 3 August 1977 (aged 75); Tokyo, Japan
- Occupation: Writer
- Writing career
- Genre: stage plays

Yutaka Mafune (真船 豊, Mafune Yutaka; 16 February 1902 – 3 August 1977) was a Japanese playwright, novelist and director active during the Shōwa period of Japan.

== Biography ==
Mafune was born in what is now Koriyama city, Fukushima prefecture to the wealthy family of a local sake brewer and landowner. Adopted into the household of a family friend in Hokkaido, he was treated as a servant, and fled his adopted household back to Fukushima. Mafune studied English literature at the Literature Department of Waseda University in Tokyo, where he became interested in the Irish theater, and where he started to write one-act plays. He was influenced by the works of Henrik Ibsen and August Strindberg as well as the politics of Irish revolutionary leader James Connolly.

He left school to join a leftist agrarian commune in the late 1920s modeled after Connolly's views on syndicalism. Some of his early works, including Itachi ("Weasel", 1934) depict the landlord-peasant conflict. Itachi (written under forced confinement at his father's house) was written entirely in the local Fukushima dialect used by the peasantry. It appeared as a stage play directed by Kubota Mantaro at the Sosaku-za theater in Tokyo and was received well by critics, establishing Mafunes reputation as a playwright.

Mafune then turned his attention satire and to the urban proletariat, including works such as Taiyo no ko (“Children of the Sun”, 1936), Hadaka no machi (“Naked City”, 1936), Mishinaru hito (“The Stranger”, 1936), Kabi (“Mold”, 1938) and Haien (“Deserted Garden”, 1936) which was subsequently staged by shimpa or shingeki theater groups; a few of his works were also subsequently adapted into movies.

After World War II, Mafune turned towards works of comedy, starting with Nakahashi kokan (“Nakahashi Household”, 1948), about a Japanese family stuck in China after the end of the war. He also became very active in creating scripts for radio dramas.

In the 1950s, Mafune created his own theater, the Mafune Yutaka Shosai Gekijō, to produce and stage his own plays and to revitalize the shingeki movement. Koreya Senda a noted actor-director, staged the “Nakahashi Household” at the new theater, and Mafune himself directed a number of plays, mostly in the genre of farce. His collected works were published in five volumes from 1946-1950. He died in 1977.

== See also ==
- Japanese literature
- List of Japanese authors
