= Yōko Hagiwara =

Japanese novelist

Yōko Hagiwara (萩原葉子; September 4, 1920–July 1, 2005) was a Japanese writer. She wrote extensively about her family.

== Biography ==
Hagiwara was born in Tokyo on September 4, 1920. Her father was Sakutarō Hagiwara. Hagiwara's younger sister became brain damaged from meningitis in 1927, and her mother left her father in 1929. Her mother's abandonment left her with trauma that influenced her later writing. Hagiwara married a civil servant in 1944, and they had a child, the cinematographer Sakumi Hagiwara. She studied at Kokugakuin University from 1949 to 1952. She divorced her husband in 1953.

Hagiwara's writing career began with a book of essays published in 1959. It was called Chichi Hagiwara Sakutarō (父・萩原朔太郎), and won the Japan Essayist Club Award. Her next major work was titled Tenjō no Hana and was published in 1966. It was a biographical novel about Tatsuji Miyoshi, a poet who had courted Hagiwara's aunt, Ai Hagiwara. The novel was nominated for the Akutagawa Award and won the Toshiko Tamura Prize and the Shinchōsha Literary Prize. It was adapted into a film starring Masahiro Higashide in 2022. Many of Hagiwara's novels were about her family and their internal struggles, from her father's extended family almost throwing her out of the house after his death, her escape into a marriage, her dissatisfaction within that marriage, and the difficult relationship she had with her mother after Hagiwara found her in Hokkaido.

In the 1980s she began writing significantly less material about her complex family dynamics. Hajimete no Kisetsu (初めての季節) and Osozaki no Adajio (遅咲きのアダジオ) are both about dancing, an interest that she had taken up during that period. Researcher Sachiko Schierbeck notes that Hagiwara's popularity comes from her "frank depictions of the shadier sides of life" and her informal writing style.

Hagiwara died on July 1, 2005, in Tokyo.

== Selected works ==
- Chichi Hagiwara Sakutarō (父・萩原朔太郎), 1959
- Tenjō no Hana, 1966
- Hajimete no Kisetsu (初めての季節), 1983
- Osozaki no Adajio (遅咲きのアダジオ), 1984
