= Tsugi Takano =

Tsugi Takano (鷹野 つぎ, Takano Tsugi; August 15, 1890 – March 19, 1943) was a female novelist from Hamamatsu in Shizuoka prefecture, Japan. She was born in 1890 as the second daughter of a local merchant. In 1904, she entered Hamamatsu Women's High School and in 1907 she entered Shizuoka Women's High School. However, she was forced to withdraw because of an eye disease. In 1909, at the age of 19, she married newspaper reporter Yasaburō Takano despite the objections of those around her. She moved with her husband to Toyohashi, Fukushima, and Tokyo. In the midst of her husband's long unemployment, six of eight of her children succumbed to ill health. She herself fought a long battle with tuberculosis to which she succumbed to in 1943 at the age of 52.

From her time at Hamamatsu Woman's High School developed a deepening interest in the writings of female literary circles. In 1922 she published her first novel, Allotment of Sorrow (悲しき配分, kanashiki haibun). Later, while on her sickbed, she wrote a novel with 11 volumes. Her works urged the calm self-discovery and self-reformation of woman.

There is a stone monument dedicated to Takano at Hamamatsu Municipal High School (the original Hamamatsu Woman's High). Inscribed on the monument is one of her poems where she writes about thinking of her home town.

== Works ==
Her works include:

- Kusa-yabu (草藪) "A grassy hedge"
- Mado (窓) "Window"
- Toki (時) "Time"
- Mushi-hoshi (虫干し) "Drying Insects"

See also: Japanese literature, List of Japanese authors
