= Aeba Kōson =

Japanese author and theater critic

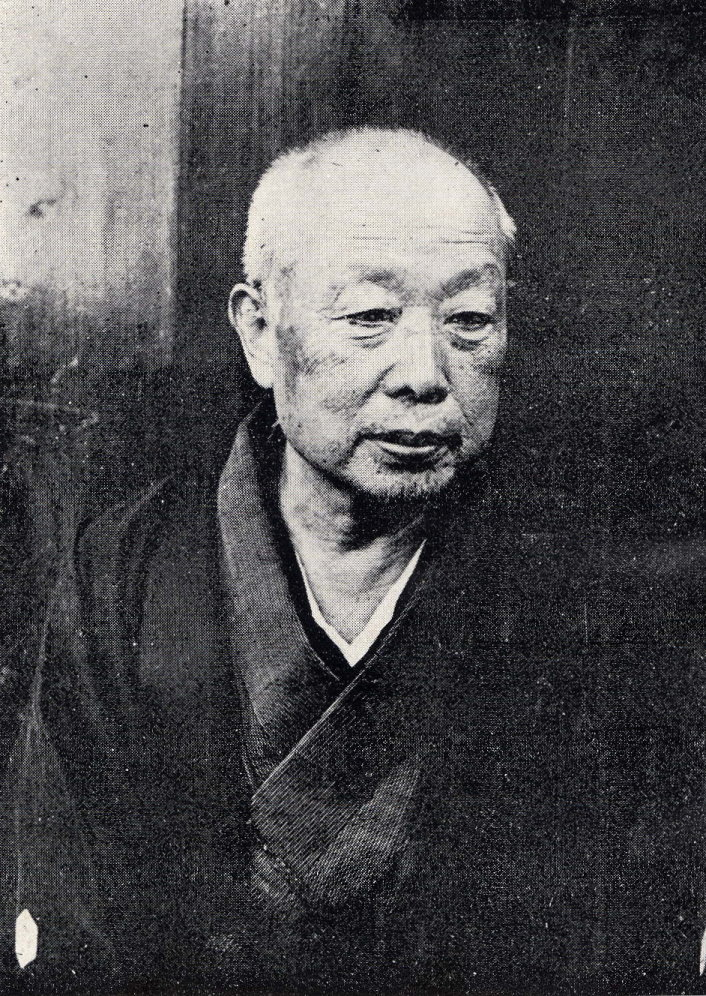
Aeba Kōson

Aeba Kōson (饗庭 篁村; August 15, 1855 – June 20, 1922) was a Japanese author, theater critic, and calligraphy master. His real name is Yosaburou Aeba (饗庭與三郎). He was also called "The Master of the Bamboo Hut" (竹の屋主人).

He was born in Shitaya Ryuusenji-cho in Taitō Ward, Tokyo.

Among his works is his translation of Edgar Allan Poe's The Murders in the Rue Morgue. He is buried in Somei cemetery in Tokyo.

== Works ==
- Tōsei shounin katagi (当世商人気質 The Modern-Day Mercantile Spirit). Serialized in Yomiuri Shinbun, 1886-1889.
- Hito no uwasa (人の噂 Rumors). Serialized in Yomiuri Shinbun, 1886.
- Sōmatō(走馬燈 Revolving Lantern). Published in Yomiuri Shinbun, 1886.
- Kontan (魂膽 Scheme). Published in Yomiuri Shinbun, 1888.
- Menbokutama (面目玉 Face). Published in Yomiuri Shinbun, 1889.
- Horidashimono (掘り出し物 Lucky Find). Yoshioka Shoseki, 1888.
- Ryōya (良夜 Moonlit Night). 1889.
- Kakeochi no kakeochi (驅落の驅落 Running Away from Running Away).
- Haikai kichigai (俳諧気違ひ Haikai Crazy).

== See also ==
- Japanese literature
- List of Japanese authors
