= List of Japanese writers: G =

The following is a list of Japanese writers whose family name begins with the letter G

List by Family Name: A - B - C - D - E - F - G - H - I - J - K - M - N - O - R - S - T - U - W - Y - Z
- Gato Shoji
- Gomi Kosuke (1921–1980)
- Gomikawa Junpei (1916 – c. 1990)
- Emperor Go-Toba, emperor of Japan (August 6, 1180 – March 28, 1239)
- Goto Ben (1929–2020)
- Goto Chugai (December 23, 1866 – June 12, 1938)
- Goto Meisei (April 4, 1932 – August 2, 1999)
