= List of Japanese writers: B =

The following is a list of Japanese writers whose family name begins with the letter B.

List by family name: A - B - C - D - E - F - G - H - I - J - K - M - N - O - R - S - T - U - W - Y - Z
- Betsuyaku Minoru (1937 - 2020)
