= List of Japanese writers: F =

The following is a list of Japanese writers whose family name begins with the letter F

List by Family Name: A - B - C - D - E - F - G - H - I - J - K - M - N - O - R - S - T - U - W - Y - Z
- Fujieda Shizuo (December 20, 1907 – April 16, 1993)
- Fujii Sadakazu (born 1942)
- Fujisawa Shū (born 1959)
- Fujita Yoshinaga (1950–2020)
- Fujiwara no Akisue (1055–1123)
- Fujiwara no Ietaka (1158–1237)
- Fujiwara no Kintō (966–1041)
- Fujiwara no Shunzei (1114–1204)
- Fujiwara no Teika (1162–1241)
- Fukada Kyūya (November 3, 1903 – March 21, 1971)
- Fukazawa Shichirō (January 29, 1914 – August 18, 1987)
- Fukuchi Gen'ichirō (May 13, 1841 – January 4, 1906)
- Fukuda Eiko (October 5, 1865 – May 2, 1927)
- Fukuda Sadayoshi (1917–2002)
- Fukushima Masami (February 18, 1929 – April 9, 1976)
- Fukuzawa Yukichi (January 10, 1835 – February 3, 1901)
- Funahashi Seiichi (December 25, 1904 – January 13, 1976)
- Furui Yoshikichi (1937–2020)
- Futabatei Shimei (February 28, 1864 – May 10, 1909)
