= List of Japanese writers: D =

Writers

The following is a list of Japanese writers whose family name begins with the letter D

List by Family Name: A - B - C - D - E - F - G - H - I - J - K - M - N - O - R - S - T - U - W - Y - Z
- Dazai Osamu (June 19, 1909 – June 13, 1948)
- Dan Kazuo (February 3, 1912 - January 2, 1976)
- Dan Oniroku (April 16, 1931 - May 6, 2011)
