= List of Japanese writers: Z =

The following is a list of Japanese writers whose family name begins with the letter Z

List by Family Name: A - B - C - D - E - F - G - H - I - J - K - M - N - O - R - S - T - U - W - Y - Z
- Zeami Motokiyo (1363–1443)
