= List of Japanese writers: U =

The following is a list of Japanese writers whose family name begins with the letter U

List by Family Name: A - B - C - D - E - F - G - H - I - J - K - M - N - O - R - S - T - U - W - Y - Z
- Uchida Hyakken (May 29, 1889 – April 20, 1971)
- Uchimura Kanzō (March 26, 1861 – March 28, 1930)
- Ueda Akinari (July 25, 1734 – August 8, 1809)
- Ueda Makoto (writer on poetry) (1931–2020)
- Ueda Makoto (writer on architecture)
- Uemura Shoen (1875–1949)
- Umezu Kazuo (1936–2024)
- Unno Juza (December 26, 1897 – May 17, 1949)
- Urobuchi Gen (born 1972)
- Usui Yoshimi (1905–1987)
