= List of Japanese writers: C =

The following is a list of Japanese writers whose family name begins with the letter C

List by Family Name: A - B - C - D - E - F - G - H - I - J - K - M - N - O - R - S - T - U - W - Y - Z
- Chikamatsu Monzaemon (1653 - January 6, 1724)
- Chin Shunshin (18 February 1924 - 21 January 2015)
- Chiri Yukie (June 8, 1903 – September 18, 1922)
- Fukuda Chiyo-ni (also known as Kaga no Chiyo) (1703–1775)
