= Hiraide Shū =

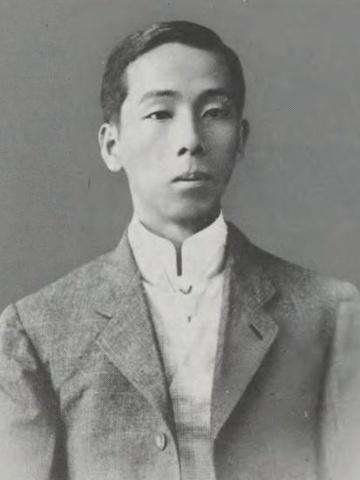
- Hiraide Shū
- Born: 3 April 1878; Niigata, Japan
- Died: 17 March 1914
- Occupation: writer, lawyer
- Genre: novels, poetry

Hiraide Shū (平出 修, 3 April 1878 – 17 March 1914) was a novelist, poet, and lawyer in late Meiji period Japan. As a lawyer, he was noted for his involvement in the defense of the accused in the High Treason Incident.

== Biography ==
Born the eighth son of a relatively prosperous farming family in rural Niigata prefecture, Hiraide graduated from the Meiji Hōritsu Gakkō (the predecessor to the legal school of Meiji University) in 1903. He opened his own legal office in the Jimbocho area of Kanda, Tokyo in 1904. This district was (and still is) noted for the large number of publishers and book dealers based in the area.

Hiraide was one of the founding members of the literary journal Subaru. As a lawyer, Hiraide received widespread fame (or notoriety, depending on political viewpoint) for his defense of anarchist author Ōsugi Sakae, the defendants in the High Treason Incident, and for his defense of feminist poet Yosano Akiko over government criticism of her anti-war poetry.

== See also ==
- Japanese literature
- List of Japanese authors
