= Bochō Yamamura =

Japanese writer (1884-1924)

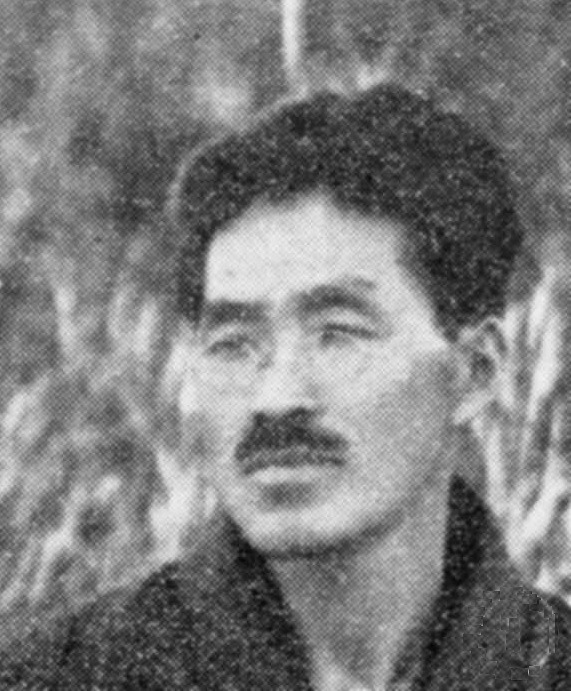
Yamamura Bochō

Bochō Yamamura (山村 暮鳥, Yamamura Bochō; January 10, 1884 – December 8, 1924) was a Japanese writer, poet and songwriter.

Bochō was born Tsuchida Hakkujū to a peasant family in present-day Takasaki, Gunma and struggled to become educated; his family's poverty prevented him from finishing elementary school. Nevertheless, he continued to study and educate himself to the point where he was hired to teaching at his former primary school as the age of fifteen. In 1902 he converted to Anglicanism, though some scholars have suggested he did so in order to gain access to a university education. He gained the public's attention thanks to his acutely sensitive poetry. Suffering from tuberculosis, out of work, and living a sad vagabond life, he kept writing poetry, fairy tales and songs for children with a humanity-filled, warm style. In his last years, he composed a number of simply-worded and yet highly inspirational odes to nature.

Bochō was one of the earliest Japanese writers to be described as a Futurist in a 1916 article by Sakutarō Hagiwara.
