= Zenzō Kasai =

Japanese novelist

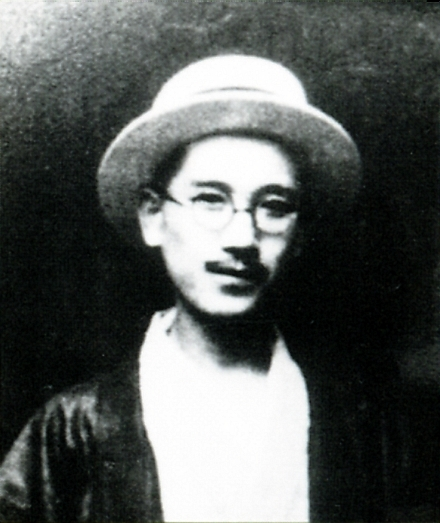
- Zenzō Kasai
- Born: 16 January 1887; Hirosaki, Aomori, Japan
- Died: 23 July 1928 (aged 41); Tokyo, Japan
- Occupation: Writer
- Writing career
- Genre: novels
- Literary movement: I Novel

Zenzō Kasai (葛西 善蔵, Kasai Zenzō; 16 January 1887 - 23 July 1928) was a Japanese novelist active in the Taishō period.

== Early life ==
Zenzō Kasai was born in what is now part of Hirosaki, Aomori, as the eldest son of a rice merchant. His parents died when he was two years old, and he was shuffled to relatives around Hokkaido and Aomori. He was only able to receive a primary school education. His relatives were resolved that he should become a Buddhist priest, but he moved to Tokyo at the age of 15 in order to find work, and to pursue a literary career. After working as an employee of a railroad, and as a forester, he saved up enough money to take classes at Toyo University and Waseda University, he met aspiring author Kazuo Hirotsu, and ended up as a disciple of author Tokuda Shusei. He studied philosophy, literature and English literature, but dropped out of school when he felt that he had learned enough (and when his money ran out).

== Literary career ==
In 1912, Kasai joined Shigeo Funaki and Kazuo Hirotsu in founding a new literary magazine, Kiseki ("Miracle"), and contributed various works to it. Kasai wrote novels in an autobiographical naturalist style, which was a forerunner of the "I novel". In 1918, he published Ko o tsuretete ("With Children in Tow") in the Waseda Bungaku magazine. The story, in which the narrator is evicted from his home and must wander the street penniless with his children, gained wide recognition. In his subsequent stories and novels, struggles against poverty, illness, alcoholism, and loneliness are constant themes. His major works include Kanashiki chichi ("Mourning Father", 1912), Akuma ("Devil", 1912), and Kohan Nikki ("Lakeside Diary", 1924).

Kasai lived in Kamakura, Kanagawa for many years, due to the presence of many fellow writers, and because the sea air was considered healthier for his weak lungs. He died in Tokyo at the age of 41 after a long struggle against tuberculosis aggravated by stress over the collapse of his marriage due to an affair. His grave is at the temple of Kencho-ji in Kamakura.

== See also ==
- Japanese literature
- List of Japanese authors
