= Ken'yūsha =

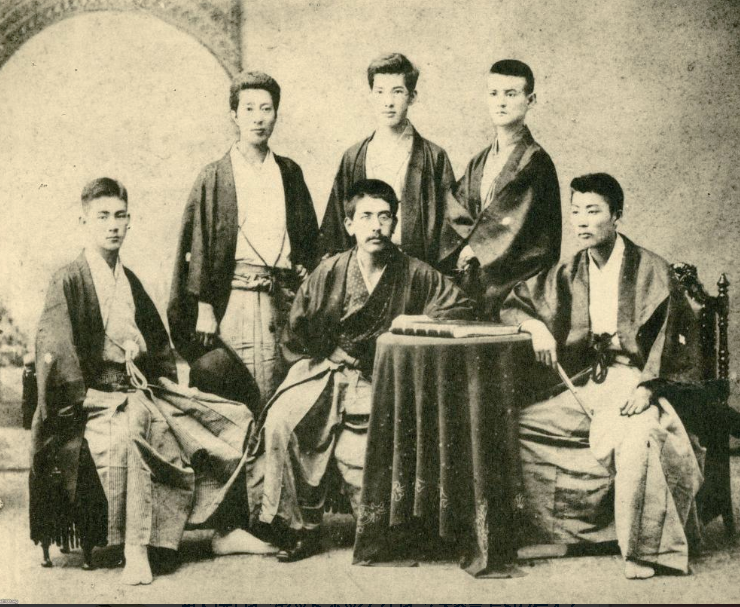
Ken'yūsha members, 1891

Ken'yūsha (硯友社, The Society of Friends of the Inkstone) was a writers' society in Meiji era Japan, chiefly led by Ozaki Kōyō. Ozaki founded the group with Ishibashi Shian and Maruoka Kyūka. Its other members included Kawakami Bizan, Yamada Bimyō, and Hirotsu Ryurō. The group's magazine, Garakuta Bunko (我楽多文庫), launched in 1885, was the first Japanese journal to focus on literature. It ceased publication in October 1889.
