= Rinko Kimino =

Rinko Kimino is a Japanese author, whose work focuses on kimono, Japanese zakka (folk craft goods) and kabuki. She also writes and edits books, magazines and newspapers, and is a renowned kimono stylist and a product development planner for Japanese zakka.

Her works are modern versions of Japanese traditions such as kimono, tenugui towels and the kabuki theater, geared toward young people in Japan.

== Career ==
After graduating from college, Kimino was hired by an import/export company in the United States. She later returned to Japan and became a freelance writer, writing for evening newspapers and magazines about parenting and women's lifestyle issues, and working as a planner, editor and director for websites dedicated to childcare and women.

She started writing for books, newspaper and magazines about kimono and "Wa" (Japanese style), in which she became interested during her stay in the United States. Kimino moved to Los Angeles in May 2010 and has continued writing to introduce Japanese culture to non-Japanese people.

== Publications ==
Kimino's published books include:

- Hand Craft Memo for Kimono (Hand-Made Kimono Crafts) (published by Shogakukan)
- Rinko Kimino's Nosey Kimono Calendar (by Shogakukan)
- Cute Kabuki Costume Picture Book (A Guide to Cute Kabuki Costumes) with supervision from kabuki actor Somegoro Ichikawa (Shogakukan)
- Kabuki's Amazing Enjoyment Picture Book (Super Indulgent Kabuki Guide) (Shogakukan)
- Heisei Kimono Picture Book (Kawade-Shobou Co.)
- Haikara (hi-fashion) Tenugui Towel Guide (Kawade-Shobou Co.)
- Kimono Convenience Guide (Kawade-Shobou Co.)
- Rinko Kimino's Kimono Dress-up Book (Mainichi Communications)
