= Hirotsu Ryurō =

Hirotsu Ryūrō
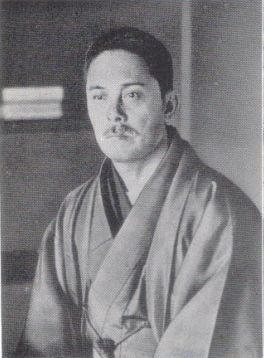
- Hirotsu Ryūrō
- Born: 15 July 1861; Nagasaki, Japan
- Died: 15 October 1928 (aged 67); Tokyo Japan (?)
- Occupation: Writer
- Writing career
- Genre: novels
- Literary movement: Tragic Novel

Hirotsu Naoto (15 July 1861 - 15 October 1928), known by his pen name Hirotsu Ryūrō (広津 柳浪), was a Japanese novelist during the Meiji period. He is credited with the creation of the tragic novel (悲惨小説, hisan shōsetsu) genre in Japanese literature.

== Early life ==
Hirotsu was born in Nagasaki, Buzen province (present-day Nagasaki prefecture), to a samurai-class family originally from Kurume Domain. His father had been trained as a doctor, and was in Nagasaki studying western medicine at the time of the Meiji Restoration. Under the new Meiji government, he became a diplomat, and was involved in the Seikanron issue between Japan and Korea.

Hirotsu was sent to Tokyo in 1874 to study the German language, and subsequently enrolled in the medical preparatory school of Tokyo Imperial University, but left without graduating in 1877. The following year, at the invitation of his father's friend Godai Tomoatsu, he moved to Osaka, and obtained a position as a bureaucrat in the Ministry of Agriculture and Commerce from 1881 to 1885. Around this time, he read the Chinese literature classic Outlaws of the Marsh and the Japanese fantasy novel Nansō Satomi Hakkenden by Kyokutei Bakin. These works, combined with the death of his father, formed a turning point in his life, and he decided to abandon his secure career in the government for life as a writer.

== Literary career ==
In 1899, Hirotsu met Ozaki Kōyō, and joined his literary group Ken'yūsha. In 1895, he published two novels which enabled him to achieve literary recognition: Hemeden and Kurotokage. These were the first of a new genre in Japanese literature, the "tragic novel", which he created. Heavily influenced by earlier Edo period gesaku writing, his stories are filled with improbable or incredible events, melodrama, romanticism and rather wooden characterization. His plots are typified by an inexorable progression of the protagonist through a series of pathetic and wretched experiences towards destruction dictated by an inflexible fate. His most famous work, Imado Shinjū (Suicide at Imado), was published in 1896.

Hirotsu retired from writing in 1908, and died of a heart attack in 1928. His grave is at the Yanaka Cemetery in Tokyo. The writer Hirotsu Kazuo was his son.

== See also ==
- Japanese literature
- List of Japanese authors
