= Bizan Kawakami =

Japanese writer (1869–1908)

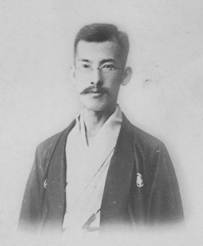
Bizan Kawakami

Bizan Kawakami (川上 眉山, Kawakami Bizan; March 5, 1869 – June 15, 1908) was a Japanese novelist of the Meiji era. His real name was Akira Kawakami (川上 亮, Kawakami Akira). Born in Osaka Prefecture, he dropped out of the school of liberal arts in Tokyo University and joined Ken'yusha. After struggling with the rise of naturalist literature yet remaining a popular author until his death, he died by suicide at age 40.

Aozora Bunko has a digitalized collection of his works.
