= Ryuko Kawaji =

Japanese poet and literary critic (1888–1959)

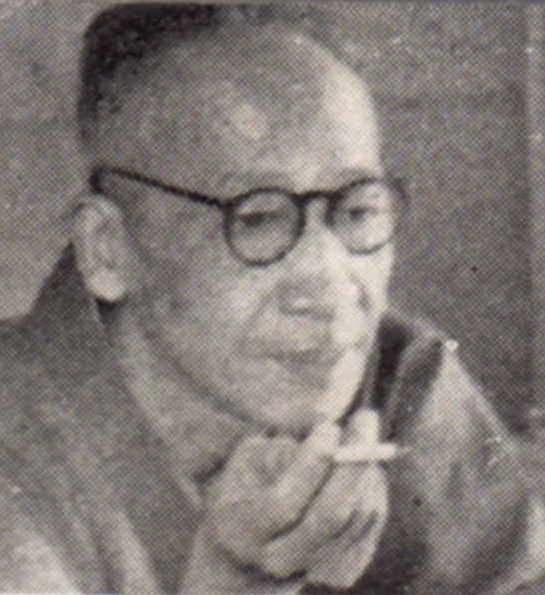

Ryuko Kawaji (川路 柳虹, Kawaji Ryūkō; 1 October 1888 - 9 June 1959) was the pen-name of Kawaki Makoto, a Japanese poet and literary critic active during the Shōwa period of Japan.

His Dharma name was Onyōin Metsuyo Chitoku Ryūkō Daikoji (温容院滅与知徳柳虹大居士).

== Biography ==
Kawaji was born in Tokyo, and was a graduate of the Japanese Painting School of the Tokyo School of the Arts (present day Tokyo National University of Fine Arts and Music). However, rather than to pursue a career as an artist, he chose to become a writer of free verse poetry instead. His poetry was influential, as it was among the first to be written in the modern Japanese language.

He won the Japan Art Academy literary award in 1957 for his anthology Nami ("Waves").

He was co-author of "Histoire de la Littérature Japonaise", written in collaboration with K. Matsuo and Alfred Smoular (Paris, 1935). His grave is at the Tama Reien outside of Tokyo.

== See also ==
- List of Japanese authors
- Hirato Renkichi
