= Jun Takami =

Japanese novelist and poet (1907–1965)

- 高見 順
- Takami Jun
- Born: 30 January 1907; Sakai city, Fukui Prefecture, Japan
- Died: 17 August 1965 (aged 58); Kamakura, Kanagawa, Japan
- Resting place: Tōkei-ji, Kamakura, Japan
- Education: Tokyo Imperial University
- Occupation: writer
- Writing career
- Genres: novels and poetry
- Notable awards: Mainichi Culture Award (1959); Shinchōsha Culture Award (1963); Noma Literary Prize (1964)
- Movement: Proletarian literature

Jun Takami (高見 順, Takami Jun; 30 January 1907 – 17 August 1965) was the pen-name of a Japanese novelist and poet active in Shōwa era Japan. His real name was Takami Yoshio.

== Early life ==
Takami was born in Mikuni, Fukui (part of the present-day city of Sakai), as the illegitimate son of the prefecture's governor and a young woman who had been assigned to entertain him on a visit to her town. The famous writer Nagai Kafū was his half-brother.

== Literary career ==
Takami was interested in literature from youth, and was particularly attracted to the humanism expressed by the Shirakaba writers. On entering Tokyo Imperial University he joined a leftist student arts group, and contributed to their literary journal (Sayoku Geijutsu). After graduation, he went to work for Columbia Records, and continued his activities as a Marxist writer, as part of the proletarian literature movement.

In 1932, he was arrested with other communists and suspected members of the Japan Communist Party under the Peace Preservation Laws, and was released six months later after being coerced into recanting his leftist ideology. An auto-biographical account of his experience appeared in Kokyū wasure ubeki ("Should Auld Acquaintance Be Forgot", 1935), which, although considered wordy, was nominated for the first Akutagawa Prize. The theme of ironic self-pity over the weakness that led to his "conversion" and his subsequent intellectual confusion were recurring themes in his future works.

He gained a popular following in the pre-war years with Ikanaru hoshi no moto ni ("Under Whatever Star", 1939–1940), a story set in the Asakusa entertainment district of Tokyo.

During and immediately after World War II, Takami served as Director of the Investigation Bureau of the Japanese Literature Patriotic Association. After the war, he suffered from poor health, but continued to write poetry from his sickbed.

In 1962, Takami helped establish the Museum of Modern Japanese Literature. In 1964, his poetry collection Shi no fuchi yori ("From the Abyss of Death", 1964) won the Noma Prize. The same year, he also published, Takami Jun nikki, ("The Diaries of Takami Jun"), an extremely detailed account of over 3000 pages, in which he described his experiences during the war and immediately afterwards.

Takami Jun lived in Kamakura, Kanagawa prefecture from 1943 until his death of esophageal cancer. His grave is at the temple of Tōkei-ji in Kamakura.

== Legacy ==
The Takami Jun Prize was established in 1967 by the Association for the Promotion of Literature by Takami Jun (Takami Jun Bungaku Shinkō Kai) in accordance with his last will and testament. A portion of Takami's royalties was set aside to establish a fund used to present an annual literary award to the writer of an outstanding collection of poetry, based upon the recommendations of poets, critics, and journalists. The winner receives a cash award of 500,000 yen.

His daughter Kyōko is married to professional wrestler and politician Hiroshi Hase.

== See also ==
- Japanese literature
- List of Japanese authors
