= Saitō Ryokuu =

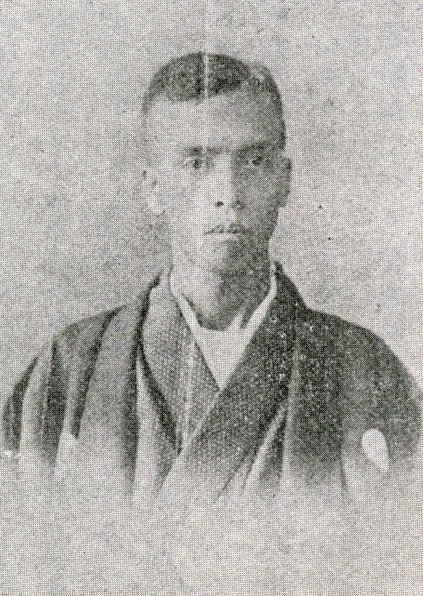
Saitō Ryokuu

Saitō Masaru (斎藤 賢; 24 January 1868 – 13 April 1904), better known by his pen name Saitō Ryokuu (斎藤 緑雨), was a Japanese author and critic who lived during the Meiji Era. His Dharma name was Shungyōin Ryokuu Suikaku Koji (春暁院緑雨醒客居士), which was chosen by Kōda Rohan.

== Biography ==
In 1896, with Mori Ōgai (森 鷗外) and Kōda Rohan (幸田 露伴), Ryokuu started a literary journal, Mezamashi gusa (めさまし草) in which Takekurabe (たけくらべ) by Higuchi Ichiyō (樋口 一葉) was met with high critical acclaim. After Ichiyō died on November of that year, Ryokuu helped her mother and sister make a living although he was far from being well-off. His literary friends include Kōtoku Shūsui (幸徳 秋水), Baba Kochō (馬場 孤蝶) and Yosano Tekkan (与謝野 鉄幹).

Ryokuu was a distinguished aphorist, as well as one of the most outspoken critics. Collections of his aphorisms were published in the late 20th century.

In 1904, the tuberculosis which had plagued Ryokuu for years worsened, and no medical care helped him recuperate. On his deathbed, he referred Ichiyō's diaries, which he had hoped to publish, to Baba Kochō, and dictated him his own obituary. He died in the morning of 13 April of the same year.

== See also ==
- Japanese literature
- List of Japanese writers
- Writers from Japan
