= Kōnosuke Hinatsu =

Japanese poet (1890–1971)

- Born: 22 February 1890; Iida, Nagano, Japan
- Died: 13 June 1971 (aged 81); Iida, Nagano, Japan
- Occupations: Writer, University Professor
- Writing career
- Genres: poetry, literary criticism

Kōnosuke Hinatsu (日夏 耿之介, Hinatsu Kōnosuke; February 22, 1890 – June 13, 1971) was the pen-name of a Japanese poet known for his romantic and gothic poetry patterned after English literature. His real name was Kunito Higuchi.

== Biography ==
A native of what is now part of Iida city in Nagano prefecture, Hinatsu graduated from Waseda University, and was later a professor of English literature at Waseda. He was influenced by the works of Oscar Wilde and Edgar Allan Poe, and the Japanese writers Yukio Mishima and Tatsuhiko Shibusawa. His specialty was the translation of romantic and gothic poetry from English into Japanese. Always in poor health, and a fervent Roman Catholic, he always had an icon of the Virgin Mary in his room.

In 1915 Hinatsu founded the magazine Shijin (Poets) with Daigaku Horiguchi and Yaso Saijō.

In 1917, Hinatsu published the first anthology of his own works, Tenshin no sho, which combined elements from both genre into what he described as “gothic romanticism”. Using complex symbolism, his works were a distinct contrast from the realistic poetry then in vogue.

His critical study, Meiji Taisho shi shi (History of Poetry in the Meiji and Taisho eras, 1929) was the first scholarly history of modern Japanese poetry, and was appointed a professor at the Waseda University Department of Literature in 1931. He resigned in 1935, but after receiving his doctorate in literature, returned to Waseda University as a professor in 1939.

In 1949, he revised his History of Poetry in the Meiji and Taisho eras, expanding it into three volumes, which were awarded the 1st Yomiuri Prize in 1950. In 1952, Hinatsu accepted a post as professor of English literature at Aoyama Gakuin University; however, he suffered from a cerebral hemorrhage in 1956, and returned to his native Iida. In 1961, he returned to Tokyo and his post at Aoyama Gakuin University, where he remained until his death in 1971.

In 1986, the Hinatsu Kōnosuke Memorial Building was opened in his honor at the Iida Municipal Museum in Iida, Nagano.

== See also ==
- Japanese literature
- List of Japanese authors
