= Senge Motomaro =

Japanese poet

- Senge Motomaro
- Born: 8 June 1888; Tokyo, Japan
- Died: 14 March 1948 (aged 59)
- Occupation: Writer
- Writing career
- Genre: poetry

Senge Motomaro (千家 元麿; 8 June 1888 – 14 March 1948) was a Japanese poet active during the Taishō and Shōwa periods of Japan.

== Biography ==
Motomaro Senge was born in Tokyo as the younger son of the Shinto high priest of Izumo-taisha in Shimane Prefecture, who was also a member of the House of Peers. He was a member of the Shirakaba ("White Birch") literary circle, and published many of his poems in their literary magazine. Save for xenophobic poems written during World War II, his poetry reflects the philosophy of humanism with an optimistic perspective on the world. He was a prolific author, publishing as many as 30-40 works per month. His poems tend toward minimalism and describe everyday events and scenes, without resort to excessive sentimentality.

His anthology, Jibun wa mita (“I Saw”, 1918), contains the poem Kuruma no oto (“Noise of the Carts”), which often appears in Japanese collections of Taisho period poetry. His longer work, Mukashi no ie (“House of Long Ago”, 1929), is autobiographical, describing his aristocratic background.

== See also ==
- Japanese literature
- List of Japanese authors
