= Ozaki Kōyō =

Japanese writer (1868–1903)

- 尾崎 紅葉
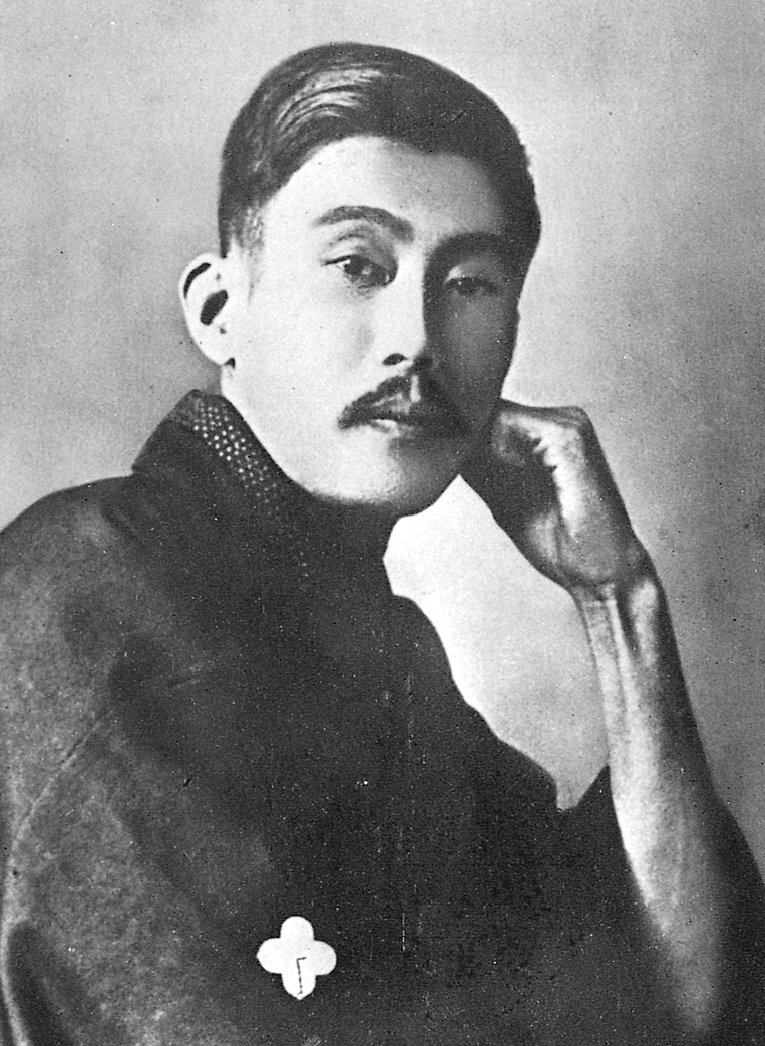
- Ozaki Kōyō
- Born: 10 January 1868; Edo, Japan
- Died: October 30, 1903 (aged 35); Tokyo, Japan
- Occupation: Writer
- Writing career
- Genres: Novels, poetry
- Notable works: Tears and Regrets (1896); The Golden Demon (1897)

Ozaki Kōyō (Note: Japanese pronunciation: [oꜜ.(d)za.kʲi, oꜜ.(d)za.kʲi̥ | koꜜː.joː, o.(d)za.kʲi koꜜː.joː, oꜜ.(d)za.kʲi̥ (|) koː.joː]) (尾崎 紅葉; January 10, 1868 – October 30, 1903) was a Japanese author and poet. His real name was Ozaki Tokutarō (尾崎 徳太郎), and he was also known by various noms de plume including Enzan (縁山) and Tochimandō (十千万堂).

== Biography ==
Ozaki was the only son of Kokusai (尾崎 谷斎), a well-known netsuke carver in the Meiji period. Ozaki is known as a classic Japanese author writing works in essays, haiku poems, and novels. He grew up in his hometown of Shibachumonmae, located in what is now part of Tokyo, until the age of four, when his mother died. The death of his mother lead him to live with his grandparents in Shibashinmei-cho. His childhood there influenced him in his choice of the penname Koyo, from Mount Koyo of Zojo Temple.

Ozaki was educated at Baisen Primary School before entering the Highschool of Tokyofu Daini Junior High School, later dropping out after two years. After he entered the Mita English School. Eventually, he enrolled at the Tokyo Imperial University. There he started publishing a literary magazine called Ken'yūsha ("Friend of the Ink Stone") in 1885 with some friends. Well-known writers Yamada Bimyō and Kawakami Bizan also had material published in the magazine.

Ozaki's most renowned works are Tajō Takon (多情多恨; "Tears and Regrets"), serialized in 1896, and Konjiki Yasha (金色夜叉; "The Golden Demon"), serialized in 1897 in the Hakubunkan magazine Nihon Taika Ronshū (日本大家論集; "Japan Expert Treatise Collection"). His works mostly appeared in the Yomiuri Shimbun, the most popular newspaper in Japan. His most notable pupils were Izumi Kyōka, a romance author who specialized in short stories and who continued to write in Ozaki's style, the author Tokuda Shūsei, and Kitada Usurai, his first female student.

Konjiki Yasha (金色夜叉; "The Golden Demon") was adapted for film numerous times, including a 1937 version by director Hiroshi Shimizu.

== See also ==
- Japanese literature
- List of Japanese authors
