= Morita Sōhei =

Japanese writer and translator (1881–1949)

- Born: 19 March 1881; Gifu, Gifu Prefecture, Japan
- Died: 14 December 1949 (aged 68); Tokyo, Japan
- Occupations: Writer, Translator
- Writing career
- Genres: novelist, translations of Western Literature

Morita Yonematsu (19 March 1881 – 14 December 1949; Japanese: 森田 米松), known under pen name Morita Sōhei (Japanese: 森田 草平, もりた そうへい), was a novelist and translator of Western literature active during the late Meiji, Taishō and early Shōwa periods of Japan.

== Early life ==
Morita was born into a farming family in what is now Gifu, Gifu Prefecture. At the age of 15, he was selected for the Imperial Japanese Navy's preparatory course, and sent to boarding school in Tokyo. He managed to avoid conscription into the military, and attended what is now Kanazawa University, where he met his future wife, and then went on to graduate from Tokyo Imperial University. He returned to Gifu, but remained drawn to literature, especially the works of Natsume Sōseki, and of various English and Russian writers, he left his wife and returned to Tokyo to pursue a career in the literary world.

== Literary career ==
Morita approached Yosano Tekkan, editor of the influential literary magazine Myōjō for assistance in an introduction to Natsume Sōseki in an effort to become accepted as one of Soseki's students. Tekkan not only introduced Morita to Soseki, but also introduced him to the famous feminist activist and author Hiratsuka Raicho.

Morita won critical acclaim and acceptance as a serious writer with his novel Baien (Smoke, 1909), a largely autobiographical account of his unhappy marriage, subsequent affair with Hiratsuka Raicho, and their unsuccessful attempt to commit double suicide in Nasushiobara, Tochigi. The novel appeared in serialized format in the Asahi Shimbun newspaper. From 1920-1930, Morita taught as a professor of English literature at Hosei University. During this time, he published a large biography of Natsume Sōseki, and the novel Rinmei (Reincarnation, 1923–1925).

His house in Setagaya, Tokyo was destroyed during the bombing of Tokyo in World War II, and he relocated to Iida, Nagano for the remainder of the war.

He turned to historical fiction in his later years, with the novel Hosokawa Garashiya fujin (1949–1950), based on the life of the famous Christian convert Hosokawa Gracia. In addition to his own writings, Morita translated the works of Fyodor Dostoevsky, Henrik Ibsen, Miguel de Cervantes, Gabriele D'Annunzio, and Giovanni Boccaccio into Japanese. Towards the end of his life, he became a self-proclaimed member of the Japan Communist Party.

Morita died of liver disease, aggravated by jaundice.

== See also ==
- Japanese literature
- List of Japanese authors
