= Kazuo Hirotsu =

Japanese novelist and literary critic

- 広津 和郎
- Born: 5 December 1891; Tokyo, Japan
- Died: 21 September 1968 (aged 76); Atami, Shizuoka, Japan
- Resting place: Yanaka Cemetery, Tokyo
- Education: Waseda University
- Occupations: Novelist, literary critic, translator
- Writing career
- Language: Japanese
- Genre: novels
- Notable awards: Noma Literary Prize (1963); Mainichi Literary Prize (1963)
- Literary movement: Proletarian literature, I novel

Kazuo Hirotsu (広津 和郎, Hirotsu Kazuo; 5 December 1891 – 21 September 1968) was a Japanese novelist, literary critic and translator active in the Shōwa period.

== Early life ==
Hirotsu was born in the Ushigome neighborhood in Tokyo as the second son of the noted novelist Hirotsu Ryurō, whose pupils included Kafū Nagai. He had problems completing Azabu Middle School due to poor health and his complete incompetence in mathematics. At the time he was also working part-time delivering newspapers, and his inability to add often meant that his parents had to make up for the short-fall in his accounts.

== Literary career ==
However, Hirotsu did show a talent for literature from an early age. His literary debut came with a short story submitted to a contest in a newspaper when he was 17 years old. The story won a prize of 10 Yen, which was a reasonable sum of money in 1908. While attending Waseda University Hirotsu started submitting articles to various literary journals. One of his classmates at Waseda was Hinatsu Kōnosuke. In 1912, Hirotsu joined Zenzō Kasai in establishing a literary magazine, Kiseki (“Miracle”), to which he contributed short stories and translated works of foreign authors. The magazine ceased publication the following year after seven editions.

In 1913, Hirotsu published a translation of Guy de Maupassant's Une Vie, which marked the beginning of a career of literary criticism and translation of various European writers. The same year, he graduated from Waseda University, and his family was evicted from their rented house due to inability to pay the rent. The following year, he was hospitalized for tuberculosis. His stepmother was also diagnosed with the disease, and his father and stepmother relocated to Nagoya, living Hirotsu at a boarding house in Tokyo, where he shared a room with Zenzō Kasai for a time, while attempting to find work as a translator and submitting stories to newspapers and magazines. Hirotsu relocated from Tokyo to coastal Kamakura, Kanagawa from 1916.

His literary career began with a short story published in 1917: Shinkeibyo Jidai (“The Neurotic Age”), in which he attacked the nihilism and moral decadence of contemporary intellectuals. A supporter of leftist politics, he was initially attracted to the Proletarian Literature Movement in the 1930s. During the 1930s he published Futari no Fukomono (“Two Unfortunate People”) and Shiji o Daite (“Embracing a Dead Child”), both objective stories, and Yamori (“Gecko”) and Nami no Ue (“On the Waves”), which belonged to the I novel genre.

In 1941, Hirotsu moved to Setagaya in Tokyo. His politics supported the Japanese government in World War II, and he was sent on a government-sponsored visit to Korea, where he met author Kim Saryan, and to Manchukuo, where he toured several Japanese settlements. In 1942, he joined the government-sponsored Japanese Cultural Protection Association, but came into conflict with Kunio Kishida, who was attempting to incorporate the Association into the Taisei Yokusankai political party. He also travelled to Nara to view various temples and antiquities in 1942. In 1944, due to the danger of air raids in Tokyo during World War II, he relocated to the resort town of Atami.

In 1946, Hirotsu was diagnosed with bladder cancer at the Atami National Hospital. While recuperating in Atami, he occasionally met with fellow Atami resident Shiga Naoya in 1948. Hirotsu became a member of the Japan Art Academy in 1949 together with Kōji Uno. In 1950, his house in Atami burned down, and he was forced to relocate to a different location, but still within Atami. On occasion, he also maintained apartments in Tokyo.

In the post-war period, Hirotsu wrote a number of biographical and autobiographical works, Ano Jidai (“Those Times”), and Nengetsu no Ashiato (“The Footsteps of Time”, 1961–1963), which won the 1963 Noma Literary Prize; however, he devoted 10 years from 1953-1963 writing an obsessively detailed defense of the alleged saboteurs in the controversial Matsukawa incident. This work was published under Izumi e no michi (“The Road to Spring”, 1953–1954) and Matsukawa Saiban (“The Matsukawa Trial”, 1954–1958). Hirotsu led a citizen's support group for the defendants, who, after twelve years in the courts, were eventually found innocent.

Hirotsu died of a heart attack at the Atami National Hospital in Atami in 1968 at the age of 76. His grave is at the Yanaka Cemetery, Tokyo.

His daughter Momoko Hirotsu (1918-1988) was also a novelist.

== Translations ==
- Hirotsu, Kazuo. Der Geist der Prosa - Literarischer Widerstand im Japan der Kriegszeit. Translated into German by Asa-Bettina Wuthenow. Munich: Iudicium (2014). 254 pages. ISBN 978-3-86205-288-2

== See also ==
- Japanese literature
- List of Japanese authors
