= List of Japanese writers =

This is an alphabetical list of writers who are Japanese, or are famous for having written in the Japanese language.

Writers are listed by the native order of Japanese names—family name followed by given name—to ensure consistency, although some writers are known by their western-ordered name.

List of Japanese writers by family name: A • B • C • D • E • F • G • H • I • J • K • M • N • O • R • S • T • U • W • Y • Z

== See also ==
- Japanese literature
- List of Japanese people
- List of Japanese women writers
- List of novelists
- Lists of authors
