= Mikihiko Nagata =

- 長田 幹彦
- Born: May 13, 1887; Tokyo, Japan
- Died: May 5, 1964 (aged 76); Tokyo, Japan
- Resting place: Kanei-ji, Ueno, Tokyo, Japan
- Education: Waseda University
- Occupation: Writer
- Writing career
- Language: Japanese
- Genres: Poetry and novels

Mikihiko Nagata (長田 幹彦, Nagata Mikihiko; May 13, 1887 - May 5, 1964) was a poet and playwright active during the Shōwa period in Japan. He also was a scriptwriter.

== Biography ==
Born in Tokyo, Nagata was the brother of fellow writer Nagata Hideo. Influenced by his brother, and his brother's associates Kitahara Hakushū and Yoshii Isamu, he also turned to poetry and literature as a career, He contributed to the literary journal Myōjō and Subaru while still a student at Waseda University, but left university without graduating and went to Hokkaido to work as a laborer at coal mines and at railroad construction sites.

Nagata and Jun'ichirō Tanizaki were close friends, even to the extent that Nagata used the pen name “Mikihiko Jun'ichirō” on some of his early works; however, after Tanizaki went to Kyoto in 1912, their relations deteriorated, and afterwards they had little contact.

Nagata is best known for his semi-factual work on the Great Kantō earthquake, Daichi wa furu ("The Earth Shakes", 1923) and for numerous works on the Gion district of Kyoto. He later turned to scriptwriting and directed a theatrical troupe. In 1947, he staged a play called Shōwa Ichidai Onna ("A Woman of the Shōwa period"), which starred the notorious Sada Abe, who had been released from prison shortly before, in a one-act dramatization of her crime.

Nagata died of pneumonia in 1964, and his grave is at the Kanei-ji Cemetery in Ueno, Tokyo.

== See also ==
- Japanese literature
- List of Japanese authors
