= Otemoyan =

Otemoyan is a Japanese folk song (min'yo) from Kumamoto Prefecture. It is played by mass performers dancing in the streets of Kumamoto in the summer. It is usually accompanied by shamisen, taiko drums and other percussion, and the Japanese used has a southern Kumamoto accent.

== Origin ==
Originally, it was a song played during drinking parties with geisha girls. Several hypotheses have been formulated on the origin of the name and the most creditable one among them is that Otemoyan was a girl named Tominaga (1868-1935) who really lived near the present Kumamoto Station. The writer/composer was Ine Nagata, a teacher of Shamisen and Japanese dances. This song made a debut made by Akasaka Koume in 1935. The oldest reference of this song is in 5 Pairs of Shoes, a book published in 1907 by five promising men of letters, Tekkan Yosano, Mokutaro Kinoshita (pen-name of Masao Ōta (太田正雄, Ōta Masao)), Kitahara Hakushu, Hirano Banri and Yoshii Isamu who visited Kumamoto at that time.

== Meaning ==
The song is about Chimo, a young maiden in the Meiji period, who is in love with a man with smallpox scars on his face. They just got married but she hesitates to hold an open wedding ceremony due to possible comments made by the townspeople about her new husband's look. Anyhow, she is still charmed by him regardless of his look.

Since lyrics of this song include old Kumamoto local accents, it is hard to understand for people today. Many people understand this song in many ways.

This song is about a young woman who recently got married but in love with somebody else in a different town - she explains she has not "officially" got married because her husband is not nice looking. Lyrics comically describe how the young cheerful lady is enjoying her young days attracting many guys - who she is explaining "ugly" and "not her type".

== 1st Stanza ==
Japanese:
おてもやん あんたこの頃嫁
入りしたではないかいな

嫁入りしたことぁしたばってん
ご亭どんが ぐじゃっぺだるけん
まだ杯ゃせんじゃった

ぐじゃっぺ=菊目石状態。痘瘡の跡。

村役 鳶役 肝煎りどん
あん人たちの おらすけんで
あとはどうなときゃなろたい
川端町っちゃん きゃめぐろ
春日ぼうぶりゃどんたちゃ
尻ひっぱって 花盛り 花盛り
ピーチクパーチク雲雀の子
げんぱく茄子のいがいなどん

Romaji:
Otemoyan anta konogoro
Yomeiri shita dewa naikaina

Yomeiri shita kot'a shita batten
Goteidon ga gujappe daruken
mada sakazukya senjatta

(gujappe: kikumeishi jotai. toso no ato. )

Murayaku tobiyaku kimoiridon
An' hitotachi no orasukende
Ato wa dou nato kya narotai
Kawabatamachan kya meguro
Kasuga bou burya dontacha
Shiri hippatte hanazakari hanasakari
Piichiku paachiku hibari no ko
Genpaku nasubi no i ga ina don

Translation:
Miss Otemo
Weren't you married just recently?

As a matter of fact, I was. However,
Since my husband's face is all pockmarked,
We haven't had a proper ceremony.

(gujappe: pockmarks due to small pox)

Our village is replete with busybodies.
Those people will take care everything, .
So no worry.
Let's go walk around the Kawabata downtown.
Guys look like ripe pumpkins
They all look at me - who are like heaps of flowers in the fields.
Chirpetty tweet-tweet, the skylarks sing
I am not crazy about guys who look like the eggplants show their thorny branches.

== 2nd Stanza ==
Japanese:

一つ山越え
も一つ山超え あの山越えて
私ゃあんたに惚れちょるばい
惚れちょるばってん 言われんたい
追々彼岸も近まれば
若者衆も寄らすけん
くまんどんのよじょもん詣りに
ゆるゆる話をきゃあしゅうたい
男振りには惚れんばな
煙草入れの銀金具が
それもそもそも因縁たい。
アカチャカベッチャカ
チャカチャカチャー

Romaji:
Hitotsu yama koe
Mo hitotsu yama koe, ano yama koete
'Atash'a anta ni horechorubai
Horechoru batten iwarentai
Oioi Higan mo chikamareba
Wakamon'shu mo yorasuken
Kuman' don no yojomon myarini
Yuruyuru hanashi wo chashutai
Otokoburi niwa horenbana
Tabakoire no ginkanaguga
Soremo so'mo so'mo in'entai
Akachaka becchaka
Chaka chaka cha!

Translation:
Go over a mountain
Go over another mountain, over that one too.
I'm so in love with you
Head over heels, though I can't confess.
As the Feast of the Equinox approaches,
The youth will gather in throngs.
At the Yojomon Pilgrimage in Kumamoto
I'll talk to them about my troubles.
It wasn't your looks that charmed me,
I saw the way you smoked your tobacco pipe,
The rest is history.
Dum diddle dee diddle
Diddle diddle daa.
