= Haruo Satō (novelist) =

Japanese novelist and poet

Haruo Sato
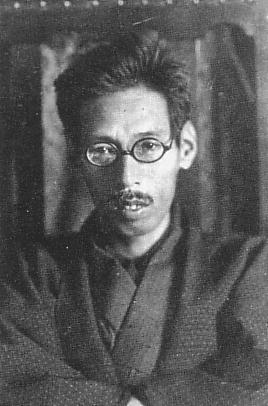
- Born: 9 April 1892; Shingū, Wakayama, Japan
- Died: 6 May 1964 (aged 72); Tokyo, Japan
- Occupation: Writer
- Writing career
- Pen name: Sato Chomei (潮鳴), Nokayajin (農火野人)
- Genres: Novel, poem, Criticism, Essay, Biography, Children's literature, Play, Waka
- Movement: Aestheticism

Haruo Sato (佐藤 春夫, Satō Haruo; 9 April 1892 – 6 May 1964) was a Japanese novelist and poet active during the Taishō and Shōwa periods of Japan. Centered on his elegant and luminous poetry and novels imbued with weariness and melancholy, his literary output spanned a wide range of genres, including literary criticism, essays, biographical works, children’s stories, plays, and waka poetry; he was highly prolific from the late Meiji period through the mid-Shōwa period. He used the pen names Chomei and Satako, and also used his literary pseudonym was Nokayajin. She was the first Honorary Citizen of Shingu. He was a member of the Japan Art Academy, a Person of Cultural Merit, and a recipient of the Order of Culture. His works are known for their explorations of melancholy.

He was born into a family of physicians. Developing a love for literature during his middle school years, he contributed poems to the literary magazine Subaru. Admiring Nagai Kafū, he enrolled at Keio University and studied under Ikuta Chōkō. He also joined the Tōkyō Shinshi-sha (Tokyo New Poetry Society), led by Yosano Tekkan and Yosano Akiko.

He gained recognition with works such as The House of the Spanish Dog (西班牙犬の家) (1917) and established his standing as an author with Melancholy in the Countryside (田園の憂鬱) (1917) and Melancholy in the City (都会の憂鬱) (1922). During this period, he maintained a close friendship with Tanizaki Jun’ichirō; however, a conflict involving Tanizaki’s wife led to a permanent rift between the two men—a time during which he produced works such as A Collection of Poems on Martyrdom for Love (殉情詩集) (1921).

After World War II, he authored biographical novels about literary figures—including Akiko Mandala (晶子曼荼羅) (1954)—as well as various essays. In 1964, he collapsed while recording a radio segment at his home and subsequently passed away from a myocardial infarction.

He won the 4th Yomiuri Prize.

== Early life ==
=== Student years ===
Born in Shingu, Higashimuro District, Wakayama Prefecture, as the eldest son of the physician Toyotaro Sato (known by his pen name Kyosui) and his wife, Masayo. His mother, Masayo, was a daughter of the Takeda family—descendants of former retainers of the Kishu Domain who had served as Oniwa-bugyo (garden magistrates). For generations, the Sato family had practiced medicine in the town of Shimosato within the Kishu domain; Toyotaro represented the ninth generation to do so. Toyotaro was also a man of letters who deeply admired the poet Masaoka Shiki.

In April 1898, he enrolled in Shingu First Ordinary Elementary School (later known as Tankaku Elementary School). During his time at Wakayama Prefectural Shingu Middle School (now Wakayama Prefectural Shingu High School), he contributed a piece titled Oraba Kago to the school alumni magazine under the pen name Sato Chomei. In 1908, he published six tanka poems in the Kumano Jitsugyo Shimbun and submitted a poem titled Kaze (Wind) to the literary magazine Myojo; his tanka was selected for inclusion by the poet Ishikawa Takuboku. He also became a member of the Hamafuyu poetry circle—led by Hikotaro Wagai—where he published works (a mix of tanka and poetry) titled Basha/Shokudo (Carriage/Dining Room). Around this time, his father temporarily closed his medical practice and moved to the Nakagawa District of the Tokachi Province in Hokkaido to manage a farm. During this period, he frequently published tanka and essays on tanka theory in various journals and newspapers, including Shumi, Bunko, Shinsei, and the Kumano Shimpo. In 1909, he contributed tanka to the inaugural issue of the literary magazine Subaru. It was here that he became acquainted with Ikuta Choko, Hiroshi Yosano, and Hakutei Ishii. During this same period, he was deemed a ringleader in a student strike and was subsequently given an indefinite suspension.

Following his graduation in 1910, he moved to Tokyo, where he studied under Nagae Choko and joined Hiroshi Yosano’s poetry group, the Shinshisha. It was here that he met fellow literary circle member Daigaku Horiguchi. Together, they sat for the entrance examination for the First Higher School (Dai-ichi Kōtō Gakkō), but he abandoned the exam midway and instead enrolled in the preparatory course of the Faculty of Letters at Keio University. There, he studied under Nagai Kafū—who was a professor at the time—and also became acquainted with Katsuzō Ubukata. He had a bitter, antagonistic relationship with Mantarō Kubota, a fellow student under the same mentor; however, after Kafū’s death, the discovery of his diary, Danchōtei Nichijō—which contained disparaging remarks about both Kubota and Haruo—led the two men to reconcile.

Beginning in 1909, he published lyrical and socially-oriented poems in the journals Subaru and Mita Bungaku, drawing the attention of literary critics. On January 24, 1911, Seinosuke Ōishi—a physician from his hometown—was executed as a defendant in the "High Treason Incident" (Taigyaku Jiken) for his alleged association with Shūsui Kōtoku and others. In May of that same year, he published a poem titled The Death of a Fool (Gusha no Shi) in Subaru, in which he expressed his sentiments regarding the event; the work earned him significant acclaim.

== Selected works ==
- The House of a Spanish Dog, 西班牙犬の家, 1914.
- Melancholy in the Country, 田園の憂鬱, 1919.
