= Subaru (literary magazine) =

Japanese literary magazine (1909–1913)

Subaru スバル
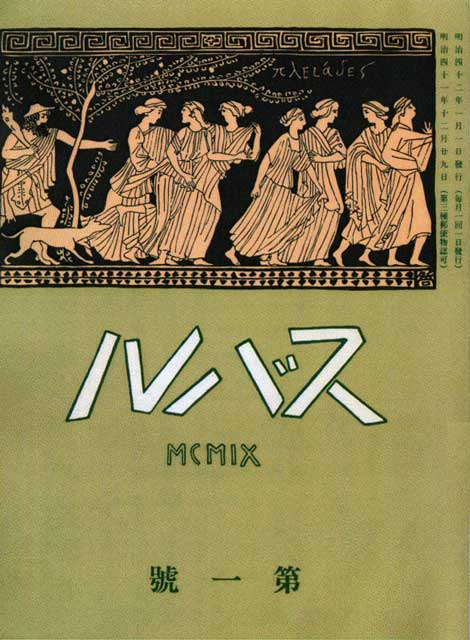
- Subaru 1st issue
- Editor: Ishikawa Takuboku
- Categories: Literary magazine
- Frequency: Monthly
- First issue: January 1909
- Final issue: December 1913
- Company: Subaru (昴)
- Country: Japan
- Language: Japanese

Subaru (スバル) was a literary magazine published monthly in Japan between January 1909 and December 1913. The name of the publisher was Subaru (昴), written in kanji as opposed to the magazine title written in katakana.

Subaru was the spiritual successor to the better-known and longer-running magazine Myōjō. It mainly focused on the publication of poetry and was known for its advocacy of the trend of romanticism in Japanese literature in the late Meiji period (1868 – 1912). It was priced at 30 sen (0.3 yen) and ultimately published 60 issues in total.

== Overview ==
In 1909, after Myōjō ceased publication, Mori Ōgai and a few other prominent Myōjō writers including Tekkan Yosano and Akiko Yosano came together to publish a new magazine that would become Subaru. Ishikawa Takuboku initially served as editor. The magazine was noted for publishing works by Ishikawa, as well as Mokutaro Kinoshita, Kōtarō Takamura, Yoshii Isamu (1886 – 1960), and Hakushū Kitahara (the latter leaving Myōjō in January 1908 was one of the factors contributing to its going out of print). Anti-Naturalist and Romantic writings were most prominent, and writers known for having their works published in Subaru were known as Subaru-ists (スバル派, Subaru-ha).

Among the works Mori Ōgai published in the magazine were The Wild Geese, Vita Sexualis, and Seinen. Yoshii first published Sake hogai and Gogo san-ji in the magazine. The complete run of Subaru was reprinted in facsimile in 1965 by the publishing house Rinsen Shoten.
