= Woodpecker Detective's Office =

Japanese novel and anime series

- Novel cover

啄木鳥探偵處 (Kitsutsuki Tantei-dokoro)
- Genre: Mystery
- Novel
- Written by: Kei Ii
- Published: 1999
- Anime television series
- Directed by: Shinpei Ezaki (Chief); Tomoe Makino
- Written by: Taku Kishimoto
- Music by: MONACA
- Studio: Liden Films
- Licensed by: Crunchyroll: SEA: Muse Communication
- Original network: Tokyo MX, BS Fuji, CS Family Gekijo
- English network: SEA: Animax Asia
- Original run: April 13, 2020 – June 29, 2020
- Episodes: 12

Woodpecker Detective's Office (啄木鳥探偵處, Kitsutsuki Tantei-dokoro) is a 1999 Japanese mystery novel written by Kei Ii. An anime television series adaptation by Liden Films aired between April and June 2020.

== Setting ==
The novel is set in the Meiji era, and follows fictionalized versions of the poet Takuboku Ishikawa and the linguist Kyōsuke Kindaichi. Ishikawa is a private investigator. They both investigate a supposed ghost haunting at the Ryōunkaku skyscraper.

== Characters ==
Takuboku Ishikawa (石川 啄木, Ishikawa Takuboku)
Voiced by: Shintarō Asanuma
Kyōsuke Kindaichi (金田一 京助, Kindaichi Kyōsuke)
Voiced by: Takahiro Sakurai
Kodo Nomura (野村 胡堂, Nomura Kodō)
Voiced by: Kenjiro Tsuda
Ryūnosuke Akutagawa (芥川 龍之介, Akutagawa Ryūnosuke)
Voiced by: Yukiya Hayashi
Isamu Yoshii (吉井 勇, Yoshii Isamu)
Voiced by: Sōma Saitō
Sakutaro Hagiwara (萩原 朔太郎, Hagiwara Sakutarō)
Voiced by: Yūichirō Umehara
Taro Hirai (平井 太郎, Hirai Tarō)
Voiced by: Kenshō Ono
Bokusui Wakayama (若山 牧水, Wakayama Bokusui)
Voiced by: Makoto Furukawa
Mori Ōgai (森 林太郎, Mori Rintarō)
Voiced by: Junichi Suwabe

== Media ==
=== Anime ===
An anime television series adaptation was announced on March 22, 2019. The series is animated by Liden Films, with Tomoe Makino serving as director and Shinpei Ezaki serving as chief director. Taku Kishimoto handled series composition, Shuichi Hara designed the characters, and MONACA composed the series' music. Muse Communication licensed the series in Southeast Asia and aired it on Animax Asia and later streamed on Muse Asia YouTube channel. It aired between April 13 and June 29, 2020, on Tokyo MX, BS Fuji, and CS Family Gekijo. Makoto Furukawa will perform the series' opening theme song "Honjitsu mo Makoto ni Seiten Nari", while NOW ON AIR will perform the series' ending theme song "Gondola no Uta".

No.	Title	Original release date
1	"A Pleasant Occupation"; Transliteration: "Kokoroyoi shigoto" (Japanese: こころよい仕事)	April 13, 2020
2	"A Red-light District Woman"; Transliteration: "Makutsu no Onna" (Japanese: 魔窟の女)	April 20, 2020
3	"Casual Remarks"; Transliteration: "Sarigenai kotoba" (Japanese: さりげない言葉)	April 27, 2020
4	"Strange Stories of the High Tower"; Transliteration: "Kōtō kitan" (Japanese: 高塔奇譚)	May 4, 2020
5	"Accursed Beast"; Transliteration: "Nikui an chikushō" (Japanese: にくいあん畜生)	May 11, 2020
6	"Honeysuckle"; Transliteration: "Suikazura" (Japanese: 忍冬(すいかずら))	May 18, 2020
7	"Gentleman Thief"; Transliteration: "Shinshi tōzoku" (Japanese: 紳士盗賊)	May 25, 2020
8	"Young Man"; Transliteration: "Wakaki otoko" (Japanese: 若きおとこ)	June 1, 2020
9	"Events Fulfilled"; Transliteration: "Tsukamatsu togeshi koto" (Japanese: 仕遂げしこと)	June 8, 2020
10	"Over Many Mountains and Rivers"; Transliteration: "Iku yamakawa" (Japanese: 幾山河)	June 15, 2020
11	"The Hour of Demons"; Transliteration: "Omagatoki" (Japanese: 逢魔が時)	June 22, 2020
12	"Pale Blue Skies"; Transliteration: "Sōkū" (Japanese: 蒼空)	June 29, 2020
