= 5 Pairs of Shoes =

Essays on travel and culture in Southeast Asia

5 Pairs of Shoes is a series of essays of travel literature written by Tekkan Yosano and his students Mokutaro Kinoshita, Kitahara Hakushu, Hirano Banri and Yoshii Isamu, which was published in 1907 in a Tokyo newspaper. Because all five authors later became famous poets, the essays aroused an interest in culture related to Southeast Asia and Christianity.

In 1907, the five poets traveled through northern Kyushu and later published 29 essays in the Tokyo newspaper Tokyo 26 Shimbun. The writers were not identified in the newspaper. On August 9, they travelled on foot for a distance of 32 km to Oe-mura, Amakusa, Kumamoto. They stayed at Takasagoya Inn. On August 10, they met French Catholic Father Frederic Louis Garnier (1860-1941）, who preached Catholicism in Amakusa from the late Meiji period to the early Shōwa period. On August 29, they were invited to a party at a Japanese restaurant on Lake Ezu, Kumamoto and enjoyed a boat cruise. Several reporters attended the party. The essays contain the entirety of an otemoyan that was sung by a girl.
