= Hideo Nagata =

Japanese poet, playwright, and scriptwriter

Hideo Nagata (長田 秀雄, Nagata Hideo) (13 May 1885 – 5 May 1949) was a poet and playwright in Shōwa period Japan. He also was a scriptwriter.

Born in Tokyo, Nagata was the son of a Shinto priest at the Kikuchi Jinja. Interested in literature and poetry from an early age, he developed his own style of modern poetry and was ranked alongside Kitahara Hakushu and Kinoshita Mokutaro by the literary magazine Myōjō ("Bright Star"). He later turned his creative talents to the modern theater, and then to the relatively new medium of cinema.

He died in 1949, and his grave is at the Somei Cemetery in Sugamo, Tokyo.
