= Yoshikiyo =

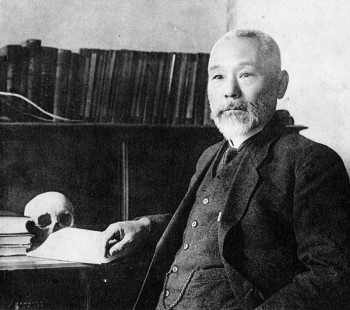
- Yoshikiyo Koganei (1859–1944), Japanese anatomist and anthropologist
- Pronunciation: joɕikʲijo (IPA)
- Gender: Male

Origin
- Origin: Japanese
- Meaning: Different meanings depending on the kanji used

Other names
- Alternative spelling: Yosikiyo (Kunrei-shiki) Yosikiyo (Nihon-shiki) Yoshikiyo (Hepburn)

Yoshikiyo is a masculine Japanese given name.

== Written forms ==
Yoshikiyo can be written using many different combinations of kanji characters. Here are some examples:

- 義清, "justice, pure"
- 義潔, "justice, pure"
- 佳清, "skilled, pure"
- 佳潔, "skilled, pure"
- 善清, "virtuous, pure"
- 善潔, "virtuous, pure"
- 吉清, "good luck, pure"
- 吉潔, "good luck, pure"
- 良清, "good, pure"
- 良潔, "good, pure"
- 恭清, "respectful, pure"
- 嘉清, "excellent, pure"
- 嘉潔, "excellent, pure"
- 能清, "capacity, pure"
- 喜清, "rejoice, pure"
- 芳清, "fragrant/virtuous, pure"
- 義紀代, "justice, chronicle, generation"

The name can also be written in hiragana よしきよ or katakana ヨシキヨ.

== Notable people with the name ==
- Yoshikiyo Koganei (小金井 良精; 1859–1944), Japanese anatomist and anthropologist
- Yoshikiyo Kuboyama (久保山 由清; born 1976), Japanese footballer
- Yoshikiyo Minamoto (源 義清), Japanese samurai
- Yoshikiyo Murakami (村上 義清; 1501–1573), Japanese daimyō
- Yoshikiyo Sasaki (佐々木 義清; 1161–1242), Japanese samurai
