= Midaregami =

1901 poem collection written by Yosano Akiko

Midaregami みだれ髪
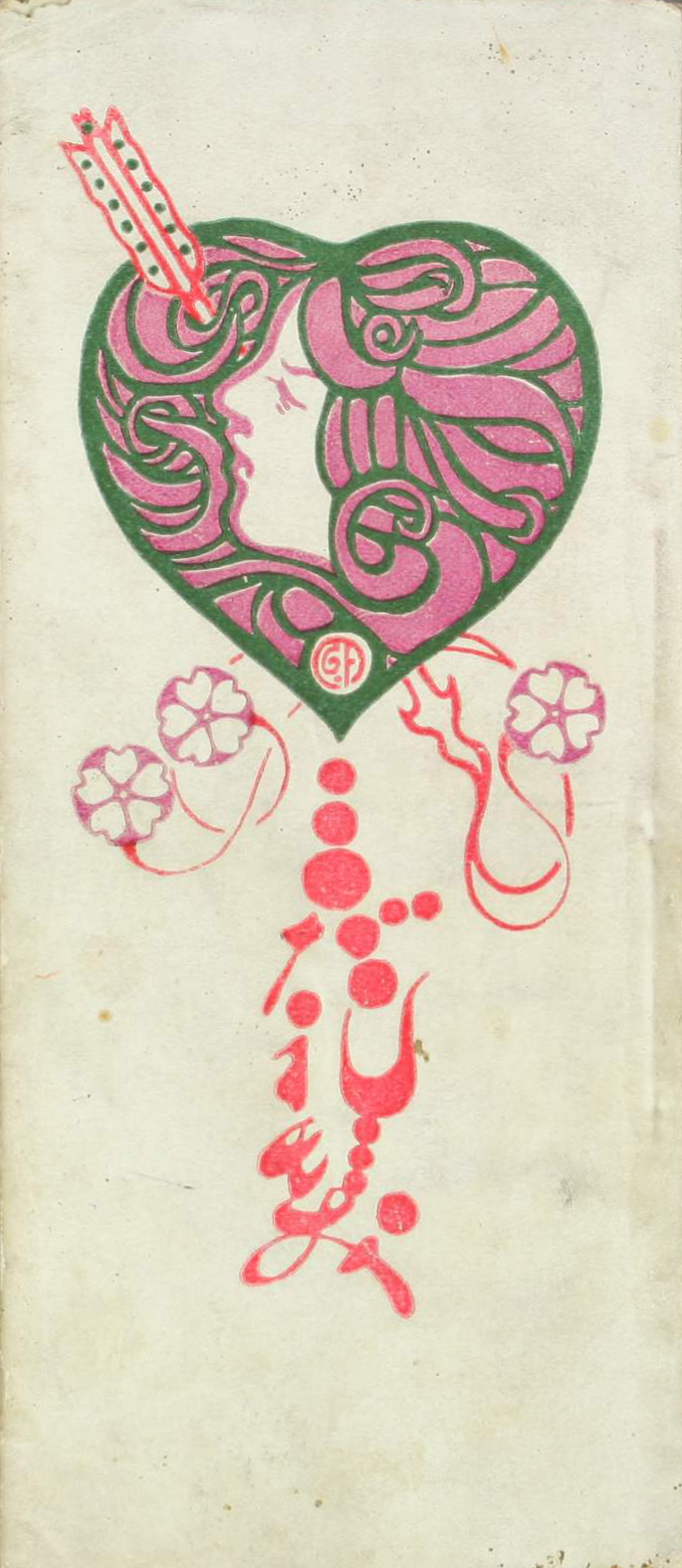
- Author: Akiko Yosano
- Cover artist: Fujishima Takeji
- Language: Japanese
- Genre: Poetry anthology
- Publication date: August 15, 1901
- Publication place: Japan
- Pages: 136

Midaregami (みだれ髪, Tangled hair) is a collection of tanka (短歌, “Short poem”), written by the Japanese writer Yosano Akiko during the Meiji period in 1901. Although later celebrated for its softly feminist depictions of a woman's sexual freedom, her work suffered heavy criticism at the time of publication for subverting contemporary gender norms.

== Introduction ==
Before their publication as a collection, Yosano's 399 poems were written as a diary of the imagery and inner workings of her life during the time of her sexual awakening and courtship. Each poem presented a vivid picture of a lively, free woman who did not wait for others to decide whom she could love. She possessed an independent sexuality and sought out love on her own time and her own terms, rather than waiting for a man to come to her. Yosano emphasized the beauty of her female subject by descriptions of breasts, skin, lips, shoulders, and black hair.

The young woman inhabits an unconventionally self-centered world, and is first encountered combing her long black hair.

Sono ko hatachi kushi ni nagaruru kurokami no ogori no haru no utsukushiki kana
That child of 20, a comb in the waves of her black hair, takes pride in the beauty of her spring.

This hair later on becomes tangled with sin, in which the now anguished woman wanders like a lost lamb. She turns to the sutras and Buddha for redemption, but eventually, tangled hair and all, the young woman is able to hold onto her love without the help of religion.

== Influences and symbolism ==
Midaregami is, first of all, a diary influenced by the poet's encounter with Tekkan Yosano, her eventual husband. Of the 399 poems, 385 of them are of her love for Tekkan, of which the initial love affair (Tekkan had a common law wife at the time) and elopement are present within the poems.

Although inspired by real life, many references to Japan's artistic and literary heritage are also present. Midaregami often depicts the image of the heroine Ukifune from the classic The Tale of Genji, which Yosano had read avidly during her youth. Many of the poems also use the same expressions as those found within The Tale of Genji, and use the imagery of hair to express a character’s fortunes and inner feelings.

kurogami no sensuji no kami no midare kami katsu omoi midare omoi midareru
black hair's thousand strains, tangled hair and tangled feelings

Long black hair appears in classical literary works to symbolize the nobility, beauty, grace, and sexuality of women. Breasts, lips, skin, and shoulders are used as a symbol for the independent beauty and strength of the young woman. At one point the image of a sheep is taken as a metaphor for the young woman losing her way. Throughout the collection there are many words which have religious undertones in Buddhism, and the sutras are directly referenced in one poem.

== Cultural impact ==
Midaregami challenged the feudal view of women as those responsible for the production of children and the management of the family's domestic life. During the early twentieth century, the current status of women in Japan was described by the phrase "onna wa sangai ni ie nashi" ("women have no home in their three lives"), which meant that the actions of women in their expected roles as daughter, housewife, and mother were controlled by the patriarchal trinity of father, husband, and son. Yosano's poems turned the symbolic reference of the female body from motherhood and child-feeding to an expression of natural beauty, especially for young women.

Midaregami also subverted the contemporary norms of feminine modesty and sexual secrecy. The subject of her poems openly and freely expresses her sexual desire to her lover.

yawa hada no atsuki chishio ni fure mo mi de sabishikarazuya michi o toku kimi
Not even once have you touched my soft flesh, coursing hot blood. Don't you feel a bit lonesome, you–always preaching your way?

Because of these explicit admissions and the radical departure from cultural norms, critics of the time denounced Yosano and her work. However, the collection served as an inspiration for women during the early twentieth century, at a time when Japanese feminists were beginning to make their positions known.
