= Shibue =

Shibue (written: 渋江) is a Japanese surname. Notable people with the surname include:

- Shibue Chūsai (渋江 抽斎, 1805–1858), Japanese physician
- Jouji Shibue (渋江 譲二, born 1983), Japanese model and actor
