= Mokutarō Kinoshita =

Japanese writer, scholar, and dermatologist (1885–1945)

Mokutaro Kinoshita or Masao Ōta
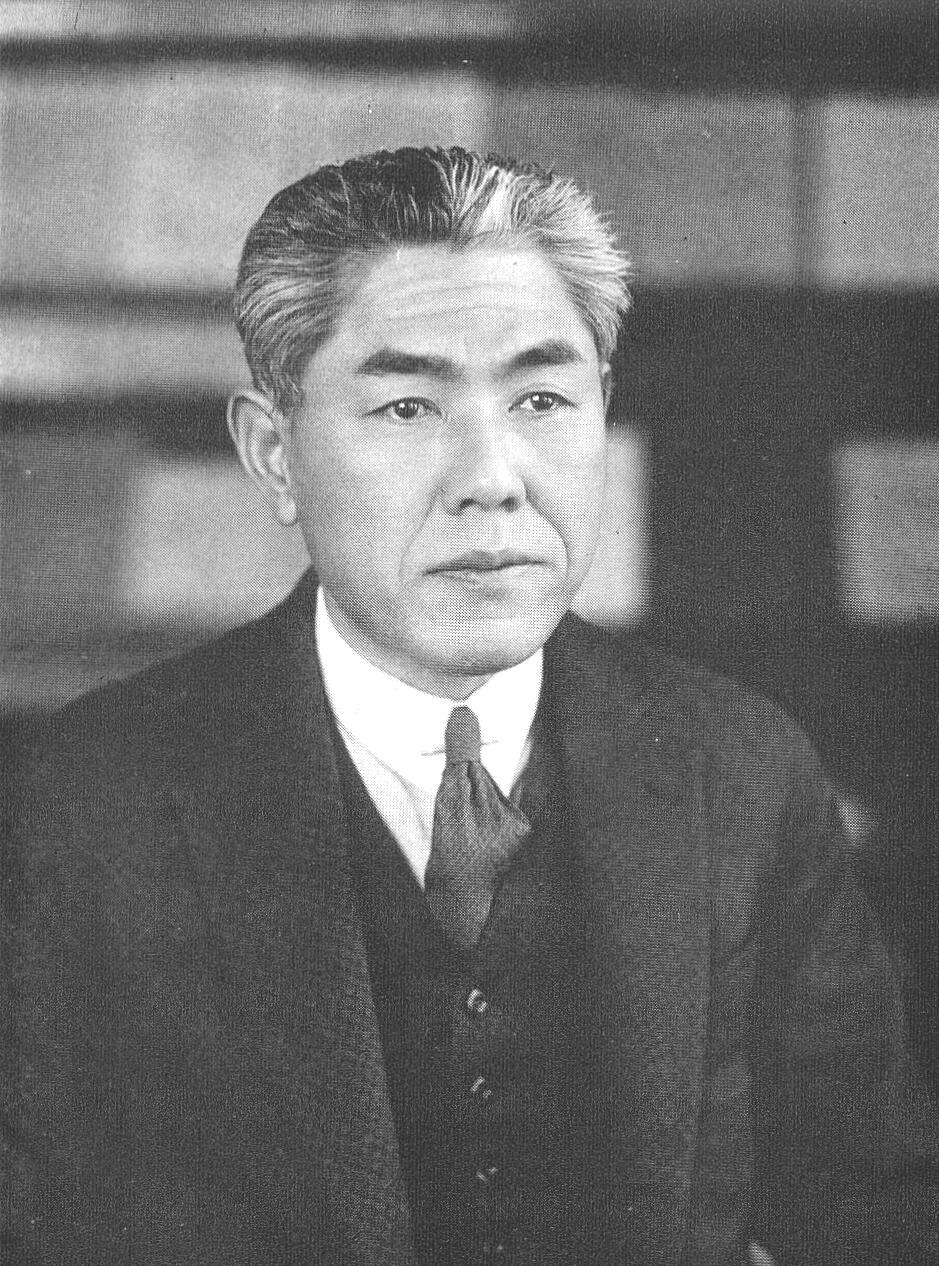
- Mokutaro Kinoshita in 1934
- Born: Masao Ōta; August 1, 1885; Itō, Shizuoka, Japan
- Died: October 15, 1945 (aged 60); Tokyo, Japan
- Occupations: Author and Physician (dermatologist), Professor of Dermatology (South Manchuria Medical College, Aichi Medical College, Tohoku Imperial University, Tokyo Imperial University
- Writing career
- Pen name: Mokutaro Kinoshita
- Period: Taisho era and Showa era
- Genres: Novels, dramas, poems, historian, translation, literary critic, scientific papers on infection, especially leprosy
- Notable works: Izumiya Somemonoten, Nanbanjimonzen, Nevus of Ota
- Literary movement: Pan-no-kai (Romanticism)
- Website: city.ito.shizuoka.jp/hp/page000005800/hpg000005750.htm

Mokutarō Kinoshita (木下 杢太郎, Kinoshita Mokutarō; August 1, 1885 – October 15, 1945) was the pen-name of a Japanese author, dramaturge, poet, art historian and literary critic, as well as a licensed doctor specializing in dermatology during Taishō and early Shōwa period Japan. His other pen names included Hori Kason (堀花村), Chika Isshakusei (地下一尺生), Sōnan (葱南) and others. As professor of dermatology and a noted leprosy researcher, he served at four universities (South Manchuria Medical College, Aichi Medical College, Tohoku Imperial University, Tokyo Imperial University).

== Biography ==
Kinoshita was born in what is now part of Itō, Shizuoka as Masao Ōta (太田正雄, Ōta Masao). He moved to Tokyo at the age of 13 to pursue studies in German, during which time he was exposed to German literature and history. In 1906 entered the Medical School of Tokyo Imperial University to pursue a medical career and to translate literary works and to cultivate contacts in the literary world. In 1907, he met Tekkan Yosano and was invited to become a member of the Myōjō literary circle, to which he contributed translations and original works. In 1908 he was one of the founding members of the Pan-no-kai (パンの会, Gathering of Pan) literary circle, through which he became acquainted with Kafū Nagai, Rokuzan Ogiwara, Kaoru Osanai, Kōtarō Takamura, Jun'ichirō Tanizaki, Bin Ueda and other noted figures in the Japanese literary and artistic world. In 1909, he assisted Takuboku Ishikawa in the production of the literary magazine Subaru.

Bin Ueda introduced Kinoshita to Mori Ōgai, who suggested that he should concentrate on literature, as his reputation was becoming widespread, but that if he should continue to pursue medicine, he should specialize in dermatology. Kinoshita chose both and studied under the respected Keizo Dohi, the first professor of dermatology at Tokyo Imperial University, where he became interested in research on leprosy. He used the pen-name of Kinoshita for writing and his real name of Ota for his medical career. One of his main topics of interest was the history of Japanese Christianity in the 16th century. He wrote a play titled Christian Story (切支丹物, Kirisitan Mono) which depicted the Kirishitan in feudal Japan.

In 1916, at age 31, he was named professor of dermatology at South Manchuria Medical University and earned his Ph.D. based on the culture of Malassetia furfur. In 1920 he left Tokyo Imperial University to study mycology at the Sorbonne and Hôpital Saint-Louis and at the University of Lyon in France. He remained in France until 1924 and became fluent in French. He became known for the “Classification of Ota and Langeron”, based on morphology. His observations were very exact and, according to Hideyo Yamaguchi, this classification closely resembled the classification based on genes. In 1924, he was named Professor of Dermatology at Aichi Medical University. In 1926, he went to Tohoku Imperial University.

He attended an international leprosy meeting in Bangkok which revived his interest in the condition. Knowing that Kensuke Mitsuda had studied and described the “Mitsuda reaction” (Lepromin reaction), he lobbied for the publication of an international journal. Finally Hayashi Fumio wrote the first article on the Mitsuda reaction in its first issue. He opposed the prevalent practice in Japan of segregating leprosy patients into sanatoriums. In 1937, he returned to Tokyo Imperial University. His interest in leprosy increased and he performed experimental works intended for the inoculation of leprosy which failed. In 1938 he first presented the case which was later named Nevus of Ota in 1939. The Nevus of Ota is a birthmark, mostly seen in Mongoloid people. In 1941, he was awarded the Legion of Honour from the Vichy French government for his work on leprosy in French Indochina. In 1944, he participated in medical conferences held in Shanghai and Nanjing.

In October 1945, he died of gastric cancer. His grave is in Tama Cemetery. The house where he was born is preserved as the Kinoshita Mokutaro Memorial House.

== See also ==
- Leprosy in Japan

== Major works ==
- The Death of Youth (少年の死 Shonen no shi, 1915)
- Sukanpo (すかんぽ, 1945)
- On The Front of Christian Church (南蛮寺門前 Nanban ji monzen, 1909)
- Memories of Gathering of Pan (パンの会の回想 Pan no kai no kaiso, 1926)
- Binding (本の装釘 Hon no sotei, 1942)
