= Mari Mori =

Japanese writer

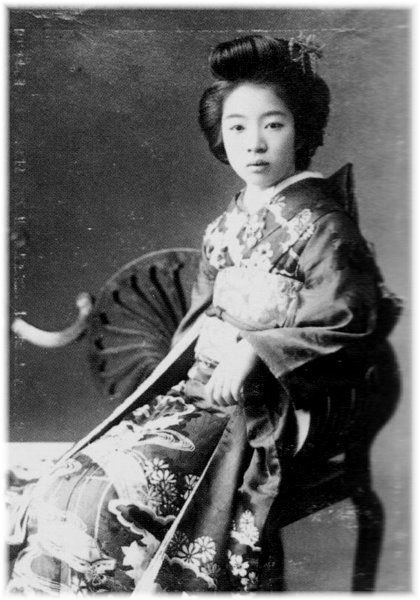
- Mori in her youth, around 1920s
- Born: 7 January 1903
- Died: 6 June 1987 (aged 84)
- Occupation: author
- Notable work: A Lovers' Forest; The Room Filled with Sweet Honey

Mari Mori (森 茉莉, Mori Mari; 7 January 1903 – 6 June 1987) was a Japanese author, best known for writing male homosexual romances.

== Early life and family ==
Mari Mori was born in Hongō, Tokyo. Her father was novelist Mori Ōgai.

== Career ==
Mori won the Japan Essayist Club Award in 1957 for a collection of essays called My Father's Hat. She began a movement of writing about male homosexual passion (tanbi shousetsu, literally "aesthetic novels") in 1961 with A Lovers' Forest, 恋人たちの森 (koibito tachi no mori), which won the Tamura Toshiko Prize. Later works include I Don't Go on Sundays (1961) and The Bed of Dead Leaves (1962).

She was greatly influenced by her father; in A Lover's Forest, the older man can be seen as imbued with the same virtues and honor as she saw in her father. An older man and younger boy are trademarks of Mari Mori's work. The older man is extremely rich, powerful, wise, and spoils the younger boy. In The Lover's Forest, for example, the older man, Guido, is 38 or so, and Paulo is 17 or 18. (However, he is not yet 19, the age that Mori was when her father died). Paulo is extraordinarily beautiful, prone to lounge lazily, and has a lack of willpower in all but the field of his pleasure. (Guido dies when Paolo is 19, and Paulo subsequently falls in love with a man who's been waiting in the wings, another one just like Guido). New York University Professor Keith Vincent has called her a "Japanese Electra", referring to the Electra complex counterpart put forth by Carl Jung to Sigmund Freud's Oedipal complex.

In 1975 her novel The Room Filled with Sweet Honey (甘い蜜の部屋, Amai Mitsu no Heya) won the 3rd Izumi Kyōka Prize for Literature.

== Personal life ==
Her first husband was Tamaki Yamada (1893-1943), an assistant professor of French literature and librarian at the Tokyo Imperial University who co-founded the University of Tokyo Buddhist Literature Department, whom she married in 1919 and divorced in 1927, having had two children. Her second husband was Akira Sato (佐藤彰 Satō Akira).

Mori Mari died of heart failure on 6 June 1987.

== Selected works ==
=== Novels and essays ===
- Chichi no Bōshi (父の帽子), 1957
- Kutsu no Oto (靴の音), 1958
- Nōkaishoku no Sakana (濃灰色の魚), 1959
- Koibito-tachi no Mori (恋人たちの森), 1961
- Kareha no Nedoko (枯葉の寝床), 1962
- Zeitaku Binbō (贅沢貧乏), 1963
- Kioku no E (記憶の絵), 1968
- Watashi no Bi no Sekai (私の美の世界), 1968
- Amai Mitsu no Heya (甘い蜜の部屋), 1975

==== Posthumous publication ====
- Best of Dokkiri Channel (ベスト・オブ・ドッキリチャンネル), 1994
- Maria no Kimagure Kaki (マリアの気紛れ書き), 1995
- Ma ri no Hitorigoto (魔利のひとりごと), 1997
- Binbō Savarin (貧乏サヴァラン), 1998
- Boyaki to Ikari no Maria: Aru Henshū-sha e no Tegami (ぼやきと怒りのマリア ある編集者への手紙), 1998
- Maria no Unuborekagami (マリアのうぬぼれ鏡), 2000
- Maria no Kūsō Ryokō (マリアの空想旅行), 2006
- Mori Mari: Watashi no Naka no Alice no Sekai (森茉莉 私の中のアリスの世界), 2010
- Kōcha to Bara no Hibi (紅茶と薔薇の日々), 2016
- Zeitaku Binbō no Osharejō (贅沢貧乏のお洒落帖), 2016
- Kōfuku wa Tada Watashi no Heya no Naka dake ni (幸福はただ私の部屋の中だけに), 2017
- Kuroneko Juliet no Hanashi (黒猫ジュリエットの話), 2017
- Chichi to Watashi: Ren'ai no Yōna Mono (父と私 恋愛のようなもの), 2018

=== Collections ===
- Mori Mari: Roman to Essay (森茉莉・ロマンとエッセー), 1983-1983
- Mori Mari Complete Works (森茉莉全集), 1993-94

=== Illustrated books ===
- Yōsei Sophie: Ishikawa Yōji Photobook (妖精ソフィ 石川洋司写真集), 1981
- Watashi no Binanshi-ron (私の美男子論), 1995
