= Hakushū Kitahara =

Japanese tanka poet

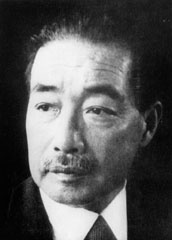
- Born: 25 January 1885; Yanagawa, Fukuoka, Japan
- Died: 2 November 1942 (aged 57); Kamakura, Japan
- Occupation: Poet
- Writing career
- Genre: poetry
- Notable works: Jashumon (Heretics, 1909)
- Literary movement: Pan no kai

Hakushū Kitahara (北原 白秋, Kitahara Hakushū; 25 January 1885 – 2 November 1942) is the pen-name of Kitahara Ryūkichi (北原 隆吉), a Japanese tanka poet active during the Taishō and Shōwa periods of Japan. He is regarded as one of the most popular and important poets in modern Japanese literature.

== Early life ==
Kitahara was born in Yanagawa, Fukuoka prefecture, to a family of sake brewers. He attended the English literature department of Waseda University, but he left the university soon after without graduating. As a student he became interested in the poetry of Tōson Shimazaki, especially his Wakanashu (Collection of Young Herbs, 1897), which was written in the Shintaishi, or New Style, format.

== Literary career ==
In 1904, Kitahara moved to Tokyo and began submitting his poetry to various literary magazines. In 1906, he joined the Shinshisha (New Poetry Association) at the invitation of Yosano Tekkan, and he published poems in its magazine Myōjō (Bright Star) that brought him instant fame as a rising young poet, and served as an introduction to a wide circle of writers and poets. From these contacts, Kitahara formed his own literary group, the Pan no kai (The Society of Pan), which was innovative in including painters, musicians and actors as well as writers.

In 1909, he became one of the founding members of the literary magazine, Subaru (The Pleiades), where he published his first collection of verses, Jashumon (Heretics), which took the poetic world by storm. Through the use of its rich imagery and innovative structure, it (along with Yosano Akiko's Midaregami), is credited by critics with having set a new baseline for modern Japanese poetry. Kitahara's initial success was followed by Omoide (Memories, 1912), in which he evokes memories of the world from a child's perspective.

In 1907 he published the essays 5 Pairs of Shoes, together with Yosano Tekkan, Mokutaro Kinoshita, Hirano Banri and Yoshii Isamu.

In 1912, Kitahara was arrested for adultery and jailed for two weeks. Though the charges were later dropped, the experience was traumatic, as it was mentioned briefly in his first tanka anthology, Kiri no hana (Paulownia Blossoms, 1913), as having led to a religious influence in his outlook on life. This became evident in his second anthology, Shinju Sho (Selection of Pearls, 1914), and his third, Hakkin no koma (Platinum Top, 1915), which include one-line poems in the form of Buddhist prayers. He strove for what he called “oriental simplicity”, a concept which he borrowed from his understanding of Zen in Suibokushu (Collection of Ink drawings, 1923) and Suzume no tamago (Sparrow's Eggs, 1921).

== Children's poems ==
In 1918, he joined the Akai tori (Red Bird) literary magazine at the request of founder Suzuki Miekichi, and was assigned to create children's songs, take charge of screening the poems submitted to the magazine, and collect nursery rhymes from around the country. The same year, he relocated from Tokyo to Odawara, Kanagawa. In 1919 he published Tonbo no medama (Dragonfly's Eyes), a collection of lyrics for children he had previously published serially in Akai Tori. In 1921 Maza gusu (Mother Goose), a collection of his translations of the English classic, came out, and that year, Usagi no denpo (Rabbit Telegrams), a collection of his nursery rhymes, was published. Starting with its April 1922 issue, Kodomo no kuni (Children's Land), it invited readers to submit children's songs, and Kitahara took charge of the screening and comments. In 1929 he published a collection of essays on children's songs, Midori no shokkaku (The Feel of Green).

== Later life ==
Always enjoying travel, Kitahara visited Misaki, Chiba, Nagano, Shiobara in 1923, Shizuoka in 1924, Hokkaidō and Karafuto in 1925.

Kitahara moved back to Tokyo in 1926, living at first in Yanaka, then moving to Setagaya in 1928. Kitahara continued to experiment with his style, and continued to be inspired by classical Japanese literature (such as the Kojiki), as seen in his Kaihyo no kumo (Sea and Clouds, 1929). This later work was inspired by a trip from Oita to Osaka by airplane, which was sponsored by the Asahi Shimbun as a publicity stunt. In 1930, Kitahara travelled to Manchuria, and rode on the South Manchurian Railroad. On his return to Japan, he visited Nara.

In 1935, Kitahara founded Tama, a tanka magazine, and became known as the spearhead of the fourth stage of the symbolist movement. Among his protégés were Kimata Osamu and Miya Shuji. He also accepted an invitation by the Osaka Mainichi Shimbun to tour Korea (then under Japanese rule), in exchange for poems on his impressions. Kitahara remained active even after almost going blind due to complications arising from diabetes in 1937. In 1940, he returned for a visit to Yanagawa after many years, and also visited Miyazaki and Nara. That same year he was made a member of the Japan Art Academy. In 1942, his health condition worsened, and he died of complications from his diabetes. His grave is located at the Tama Reien in the outskirts of Tokyo.

== Legacy ==
Kitahara published a total of over 200 books within his lifetime. In addition to his writings, he also edited the poetry magazine Chijo junrei (Earthly Pilgrimage), which enabled later authors, such as Hagiwara Sakutaro to get their start into the literary world. He also wrote anthems for high schools around the country, including Tōyō Eiwa Jogakuin. Many of his poems remain popular to this day. The Nihon Densho Doyo Shusei [Collection of Traditional Japanese Nursery Rhymes], a six-volume publication edited by Kitahara, finally came out in 1976.

An annual festival celebrating the life and works of Kitahara is still held in his hometown of Yanagawa during the month of November. Stages are set up along the canals of the city, and at night, by firelight, fans of Kitahara's works read poems and passages from them aloud. There are also canal parades and musical performances.

== See also ==
- Japanese literature
- List of Japanese authors
