= The Wild Geese (1953 film) =

1953 film by Shirō Toyoda

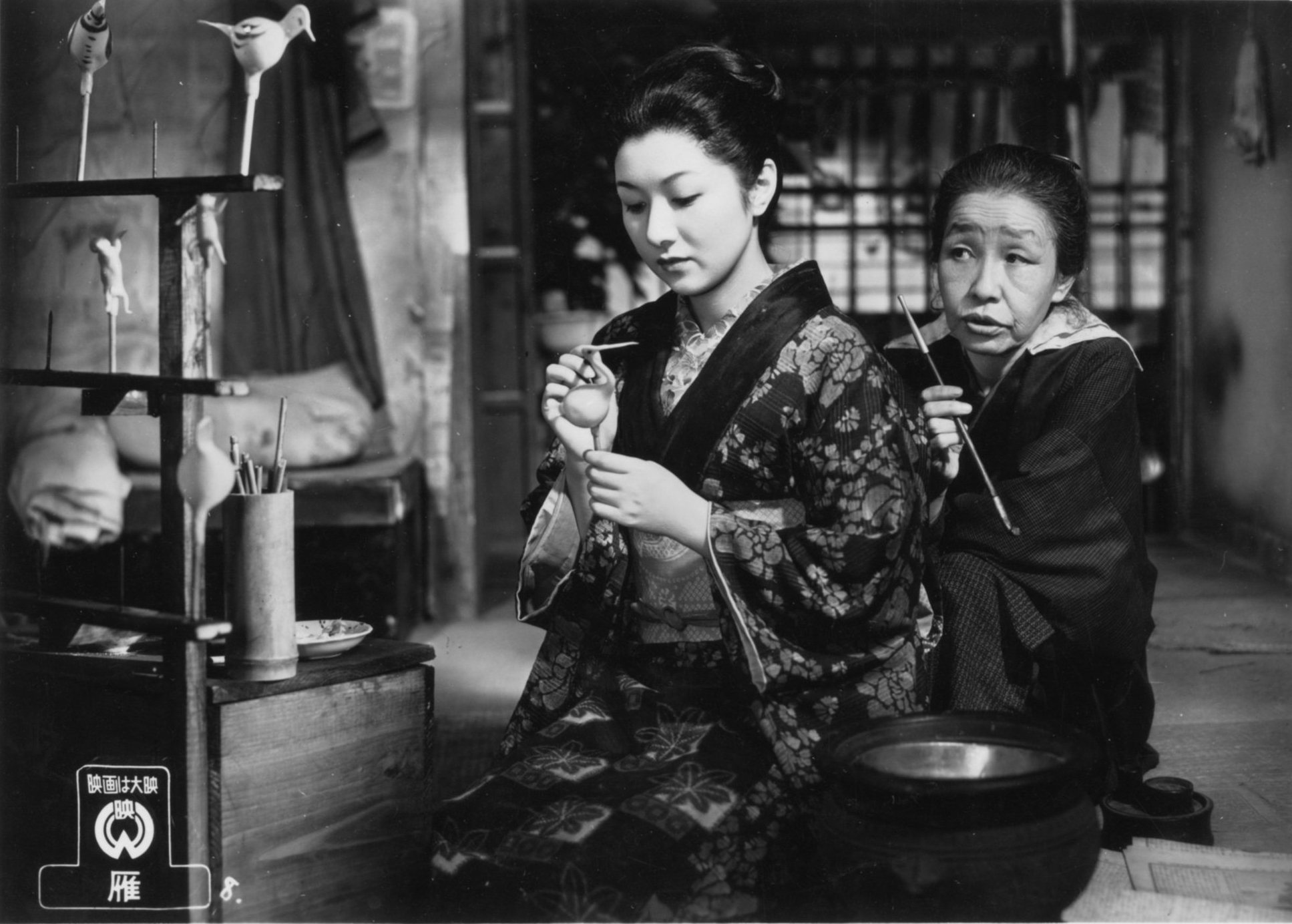
- Hideko Takamine and Chōko Iida
- Directed by: Shirō Toyoda
- Screenplay by: Masashige Narusawa
- Based on: The Wild Geese; 1911-13 novel by Mori Ōgai
- Produced by: Ikuji Hirao; Kenji Kuroiwa
- Starring: Hideko Takamine; Hiroshi Akutagawa; Jûkichi Uno
- Cinematography: Mitsuo Miura
- Edited by: Masanori Tsujii
- Music by: Dan Ikuma
- Production company: Daiei Film
- Distributed by: Daiei Film
- Release date: 15 September 1953 (Japan)
- Running time: 104 minutes
- Country: Japan
- Language: Japanese

The Wild Geese (Japanese: 雁, Hepburn: Gan) is a 1953 Japanese drama film directed by Shirō Toyoda. The film is based on Mori Ōgai's novel of the same name. Hideko Takamine stars as Otama, a young woman who becomes the mistress of a married man in order to support her aging father.

== Plot ==
Otama is a young woman who has previously been married, though the man turned out to already have been married with a wife and child. Because of this Otama is considered a disgrace and finding a good match near impossible.

Feeling pressure to support her father who is frail, aging, and works to support them both by selling candy, Otama agrees to have dinner with a widowed kimono merchant who has offered to keep Otama as his mistress. Unbeknown to her, Suezō, the man she has agreed to meet, is in fact a still married moneylender and the arrangement between them has been set up to settle some debts of the matchmaker.

At a restaurant before she meets Suezō, Otama sees a handsome young student, Okada, who also notices her. Nevertheless the deal between Suezō and Otama goes forward and he installs her in a new home.

Otama tries to be a good mistress, but she has little feeling for Suezō. Through her maid she quickly comes to learn that her master is a moneylender and that the women of the neighbourhood have little respect for her. Suezō also inadvertently reveals that he still has a wife, and the two women later meet and recognize each other in the street based on items of clothing Suezō has given each of them. Nevertheless Otama feels obligated to stay, knowing that there is no other way for her to support herself or her father.

One day a snake attacks Otama's pet bird. Her maid calls for help, and Okada kills the snake and saves the bird. Otama follows Okada on his errands afterwards and sees him go to Suezō to obtain money before selling one of his textbooks, which she immediately buys back.

Suezō discovers the book and becomes suspicious. He says he will be staying in another town overnight.

Otama prepares a meal for Okada, intending to invite him in from his daily walk, but she finds that he is accompanied by a friend and she does not speak. Suezō returns unexpectedly, discovers the meal and tells her Okada is going away to Europe. She returns the book to the friend, who confirms the news.

Otama becomes resigned to her situation, and the film closes with her watching wild geese flying over water.

== Cast ==
- Hideko Takamine as Otama
- Eizō Tanaka as Zenkichi
- Miki Odagiri as Oume
- Machiko Hamaji
- Eijirō Tono as Suezō
- Kumeko Urabe
- Hiroshi Akutagawa as Okada
- Jukichi Uno as Kimura
- Kuniko Miyake Osada, the sewing mistress
- Chōko Iida
