= Vita Sexualis =

1909 novel by Mori Ōgai

Vita Sexualis (ヰタ・セクスアリス, Wita Sekusuarisu) is an erotic novel published in 1909 by Mori Ōgai in the 7th issue of the literary journal Subaru. The protagonist of the novel, Shizuka Kanei, is understood to be a semi-fictionalized autobiographical representation of Mori Ōgai.

== Censorship ==
Three weeks after its publication, Vita Sexualis was promptly banned from circulation by the Japanese Government due to its content. The story was deemed to be "dangerous to public morals", making the issue of Subaru where it appeared completely out of print.
