= Shibue Chūsai =

Japanese physician (1805–1858)

Shibue Chūsai (渋江 抽斎; December 28, 1805 – October 5, 1858) was a Japanese medical doctor of the late Edo period, who served the Tsugaru clan of Hirosaki. He was the subject of a biography by Mori Ōgai, based on the Shibue family papers and serialised in 1916.
