= Miekichi Suzuki =

Japanese writer (1882–1936)

- 鈴木 三重吉
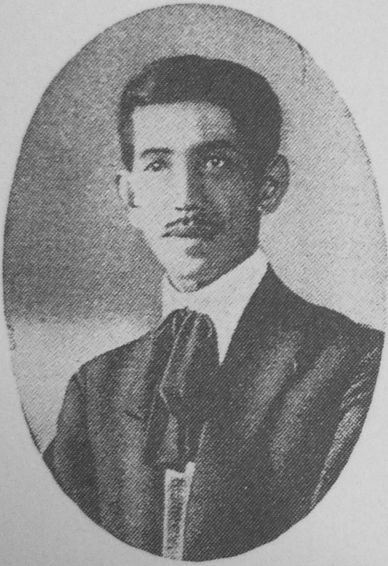
- Born: September 29, 1882; Hiroshima, Japan
- Died: June 27, 1936 (aged 53)
- Occupation: Writer
- Writing career
- Genre: Children's literature

Miekichi Suzuki (鈴木 三重吉, Suzuki Miekichi; September 29, 1882 – June 27, 1936) was a Japanese novelist and author of children's stories from Hiroshima.

== Biography ==
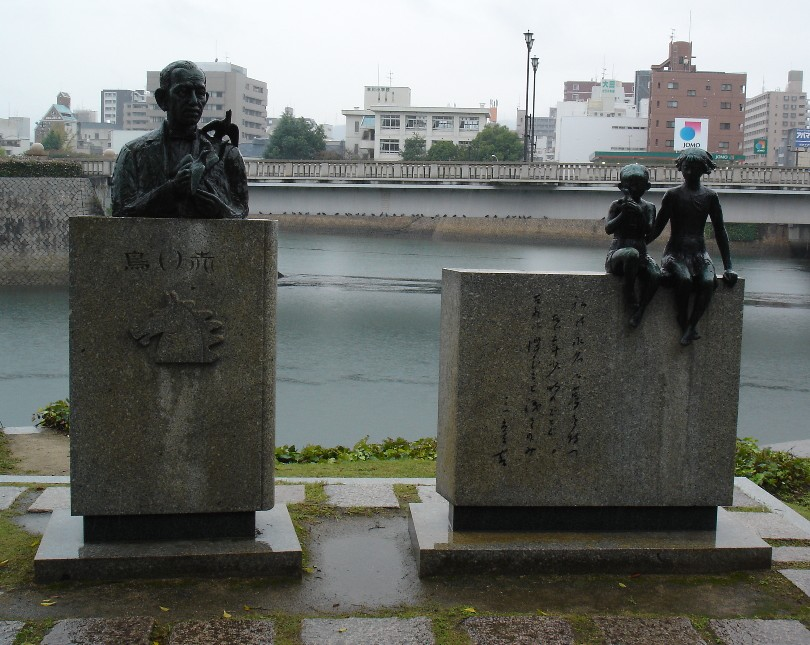
Memorial of Miekichi Suzuki in Hiroshima

Suzuki was born in Hiroshima. He studied English literature at Tokyo Imperial University (now the University of Tokyo), and later launched a children's literature magazine called 赤い鳥 (Akai tori / Red Bird) in 1918. Unusually for its time, the journal emphasized learning from observation and experience rather than rote learning, and focused on everyday language as much as ceremonial language. 196 issues were published.

== Major works ==
Suzuki's major works include:

- Kojiki Monogatari (古事記物語, The tale of Kojiki)
- Daishin Kasai Ki (大震火災記, A record of the great earthquake and fire)
- Bukubuku naganaga hinome kozou (ぶくぶく長々火の目小僧, Expanding, growing fire-eyed boy)

== See also ==
- Japanese literature
- List of Japanese authors
