= Koganei Yoshikiyo =

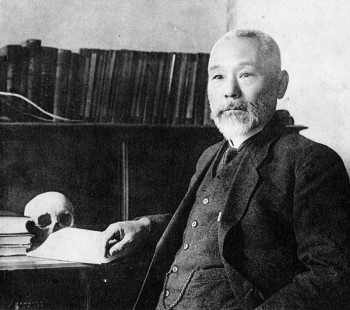
- Born: January 17, 1859; Niigata prefecture, Japan
- Died: January 17, 1944 (aged 84)
- Other name: 小金井 良精
- Occupations: anatomist, anthropologist
- Relatives: Shinichi Hoshi (grandson); Mori Ōgai (brother-in-law)

Koganei Yoshikiyo (小金井 良精; January 17, 1859 – October 16, 1944) was a Japanese anatomist and anthropologist of the Meiji period.

== Biography ==
A child of an Echigo Nagaoka clansman, he graduated from East School, the precursor of the Tokyo Imperial University medical school, in 1880. He then went to Germany where he learned anatomy and histology. He returned to Japan in 1885, and in the following year he was appointed a professor at Tokyo Imperial University Medical School, becoming the first Japanese lecturer on anatomy in the school.

After studying Ainu skeletons in 1888, he began working in anthropology. Citing the results of his Ainu research, he argued that prehistoric man was included among Ainu.

From 1893 to 1896, he served as the Imperial University medical college president, and in 1893 he established Japanese Association of Anatomists. In 1921, he retired from academia but continued his research.

His wife was Koganei Kimiko, an essayist, poet and younger sister of writer Mori Ōgai. A statue of Koganei Yoshikiyo is owned by the University of Tokyo. Hoshi Hajime, the founder of pharmaceutical company Hoshi Seiyaku, was his son-in-law, and Hoshi Shin'ichi, the science fiction novelist, was his grandchild.
