= The Wild Geese (Mori novel) =

Novel by Mori Ōgai

- 1959 English edition cover
- Author: Mori Ōgai
- Original title: 'Gan'
- Translator: Ochiai Kingo and Sanford Goldstein
- Language: Japanese
- Genre: Historical novel
- Publisher: Tuttle Publishing (English ed.)
- Publication date: 1911 to 1913 (December 1959 in English)
- Publication place: Japan
- Media type: Print (Paperback)
- Pages: 128 pages English paperback
- ISBN: 0-8048-1070-2
- OCLC: 328121

Mori Ōgai's classical novel, The Wild Geese or The Wild Goose (1911–1913, 雁 Gan), was first published in serial form in Japan, and tells the story of unfulfilled love set against a background of social change and Westernization. The story is set in 1880 Tokyo. The novel contains commentary on the changing situation between the Edo and Meiji periods. The characters of the novel are diverse, including not only students preparing for a privileged intellectual life and commoners who provide services to them, but also a pair of highly developed female characters. Mori sympathetically portrays the dilemmas and frustrations faced by women in this early period of Japan's modernization.

The novel was made into a movie of the same name by Shirō Toyoda in 1953, starring Hideko Takamine as Otama.

== Synopsis ==
Suezo, a moneylender, is tired of life with his nagging wife, so he decides to take a mistress. Otama, the only child of a widower merchant, wishing to provide for her aging father, is forced by poverty to become the moneylender's mistress. When Otama learns the truth about Suezo, she feels betrayed, and hopes to find a hero to rescue her. Otama meets Okada, a medical student, who becomes both the object of her desire and the symbol of her rescue. However, on the night when she plans to meet him, Okada is distracted by the machinations of another student, and soon departs for Germany.

== Release details ==
- The Wild Geese, trans. Ochiai Kingo and Sanford Goldstein. Boston: Tuttle Publishing, 1959, 128 pages, ISBN 0-8048-1070-2
- The Wild Goose, trans. Kingo Ochiai and Sanford Goldstein, Charles E. Tuttle Company, Inc, 1991, 119 pages, ISBN 0-8048-1070-2
- The Wild Goose, trans. Burton Watson. 1995. Ann Arbor: University of Michigan Center for Japanese Studies, 1998, ISBN 0-939512-70-X
- The Wild Goose, trans. Meredith McKinney. Finlay Lloyd Publications, 2014, ISBN 9780987592927
