= Myōjō =

Literary magazine

Myōjō 明星
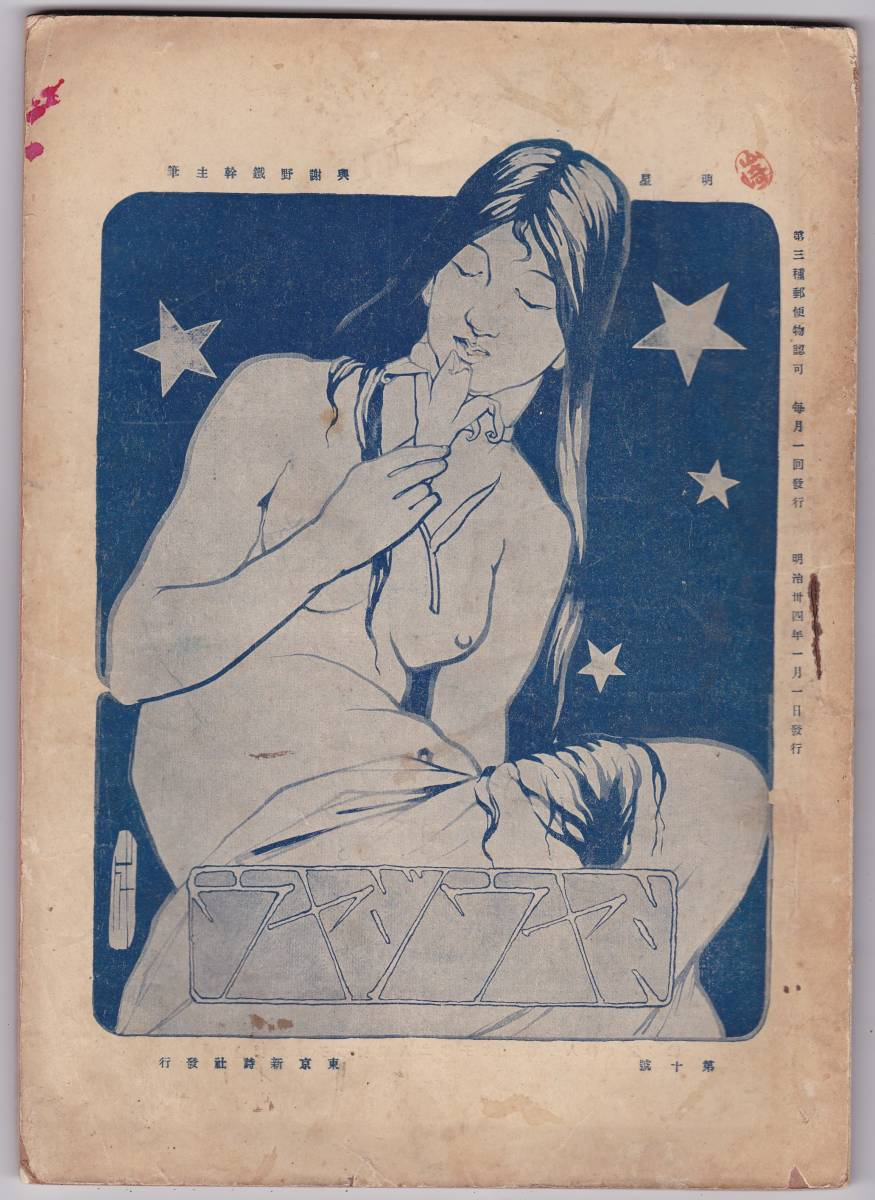
- Myōjō 10th issue
- Categories: Literary magazine
- Frequency: Monthly
- First issue: April 1900
- Final issue: November 1908
- Company: Shinshisha (新詩社)
- Country: Japan
- Language: Japanese

Myōjō (明星, Myōjō) was a monthly literary magazine published in Japan between April 1900 and November 1908. The name Myōjō can be translated as either Bright Star or Morning Star.

== History and profile ==
The magazine was established in 1900. It was the organ of a poetry circle called Shinshisha (New Poetry Society) which had been founded by Yosano Tekkan in 1899. Myōjō was initially known for its development and promotion of a modernized version of the 31-syllable tanka poetry. Famous contributors such as Yosano Akiko, who also edited the magazine, transformed the traditional poetry with a sensual style in the romantic movement.

Other important contributors included Hagiwara Sakutaro, Ishikawa Takuboku, Iwano Homei, Kitahara Hakushu, Noguchi Yonejiro, Kinoshita Rigen, and Haruo Satō. The magazine was advised by Mori Ōgai, Ueda Bin and Baba Kocho, with Yosano Tekkan remaining as editor-in-chief of the publication.

Myōjō gradually transformed itself from purely tanka poetry, to a sophisticated journal promoting the visual arts and western style poetry as well. It is regarded as having a crucial influence on the development of Japanese poetry and literature in the early 20th century.

Myōjō was short lived, as internal dissension dissolved the Shinshisha literary circle. Many of its original members helped create a successor literary journal, Subaru (The Pleiades). Myōjō was revived from 1921–1927 by Tekkan, and again from 1947–1949.
