= Isamu Yoshii =

Japanese poet and playwright (1886–1960)

Count Isamu Yoshii
- 吉井 勇
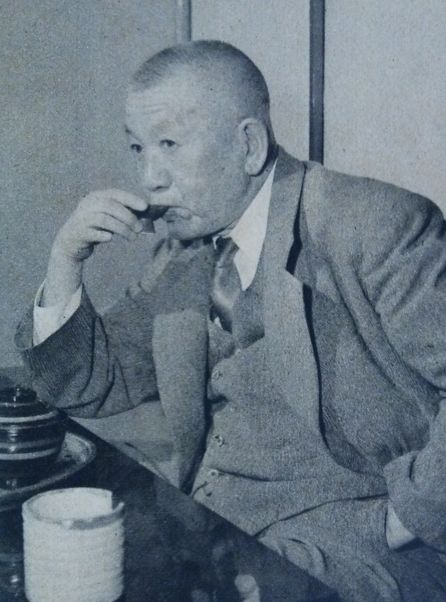
- Yoshii in January 1955
- Born: October 8, 1886; Tokyo, Japan
- Died: November 9, 1960 (aged 74); Tokyo, Japan
- Resting place: Aoyama Cemetery, Tokyo, Japan
- Education: Waseda University
- Occupations: Writer, playwright and poet
- Writing career
- Language: Japanese
- Genres: Tanka poetry, stage plays
- Notable work: Gondola no Uta (1915)
- Movement: Pan no Kai

Count Isamu Yoshii (吉井 勇, Yoshii Isamu; October 8, 1886 − November 9, 1960) was a Japanese tanka poet and playwright active in Taishō and Shōwa period Japan. Attracted to European romanticism in his youth, his later works were more subdued.

== Early life ==
Yoshii Isamu was born in the elite Takanawa district Tokyo. His grandfather, Count Yoshii Tomosane was a former samurai retainer of Satsuma Domain, and member of the House of Peers, the Privy Council and official in the Imperial Household Ministry. His aunt was the wife of Field Marshal Oyama Iwao. Yoshii began to live at his father's cottage in the Zaimokuza neighborhood of Kamakura, Kanagawa prefecture from 1887 and entered the elementary section of the Kamakura Normal School in 1891. The following year the family returned to Tokyo, but for the rest of his life, he returned to Kamakura frequently to recuperate from bouts of ill health (i.e. tuberculosis).

He started to write short verses while attending school at Tokyo Metropolitan No.1 Junior High School and Kogyokusha Junior High School.

Yoshii enrolled briefly in the School of Political Science and Economics at Waseda University in 1908, but dropped out the same year to join Yosano Tekkan's Tokyo Shin-shi Sha (Tokyo New Poetry Society), and began contributing his tanka verses to the society's literary magazine, Myōjō (Bright Star). As a member of the Myōjō inner circle, he met and was influenced by Mori Ōgai, Ueda Bin, and Kitahara Hakushū.

== Literary career ==
Yoshii left Myōjō to form a new group, Pan no Kai, together with Kitahara Hakushu due to their shared attraction of romanticism and aestheticism. In 1909, with the patronage of Mori Ōgai, Yoshii brought out a new literary magazine, Subaru.

In 1910, Yoshii published his first tanka anthology, Sakehogai, (Revelry) describing the joys and sorrows of a young poet given to wine and women. This established his name firmly in poetry circles and was followed by other tanka anthologies such as Sakujitsu made (Until Yesterday), Gion kashu (Gion Verses, 1915), and Tokyo kōtō shū (Collection from the Tokyo Red-Light District, 1916).

Yoshii was also interested in the Shingeki (New Theater) movement. His first stage play (actually a collection of eleven one-act plays), called Gogo Sanji (3 PM), was published in Subaru in 1911, marking his debut as a playwright. This was followed by pieces such as Yumesuke to So to (Yumesuke and the Monk), and Kyo Geinin (Comic Artist).

While drifting around Shikoku, Kyūshū, and Kyoto, he joined the Radio Drama Kenkyukai with Kubota Mantarō at the request of Tokyo Broadcasting Corporation (later NHK), which started broadcasting radio programs in 1925. In the same year, he released scripts for radio dramas, such as Saigo no Seppun (The Last Kiss), Gekijo Iriguchi no Hanjikan (Half an Hour at the Theater Door), and Kamome no Shigai (Dead Seagull). In 1927, his play Ame no Yobanashi (Night Stories in the Rain) about a melancholic traveling performer wandering around the country was broadcast as a radio drama. The story proved very popular and gained Yoshii a wide following in the early days of radio.

In 1933, Yoshii was forced to divorce his wife, Nobuko, who was the center of the “Florida Dance Hall Scandal”, a major scandal involving adultery by members of the nobility with commoners.

In his later years, Yoshii lived in a house at the base of Mount Hiei in Kyoto, and was a frequent visitor to the Gion entertainment district. Every year on November 8, a festival is held in his memory, where the geiko and maiko of the Gion district lay flowers before a monument with his Tanka:

No matter what they say,
I love Gion.
Even in my sleep
The sound of water
Flows beneath my pillow
（かにかくに 祇園はこひし寝（ぬ）るときも 枕のしたを水のながるる）
Ka ni kaku ni / Gion ha koishi / nuru toki mo / makura no shita wo / mizu no nagaruru

In 1948, Yoshii was appointed to be a poetry selector for the Imperial Household's New Year poetry reading ceremony. He became a member of the Japan Art Academy the same year. Yoshii died in 1960 at the age of 74. His grave is at the Aoyama Cemetery in Tokyo.

== See also ==
- Japanese literature
- List of Japanese authors
