= Mori Ōgai =

Japanese writer (1862–1922)

Senior Second Rank Mori Ōgai
- 森 鷗外
- Born: February 17, 1862; Tsuwano, Shimane, Japan
- Died: July 8, 1922 (aged 60); Tokyo, Japan
- Relatives: Mari Mori (daughter)
- Military career
- Allegiance: Empire of Japan
- Branch: Imperial Japanese Army
- Service years: 1882–1916
- Rank: Surgeon General of the Imperial Japanese Army (Lieutenant General)
- Conflicts: First Sino-Japanese War; Russo-Japanese War; World War I
- Awards: Grand Cordon of the Order of the Rising Sun; Grand Cordon of the Order of the Sacred Treasure; Order of the Golden Kite, 3rd Class
- Other work: Translator, novelist, and poet

Lieutenant-General Mori Rintarō (森 林太郎; February 17, 1862 – July 8, 1922), known by his pen name Mori Ōgai (森 鷗外; Japanese pronunciation: [mo.ɾʲi (|) oꜜː.ɡai, -ŋai]), was a Japanese Army Surgeon general officer, translator, novelist, poet and father of famed author Mari Mori. He obtained his medical license at a very young age and introduced translated German language literary works to the Japanese public. Mori Ōgai also was considered the first to successfully express the art of western poetry in Japanese. He wrote many works and created many writing styles. The Wild Geese (1911–1913) is considered his major work. After his death, he was considered one of the leading writers who modernized Japanese literature.

His continued obstinacy to recognize beriberi as a thiamine deficiency led to the death of more than 27,000 Japanese soldiers.

== Biography ==
=== Early life ===
Mori was born as Mori Rintarō (森 林太郎) in Tsuwano, Iwami Province (present-day Shimane Prefecture). His family were hereditary physicians to the daimyō of the Tsuwano Domain. As the eldest son, it was assumed that he would carry on the family tradition; therefore he was sent to attend classes in the Confucian classics at the domain academy, and took private lessons in rangaku ("Dutch learning", and by extension "Western learning") and Dutch.

In 1872, after the Meiji Restoration and the abolition of the domains, the Mori family relocated to Tokyo. Mori stayed at the residence of Nishi Amane, in order to receive tutoring in German, which was the primary language for medical education at the time. In 1874, he was admitted to the government medical school (the predecessor for Tokyo Imperial University's Medical School), and graduated in 1881 at the age of 19, the youngest person ever to be awarded a medical license in Japan. It was also during this time that he developed an interest in literature, reading extensively from the late-Edo period popular novels, and taking lessons in Chinese poetry and literature.

=== Early career ===
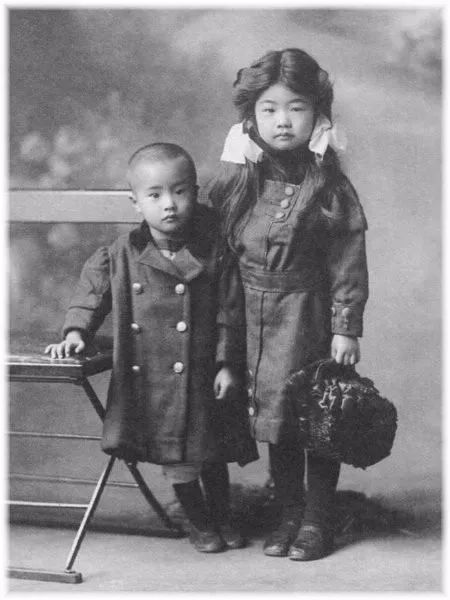
The author's oldest and youngest children (Mari and Rui)

After graduation, Mori enlisted in the Imperial Japanese Army as a medical officer, hoping to specialize in military medicine and hygiene. He was commissioned as a deputy surgeon (lieutenant) in 1882. Mori was sent by the Army to study in Germany (Leipzig, Dresden, Munich, and Berlin) from 1884 to 1888. During this time, he also developed an interest in European literature. As a matter of trivia, Mori Ōgai is the first Japanese known to have ridden on the Orient Express. One of his major accomplishments was his ability to create works using a style of "translation" that he obtained from his experience in European culture.

In his stay in Germany, Ogai sometimes encountered situations where he expressed his patriotism. There was this one time that he started a public controversy against a German geologist, Dr Edmund Naumann. Dr. Naumann gave a presentation entitled "Japan" at a lecture in which he criticized Japan. In short, his criticism was that the opening of Japan to international relations was not a voluntary act, but was the result of foreign pressure. After the lecture, Naumann was said to have made a number of jokes critical of Japan in conversation with other scholars. Ogai wrote in his "Doitsu Nikki" that he made a speech to refute Naumann's comments shortly. Since it was a social occasion, the controversy seemed to have been settled, but the debate was continued when Dr. Naumann published a column in the newspaper "Allgemeine Zeitung". According to "Wakaki hi no Mori Ogai" by Keiichiro Kobori, the controversy was focused on eight points including the origin of the Japanese people and the treatment of the Ainu people, food and clothing, public health, manners and customs, the influence of oil painting techniques on Japanese painting, Buddhism and myth, the effectiveness of the modernization movement, and the future of Japan. Of these, "the pros and cons of the modernization movement in Japan" and "the future of Japan" were the major points. Naumann pointed out that Japan opened its door to the international relations from the external forces and had easily and superficially accepted Western civilization. Furthermore, that the Japanese themselves tend to disregard the traditional culture under the justification of the modernization was his argument. Ogai made a counterargument that the introduction of Western civilization was natural, rational, and spontaneous, and important point is to identify what to westernize and what to preserve as traditional Japanese culture. Ogai carried out this controversy all in German.

After four years in Germany, Ogai felt that the realization of the mental revolution of the Japanese was his mission to be accomplished. Pushed by this idea, Ogai at first started to spend time on enlightening the public and other intellectuals by introducing the aesthetic scientific method which he obtained in the West. This took various forms such as journal articles and debates in the newspaper section. His attitude around this time period is often regarded as "belligerent and combative". This attitude emerged out of his passion to establish the basis for criticism and the principle of induction method. Given the background of the time where a lot of policies and ideas were based on the idealistic theory, Ogai's enthusiasm could be fully explained. One of the representative examples which reflected the radical westernization took place in the western style building called "Rokumeikan", located in Chiyoda-ku in Tokyo. Rokumei-kan was established in 1888 by the then minister of foreign affair, Inoue Kaoru for the diplomatic purpose. His policy faced strong criticism by the right-wing nationalists and Ogai was one of those critics to the westernization without solid foundation. Ogai had dealt with various fields including urban planning, dietetics, and also lifestyle itself. His activity was supported by other nationalists and conservatives and he came to play an important role as a public educator.

Upon his return to Japan, he was promoted to surgeon first class (captain) in May 1885; after graduating from the Army War College in 1888, he was promoted to senior surgeon, second class (lieutenant colonel) in October 1889. Now a high-ranking army doctor, he pushed for a more scientific approach to medical research, even publishing a medical journal out of his own funds. His view on the modernization of Japan was distinctive from other intellectuals in the point where he was very critical to the absence of the rationale basis in the scientific field, especially medicine. That the intellectuals kept importing only the fruit of the science, not the scientific method itself was the source of concern for Ōgai because he believed that the understanding of the essence of the Western value, for specifically, the manner and the procedures of the scientific method, was vital so that in the future Japan can produce the original works of science, not the borrowings of it. This view represented his aspiration, the realization of the mental revolution of Japanese, which he had been considering after the abroad experience. As a person who studied in West, he felt the responsibility to foster the process of the modernization as if it was his mission. Another concern regarding the process of the modernization was the potential that the reckless importation of Western culture could bring the destruction to the Japanese traditions, which Ōgai found in a sense unique and original to the West. In this sense, Ōgai was a conservative who knew the value of Japanese culture in contrast to other Japanese who were in favor of radical Westernization. This attitude was reflected in his journal articles. For example, one of his works, Nihon Kaoku ron (essay on urban planning), he argued that the urban development shall not be driven by the idealistic theories in which the primary objective was to imitate the Western style, but to be processed based on the scientific evidence. As a result of his contribution, he was considered as a public educator at that time. This was, however, a source of trouble in later stage because his belligerent style was unwelcomed by his superiors. One of the reasons of his transfer to Kokura was of this conflict between a conservative administrative body and a progressive scientist. Meanwhile, he also attempted to revitalize modern Japanese literature and published his own literary journal (Shigarami sōshi, 1889–1894) and his own book of poetry (Omokage, 1889). In his writings, he was an "anti-realist", asserting that literature should reflect the emotional and spiritual domain. The short story "The Dancing Girl" (舞姫, Maihime, 1890) described an affair between a Japanese man and a German woman.

He married two times. His first wife was Toshiko Akamatsu, a daughter of Admiral Noriyoshi Akamatsu and a close friend of Nishi Amane. The couple married in 1889 and had a son who was born in 1890, Oto (from German Otto), before divorcing later that same year. The divorce was under acrimonious circumstances that irreparably ended his friendship with Nishi. His second wife, whom he married in 1902, was Shigeko Arakawa. They had four children: Mari (Marie, 1903–1987), Furitsu (Fritz, 1907–1908), who died in childhood, Annu (Anne, 1909–1998), and Rui (Louis, 1911–1991). Both daughters, Mari and Annu, as well his son Rui, became writers.

In May 1893, Mori was promoted to senior surgeon, first class (colonel).

=== Later career ===
At the start of the First Sino-Japanese War of 1894–1895, Mori was sent to Manchuria and, the following year, to Taiwan. In February 1899, he was appointed head of the Army Medical Corps with the rank of surgeon major-general and was based in Kokura, Kyūshū. His transfer was because of his responses to fellow doctors and his criticism about their fields of research in the Japanese Medical Journal of which he was editor. In 1902, he was reassigned to Tokyo. He was attached to a division in the Russo-Japanese War, based out of Hiroshima. Although Ogai was a fine artist, it is impossible to understand his thoughts on the war since he did not leave any personal document about it. This is because of his position in the army.

In 1907, Mori was promoted to Surgeon General of the Army (lieutenant general), the highest post within the Japanese Army Medical Corps, and became head of the Imperial Fine Arts Academy, which is now the Japan Art Academy. Under his leadership, an estimated 27,000 soldiers in the army died of beriberi during the Russo-Japanese War; in contrast, almost no sailors died. In 1908, the Diet of Japan appointed Mori as the head of the Beriberi Research Council to investigate the causes of the disease. In this position, he led a faction of doctors from Tokyo Imperial University who asserted that beriberi was an endemic disease caused by an unknown pathogen, ultimately ensuring that the Japanese army lagged significantly behind research worldwide and even within the nation.

In 1884, naval surgeon Takaki Kanehiro concluded his experiments showing that the disease was a thiamine deficiency caused by sailors' diet of polished white rice; this advice had been adopted by the Japanese Navy by the time of Russo-Japanese War. In 1919, the council conducted its first experiments on vitamins; this was 35 years after Takaki's experimentation in the Navy and six years after Edward Bright Vedder convinced the Western scientific community that rice bran could treat beriberi. By 1926, the Nobel Prize had been awarded to Christiaan Eijkman and Sir Frederick Hopkins for research on thiamine deficiency they had conducted in the late 19th century.

He was appointed director of the Imperial Museum when he retired in 1916. Mori Ōgai then died of renal failure and pulmonary tuberculosis six years later, aged 60.

==== Literary work ====
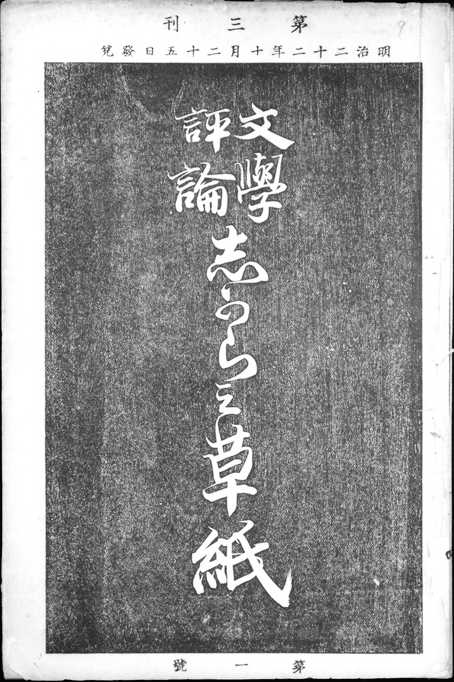
The cover of the first issue of Shigarami sōshi in October 1889

Mori's first notable work is "The Dancing Girl" (舞姫, Maihime, 1890) a story chronicling the love affair between Ōta Toyotarō, a Japanese law student studying abroad in Berlin, and a German dancer, Elis. Toyotarō, recalling his experiences aboard a boat in Saigon, writes that he came to Germany on a government scholarship, having been a model student in Japan. However, after he meets Elis, Toyotarō becomes subject to rumors from his Japanese colleagues, and is eventually dismissed from his government post. Toyotarō continues an impoverished life with Elis until the arrival of his old friend Aizawa Kenkichi, who is working for the government official Count Amakata. Soon after agreeing to travel to Russia with Aizawa and the Count, he learns of Elis' pregnancy. Upon Toyotarō's return, he decides to return to Japan with Count Amakata, abandoning Elis and their baby. Elis learns of Toyotarō's plans through Aizawa, and goes mad. Toyotarō ends his story by expressing resentment toward Aizawa despite his help.

The Dancing Girl, according to literary scholar Tomiko Yoda, is generally regarded as one of the first works of Japanese literature to incorporate first-person narration in relation to modern modes of subjectivity. Both Japanese and English-language critics have extensively written on the story, beginning with a critique written by Ishibashi Ningetsu a month after the story's publication. Twentieth-century Japanese critiques generally focused on the development of narration of the self in the story, with Maeda Ai analyzing Toyotarō's narration in relation to his movement through Berlin's urban space. Komori Yōichi writes that Toyotarō, writing in Saigon, develops unique "divided selves" that mediate each other through the act of narration. English-language scholars like Christopher Hill have focused on the themes of nationalism in the story, with Toyotarō torn between returning to Japan and continuing the development of a modern nation-state, or staying in the cosmopolitan city of Berlin with his lover Elis. The story continues to be regarded as a classic work of modern Japanese literature.

Although Mori did little writing from 1892 to 1902, he continued to edit a literary journal (Mezamashi gusa, 1892–1909). He also produced translations of the works of Goethe, Schiller, Ibsen, Hans Christian Andersen, and Hauptmann. It was during the Russo-Japanese War (1904–05) that Mori started keeping a poetic diary. After the war, he began holding tanka writing parties that included several noted poets such as Yosano Akiko. Mori Ōgai helped found a new magazine called Subaru in 1909 with the help of others such as Yosano Akiko and Yosano Tekkan. His later works can be divided into three separate periods. From 1909 to 1912, he wrote mostly fiction based on his own experiences. This period includes Vita Sexualis and his most popular novel, Gan (雁, The Wild Geese; 1911–1913), which is set in 1881 Tokyo and was filmed by Shirō Toyoda in 1953 as The Mistress.

In 1909, he released his novel Vita Sexualis, which was abruptly banned a month later. Authorities deemed his work too sexual and dangerous to public morals. Mori Ōgai, during the period he was writing Vita Sexualis, focused on making a statement regarding the current literary trends of modern Japanese literature. He approached the trend on sexuality and individualism by describing them as a link between body and soul. Ōgai points out problems concerning the art and literature world in the 19th century in his work. His writing style, depicted from the Meiji government's perspective, derived from naturalism and was implemented with his thoughts that were brought up from writers who focused on the truth. Ogai expressed his concern towards the intellectual freedom after High Treason Incident in 1910 where socialists and anarchists were unfairly executed by the court on suspicion of the assassination of the Japanese Emperor Meiji. Although he was on the side of the government as an elite army doctor, Ogai showed strong concern about the government's suppression of thought and academics, and started to call for freedom of speech. His arguments were embedded in some of his works such as "Chinmoku no to" and "Shokudo".

His later works link his concerns with the Ministry of Education regarding the understanding of "intellectual freedom" and how they police and dictate the potential of literature. During the time from 1912 to 1916 saw a shift in his writing work from fictions to historical stories, influenced by the shocking news of Nogi Maresukea's death, a general of the Imperial Japanese Army. In this event, Ōgai saw a revival of pre-modern ritual in the world where the individualism was gradually stemming. While the public opinion quickly labeled Nogi's death as anachronistic, Ōgai, who was closer to Nogi, started the investigation of the spiritual background of his age by narrating the biographies of the past events. The works such as 'Abe Ichizoku' and 'Shibue Chusai' were the byproducts of his approach to the Japanese history. In these historical biographies, Ōgai depicted the men who committed ritual death, Junshi with a realistic prose. Through these works, Ōgai realized that those people who had to die were, to a certain extent, victims of the long-held practice and social expectation. Why Ōgai was inclined to investigate the history, or in other word, the identity of Japan, was partially because of his personal matter in which he was struggling to take a balance between West and East. Another reason was that he wanted to look back at the Meiji era at the very last time. After "Yasui Fujin" in 1914, his style changed from "history as it is," in which he depicted history as it had been narrated, to "story based on history," in which he somehow added his own arrangements to historical events. Followed by this change, "Shibue Chusai", one of his best known works, was come off. From 1916 to 1921, he turned his attention to biographies of three Edo period doctors.

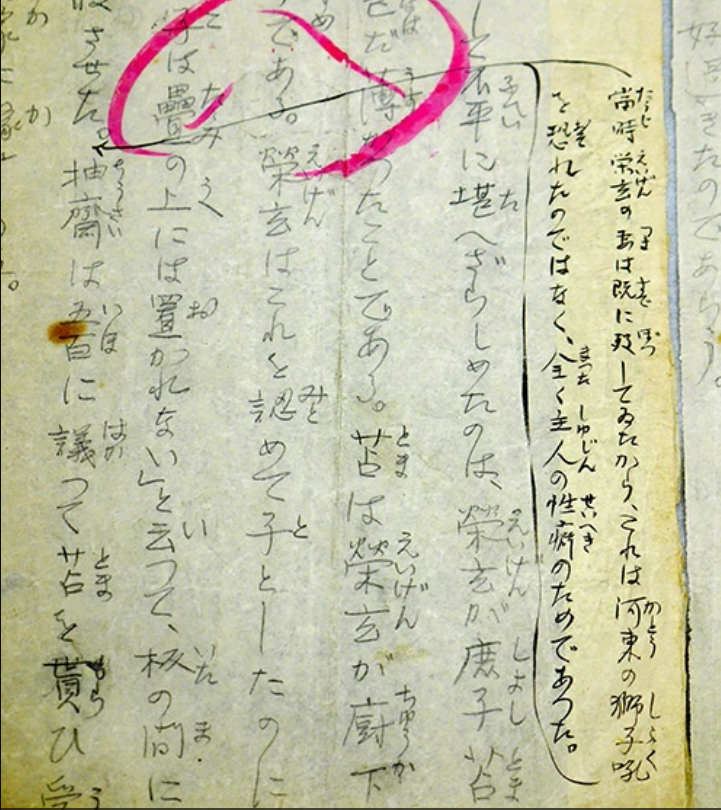
Autographic manuscript for the 50th installment of "Shibue Chusai", 1916

Sansho Dayu was an early Japanese work written in the mid 1600s, and Ogai's rewrite of it essentially changed some minor details and the ending, wherein which the bailiff's punishment is not given as much attention as in the original, and it is not so much violent as it is politically appropriate. There are also numerous supernatural elements removed from the original story, making it palatable to a wider audience. Ogai's retelling of Sansho Dayu was made into a film, directed by Kenji Mizoguchi (1954).

== Legacy ==
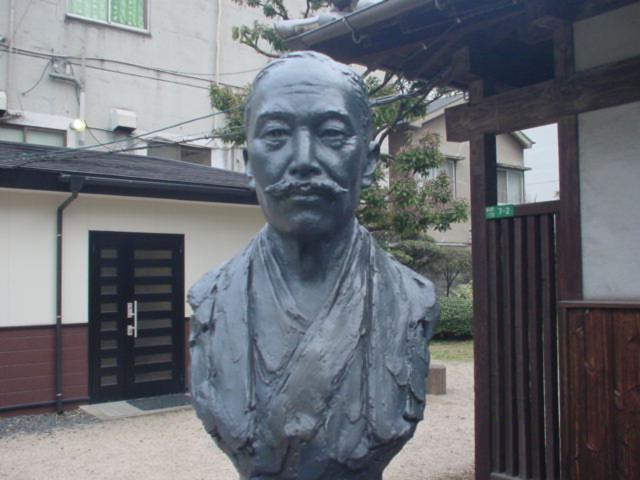
Mori Ōgai's statue at his house in Kokurakita Ward, Kitakyūshū

As an author, Mori is considered one of the leading writers of the Meiji period. In his literary journals, he instituted modern literary criticism in Japan, based on the aesthetic theories of Karl von Hartmann. A house which Mori lived in is preserved in Kokurakita Ward in Kitakyūshū, not far from Kokura Station. Here he wrote Kokura Nikki ("Kokura Diary"). His birthhouse is also preserved in Tsuwano. The two one-story houses are remarkably similar in size and in their traditional Japanese style.

Because of his biographical works, most notably Shibui Chusai (1916), Ogai is credited to be the pioneer of modern biographical literature in Japanese culture.

His daughter Mari, who was nineteen years old at the time of his death, wrote extensively about her relationship with her father. Starting with her 1961 novella, A Lovers' Forest (恋人たちの森, Koibito Tachi no Mori), she wrote tragic stories about love affairs between older men and boys in their late teens which influenced the creation of the Yaoi genre, stories about male-male relationships, written by women for women, that began to appear in the nineteen seventies in Japanese novels and comics. Mori's sister, Kimiko, married Koganei Yoshikiyo. Hoshi Shinichi was one of their grandsons.

== Mori Ōgai former residence in Tsuwano ==
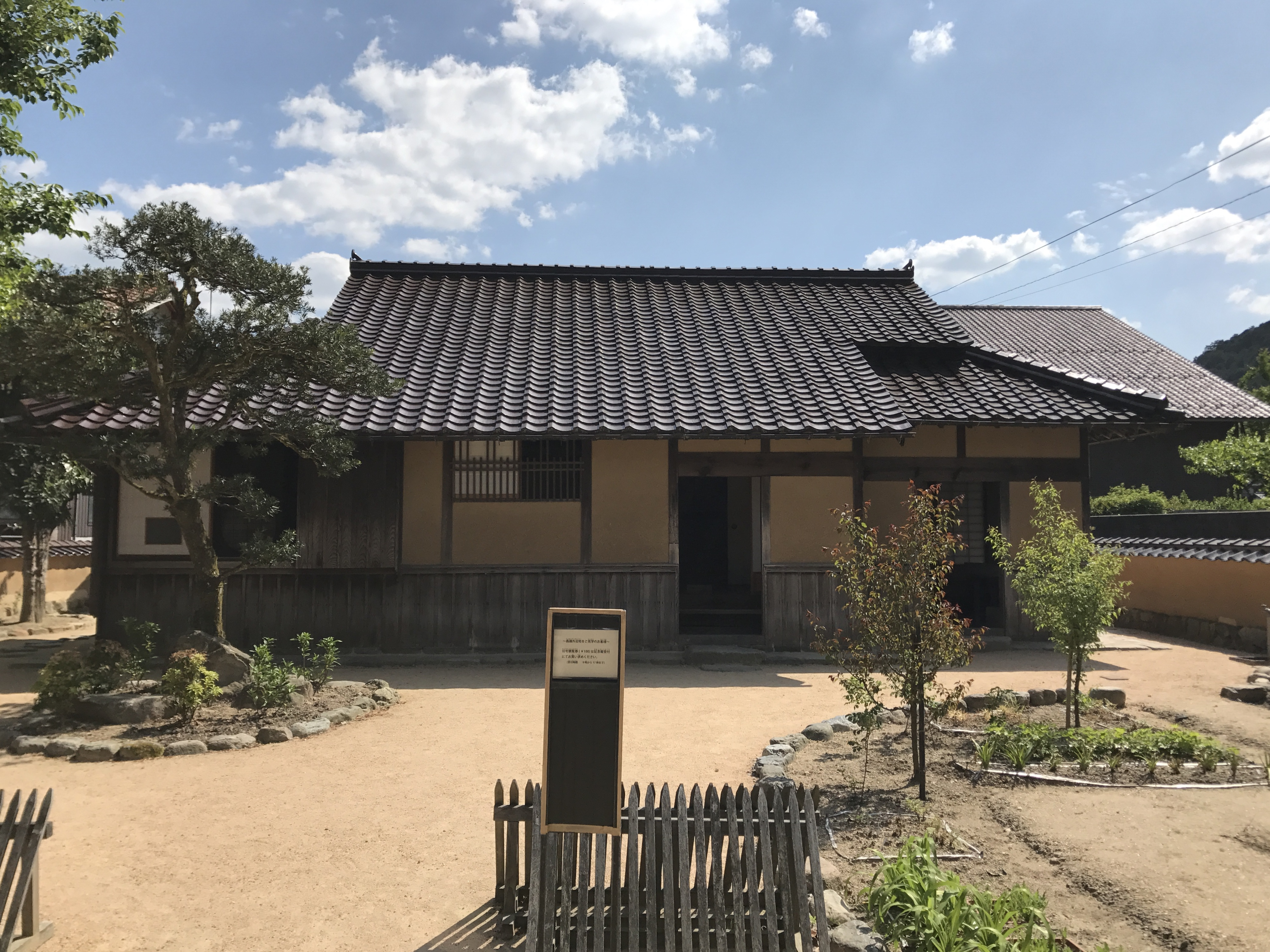
Mori Ōgai birthplace in Tsuwano

The house in Tsuwano where Mori Ōgai was born still exists, and is preserved as a memorial museum. This one-story structure has earthen walls and a tile roof. As the Mori family were doctors, the small room to the left of the entrance was a medicine compounding room, and larger room to the back was for seeing patients. The house faces Nishi Amane's former residence across the Tsuwano River, and is in a neighborhood called "Yokobori", so named because the outer moat of Tsuwano Castle passed to the side of the residence. Mori Ōgai lived in this building for only 11 years, from his birth until he departed for Tokyo in 1872 and the age of 11. He never returned to Tsuwano or visited this house again; however, in his writings he reminisced that his childhood home was in a compound surrounded by earthen walls and had a gate like a samurai residence. The house was relocated to another location within Tsuwano at one point, but in 1954, on the 33rd anniversary of his death, the town of Tsuwano bought it and restored it to its original site. It was designated as a National Historic Site in 1969. Due to its deterioration, it was dismantled and completely repaired in the fall of 1984.

== Honours ==
From the Japanese Wikipedia article

=== Decorations ===
- Order of the Golden Kite, 3rd Class (1 April 1906; Fourth Class: 20 September 1895)
- Grand Cordon of the Order of the Sacred Treasure (24 April 1915; Third Class: 29 November 1904; Fourth Class: 31 May 1900; Fifth Class: 25 November 1896; Sixth Class: 24 November 1894)
- Grand Cordon of the Order of the Rising Sun (7 November 1915; Second Class: 1 April 1906; Sixth Class: 20 September 1895)

=== Court ranks in the order of precedence ===
- Seventh rank (February 1882)
- Sixth rank (28 December 1891)
- Senior sixth rank (16 December 1893)
- Fifth rank (15 November 1895)
- Senior fifth rank (10 July 1899)
- Fourth rank (13 September 1904)
- Senior fourth rank (20 October 1909)
- Third rank (10 November 1914)
- Senior third rank (10 May 1916)
- Second rank (9 July 1922; posthumous)

== Selected works ==
- Maihime (舞姫, The Dancing Girl (1890))
- Utakata no ki (うたかたの記, Foam on the Waves (1890))
- Fumizukai (文づかひ, The Courier (1891))
- Wita sekusuarisu (ヰタ・セクスアリス, Vita Sexualis (1909))
- Seinen (青年, Young Men (1910))
- Gan (雁, The Wild Geese; 1911–1913)
- Okitsu Yagoemon no isho (興津弥五右衛門の遺書, The Last Testament of Okitsu Yagoemon (1912))
- Sanshō Dayū (山椒大夫, Sanshō the Steward (1915))
- Takasebune (高瀬舟, The Boat on the Takase River (1916))
- Shibue Chūsai (渋江抽斎, Shibue Chusai (1916))
- Izawa Ranken (伊澤蘭軒, Izawa Ranken (1916–17))
- Hojo Katei (北条霞亭, Hojo Katei (1917–18))

== Film adaptations ==
- The Abe Clan (1938), directed by Hisatora Kumagai
- The Wild Geese (1953), directed by Shirō Toyoda
- Sansho the Bailiff (1954), directed by Kenji Mizoguchi, is based on a short story by the author and is considered a milestone in Japanese movie history.
- The Abe Clan (1995), directed by Kinji Fukasaku

== Translations ==
- The Columbia Anthology of Modern Japanese Literature: From Restoration to Occupation, 1868–1945 (Modern Asian Literature Series) (vol. 1), ed. J. Thomas Rimer and Van C. Gessel. 2007. Contains "The Dancing Girl," and "Down the Takase River."
- Modern Japanese Stories: An Anthology, ed. Ivan Morris. 1961. Rutland, Vt.: Charles E. Tuttle, 1966. Contains "Under Reconstruction."
- The Historical Fiction of Mori Ôgai, ed. David A. Dilworth and J. Thomas Rimer. 1977. Honolulu: University of Hawaii Press, 1991. A one-volume paperback edition of an earlier two-volume collection of stories.
- Sansho-Dayu and Other Short Stories, trans. Tsutomu Fukuda. Tokyo: Hokuseido Press, 1970.
- Vita Sexualis, trans. Kazuji Ninomiya and Sanford Goldstein. 1972. Boston: Tuttle Publishing, 200.
- The Wild Geese, trans. Ochiai Kingo and Sanford Goldstein. Boston: Tuttle Publishing, 1959.
- The Wild Goose, trans. Burton Watson. 1995. Ann Arbor: University of Michigan Center for Japanese Studies, 1998.
- Youth and Other Stories (collection of stories), ed. J. Thomas Rimer. 1994. Honolulu: University of Hawaii Press, 1995

== See also ==
- Kokura
- Takasebune
