= Bin Ueda =

Japanese writer

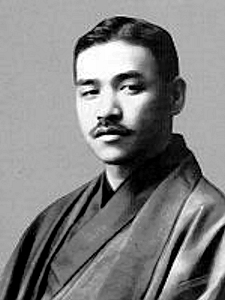
Bin Ueda.

Bin Ueda (上田 敏, Ueda Bin, October 30, 1874 – July 9, 1916) was a Japanese writer.

Born in Tsukiji, Tokyo, he graduated from Tokyo Imperial University. His major work is Kaichoon 海潮音 (The Sound of the Tide, 1905), a collection of translations from Western poets by Ueda himself.
