= Yosano Akiko =

Japanese poet

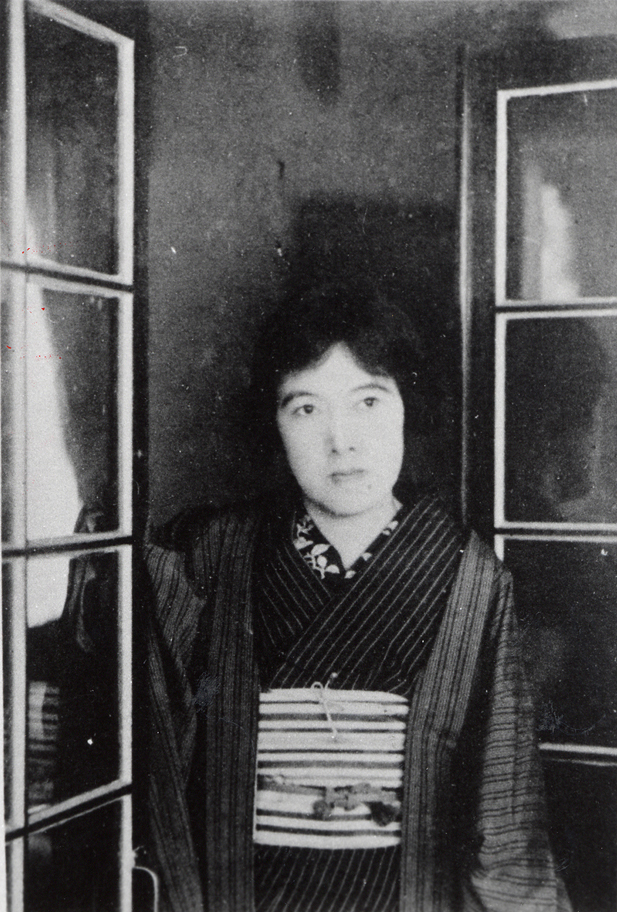
- Born: Hō Shō; 7 December 1878; Sakai, Osaka, Japan
- Died: 29 May 1942 (aged 63); Tokyo, Japan
- Occupations: Writer, educator
- Spouse: Tekkan Yosano
- Children: 13
- Writing career
- Genres: poetry, essays
- Notable work: Kimi Shinitamou koto nakare

Yosano Shō (与謝野 志やう (Note: Her real name was in historical kana orthography and was therefore pronounced as "Shō" and not "Shiyau" as in modern orthography.); née Hō (鳳); 7 December 1878 – 29 May 1942), known by her pen name Yosano Akiko (Shinjitai: 与謝野 晶子, Kyūjitai: 與謝野 晶子, Japanese pronunciation: [jo.sa.no (|) aꜜ.kʲi̥.ko]), was a Japanese author, poet, feminist, pacifist, and social reformer, active from the late Meiji era through the Taishō and early Shōwa eras of Japan. She is one of the most noted, and most controversial, post-classical female poets of the country.

== Early life ==
Yosano was born as Hō Shō (鳳 志やう) into a prosperous merchant family in Sakai, near Osaka. From the age of 11, she was the family member most responsible for running the family business, which produced and sold yōkan, a type of confection. From early childhood, Yosano was fond of reading literary works, and read widely in her father's extensive library. As a high school student, she began to subscribe to the poetry magazine Myōjō (Bright Star), of which she became a prominent contributor. Myōjō's editor, Tekkan Yosano, whom she later married, taught her tanka poetry, having met her on visits to Osaka and Sakai to deliver lectures and teach workshops.

In her youth, Yosano had not been allowed opportunities to interact with the opposite sex, which she cited as the cause for her latent sexuality. She was not allowed to leave her home unaccompanied and could count the number of times she had crossed the threshold of someone else's home. After being married she reflected negatively upon her childhood, saying, "I realized for the first time how jaundiced, unfair, and dark my childhood had been."

Tekkan was married when he met Akiko, and left his wife for her a year after they met one another. The two poets started a new life together in a suburb of Tokyo. They married in 1901, when Yosano was 23, and went on to have 13 children, 11 of whom lived to adulthood. Tekkan had extramarital affairs during their marriage, including with his ex-wife.

== Midaregami ==
In 1901, Yosano brought out her first volume of tanka, Midaregami (Tangled Hair), which contained 399 poems and was mostly denounced by literary critics. The majority are love poems through which Akiko expresses her feelings toward Tekkan Yosano. It was through this particular collection that she set an image for herself as well as the stage for female voices in modern Japan. The poems tended to express femininity in a manner unconventional for her time, especially from a female writer. In traditional Japanese values, women are perceived as (and are expected to be) gentle and modest. The domestic and societal roles of Japanese women were and are focused on procreation and raising children, especially boys. Midaregami not only expressed concepts and/or issues that pertain to women and were not normally voiced in such a public manner, but also created a new, revolutionary image of womanhood, as lively, free, sexual, and assertive, nothing at all like the conventional picture of the expected modest, demure young lady. Yosano's women were not passive, but active agents of their love lives. In a typical tanka, Yosano wrote: "'Spring is short; what is there that has eternal life?' I said, and made his hands seek out my powerful breasts." The Midaregami posed a challenge to the patriarchal values of Japanese society, as well as to the accepted literary and cultural conventions of her time.

Although Akiko Yosano's work was denounced and severely criticized, it served as a great source of inspiration to women of her day. The collection was widely read and became a sort of lighthouse for free-thinkers of the time. Her first book, by far her best-known, brought a passionate individualism to traditional tanka poetry, unlike any other work of the late Meiji period. The American scholar Hiromi Tsuchiya Dollase wrote, "The visual representations of flesh, lips and breasts symbolize women's sexuality".

No poet had written of breasts in a tanka before, which led the poet Nobutsuna Sasaki to attack her in a magazine article for "corrupting public morals" and "mouthing obscenities fit for a whore". From the examples in the Midaregami, the idea of nudity changed the way Japanese people viewed eroticism and female sexuality. Up until this point women's breasts were a symbol for child feeding and motherhood. From then on they began to take on a different representation; that of natural beauty, and especially that of young women. A door was opened for Japanese women to imagine new representations of sexuality and the female body.

== A poet's life ==
Yosano followed Midaregami with twenty more tanka anthologies over the course of her career, including Koigoromo (Robe of Love) and Maihime (Dancer). Her husband Tekkan, the poet's reputation was eclipsed by hers. He continued to publish his wife's work and to encourage her in her career. Yosano was an extraordinarily prolific writer. She could produce as many as 50 poems in one sitting. During the course of her lifetime, Yosano is thought to have written between 20,000 and 50,000 poems. She also wrote 11 books of prose, many of which were neglected by contemporary literary critics and audiences.

Yosano helped to found what was originally a girls' school, the Bunka Gakuin (Institute of Culture), together with Nishimura Isaku, Natsu Kawasaki and others, and became its first dean and chief lecturer. She assisted many aspiring writers to gain a foothold in the literary world. She was a lifelong advocate of women's education. She also translated the Japanese classics into modern Japanese, including the Shinyaku Genji Monogatari (Newly Translated Tale of Genji) and Shinyaku Eiga Monogatari (Newly Translated Tale of Flowering Fortunes).

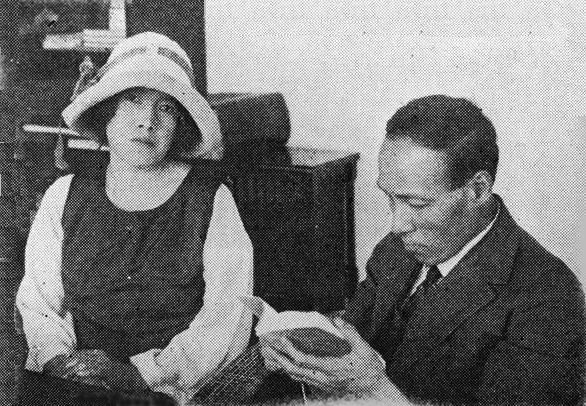
Akiko and her husband, Tekkan Yosano

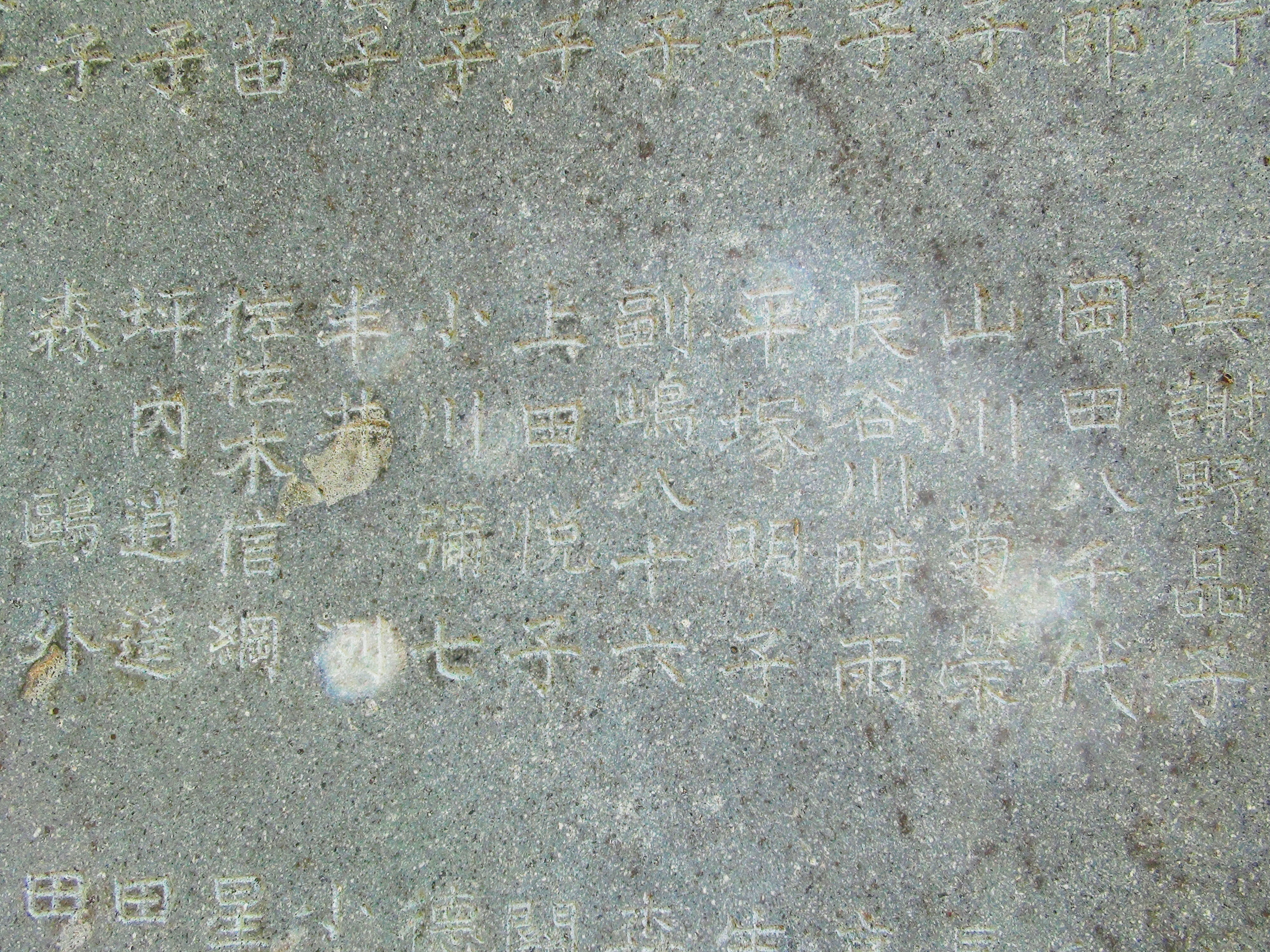
Engraved on the back of the Ichiyo Higuchi monument. The names of sponsors Yosano Akiko and Mori Ogai can be confirmed. (Taken 8 April 2011)

Yosano's poem Kimi Shinitamou koto nakare (君死にたもうこと勿れ, Thou Shalt Not Die), addressed to her younger brother, was published in Myōjō during the height of the Russo-Japanese War and was extremely controversial. Made into a song, it was used as a mild form of anti-war protest, as the number of Japanese casualties from the bloody Siege of Port Arthur became public. In September 1904, Yosano had learned that Japanese soldiers at Port Arthur were being used as "human bullets", being strapped with explosives and sent to blast holes through the Russian barbed wire entanglements in suicide missions. Yosano's younger brother was serving in the Imperial Army and attached to the forces besieging Port Arthur. In Bushido, it was the highest honor for a man to die for the Emperor, and knowing of her brother's impulsive nature, Yosano was seized with the fear that he might volunteer to be a "human bullet", inspiring her to write a poem pleading with him to think of his widowed mother.

Addressed to her brother, Yosano wrote: "Did our parents make you grasp the sword and teach you to kill? For you what does it matter whether the fortress of Lüshun [Port Arthur] falls or not?" Yosano attacked the central concept of Bushido in the Kimi, noting that it was the greatest honor for a man to die for the Emperor, who she sarcastically noted never put himself in harm's way, expecting others to die for him. For calling the war with Russia senseless and stupid, Yosano made herself into Japan's most controversial poet, and the government attempted to ban her poem. The Kimi was so unpopular that Yosano's house was stoned by angry people while she became involved in a rancorous debate with the journalist Ōmachi Keigetsu over the question of whether poets had the duty to support the war or not.

The first issue of the literary journal Seito in September 1911 featured her poem "The Day the Mountains Move" asking for woman to be given equal rights. In a 1918 article, Yosano attacked "the ruling and military class which deliberately block the adoption of a truly moral system in an effort to protect the wealth and influence of their families...They hurry to invoke the power and precepts of the old totalitarian moral codes to direct the lives of Japanese citizens". Yosano ended her article by calling militarism a form of "barbarian thinking which is the responsibility of us women to eradicate from our midst".

Yosano gave birth to 13 children, of whom 11 survived to adulthood. The late Japanese politician Yosano Kaoru was one of her grandsons.

== Feminist perspective ==
Yosano Akiko frequently wrote for the all-women literary magazine Seitō (Bluestocking), as well as other publications. Her opinions were rooted in the concept of equally partaking in child rearing, financial independence, and social responsibility.

=== On financial independence ===
Yosano Akiko disagreed with the concept of mothers seeking financial independence through the help of the government, claiming that dependence on the state and dependence on men are one and the same. In her essay titled "Woman's Complete Independence," or Joshi no tettei shita dokuritsu (女性の徹底した独立), she says:

Even if the male has this kind of economic guarantee, if the woman still lacks it, then she should avoid marriage and childbirth. If a woman depends on her man's finances for marriage and childbirth, even if there is a romantic relationship between them, then the woman is economically dependent on him and becomes the man's slave, or otherwise she is a thief who preys on the fruits of the man's labor.

This viewpoint was diametrically opposed to many Japanese feminists' shared opinion at the time that the government should financially support mothers, including one of the five founders of Seitō, Raichō Hiratsuka. Raichō criticized this, saying that most women cannot realistically live without financial assistance.

=== On motherhood ===
Despite giving birth to thirteen children in her lifetime, Yosano stated that she did not consider the act of giving birth to be the main part of her identity. She also expressed worry that fully equating the identity of womanhood with motherhood prioritizes motherhood over the other aspects of a person.

I believe that making motherhood absolute and giving supremacy to motherhood, as Ellen Key does, among all the innumerable hopes and desires that arise as women undulate on the surface of life, serves to keep women entrapped in the old unrealistic way of thinking that gives a ranking to the innumerable desires and roles which should have equal value for the individual.

"Akiko had, in effect, redefined the meaning of the term and seized it as a tool of liberation. "Chastity" no longer meant safeguarding the womb; it meant the totality of a woman's sexuality, the totality of the female self, the chastity of the self. Akiko saw that the emphasis on woman as sexual object and her acceptance of that definition had had a stultifying effect on her sense of self".

This was written in response to Swedish feminist Ellen Key and Leo Tolstoy in her Taiyō magazine column, "One Woman's Notebook," in January 1915. Her main assertion is that women could accept roles as mothers, but exemplified more than that role: as friends, as wives, as Japanese citizens, and as members of the world.

Yosano believed that motherhood is something that shouldn't be controlled by the government, as even in a feminist light, there is no real difference from living for a man. She believed that marriage and life should be done cooperatively, and that living with one gender over the other would have "tragic consequences" for all involved.

== Turn to the right ==
During the Taishō period, Yosano turned her attention to social commentary, with Hito oyobi Onna to shite (As a Human and as a Woman), Gekido no Naka o Iku (Going through Turbulent Times) and her autobiography Akarumi e (To the Light). In 1931, Yosano, Japan's most famous pacifist, succumbed to the "war fever" that gripped Japan when the Kwantung Army seized Manchuria. In a poem from 1932, "Rosy-Cheeked Death" concerning the First Battle of Shanghai, Yosano supported her country against China, though she also portrayed the Chinese soldiers killed in the battle as victims, albeit only of Chiang Kai-shek, who she accused of betraying the legacy of Dr. Sun Yet-sen, who always preached Sino-Japanese friendship. In "Rosy-Cheeked Death", the Chinese are "foolish" to resist Japan because Japan is a "good neighbor" whom they could never hope to defeat, making their resistance futile.

In her poem "Citizens of Japan, A Morning Song" published in June 1932, Yosano embraced Bushido as she praised a Japanese soldier for dying for the Emperor at the First Battle of Shanghai as she described how the soldier "scatters" his body when he is blown apart as a "human bomb". Yosano called the "scattered" body of the soldier "purer than a flower, giving life to a samurai's honor". Unlike the Kimi, Yosano called for Japanese women to "unify in loyalty" for the "cause of the Emperor's forces". The American scholar Steven Robson noted that unlike the Kimi, which like the rest of Yosano's early poetry was extremely innovative, Citizens of Japan is cliche-ridden as Yosano used well-known phrases like "a samurai's honor" taken straight from the ultra-nationalist press without developing a vocabulary of her own. Yosano ended her poem by praising Bushido, declaring that the "purest" act a Japanese man could perform was to die for the Emperor in battle and urged the Kwantung Army forward onward in the conquest of Manchuria "through suffering a hundredfold" to "smash the sissified dreams of compromise".

Yosano's poems from 1937 onward support the war against China, and in 1941, she supported war against the United States and the United Kingdom. Her late commentaries in the early Showa years tended to praise militarism, and also promoted her feminist viewpoints. Her final work, Shin Man'yōshū (New Man'yōshū, 1937–39) was a compilation of 26,783 poems by 6,675 contributors, written over a 60-year period.

In 1942, in one of her last poems, Yosano praised her son who was serving as a lieutenant in the Imperial Navy, urging him to "fight bravely" for the Emperor in "this sacred war". Yosano died of a stroke in 1942 at the age of 63. Her death, occurring in the middle of the Pacific War, went almost unnoticed in the press, and after the end of the war, her works were largely forgotten by critics and the public. In the 1950s, the Kimi was made mandatory reading in Japanese high schools, and during the protests led by idealistic university students against the government of Nobusuke Kishi, whose intention was to do away with Article 9 of the constitution, the Kimi became something of an anthem for the students. Her romantic, sensual style has come back into popularity in recent years, and she has an ever-increasing following. Her grave is at Tama Cemetery in Fuchu, Tokyo.

== Works ==
- Midaregami (みだれ髪) 1901
- Kimi Shinitamou Koto Nakare (君死にたもうこと勿れ) 1904

== In popular culture ==
- The 1988 film A Chaos of Flowers (華の乱), directed by Kinji Fukasaku, features Yosano Akiko as the viewpoint character.
- A character named after and based on Yosano Akiko is a supporting character in the manga and anime franchise Bungo Stray Dogs.

== See also ==
- Japanese literature
- List of Japanese authors
- List of peace activists
