= Tekkan Yosano =

Japanese writer

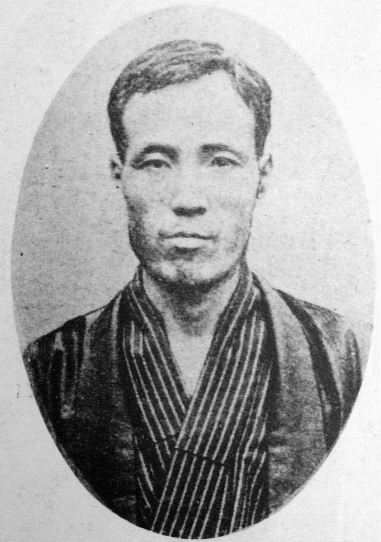
- Yosano c. 1933-1934
- Born: 25 February 1873; Kyoto, Japan
- Died: 26 March 1935 (aged 62); Tokyo, Japan
- Occupation: Writer
- Spouse: Akiko Yosano
- Writing career
- Genres: Poetry, essays

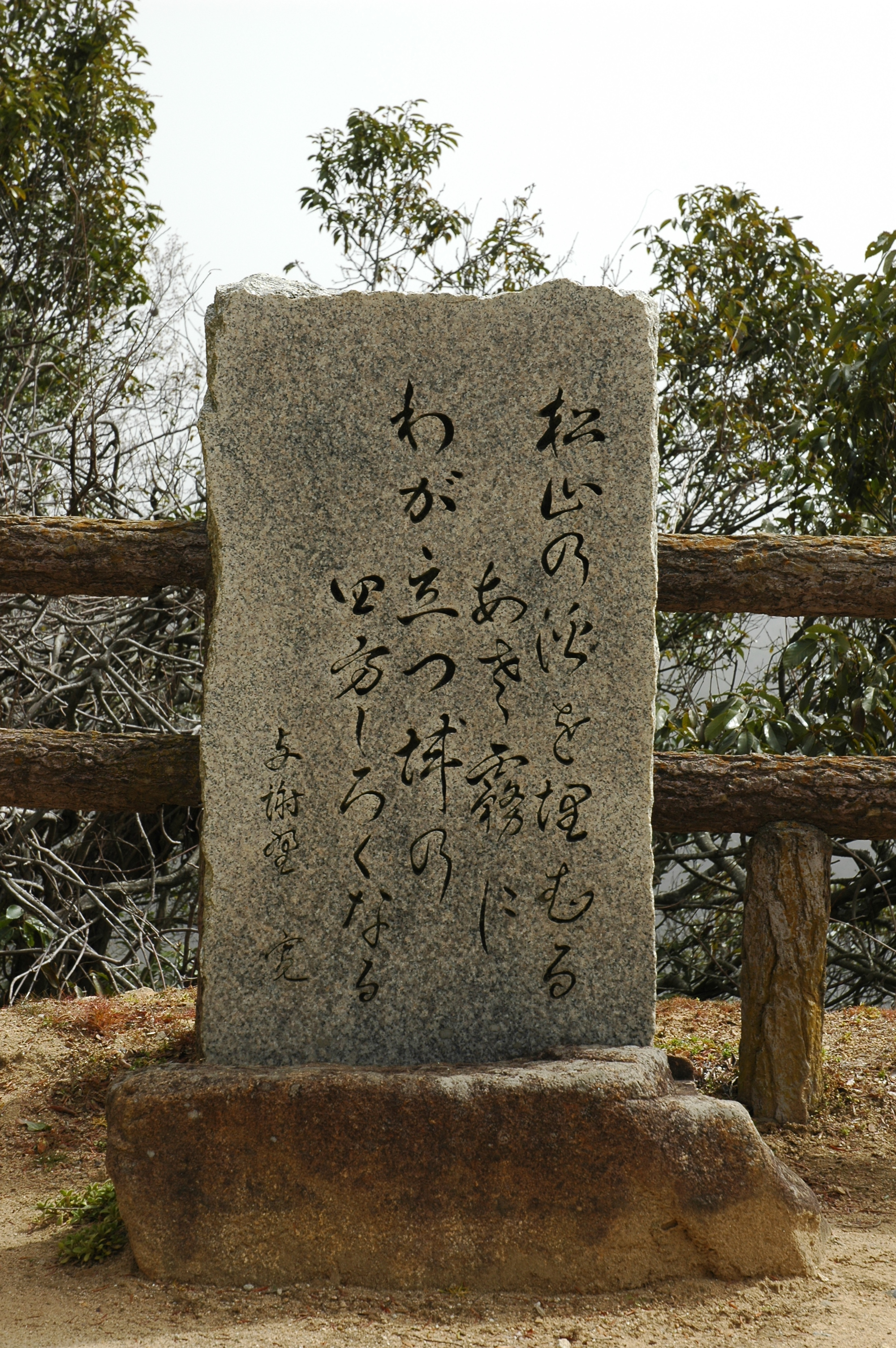
A monument to Tekkan Yosano at Bitchu-Matsuyama Castle

Yosano Hiroshi (与謝野 寛; 26 February 1873 – 26 March 1935), known by his pen name Tekkan Yosano (与謝野 鉄幹 or 與謝野 鐵幹, Yosano Tekkan) was a Japanese author and poet active in late Meiji, Taishō, and early Shōwa era. His wife was fellow author Yosano Akiko. His grandson was politician Kaoru Yosano.

== Early life ==
Yosano was born in Kyoto as the son of Buddhist priest, and was a graduate of Keio University. After graduation, he taught Japanese language for four years at Tokuyama Girls' School, in what is now Shunan city, Yamaguchi prefecture. He was forced to quit over alleged improprieties with one of his students. At the age of 20, he moved to Tokyo. He supported himself as a staff writer for Tokyo newspapers. On 11 May 1894, he published a strongly worded article encouraging the reform of traditional Japanese poetry, or waka, to give it more originality and thus make it more popular.

== Literary career ==
Yosano was a disciple of Ochiai Naobumi, and a prominent founding member of the latter's Asaka Society.

In 1900, Yosano founded the literary magazine Myōjō (Bright Star), and soon collected a circle of famous poets, including Kitahara Hakushū, Yoshii Isamu and Ishikawa Takuboku. The magazine was immediately popular with young poets who shared Yosano's enthusiasm for revitalizing waka through the medium of tanka poetry. One of the earliest contributors to his magazine was a young woman named Hō Shō, better known by her pen-name (after her marriage to Yosano) Yosano Akiko.

Yosano's own works include Bokoku no on (Sounds of a Decaying Country, 1894), which despite its title was a collection of literary criticism, and Tōzai namboku (East-west, north–south, 1896), an anthology of his poetry, mostly tanka, but also several shintaishi and renga.He published a poetry collection "Kasi no ha" including the first Gogyōshi collection "Syōkyoku" in 1910.

Yosano is also one of the five authors of the essays 5 Pairs of Shoes.

== See also ==
- Japanese literature
- List of Japanese authors
- Yosa District, Kyoto - Tekkan's father's birthplace. The origin of Tekkan's family name Yosano.
