= Nagayo =

Nagayo (Japanese:長与 or 長與) may refer to:

== Places ==
- Nagayo, Nagasaki, a city in the Nagasaki Prefecture

== People ==
- Chigusa Nagayo (長与千種, born 1964), a Japanese professional wrestler
- Nagayo Sensai (長與專齋, 1838–1902), a Japanese doctor and politician
- Mataro Nagayo (長與專齋, 1878–1941), a Japanese pathologist
- Rika Nagayo (長与梨加, born 1993), a Japanese actress
- Shokichi Nagayo (長與稱吉, 1866–1910), a Japanese doctor
- Shuntatsu Nagayo (長与俊達, 1790–1855), a Japanese doctor
- Yoshirō Nagayo (長與善郎, 1888–1961), a Japanese novelist and playwright

== Other uses ==
- Nagayo River, a river in the Nagasaki Prefecture
