= Ashimori Domain =

Administrative division in western Japan during the Edo period (1601-1871)

Ashimori Domain 足守藩
- Domain of Japan
- 1601–1871
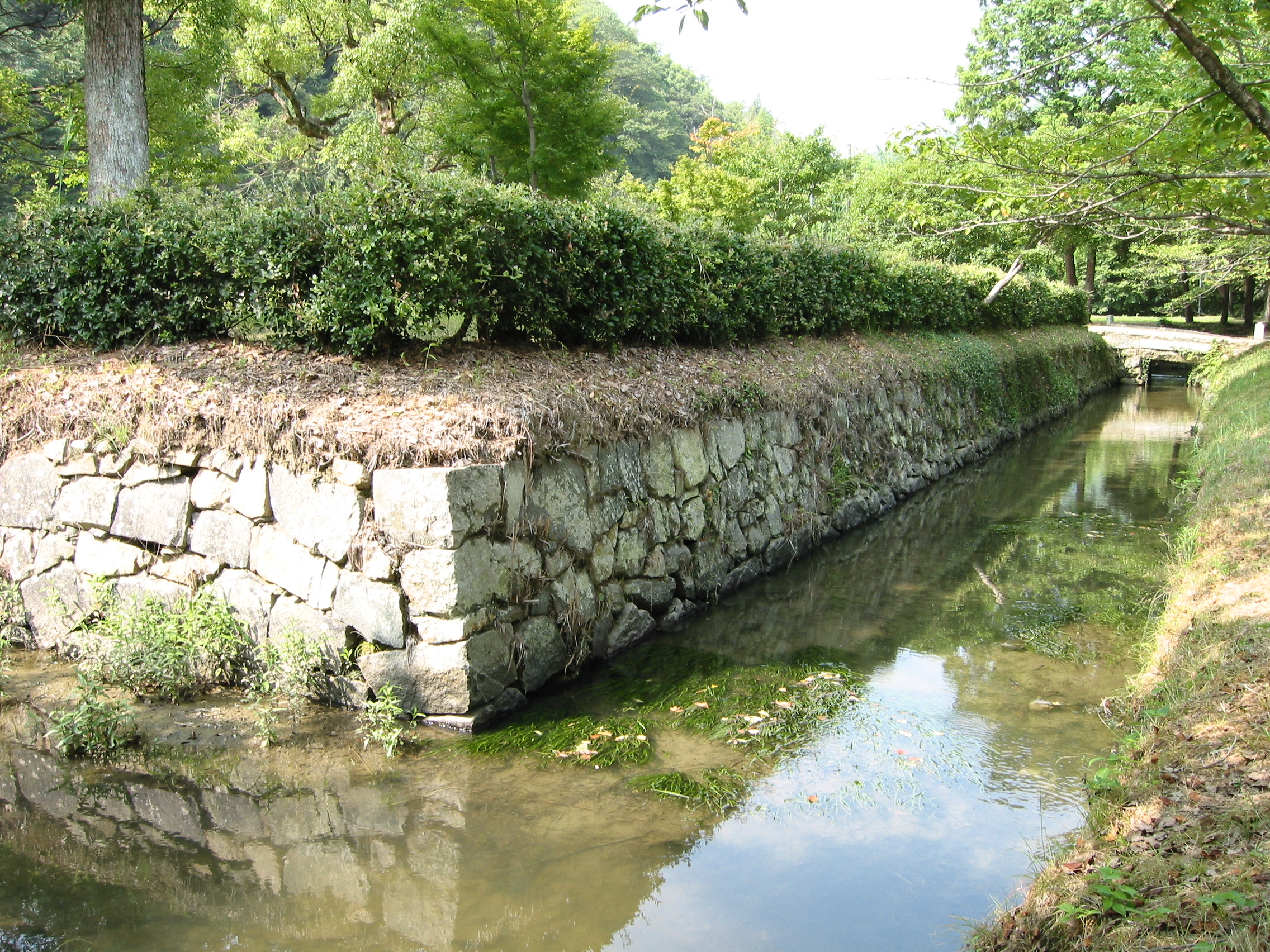
- Site of Ashimori jin'ya

- Mon of the Kinoshita clan
- Capital: Ashimori jin'ya
- Area
  - Coordinates: 34°38′34.1″N 133°50′57″E
- Historical era: Edo period
  - Established: 1601
  - Abolition of the han system: 1871
- Contained within
  - Province: Bitchū Province
- Today part of: Okayama Prefecture

Location of Ashimori jin'ya
Ashimori Domain (Japan)

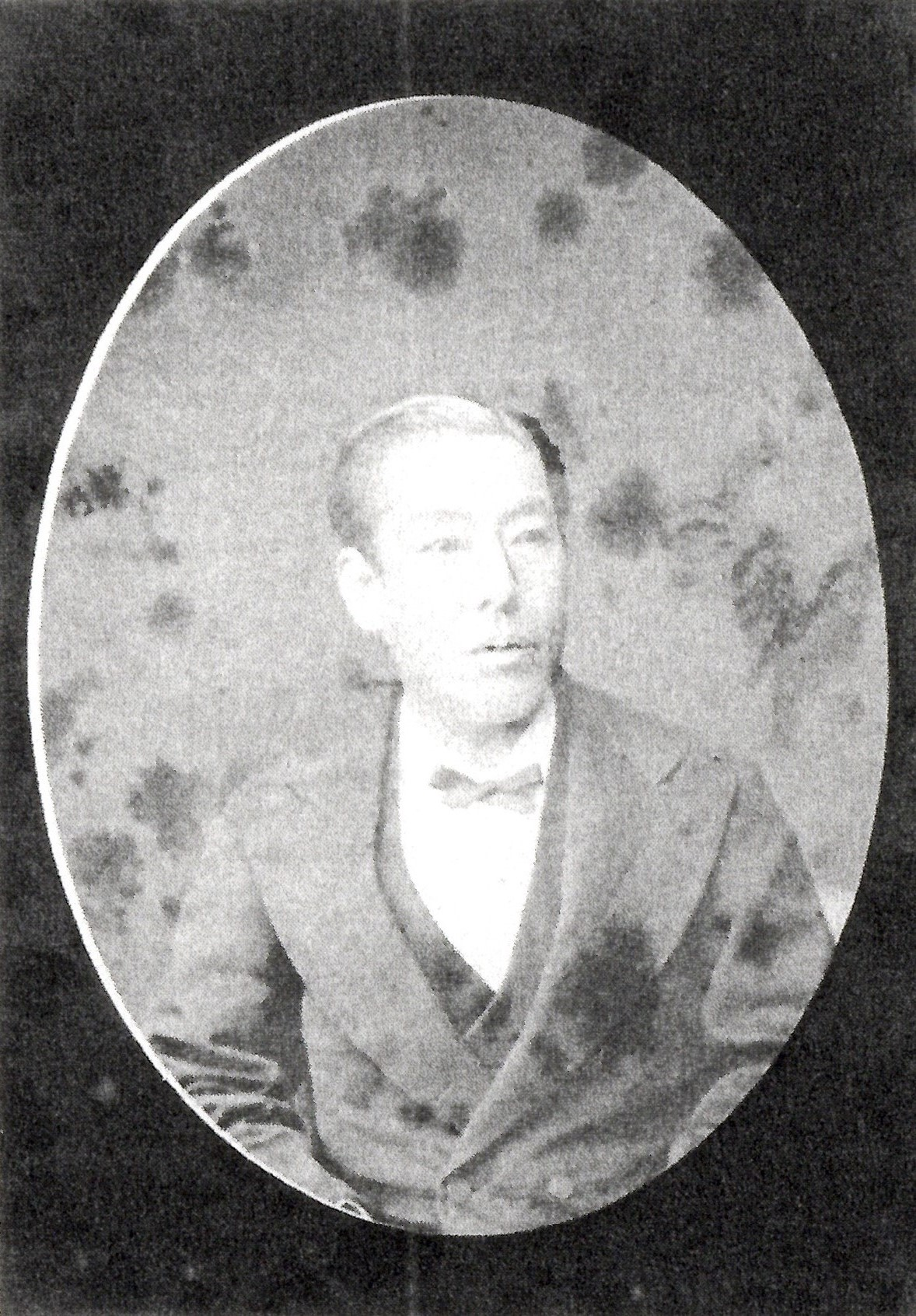
Kinoshita Toshiyasu, last ruler of Ashimori Domain

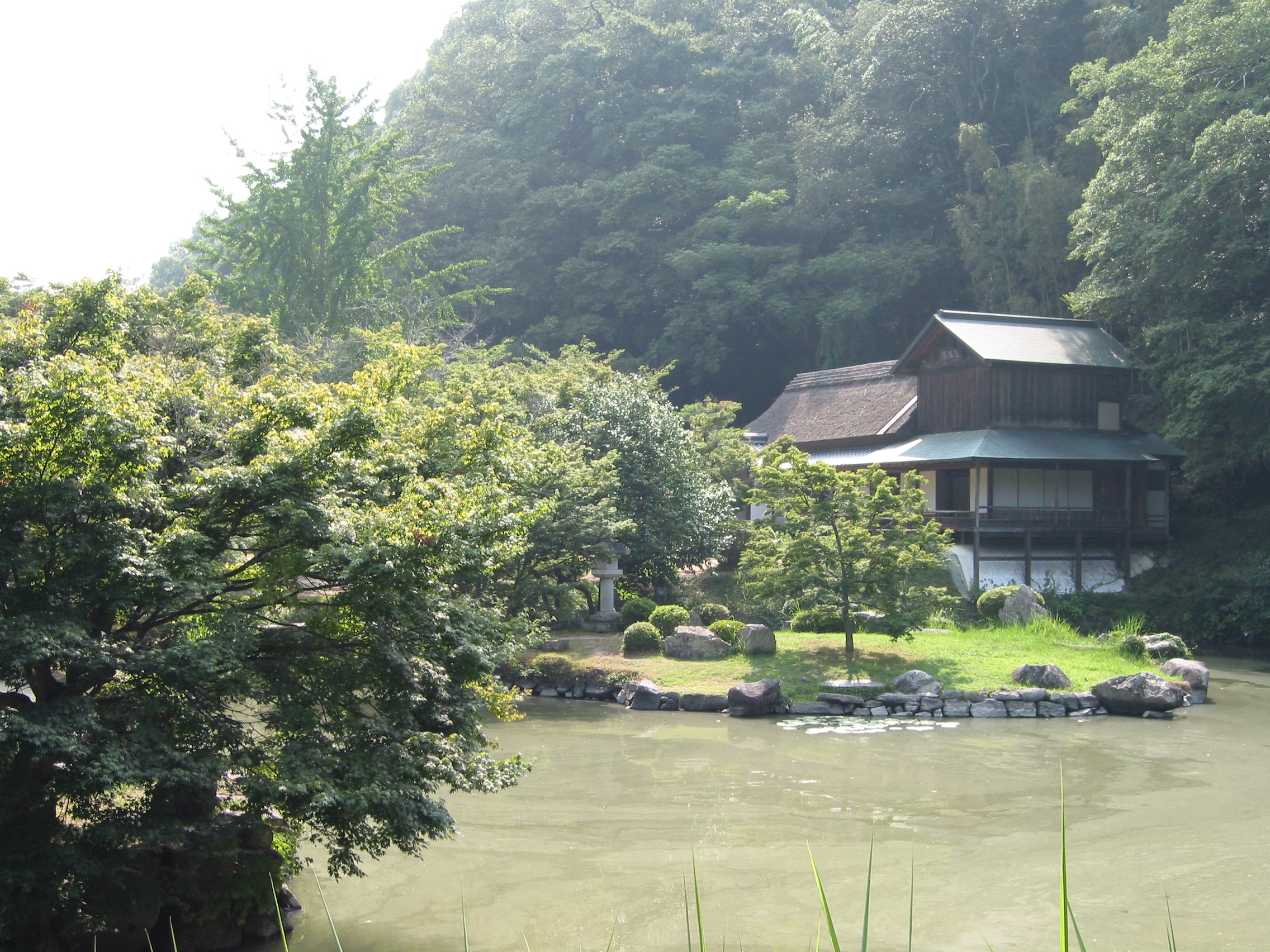
Remnants of the gardens of Ashimori jin'ya

Ashimori Domain (足守藩, Ashimori-han) was a feudal domain under the Tokugawa shogunate of Edo period Japan, in what is now central Okayama Prefecture. It controlled a small portion of eastern Bitchū Province and was centered around Ashimori jin'ya in what is now Kita-ku, Okayama. It was ruled for most its history by a branch of the Kinoshita clan. It was dissolved in the abolition of the han system in 1871 and is now part of Okayama Prefecture. Rangaku scholar Ogata Kōan, who founded Tekijuku academy, the predecessor of Osaka University was from Ashimori Domain.

== History ==
Kinoshita Iesada, the older brother of Toyotomi Hideyoshi's wife Kita no Mandokoro, and the lord of Himeji Castle in Harima Province, was transferred to Ashimori after the Battle of Sekigahara and was confirmed in his previous kokudaka of 25,000 koku. When he died in 1608, the Tokugawa shogunate instructed that the domain be divided between his sons Katsutoshi and Toshifusa, but Katsutoshi monopolized the estate, so the shogunate ruled that it was a violation of the shogun's orders and in 1609 Kinoshita Katsutoshi was dispossessed.

In 1610, Asano Nagaakira, the second son of Asano Nagamasa was assigned Ashimori, but when his older brother Asano Yoshinaga died in 1613, he inherited the clan's main estates in Wakayama, and later became daimyō of Hiroshima Domain.

In 1615, Kinoshita Toshifusa, who had distinguished himself at the Siege of Osaka recovered Ashimori Domain from the shogunate. The Kinoshita clan ruled Ashimori for 256 years over 12 generations until the end of the Edo period. However, in 1799, about 22,000 koku of the fief owned by the 9th daimyō, Kinoshita Toshihisa, was transferred to Date and Shinobu counties in Mutsu Province (now part of Fukushima Prefecture). This made the domain very difficult to govern, and the finances of the clan, which was by no means rich, fell into dire straits. In 1831, per the petitions of the 11th daimyō Kinoshita Toshichika, about half of the relocated land was changed back to lands in Bitchū Province, but it was not until 1870, after the Meiji Restoration, that all of the domain's the former territories in Bitchū were restored.The domain sided with the imperial government in the Boshin War and forces led by Kinoshita Toshiyasu helped occupy pro-Tokugawa Bitchū-Matsuyama Domain.

In 1871, with the abolition of the han system, Ashimori was incorporated into Okayama prefecture. The ruins of the jin'ya are located northwest of the current Ashimori Elementary School, and are now a park. The building no longer exists, but the moat and portions of the stone walls remain and are an Okayama City Historic Site, while its gardens are an Okaya Prefectural Place of Scenic Beauty.

== Holdings at the end of the Edo period ==
As with most domains in the han system, Ashimori Domain consisted of several discontinuous territories calculated to provide the assigned kokudaka, based on periodic cadastral surveys and projected agricultural yields, g.

- Bitchū Province
  - 34 villages in Kaya District
- Mutsu Province
  - 11 villages in Shinobu District

== List of daimyō ==
#	Name	Tenure	Courtesy title	Court Rank	kokudaka
Kinoshita clan, 1601-1613 (Tozama)
1	Kinoshita Iesada (木下家定)	1601 - 1608	Higo-no-kami (肥後守)	Junior 5th Rank, Lower Grade (従五位下)	25,000 koku
2	Kinoshita Katsutoshi (木下勝俊)	1608 - 1609	Sakon'e-no-shosho (左近衛権少将)	Junior 4th Rank, Lower Grade (従四位下)	25,000 koku
Asano clan, 1610-1613 (Fudai)
1	Asano Nagaakira (浅野長晟)	1610 - 1613	Tajima-no-kami (但馬守)	Junior 4th Rank, Lower Grade (従四位下)	24,000 koku
Kinoshita clan, 1615-1871 (Tozama)
2	Kinoshita Iefusa (木下利房)	1615 - 1637	Kunai-no-suke (宮内少輔)	Junior 5th Rank, Lower Grade (従五位下)	25,000 koku
3	Kinoshita Toshimasa (木下利当)	1637 - 1661	Awaji-no-kami (淡路守)	Junior 5th Rank, Lower Grade (従五位下)	25,000 koku
4	Kinoshita Toshisada (木下利貞)	1662 - 1679	Awaji-no-kami (淡路守)	Junior 5th Rank, Lower Grade (従五位下)	25,000 koku
5	Kinoshita Kinsada (木下㒶定)	1679 - 1729	Higo-no-kami (肥後守)	Junior 5th Rank, Lower Grade (従五位下)	25,000 koku
6	Kinoshita Toshikiyo (木下利潔)	1729 - 1740	Mino-no-kami (美濃守)	Junior 5th Rank, Lower Grade (従五位下)	25,000 koku
7	Kinoshita Toshitada (木下利忠)	1740 - 1784	Higo-no-kami (肥後守)	Junior 5th Rank, Lower Grade (従五位下)	25,000 koku
8	Kinoshita Toshitora (木下利彪)	1784 - 1799	Awaji-no-kami (淡路守)	Junior 5th Rank, Lower Grade (従五位下)	25,000 koku
9	Kinoshita Toshiyoshi (木下利徽)	1799 - 1805	-none-	Junior 5th Rank, Lower Grade (従五位下)	25,000 koku
10	Kinoshita Toshinori (木下利徳)	1805 - 1821	Higo-no-kami (肥後守)	Junior 5th Rank, Lower Grade (従五位下)	25,000 koku
11	Kinoshita Toshichika (木下利愛)	1821 - 1847	Higo-no-kami (肥後守)	Junior 5th Rank, Lower Grade (従五位下)	25,000 koku
12	Kinoshita Toshiyasu (木下利恭)	1847 - 1871	Iwami-no-kami (石見守)	Junior 5th Rank, Lower Grade (従五位下)	25,000 koku

== See also ==
- List of Han
- Abolition of the han system
