= Doppo Kunikida =

Japanese writer and journalist (1871-1908)

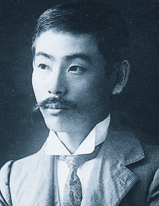
- Kunikida in the 1890s
- Born: Tetsuo Kunikida; 30 August 1871; Chōshi, Chiba, Japan
- Died: 23 June 1908 (aged 36); Chigasaki, Kanagawa, Japan
- Occupations: Writer; journalist
- Spouses: Nobuko Sasaki (m. 1895; div. 1896); Haruko Enomoto (m. 1898–1908)
- Children: 5
- Relatives: Ayumu Nakajima (great-great-grandson)
- Writing career
- Genres: Poetry; short stories; novels; diary
- Literary movement: Naturalism

Doppo Kunikida (国木田 独歩, Kunikida Doppo; 30 August 1871 – 23 June 1908) was a Japanese author of novels and romantic poetry during the Meiji period, noted as one of the inventors of Japanese naturalism.

== Early life and education ==
Doppo Kunikida was born in Chōshi, Chiba as Tetsuo Kunikida. While some doubt exists as to his biological father, Doppo was raised by his mother and her samurai-class husband. The family moved to Tokyo in 1874, but relocated to Yamaguchi prefecture and Doppo grew up in Iwakuni. The rural area of Chōshū left Doppo with a love of nature and influenced the naturalism which later appeared in his literature. Doppo quit school in order to help support his family in 1888, but left for school in Tokyo in 1889.

He studied at the English department of Tōkyō Senmon Gakkō (now Waseda University). Interested in western democracy, he developed a defiant attitude to the school's administration and was expelled from the school in 1891. When he was 21 years old, he was baptized by Uemura Masahisa and became a Christian. His religion and the poetry of William Wordsworth influenced his later writing style.

== Career and personal life ==
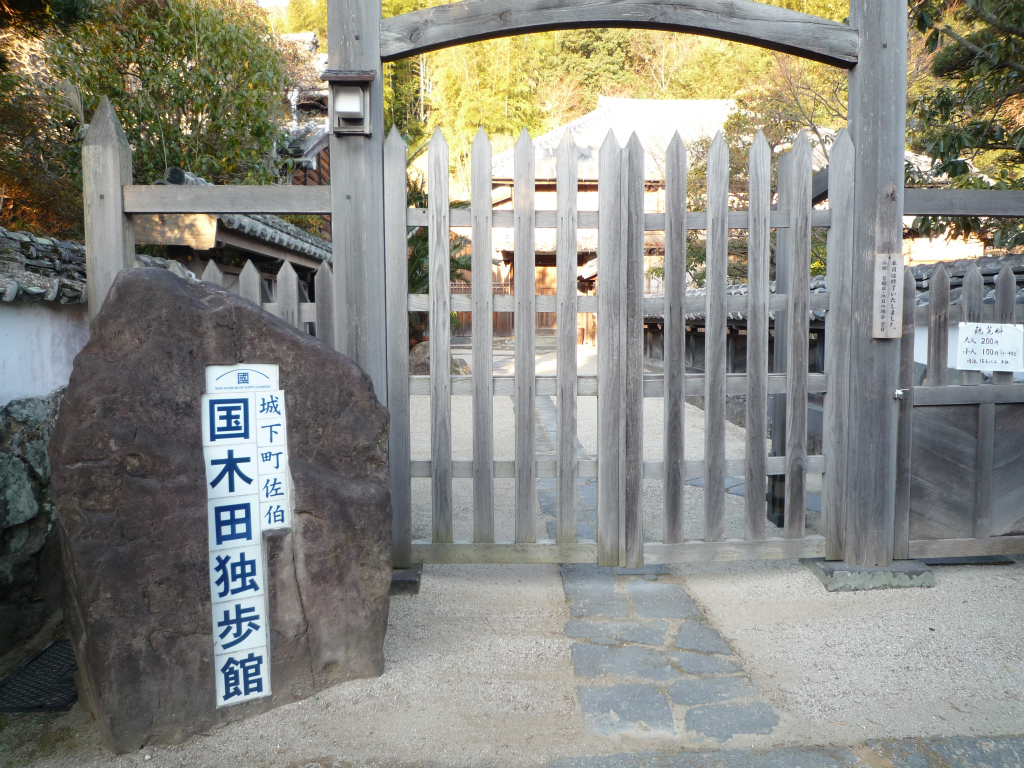
Kunikida's house in Saiki

Kunikida founded a literary magazine Seinen bungaku (青年文學 "Literature for Youth") in 1892 and began his private diary Azamukazaru no ki (欺かざるの記 "An Honest Record", published after his death) in 1893, the same year he began teaching English, mathematics, and history in Saiki, another rural area of Japan.

In 1894, he joined the news staff of the Kokumin Shimbun newspaper as a war correspondent. His reports from the front during the First Sino-Japanese War, which were collected and re-published after his death as Aitei Tsushin, (愛弟通信 "Communiques to a Dear Brother") found high favor among the readers.

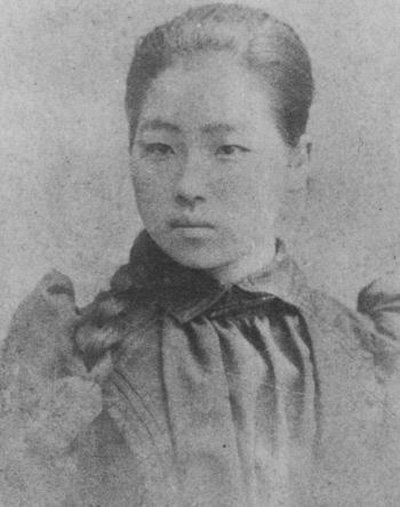
Nobuko Sasaki (20 July 1878 – 22 September 1949)

The following year, Kunikida settled with his parents in Tokyo, where he edited the magazine Kokumin no Tomo (國民の友 "The Nation's Friend") and met his future wife, Nobuko Sasaki, on whom Takeo Arishima is thought to have based his famous novel A Certain Woman. Against her parents' wishes (Nobuko's mother encouraged her to commit suicide rather than marry Doppo), the couple was married in November 1895. Kunikida's ensuing financial difficulties caused the pregnant Nobuko to divorce him after only five months. The failed marriage had a traumatic effect on Doppo, and his depression and mental anguish over the separation can be seen in Azamukazaru no Ki, published from 1908 to 1909.

Shortly after his divorce, Kunikida turned to the genre of romantic poetry when co-authored an anthology, Jojoshi (抒情詩 "Lyric Poems"), in 1897 with Katai Tayama and Kunio Matsuoka (a.k.a. Kunio Yanagita). Around this time, Kunikida published several poems that would eventually be collected in Doppo gin as well as the short story, Gen Oji (源叔父 "Uncle Gen"). Through his poetic style, Kunikida introduced a fresh current into romantic lyrical literature.

Kunikida remarried in 1898, to Haruko Enomoto, and published his first short-story collection, Musashino (武蔵野 "The Musashi Plain") in 1901, which portrayed people who fall behind the times.

However, Kunikida's style began to change. Although Haru no Tori (春の鳥 "Spring Birds"), written in 1904, reportedly reached the highest level of romanticism in his era, his later works, such as Kyushi (窮死 "A Poor Man's Death") and Take no Kido (竹の木戸 "The Bamboo Gate"), Kunikida indicated that he was turning more towards naturalism over romanticism.

Following the Russo-Japanese War in 1905, Kunikida started a publishing business that went bankrupt two years later. The same year he founded a magazine, Fujin Gahō.

== Death ==
Kunikida contracted tuberculosis in 1907 and moved to a sanatorium in Chigasaki in early 1908. He died from the disease in 1908 at the age of 36. His grave is at Aoyama Cemetery in Tokyo.

== Trivia ==
- Doppo Kunikida is mentioned among the saints of the Modernist Cult of Life among the Kappa people, in Ryūnosuke Akutagawa (1927).
- Kunikida is a protagonist in the anime Bungo Stray Dogs, which features major Japanese literary figures, their biographies, and their own works to create fictional characters. Kunikida's abilities in the series pay homage to his works as a poet. In the series, he works with the Armed Detective Agency and has an ability called 'Matchless Poet.' He is friends with the character named after Katai Tayama and the writer's short-lived relationship with Sasaki Nobuko also returns in the series.
- Kunikida also appears in Bungo and Alchemist, a web-based browser game produced by EXNOA and published by DMM.com

== See also ==
- Japanese literature
- List of Japanese writers
