= Gaku Stories =

1985 novel by Makoto Shiina

Gaku Stories / My Boy: A Father's Memories
- Author: Makoto Shiina
- Original title: Gakumonogatari
- Translator: Frederik L. Schodt
- Language: Japanese
- Publication date: 1985
- Publication place: Japan
- English publication date: 1991
- Media type: Print (Paperback)

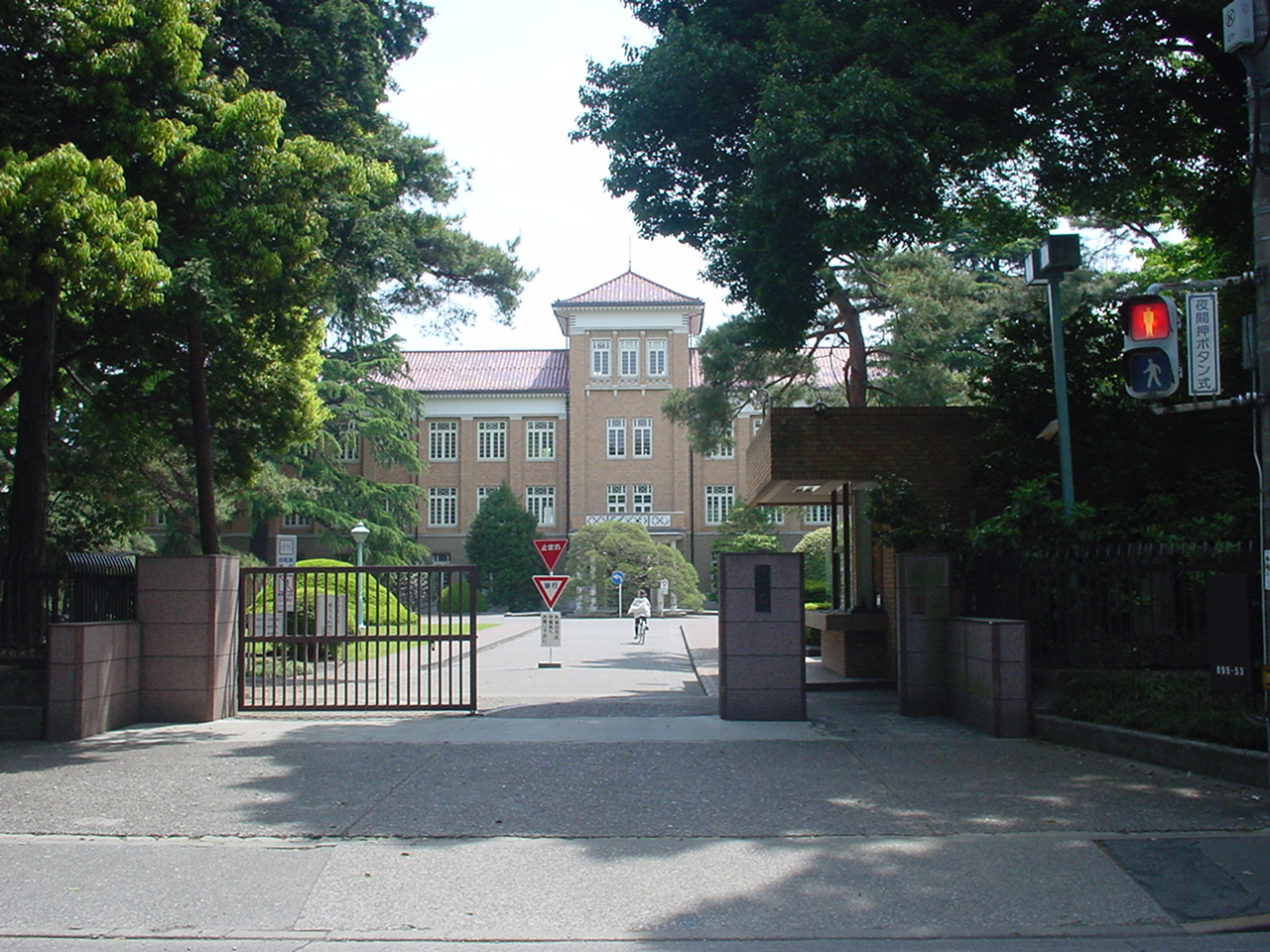
The main setting of the novel is Kodaira, Tokyo. The photo above depicts Tsuda University in Tsuda-chō, where Shiina's home was located.

Gaku Stories (がくものがたり Gakumonogatari), also published under the title My Boy: A Father's Memories, is an I Novel by Japanese author Makoto Shiina. It was published in 1985 by Shueisha. The same publisher also published a sequel, Zoku Gakumonogatari, in 1986.

The title character, Gaku, is modelled on Shiina's eldest son of the same name. And the story, told from Shiina's point of view as a father, depicts the family's life over the course of Gaku's kindergarten days and the six years of elementary school leading up to his enrolment in lower secondary school. It also addresses Gaku's rebellious phase, and the personal growth and independence he achieves through it.

The novel was the first of Shiina's I Novels, and is one of the author's defining works. The novel and its sequel were later edited and rereleased as a single work, Gakumonogatari: Revised Edition (定本 岳物語 Teihon Gakumonogatari), which this article also addresses.

== Outline and author background ==
=== Gaku Stories ===
Published in May 1985 by Shueisha. The novel is composed of nine sections: "Fragrant Olive", "Swallowtail Butterfly", "Indian Trumpet", "Dandelion", "Operation Mackerel Scad", "The Eagle and the Pig", "Thirty Years", "Goby Fishing", and "The Two Day Present". A paperback edition of the novel featuring an afterword by Shigeta Saitō was published by Shuiesha Bunko in September 1989. Both editions of the book were illustrated by Hitoshi Sawano. The book also saw publication in English under two titles: "Gaku Stories", published in 1991 as part of Kodansha's English language collection, and "My Boy: A Father's Memories", published in 1992 by Kodansha International.

The various sections of the novel were serialised between November 1983 and April 1985 in Seishun no Dokusho, a literary magazine published by Shueisha. Initially, there was no plan to serialise Gakumonogatari, but instead to have Shiina pen a thirty-page short story each issue. However, Shiina's first submission for this project - a story called "Fragrant Olive" which starred his son and was the author's first I Novel - received positive feedback from the editor. And this led to the story becoming a serialised I Novel based around Gaku and his family. The work was only given a collective title when the time came to gather the nine sections and publish them as a book, and no title existed at the original time of publication.

Gaku's upbringing took place during a significant period of transition in both the author's work and his family life, as Shiina stumbled into writing from a career as a salaryman. And Shiina found that in his thirties, his early years as a father overlapped with his debut as an author. This made gathering material for a serialised novel difficult, so he began to write about his family life instead, reasoning that the exploits of his mischievous son could easily fill a novel. This was what gave rise to the work.

One point of note is that Yō Watanabe, Gaku's older sister and Shiina's eldest daughter, does not appear in the novel. Shiina has offered two reasons for this. Firstly, he had been unable to find a good opportunity to introduce her in "Fragrant Olive" and "Swallowtail Butterfly, the first two chapters, and after that point, the central theme of the work had become a serialised account of the relationships between members of a family, making it difficult to suddenly introduce an older sister into the mix. Secondly, Yō herself, upon learning that her father was writing stories based on the family, warned him at an early stage not to write about her.

=== Zoku Gakumonogatari ===
Published in July 1986 by Shueisha. Composed of eleven sections: "It's a Bright Spring", "The Boy's Month of May", "Operation Eavesdropping", "The Story of Gaku", "The Mystery of Yokochin", "The Champion Belt", "A Camellia In Winter", "A Spooky Wave", "Bones and Setsubun", "The Scent of Darkness", and "Departure". A paperback edition was published by Shueisha Bunko in November 1989, with an afterword by Tomosuke Noda. As with previous editions, the illustrations were provided by Hitoshi Sawano.

The various sections were serialised in Seishun to Dokusho between May 1985 and June 1986. The stories dealing with Gaku primarily focus on the events that took place during his later years of elementary school, depicting his rebellious days and his struggles to assert his independence from his father and find his feet as a young man. And the story closes with "Departure", a chapter which depicts the gyōza party thrown for Gaku to celebrate his entry into lower secondary school, as well as the day of his welcome ceremony.

=== Gakumonogatari: Revised Edition ===
Published in August 1998 by Shueisha. A single volume that contains edited versions of the previous two books. This edition notably saw the removal of two chapters that did not have any great connection to the family's life, "Indian Trumpet" and "A Camellia in Winter". Shiina also made additional edits throughout the two novels. Additionally, this edition includes Gakumonogatari and Me (「岳物語」と僕 Gakumonogatari to Boku), an essay by Gaku Watanabe in which the subject of the novel gave his own impressions of his family life, his feelings about being used as a model for his father's work, and the reactions he had encountered from being the son of an author. This marked the first time that Gaku had commented on these things in any significant way.

== Synopsis ==
=== Gaku Stories ===
The narrator, a jack of all trades writer, and his wife, who works at a kindergarten, bring a new son into their household in Kodaira, Tokyo. They give the boy the name Gaku, meaning "mountain peak", due to their shared love of climbing. From his kindergarten days, Gaku displays a great sense of curiosity, which often gets him into trouble, as he uproots the neighbours' sweet potatoes with some friends and engages in other mischief. Living in an area crammed with English language schools and preschools, Gaku's parents struggle to settle on a direction for their son's education, before eventually enrolling him in an elementary school. Gaku enjoys a liberal upbringing, and becomes so popular that during Valentine's Day in his fourth year of school, he receives chocolates from three separate classmates. On the other hand, he enjoys much less success in his studies, picking fights with older students, and becoming a wild problem child who draws the ire of his teachers, leading his parents to be frequently called to the school.

In his fourth year of school, Gaku takes his first trip to Lake Kameyama, where Mr. Noda, a friend of the narrator, lives. After being taught how to fish there, he becomes completely absorbed with the hobby, focusing on it to a degree of concentration that he has never shown to anything before. The narrator playfully asks Gaku to catch him a Japanese catfish from the Tama River, and is shocked when the boy not only looks into how to catch one, but eventually succeeds. In the summer holidays of his fifth year of school, Gaku leaves home to go canoeing down the Kushiro River with Mr. Noda. During his son's absence, the narrator reflects on his own hazy memories of boyhood.

The winter of Gaku's fifth year of school arrives. The narrator, who was away from home the previous New Year due to research for his writing, makes time in his schedule, and plans an overnight fishing trip to Inatori in Higashiizu for Gaku. During this trip, Gaku discusses fishing setups and bait with the owner of the local fishing shop in specialist language that is completely alien to his father. He also uses tools his father has never seen before to skilfully catch a sea ruffe, leading the author to realise that his son is pushing into a world he has no knowledge of. One month later, the narrator, who is by then in the bitterly cold region of Irkutsk, calls home for the first time in a while. As the line crackles and threatens to cut off, he hears that Gaku fell into the ocean while fishing in Kamogawa. This deeply shocks the narrator, and he interrogates Gaku on the details, but Gaku, in sharp contrast to his father's concern, appears quite unfazed by the incident. In a cruel twist of fate, the line is cut due to the poor reception. And resigning himself to not getting any further details, the author replaces the receiver, gives a deep sigh, and bursts into solitary laughter.

=== Zoku Gakumonogatari ===
Returning home from a two-month excursion to Siberia, the narrator finds himself a little directionless. During this period, he attends a party, where a friend, Hitoshi Sawano warns him semi-jokingly that he is too invested in his son's affairs; that children will always break away from their parents eventually, and that if Shiina expects to always see eye to eye with his son, he will be in for a big shock. These words quickly come to pass; by the time Gaku's sixth year of school approaches, he has already far outstripped his father at fishing and canoeing, and has learned to mend tears in his sweat pants and make quick meals like ramen for himself after school. The play wrestling that takes place in the parlour of the Shiina household each night, too, has become so fierce that it's no longer a game, and Gaku has developed to the point where he's able to throw his father with judo techniques.

As time passes, more and more signs appear that Gaku is drifting away from his parents. He becomes infuriated when his parents come to see his final sports day in his sixth year of elementary school without telling him. When the summer holidays come and he goes on a trip down the Tokachi River with his father, Mr. Noda, and some others, he spends more time with Tottan and Mittan, two brothers from his class, than with his father. He also rejects having his hair cut in the bathroom at home, which has been a tradition since his kindergarten days. And over the course of several months, he steadily disposes of many of the various magazines and toys from his childhood days scattered around his room. The narrator views this process of tidying as Gaku "shedding his childhood".

The final winter of Gaku's elementary school days brings further troubles for the narrator. After a brave battle against the illness, Toshio Hoshimi, who served as the leader for the narrator's expedition across Siberia, succumbs to his cancer, and passes away. The narrator is unable to bear the thought of the man's six-year-old daughter crying in front of a father who has becomes nothing but a small pile of bones, and eventually finds himself unable to collect Toshio's bones to have them put them into an urn. He also has to deal with the rumours of murder that surround the disappearance of his high school friend Kishino, a former boxer who participated in the Tokyo Olympics, as well as his mother in law's stroke. During these difficult days, the narrator attempts to recall if he saw his own father's remains after his death in his sixth year of elementary school, but though he clearly recalls the moments before and after the funeral, he doesn't remember any important details. As he takes Gaku to a clothes store to have him measured for his new uniform, he wonders whether his own father was hoping to live long enough to see him in a high school uniform too.

During Gaku's final spring vacation, he plans a one-week excursion to Lake Kameyama with six friends including Tottan and Mittan. He warns the narrator not to come, and he and his friends make a success of the trip all on their own, without even asking Mr. Noda for help. Just before Gaku starts lower high school, the narrator invites Mr. Noda and various other friends to the house and throws a gyōza party for his son. And as the cherry blossoms fall from the trees, the day of Gaku's entrance ceremony arrives. With this, the sweet-natured days of Gaku's boyhood with his father come to an end, and the narrator feels as if his son has begun to take the first steps into his own world.
