= Certain Women =

Certain Women may refer to:

- Certain Women (TV series), a 1970s Australian television series
- Certain Women (film), a 2016 American film

== See also ==
- A Certain Woman, English translation of a Japanese novel by Arishima Takeo published in 1919
- That Certain Woman, a 1937 American drama film
