= Shirakabaha =

Japanese literary coterie

The Shirakaba-ha (白樺派; literally "White Birch Society") was an influential Japanese literary coterie, which published the literary magazine Shirakaba, from 1910 to 1923.

== History ==
In 1910, a loose association of alumni of the prestigious Gakushuin Peer’s School in Tokyo began a literary society. Members included writers, artists, literary critics and others who rejected Confucianism and the strictures of traditional Japanese literary and artistic styles. In particular, the group emphasized idealism, humanism and individualism, over the naturalism that had been the dominant trend in Japanese literature of the Taishō period. The Shirakaba-ha thought highly of Western aesthetics (particularly Expressionism and Post-Impressionism), and considered their mission to spread the ideas of Western art and Western literature into Japan. Unlike many other literary circles, The Shirakaba-ha did not limit their interest to literature, but also delved into other art forms. However, the group remained deeply interested in Japanese culture, particularly in folk art, which had previously been disparaged by traditional art critics.

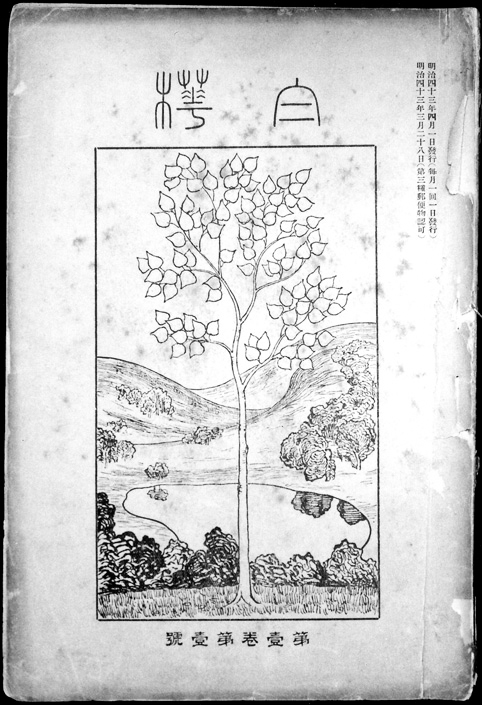
Cover of 1st edition of Shirakaba journal

Early members included Shiga Naoya (1883-1971), Mushanokōji Saneatsu (1885-1976), Yanagi Sōetsu (1889-1961), Satomi Ton (1888-1983), Arishima Takeo (1878-1923) and Nagayo Yoshirō (1888-1961). Their literature was typically of the ‘I novel’ genre, and was concerned with the life of individuals, often incorporating optimistic philosophy into their work. Some of these individuals came with wealthy families, and attempted to emulate Tolstoy in creating utopian agrarian communes in remote parts of Japan. The self-published monthly literary journal Shirakaba ("White Birch") was in circulation from April 1910 until 1923. The magazine reached its peak in popularity in 1918. However, publication was discontinued after the Great Kantō earthquake.
