= Masayuki Mori (actor) =

Japanese actor (1911–1973)

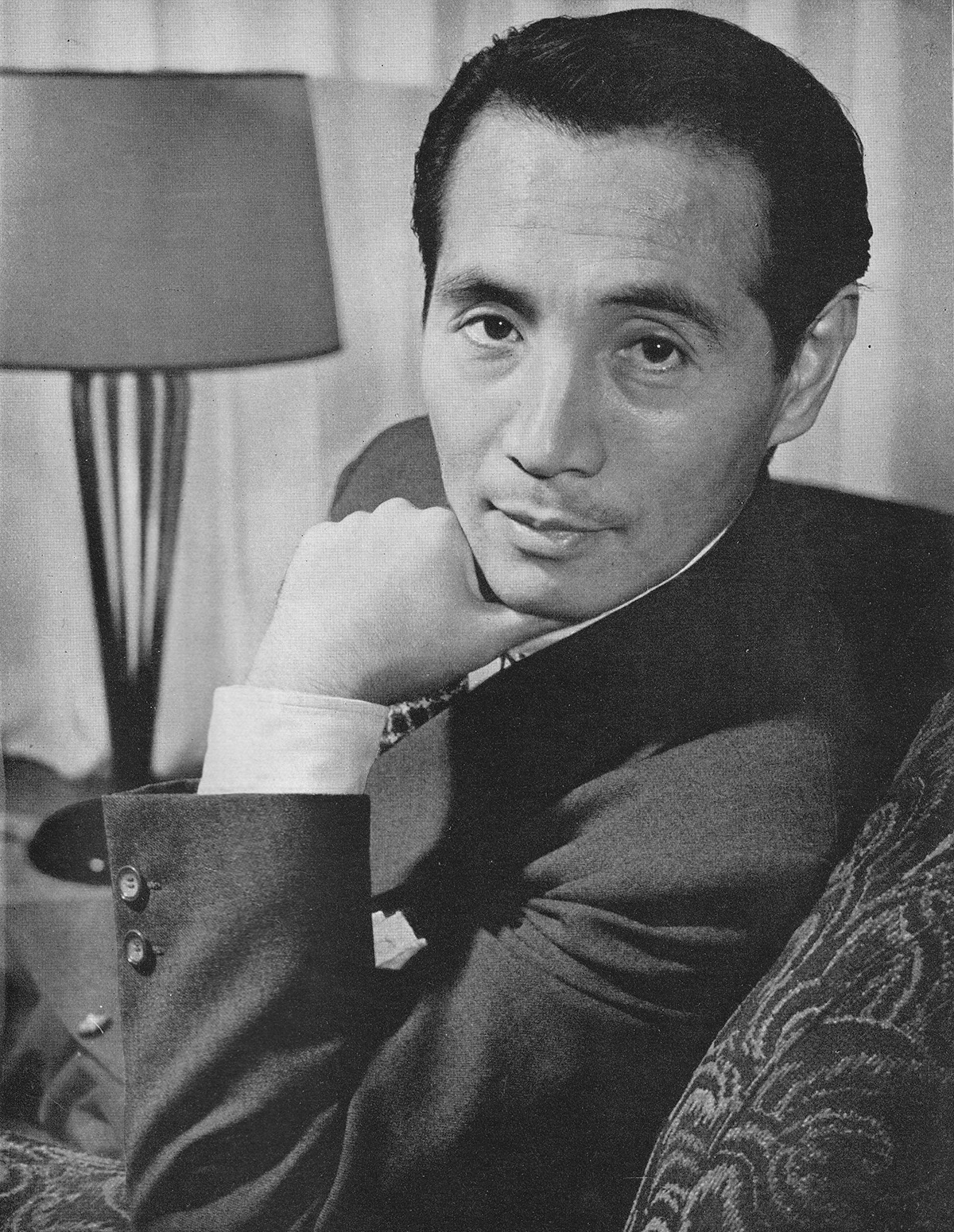
- Born: January 13, 1911; Sapporo, Empire of Japan
- Died: October 7, 1973 (aged 62); Tokyo, Japan
- Occupation: Actor
- Years active: 1931–1973

Masayuki Mori (森 雅之, Mori Masayuki; January 13, 1911 – October 7, 1973) was a Japanese actor and son of novelist Takeo Arishima. Mori appeared in many of Akira Kurosawa's films such as Rashomon, The Idiot and The Bad Sleep Well. He also starred in pictures by Kenji Mizoguchi (Ugetsu), Mikio Naruse (Floating Clouds) and other prominent directors.

== Selected filmography ==
=== Films ===
Year	Title	Role	Director	Notes
1945	The Men Who Tread on the Tiger's Tail	Kamei	Akira Kurosawa	
1945	Sanshiro Sugata Part II	Yoshima Dan	Akira Kurosawa	
1947	A Ball at the Anjo House	Masahiko Anjō	Kōzaburō Yoshimura	
1950	Rashomon	Unnamed samurai	Akira Kurosawa	
1951	The Idiot	Kinji Kameda	Akira Kurosawa	
1951	The Lady of Musashino	Tadao Akiyama	Kenji Mizoguchi	
1953	Ugetsu	Genjūrō	Kenji Mizoguchi	
1953	Older Brother, Younger Sister	Inokichi	Mikio Naruse	
1953	Love Letter	Reikichi Mayumi	Kinuyo Tanaka	
1954	A Certain Woman		Shirō Toyoda	
1955	Floating Clouds	Kengo Tomioka	Mikio Naruse	
1955	Princess Yang Kwei-Fei	Emperor Xuan Zong	Kenji Mizoguchi	
1955	The Heart	Nobuchi	Kon Ichikawa	
1955	The Eternal Breasts	Takashi Hori	Kinuyo Tanaka	
1956	The Balloon	Haruki Murakami	Yuzo Kawashima	
1957	Untamed	Hamaya	Mikio Naruse	
1957	Elegy of the North	Setsuo Katsuragi	Heinosuke Gosho	
1958	Night Drum	Miyaji	Tadashi Imai	
1960	The Bad Sleep Well	Iwabuchi	Akira Kurosawa	
1960	When a Woman Ascends the Stairs	Nobuhiko Fujisaki	Mikio Naruse	
1960	Her Brother	Father	Kon Ichikawa	
1960	Daughters, Wives and a Mother	Yūichirō Sakanishi	Mikio Naruse	
1961	As a Wife, As a Woman	Keijirō Kōno	Mikio Naruse	
1963	Bushido, Samurai Saga	Lord Tambanokami Munemasa Hori	Tadashi Imai	
1963	Alone on the Pacific	Father	Kon Ichikawa	
1968	Admiral Yamamoto	Fumimaro Konoe	Seiji Maruyama	
1970	Zatoichi Goes to the Fire Festival	The Dark Lord	Kenji Misumi	

=== Television ===
Year	Title	Role	Network	Notes
1962	Takasebune	Shōbei	NTV	
1968	Ryōma ga Yuku	Yoshida Tōyō	NHK	Taiga drama
1970	Mominoki wa Nokotta	Date Aki	NHK	Taiga drama
1972	Shin Heike Monogatari	Fujiwara no Tadazane	NHK	Taiga drama
