= Futon (novel) =

1907 novel by Katai Tayama

- 1981 edition
- Author: Katai Tayama
- Language: Japanese
- Genre: I-Novel
- Publisher: Shinshosetsu Journal
- Publication date: 1907
- Publication place: Japan

Futon (蒲団, also translated "The Quilt") is a 1907 Japanese novel written by Katai Tayama, originally published in Shinshosetsu (新小説, translated "New novel") magazine. It is considered to be the first Japanese I-novel, a genre of semi-autobiographical confessional literature.

== Plot ==
Futon recounts the memories of Tokio Takenaka, a 34-year-old novelist in a loveless marriage, who hates his day job and finds nothing in life interesting besides fantasizing about younger women. One day, he receives a letter from Yoshiko Yokoyama, a young female student and admirer, asking to become Tokio's disciple. Hesitant at first, after exchanging multiple letters with the girl, he agrees to take her as his student, and Yoshiko moves to Tokyo. Tokio begins to fall in love with Yoshiko, but does not confess his feelings towards her due to his fear of societal consequences.

Yoshiko starts dating a man, and Tokio decides to have her stay on the second floor to keep an eye on her. Tokio contacts Yoshiko's parents to inform them of the relationship. Upon learning the couple had sex, Tokio contacts her father in anger and jealousy, who calls her home. Tokio returns to his old life, and out of loneliness, buries his face in Yoshiko's futon and cries.

== Writing ==
Unlike many I-novels, Futon is written in the third person. It is based on the relationship of the author with his pupil Michiyo Okada. It is regarded as the first I-novel and the model for future books in the genre, which would be based on the authors' lives.

The novel was considered sensational at the time of publication, due to its exaggeration of desire and sexuality, specifically in the narrator's final actions of smelling the futon of his female student.
