= A Certain Woman =

Book by Takeo Arishima

- cover illustration for Shinchosha reprint
- Author: Arishima Takeo
- Original title: Aru Onna
- Translator: Kenneth Strong
- Language: Japanese
- Published: 1919 (University of Tokyo Press) (Japanese); 1978 (English)
- Publication place: Japan
- ISBN: 0860082377

A Certain Woman (或る女, Aru Onna) is the English translation of the name a Japanese novel by Arishima Takeo published in 1919. The first half of the novel first appeared in serialized form in the literary magazine Shirakaba , starting from January 1911 and running for 16 episodes to March 1913. The second half of the novel was not published until 1919, when both volumes were issued as a set.

The novel is partly biographical, with Arishima modeling the protagonist, Yōko, after Kunikida Doppo's ex-wife, Nobuko Sasaki. The main theme of the novel is the changing place of women in Japanese society at the end of the Meiji period and Taishō period.

== Plot ==
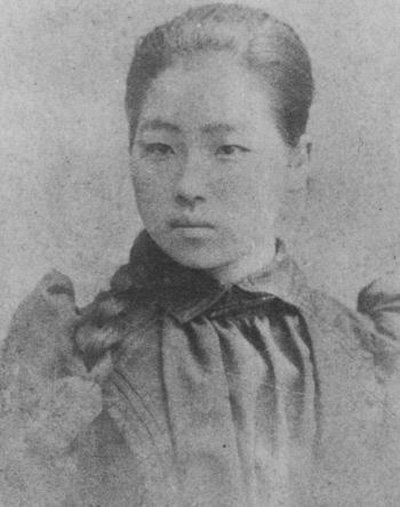
Sasaki Nobuko (20 July 1878 – 22 September 1949), the model for Yōko Satsuki.

Yōko Satsuki, oldest of three sisters raised by a "progressive" mother at the start of the twentieth century, is strong-willed but capricious. She falls in love with a journalist (Kibe), and marries him in a "love match", when arranged marriages were still the norm. However, Yōko is very quickly bored with the journalist, and suddenly decides to divorce him and return to her parents' house. The journalist is devastated by the brief marriage and divorce, but Yōko feels only contempt for him, and (in the opening of the story), when she sees him on a train, she completely ignores his existence.

After her parents' death, and following pressure from her relatives and friends, Yōko agrees to marry a friend of a friend (Kimura) who has settled in Chicago in the United States. However, on the steamer from Yokohama, Yōko has an affair with a married purser (Kuraji), oblivious to the disapproving eyes of the other passengers. By the time she reaches the United States, Yōko decides not to marry Kimura. After taking money from the hapless Kimura, Yōko returns to Japan together with Kuraji. Yōko and Kuraji start living together, despite the fact that Kuraji remains married to someone else, and Yōko has to look after her younger sisters. However, Yōko fails to find happiness, as she struggles financially and bickers constantly with Kuraji. Kuraji proves unreliable, and eventually disappears with a police arrest warrant over his head.

The novel ends on a dark note; first Yōko's younger sister falls ill and dies, and then Yōko dies as well, worn out by her constant struggle to escape conventional society and morality. Although she only wanted to live her life as an individual not bound by the constrictions imposed by others, Japan at the start of the twentieth century was not the right place or time for such freedom.

== Film, TV and other adaptations ==
A Certain Woman was made into a movie by Shochiku Studios in October 1942, directed by Minoru Shibuya, and starring Kinuyo Tanaka in the role of Yōko (who is named Oshige in the film version).

The cinematic version of A Certain Woman was re-issued by Daiei on March 13, 1954. Directed by Shirō Toyoda and starring Machiko Kyō in the role of Yōko, Masayuki Mori, who was the son of the author Arishima Takeo, played the role of the journalist, and Eiji Funakoshi played the role of Kimura.

A Certain Woman has also been adapted for television twice. The first time was a mini-series by Nippon Television which ran from February 2, 1962, to March 9, 1962, and the second time was on Fuji Television, which ran from November 2, 1964, to November 30, 1964.

== International titles ==
- A Certain Woman, transl. by Kenneth Strong, University of Tokyo Press, 1978, 382 pages, ISBN 0-86008-237-7.
- Жінка ('The Woman'), transl. by Ivan Chyrko, Dnipro Publishing, 1978. (Ukrainian)
- Les jours de Yoko, transl. by M. Yoshitomi and Albert Maybon P. Picquier, 1998. (French)
- Yoko : roman, transl. by Alla Verbetchi - Arania, 1992. (Romanian)
- Cierta mujer, transl. by Naoko Narushima and Pedro Pablo Ontoria, with a foreword by Carlos Rubio, Satori Ediciones, 2021, ISBN 978-84-17419-81-3. (Spanish)
