= Ogata Kōan =

Japanese physician

Ogata Kōan 緒方 洪庵
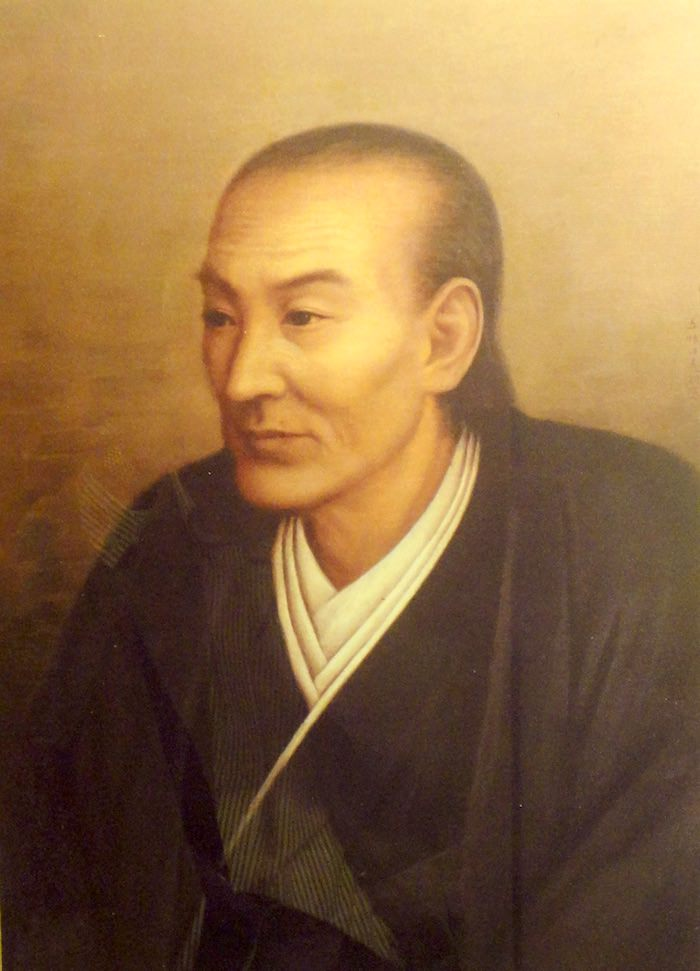
- Ogata Kōan circa 1850
- Born: Ogata Koreaki; August 13, 1810; Ashimori Domain, (Okayama) Japan
- Died: July 25, 1863 (aged 52); Edo, Japan
- Occupations: doctor, rangaku scholar

Ogata Kōan (緒方 洪庵; August 13, 1810 – July 25, 1863) was a Japanese medical doctor and rangaku scholar in late Edo period Japan, noted for establishing an academy which later developed into Osaka University. Many of his students subsequently played important roles in the Meiji Restoration and the westernization of Japan in the Meiji period. His true name was Ogata Koreaki (緒方 惟章) or Ogata Akira (緒方 章); the name of Kōan was his courtesy name.

== Biography ==
Ogata was born in 1810 to a family of low-ranking samurai of Ashimori Domain in Bitchū Province in what is now part of the city of Okayama. He moved to Osaka in 1825 with his father, and began studies in rangaku and medicine at a private academy run by Naka Tenyū from 1826. In 1831, he relocated to Edo to continue his studies in western medicine, returning to Nagasaki in 1836 to study under the Dutch doctor Erdewin Johannes Niemann, despite the Tokugawa shogunate's strict national isolation policy.

In 1838, Ogata returned to Osaka to establish his medical practice, and in the same year established the Tekijuku, an academy of rangaku studies, where he taught medicine, natural history, chemistry and physics for the next 24 years. Ogata used his small but precious collection of Dutch books, including a Dutch-Japanese dictionary and a Dutch encyclopedia, to teach his pupils to read scientific Dutch texts. He also wrote several books, including a treatise entitled How to treat cholera, which he compiled in haste from various European sources during the great cholera epidemic of 1858.

From December 1849, he struggled to gain acceptance of the new smallpox vaccination, eventually opening 186 vaccination centers from Edo to Kyushu, and obtaining official recognition of the method in 1858. In 1862, Ogata was appointed personal physician to shōgun Tokugawa Iemochi, who supported the introduction of western medicine and the establishment of a western medicine research institute in Edo. However, Ogata died a few months later in July 1863 of acute hemoptysis, caused by the tuberculosis he had suffered from for many years.

His house still exists in downtown Osaka. Built in a conventional eighteenth-century style, the students left their mark on the central post of the second-floor classroom, slashing and hacking it with their swords.

== Famous alumni ==
Alumni of the Tekijuku include Fukuzawa Yukichi, Ōmura Masujirō, Ōtori Keisuke, Takeda Ayasaburō, Nagayo Sensai, Sana Tsunetami and the manga artist Tezuka Osamu's ancestor Tezuka Ryōan.

== Books ==
Ogata was the author of Byōgakutsūron (病学通論), which was the first book on pathology to be published in Japan.

== In popular culture ==
Ogata Kōan is an important character in the first season of the 2009–2011 TV series Jin. He was portrayed by actor Tetsuya Takeda.
