= I-novel =

Literary genre in Japanese literature

The I-novel (私小説, Shishōsetsu, Watakushi Shōsetsu) is a literary genre in Japanese literature used to describe a type of confessional literature where the events in the story correspond to events in the author's life. This genre was founded based on the Japanese reception of naturalism during the Meiji period, and later influenced literature in other Asian countries as well. This genre of literature reflects greater individuality and a less constrained method of writing. From its beginnings, the I-novel has been a genre that is also meant to expose aspects of society or of the author's life.

== History ==
=== Origin ===
The first I-novels are believed to be The Broken Commandment, written in 1906 by Tōson Shimazaki, and Futon (The Quilt) written by Katai Tayama in 1907. In Futon, the protagonist confesses his affection for a female pupil. In The Broken Commandment, Shimazaki described a man who was born a member of a discriminated segment of the population (burakumin), and how he decided to violate his father's commandment not to reveal his community of birth.

=== Social background ===
In the mid-1800s, European powers and the US forced the Tokugawa shogunate to end its policy of isolation. Japan faced great external pressure which pushed it towards political and cultural renewal. After the Meiji restoration between the 1860s and mid-1880s, there were enormous amounts of intellectual exchange between Japanese and Western powers, including the translation of books on politics, philosophy, and science into Japanese. The new government encouraged these kinds of activities in order to inform and educate its people.

Shoyo Tsubouchi was one of the scholars and writers who worked to introduce Western ideas into Japan. He claimed the intrinsic value of fiction as an artistic genre, which provided insight into people's psychological aspects. He strongly opposed the literature style of the Edo period which was weak in depicting the emotions of characters. He believed that fiction should be self-relevant and his thoughts led to major innovations.

Later, in order to withstand the political and military challenge posed by Western powers, Meiji government proposed the slogan "rich nation and strong army", which led to a centralization of power. Young scholars in the Meiji period were not satisfied with such a policy and turned to Western literature and philosophy, from which they began to re-evaluate fiction. Another notable scholar who played an important role in this process was Fukuzawa Yukichi. He believed that people were born equal. He also emphasized the importance of individual self-respect, as well as national independence and freedom. This idea of individualism was later supported enthusiastically by Meiji scholars.

In 1889, the Meiji Constitution was established, which emphasized the absolute and divine power of the emperor, and the notion of "kokutai (nation body)". Japan entered a period of nationalism. Young scholars who believed in individualism and liberty were disappointed by these militaristic and nationalist politics and turned to "the path that leads inwards". The literary climate during this period was dominated by Romanticism, neo-idealism and individualism.

== Definition ==
=== Language style ===
The Japanese language contains a number of different words for "I"; mostly, the formal watashi (私) is used in the I-novel. Other words "I" such as Boku and Jibun may also be seen in some works. There are also some instances where the author uses third-person pronouns or a named main character (such as Yozo in No Longer Human ) to present the stories as the experience of others or as fictional. The title of the genre (Watakushi Shōsetsu) includes the more formal pronoun Watakushi.

=== Framework ===
There are several general rules for the creation of an I-novel: The first and most important one is that the I-novel is often written from the first-person perspective (which is where the "I" of I-novel comes from). The I-novel is categorized as "reality", and the most important framework is "jijitsu (reality)", or "makoto (sincerity)". This framework restricts the narrative to "the life experienced by the author", and fiction will make the work no longer considered as real or sincere.

"Reality" in the I-novel is defined by 3 aspects. The first is a one-to-one relationship between the author's experience and the story in the novel, though slight differences are acceptable. The second is "inner reality". Rather than reflecting accurate facts, the I-novel emphasizes more on the actual spiritual condition of the author. The third is from the reader's perspective. An I-novel should appear natural and unplanned to its readers.

=== Difference from autobiography ===
Autobiographies usually present a comprehensive life story of the author, while I-Novels are more personal and emotional, focusing on greater depth and the feeling of a particular experience happening to the author. An I-novel is a semi-autobiographical work where the boundary between author and narrator is blurred, and the reader is meant to consider the narrator and author as one and the same.

== Authors and works ==
Examples of the I-novel are listed below:

- Iwano Homei "Tandeki"
- Chikamatsu Shuko "Giwaku"
- Shiga Naoya "Wakai"
- Kasai Zenzo "Ko o tsurete"
- Kikuchi Kan "Tomo to tomo no aida"
- Hayashi Fumiko "Horoki"
- Miura Tetsuo "Shinobugawa"
- Dazai Osamu "Ningen shikkaku"
- Tōson Shimazaki "The Broken Commandment"
- Tayama Katai "Futon"

== I-novel in China ==
The influence of the I-novel in China started with the self-referential fiction of Creation Society. The I-novel had a brief ascendancy in China during the May Fourth period. Despite the increasing scarcity of these kinds of narratives during the 1930s, its popularity among writers was not completely eradicated. In the 1940s, many self-referential works written by woman writers such as Xiao Hong and Ding Ling were published. In addition, the author Yu Dafu continued to produce various self-referential works until he died in 1945. This trend set the foundation for more self-referential works in 1980s.

Members of Creation Society at first learned from Western literature, then shifted to the Japanese I-novel, since they were dissatisfied with the existing modes of expression and desired to develop a new mode of narrative which was more consistent with their ideals of modern literary expression. Recently, Chinese critics have argued that limited exposure to Western culture led May Fourth writers to eventually transition to the Japanese I-novel with which they had direct contact.

== See also ==
- Autofiction
- Gaku Stories – I-novel by Makoto Shiina
- Roman à clef
