= Yoshirō Nagayo =

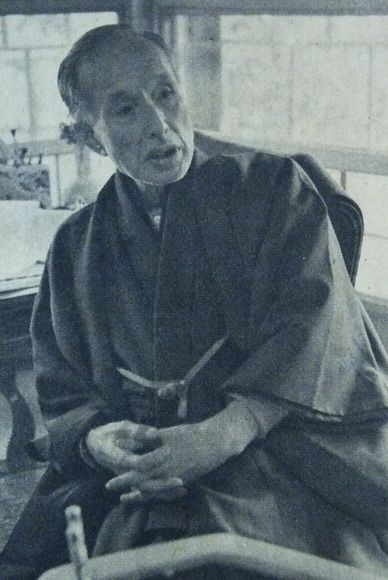
- Nagayo in 1955
- Born: August 6, 1888; Tokyo, Japan
- Died: October 29, 1961 (aged 73); Tokyo, Japan
- Occupation: Writer
- Writing career
- Genres: novels and stage plays
- Notable work: Seido no Kirisuto
- Literary movement: Shirakaba

Yoshirō Nagayo (長与 善郎, Nagayo Yoshirō; August 6, 1888 – October 29, 1961) was a novelist and playwright active during the Shōwa period in Japan.

== Biography ==
Nagayo was born in Tokyo, the fifth son of the famous doctor, Nagayo Sensai. He attended the Gakushūin Peers' School, and went on to graduate from Tokyo Imperial University. Through his school connections, he made the acquaintance of Mushanokoji Saneatsu and Shiga Naoya, and he contributed works to the Shirakaba ("White Birch") literary journal. He is considered a typical spokesman for the humanistic philosophy of the Shirakaba school.

Publication of Shirakaba was suspended in 1923 after the Great Kantō earthquake, but Nagayo and Mushanokoji collaborated to bring out a new literary magazine, Fuji, the same year. As a literary critic for Fuji, Nagayo railed against the proletarian literature movement of the pre-war period.

His major works include the plays Kou to Ryuho (1916–1917), Indara no ko ("Child of Indra", 1921), and the historical novel Takezawa sensei to iu hito (1924–25).

He is best known in the West for his screenplay Seido no Kirisuto ("Christ in Bronze"), a story about religious persecution in Edo period Japan, which was one of the entries in competition at the 1956 Cannes Film Festival.

== See also ==
- Japanese literature
- List of Japanese authors
