= Hōmei Iwano =

Japanese writer and playwright (1873–1920)

- Born: January 20, 1873; Hyōgo Prefecture, Japan
- Died: May 9, 1920 (aged 47)
- Occupations: Writer and translator

Hōmei Iwano (岩野 泡鳴, Iwano Hōmei; January 20, 1873 – May 9, 1920) was a Japanese poet, literary critic, novelist and playwright associated with the Japanese naturalist movement. He first gained attention through poetry and literary criticism before turning toward autobiographical fiction in the early twentieth century, particularly through works such as Tandeki (1909) and Hōmei gobusaku (1911).

== Early life ==
Born as Yoshie (美衛) Iwano in Sumoto, Hyogo Prefecture, he came from a family that had long served the Hachisuka clan of the former Awa Domain. After the family moved to Sumoto (1871) in the aftermath of the Inada Rebellion, Iwano reportedly experienced persecution from local children during his school years, an experience that later influenced the strongly individualistic character of his literature. Originally intending to become a Christian missionary, he was baptized in Osaka in 1887 and later studied Meiji Gakuin, Senshu Gakko and Sendai Seminary, though he left his studies unfinished.

== Literary career ==
After several successful poetry collections and kabuki dramas, he began to attract through poetical dramas and literary criticism, including Shintaishi no sahō (1907), Shintaishi shi (1907–08), Shinpiteki hanjū shugi (1906), Shin shizen shugi (1908). In these works he promoted the idea of a "new naturalism" and openly criticized both established naturalist writers such as Shimazaki Tōson and Tayama Katai and the anti-naturalist circle around Natsume Sōseki.

From 1909 onward, he published autobiographical novels such as Tandeki (Indulgence, 1909) and Hōomei gobusaku (1911), which established his reputation as a writer. Around this period he also attempted unseccessfully to start crab-canning business in Karafuto (Sakhalin); the experience later inspired parts of his fiction. His turbulent private life, including multiple marriages and his relationship with women's rights activist Kiyoko Endō, frequently attracted public attention.

== Relation to the shishōsetsu tradition ==
Iwano's work can also be understood in the broader context of the Japanese Shishōsetsu ("I-novel") tradition, a literary form strongly associated with autobiographical confession and the blending of author narrator. According to modern scholarship, Japanese critics often treated such works less as fiction than as the "true text" behind the narrative. This literary environment helps explain why Iwano's intensely personal and seld-revealing fiction attracted so much attention in the Taishō period.

Scholars further note that Japanese naturalist and autobiographical literature differed from Western realism in its relative lack of plot-driven narrative structure, focusing instead on subjective experience, emotional states and the direct transcription of lived reality. Iwano's fiction exemplified this tendency through its confessional tone, emphasis on personal turmoil and rejection of heavily constructed narrative design.

== Later life ==
Besides fiction and criticism, Iwano published five collections of poetry between 1901 and 1915 and translated works by Plutarch and Arthur Symons. His essays such as modern Thought and Real Life (1913) and Anatomy of Modern Life (1915), influenced later Japanese writers and critics including Hideo Kobayashi and Chūya Nakahara. He died on May 9, 1920, from a perforated colon.

== Sources ==
- Louis Frédéric : Japan Encyclopedia. Harvard University Press, 2002 (Japon, dictionnaire et civilisation), ISBN 0-674-00770-0, p. 409
