= Kenneth Strong (translator) =

British academic and translator (1925–1990)

Kenneth Lionel Chatterton Strong
- Born: 27 June 1925; London, England
- Died: 7 December 1990 (aged 65)

Academic background
- Education: Oxford University; SOAS University of London

Academic work
- Discipline: Japanese
- Institutions: Tokyo Woman's Christian University; University of Sydney; SOAS University of London

Kenneth Lionel Chatterton Strong (27 June 1925 – 7 December 1990) was a British scholar and translator of Japanese novels.

== Biography ==
Strong was educated at Oxford University and SOAS University of London. He received a BA in Classics in 1947 and a MA in 1957 from the former institution and a BA in Japanese in 1951 and a BA in English in 1957 from the latter.

Strong served in the Royal Navy and arrived in Japan in 1946 as part of Allied forces. He was assistant professor at Tokyo Woman's Christian University between 1959 and 1962 and lecturer at University of Sydney between 1963 and 1964. Strong returned to England in 1964 and worked as a lecturer in Japanese at SOAS University of London from 1964 to 1980. During this time he published several praised translations of notable Japanese novels.

Strong married in 1953 and had a daughter and a son.

== Bibliography ==
- Ox against the storm : a biography of Tanaka Shozo - Japan's conservationist pioneer (Paul Norbury Publications, 1977) about Shōzō Tanaka

== Translations ==
- Kitamura Tokoku, "Shukkonkyō", or The Magic Mirror (Monumenta Nipponica, vol 21, No. 3/4, 1966)
- Fumio Niwa, The Buddha Tree : a novel (Tuttle, 1968)
- Kenjiro Tokutomi, Footprints in the Snow (Tuttle, 1971)
- Kinoshita Naoe, Pillar of Fire : Hi no hashira (Allen and Unwin, 1972)
- Toson Shimazaki, The Broken Commandment (University of Tokyo Press, 1974)
- Takeo Arishima, A Certain Woman (University of Tokyo Press, 1978)
