= Fujin Gahō =

Japanese women's magazine

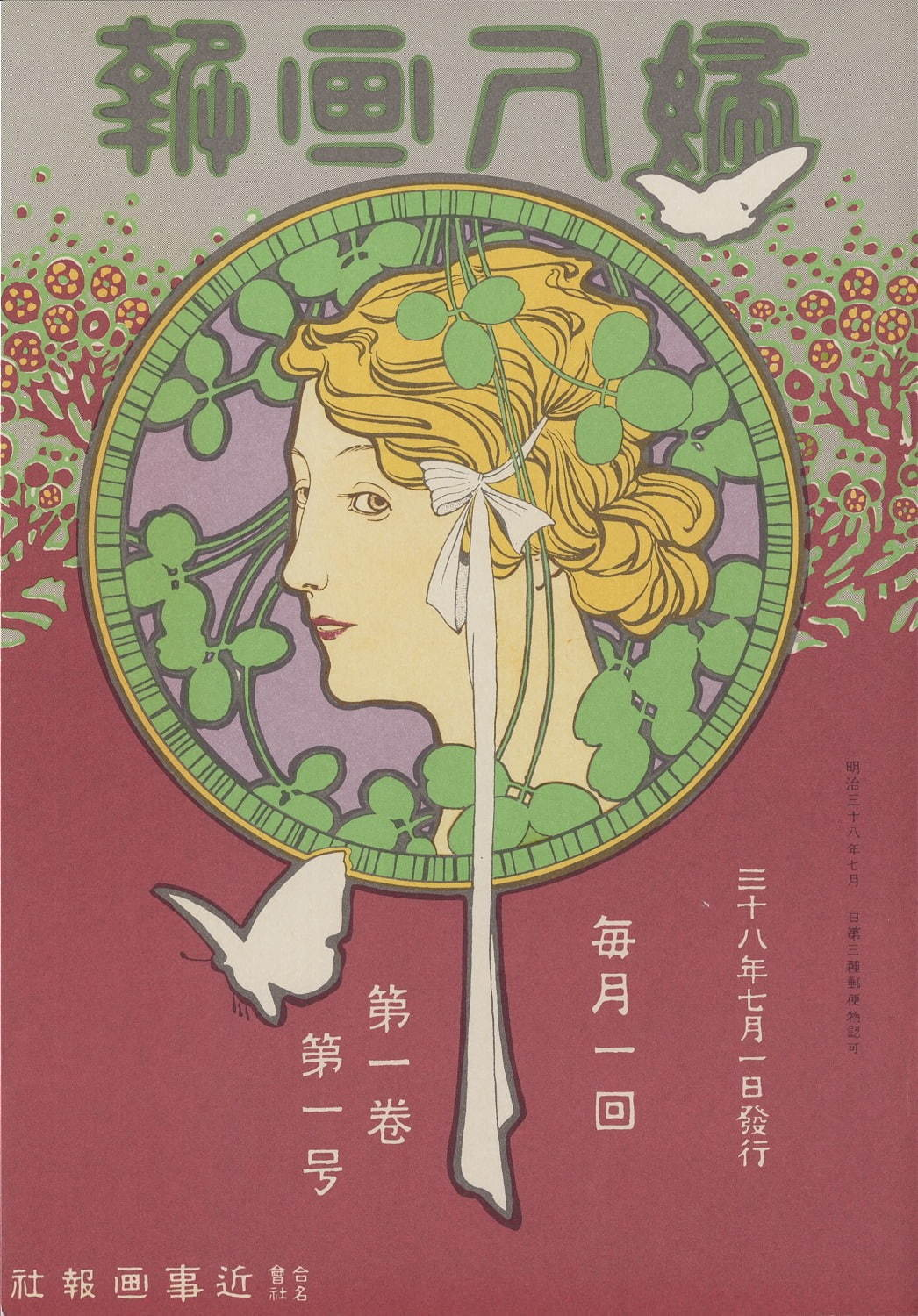
- Cover page of the first issue
- Former editors: Tetsuzō Tanikawa
- Categories: Women's magazine
- Frequency: Monthly
- Publisher: Fujin Gaho co.
- Founder: Doppo Kunikida
- Founded: 1905
- First issue: July 1905
- Company: Hearst Corporation
- Country: Japan
- Based in: Tokyo
- Language: Japanese

Fujin Gahō (婦人画報; Illustrated Women's Gazette) is a Japanese language monthly women's magazine in Japan. Founded in 1905, it is one of the oldest magazines in the country.

== History and profile ==
Fujin Gahō was established in 1905. The founder was a Japanese novelist, Doppo Kunikida, and the founding publisher was Tokyosha. The first issue appeared in July 1905. Later it began to be published by Fujin Gahosha, which is still the publisher. During World War II the magazine was temporarily closed down, and in 1946 it was restarted.

One of the previous owners of Fujin Gahō was a French media group, Hachette Filipacchi Médias. The company acquired the publisher of the magazine, Fujin Gaho co., in 1998. The publisher is Fujin Gaho co., a Hearst Corporation subsidiary. It is published on a monthly basis. The magazine targets women over 40, who are wealthy, leisured upper-class housewife and who are married. It covers high fashion trends from Japan and other countries.

Tetsuzō Tanikawa is one of the former chief editors of Fujin Gahō.

In 2012 the circulation of Fujin Gahō was 79,117 copies.
