= Nagayo Sensai =

Japanese politician

Baron Nagayo Sensai
- 長與 專齋
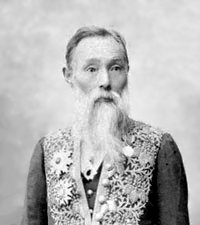

Member of the House of Peers
- In office 30 September 1890 – 10 September 1902 Nominated by the Emperor

Member of the Genrōin
- In office 27 April 1886 – 20 October 1890

Personal details
- Born: 16 October 1838 Ōmura, Hizen, Japan
- Died: 8 September 1902 (aged 63) Tokyo, Japan
- Resting place: Aoyama Cemetery
- Children: Yoshirō Nagayo
- Education: Tekijuku
- Occupation: Medical doctor, politician

Baron Nagayo Sensai (長与 専斎; 16 October 1838 – 8 September 1902) was a medical doctor, educator and statesman in Meiji period Japan.

== Biography ==
Nagayo was born to a family of traditional physicians in Ōmura Domain, Hizen Province (present day Ōmura Nagasaki Prefecture). After studies at the Gokōkan domain academy he studied rangaku under Ogata Kōan in Osaka, and returned to Ōmura afterwards to accept an official position with the domain and rank of samurai.

With the establishment of the Nagasaki Naval Training Center and Dutch military advisors in Nagasaki in 1860, Nagayo assisted Matsumoto Jun and Dutch physician J. L. C. Pompe van Meerdervoort in establishing a medical training college which combined eastern and western medical practices. Nagayo continued to work with Pompe van Meerdervoot’s successors, Antonio Bauduin and Constant George van Mansveldt, through 1868. The medical training college and its associated hospital is now part of Nagasaki University.

After the Meiji Restoration, in 1871 Nagayo was selected to accompany the Iwakura Mission on its around-the-world journey to the United States and Europe. He was especially impressed from what he saw of modern medical practices in Germany and the Netherlands during his visit. On his return to Japan in 1873, he established the modern Japanese medical establishment with the creation the Medical Affairs Bureau (the predecessor of the Ministry of Health, Labour and Welfare), initially under the Ministry of Education, and later under the Home Ministry. He also promulgated the Vaccination Law, the comprehensive Medical Law, and established to Tokyo Igakkō, which later became the medical facility of Tokyo Imperial University.

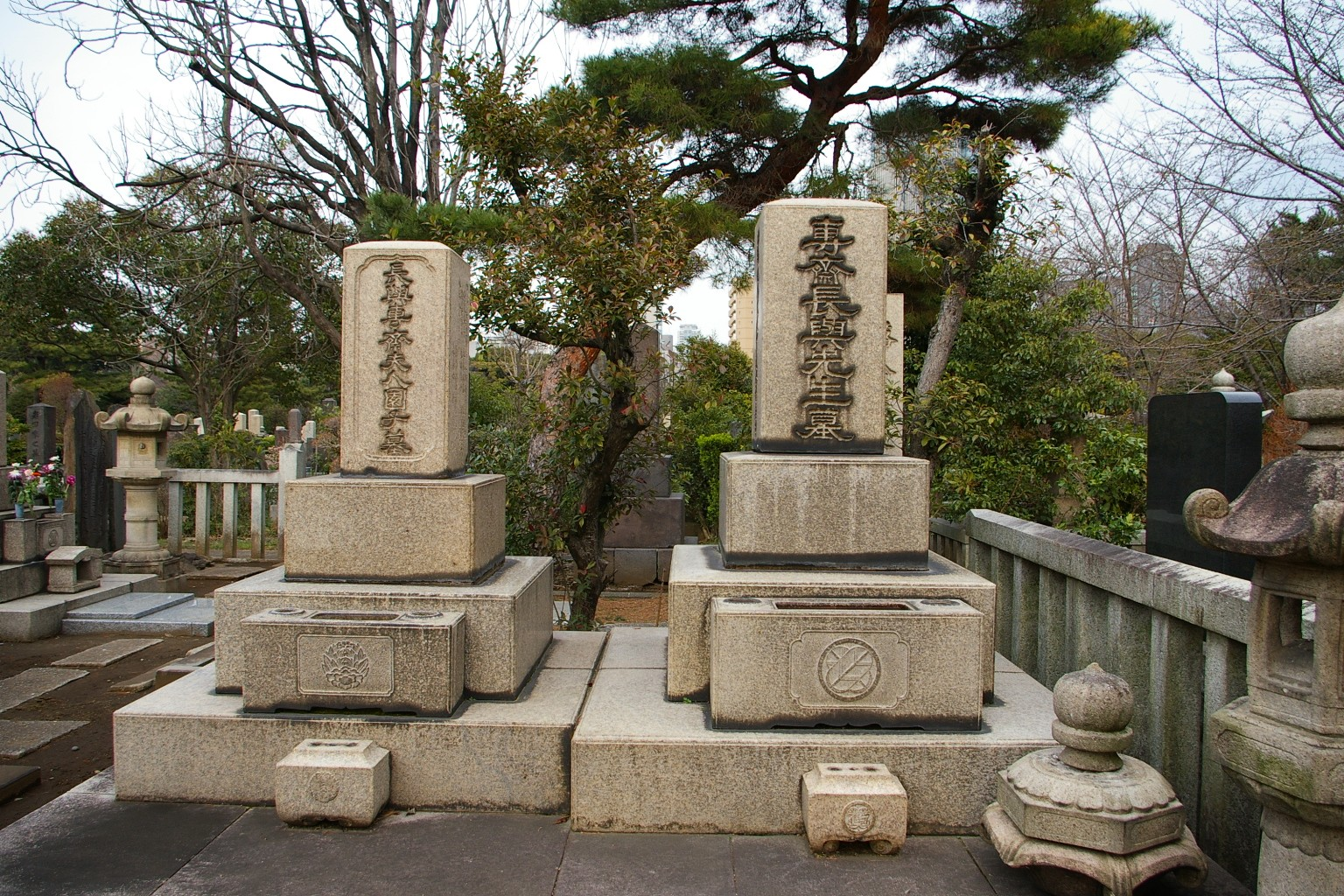
専斎長與先生墓 Grave of Nagayo Sensai

After his retirement from medicine in 1891, Nagayo served on the Genrōin and became an appointed member House of Peers in the Diet of Japan. He was ennobled with the rank of danshaku (baron) in the kazoku peerage system.

Nagayo also established a hospital for tuberculosis patients in Yuigahama, Kamakura, and publicized the benefits of Kamakura as a health resort for its clean sea air. He died in 1902, and his grave is at the Aoyama Cemetery in Tokyo.

== References and further reading ==
- Ban, Tadayasu. Tekijuku to Nagayo Sensai: Eiseigaku to Shoko shishi. Sogensha 1987. ISBN 4-422-21009-2 (Japanese)
- Hardacre, Helen. New directions in the study of Meiji Japan. Brill. ISBN 9004107355
- Rogaski, Ruth. Hygienic Modernity: Meanings of Health and Disease in Treaty-Port China. University of California Press. (2004). ISBN 0520930606
