= Kameyama Dam =

Dam in Chiba Prefecture, Japan

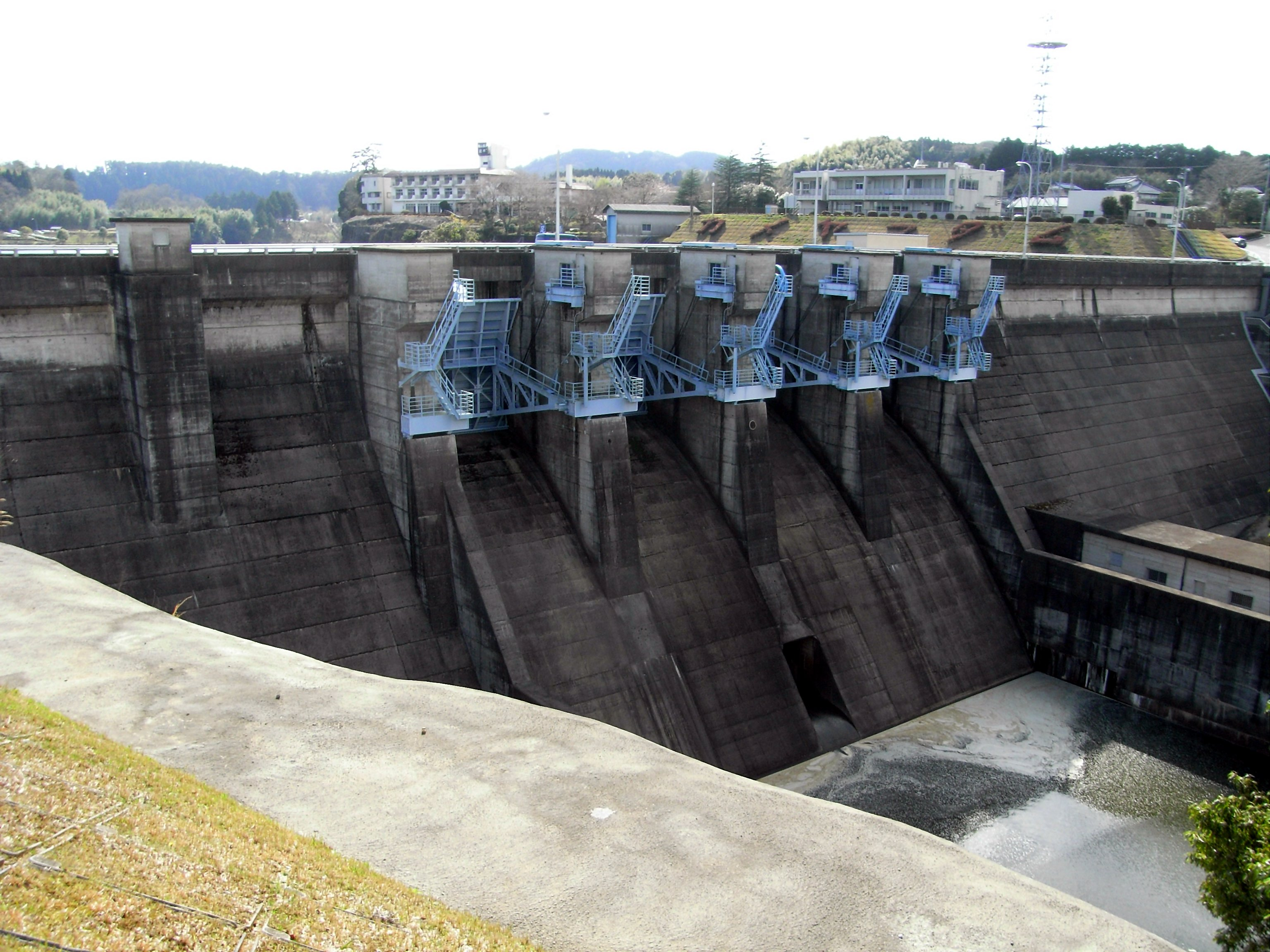

- Location within Japan
- Interactive map of Kameyama Dam
- Location: Chiba Prefecture, Japan
- Coordinates: 35°13′48″N 140°5′08″E
- Construction began: 1969
- Opening date: 1980

Dam and spillways
- Height: 34.5 m (113 ft)
- Length: 156 m (512 ft)

Reservoir
- Total capacity: 14750 thousand cubic meters
- Catchment area: 69.7 sq. km
- Surface area: 139 hectares

Kameyama Dam is a gravity dam located in Chiba Prefecture in Japan. The dam is used for flood control and water supply. The catchment area of the dam is 69.7 km^{2}. The dam impounds about 139 ha of land when full and can store 14750 thousand cubic meters of water. The construction of the dam was started on 1969 and completed in 1980.
