= The Broken Commandment =

Novel by Tōson Shimazaki

- First English edition
- Author: Tōson Shimazaki
- Original title: Hakai
- Translator: Kenneth Strong
- Language: Japanese
- Genre: Novel
- Publisher: University of Tokyo Press
- Publication date: 1906
- Publication place: Japan
- English publication date: 1974
- Media type: Print (hardback & paperback)
- Pages: 249
- ISBN: 0-86008-191-5
- OCLC: 9898713

The Broken Commandment is a Japanese novel written by Tōson Shimazaki published in 1906 (late Meiji period) under the title Hakai (破戒). The novel deals with the burakumin (部落民, 'village people'), formerly known as eta. This book enjoyed great popularity and influence in Japan.

== Plot ==
The basic plot concerns a school teacher named Ushimatsu Segawa (family name written last) who struggles with a commandment given to him by his late father. He is never to reveal his burakumin background, which his father had tried so hard to conceal as well. Ushimatsu idolizes Rentarou Inoko, a burakumin rights' activist and successful writer (particularly considering the social position given to those considered burakumin). Ushimatsu wishes to reveal his background to Rentarou, as his need to hide away part of himself in order to be accepted by society in general leads to his feeling constricted by this superficial identity, and to his desiring to form a more meaningful connection with Rentarou through their common experience.

This novel also touches on the dangerous, destructive nature of gossip, and questions society's inability to accept what is not understood. It attempts to build understanding and empathy for this group of people at a time (the novel's publication's) when a great deal of prejudice still existed towards this group.

== Writing ==
Toson's The Broken Commandment was completed under impecunious circumstances. After the idea of the novel was formulated, Toson approached his father-in-law, Hata Keiji, and a wealthy landlord, Kozu Takeshi, asking for their support in his full-time writing of the novel. They agreed, and Toson quit his job as a teacher. With his pregnant wife and three daughters Toson left Komoro and moved to Minami Toshima-gun in Tokyo to complete his work. His three daughters died one after another, from meningitis and intestinal catarrh, and Toson came to regard their deaths as "sacrifices" − their deaths were most likely triggered by malnutrition which deprived them from "maintaining adequate physical resistance to the fatal diseases because of the tightly budgeted life Toson subjected his family to".

== Film adaptations ==
The Broken Commandment has been repeatedly adapted into films:

- 1946: Hakai, dir. Yutaka Abe
- 1948: Apostasy, dir. Keisuke Kinoshita
- 1962: The Outcast, dir. Kon Ichikawa
- 2022: Hakai, dir. Kazuo Maeda

== Bibliography ==
- Title: The broken commandment, Japan Foundation translation series, Kokusai Kōryū Kikin, UNESCO collection of representative works: Japanese series
- Author: Tōson Shimazaki
- Editor: Tōson Shimazaki
- Translated: Kenneth Strong
- Collaborator: Kenneth Strong
- Edition: reprinted
- Editor: University of Tokyo Press, 1974
- ISBN 0860081915, 9780860081913
- 249 pages
