= Tekijuku =

Defunct higher education institute in Osaka, Japan

Coordinates: 34°41′28.5″N 135°30′11.7″E

Tekijuku (Japanese: 適塾) was a private school (Japanese: ja:私塾, Hepburn: shijuku) of Dutch studies (Rangaku) in Osaka, Japan. Ogata Kōan, a doctor and scholar of Rangaku, established it in 1838 during the Tenpō era of the late Edo period. Its official name was Tekitekisaijuku (適々斎塾), named after one of Ogata's art names, Tekitekisai (適々斎). It was located in Osaka's traditional merchant neighborhood of Semba (船場) on the main trading route between Nagasaki and Edo.

The foreign language curriculum focused primarily on medicine, but also taught astronomy and other western sciences.

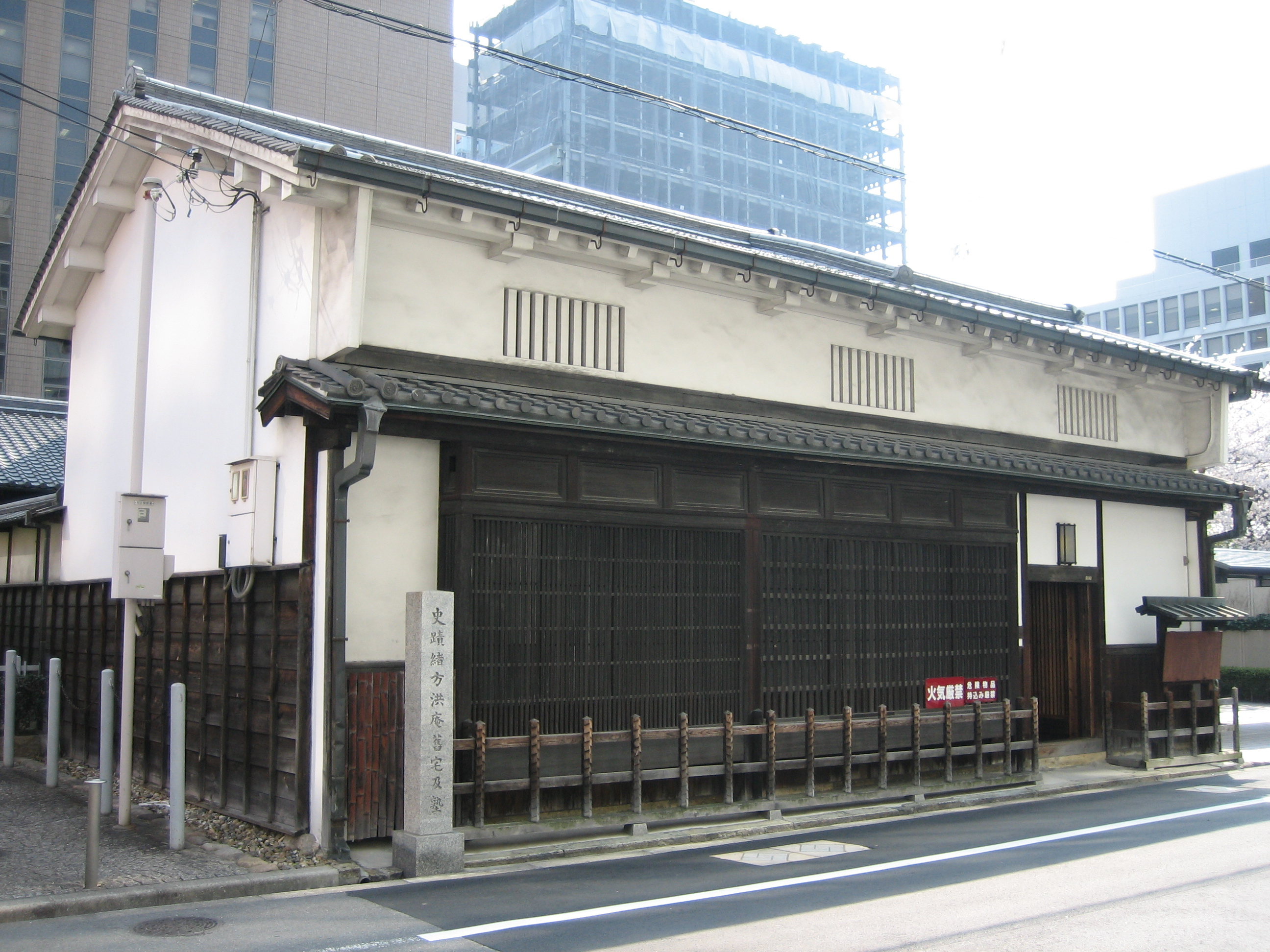
Tekijuku

The school was one of the predecessors of Osaka University and Keio University, through the work of the most notable people Ogata Koan and Fukuzawa Yukichi, respectively.

== Graduates ==
- Fukuzawa Yukichi
- Hashimoto Sanai
- Hanabusa Yoshitada
- Ikeda Kensai (ja:池田謙斎)
- Ishizaka Ikan (ja:石坂惟寛)
- Ishida Eikichi (ja:石田英吉)
- Kusaka Genki (ja:久坂玄機)
- Mitsukuri Shūhei (ja:箕作秋坪)
- Nagayo Sensai
- Ōmura Masujirō
- Ōtori Keisuke
- Sano Tsunetami
- Sugi Koji (ja:杉亨二)
- Takamatsu Ryōun (ja:高松凌雲)
- Takeda Ayasaburō
- Tezuka Ryōsen (ja:手塚良仙) - Great-grandfather of Tezuka Osamu
- Tokoro Ikutaro (ja:所郁太郎)

== Transportation ==
Tekijku is within walking distance of the following train stations:

- Yodoyabashi Station on the Keihan Railway Keihan Main Line and the Osaka Metro Midosuji Line
- Kitahama Station (Osaka) on the Keihan Railway Keihan Main Line and the Osaka Metro Sakaisuji Line
- Naniwabashi Station on the Keihan Nakanoshima Line

== See also ==
- Kaitokudo
- Osaka University
