= Katai Tayama =

Japanese writer

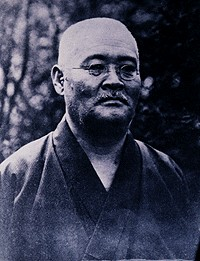
- Katai Tayama.
- Born: Rokuya Tayama; 22 January 1872; Tatebayashi, Gunma, Japan
- Died: 13 May 1930 (aged 58); Yoyogi, Tokyo, Japan
- Occupation: Writer
- Writing career
- Genres: Novels, short stories, diary
- Notable works: Inaka Kyōshi; Futon
- Literary movement: Naturalism

Katai Tayama (田山 花袋 Tayama Katai, 22 January 1872 – 13 May 1930, born Rokuya Tayama) was a Japanese author. His most famous works include Inaka Kyōshi (田舎教師, "Rural Teacher," also translated "Country Teacher") and Futon (蒲団, also translated "The Quilt"). He is noted for establishing the Japanese literary genre of naturalistic I novels which revolve around the detailed self-examinations of an introspective author. He also wrote about his experiences in the Russo-Japanese War.

== Life ==
He was born in Tatebayashi, Gunma Prefecture, into a shizoku (i.e. former samurai) family, at the time of the abolition of the privileges of that rank. His father entered the police force to support the household and was killed in April 1877 during the Satsuma Rebellion. Katai was sent with his elder brother and sister to Tokyo, where he entered a bookshop as an apprentice, but he lost his position and returned to Tatebayashi in 1882.

The whole family moved to Tokyo in 1886, and Tayama attended the poetry classes of Matsuura Tatsuo (1844-1909) before appealing to Kōyō Ozaki in 1891 for help in beginning a literary career; he soon fell out with Ozaki however, and it was Suiin Emi who helped Tayama establish himself as a travel writer. He joined the Bungakukai group in 1896, and became friends with Kunikida Doppo, who introduced him to the works of Western writers such as Guy de Maupassant, by which he was profoundly influenced. Tayama married in February 1899; his mother died in August, and in September he joined the staff of the newspaper Hakubunkan. In 1902 he achieved his first success with Jūemon no saigo, which was inspired by Hermann Sudermann's Katzensteg. In 1904 he was sent to Manchuria as a war correspondent. This experience led him to write stories such as Ippeisotsu ("One Soldier", 1908).

In 1903 a female admirer, Michiyo Okada (1885-1968), had written to him; apparently influenced by Gerhart Hauptmann's play Einsame Menschen, Tayama gave the fan permission to come to Tokyo as a literary pupil. She arrived in February 1904, but was a houseguest for only a month before he left for Manchuria on 23 March; after his return on 20 September, she moved back in, and stayed until January 1906. He did not begin an affair, but used the romantic tension as material for his most ambitious work yet, Futon (1907), which made his name as a writer, and established the Japanese literary genre known as the I Novel — although in fact Futon is largely recounted in the third person. (In January 1909, Okada was disinherited by her family, and Tayama adopted her as a daughter.) In 1907 he embarked instead on an affair with a geisha named Yone Iida (1889-?); this experience was unhappy, and punctuated by the deaths of friends and family members, with the result that his later works take on an obscure, pessimistic and religious tone. After the Great Kantō earthquake, Katai provided Iida with a place to stay because her house was destroyed in the disaster. This period of his relationship is covered in the novel One Hundred Nights (Momoyo, 1927). He continued to write until his death from throat cancer in 1930.

== Bibliography ==
- The quilt and other stories. Translated and with an introduction by Kenneth G. Henshall. University of Tokyo Press, 1981.
- A soldier shot to death. Translated and with an introduction by Kenshiro Homma. Yamaguchi Shoten, 1982.
- Country teacher: a novel. Translated by Kenneth Henshall. University of Hawaii Press, 1984.
- Literary life in Tōkyō, 1885-1915: Tayama Katai's memoirs "Thirty years in Tōkyō." Translated and introduced by Kenneth G. Henshall. Brill, 1987.
