= Takeo Arishima =

Japanese novelist and essayist (1878–1923)

- 有島 武郎
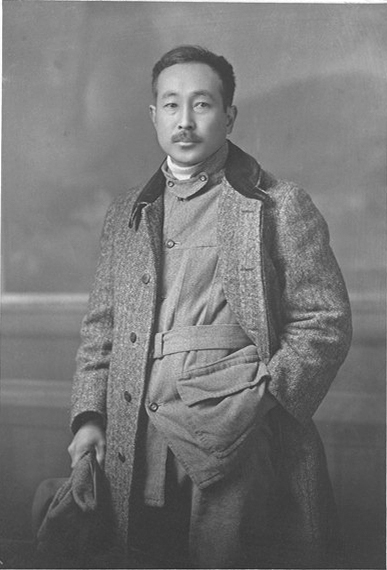
- Born: March 4, 1878; Tokyo, Japan
- Died: June 9, 1923 (aged 45); Karuizawa, Nagano, Japan
- Resting place: Tama Cemetery, Tokyo
- Occupation: Writer
- Children: Masayuki Mori
- Writing career
- Genres: short stories, novels, essays, literary criticism
- Notable works: A Certain Woman (或る女, Aru Onna)
- Movement: Shirakaba

Takeo Arishima (有島 武郎, Arishima Takeo; March 4, 1878 – June 9, 1923) was a Japanese novelist, short-story writer and essayist during the late Meiji and Taishō periods. His two younger brothers, Ikuma Arishima (有島生馬) and Ton Satomi (里美弴), were also authors. His son was the internationally known film and stage actor Masayuki Mori.

== Early life ==
Arishima was born in Tokyo, Japan into a wealthy family as the son of an ex-samurai official in the Ministry of Finance. He was first sent to a mission school in Yokohama, where he was taught English, after which he entered preparatory school of the prestigious Gakushuin peer's school, when he was 10 years old.

After he graduated from the Gakushuin at age 19, he entered the Sapporo Agricultural College (the present-day Faculty of Agriculture at Hokkaido University). During his studies at the university, he attempted suicide with Kokichi Morimoto (森本厚吉). Arishima subsequently became influenced by Uchimura Kanzō and became a Christian in 1901. Morimoto later went on to establish several women's schools around Japan.

After graduation and a mandatory short stint in the Imperial Japanese Army, Arishima took English lessons from Mary Elkinton Nitobe, Inazo Nitobe's wife, and in July 1903, he obtained a position as a foreign correspondent in the United States for the Mainichi Shimbun. In the United States he enrolled at Haverford College (a Quaker institution outside of Philadelphia) and later Harvard University. After graduation, he briefly worked in an insane asylum operated by the Quaker sect. He recorded his experiences from his journey to America in his diary.

During his time in America, he became critical towards Christianity, attracted to socialism, and influenced by the works of writers such as Walt Whitman, Henrik Ibsen, and Peter Kropotkin. His time and experiences in America and subsequent year in Europe also profoundly influenced his writing style and his outlook on the world, resulting in feelings of alienation from Japanese society.

After he returned to Japan in 1907, he re-entered the army briefly before becoming an English and ethics teacher in 1909 at his alma mater.

== Literary career ==
Through his brother Arishima Ikuma, he also became acquainted with authors who graduated from the Gakushuin, including Naoya Shiga and Saneatsu Mushanokōji. Arishima and these writers formed a group, which was named after their literary magazine Shirakaba (白樺, White Birch), which was first published in 1911. He wrote novels and literary criticisms and was known as one of the central figures in the Shirakaba group.

Arishima first achieved fame in 1917 with The Descendents of Cain (カインの末裔, Kain no Matsuei), which depicts God’s curse on both man and nature through the eyes of a self-destructive tenant farmer. In 1919 he published his best-known work: A Certain Woman (或る女, Aru Onna), a moral and psychological melodrama about a strong-willed woman struggling against a hypocritical male-dominated society. While critically acclaimed for his style, the themes and characters of Arishima’s works did not appeal to many contemporary Japanese readers.

== Later life ==
In 1922, Arishima implemented the socialist philosophy he had been developing by renunciation of the ownership of a large tenant farm in Hokkaidō, which he had inherited from his father, publicly stating that he wanted to distance himself from the petit bourgeois in the coming revolution.

Arishima married in 1910, but his wife died in 1916 of tuberculosis leaving him three children. In 1922, Arishima met Akiko Hatano, a married woman and an editor working for the Fujin Koron, a famous women's magazine. Their relationship quickly developed into an extramarital affair, which came to be known by Hatano's husband. This led to Arishima and Hatano committing suicide in Karuizawa by hanging themselves. Due to the isolated location, their bodies were not discovered for over a month, and were identified largely by the suicide note left behind. Arishima's grave is at the Tama Cemetery in Tokyo.

== Legacy ==
After his death, Arishima became known for his detailed diaries, covering more than twenty volumes, with an intimate record of his life, fears and hopes. His contemporaries regarded Arishima as a philosopher and social critic as much as a novelist. His writing was critical of Christianity and strongly influenced by socialism; emotionally intense, humanistic, and employed ideas from the Bible, Tolstoy, and anarchic socialism.

Arishima's major works include:

- Aru Onna (或る女, A Certain Woman) 1919
- Kain no Matsuei (カインの末裔, The Descendents of Cain), 1917

== Available in English ==
- A Certain Woman, transl. by Kenneth Strong, University of Tokyo Press, 1978, 382 pages, ISBN 0-86008-237-7.
- Labyrinth. Madison Books (2000). ISBN 0-8191-8293-1
- The Descendants of Cain, transl. by John Morrison, University of Utah Press, 1955.
- The Agony of Coming Into the World. Hokuseido Press (1955). ASIN: B0006AV8GE
- Death (A Play), transl. by Yozan Iwasaki and Glenn Hughes, D. Appleton and Company, NY, 1930.
