= Saneatsu Mushanokōji =

Japanese novelist, playwright and poet

- 武者小路 実篤
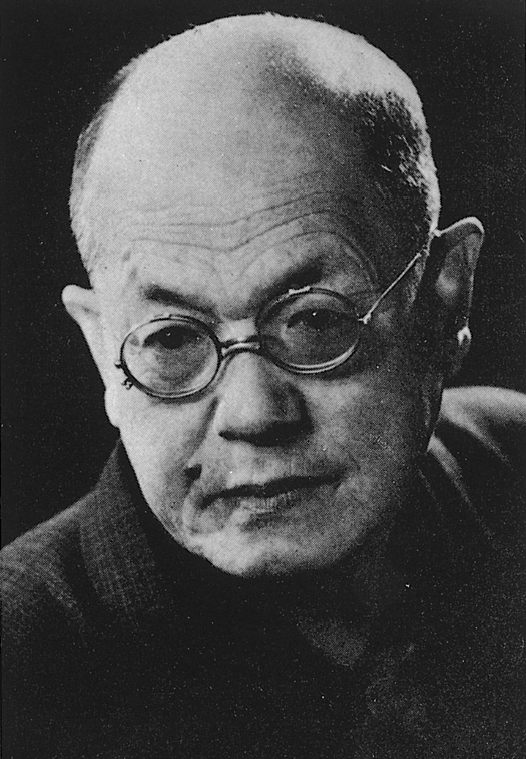
- Born: 12 May 1885; Kōjimachi, Tokyo, Japan
- Died: 9 April 1976 (aged 90); Komae, Tokyo, Japan
- Occupations: Novelist, playwright
- Relatives: Kintomo Mushanokōji (brother)
- Writing career
- Language: Japanese
- Notable works: Good-Natured Person (1910); Friendship (1920)
- Movements: Shirakaba; Idealism

Member of the House of Peers
- In office 22 March 1946 – 7 August 1946 Nominated by the Emperor

Saneatsu Mushanokōji

Japanese name
- Kanji: 武者小路 実篤
- Hiragana: むしゃのこうじ さねあつ
- Kyūjitai: 武者小路 實篤
Transcriptions
- Romanization: Mushanokōji Saneatsu

Saneatsu Mushanokōji (武者小路 実篤(實篤), Mushanokōji Saneatsu; 12 May 1885 – 9 April 1976) was a Japanese novelist, playwright, poet, artist, and philosopher active during the late Taishō and Shōwa periods of Japan. Later on in life he requested that the pronunciation of his surname (as far as was concerned) be changed from the usual Mushanokōji, to Mushakōji, but without much success. He was nicknamed Musha and Futo-o by his colleagues.

== Early life ==
Born in Kōjimachi, Chiyoda, Tokyo Saneatsu was the eighth son of Viscount Mushanokōji Saneyo, who died when Saneatsu was age two. Raised mostly by his mother. Saneatsu was a frail and sickly youth, unable to compete in the physical activities at the Gakushūin Peers' School. To compensate, he developed his debating skills and developed an interest in literature. During his time at this school he became friends with Naoya Shiga, and was introduced by his uncle to the Bible and the works of Tolstoy. Saneatsu enrolled in the sociology department of Tokyo Imperial University, but left without graduating in 1907 to form a literary group with Kinoshita Rigen, Shiga Naoya, Arishima Takeo, and Ogimachi Kinkazu (ja:正親町公和). They named the group Jūyokkakai (The Fourteenth Day Club). This group evolved into the Shirakaba (White Birch) literary coterie, and began publishing a literary magazine of the same name in 1910. In 1913, Saneatsu married Fusako Miyagi, a woman to whom he had earlier been introduced by Kokichi Otake. Both Miyagi and Otake were members of the women's literary association (and publishers of the journal of the same name), "Bluestocking".

== Literary career ==
As a key member of Shirakaba, Mushanokōji in 1910 published his work Omedetaki Hito (お目出たき人, Good Natured Person) in its magazine, Shirakaba. This was followed by Seken shirazu (世間知らず, Babe in the Woods), in 1912. Through the medium of Shirakaba, Mushanokōji began moving away from the Tolstoy ideal of self-sacrifice, and promoted his philosophy of humanism as an alternative to then-popular form of naturalism. While his humanism borrowed some elements from naturalism, he in general believed that humanity controlled its own destiny through the assertion of will, whereas the naturalists tended to see the individual as powerless and desperate against forces beyond personal control.

With the outbreak of World War I, Mushanokōji turned again to Tolstoy for inspiration and for the further development of his humanitarianism philosophy. During this time, he published Sono imōto (その妹, His Sister) (1915), a play involving a choice between self-love and love for mankind. He relocated to what is now part of Abiko, Chiba in 1916, together with Shiga Naoya and Yanagi Sōetsu.

In 1918, Mushanokōji took the next step in the development of his philosophy by moving to the mountains of Kijō, Miyazaki in Kyūshū, and establishing a quasi-socialistic utopian commune, Atarashiki-mura (New Village) along vaguely Tolstoyan lines. Soon afterwards, he published Kōfukumono (幸福者, A Happy Man) (1919), a novel presenting his image of the ideal human; and Yūjō (友情, Friendship) (1920), a novel portraying the victory of humanism over ego. His idealism appears in his autobiographical novel Aru otoko (或る男, A Certain Man) (1923), and in the play Ningen banzai (人間万歳, Three Cheers for Mankind) (1922). The commune also published its own literary magazine, Atarashiki-mura. In the 1920s, while running the commune, Mushanokōji was very prolific in his literary output. However, Mushanokōji tired of the social experiment and left the village in 1926; a dam project forced it to relocate to Saitama Prefecture in 1939, where it still exists.

After the Great Kantō earthquake of 1923, Mushanokōji returned to Tokyo to run an art gallery, and started to sell his own paintings, mostly still lifes depicting pumpkins and other vegetables. Publication of Shirakaba was suspended after the earthquake, but Mushanokōji went on to bring out the literary magazine, Fuji, with the novelist and playwright Nagayo Yoshirō. During this period, he turned his attention to writing historical novels or biographical novels, such as Ninomiya Sontoku, about the 19th century farm technologist and agricultural philosopher.

Through the 1930s and 1940s, he faded from the literary world. Encouraged by his older brother Kintomo Mushanokōji, who was the Japanese ambassador to Nazi Germany, he traveled throughout Europe in 1936. In 1946, he was appointed to a seat in the House of Peers of the Diet of Japan. However, four months later he was purged from public office by the American Occupation authorities, due to his Dai Tōa Senso Shikan (大東亜戦争私観, Personal Thoughts on the Great East Asia War ) (1942), supporting the actions of the Japanese government in World War II.

Mushanokōji made a literary comeback with his novel Shinri sensei (真理先生, Teacher of Truth) (1949–1950). He was awarded the Order of Culture in 1951, and became a member of the Japan Art Academy in 1952.

Mushanokōji lived to the age of 90. He died at the Jikei University School of Medicine Hospital in Komae, Tokyo of uremia. His grave is at the Chūō Reien in the city of Hachiōji, close to Tokyo. His home in Chōfu, Tokyo, where he lived from 1955 to 1976 has been turned into a memorial museum.

== Ancestry ==
Ancestors of Saneatsu Mushanokōji

16. Sanjōnishi Mihaka (1727-1791)
8. Mushanokōji Kimitaka (1785-1855)
17. Sanjō
4. Mushanokōji Sanetatsu (1810-1863)
2. Viscount Mushanokōji Saneo (1851-1887)
1. Mushanokōji Saneatsu
24. Uramatsu Mitsuyo (1736-1804)
12. Uramatsu Yasumitsu (1800-1872)
6. Viscount Kadenokōji Sukeyori (1827-1893)
26. Fujinami Hirotada (1759-1824)
13. Fujinami Yōko (d. 1858)
27. Nakayama Asukako (d. 1809)
3. Hon. Kadenokōji Akiko (1853-1928)
14. Kobayashi Bunri
7. Kobayashi

== See also ==
- Japanese literature
- List of Japanese authors

== Works ==
- Yozan T. Iwasaki, Glenn Hughes (eds.), New Plays from Japan (1930), contains a play by Mushanokōji
