= Shirakaba (magazine) =

Japanese literary and art magazine (1910–1923)

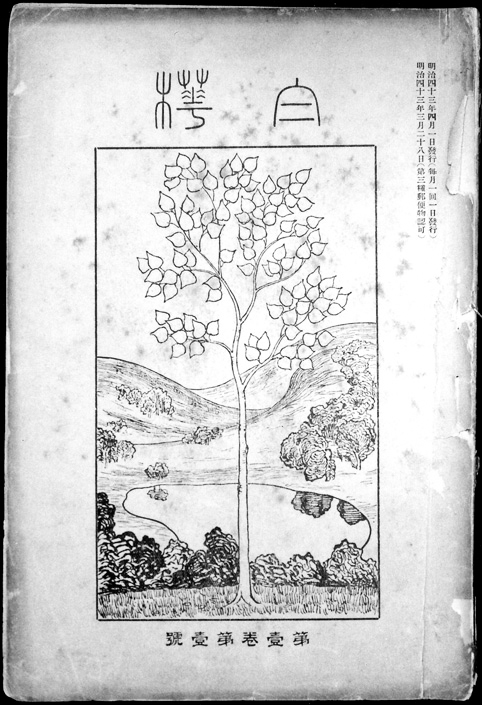
- Cover of the first issue dated April 1910
- Categories: Literary magazine; Art magazine
- Founder: Shirakaba-ha
- Founded: 1910
- First issue: April 1910
- Final issue: January 1923
- Country: Japan
- Language: Japanese

Shirakaba (Japanese: 白樺; White Birch) was an avant-garde literary and art magazine which existed in the period between 1910 and 1923.

== History and profile ==
Shirakaba was launched in 1910 by a group of the Japanese writers, art critics, artists, including Naoya Shiga, Takeo Arishima, and Saneatsu Mushanokōji. They were the members of the Shirakabaha (Japanese: White Birch School) group which opposed to the Confucian worldview, naturalism, and dominant Japanese traditions. The first issue of Shirakaba appeared in April 1910. The magazine acted as a platform for the Japanese writers and artists who wanted to try new literary and artistic forms. Main contributors included Kōtarō Takamura, Ryūzaburō Umehara, and Ryūsei Kishida. They were supporters of the German expressionism, post-impressionist movements, and other avant-garde movements originated in the Western countries. Based on the views and works of Leo Tolstoy they attempted to advance the ideologies of individualism, idealism, and humanitarianism into the Japanese society.

Bernard Leach designed the covers of Shirakaba in 1913. The magazine folded following the publication of the final issue dated January 1923. During its lifetime Shirakaba 160 issues.

== Content ==
In the first issue the magazine featured the photogravures of paintings by the symbolist artists such as Arnold Klinger, Franz Stuck, and Arnold Böcklin. In the next issues it contained the daguerreotype prints of paintings by the post-impressionist artists, including Auguste Rodin, Édouard Manet, Claude Monet, Pierre-Auguste Renoir, Edgar Degas, Vincent van Gogh, Paul Gauguin, and Paul Cézanne. Most of these paintings were first published in a Japanese publication. Shirakaba was also the first Japanese periodical which featured translations of the work by Western writers and artists. For instance, it issued the Japanese translations of Paul Gauguin's Noa, Noa, Julius Meier-Graefe’s Paul Cézanne, van Gogh's Lettres and C. Lewis Hind’s The Post-Impressionists (1911). In the January 1912 issue the magazine published Yanagi Sōetsu's manifesto entitled Kakumei no gaka (Japanese: The Revolutionary Artist). In the April 1914 issue of Bernard Leach published an article on William Blake.
