= Funahashi Seiichi =

Japanese writer

Seiichi Funahashi
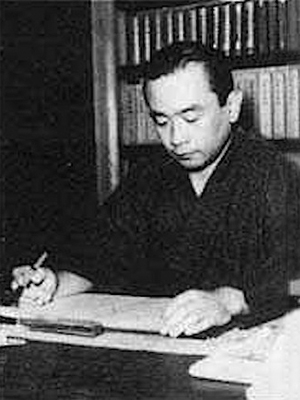
- Seiichi Funahashi
- Born: 25 December 1904; Tokyo, Japan
- Died: 13 January 1976 (aged 71); Tokyo, Japan
- Occupation: Writer

Seiichi Funahashi (舟橋聖一, Funahashi Seiichi; 25 December 1904 – 13 January 1976) was a Japanese writer of short stories, novellas, novels and stage plays, active in the Shōwa period.

== Biography ==
Funahashi was born in what is now part of Sumida, Tokyo, where his father was an assistant professor of engineering at Tokyo Imperial University. He had one sister and three younger brothers, and as an infant, he suffered from pertussis, which developed into chronic asthma. When his father was transferred to Germany for further studies, Funahashi was entrusted to the care of his grandmother in the Koshigoe neighborhood of Kamakura, Kanagawa, where he spend most of his youth. He attended Tokyo Imperial University’s School of Arts and Sciences, where he joined literature and drama clubs. His literary coterie included Tomoyoshi Murayama, Tomoji Abe, Ujaku Akita, Masuji Ibuse, Motojirō Kajii and Shigeru Tonomura, and his early works and activities with the Shingeki movement drew the attention of Hidemi Kon and Hideo Kobayashi.

His first novel Daibingu ("Diving") was published in 1934, serialized in the magazine Kōdō ("Action!"), which he also helped create. Kōdō (published from 1934-1936) spoke out for liberalism, internationalism and modernism in opposition to the ultranationalism which swept Japan in the 1930s. Inspired by André Gide and Andre Malraux, Funahashi hoped to create a popular front movement among writers; however, the movement soon faded into obscurity. By 1940, Funahashi had joined the government-sponsored Literary Home Front Drive (Bungei Jugō Undō) along with 43 other prominent writers, and created works in support of the war effort.

Funahashi worked as a lecturer at Takushoku University and from 1938 at Meiji University. In 1948, he became chairman of the Japan Writer’s Association, and became a member of the Akutagawa Prize selection committee in 1949. He was selected as a member of the National Language Policy Board of the Ministry of Education in 1950. His 1953 novel, Hana no Shogai (花の生涯) about the life of Bakumatsu period official Ii Naosuke was adapted for television as the first NHK taiga drama. In 1964, Funahashi was awarded the Mainichi Art Award for Aru onna no enkei ( ある女の遠景 ). He became a member of the Japan Art Academy in 1966.

However, from 1966, the increasing deterioration of his eyesight led to near blindness, and Funahashi resorted to dictation in order to continue his literary activities. In 1967 he was awarded the Noma Award for Sukina onna no munakazari (好きな女の胸飾り). Long a proponent of sumo wrestling, and a member of the Sumo Promotion Council, he was chairman in 1969. In 1975, Funahashi was named a Person of Cultural Merit by the Japanese government.

Funahashi died of acute myocardial infarction at the Nippon Medical School Hospital in Tokyo in 1976 at the age of 71, leaving behind two unfinished works, Taikō Hideyoshi, serialized by Yomiuri Shimbun, and Genji Monogatari serialized by the Heibonsha magazine Taiyo.
