= Tomoji Abe =

Japanese writer and translator

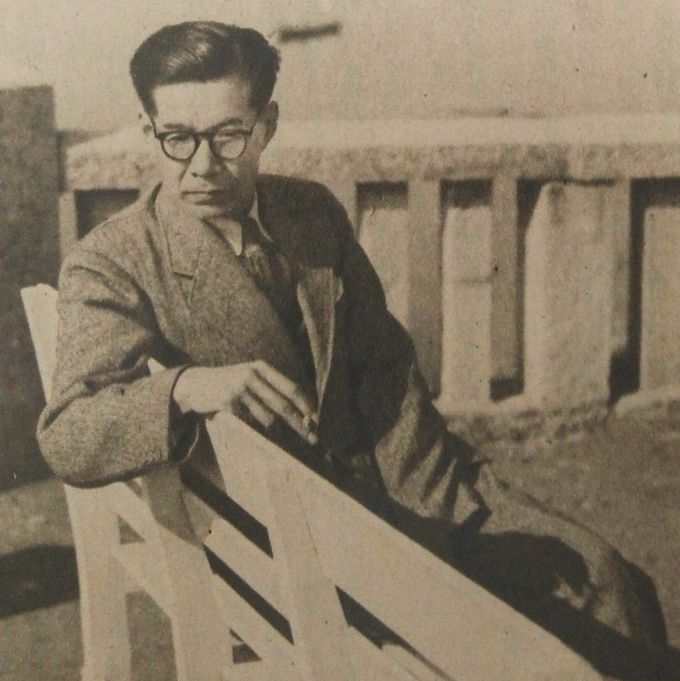
- Born: 26 June 1903; Yunogō, Mimasaka, Okayama
- Died: 23 April 1973 (aged 69)
- Education: Tokyo Imperial University
- Spouse: Sumiko Ohama
- Writing career
- Language: Japanese
- Literary movement: Modernism

Tomoji Abe (阿部 知二, Abe Tomoji; 26 June 1903 – 23 April 1973) was a Japanese novelist, social critic, humanist, and translator of English and American literature. Although he began writing as a modernist, in his later works he represented the intellectual movement in Japanese literature. This movement departed from Japanese traditional thinking and from established forms of narration, which focused on aesthetic values and emotional states of mind (such as appear in the works of Junichiro Tanizaki and Ryunosuke Akutagawa); it also departed from modernist views, which continued to be popular in world literature and in Japan (Japanese modernist writers included Haruo Satō, Sei Ito, Tatsuo Hori, Riichi Yokomitsu and Yasunari Kawabata). Abe's intellectual approach was incompatible with the socio-political atmosphere of Japan in the early Shōwa period (1926–1945), with rising fascism and militarism, and the crusade to preserve Japanese feudal traditions.

== Early life ==
Tomoji Abe was born in Yunogō, Mimasaka, Okayama, the second son of Ryōhei Abe, a junior-high-school teacher of natural history, and his wife Hayo Mori. Ryōhei's job postings took his family to Yonago in Tottori Prefecture and Kizuchi in Shimane Prefecture; Tomoji attended Yōran elementary school, Himeji Middle School in Himeji, Hyōgo and Dai-hachi High School in Nagoya. In 1921, while in high school, Abe took a one-year leave to recover from a lung illness, which proved to be non-threatening, and during this year began to write tanka poems under the guidance of Kōhei. In 1923, Abe published his poems in Kōyukai Zasshi magazine. At this time he admired the tanka poet Akahiko Shimagi, and read the novels of Leo Tolstoy and Anton Chekhov. In 1924, after finishing high school, Abe enrolled at Tokyo Imperial University's (now Tokyo University) Department of English Literature. He was particularly interested in the British Romantic poets of the 19th century. Abe's personal contact with foreign thinking and attitudes was through one of his teachers, the English poet Edmund Blunden who in 1924 taught English Literature there. Abe, together with Blunden's other students, at first surprised with the Englishman's informal and approachable manner and, perhaps with his pacifism, liked and admired him, and Abe later said that Blunden was Japan's best friend and brought out the best in them. Abe became acquainted with British modernism, and especially the concepts of intellectualism associated with T.E. Hulme, Herbert Read and T.S. Eliot.

In 1927, Abe graduated from Tokyo University with a thesis on Edgar Allan Poe as a poet and then enrolled in graduate school.

== Early work ==
Tomoji Abe began his writing career as a modernist. In November 1925, while at university, he contributed his maiden work, Kasei (Metaplasia), and an essay, Kyoseisha no Tamashii (The Spirit of Rectifier) to Shumon (Red Gate), the Department of Literature's magazine. He became acquainted with the editor of Shumon, writer Seiichi Funabashi, who in 1967 received the Noma Literary Prize for Suki na Onna no Munakazari (好きな女の胸飾り) (The Beloved Lady's Pectorals). Abe, Funabashi and others advocated modernism in opposition to Marxism. In 1926, Abe associated himself with Aozora (Blue Skies), a coterie magazine published by the young writers Motojirō Kajii and Nakatani Takao, and the then-budding poet and literary critic Tatsuji Miyoshi. In 1928, after Aozora folded in 1927, Abe contributed to another coterie literary magazine Bungei Toshi (Age of Art and Literature) with Seiichi Funabashi, the young writer Masuji Ibuse and the critic and writer Hidemi Kon. In 1929, partly in response to Ryunosuke Akutagawa's suicide, Abe wrote Shuchi-teki Bungaku-ron (On Intellectualist Literature), which he published in Shi to Shiron (Poetry and Poetic Theory) magazine, founded in the previous year by Tatsuji Miyoshi and the writer Sakutarō Hagiwara.

Abe's professional debut was Nichi-Doku Taiko Kyōgi (The Japan-Germany Athletic Games); it appeared in the January 1930 issue of the avant-garde literary magazine Shinchō and was instantly welcomed as a promising young writer by the Shinkō Geijutsu (Modern Art) movement. The heroine, the young wife of an elderly professor, becomes erotically fascinated with German athletes, especially one of them, and in her thoughts succumbs to the sexual temptation though she never acts upon her impulses. The work is considered to have a feminist overtone because it exposes the unhappiness of an arranged marriage of a young woman to an elderly man.

1930 was the year in which Abe wrote several modernist-style short stories and in which Shuchi-teki Bungaku-ron was published by Kōseikaku in book form with other essays.

Abe's last modernistic work, written in 1936, was Fuyu no Yado (冬の宿, A Winter Lodging). It became his acclaimed work and the basis for his post-war writing. It is the story of a Japanese family split between the debauched, wasteful and cruel husband, Kamon Kirishima, and his devout Christian wife, Matsuko, sexually repressed, whose forbearance seems limitless. However, there is an undertone of desire to control in Masako's patience. The narrator, who witnesses their lives, recounts the story in calm, objective manner. Despite this cool, formal objectivism, however, the novel disconcerts by exposing the irrational complexity of human psyche with its antagonistic forces and repressed desires, the conflict between two fundamental elements of human nature—instinct and intelligence. On another level, Fuyu no Yado is seen as Abe's attack on Japan's strengthening nationalistic fascism, which is represented by Masako's manipulations to convert others to Christianity, while the negative consequences of her efforts, her declining health, the disintegration of the family and its final destruction, predicts the country's future.

== Post-war work ==
Tomoji Abe's post-war writing had a humanistic and socio-critical nature. He opposed militarism and exploitation of human beings, and urged respect for human dignity (Ningen Besshi ni Kōshite —Resisting Contempt for Human Beings—essay, 1955). His novel Shiroi Tō (White Pillar), expressed anti-militaristic views and spoke against the excesses of financial/business monopolies. Intellectually independent and uncompromising, Abe was among the writers who believed in the need of rebirth of literature. He believed that literature, and writers, should be useful to society and stimulate its progress, and wrote, apart from works of fiction, numerous essays and theoretical works in which he expressed these views.

== Personal life ==
Abe married Sumiko Ohama in 1930. They had two sons, Yoshio (born 1932) who became a scholar and professor of French literature, and Nobuo (born 1948) who became a critic and chief curator at the Bridgestone Art Museum, and three daughters, Hiroko (born 1937), Michiko (born 1941), and Noriko (born 1944). In May 1944, his family evacuated to Himeji to escape expected bombing while he remained in Tokyo; in the same month his father died. In July 1945, Abe removed to Mimasaka in Okayama to escape the intensive bombing of Tokyo and in November, three months after Japan's capitulation, he joined his family in Himeji. In April 1950, Abe traveled to Hiroshima with other writers, among them Yasunari Kawabata) for a meeting of the Japan Pen Club and delivered a lecture on "War and Peace". He continued to be interested in Marxism but in the atmosphere of Cold War was cautious about revealing his interests and political views. Abe traveled to Europe in the summer and returned to Tokyo at the end of 1950. Upon his return, Abe was surprised to see that Japan was relatively stable and peaceful, having heard rumors of the Korean War extending violence to Japan's shores while in Europe. In 1953, Abe stood at the bar as special defender in connection with the May Day Incident of 1 May 1952, when, during the May Day demonstration, a Communist-led group forced its way to Imperial Plaza; in the subsequent clash between demonstrators and police people on both sides were killed and injured. In March 1959, Abe and Kiyoshi Aono issued a written protest against the revision of the Treaty of Mutual Cooperation and Security between the United States and Japan. Abe was a passionate and outspoken critic of the Vietnam War. In May 1965, Abe, Rokurō Hidaka, a prominent academic and author of The Price of Affluence: Dilemmas of Contemporary Japan, and Yoshio Nakano, editor of the left-wing journal Heiwa ("Peace") protested against the Vietnam War and called for a united anti-war movement. In October 1966, Abe and Nakano called for a strike against the Vietnam War. In March 1968, Abe resigned from Meiji University and, with scientist Minoru Oda, called for a nationwide movement against the Vietnam War. In 1969, on a trip with his wife to Europe, Abe visited Edmund Blunden, his university lecturer.

In November 1971, Abe was diagnosed with cancer of the esophagus and hospitalised. He died on 23 April 1973, leaving an unfinished novel, Hoshū, which he had been dictating in his last year of life and which was published posthumously.

== Published works ==
- Kasei (Metaplasia) and Kyoseisha-no Tamashii (The Spirit of Rectifier), essays, Shumon. 1925
- Shuchi-teki Bungakuron (On Intellectualist Literature), essay, Shi-to Shiron. 1929; book, Kōseikaku. 1930
- Nichi–Doku Taikō Kyōgi (日独対抗競技) (The Japan–Germany Athletic Games), short story, Shinchō 1930
- Shiroi Shikan (White Officer), short story, Shinchō. 1930
- Koi to Afurika (恋とアフリカ) (Love and Africa), short story, Shinchō. 1930
- Shinema no Kokujin (シネマの黒人) (A Negro in Cinema), short story. 1930
- Umi no Aibu (海の愛撫) (Caress of the Sea), short story, Shinchō. 1930
- Bungaku to Rinrisei (Literature and Morality), essay, Kōdō. 1933
- Riarizumu to Shinjitsu (Realism and the Truth), essay, Kōdō. 1934
- Bungaku to Nikutai (Literature and the Flesh), essay, Kōdō. 1934
- Bungaku no Kōsatsu (A Study of Literature), collection of essays, Kinokuniya. 1934
- Merubiru (Melville), critical biography, Kenkyūsha. 1934
- Arechi (Wasteland), short story, Kōdō. 1935
- Fuyu no Yado (冬の宿) (A Winter Lodging), novel, Bungakkai (January–October issues, 1936); book (November), Dai-ichi Shobō. 1936
- Genei (幻影) (Illusion), short story, Shinchō. 1936
- Shi to Renai (Poems and Love), trans. PB Shelley's poems and essays, Daiichi Shobō. 1936
- Kōfuku (幸福) (Happiness), Kawade Shobō. 1937
- Bairon (Byron), critical biography, Kenkyūsha. 1937
- Pekin (北京) (Peking), Dai-ichi Shobō. 1938
- Bairon Shishū (Byron's Poems Collection), Shinchōsha. 1938
- Fūsetsu (風雪) (Wind and Snow), first installments in Nihon Hyōron. 1938
- Bungakuronshū (A Compilation of Literary Theories), Kawade Shobō. 1938
- Kage (Shadow), Bungakkai. 1939
- Machi (街) (Town), Shinchōsha. 1939
- Oki ni Mesu Mama (As You Like It), trans. of W. Shakespeare's play, Iwanami Bunko. 1939
- Fūsetsu (風雪) (Wind and Snow), book, Sōgensha. 1939
- Hikari to Kage (光と影) (Light and Shadow), Shinchōsha. 1939
- Merubiru Hakugei (Melville's Moby Dick), partial trans., Chisei. 1940
- Hi no Shima Jawa, Baritō no Ki (火の島 ジャワ・バリ島の記) (Report from Jawa, the Island of Fire, and from Bali), collection of essays. 1944
- Ryokui (緑衣) (Green Robe), Shinchōsha. 1946
- Shi no Hana (死の花) (Flower of Death), Sekai. 1946
- Jojō to Hyōgen (Lyricism and Expression), collection of essays, Yōtokusha. 1948
- Kuroi Kage (黒い影) (Black Shadow), Hosokawa Shoten. 1949
- Shiro Inaka kara no Tegami (城 田舎からの手紙) (The Castle: Letters from the Countryside), short stories collection, Tokyo, Sōgensha. 1949
- Hakugei I (白鯨第1巻) (Moby Dick I), book, Chikuma Shobō. 1949
- Hakugei II (白鯨第2巻) (Moby Dick II), book, Chikuma Shobō. 1950
- Jinkō Teien (人工庭園) (A Fake Garden), Gunzō, (in 1954 made into film Onna no Sono). 1953
- Hakugei III (白鯨第3巻) (Moby Dick III), book, Chikuma Shobō. 1954
- Chisei ni Tsuite (About Intelligence), essay. 1954
- Ningen Besshi ni Kōshite (Resisting Contempt for Human Beings), essay, Bungei (Kawade Shobō Shinsha). 1955
- Genbaku to Bungaku (Atom Bomb and Literature), essay, Mita Bungaku. 1955
- Idainaru Michi (偉大なる道) (The Great Road), trans. of Agnes Smedley's The Great Road: The Life and Times of Chu The, Iwanami Shoten. 1955
- Rekishi no Naka e (Inside History), collection of essays, Ōtsuki Shoten. 1955
- Shōsetsu no Yomikata (How to Read Novels), essay, Shibundō. 1955
- Jitsugetsu no Mado (日月の窓) (Windows to the Sun and Moon), Kōdansha. 1955
- Jein Ea (ジェイン・エア), trans. of C. Bronte's Jane Eyre, Kawade Shobō Shinsha. 1955
- Arashiga Oka (嵐が丘), trans. of E. Bronte's Wuthering Heights, Iwanami Shoten. 1955
- Gūwa (Allegory), trans. of W. Faulkner's novel, Iwanami Shoten. 1955
- Tsuki to Rokupensu (月と六ペンス), trans. of Somerset Maugham's The Moon and Sixpence, Sekai Bungaku Zenshu (Kawade Shobō Shinsha). 1961
- Sekai Bungaku no Nagare (Currents in World Literature), literary theory, Kawade Shobō Shinsha. 1963
- Shiroi Tō (白い塔) (White Pillar), novel, Iwanami Shoten. 1963
- Takarajima, trans. of R.L. Stevenson's Treasure Island, Iwanami Bunko. 1963
- Koman to Henken (高慢と偏見), trans. of J. Austen's Pride and Prejudice, Kawade Shobō Shinsha. 1963
- Ryōshin-teki Heieki Kyohi no Shisō (良心的兵役拒否の思想) (The Philosophy Behind Conscientious Objection). 1969
- Hoshū (捕囚) (Captive), novel, began writing in August, 1971; work interrupted by illness; continued, dictating, in 1972. Unfinished novel published posthumously. 1973

== Other published translations ==
Abe was a prolific translator of English and American literature. He is known as the translator of the Sherlock Holmes series (1960). He also translated other foreign works from English; for example the Polish Nobel Prize–winning author Władysław Reymont's Peasants (2nd Vol) (1939) and Valmiki Ramayana (1966).

Abe's other literary translations include: Oscar Wilde's De Profundis, 1935 and The Happy Prince, 1954; Thomas Hardy's Under the Greenwood Tree, 1936 and Tess, 1969; Daniel Defoe's Robinson Crusoe, 1952; Charles and Mary Lamb's Tales from Shakespeare, 1954; Jack London's Call of the Wild, 1955; Sir Arthur Conan Doyle's Silver Blaze, 1958; Mark Twain's Adventures of Tom Sawyer, c. 1959; Rudyard Kipling's The Jungle Book, 1961; Jane Austen's Emma, 1965 and Persuasion, 1968; Marjorie Kinnan Rawlings' The Yearling, 1965; Eleanor Farjeon's The Silver Curlew, 1968; Walter de la Mare's Stories from the Bible, 1970.

== Works translated into foreign languages ==
Fuyu no Yado (Polish Zimowa kwatera) trans. Ewelina Tchórzewska-Adamowska, Książka i Wiedza. 1973

Nichi-Doku Taiko Kyogi (The Japan-Germany Athletic Games) trans. Misako Matsumura in Abe Tomoji, Japanese Modernist Novelist as Social Critic and Humanist, the Early Years (1925–19360). A Thesis Presented in Partial Fulfilment for the Degree Master of Arts in the Graduate School of the Ohio State University. 1998. Published online.

The Communist trans. Jay Gluck and Grace Suzuki. Ukiyo: stories of "the Floating World" of Postwar Japan, Jay Gluck, ed., 1963

Shinema no Kokujin (A Negro in Cinema) trans. Ayanna Bajita Doretha Hobbs. In Phallic Power of African American Men: a Study in Japanese Literature (1930–Present). A Thesis presented for the Degree Master of Arts in the Graduate School of the Ohio State University. 1999. Published online.
