= Im Won-sik =

South Korean conductor (1919–2002)

- 임원식
- Im in 1976
- Born: June 24, 1919; Uiju County, Heianhoku Prefecture, Korea, Empire of Japan
- Died: August 26, 2002 (aged 83); Seoul, South Korea
- Occupations: conductor, composer, educator
- Years active: 1940–2002

Korean name
- Hangul: 임원식
- Hanja: 林元植
- RR: Im Wonsik
- MR: Im Wŏnsik

Im Won-sik (Korean: 임원식; Hanja: 林元植; June 24, 1919 – August 26, 2002) was a South Korean conductor, composer, and musical pedagogue. According to his obituary in the Asahi Shimbun, Im was the "father of the Korean classical music world"; he has also been referred to as "Korea's Toscanini."

== Biography ==
Im was born in Uiju County, Heianhoku Prefecture, Korea, Empire of Japan (today Uiju, North Pyongan Province, North Korea) to a family of devout Christians. When Im was four years old, his family moved to Harbin in Manchuria. Im's first exposures to music occurred in church, where he learned to play the organ. During his teenage years, Im supported his family by playing piano at movie theatres and hymns at church. Im graduated from a music school founded by White Russians in 1939. The following year Im enrolled at the Tokyo Academy of Music, where he studied with Moroi Saburō. Im made his public debut there as a pianist in 1940. While living in Tokyo, Im earned a living arranging film music. Upon graduation in 1942, Im moved to Manchukuo where he worked with the Harbin Symphony Orchestra. It was there that Im met Asahina Takashi, whose conducting he admired. Im later became Asahina's only pupil as well as lifelong friend. After the end of the Pacific War, Im sheltered Asahina from Soviet soldiers in his home and helped to arrange his return to Japan.

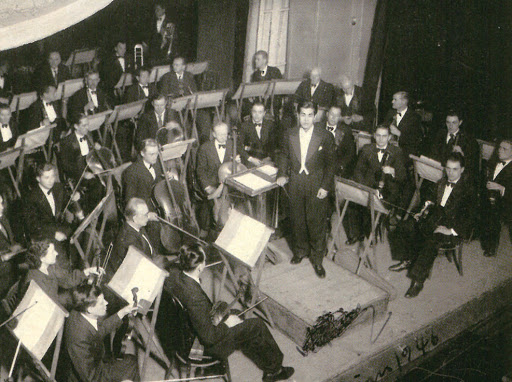
Im Won-sik (at the podium) making his conducting debut with the Harbin Symphony Orchestra in November 1945.

After departing from Manchuria, Im returned to his homeland. In January 1948, Im led a performance of La traviata in Seoul, the first ever complete operatic production in Korea. Financial difficulties in Korea's nascent orchestral infrastructure led him to embark to the United States for studies at the Juilliard School. While in the United States, Im took private lessons with Arnold Schoenberg and conducting lessons from Serge Koussevitzky. In 1949, Im became the first Asian conductor to lead the Boston Symphony Orchestra.

Im returned to Korea in 1949. On September 23, 1950, Im was arrested and detained by South Korean police on charges of having collaborated with North Korea during its brief occupation of Seoul earlier that year. In 1953, Im was a co-founder and later principal of the Seoul Arts High School. Later, he was also a dean and professor at Kyung Hee University and at the Chugye University for the Arts. Three years later Im was appointed the first music director of the KBS Symphony Orchestra, a position he held until 1970.

When composer Yun Isang was arrested in the East Berlin Affair espionage scandal in 1967, Im testified on his behalf, petitioned for his release, and continued to perform his music. Im led the Korean premieres of Yun's Symphony No. 3 and Violin Concerto.

In 1984, Im was appointed music director of the Incheon Philharmonic Orchestra. He stepped down from the position in 1990; two years later he was appointed the orchestra's honorary permanent conductor. Im was also appointed honorary permanent conductor of the KBS Symphony. Im marked the golden jubilee of his career debut by conducting a cycle of all nine Beethoven symphonies.

When in 1971 the Osaka Philharmonic Orchestra came to Seoul to perform its first concert outside of Japan, its then music director Asahina invited Im to share the conducting duties. Decades later they planned a joint concert to commemorate the 2002 FIFA World Cup, but it could not be realized on account of Asahina's death in December 2001. Im—along with Wakasugi Hiroshi, Toyama Yūzō, and Iwaki Hiroyuki—conducted at Asahina's memorial concert on February 7, 2002. The World Cup concert with the Tokyo Philharmonic Orchestra, which he had originally envisioned to be shared with Asahina, was led by Im alone on June 1, 2002. The performance would be his last. Shortly thereafter, Im was diagnosed with terminal stomach cancer. He died weeks later on August 26 in Seoul.

Im was a polyglot, being fluent in Japanese, Chinese, Russian, and English, as well as in his native Korean.

Cultural offices
Preceded by none	Principal Conductor, KBS Symphony Orchestra; 1956–1971	Succeeded by Hong Yeon-Taek
