= Sinfonietta =

Sinfonietta may refer to:

- Sinfonietta (orchestra), a musical group that is larger than a chamber ensemble but smaller than a full-size orchestra
- Sinfonietta (symphony), a symphony that is smaller in scale or lighter in approach than a standard symphony
- Sinfonietta (Britten), a 1932 composition by Benjamin Britten
- Sinfonietta (Janáček), a 1926 composition by Leoš Janáček
- Sinfonietta (Korngold), a 1912 composition by Erich Wolfgang Korngold
- Sinfonietta (Moroi), a 1943 composition by Saburō Moroi
- Sinfonietta (Theodorakis), a 1947 composition by Mikis Theodorakis
- Sinfonietta (Poulenc), a 1947 composition by Francis Poulenc
- Sinfonietta (Dahl), a 1961 composition by Ingolf Dahl
- Sinfonietta, a 1978 ballet by Jiří Kylián
