= Cheon Sang-byeong =

South Korean writer (1930–1993)

- Born: January 29, 1930; Japan
- Died: April 28, 1993 (aged 63)
- Citizenship: South Korean
- Education: Seoul National University
- Writing career
- Language: Korean

- Korean name
- Hangul: 천상병
- Hanja: 千祥炳
- RR: Cheon Sangbyeong
- MR: Ch'ŏn Sangbyŏng

Cheon Sang-byeong (Korean: 천상병; January 29, 1930 – April 28, 1993) was a South Korean writer.

== Life ==
Cheon Sang-byeong was born in the Empire of Japan on January 29, 1930. He immigrated to Masan, Korea in 1945, after Korea was liberated from Japan. It was then that the 15-year-old Cheon began writing poems in the language of his ancestry. He published his first poem "River Water" while still in school. Cheon went to Seoul National University for a short period. In 1967 he was implicated in the East Berlin Spy Incident and jailed for six months during which he was tortured. This experience scarred Cheon who became impotent and alcoholic. Found unconscious on the street Cheon was institutionalized and his friends, believing him to be dead, published a posthumous book of his poetry.

Cheon, however recovered and began a prolific career.

== Work ==
Cheon's poetry was written in a condensed style, and explored themes of existentialism. His most famous poem "Return to Heaven" (Gwicheon), speaks of a man's encounter with the afterlife and his journey from life to death, as a passing from one world to another: "I am returning to heaven, the day on which my sojourn to this beautiful world ends. Go and say it was beautiful".

== Works in translation ==
- Rumanian: L ÎNTOARCEREA ÎN CER detail (천상병 시선집)
- Serbian: ПОВРАТАК НА НЕЪО detail (천상병 시선집 <귀천>)
- Spanish: Regreso al cielo detail (귀천)
- Turkish: Gőğe dőnüş detail (귀천)
- French: Retour au ciel detail (천상병시선-귀천)

== Works in Korean (Partial) ==
- Bird (1971)
- At the Roadside Inn (1979)
- If Even the Journey to Afterlife Costs Money (1987)
- I'm Going Back to Heaven (1993)
- Collected Works of Cheon Sang-byeong (1996)
