= Hidemi Kon =

Japanese literary critic and essayist

- 今 日出海
- Born: 6 November 1903; Hakodate, Hokkaidō, Japan
- Died: 30 July 1984 (aged 80); Kamakura, Kanagawa, Japan
- Resting place: Catholic Cemetery, Kamakura, Japan
- Education: Tokyo Imperial University
- Occupations: Writer and literary critic
- Writing career
- Language: Japanese
- Genres: essayist and literary criticism, short stories

Signature
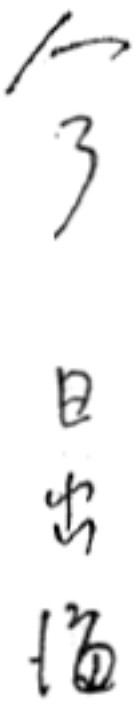

Hidemi Kon (今 日出海, Kon Hidemi; 6 November 1903 – 30 July 1984) was a literary critic and essayist active in Japan during the Shōwa period.

== Early life ==
Born in Hakodate, Hokkaidō, Kon Hidemi was the younger brother of writer, politician and Buddhist priest Kon Tōkō. His father was a captain of a steamer operated by Nippon Yusen, and the family relocated to Kobe from 1911. Kon moved to Tokyo in 1918, and was accepted into the French Literature Department of Tokyo Imperial University. His classmates included Hideo Kobayashi and Tatsuji Miyoshi, During this period, he became interested in drama, visiting the Tsukiji New Theater, and took part in stage plays as a member of the Kokoroza, a theatrical company created by kabuki and stage actors as an effort to create a more modern version of traditional Japanese theater. One of its members was Tomoyoshi Murayama, and Saburō Moroi assisted with the music.

After graduation, Kon obtained part-time jobs at a number of literary magazines, including Bungei Shuto and Bungakukai, providing essays, translations of André Gide, and literary criticism. He was hired as a lecturer by Meiji University in 1932. However, he quit in 1935 to devote his attentions to the direct the movie Dancing Girl of the Peninsula (Hanto no Maihime), starring Choi Seung-hee at the new Shinkō Kinema. He also wrote the screenplay for the movie. Kon visited Paris for half of 1937, and returned to his former position at Meiji University in 1939. During the Second Sino-Japanese War, he maintained a correspondence with Mu Shiying, a Chinese writer who hoped that cultural exchange would help bring peace to Asia.

In November 1941, Kon was drafted into the Imperial Japanese Army; however, the army recognized his talents and assigned him to the press corps in Japanese-occupied Philippines. He returned to Japan once on leave, but was sent back to the Philippines in December 1944. Eight days after his arrival, the situation quickly turned sour for the Japanese forces as American forces began their landings. Kon hid in the mountains of Luzon for five months with several narrow escapes from death in combat while reporting on the fleeing Imperial Japanese Army. He escaped the Philippines on a jury-rigged Type 100 Command Reconnaissance Aircraft to Taiwan, and was flying in a DC-3 from Taipei to Fukuoka when word came of the surrender of Japan.

== Literary career ==
While serving as director of the art department within the Ministry of Education from 1945 to 1946, Kon created the Japan Arts Festival, now an annual event for the promotion of cultural activities, especially Japanese literature. In 1946, Kon returned to Manila again, this time as a witness for the war crimes trial of Lieutenant General Masaharu Homma.

In 1949, Kon published Sanchu Horo ("Wandering in the Mountains"), a story based on his wartime experiences in the Philippines, which marked the start of his literary career. He received the Naoki Prize for his short story, Tenno no Boshi ("The Emperor's Hat") in 1950.

Kon's other biographical works include Miki Kiyoshi ni Okeru Ningen no Kenkyu, a fictional biography of the philosopher Miki Kiyoshi, and Yoshida Shigeru, about the life of the post-war Prime Minister of Japan. He lost his sight in one eye due to retinal detachment in 1966.

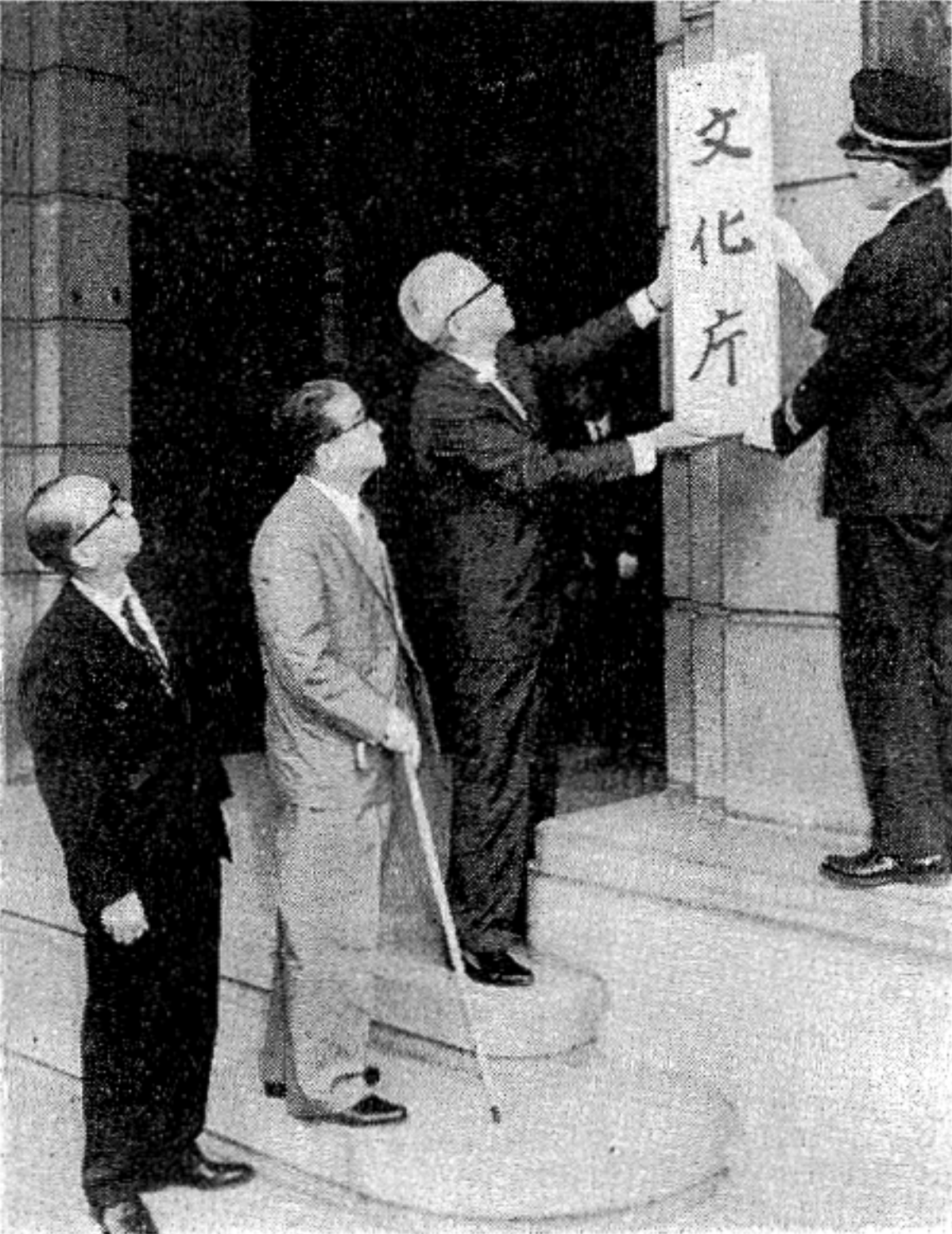
Kon (second from left) attending the opening ceremony in 1968.

In June 1968, Prime Minister Eisaku Satō asked Kon to accept the newly created position of Director of the Agency for Cultural Affairs. He served in this position for four years. From October 1972, he was also chairman of the Japan Foundation, a post which he held for eight years. During this time, his achievements included organizing an exhibition of art works from the Louvre in France, including the Mona Lisa, in return for an exhibition of the treasures of Tōshōdai-ji in Paris.

Kon was awarded the Grand Cordon of the Order of the Sacred Treasures in 1974. In 1978, the Japanese government designated him a Person of Cultural Merit. He was also made honorary director of the National Theatre of Japan in 1980.

Kon moved to Kamakura, Kanagawa Prefecture around 1931. After a temporary move to Tokyo after World War II, he returned to Kamakura, where he lived from 1951 until his death in 1984 at the age of 81. His grave is at the Catholic Cemetery in Kamakura.

== See also ==
- Japanese literature
- List of Japanese authors
