= Makoto Moroi =

Japanese composer

- Born: 17 December 1930; Tokyo, Japan
- Died: 2 September 2013 (aged 82)
- Other name: 諸井 誠
- Occupation: composer
- Relatives: father: Saburo Moroi (composer)

Makoto Moroi (諸井 誠, Moroi Makoto) (17 December 1930 – 2 September 2013) was a Japanese composer.

== Biography ==
Makoto Moroi was born in Tokyō, and is the son of Saburō Moroi. He studied composition with Tomojirō Ikenouchi at the Tokyo National University of Fine Arts and Music, graduating in 1952. He also studied Gregorian chant privately with Paul Anouilh, and Renaissance and Baroque music with Eta Harich-Schneider. He was one of the leading composers who introduced Japanese audiences to new musical styles and devices, including twelve-tone technique, serialism, and aleatory music. He was one of the first Japanese composers to embrace electronic music, and also introduced traditional Japanese instruments like the shakuhachi into his compositions. He died, aged 82, on 2 September 2013.

== List of works ==
=== Opera ===
- 1959 – The Stars of Pythagoras
- 1960 – Red Cocoon
- 1961 – Die lange, lange Strasse lange
- 1962 – Yamauba
- 1965 – Phaeton the charioteer

=== Choral ===
- 1959 – Chamber Cantata No. 1
- 1959 – Chamber Cantata No. 2
- 1970 – Izumo, my home
- 1972 – A romance of playing cards

=== Orchestral ===
- 1953 – Composition No. 1
- 1958 – Composition No. 2
- 1958 – Composition No. 3
- 1960 – Composition No. 4
- 1961 – Ode to Schoenberg
- 1966 – The Vision of Cain, symphonic sketch
- 1968 – Symphony

=== Concertante ===
- 1963 – Suite concertante for violin and orchestra
- 1964 – Toccata, Sarabande and Tarantella for piano and double string orchestra
- 1966 – Piano Concerto No. 1
- 1968 – Three Movements for shakuhachi, strings and percussion
- 1971 – Piano Concerto No. 2
- 1973 – Kyoso Symphony, for folk instruments and orchestra

=== Chamber ===
- 1950 – Chamber Music No. 1
- 1950 – Chamber Music No. 2
- 1951 – Chamber Music No. 3
- 1954 – Chamber Music No. 4
- 1962 – Five Epigramms
- 1966 – Five conversations for two shakuhachi
- 1967 – Five metamorphic strata
- 1972 – Contradiction
- 1972 – Contradiction II
- 1976 – Hanafuda denki

=== Instrumental ===
- 1951 – Sonata da camera for piano
- 1952 – Partita for flute
- 1954 – Alpha and Beta, for piano
- 1964 – Five pieces for shakuhachi
- 1967 – Eight parables for piano
- 1970 – Les farces, for violin
- 1972 – Sinfonia for S.M., for sanjugen
- 1978 – Fantasie and Fugue for organ

=== Tape ===
- 1956 – Seven variations (collaboration with Toshiro Mayuzumi)
- 1958 – Transfiguration
- 1962 – Variété
- 1968 – Small confession
