= Chūya Nakahara =

Japanese symbolist poet

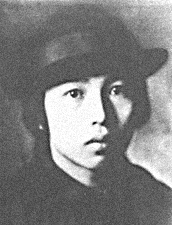
- Chūya Nakahara at age 18, circa 1925.
- Born: Chūya Kashimura; 29 April 1907; Yamaguchi, Japan
- Died: 22 October 1937 (aged 30); Kanagawa, Japan
- Occupation: Writer
- Spouse: Takako Ueno (m. 1933)
- Children: 2
- Writing career
- Genre: Poetry
- Notable works: Poems of the Goat (1934); Poems of Bygone Days (1938)
- Movements: Symbolism, Dadaism

Japanese name
- Kanji: 中原 中也
- Hiragana: なかはらちゅうや
Transcriptions
- Romanization: Nakahara Chūya

Chūya Nakahara (中原 中也, Nakahara Chūya; 29 April 1907 – 22 October 1937), born Chūya Kashimura (柏村 中也, Kashimura Chūya), was a Japanese poet active during the early Shōwa period. Originally shaped by Dada and other forms of European (mainly French) experimental poetry, he was one of the leading renovators of Japanese poetry. Although he died at the young age of 30, he wrote more than 350 poems throughout his life. Many called him the "Japanese Rimbaud" for his affinities with the French poet whose poems he translated in 1934.

== Early life ==
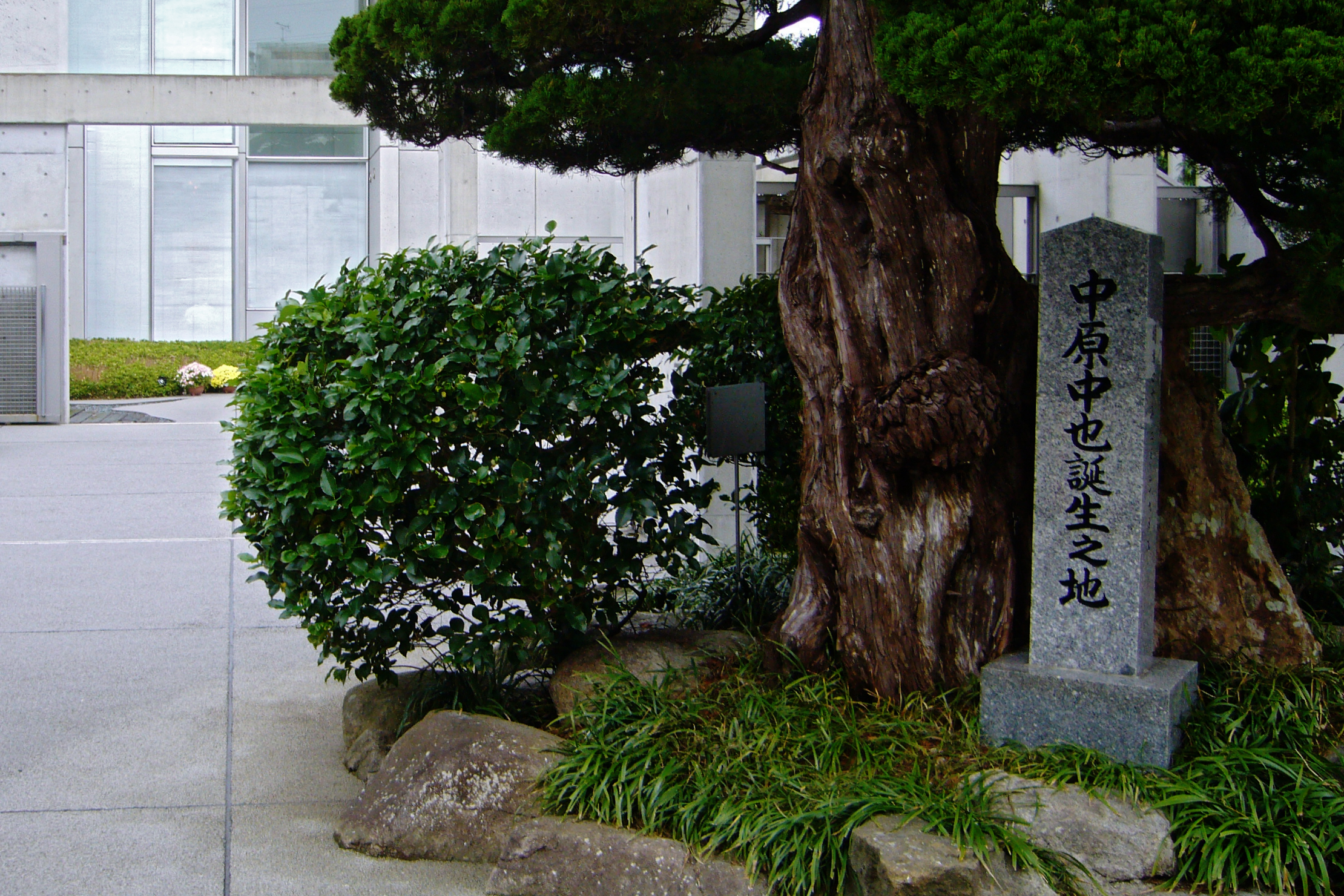
Nakahara Chūya Memorial Hall. © 2006 Oilstreet

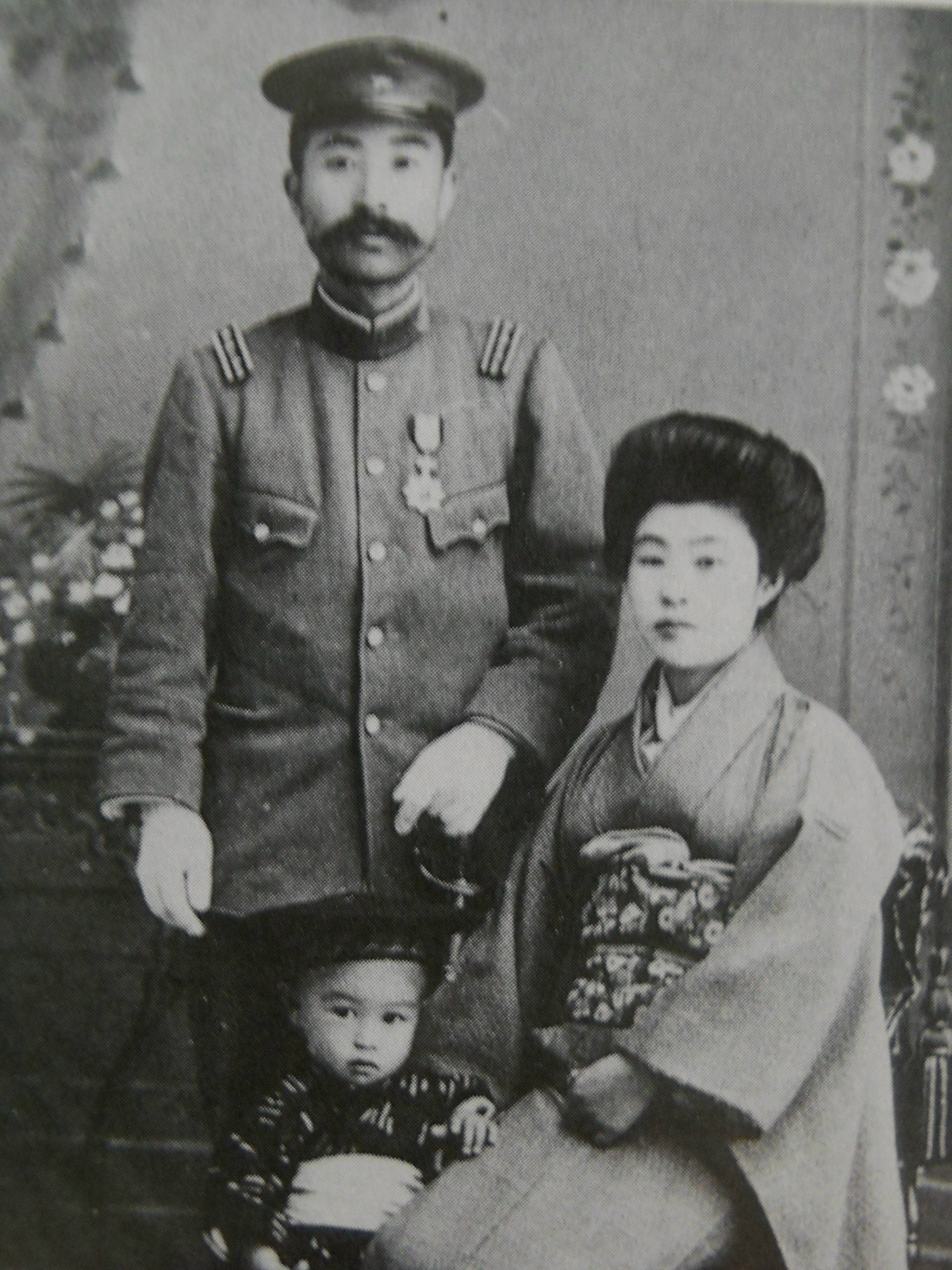
Chūya with his parents

Chūya Nakahara was born in Yamaguchi, where his father, Kensuke Kashimura, was a highly decorated army doctor. Kensuke married Fuku Nakahara and was adopted by the Nakahara family shortly after the birth of their son, officially changing their last name to Nakahara. In Nakahara's earliest years, his father was sent to Hiroshima and Kanazawa where the family followed, only returning to Yamaguchi in 1914. In 1917, Kensuke established his own clinic in the location where nowadays stands the Nakahara Chūya Memorial Hall.

Since his parents had not been able to have children for six years after their marriage, and because they had no children in the Nakahara family's hometown, they were delighted with the birth of their first son and celebrated it for three days.

== Education and literary beginnings ==
As the eldest son of a prominent doctor, Nakahara was expected to become one himself. Due to the high expectations of his father, Nakahara was given a very strict education, which also prevented him from enjoying an ordinary childhood. Worried about the public morals of the town, Kensuke forbid his son from playing outside with children from a different class to their own. Another example of these restrictions is that, unlike his younger brothers, he was not allowed to bathe in the river for fear that he would drown. As he grew up, severe punishments were inflicted upon him; a common one was being made to stand upright facing the wall. Any sudden move would cause to receive a burn on the heel with a cigarette ember. However, the biggest punishment was being confined to sleep in the barn, which Chūya received dozens of times compared to his brothers. This was intended to prepare him to follow Kensuke's footsteps and to become the head of the family.

As a middle schooler, Nakahara had excellent grades and was called a prodigy child. It was the death of his younger brother Tsugurō in 1915 when he was 8 years old, which awakened him to literature. Grief-driven, he turned to compose poetry. He submitted his first three verses to a women's magazine and local newspaper in 1920 when he was still in elementary school. In the same year, he passed the entrance examination to Yamaguchi Junior High School with brilliant results. It was from this point onwards that he started to rebel against his father's strictness. He no longer studied and his grades began to drop as he became increasingly absorbed by literature. Kensuke was extremely afraid of the influence of literature on his son. Once, having found a work of fiction Nakahara had hidden, he severely scolded him and, once again, confined him in the barn. It was around this time when Nakahara also began to drink and smoke, making his grades go even lower.

In 1923, he failed his third-year examination. It is said that Nakahara invited a friend to his study room, broke the answer sheet, and chanted "hurrah". The failure seems to have been deliberate. For as long as he did not fail, he was bound to remain under his strict parents' surveillance. On the other hand, Kensuke received the news with utter shock at what meant to him a deep humiliation. He resorted once more to striking his son and keeping him in the barn on the cold night of March. Regardless of this, Nakahara insisted on not going back to this school. This culminated in his father's defeat, ultimately leading to an apology for his “educational policy”. In light of these events, he was transferred to the Ritsumeikan Middle School in Kyoto, where Nakahara begin to live alone but still, and until the end of his days, at the expense of his family.

In Kyoto he found many of the influences that would ultimately shape him as a poet. He read Shinkichi Takahashi's Dadaist poetry, which inspired him to starting to write again. This artistic movement became a part of his poetic lifestyle and later earned him the nickname “Dada-san”. In winter he met the actress Yasuko Hasegawa, three years his senior, and in April 1924 they began living together. It is also in this very year that Chūya became friends with fellow poet Tominaga Tarō. After completing Junior High School, Chūya and Yasuko decided to follow Tominaga to Tokyo, on the basis of attending university there. As he was unable to take the exam due to a lack of documents or being late, he was sent out by his family on the condition that he would go to a preparatory school instead.

After dropping the preparatory course in 1926, of which his parents were not informed, he started studying French at the Athénée Français.

== Literary career ==
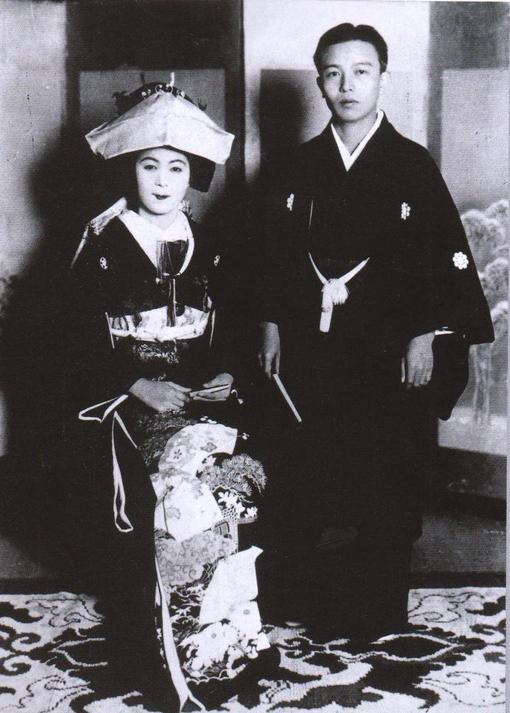
Nakahara Chūya and Takako Ueno married in 1933

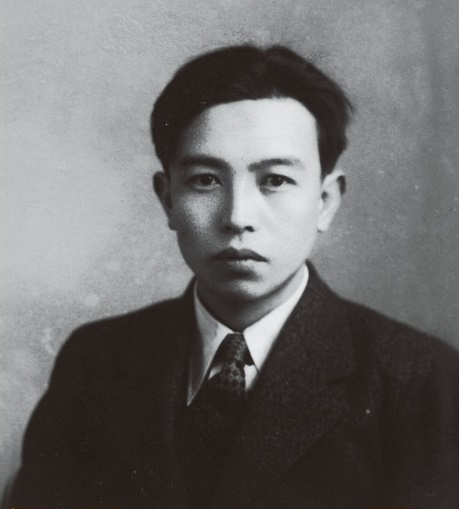
Nakahara Chūya in 1936

His verse has been considered somewhat obscure, and confessional and gives a general impression of pain and melancholy, emotions which were a constant throughout the poet's life.
Initially, Nakahara favored poetry in the Japanese traditional tanka format, but he was later (in his teens) attracted to the modern free verse styles advocated by the Dadaist poet Takahashi Shinkichi and by Tominaga Tarō. After he moved to Tokyo, he met Kawakami Tetsutaro and Shōhei Ōoka, with whom he began publishing a poetry journal, Hakuchigun (Group of Idiots). He was befriended by the influential literary critic Kobayashi Hideo, who introduced him to the French symbolist poets Arthur Rimbaud and Paul Verlaine, whose poems he translated into Japanese. The influence of Rimbaud went beyond just his poetry, and Nakahara came to be known for his "bohemian" lifestyle.

Nakahara adapted the traditional counts of five and seven used in Japanese haiku and tanka, but frequently tripped these counts with variations, in order to obtain a rhythmical, musical effect. Several of his poems were used as lyrics in songs, so this musical effect may have been carefully calculated from the start. Nakahara displayed different emotions in his poems, which according to Rachel Dumas was often “confusion, ennui, anger, gloom, and apathy”. In some of his poems he talks about being alone and how life is filled with darkness. He often expressed a childlike wonder about humans and how they connect with the world that lays outside of our minds. Nakahara, having been raised in a prefecture that was predominately Christian, often questioned faith in his poems. In his poems, he posed questions about the spiritual world and that of the other, a world that humans can’t attain. Chūya's works were rejected by many publishers, and he found acceptance primarily with the smaller literary magazines, including Yamamayu, which he launched together with Hideo Kobayashi, (although on occasion Shiki and Bungakukai would condescend to publish one of his works). He remained close friends with Kobayashi all of his life, despite the fact that in November 1925 Yasuko Hasegawa left Nakahara and began living with Kobayashi Hideo instead. This event took place right after the loss of his friend Tominaga. In December 1927, he met composer Saburō Moroi, who later adapted a number of his verses to music, such as Asa no Uta (朝の歌, "Morning Song") and Rinjū (臨終, "Deathbed"). In April 1931, Chūya was admitted to the Tokyo Foreign Language College in Kanda to study the French language, where he remained until March 1933.

Nakahara married Takako Ueno (a distant relative) in December 1933, and his first son, Fumiya, was born in October 1934. However, the death of his son in November 1936, due to tuberculosis, sent him into a nervous breakdown. Nakahara never fully recovered from this, despite the birth of his second son in December. Many of his later poems seem like remembrances and attempts to mitigate this enormous pain.

Nakahara was hospitalized in Chiba sanatorium in January 1937. In February, he was released and moved back to Kamakura, as he could not stand to continue living in the house which contained the memories of Fumiya. He left a number of his works with Kobayashi and was making plans to return to his hometown of Yamaguchi when he died in October 1937, at the age of 30, of tubercular meningitis. Shortly after, his second son died of the same illness. His grave is in his hometown of Yamaguchi. This is the very family grave that appears in his uncollected poem "Cicadas" (蟬, Semi).

== Legacy ==
Only one of his poetry anthologies, Yagi no Uta (山羊の歌, "Goat Songs", 1934) was published while he was alive (in a self-financed edition of two hundred copies). He edited a second collection, Arishi Hi no Uta (在りし日の歌, "Songs of Bygone Days", 1938) just before his death. During his lifetime, Nakahara was not counted among the mainstream poets. However, the emotional and lyrical nature of his verses has a wide and increasing following even to this day, especially among young people. Nakahara is now a subject of classroom study in Japanese schools, and his portrait in a hat with a vacant stare is well known. Kobayashi Hideo, to whom Nakahara entrusted the manuscript for Arishi Hi no Uta on his deathbed, was responsible for the posthumous promotion of his works. So was Ooka Shohei for collecting and editing The Complete Works of Nakahara Chūya, a collection containing the poet's uncollected poems, his journals, and many letters.

- The Nakahara Chūya Prize was established in 1996 by Yamaguchi city (with the support of publishers Seidosha and Kadokawa Shoten) in Chūya's memory. The award is presented annually to an outstanding collection of contemporary poetry characterized by a "fresh sensibility" (shinsen na kankaku). The winner receives a cash award of 1 million yen, and for several years, the winning collection was also published in an English language translation, but in recent years, the administrations of the award have stopped translating the winner.
- The acid-folk singer Kazuki Tomokawa recorded two albums entitled Ore no Uchide Nariymanai Uta and Nakahara Chuya Sakuhinnshu, using Nakahara's poems as lyrics.

== See also ==
- Japanese literature
- List of Japanese authors
