= Lemon (short story) =

- Short story by Motojirō Kajii
- Original title: 檸檬
- Translator: Kenneth Traynor, Chinatsu Komori
- Country: Japan
- Language: Japanese
- Genre(s): I-novel

Publication
- Publisher: Self-published
- Publication date: 1925

"Lemon" (Japanese: 檸檬, Hepburn: Remon) is a collection of short stories by Japanese author Motojirō Kajii. "Lemon" was written in 1924 and was published as Kajii's first doujinshi. It was a 28-page handmade book: 4.25" x 5.5", staple-bound. The interior was color printed, with several high quality black-and-white photographs. The cover had a spine and a full color photograph on the front.

"Lemon" is one of Kajii's few works to have been translated into English. Although he was a relatively unknown writer during his short lifetime who published in a few literary magazines, Kajii's poetic short stories are recognized today as masterpieces in Japan. The eponymous story "Lemon" is known as his representative work.

== Plot ==
The protagonist, who has diseased lungs, is tormented by strange anxiety all the time. He lost his interest in the stationery store Maruzen, music, and poetry that he had been interested in before. He only continues walking around aimlessly in Kyoto.

In one such incident, he visits a fruit shop he likes on a regular basis through Teramachi, the Kyoto Miyako Naka-ku (八百卯, Eight Hundred Rabbit", closed January 25, 2009). There were rare lemons placed side by side. He bought one lemon he was interested in; the coldness of the fruit in his hand was just right. After that, he felt uncomfortable, and even though he stopped by his favorite shop, Maruzen, he began feeling uneasy.

He felt an unchanged feeling of dissatisfaction, even though he looked at the usual picture albums that he used to like. He put the lemon on the pile of illustrations. Then he imagines lemon as a time bomb, and the works of fine art flying out of the Maruzen shop. He enjoys the excitement of the idea of blasting a lemon as a time bomb.

He was satisfied with what he had done in the end.

== Interpretation ==
This short story describes the feeling of an ailing patient and the mischievous emotions that every person has. Kajii wrote many other works that had a main character with lung disease because the author was affected by tuberculosis himself. His life was a fight against poverty and sickness (he died from tuberculosis at the age of 31).

Maruzen was still near Sanjodori, Huyachotori in Kyoto at that time. After "Lemon" was published, it is said there was no end to people who continued leaving a lemon at the Maruzen store in Kyoto (closed in October 2005).

This work inspired a character in the anime Bungo Stray Dogs. The character's name is the same as the author's, and the character likes blowing people up with lemon-shaped bombs. The character himself is immune to them, however.
