= Maruzen-Yushodo =

Japanese publishing company

MARUZEN-YUSHODO Company, Limited
- Native name: 丸善雄松堂株式会社
- Company type: Kabushiki gaisha
- Traded as: TYO: 8236
- Industry: Retail
- Founded: May 3, 1894; 132 years ago
- Headquarters: 28-23 Shinkawa 1-chome, Chūō-ku, Tokyo 104-0033; Tokyo Daiya Building No. 5, Tokyo, Japan
- Key people: 代表取締役社長 矢野正也, 早矢仕有的
- Products: Educational and Academic; Publication Business; Store interior
- Revenue: 655 million yen (2023)
- Net income: 373 million yen (2023)
- Total assets: 27,256 million yen (2023)
- Owner: 丸善CHIホールディングス 100%
- Number of employees: 340 full-time; 3200 temporary (2023)
- Subsidiaries: Daiichi Steel Works 100.0%; Editing Engineering Research Institute 51.1%; Yushodo Building 97.5%
- Website: https://yushodo.maruzen.co.jp/

Maruzen-Yushodo Company, Limited (丸善雄松堂株式会社, Maruzen-Yushodo Kabushiki-gaisha) is a major Japanese publisher and specialized trading company. It handles various businesses, including the construction and interior design of cultural facilities and outsourcing library services. It is a wholly owned subsidiary of Maruzen CHI Holdings, a subsidiary of Dai Nippon Printing.

Its registered head office is in Nihonbashi 2-chome (Nihonbashi Maruzen Tokyu Building), Chūō-ku, Tokyo, and its head office is in Shinkawa 1-chome, Chūō-ku.

It is unrelated to the former Maruzen Oil (later Cosmo Oil) which uses the name Maruzen or Maruzen, Maruzen, a manufacturer of delicacies such as "Cheekama," Maruzen, a manufacturer of commercial kitchen equipment, Maruzen, an airsoft gun manufacturer, and Carport Maruzen, a car accessory store.

== Corporate history ==
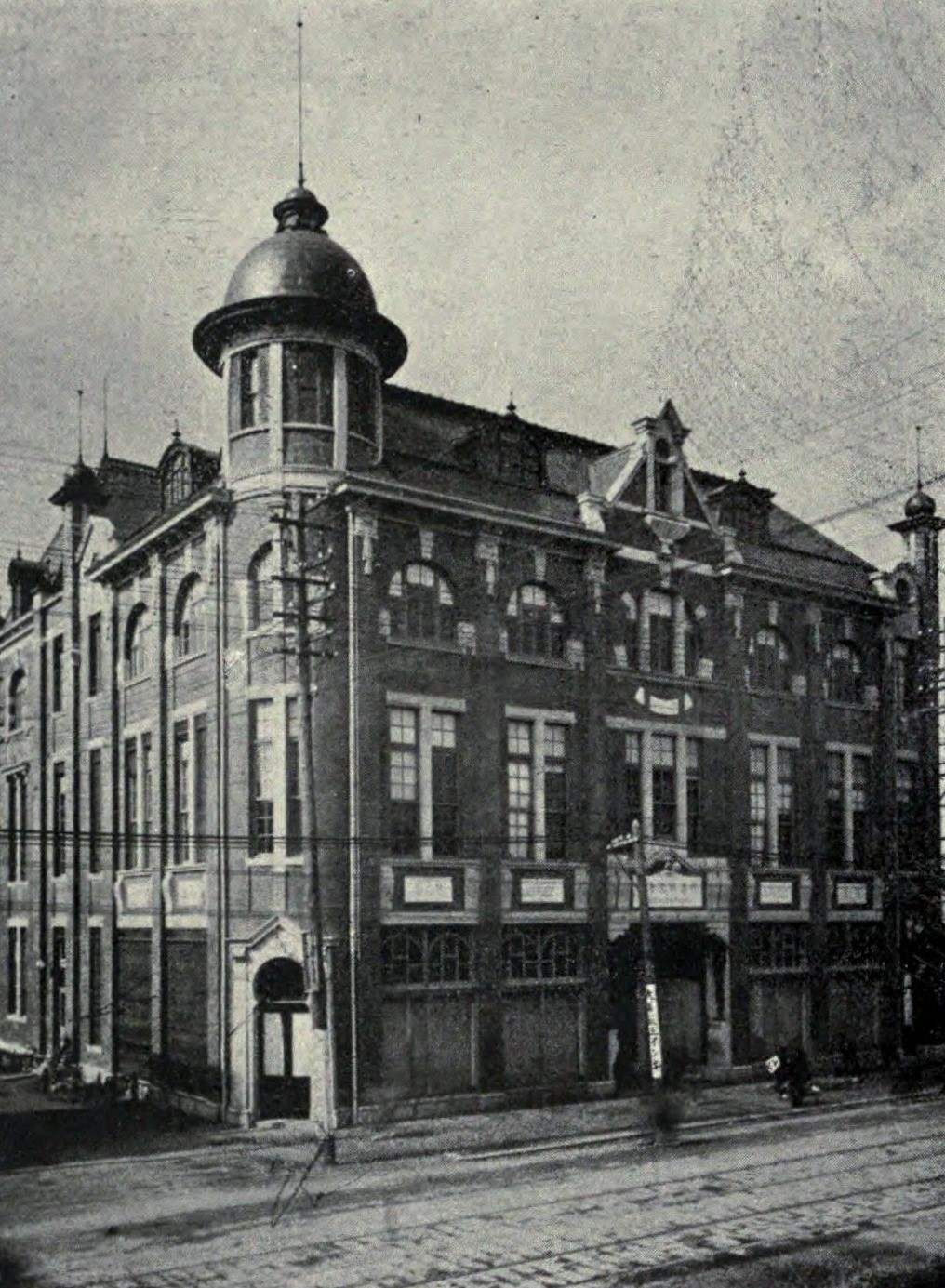
Maruzen in the Meiji period

=== Founding ===
The company was founded on January 1, 1869. The company's name at the time of its founding was "Maruya Shosha" and the fictitious character "Maruya Zenpachi" was listed as its representative in the company's registry, leading to the name Maruzen. The first store in Nihonbashi was called "Maruya Zenshichi Store (English name Z.P.Maruya & Co.Ltd.)". The founder was Hayashi Yuteki, a disciple of Fukuzawa Yukichi. According to Wadagaki Kenzo, Hayashi chose the name after consultation with Fukuzawa. The company was initially named "球善" (Maruzen), using the Chinese character "球" (meaning "sphere") from the word for "globe" (地球), and it was said to mean that the import and sale of Western books is a way of seeking knowledge from around the world. From the time of its establishment, Maruzen was known as Japan's first modern company, having abandoned the business practice of hereditary succession at the time and separating ownership and management. Maruzen contributed to the introduction of Western culture and academia in modern Japan, and the ethos cultivated by the products it introduced was called "Maruzen culture" and was beloved by many intellectuals. In addition to bookstores, the company also handled a wide range of products, from academic information to clothing, luxury stationery, and architecture, and the trading company nature of the company from its founding remains to this day. In 1947, Tsukasa Tadashi became president and declared an autocratic dictatorship.

=== Recent restructuring ===
In the 1990s, Maruzen's management deteriorated, and the company's shares, listed on the First Section of the Tokyo Stock Exchange, became speculative stocks. In 1999, the company was involved in the Princeton Bonds scandal, and recorded a large special loss of 5.6 billion yen.

In September 2004, the company opened a flagship store, the Marunouchi Main Store, at Marunouchi Oazo to replace the old Nihonbashi store, and closed the Nihonbashi store for a time and rebuilt it. On August 3, 2005, the business restructuring plan submitted to the Ministry of Economy, Trade and Industry based on the Industrial Revitalization Act was approved, and the company was granted a reduction in registration and license taxes. The following day, on August 4, Daiwa Securities SMBC Principal Investments invested 100 billion yen, making the company the largest shareholder with 21.66%, and began implementing the restructuring plan. On August 3, 2007, the company entered into a capital and business alliance with Dai Nippon Printing (DNP). On the 10th of the same month, Daiwa Securities SMBC Principal Investments transferred shares to Maruzen Co., Ltd., and Junkudo Bookstore Co., Ltd., and the company was subsequently granted third-party allotments on May 13 and August 20, 2008, making the company a subsidiary of Dai Nippon Printing.

In September 2009, Dai Nippon Printing announced in a press release that Maruzen Co., Ltd., Toshokan Ryutsu Center Co., Ltd., and Junkudo Bookstore Co., Ltd., would merge under Dai Nippon Printing's investment. On February 1, 2010, Maruzen and Toshokan Ryutsu Center established a holding company, CHI Group Co., Ltd., and merged through a stock transfer. As a result, Maruzen was delisted, and CHI Group was newly listed instead. In August 2010, the store management division was spun off to establish Maruzen Bookstore Co., Ltd. In February 2011, Junkudo Bookstore and Maruzen Bookstore became subsidiaries of the CHI Group. The publishing division was spun off to establish Maruzen Publishing Co., Ltd., which became a wholly owned subsidiary of the CHI Group on the same day. In May 2011, the CHI Group changed its name to Maruzen CHI Holdings Co., Ltd. In February 2015, Maruzen Bookstore absorbed Junkudo Bookstore and changed its name to Maruzen Junkudo Bookstore Co., Ltd. On February 1, 2016, Maruzen Co., Ltd. absorbed Yushodo Bookstore and changed its name to Maruzen-Yushodo Co., Ltd.

=== Partnerships ===
In 2004, after integrating its IT subsidiaries, it entered into a capital and business partnership with Kyocera Communication Systems, established a new company, Kyocera Maruzen System Integration (KMSI), and invested 27.3% in it (Kyocera Communication Systems absorbed it in 2016).

On June 26, 2007, it signed a contract with Amazon.co.jp to operate a joint online store brand, and on August 28, it transferred the online bookstore function to Amazon.co.jp, and called it the "Maruzen Online Store." It ended on December 31, 2010.

On January 30, 2008, it entered into a business partnership with AM/PM Japan Co., Ltd., which operates the convenience store chain ampm. In April, it opened a new store type, the "Maruzen Campus Shop," on the campus of Yamanashi Gakuin University and Yamanashi Gakuin Junior College. It has since expanded to other universities and locations.

== Maruzen's main stores ==
The Nihonbashi store (in the Nihonbashi Maruzen Tokyu Building) was Maruzen's original (registered) head office. It was directly connected to the Nihonbashi subway station. Maruzen's first store opened in 1870. It closed temporarily in October 2004 for reconstruction and reopened on March 9, 2007, after redevelopment by Tokyu Real Estate.

The Sakae, Nagoya store (in the Maruzen Nagoya Building) opened in 1874. This was the company's flagship store in the Chubu region since its early days. It was closed on June 24, 2012, due to the reconstruction of the building it occupied, which was owned by an affiliate of Tokyo Tatemono. It moved to the 6th and 7th floors of the adjacent Maruei building across the street and reopened in September of the same year. It also moved into a new building in the Sakae district that Heiwa Real Estate built in 2015. The new Nagoya main store began operations on April 28, 2015. The previous store in Maruei continued to operate as the "Nagoya Sakae store", but the company closed the 7th floor on November 23, 2015, and the 6th floor on December 25, 2015, and announced its intention to withdraw from Maruei.

The store on Kawaramachi Street in Kyoto store (Nakagyo Ward, Kyoto City, closed) - The original store, located on Sanjo-dori Fuyacho, is the setting for Kajii Motojiro's novel "Lemon." The second store, located on Kawaramachi-dori Takoyakushiagaru, closed in October 2005. There used to be many bookstores in Kawaramachi-dori in Kyoto City, but in recent years, the number has been decreasing, and this is one of the trends in bookstore withdrawals. After the decision to close the store was made, many fans left lemons behind in honor of the novel, and sales of "Lemon" also increased sharply. Junkudo Bookstore, a bookstore in the same group, had opened in Kyoto BAL in Kawaramachi Sanjo, but reopened as Maruzen in 2015 when the facility was renovated.

The Shinsaibashi Sogo Store in Osaka closed on July 15, 2007. Its predecessor, the Osaka Shinsaibashi Store, opened in 1871 as the second store after the Tokyo Nihonbashi Store. In September 2005, it relocated to the reopening of the Sogo Shinsaibashi Main Store and expanded and reopened as the Osaka Shinsaibashi Sogo Store. In addition to a wide selection of specialized books such as art books and foreign books, it also handled high-end stationery and was the core of the Shinsaibashi-suji Shopping Street (11th and 12th floors of Sogo Shinsaibashi Main Store), which attracted highly specialized tenants aimed at the elderly. The reason for the withdrawal was not disclosed, but it is believed that the store was unable to attract customers as planned on the upper floors of the department store due to its limited product lineup, bringing an end to its 136-year history dating back to its predecessor, the Osaka Shinsaibashi store. On September 2 of the same year, after the store's withdrawal, Sanseido Bookstore opened as a successor, but it also closed down when the Sogo Shinsaibashi main store closed.

== Literary commemoratives ==
In 2009, to commemorate its 140th anniversary, the company released a limited edition fountain pen called "Lemon" which is packaged with the Shincho Bunko edition of "Lemon". It also released "Soseki", packaged with a facsimile of the handwritten manuscript of Kokoro, a reproduction of the Onoto that Natsume Sōseki received from Uchida Roan.

== Legacy ==
One of the theories about the origin of the name Hayashi rice is that it was a tribute to Maruzen's founder, Hayashi Masaru. In relation to this, Maruzen had Hayashi rice on the menu at the "Maruzen Restaurant" (formerly known as Golfers Snack, commonly known as Snack) on the rooftop of the former Nihonbashi main store, and currently sells "Hayashi beef" and "Hayashi pork" under the Maruzen brand name "Chubo Gaku" on the 4th floor of the Marunouchi main store and the 3rd floor of the Nihonbashi store.

== Scandal ==
The company declined an order from the National Art Center, Tokyo to operate a reference room there just before it was to begin (on March 29, 2013), and was subsequently suspended from purchasing books and other transactions with the National Museum of Art, an Independent Administrative Institution that operates the museum, for four months.
