= Hideo Kobayashi =

Japanese author

- 小林 秀雄
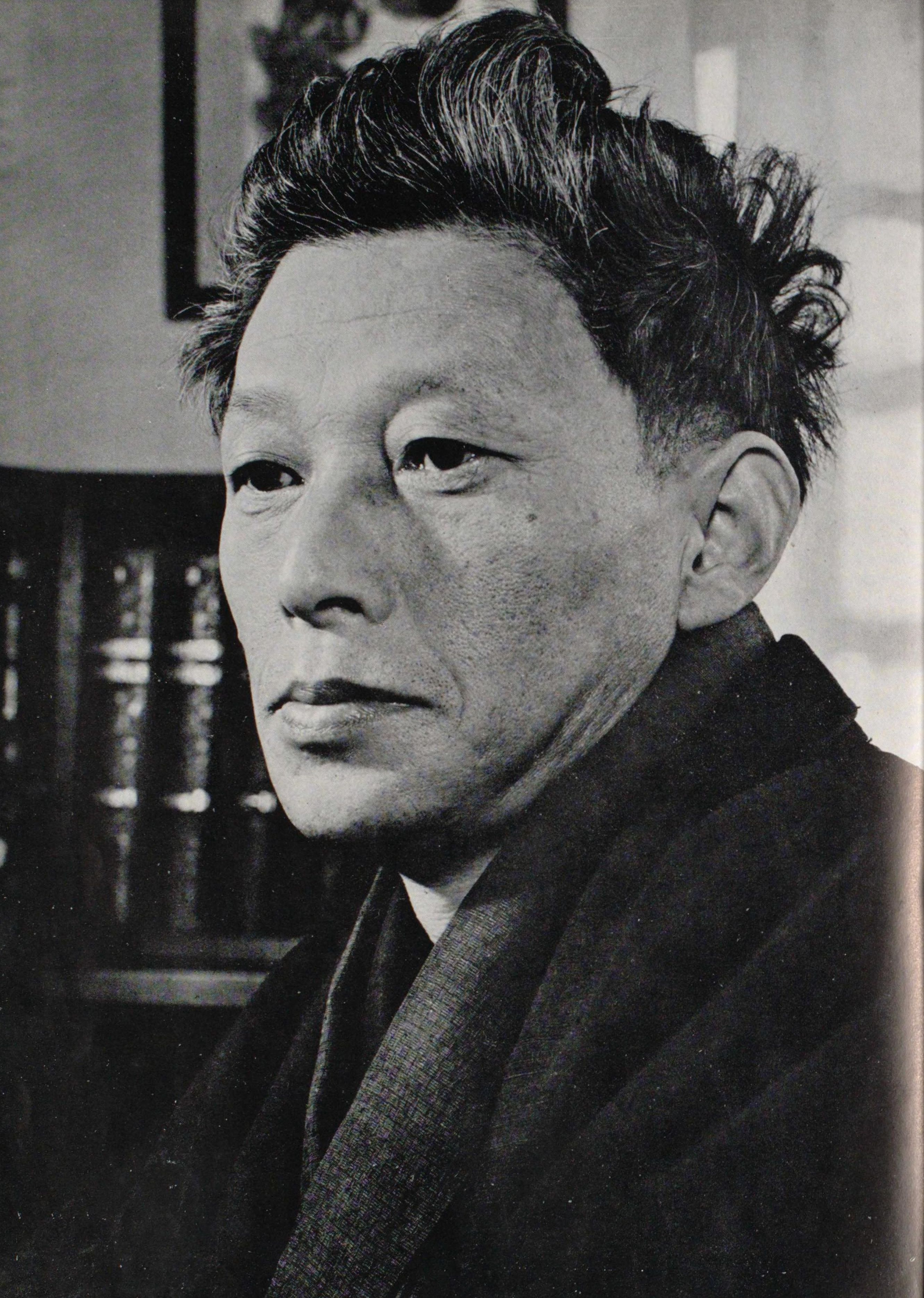
- Kobayashi in 1953
- Born: 11 April 1902; Tokyo, Japan
- Died: 1 March 1983 (aged 80); Kamakura, Kanagawa, Japan
- Resting place: Tōkei-ji, Kamakura, Japan
- Education: Tokyo Imperial University
- Occupation: Literary critic
- Writing career
- Language: Japanese
- Genre: literary criticism

Hideo Kobayashi (小林 秀雄, Kobayashi Hideo; April 11, 1902 – March 1, 1983) was a Japanese author, who established literary criticism as an independent art form in Japan.

== Early life ==
Kobayashi was born in the Kanda district of Tokyo, where his father was a noted engineer who introduced European diamond polishing technology to Japan, and who invented a ruby-based phonograph needle. Kobayashi studied French literature at Tokyo Imperial University, where his classmates included Hidemi Kon and Tatsuji Miyoshi. He met Chūya Nakahara in April 1925, with whom he quickly became close friends, but in November of the same year, began living together with Nakahara's former mistress, the actress Yasuko Hasegawa. Kobayashi graduated in March 1928, and soon after moved to Osaka for a few months before moving to Nara, where he stayed at the home of Naoya Shiga from May 1928. His relationship with Yasuko Hasegawa ended around this time. In September 1929, he submitted an article to a contest held by the literary journal Kaizō, and won second place.

== Literary critic ==
In the early 1930s Kobayashi was associated with the novelists Yasunari Kawabata and Riichi Yokomitsu and collaborated on articles for the literary journal Bungakukai and became editor in January 1935. At that time Kobayashi felt literature should be relevant to society, with writers and critics practicing social responsibilities. His editorials covered a wide range from contemporary literature to the classics, philosophy, and the arts. He began to serialize his life of Fyodor Dostoevsky in the magazine. Around this time, he also published Watakushi Shosetsu Ron, an attack on the popular Japanese literary genre of the shishosetsu, the autobiographical novel or I Novel. From April 1932, he was also working as a lecturer at Meiji University and was promoted to professor in June 1938.

By the mid-1930s, Kobayashi was well established as a literary critic. His aversion to abstract ideas, and conceptualizing in general, was widely known, as was his preference for spontaneity and intuition. In literature, he reserved his highest praise for the works of Kan Kikuchi and Naoya Shiga, whereas he expressed a low opinion of Ryūnosuke Akutagawa for being too cerebral.

He made Kamakura, Kanagawa prefecture his home from 1931 and was a central figure in local literary activity.

== Wartime propagandist ==
In politics, Kobayashi praised the writings of militant nationalist Shūmei Ōkawa. In November 1937, he wrote a strongly worded essay Senso ni tsuite ("On War"), which appeared in a leading intellectual magazine, Kaizō. In the essay, he lashed out at fellow writers and intellectuals who continued to oppose the growing war in China, sharply reminding them that their duty as subjects of the emperor took precedence over all else. It made little difference what the war is about, all that mattered was that it existed and must be dealt with. Kobayashi treated the war as if it were an act of nature, such as a storm, impervious to analysis and beyond human control. Just as a storm must be weathered, a war must be won, regardless of right or wrong.

Kobayashi went to China for the first time in March 1938 as a special correspondent for the popular magazine Bungeishunjū, and as a guest of the Imperial Japanese Army. This was the first of six wartime trips to the continent, which took him through Japanese-occupied areas of eastern and northern China. In 1940, together with Kan Kikuchi and fifty-two other writers including Kawabata Yasunari and Riichi Yokomitsu, Kobayashi toured Japan, Korea, and Manchukou as members of the Literary Home-Front Campaign (Bungei Jugo Undo), a speech-making troupe organized by Kikuchi to promote support for the war.

== Later career ==
Following the end of World War II, Kobayashi was sharply attacked by leftists for his collaboration with the Japanese military, but the US occupation authorities never filed any charges against him, and he was not even purged from public life. Kobayashi's reputation as a brilliant literary critic emerged from the war largely intact. He resigned from teaching at Meiji University in August 1946. An anthology of his works was awarded the Japan Art Academy Prize in 1951.

In the post-war period, Kobayashi started a business as an antique dealer (amassing a considerable collection of Japanese art in the process), traveled to Europe, wrote essays and gave lectures on a huge variety of subjects, made radio broadcasts, took part in dialogues with writers, artists and scientists, and wrote about golf. His Watashi no jinseikan ("My View of Life") and Kangaeru hinto ("Hints for Thinking") became bestsellers.

In 1958, Kobayashi was awarded the Noma Literary Prize for Kindai kaiga ("Modern Paintings"). Kobayashi became a member of the Japan Art Academy in 1959, and was awarded the Order of Culture by the Japanese government in 1967.

Kobayashi died of renal failure on March 1, 1983. His grave is at the temple of Tōkei-ji in Kamakura.

== Honours and awards ==
- 1953 - Yomiuri Prize
- 1958 - Noma Literary Prize
- 1959 - Japan Art Academy member
- 1963 - Person of Cultural Merit
- 1967 - Order of Culture

== Legacy ==
The Kobayashi Hideo Prize (Kobayashi Hideo Shō) was established in 2002 by the Shinchō Bungei Shinkō Kai (Shinchō Society for the Promotion of the Literary Arts). It is awarded annually to a work of nonfiction published in Japanese, between July 1 and the following June 30, that offers a fresh image of the world based on the demonstration of a free spirit and supple intellect. The winner receives a commemorative gift and a cash award of 1 million yen.

== See also ==
- Japanese literature
- List of Japanese authors
