= Tadashi Iijima =

- 飯島正
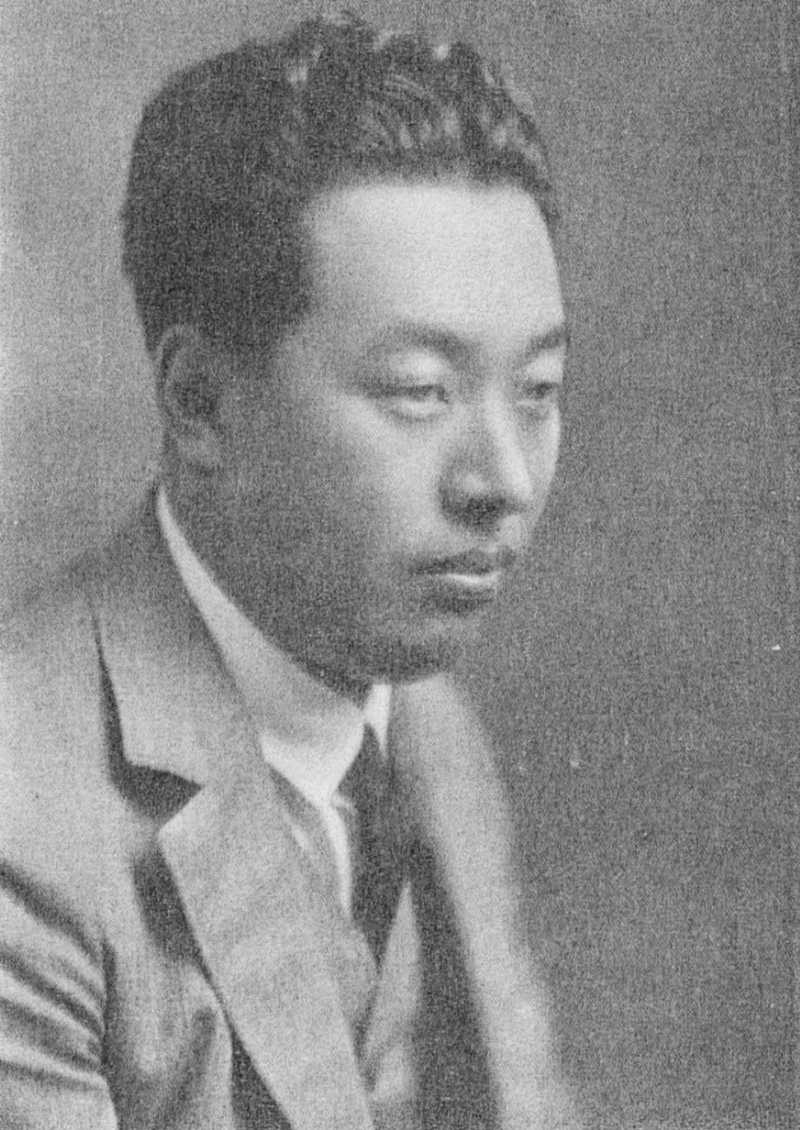
- Tadashi Iijima in 1929
- Born: 5 March 1902; Tokyo
- Died: 5 January 1996 (aged 93)
- Occupations: Film critic, screenwriter

Tadashi Iijima (飯島 正, Iijima Tadashi; 5 March 1902 – 5 January 1996) was a Japanese film critic and screenwriter. He has been called "a leader who established film criticism and film research in Japan".

== Career ==
After graduating from the Tokyo Prefectural First Middle School (now Hibiya High School), he attended the Third High School (later becoming part of Kyoto University), where he shared a room with Motojiro Kajii. Iijima had already begun publishing film criticism even before he graduated from the Department of French Literature at the University of Tokyo in 1929, joining the editorial board of Kinema Junpo in 1922. He published his first book, Shinema no ABC, in 1928, which included both his own theoretical writings and criticism as well as translations of French film theory. In addition to film criticism, he also helped edit literary journals and published novels, poetry, and theatrical plays. He even wrote screenplays for television dramas in the early years of the medium. His range of interests was broad, as he even studied Hungarian. He joined the faculty of Waseda University in 1946 and rose to professor in 1957. His book Zen'ei eiga riron to zen'ei geijutsu (1971) earned him a doctorate from Waseda.

== Awards ==
Iijima received the Minister of Culture award for criticism at the Geijutsu Senshō in 1970. In 1993, he received the 11th Kawakita Award, and at the 50th Mainichi Film Awards, he received a posthumous Special Award for his contributions to film criticism.
