= Othmar Mága =

German conductor (1929–2020)

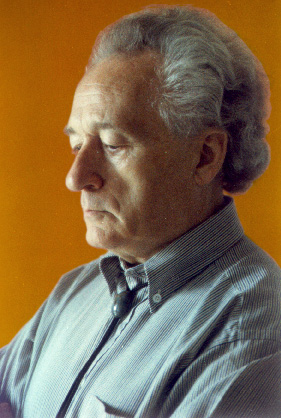
- Born: 30 June 1929; Brno, Czechoslovakia
- Died: 28 January 2020 (aged 90); Kiel, Germany
- Education: University of Stuttgart; University of Tübingen
- Occupations: Conductor; Academic teacher
- Organizations: Nürnberger Symphoniker; KBS Symphony Orchestra; Folkwang-Hochschule
- Website: www.othmar-maga.de

Othmar Mága (30 June 1929 – 28 January 2020) was a German conductor, who was chief conductor internationally, including the Odense Symphony Orchestra in Denmark and the KBS Symphony Orchestra in Korea. Among his many recordings are several rarely played concertos for instruments such as horn and double bass, including works of the 20th century.

== Life ==
Mága was born in 1929 in Brno, Czechoslovakia, to German-Hungarian parents. He studied violin, conducting and composing in Stuttgart (1948–52), and musicology and German literature at the University of Tübingen (1952–58). He studied conducting further, with Paul van Kempen (1954–55), Ferdinand Leitner (opera) and Sergiu Celibidache (1960–62).

Mága was chief conductor of the Göttinger Symphonie Orchester (1963–67) and of the Nürnberger Symphoniker (1968–70). He then became Generalmusikdirektor (GMD) of the Bochumer Symphoniker and professor at the Folkwang-Hochschule in Essen, where he taught to 1982. From 1983 until 1987, Mága was chief conductor of the Orchestra I Pomeriggi Musicali in Milan, then of the Odense Symphony Orchestra, and from 1992 until end of 1996 chief conductor of the KBS Symphony Orchestra, the orchestra of the Korean Broadcasting System. From 2002 until 2003 he was GMD of the Niederrheinische Sinfoniker at the Theater Krefeld und Mönchengladbach. Mága died in Kiel on 28 January 2020.

== Repertoire ==
After sixty years of conducting Mága's repertoire contained over 2000 works, music from the Renaissance to works by contemporary composers, including several operas.

=== Discography ===
- Bach: Harpsichord Concerto in D minor – Nürnberger Symphoniker (Polyband)
- Bach: Overture No. 2 – Nürnberger Symphoniker (Polyband)
- Beethoven: Die Ruinen von Athen – KBS Symphony Orchestra Seoul (Cheil-Orange)
- Beethoven: Triple Concerto – Nürnberger Symphoniker (Polyband)
- Beethoven: Violin Concerto – Nürnberger Symphoniker (Polyband)
- Berg: Symphonic Pieces from Lulu – Nürnberger Symphoniker (Colosseum)
- Bizet: Jeux d'enfants – Nürnberger Symphoniker (Polyband)
- Bizet: Symphony in C – Nürnberger Symphoniker (Polyband)
- Borodin: Symphony No. 2 – Philharmonia Hungarica (VOX)
- Borodin: Steppenskizze aus Mittelasien – Philharmonia Hungarica (VOX)
- Chabrier: España – KBS (Cheil-Orange)
- Debussy: Prélude à l'après-midi d'un faune – Bochumer Symphoniker (Stadt Bochum)
- Dvořák: Cello Concerto – Nürnberger Symphoniker (Intercord "Saphir")
- Dvořák: Overture Othello – KBS (Samsung-Classics)
- Oldrich Flosman: Horn Concerto – RSO Frankfurt (Audite)
- Harald Genzmer: Organ Concerto – Bochumer Symphoniker (VOX)
- Glazunov: Ballettszenen, Op. 52 – Bochumer Symphoniker (Impromptu)
- Glazunov: Die Jahreszeiten – Nürnberger Symphoniker (Colosseum)
- Glazunov: Raymonda – Bochumer Symphoniker (Impromptu)
- Glinka: Dances from Ein Leben für den Zaren – Bochumer Symphoniker (Impromptu)
- Handel: Feuerwerksmusik – Nürnberger Symphoniker (Colosseum und BASF)
- Adolf von Henselt: Piano Concerto – Philharmonia Hungarica (VOX)
- Henze: First Suite from Undine – Nürnberger Symphoniker (Polyband)
- Hindemith: Kammermusik Nr. 1 – Philharmonia Hungarica (FFE)
- Hindemith: Kammermusik Nr. 7 – Bochumer Symphoniker (Da Camera Magna)
- Hindemith: Konzertmusik, Op. 50 – Philharmonia Hungarica (FFE)
- Hindemith: Overture Neues vom Tage – WDR Sinfonieorchester Köln (FFE)
- Franz Anton Hoffmeister: Double Bass Concerto – RSO Frankfurt (FSM)
- Leopold Koželuch: Double Bass Concerto – RSO Frankfurt (FSM)
- Friedrich Kuhlau: Piano Concerto – Odense Symfoniorkest (Unicorn)
- Kuhlau: Concerto for Two Horns – Odense Symfoniorkest (Unicorn)
- Kuhlau: Overture Elverhöj – Odense Symfoniorkest (Unicorn)
- Anatoly Lyadov: Kikimora, Op. 63 – Bochumer Symphoniker (Impromptu)
- Theo Loevendie: De Nachtigal – Residentie Orkest den Haag (Colofon)
- Mahler: Adagio from Symphony No. 10 – Nürnberger Symphoniker (FFE)
- Francesco Malipiero: Piano Concerto No. 6 – Nürnberger Symphoniker (FFE)
- Mendelssohn: Antigone – RSO Frankfurt (Audite)
- Mendelssohn: Fingals Höhle – KBS (Cheil-Orange)
- Mendelssohn: Ein Sommernachtstraum – KBS (Samsung-Classics)
- Ignaz Moscheles: Piano Concerto in G minor – Michael Ponti, piano, Philharmonia Hungarica (VOX)
- Mozart: Piano Concertos Nos. 6 and 8 – Philharmonia Hungarica (VOX)
- Mozart: Concerto for Two Pianos – Nürnberger Symphoniker (Colosseum)
- Nielsen: Flute Concerto – Philharmonia Hungarica (VOX)
- Nielsen: Clarinet Concerto – Philharmonia Hungarica (VOX)
- Jiří Pauer: Horn Concerto (1957) – RSO Frankfurt (Audite)
- Poulenc: L'Histoire de Babar, le petit éléphant – Residentie Orkest den Haag (Colofon)
- Poulenc: Concerto for Two Pianos – Nürnberger Symphoniker (Colosseum)
- Prokofiev: Peter en de Wolf – Residentie Orkest den Haag (Colofon)
- Rimsky-Korsakoff: Overture Russische Themen – Bochumer Symphoniker (VOX)
- Rimsky-Korsakoff: Sadko – Bochumer Symphoniker (Impromptu)
- Rimsky-Korsakoff: Skazka – Bochumer Symphoniker (VOX)
- Rimsky-Korsakoff: Suite No. 2 – Bochumer Symphoniker (VOX)
- Anton Rubinstein: Piano Concerto No. 4 – Philharmonia Hungarica (VOX)
- Saint-Saens: Die Muse und der Poet – KBS (Cheil-Orange)
- Saint-Saens: Karneval der Tiere – Nürnberger Symphoniker (Intercord)
- Schumann: Symphony No. 3 – Bochumer Symphoniker (Stadt Bochum)
- Sibelius: Finlandia – KBS (Cheil-Orange)
- Smetana: Die Moldau – KBS (Cheil-Orange)
- Stravinsky: Dumbarton Oaks – Philharmonia Hungarica (FFE)
- Tchaikovsky: Der Sturm – Bochumer Symphoniker (VOX)
- Tchaikovsky: Der Sturm, Phantasie, Op. 18 – Bochumer Symphoniker (VOX)
- Tchaikovsky: Der Woywode – Bochumer Symphoniker (VOX)
- Tchaikovsky: Fatum – Bochumer Symphoniker (VOX)
- Tchaikovsky: Overture Romeo and Juliet – KBS (Samsung-Classics)
- Tcherepnin A.: Suite Der Abgrund – Nürnberger Symphoniker (Colosseum)
- Tcherepnin N.: Dances from Le Pavillon d'Armide – Nürnberger Symphoniker (Impromptu)
- Válek: Violin Concerto – FOK Prag (Supraphon)
- Giovanni Battista Viotti: Violin Concerto – Nürnberger Symphoniker (FEE und Bellaphon)
- Wladimir Vogel: Passacaglia – Nürnberger Symphoniker (FEE) OCLC 1073022960 and OCLC 1116823107
- Peter-Jan Wagemans: Romance for violin and orchestra – Residentie Orkest den Haag (Donemus) OCLC 605632516
- Weber: Symphony No. 1 – Nürnberger Symphoniker (Colosseum)
- Weber: Symphony No. 2 – Nürnberger Symphoniker (Colosseum)
- Anton Webern: Fünf Stücke. Op. 10 – Nürnberger Symphoniker (FFE)
- Webern: Sechs Stücke, Op. 6 – Nürnberger Symphoniker (FFE)
- Webern: Sinfonie, Op. 21 – Nürnberger Symphoniker (FFE)
