= KBS Symphony Orchestra =

Orchestra based in South Korea

- Orchestra
- Former name: National Symphony Orchestra of Korea (1969–1981)
- Founded: 1956; 69 years ago
- Location: Seoul, South Korea
- Concert hall: KBS Hall; Seoul Arts Center
- Principal conductor: Myung-whun Chung
- Website: Official website

- KBS Symphony Orchestra
- Hangul: KBS 교향악단
- Hanja: KBS 交響樂團
- RR: KBS gyohyangakdan
- MR: KBS kyohyangaktan

The KBS Symphony Orchestra (KBS 교향악단) is a symphony orchestra based in Seoul, South Korea. The orchestra principally performs in the KBS Hall and the concert hall of the Seoul Arts Center.

== History ==
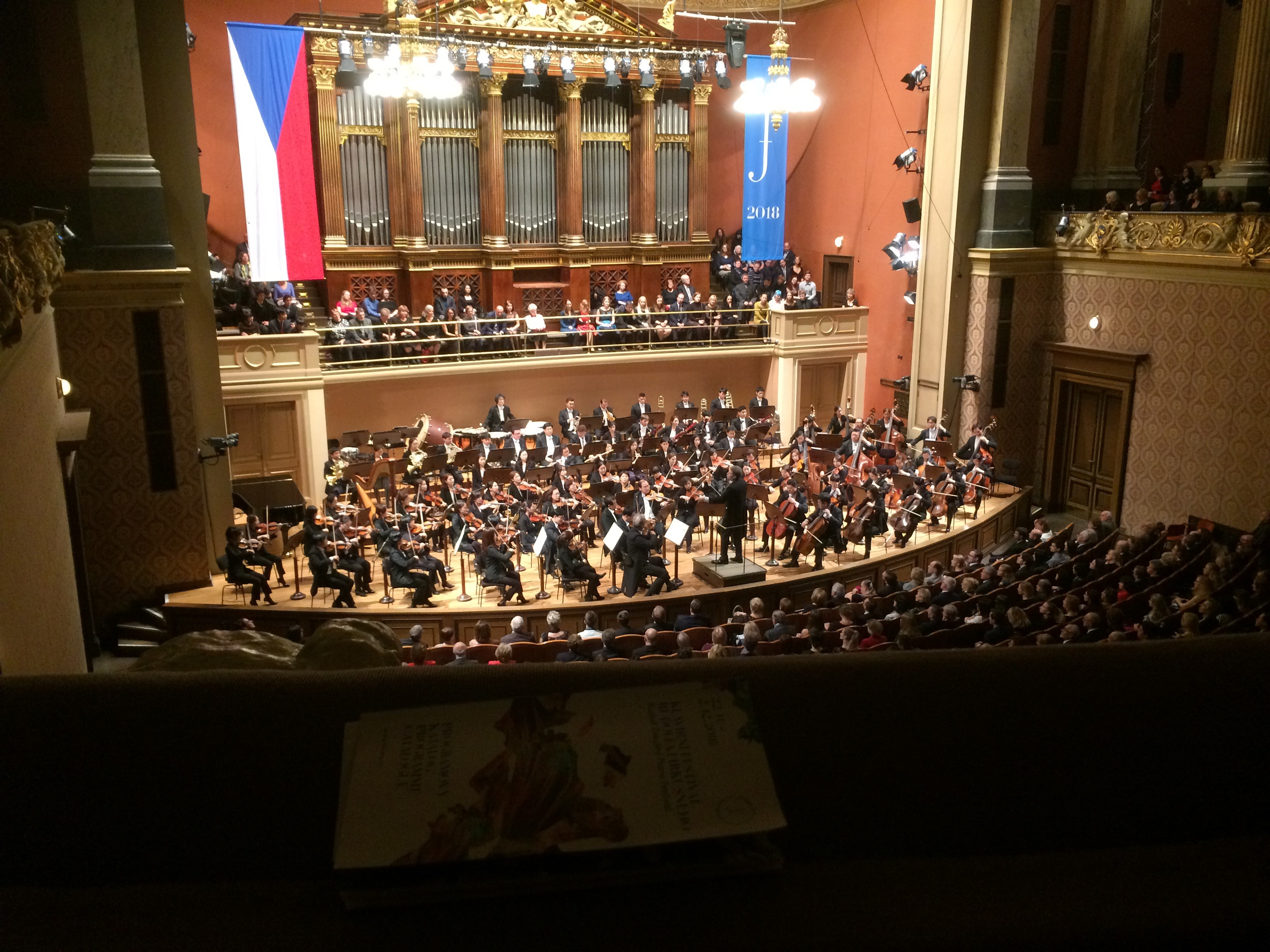
KBS Symphony Orchestra with chief conductor Yoel Levi performing in the Dvořák's Hall of Rudolfinum, Prague during the Rudolf Firkušný's International Piano Festival

The orchestra was founded in 1956 as the radio orchestra of the Korean Broadcasting System (KBS). Between 1969 and 1981, it became a state-run organization, changing its name to the National Symphony Orchestra of Korea. In this period, they performed chiefly in the National Theater of Korea. In 1979, they made their first tour overseas, in the USA.

From 1981, the orchestra's designation was restored to its former name, and new positions, such as general manager, principal guest conductor and full-time conductor, were established in the organization. Their subsequent overseas tours were in Southeast Asia (1984) and Japan (1985 and 1991). In October 1995, they performed in the UN General Assembly in New York City.

In 2000 and 2002, the orchestra performed with the State Symphony Orchestra of the Democratic People's Republic of Korea in Seoul and Pyongyang. The orchestra also held "goodwill exchange concerts" with the NHK Symphony Orchestra and the China National Symphony Orchestra in 2002.

Yoel Levi was music director of the orchestra from 2014 to 2019. In May 2021, the orchestra announced the appointment of Pietari Inkinen as its next chief conductor and music director, effective January 2022, with a contract through the end of 2024. Inkinen concluded his tenure with the orchestra in December 2024. In December 2025, the orchestra announced the re-appointment of Chung as its music director, effective in January 2026, with an initial contract through December 2028.

== Chief conductors ==
- Im Won-sik (1956–1971)
- Yeon-Taek Hong (1971–1981)
- Gyeong-Su Won (1986–1988)
- Othmar Mága (1992–1996)
- Myung-whun Chung (1998)
- Dmitri Kitayenko (1999–2004)
- Shinik Hahm (2010–2012)
- Yoel Levi (2014–2019)
- Pietari Inkinen (2022–2024)
- Myung-whun Chung (2026–present)

== Recordings ==
In 1995, the KBS Symphony Orchestra recorded Alan Hovhaness' Symphonies Nos. 39 and 46 with guitarist Michael Long and conductor Vakhtang Jordania with KOCH International Classics. The orchestra has also made recordings for labels such as Seoul Records and KBS.
