= Saburō Moroi =

Japanese composer

- 諸井 三郎
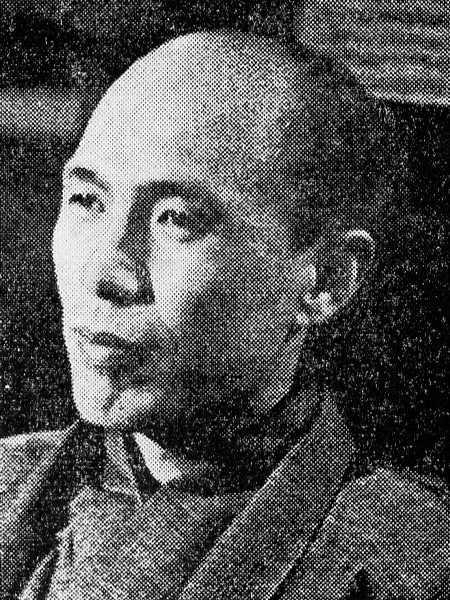
- Born: 7 August 1903; Tokyo, Japan
- Died: 24 March 1977 (aged 73)
- Education: Tokyo Imperial University
- Occupation: Composer
- Children: Makoto Moroi

Saburō Moroi (諸井三郎, Moroi Saburō; 7 August 1903 – 24 March 1977) was a Japanese composer.

== Life ==
Moroi was self-taught in composition while studying at the Tokyo Imperial University before moving in 1932 to Germany to study in the Berlin Musikhochschule under Leo Schrattenholz and Walter Gmeindl. While Moroi had been active in the Tokyo musical scene, forming with other colleagues a society named Surya, he claimed that his creative life truly started from his Berlin days. Returning to Japan in 1934, he built a successful career in subsequent years. His work was part of the music event in the art competition at the 1936 Summer Olympics.

Soon after completing his Symphony No. 3 in 1944 he was called up by the Japanese Army to serve in the Second World War. Following the country's surrender he focused on teaching and writing books on music theory, composing just eight works in the following three decades, including two more symphonies. In his last works he turned to the twelve-tone system.

Pupils of Moroi include Ikuma Dan, Toriro Miki, Toshiharu Ichikawa (市川都志春), Yoshirō Irino, Kunio Toda (戸田邦雄), Minao Shibata, Sōkichi Ozaki (尾崎宗吉), Akio Yashiro, Chūji Kinoshita (木下忠司), and Im Won-sik. His son Makoto Moroi was also a composer.

== List of works ==
=== Orchestral ===
- Symphonic Fragments (交響的断章 Kōkyōteki danshō) (1928); formerly Op. 19
- Symphony No. 1 in C minor, Op. 8 (1933)
- Symphony No. 2, Op. 16 (1937–1938)
- Imperial Army Ode (皇軍頌歌 Kōgun shōka), Symphonic Poem (1942)

3. Banri no soto (萬里の外)

- Two Symphonic Movements (交響的二楽章 Kōkyōteki ni gakushō), Op. 22 (1942)
- The Admiral, Killed in Action (提督戦死 Teitoku senshi), Symphonic Poem (1943)
- Praise the Dawn (黎明を讃ふ Reimei wo tatau), Symphonic Fantasy in C major (1943)
- Sinfonietta for Children (こどものための小交響曲 Kodomo no tame no shō-kōkyōkyoku) in B♭, Op. 24 (1943)
- Symphony No. 3, Op. 25 (1943–1944)
- Ovation on Toward Victory (勝利への歓呼 Shōri e no kanko), Overture (1944)
- Symphony No. 4, Op. 27 (1951)
- Symphony No. 5 "Academic Festival Symphony" (大学祝典交響曲 Daigaku shukuten kōkyōkyoku), Op. 29 (1970)

=== Concertante ===
- Concerto in F♯ minor for piano and orchestra (1927); formerly Op. 6
- Concerto No. 1 in C major for piano and orchestra, Op. 7 (1933)
- Concerto for cello and orchestra, Op. 12 (1936)
- Concerto for bassoon and orchestra, Op. 14 (1937); lost
- Concerto for violin and orchestra, Op. 18 (1939)
- Allegro (アレグロ) for piano and orchestra, Op. 26 (1947)
- Concerto No. 2 for piano and orchestra, Op. 31 (1977)

=== Chamber ===
- Sonata No. 1 for cello and piano (1927)
- Piano Trio in B minor (1927)
- Sonata No. 1 for violin and piano (1927)
- Sonata No. 2 for cello and piano (1928)
- Sonata No. 3 for cello and piano (1929)
- Sonata No. 2 for violin and piano (1929)
- Piano Quintet (1930)
- String Quartet, Op. 6 (1933)
- Piano Quartet, Op. 9 (1934)
- Sonata for viola and piano, Op. 11 (1935)
- Trio for cello, viola da gamba and harpsichord, Op. 13 (1936)
- Sonata for flute and piano, Op. 15 (1937)
- String Sextet, Op. 17 (1939)
- String Trio, Op. 19 (1939)
- Sonata for horn and piano, Op. 32 (1977)

=== Piano ===
Moroi composed a total of ten sonatas for piano: three early sonatas, five numbered sonatas written between 1927 and 1931, and a second set of two numbered sonatas with opus numbers written in 1933 and 1939.

- Sonata (1920)
- Sonata (1922)
- Sonata in D minor (1923)
- Sonata No. 1 in D major (1927)
- Sonata No. 2 in A♭ minor (1927)
- Sonata No. 3 (1928)
- Sonata No. 4 (1929)
- Prelude (前奏曲 Zensōkyoku) (1930)
- Sonata No. 5 (1931)
- Sonata No. 1, Op. 5 (1933)
- Sonata No. 2, Op. 20 (1939)
- Suite for Piano (ピアノのための組曲 Piano no tame no kumikyoku) (1942)
- Preludio and Allegro giocoso (前奏曲とアレグロ・ジョコーソ) (1971)

=== Choral ===
- Prayer for Peace (平和の祈り Heiwa no inori), Cantata (1950)
- A Visit of the Sun (太陽のおとずれ Taiyō no otozure), Fantasy-Oratorio for baritone, female chorus and orchestra, Op. 28 (1968)

=== Vocal ===
- Kokyoku (小曲) for voice and piano (1926); words by Atsuo Ōki (大木惇夫)
- The Boy (少年 Shōnen) for voice and piano (1926); words by Tatsuji Miyoshi
- Wind, Light, Leaves (風、光、木の葉 Kaze, hikari, konoha) for voice and piano (1926); words by Atsuo Ōki (大木惇夫)
- Ginkgo Tree (公孫樹 Ichō) for voice and piano (1927); words by Shigeo Inoue (井上思外雄)
- The Deathbed (臨終 Rinjū) for voice and cello (1928); words by Chūya Nakahara
- Morning Song (朝の歌 Asa no uta) for voice and cello (1928); words by Chūya Nakahara
- Munashiki aki (空しき秋) for voice and piano (1929); words by Chūya Nakahara
- The Pram (乳母車 Ubaguruma) for voice and piano (1931); words by Tatsuji Miyoshi
- Two Songs (2つの歌曲 Futatsu no kakyoku) for soprano and orchestra, Op. 10 (1935); words by Chūya Nakahara

1. Spring and Baby (春と赤ん坊 Haru to akanbō)
2. My Sister (妹よ Imo yo)

- Tōki yama miyu (遠き山見ゆ) for voice and piano, Op. 33 (1977); words by Tatsuji Miyoshi
