= East Berlin Affair =

Global political scandal

The East Berlin Affair, also known as the Dongbaekrim Incident (Korean: 동백림 사건), was a Cold War-era political scandal centered on South Korea's crackdown on individuals accused of spying for North Korea. The incident began in mid 1967 under the authoritarian regime of President Park Chung Hee and involved the South Korean Central Intelligence Agency (KCIA) targeting Korean expatriates, including students, intellectuals, and artists, primarily in Europe. Many victims were deceived or lured into arrest while others were physically coerced by officials trained in Taekwondo. Media coverage and pressure from escapees and other Koreans living in Germany forced German police to protect the remaining 4000 or so South Korean nationals in the country.

Most of those caught up in the affair were either outspoken critics of the Park Chung-hee regime or actively advocated for democracy or unification.

== Background ==
Both Koreans and Germans experienced the breakup of their nations less than 10 years apart. However, while Germany's separation was due to the redrawing of borders as a compromise after the fall of Nazi Germany, Korea's split was due to an intense civil war. These reasons for the placement of borders allowed for differing accessibility to the other side. The borders in Germany, even after the construction of the Berlin Wall, were far more porous for the movement of people and ideas than the border separating the two Koreas.

The presence of Koreans in East Berlin during the mid-20th century was shaped by a combination of geopolitical and socio-economic factors. After the Korean War (1950–1953), East Germany, aligned with the Soviet Union and much of the Eastern Bloc, sought to establish stronger ties with North Korea. As part of this effort, East Germany offered scholarships and educational opportunities to students, particularly in fields like medicine, engineering, and the arts. This initiative aimed to promote socialist ideals and foster solidarity between the two nations. Some South Koreans, studying abroad primarily in West Germany, also migrated to East Berlin for its academic opportunities and its position as a gateway between the two ideological blocs of the Cold War.

East Berlin's significance was further heightened by Cold War political alliances. For North Korea, the city served as a strategic hub to promote its ideological and diplomatic interests. Korean intellectuals and students aligned with socialist ideals were encouraged to move to East Berlin, where they could engage in discussions about Korean reunification and participate in global leftist networks. This environment offered an alternative to the staunch anti-communist regimes in South Korea, attracting those critical of authoritarian governance.

== Accusations ==
The KCIA accused hundred of South Korean nationals of participating in espionage activities and allegedly meeting North Korean agents in East Berlin. Some were accused of traveling to North Korea. The operation, carried out in multiple European countries such as West Germany and France, led to the abduction and forced extradition of more than 200 individuals to South Korea. Among those targeted was renowned composer Isang Yun, who was detained in Germany and secretly transported to South Korea without proper legal procedures. Once in South Korea, Yun and others faced imprisonment and harsh interrogations, often under torture, as part of the regime's anti-communist campaign. At least two were sentenced to death.

== Notable victims ==
- Isang Yun - Korean-born German composer (1917–1995)
- Yi Eungro - Korean painter (1904–1989), then living in France
- Cheon Sang-byeong - South Korean writer (1930–1993)

== International response ==
The affair had significant international repercussions. The operation was widely condemned as a violation of international law, leading Germany to protest by expelling South Korean diplomats and halting financial aid to South Korea. The scandal exposed the authoritarian nature of the South Korean regime, further straining its international relations and domestic credibility.

The French government conducted an investigation into the matter, though was far more passive in its attempt to secure Koreans abducted on their soil than West Germany. Unlike West Germany, France seemed to not show concern for French-Koreans who were arrested or abducted within South Korea. The French people and media, however, were outspoken in petitioning both the French and South Korean governments for the release of those involved.
