= Sinfonietta (Moroi) =

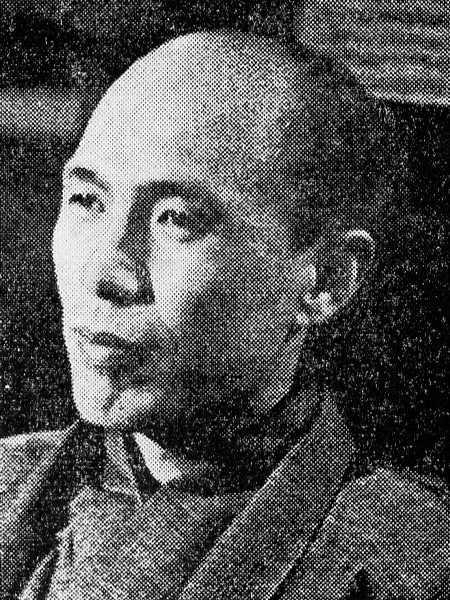
Saburō Moroi

Sinfonietta for Children (Japanese: こどものための小交響曲 Kodomo no tame no shō-kōkyōkyoku) in B♭, Op. 24 (1943) is an orchestral composition by Japanese composer Saburō Moroi.

Written throughout October 1943 in the midst of the Second World War, the work was premiered by the Tokyo Broadcast Orchestra with Moroi conducting on 5 November 1943, just five days after the completion.

== Music ==
Scored for double winds, brass, timpani and strings, the Sinfonietta is a neoclassical triptych consisting of a sonata form opening, a minuet and a mournful finale, marked:

1. Allegro grazioso
2. Andantino quasi allegretto
3. Lento affabile

== Recordings ==
- RTÉ National Symphony Orchestra — Takuo Yuasa, 2002. Naxos Records.

== Reception ==
Gwin Parry-Jones from Musicweb International gave a positive review of the work following Naxos' release, highlighting the elegiac finale (haunting, moving music) as its most appealing movement while praising the charm, inventiveness and orchestration of the Allegro grazioso. Hubert Culot from the same website wrote a mediocre review while highlighting the work's melodic charm.

Victor Carr Jr. from Classics Today, praising Moroi's music as stimulating and often very beautiful, relates the composition to 19th-century French music with its tuneful melodies, light textures, breezy flow, and lush orchestral palette.
