= Motojirō Kajii =

Japanese writer (1901–1932)

Motojirō Kajii 梶井 基次郎
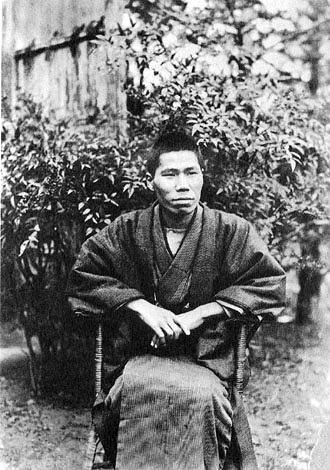
- Motojirō at garden of his brother's house in Kawabe District, Hyōgo (January 1931)
- Born: February 17, 1901; Nishi-ku, Osaka, Japan
- Died: March 24, 1932 (aged 31); Oji-cho, Sumiyoshi-ku (now:Abeno-ku), Osaka
- Resting place: Minami-ku (now:Chūō-ku), Osaka
- Education: University of Tokyo (withdrew)
- Occupation: Writer
- Writing career
- Language: Japanese
- Period: 1925 – 1932
- Genres: Short story, Prose poetry
- Notable works: Lemon (1925); In a Castle Town (1925); Winter Days (1927); Flies of Winter (1928); Beneath the Cherry Trees (1928); The Scroll of Darkness (1930); The Easygoing Patient (1932)
- Literary movement: (I-Novel)

Motojirō Kajii (梶井 基次郎, Kajii Motojirō; also Motojirou Kajii, February 17, 1901 – March 24, 1932) was a Japanese writer in the early Shōwa period known for his poetic short stories. Kajii's works included Remon (檸檬; "Lemon"), "Shiro no aru machi nite" (城のある町にて; "In a Castle Town"). Fuyu no hi (冬の日; "Winter Days") and Sakura no ki no shita ni wa (櫻の樹の下には; "Beneath the Cherry Trees"). His poetic works were praised by fellow writers including Yasunari Kawabata and Yukio Mishima. Today his works are admired for their finely tuned self-observation and descriptive power.

Despite the limited body of work he created during his short lifetime, Kajii has managed to leave a lasting footprint on Japanese culture. "Lemon" is a staple of literature textbooks. According to a report in major daily newspaper Asahi Shimbun, many high school students have emulated the protagonist's defiant act of leaving a lemon in the book section of Maruzen, a department store chain. The opening line of "Under the Cherry Trees" (Dead bodies are buried under the cherry trees!) is popularly quoted in reference to hanami, the Japanese custom of cherry blossom viewing.

== Biography ==
=== Childhood and education (1901–1924) ===
Kajii was born in Osaka in 1901. He attended primary school in Tokyo from 1910 to 1911, middle school in Toba from 1911 to 1913, and Osaka Prefectural Kitano High School from 1914 to 1919. In September 1919, Kajii entered Kyoto's Third Higher School (Kyoto-Sanko, a junior college), where his roommate was Tadashi Iijima. While a student there in 1920, he was diagnosed with pulmonary tuberculosis.

=== Early literary career (1924–1928) ===
In 1924, Kajii entered Tokyo Imperial University, where he studied English literature. Shortly, he planned for publish a literary coterie magazine Aozora (青空; "Blue Sky"), with his friends from high school.

In 1925, Remon (檸檬; "Lemon") was published in Aozora first issue.

After relinquished a graduation, Kajii had been stayed in Yugasima (湯ヶ島; "Yugasima Onsen") on the Izu Peninsula between 1927 and 1928, hoping to recuperate. During that time, he visited the writer Yasunari Kawabata, whom he befriended. The two writers would play go together several times a week.

After Aozora ceased publication in 1927, Kajii's works appeared in Bungei Toshi (文藝都市; "The Literary City"), another literary coterie magazine.

=== Late career and death (1928–1932) ===
In September 1928, Kajii returned to Osaka, where he spent a period of convalescence at home.

Sensing his impending death, friends including the poet Tatsuji Miyoshi and Ryūzō Yodono decided to publish his first book, a collection of his short stories titled Lemon in 1931.

In 1932, he wrote his first novella, titled Nonki na kanja (のんきな患者; "The Easygoing Patient"). Its publication in Chūōkōron, which had commissioned the work, was Kajii's first in the commercial magazine.

On March 24, 1932, Kajii died of tuberculosis at age 31.

== Bibliography ==
=== Works available in English translation ===
Monographs

- The Youth of Things: Life and Death in the Age of Kajii Motojiro (2014) - ed. Stephen Dodd (ISBN 978-0824838409)
- Lemon (2009) - trans. Chinatsu Komori and Kenneth Traynor (ISBN 978-0982438411)

Anthologies

- "Mating" in The Shōwa Anthology (1984) - eds. Van C. Gessel and Tomone Matsumoto (ISBN 978-4770017086)
- "Lemon" in The Oxford Book of Japanese Short Stories (1997) - ed. Theodore W. Goossen (ISBN 978-0199583195)
- "Mire" in Tokyo Stories: A Literary Stroll (2002) - ed. Lawrence Rogers (ISBN 978-0520217881)
- "Lemon" in The Columbia Anthology of Modern Japanese Literature, Vol. 1 (2005) - eds. J. Thomas Rimer and Van C. Gessel (ISBN 978-0231118613)
- "The Lemon," "The Ascension of K, or His Death by Drowning," and "Feelings Atop a Cliff" in Modanizumu; Modernist Fiction from Japan, 1913-1938 - ed. William Jefferson Tyler (ISBN 978-0824832421)
- "Scenes of the Mind" in Three-Dimensional Reading: Stories of Time and Space in Japanese Modernist Fiction, 1911-1932 - ed. Angela Yiu (ISBN 978-0824838010)

Literary magazines

- "Beneath the Cherry Trees" tr. John Bester in The Japan P.E.N. News (1964)
- "A Musical Derangement" tr. Stephen Wechselblatt in New Orleans Review (1983)
- "The Ascension/Drowning of K" and "Lemon" with introduction "Translating Kajii Motojiro" tr. Alfred Birnbaum in The Literary Review (1996)
- "Under the Cherry Blossoms" tr. Bonnie Huie in The Brooklyn Rail (2014)

Scholarly works

- Kajii Motojiro: An Anthology of Short Stories Translated into English (1977)
- Three Stories of Kajii Motojiro: A Study and Translation (1978)
- The Private World of Kajii Motojiro (1982)
- The Translator as Reader and Writer: English Versions of Japanese Short Fiction by Kajii Motojiro (1982)

Miscellaneous amateur translations on Internet (see external links below).

Translations into other languages as of 2007

- French: Le citron (1987, 1996) – partial translation of Remon (stories #1,8,9,10,11,13,16,18)
- Russian: Limon (2004) – full translation of Remon (stories #1–18)
- German: Bildrolle der Finsternis (2023) – partial translation of Remon (stories #1,2,10,11,15,18,20)

=== List of works in original Japanese ===
Stories in magazines

1. "Keikichi" (奎吉; "Keikichi") - May 1923
2. "Mujun no yōna shinjitsu" (矛盾の様な真実; "The Truth like a Contradiction") - July 1923
3. Remon (檸檬; "Lemon") – January 1925
4. "Shiro no aru machi nite" (城のある町にて; "In a Castle Town") - February 1925
5. "Deinei" (泥濘; "Mire") - July 1925
6. "Rojō" (路上; "On the Road") - October 1925
7. "Tochi no hana" (橡の花; "Aesculus") - November 1925
8. "Kako" (過古; "In the Past", "The Past") - January 1926
9. "Setsugo" (雪後; "After the Snow") - June 1926
10. "Kawabata Yasunari Dai-yon tanpen-shū Shinjū wo shudai to seru variation" (川端康成第四短篇集「心中」を主題とせるヴァリエイシヨン; "a Variation of Motif to "Shinjū" (心中; "Love Suicides"), 4th Collection of Yasunari Kawabata's Short stories") - July 1926
11. "Aru kokoro no fūkei" (ある心の風景; "A Landscape of the Soul", "Landscapes of the Heart") - August 1926
12. "K no shōten – aruiwa K no dekishi" (Kの昇天 – 或はKの溺死; "The Ascension of K, or K's Drowning", "The Ascension/Drowning of K") - October 1926
13. Fuyu no hi (冬の日; "Winter Days") - February, April 1927
14. "Sōkyū" (蒼穹, "Blue Sky") - March 1928
15. "Kakei no hanashi" (筧の話; "The Bamboo Pipe", "The Story of the Bamboo Pipe") – April 1928
16. "Kigakuteki-genkaku" (器樂的幻覺; "Instrumental Hallucinations", "A Musical Derangement", "Instrumental Illusions") – May 1928
17. "Fuyu no hae" (冬の蠅; "Flies of Winter", "Winter Flies") – May 1928
18. "Aru gake-ue no kanjō" (ある崖上の感情; "Feelings Atop a Cliff", "Certain Feelings on a Cliff Top") – July 1928
19. Sakura no ki no shita ni wa (櫻の樹の下には; "Beneath the Cherry Trees", "Under the Cherry Trees") – December 1928
20. "Aibu" (愛撫; "Caress") – June 1930
21. "Yami no emaki" (闇の繪巻; "The Scroll of Darkness", "Scroll of Darkness") – September 1930
22. "Kōbi" (交尾; "Mating") – January 1931
23. Nonnki na kanja (のんきな患者; "The Easygoing Patient", "The Carefree Patient") – January 1932, novella

(Unpublished or unfinished works included in Complete Works are not listed above.)

Books

- Remon (檸檬; "Lemon") – May 1931, collection (stories #1–18)
  -- posthumously --
- Kajii Motojirō zenshū (Jōge-kan) (梶井基次郎全集 (上・下巻); Kajii Motojirō Complete Works, Vol.1 and 2) – 1934 (ed. Takao Nakatani, Ryūzō Yodono) Rokuhō Shoin
- Kajii Motojirō zenshū (Dai 1-kan) (梶井基次郎全集 (第1卷); Kajii Motojirō Complete Works, Vol. 1) – 1947 (ed. Ryūzō Yodono) Kyoto: Kōtō Shoin
- Kajii Motojirō zenshū (Dai 2-kan) (梶井基次郎全集 (第2卷); Kajii Motojirō Complete Works, Vol. 2) – 1948 (ed. Ryūzō Yodono) Kyoto: Kōtō Shoin
- "Wakaki shijin no tegami" (若き詩人の手紙; "Letters of a Young Poet") – 1955, selected correspondence. 1955 (ed. Ryūzō Yodono) Kadokawa Shoten
- Kettei-ban Kajii Motojirō zenshū (Zen 3-kan) (決定版 梶井基次郎全集 (全3卷); Kajii Motojirō Complete Works Definitive edition, Vol. 1-3) – 1959 (ed. Ryūzō Yodono, Takao Nakatani) Tokyo: Chikuma Shobō. Reprinted in 1966.
- Kajii Motojirō zenshū (Zen 3-kan＋Bekkan) (梶井基次郎全集 (全3卷＋別巻); Kajii Motojirō Complete Works, Vol. 1-3 and supplementary) – 1999-2000 (ed. Sadami Suzuki) Tokyo: Chikuma Shobō

== See also ==
- Japanese literature
- List of Japanese authors
