= Tatsuji Miyoshi =

Japanese poet and literary critic

- 三好 達治
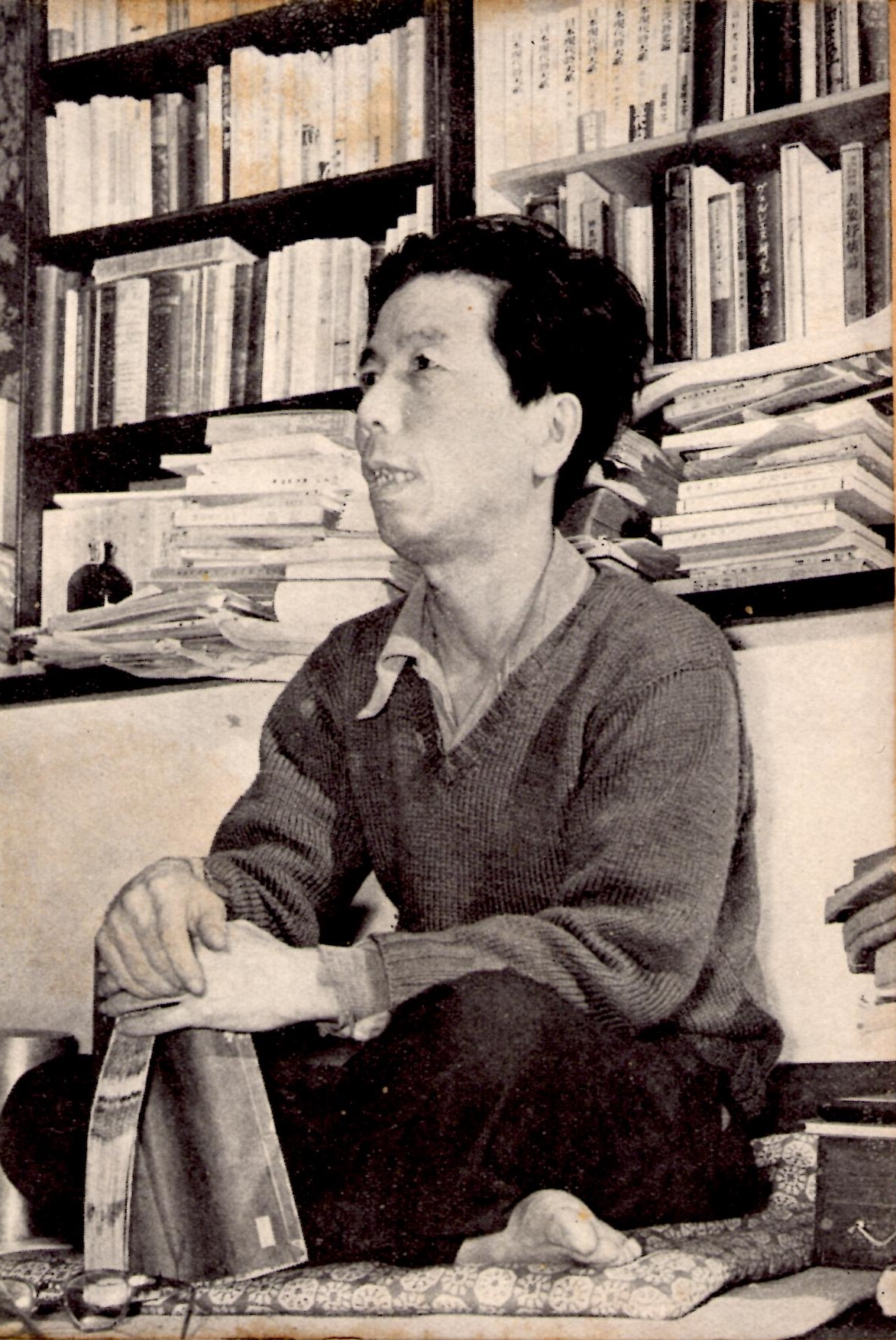
- Miyoshi in 1951
- Born: 23 August 1900; Nishi-ku, Osaka, Japan
- Died: 5 April 1964 (aged 63); Tokyo, Japan
- Occupations: Writer, critic, poet
- Writing career
- Genres: Haiku poetry, essays

Tatsuji Miyoshi (三好 達治, Miyoshi Tatsuji; 23 August 1900 – 5 April 1964) was a Japanese poet, literary critic, and literary editor active during the Shōwa period of Japan. He is known for his lengthy free verse poetry, which often portray loneliness and isolation as part of contemporary life, but which are written in a complex, highly literary style reminiscent of classical Japanese poetry.

== Early life ==
Miyoshi was born in Nishi-ku, Osaka as the eldest son in a large family of modest background running a printing business. He suffered from poor health as a child and was frequently absent from school due to nervous breakdowns. He was forced to drop out of junior high school due to inability to pay the tuition once the family business went bankrupt, and his father abandoned the family to escape from creditors. He was only able to complete his schooling by the charity of an aunt.

From 1915-1921 Miyoshi enlisted in the Imperial Japanese Army, first undergoing training at the Osaka Army Cadet School, followed by a tour of duty in Korea. He left the army in 1921 to enroll in the Third Higher School in Kyoto, where he majored in literature. Miyoshi had been interested in literature even while still at high school, especially in the works of Friedrich Nietzsche and Ivan Turgenev. In 1914, he began to compose his own haiku verse.

== Literary career ==
Miyoshi went to Tokyo to study French literature at Tokyo Imperial University from 1925-1928. While a student, he made a translation of the full works of the French poet Charles Baudelaire's collection Le Spleen de Paris into Japanese, as well as translations of several French prose writers, which were published in 1929. While in school, he became friends with short story writer Motojirō Kajii and Nakatani Takao, with whom he published the literary magazine, Aozora (“Blue Skies”), which gave him a venue to publish his poems such as Ubaguruma (“Pram”) and Ishi no ue (“On Stone”), which were favorably received by literary critics, including Hagiwara Sakutaro. Hagiwara joined him in founding the critical journal, Shi to Shiron (“Poetry and Poetic Theory”) in 1928.

In 1930, Miyoshi brought out his first major anthology of free verse, Sokuryo sen (“The Surveying Ship”). The expressions reminiscent of classical Japanese poetry combined with the intellectualism of his work established his reputation. In 1934 he brought out another anthology, serialized in the literary journal Shiki (“Four Seasons”), together with Hori Tatsuo and Maruyama Kaoru, and became a central figure in the running of the magazine.

Miyoshi courted the sister of Hagiwara Sakutaro, Hagiwara Ai, but they were unable to get married due to the opposition of her parents. From 1944-1949, Miyoshi relocated to Mikuni, Fukui.

In June 1946, he published in the magazine Shinchō the first part of an essay in which he called for Emperor Showa's abdication and, in very harsh terms, accused him of being not only "primary responsible for the defeat" but "bearing responsibility for having been extremely negligent in the performance of his duties".

Miyoshi’s output was steady and varied for the rest of his long career. Aside from free verse anthologies, such as Nansoshu (“From a Southern Window”) and Rakuda no kobu ni matagatte (“On a Camel's Hump”), which won the Yomiuri Literary Prize, he also wrote literary criticism of verse, Fuei junikagetsu and Takujo no hana (“Flowers on a Table”), a collection of essays, Yoru tantan, and a major critique of fellow poet, Hagiwara Sakutarō.

== Legacy ==
Miyoshi died in 1964 of a heart attack. His grave is at the temple of Honcho-ji in Takatsuki, Osaka, where his nephew was chief priest. In the year 2004, the city of Osaka established the Miyoshi Tatsuji Award, for the best outstanding anthology of poetry published nationwide. The prize money was set at 1 million yen.

Yōko Hagiwara wrote a book about Miyoshi's romance with Ai Hagiwara in 1966. It was titled Tenjō no Hana. It was adapted into a film in 2022.

== See also ==
- Japanese literature
- List of Japanese authors
