= List of magazines in Japan =

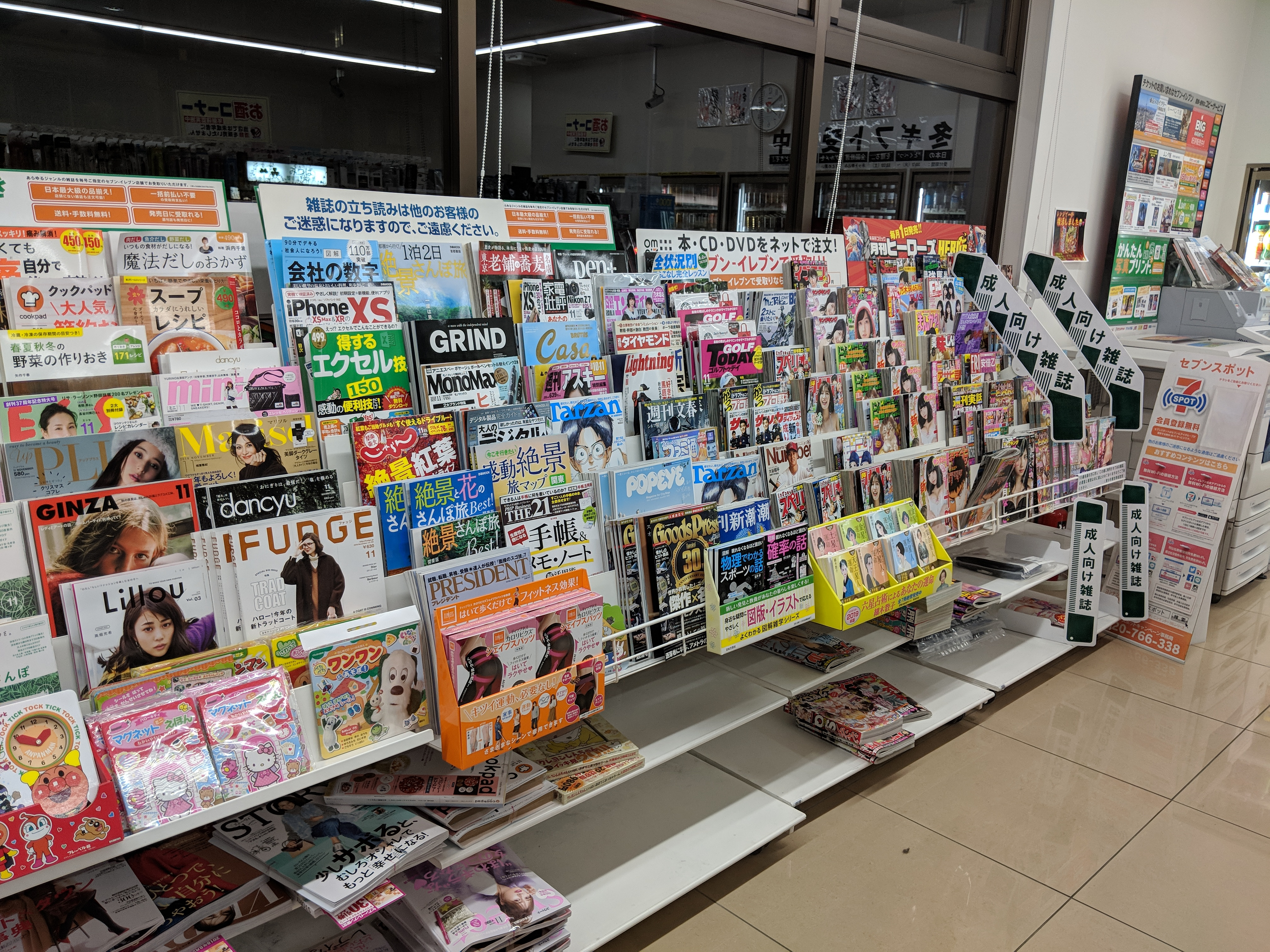
A selection of magazines for sale at a 7-Eleven in Sumida, Tokyo.

The first Japanese magazine was published in Japan in October 1867. The magazine named Seiyo-Zasshi (meaning Western Magazine in English) was established and published until September 1869 by Shunzo Yanagawa, a Japanese scholar. In 1940 there were nearly 3,000 magazines in the country. Following World War II the number of magazines significantly increased. At the end of 2011 there were 3,376 magazines in the country.

The following is a list of magazines published in Japan. These may or may not be published in Japanese.

== A ==
- Aera (1988–)
- Akai tori (1918–1936)
- An an (1970–)
- AneCan (2007–2016)
- Animage (1978–)
- Animedia (magazine)
- ASCII (1977-2010)

== B ==
- Bead Friend (2003–)
- Beautiful Lady & Television (1997–)
- Beep (1984-1989)
- Best Motoring (1987–2011)
- Big Comic (1968–)
- Big Comic Original (1972–)
- Bis (2001–)
- Bluestocking (1911–1916)
- Bōken sekai (1908–1920)
- Brutus (1980–)
- Bungeishunjū (1923–)
- Burrn! (1984–)

== C ==
- CanCam (1981–)
- CARTOP
- Cawaii! (1996–2009)
- Chagurin
- ChokiChoki
- Chūōkōron (1887–)
- Ciao (1977–)
- Classy (1984–)
- Comic Kairakuten
- Comptiq (1983–)
- CoroCoro Comic (1977–)
- Cosmode (2002–)
- Croissant
- CQ ham radio (1946–)
- Cure (2003–)

== D ==
- Daruma Magazine (1994–2011)
- Dengeki Hobby Magazine (1998–2015)
- Dengeki Maoh (2005–)
- Dengeki PlayStation (1994–2020)
- Drift Tengoku (1996–)

== E–G ==
- Egg (1995–2014)
- Facta (2005–)
- Famicom Best (1988-?)
- Famicom Champion (1986-?)
- Famicom Hisshoubon (1986-1990)
- Famicom Top (1986-?)
- Family Computer Magazine (1985-1998)
- Faust (2003–2011)
- Five Nine
- Front (1942–1945)
- Fruits (1997–2017)
- Fujin Gahō (1905–)
- Fujin no Tomo (1908–)
- Fujin Sekai (1906–1933)
- Fujin shinpo
- Fujin Seikatsu
- Game Boy (1985-?)
- Gamest
- Gekkan bunkazai (1963–)
- Gothic & Lolita Bible (2001–)

== H–I ==
- Hanako (1988–)
- Happie Nuts (2004–2016)
- Hi-Score (1986-?)
- Hiragana Times
- Hobby of Model Railroading (1947–)
- Hot-Dog Press (1979-2004)
- Huge
- I Love Mama (2008–)
- I/O (1976–)
- Ie no Hikari (1925–)

== J ==
- Japan Railfan Magazine (1961–)
- Japan Spotlight (1982–)
- Japanzine (1990–)
- Jiji shinpō
- JJ (1975–)
- Jogaku Sekai (1901–1925)
- Jogaku zasshi
- Josei (1922–1928)
- Josei Jishin (1958–)
- The Journal of Insectivorous Plant Society (1950–)
- Jump Square (2007–)
- Junon (1973–)

== K ==
- Kansai Time Out (1977–2009)
- Kabuki shinpō (1879–1897)
- Kingu (1924–1957)
- Koakuma Ageha (2005–)
- Kodomo no kuni (1922–1944)
- Kokoku Hihyo (1979–2009)
- Kokumin no Tomo (1887–1897)

== L–O ==
- Login (1982-2008)
- Love Berry (2001–2012)
- Marco Polo (1992–1995)
- Marukatsu Famicom (1986-1990)
- Marukatsu Mega Drive (1992-?)
- Marukatsu PC Engine (1988-?)
- Marukatsu Super Famicom (1990-1996)
- Meiroku zasshi (1884–1885)
- MensEGG (1999–2013)
- Men's Non-no
- MSX Fan (1987-1995)
- MSX Magazine (1983-1992)
- Mycom BASIC (1982-2003)
- Monthly Afternoon (1986–)
- Monthly Shōnen Magazine (1964–)
- Mu (1979–)
- Newtype (1985–)
- Nicola (1997–)
- Nippon Fujin (1942–1945)
- Non-no (1971–)
- Oh!FM (1982-1996)
- Oh!MZ (1982-1995)
- Oh!PC (1982-2000)
- Oily Boy
- Option (1981–)

== P ==
- Pichi Lemon (1986–2015)
- Pinky (2004–2010)
- Popeye (1976–)
- Popcom (1983-1994)
- PopSister (2010–2011)
- Popteen (1980–)

== R–S ==
- Ranzuki (2000–)
- Seventeen (1967–)
- Shashin Shūhō (1938–1945)
- Shin-Bijutsukai (1901–1906)
- Shirakaba (1910–1923)
- Shiso (1921–)
- Shojo no Tomo (1908–1955)
- Shufu no Tomo (1917–2008)
- Shūkan Bunshun
- Shūkan Famitsū (1985–)
- Shukan Shincho (1956–)
- Soen (1936–)
- Sweet (1999–)

== T–V ==
- Taiyō (1895–1928)
- Technopolis (1982-1994)
- Tianyi bao (1907–1908)
- Tōbaé (1887–1889)
- Tsubomi (2009–2012)
- Uchusen (1980–2005, 2008–)
- UniJapan Film Quarterly (1958–1979)
- V Jump (1993–)
- Vivi (1983–)

== W ==
- Weekly Manga Goraku (1968–)
- Weekly Manga Sunday (1959–2013)
- Weekly Morning (1982–)
- Weekly Shōnen Champion (1969–)
- Weekly Shōnen Jump (1968–)
- Weekly Shōnen Magazine (1959–)
- Weekly Shōnen Sunday (1959–)
- Weekly Toyo Keizai (1895–)
- Weekly Young Jump (1979–)
- Weekly Young Magazine (1980–)

== Y ==
- You
- Young Animal Arashi
- Young Magazine Uppers
- Young You
- Yūben (1910–1941)
- Yuraku
- Yuri Shimai

== See also ==
- List of Japanese manga magazines by circulation
- List of manga magazines § Published in Japan
- List of magazines by circulation § Japan
