= Marukatsu Famicom =

Japanese video game magazine

- Cover of the first issue of Marukatsu Famicom
- Categories: Video game
- First issue: April 1986; 40 years ago
- Final issue: 1997; 29 years ago
- Company: Kadokawa Shoten
- Based in: Japan
- Language: Japanese

Marukatsu Famicom (Japanese: マル勝ファミコン; lit. 'Total Victory Family Computer') was a Japanese video game magazine that was published by Kadokawa Shoten. It was one of the early magazines from the publisher, followed by The Television and their computer magazine Comptiq. Following the boom in popularity of Nintendo's Family Computer video game console, Kadokawa's Marukatsu Famicom became one of the four major Famicom-related magazines of the era alongside Tokuma Shoten's Family Computer Magazine, JICC Publishing Bureau's Famicom Hisshoubon and ASCII Corporation's Famicom Tsūshin.

Feeling they could not compete with other video game magazines, Marukatsu Famicom began publishing material beyond video game articles, including the manga Mouryou Senki Madara. It became the first manga published in a video game magazine that was not a promotion for a current or upcoming video game, but an original work.

Marukatsu Famicom later changed its title to Marukatsu Super Famicom while Kadokawa would also publish similar publications for other consoles, such as Marukatsu PC Engine which covered the PC Engine. Due to arguments between two brothers who were the president and vice president of Kadokawa Shoten in the early 1990s, several of the staff left Marukatsu Super Famicom to begin working with MediaWorks to publish magazines such as Dengeki PlayStation. Marukatsu Super Famicom continued until 1996 it changed its name to Marukatsu Game Shounen which ceased publication in 1997.

== Publication history ==
Kadokawa Shoten was established as a publishing house in 1945 by Genyoshi Kadokawa. Following Genyoshi's death in 1975, the company was led by Haruki Kadokawa. Haruki focused Kadokawa's production on large-scale media characterized by film productions made for mass audiences that would also feature novel adaptations and soundtracks as part of their media mix. Tsuguhiko Kadokawa, in contrast, developed smaller-scale media, such as drawing from the popularity of VCRs, which led to the publication of their first magazine, The Television magazine in September 1982. Tatsuo Satō, a freelance editor, suggested that Kadokawa develop a game magazine for the growing personal computer (PC) video game market at the time. This led to Comptiq being an extra edition of The Television before having its first issue in November 1983.

Between 1985 and 1987, the Family Computer boomed in popularity in Japan. This was due to the release of the high-selling game Super Mario Bros. (1985) as well as a large number of companies that got involved in developing games to sell for the Family Computer. In 1985, Comptiq dedicated an issue to the Family Computer. That same year, Tokuma Shoten released the first magazine dedicated to a Nintendo console, Family Computer Magazine. Tokuma Shoten's magazine became the first magazine dedicated to the Family Computer.

The next year, three new Nintendo magazines were published in Japan: ASCII Corporation's Famicom Tsushin (now known as Famitsu), JICC Publishing Bureau's Famicom Hisshoubon, and Kadokawa Shoten's Marukatsu Famicom which had its first issue in April 1986. These were the four major magazines covering the Famicom at its boom period. The magazine was initially published twice a month.

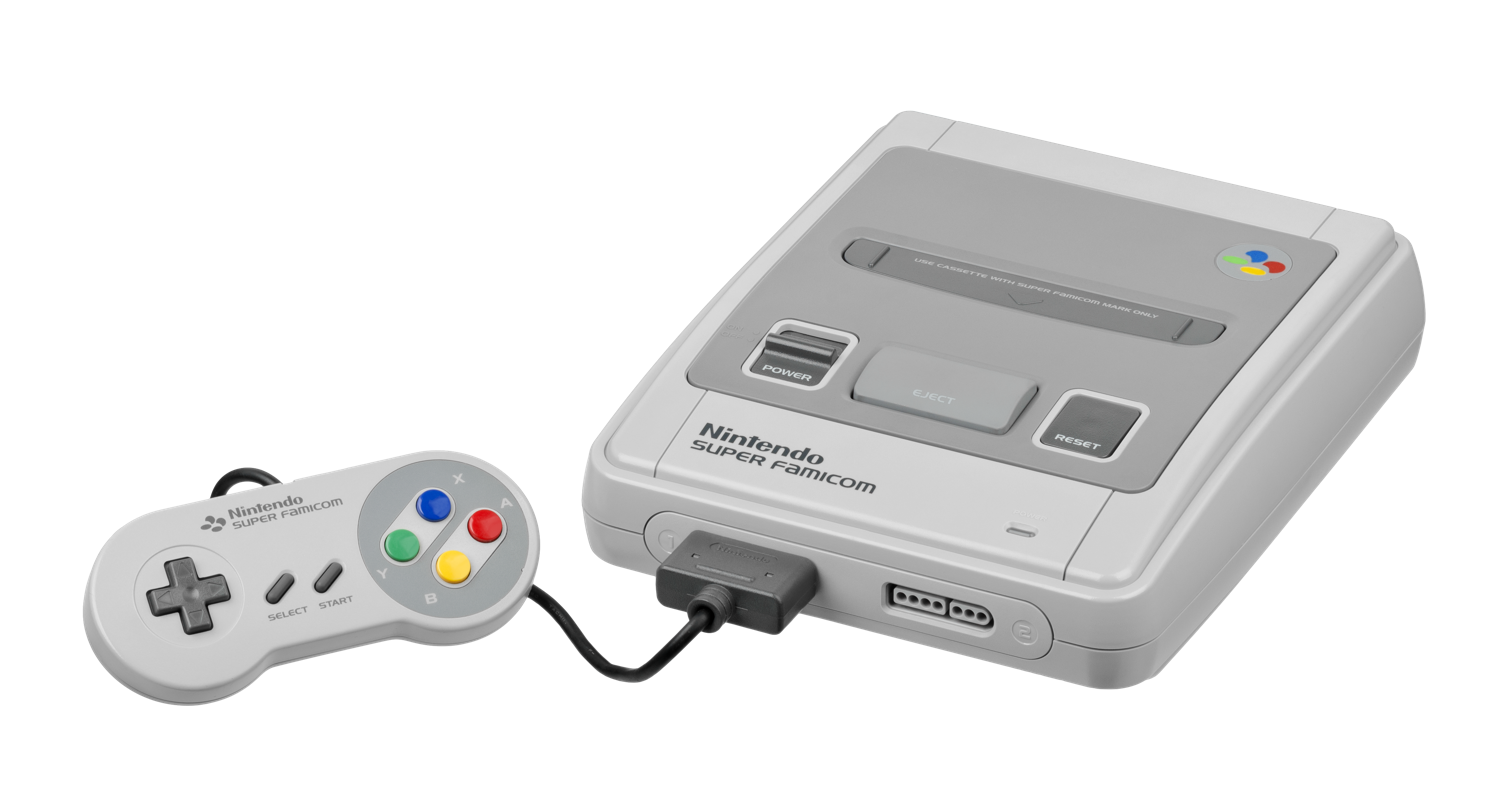
The release of the Super Famicom led to Marukatsu Famicom be re-named Marukatsu Super Famicom in 1991.

When Hudson Soft partnered with NEC to release the PC Engine video game console in 1987, Kadokawa launched Marukatsu PC Engine magazine in 1988 to cover the system. With the release of the Super Famicom in November 1990, Marukatsu Famicom changed its title to Marukatsu Super Famicom in April 1991. Marukatsu Mega Drive launched in 1992.

A major argument between the president of Kadokawa (Haruki) and its vice-president (Tsuguhiko) would develop around 1992 and 1993, which led Tsuguhiko to quit Kadokawa and start his own company MediaWorks. Months later, after Haruki was arrested on drug-trafficking charges in 1993, Tsuguhiko returned to control the company. This led to nearly all of its regular columns and ongoing manga in the magazine being suddenly cancelled. Marukatsu Super Famicom continued until 1996, when it changed its name to Marukatsu Game Shounen which ceased publication in 1997.

== Content ==
Like other Kadokawa magazines of the era such as Newtype and The Television, Marukatsu Famicom was promoted as an "information magazine", which allowed it to promote its own and other companies' content through advertising and articles.

These magazines quickly became the launching ground for new forms of media franchises. Marukatsu Famicom became known for serializing the manga Mouryou Senki Madara. Sato said that at the time, there was opposition in the editorial department to including manga in the Marukatsu Famicom and Comptiq, but they felt they could not compete with magazines like Login with just game reviews and analysis and had to provide something different. Mouryou Senki Madara, commonly abbreviated to Madara, was first published in the November 27, 1987 issue.

It was inspired by the Record of Lodoss War franchise, which began as a play session of the Dungeons and Dragons tabletop role-playing game which was first published in Kadokawa Shoten's Comptiq. Unlike the Lodoss War work, Madara was conceived and written by Eiji Ōtsuka under the pen name "Candy House". Otsuka worked with Kadokawa-affiliated companies as a freelance manga scriptwriter, novelist, and critic since around 1986. Madara had stories that mimicked the rules and role-playing video games (RPGs) of the era such as Dragon Quest and Final Fantasy. Ōtsuka deliberately left some parts untold in the official manga of Madara so that fans could actively participate in doujin activities. Other elements removed from later manga publications included pop-up menus that emulated RPG video games that gave characters RPG-like status screens.

== Legacy ==
Marukatsu Famicom had a circulation in the tens of thousands, whose audience was what academic Marc Steinberg referred to as a "a small, but dedicated fan base". Following the family debates between Tsuguhiko and Haruki, Tatsuo Satō and other writers left to develop magazines with MediaWorks.

The staff of the editorial department of Comptiq finished editing their final issue, New Year's 1993 issue which was released on December 8, 1992 at the Kadokawa Media office at the end of November 1992. They then gathered became employees of MediaWorks for the February issue of the newly launched magazine, Dengeki-Oh which released January 8, 1993. Many of the magazines developed at Kadokawa had similar magazines at MediaWorks such as Marukatsu Super Famicom with Dengeki Super Famicom.

Mouryou Senki Madara led to original video animation (OVA) and video game adaptations. Madara became the first original manga published in a game magazine, rather than one based on an existing or forthcoming game which was the standard practise at the time.

To coincide with the release of the Nintendo 3DS game Etrian Mystery Dungeon (2015), early copies of the game came with booklet titled Marukatsu Super Famicom 2015 Revival Edition, which were also later included in the February 26, 2015 issue of Famitsu.

== See also ==
- List of magazines in Japan
