= Comptiq =

Japanese video game magazine

- Cover of October 2024 issue
- Categories: Manga, bishōjo games, video games
- Frequency: Monthly
- Circulation: 74,417 (2009)
- Publisher: Kadokawa Shoten
- First issue: November 1983
- Country: Japan
- Based in: Tokyo
- Language: Japanese
- Website: web-ace.jp/comptiq/

Comptiq (コンプティーク, Konputīku) is a Japanese magazine. It began first as a section of Kadokawa Shoten's The Television magazine before becoming its own magazine in 1983. It initially was set-up to focus on video games for personal computers (PC) with Kadokawa working with a company called Comptiq to introduce Apple II software to Japan. Initially selling poorly, sales picked up by 1989.

While being focused on computer games from its initial 20th century run, the magazine also featured sections dedicated to Japanese idols, film and Family Computer game reviews, and tabletop role-playing games. It also began publishing Record of the Lodoss War in the 1980s which features write-ups of Dungeons & Dragons replays. The magazine also began publishing manga during this period. In the mid-1990s, the magazine began having interviews with voice actors which signaled the magazines shift to more content about bishōjo games and anime alongside computer games which began to take up one-third of its content.

Content like Record of the Lodoss War was an early precursor to what later became known as light novel.

== Publication history ==
Kadokawa Shoten was established as a publishing house in 1945 by Genyoshi Kadokawa. Following Genyoshi's death in 1975, the company was led by Haruki Kadokawa. Haruki focused Kadokawa's production on large-scale media characterized by film productions made for mass audiences that would also feature novel adaptations and soundtracks as part of their media mix. Tsuguhiko Kadokawa, in contrast, developed smaller-scale media, such as drawing from the popularity of VCRs, which led to the publication of their first magazine, The Television magazine in September 1982. Tatsuo Satō, a freelance editor, suggested that Kadokawa develop a game magazine for the growing personal computer (PC) video game market at the time. This led to Comptiq being an extra edition of The Television before having its first issue in November 1983.

Satō acted as the editor-in-chief of Comptiq. He had originally came from the toy industry ranging from children's toys to made by Takara and Bandai to toys for adults such as darts, card games, and backgammon. He predominantly saw video games from that perspective. In mid-1982 he went to the United States to study American home video game systems such as the Atari 2600 and ColecoVision. Initially, a game company named Comptiq was involved with the development of the magazine to focus on introducing Apple II software to Japan. As no one at the company had experience with editing a magazine, Sato joined them to work on it. This involved him bringing extra staff to work on the magazine which included Masaaki Tsukada and Hirokazu Hamamura. Satō described their contributions as being the first generation of writers for game magazines that were written by gamers instead of people from other fields.

Satō said that the magazine sold relatively poorly until around 1986. By 1992, the publication had a staff of 70 people with Kadokawa Shoten being considered a relatively small company within the publishing industry at the time. Satō left Kadokawa Shoten to work for MediaWorks around 1992. A major argument between the president of Kadokawa (Haruki) and its vice-president (Tsuguhiko) would develop around 1992 and 1993, which led Tsuguhiko to quit Kadokawa and start his own company MediaWorks. Months later, after Haruki was arrested on drug-trafficking charges in 1993, Tsuguhiko returned to control the company. This led to nearly all of its regular columns and ongoing manga in Comptiq to suddenly getting cancelled. The staff of the editorial department of Comptiq finished editing their final issue of the year, the New Year's 1993 issue, which was released on December 8, 1992, at the Kadokawa Media office at the end of November 1992. They then gathered became employees of MediaWorks for the February issue of the newly launched magazine, Dengeki-Oh which released January 8, 1993.

== Content ==
From the 1980s to around 1999, Comptiq content primarily consisted about computer games, while continuing to have some sections dedicated to Japanese idols, film and Family Computer game reviews, and tabletop role-playing games. One of the serialized articles started called Record of the Lodoss War. It was a collaborative project by a Dungeons & Dragons role-playing group called Group SNE led by Hiroshi Yasuda. The Lodoss Project started out as a transcript of playthroughs of their games. Around 1989, the serialization of Record of Lodoss War ended. Academic Marc Steinberg said that this series became one of the origins for what is today referred to as a light novel, a genre of Young adult literature, which would become one of Kadokawa would have 70-80% the market share of by 2017. Legend of Crystania began being serialized in the magazine around 1989.

Initially, the editorial department of Comptiq was against having manga published in the magazine. Tatsuo Satō said that they felt the magazine could not compete with Login in terms of regular game reviews and analysis and felt they had to create something different. This was against Kadokawa Shoten guidelines at the time that prohibited depicting female nudity, manga, and articles on scandals. Satō said that as this was the time Kadokawa began publishing Asuka magazine, so these rules were likely overlooked.

Around the release of Windows 3.1 the magazine began focusing on more articles on how to fine-tune their PC while still focusing on PC games. Following the release of Windows 95 in November 1995, there appeared more articles featuring voice actors, which laid the groundwork for the magazines later focus on bishōjo games and anime. In the 21st century, the magazine shifted focus from predominantly covering PC games to video game console dating sims and manga serializations which occupied over a third of its magazine.

=== Serialized manga ===
- .hack//GU+
- .hack//Legend of the Twilight
- Air
- D.C.: Da Capo
- D.C.S.G.: Da Capo Second Graduation
- Kishinhoukou Demonbane
- Eden's Bowy
- Eureka Seven: Gravity Boys & Lifting Girls
- Fate/Extra
- Fate/stay night
- Fortune Arterial
- Gunbuster
- Hero Legend
- HoneyComing
- Izumo 2
- Kakyuu Sei
- Kantai Collection
- Koha-Ace
- Listis
- Little Busters!
- Lucky Star
- Moon Quest
- Nichijou
- Phantom Brave
- Record of Lodoss War (role-playing game replay)
- Romancia
- Rune Wars
- Shuffle! Days in the Bloom
- Snow: Pure White
- Tōka Gettan
- The Tower of Druaga: the Aegis of Uruk Sekigan no Ryū
- Vagrants
- Yami to Bōshi to Hon no Tabibito
- Yoake Mae yori Ruriiro na
- Ys
