= Derby Stallion: Best Keiba =

- Developer: ASCII Corporation
- Publisher: ASCII Corporation
- Designer: Hiroyuki Sonobe
- Series: Derby Stallion
- Platform: Family Computer
- Release: JP: December 20, 1991
- Genre: Simulation

Derby Stallion: Best Keiba (Note: Japanese: ベスト競馬・ダービースタリオン, Hepburn: Besuto Keiba Dābīsutarion; lit. 'Best Horse Racing · Derby Stallion') is a 1991 simulation video game developed and published by ASCII Corporation for the Family Computer. The game has a player become a horse owner, where they raise, train, and bet on horse races with the ultimate goal of winning 12 major horse racing titles.

Derby Stallion: Best Keiba was developed by ASCII and was predominalty created by Hiroyuki Sonobe. While working at the company, he became a fan of horse racing and talked with a co-worker about creating a game that would include attributes of the sport beyond racing, such as breeding the best racing horse. Sonobe developed the game over three years, first developing the commentary, which he felt was the most exciting part of the sport and then the gameplay on breeding the perfect racing horse. He worked at the game even after leaving his job at ASCII, as he still had a desk available for him to work at the office.

Derby Stallion: Best Keiba was released on December 20, 1991 and sold well enough for ASCII that it was followed by an enhanced version of the game the next year for the Famicom. The original game received high scores in Famicom Tsūshin and Hippon Super! magazine, with players complimenting the game's realism and gameplay depth, while two reviewers in the former magazine noted it would only confuse non-horse racing fans.

The game became a series for ASCII, with nearly one Derby Stallion game made per year in the 1990s. Derby Stallion: Best Keiba would influence later video games, such as Yasuhiro Wada's Harvest Moon (1996) and Game Freak's Pocket Card Jockey (2013).

== Gameplay ==
Derby Stallion: Best Keiba is a horse race and horse breeding simulation game. In the game, the player becomes the owner of a horse and has to train and aim to win 12 major horse racing titles. The game primarily features races in the Kanto region of Japan.

The game has players buy mares, breed thoroughbreds, train horses and plan their racing schedules. The player can earn money in the game from winning races, which allows them to buy other mares.

== Development ==
Derby Stallion: Best Keiba was developed by ASCII. Takeshi Kaneda, a programmer who worked at the time at ASCII, said the company was more of a publisher than a game developer and mostly focused on tasks such as creating game manuals. It was made during a boom period for horse racing in Japan through the success of jockeys like Yutaka Take. While working on installments of the Besutopurēpuro Yakyū series, Derby Stallions's creator Hiroyuki Sonobe became hooked on horse racing which led to a co-worker suggesting to make a game about the sport that involved new elements such as breeding horses. Development took over three years. Despite leaving ASCII, Sonobe still had a desk at the company and continued to work on the game there.

Sonobe said he spent the first year crafting the commentary for the game, which he believed to be the most exciting part of the sport and wanted to capture the commentary style of former Kansai Television commentator Kiyoshi Sugimoto in the game. Sonobe said he was also influenced spoke by how commentary was handled in the video game Captain Tsubasa (1988).

The game was initially developed with the horse racing scenes, with Sonobe saying his own knowledge of horse racing increased, leading him to introduce bloodlines into the gameplay. The second year was spent on developing how to cross-breed horses. Initially, it was made to match a pedigree chart, but he then felt the game would only appeal to people with knowledge of horse racing, which led to the idea being scrapped.

ASCII developer Tsuyoshi Kaneda said Sonobe and his team struggled when trying to make Derby Stallion: Best Keiba a realistic horse racing game. The game uses real-life names for the studs that appear in the game, but had to settle for pseudonyms for the names of race horses. ASCII initially approached the Japan Racing Association (JRA) to use the names of real horses, which was accepted. The developer then sought permission from the horse's owners, a process that proved more difficult. Some owners did not want their horses evaluated using in-game stats, and further complications arose when some horses had their names trademarked by third parties. The franchise started using actual names of racehorses and jockeys with the release of Derby Stallion '96, five years after the release of Derby Stallion: Best Keiba. At the height of the series popularity, sports magazines in Japan, such as Number would publish interviews with gamers on how to breed the best horses.

== Release ==
Derby Stallion: Best Keiba was released on December 20, 1991 for the Family Computer and published by ASCII. Kaneda said that there were concerns at the time that Derby Stallion may not sell well due to its subject matter. Sonobe said that the first version of Derby Stallion had a print run of 50,000 copies, which sold out. Kaneda credited the sales to the promotional material from the marketing team at ASCII, as they were also horse racing enthusiasts.

Following the first print run being sold, development of an enhanced version of the game called Dābīsutarion Zenkokuban (Note: ダービースタリオン 全国版; lit. 'Derby Stallion: National Edition') began. This version of the game was released in August 1992 and adeed races in the Kansai region as well as allowing players to have stables in Miho or Ritto.

== Reception ==
Reception

Review scores
Publication	Score
Famicom Tsūshin	9/10, 6/10, 8/10, 9/10
Hippon Super!	9/10

In the Japanese magazine Famicom Tsūshin, four reviewers commented on the game. One reviewer commented that it best showcases how much fun a horse owner could have and that the gameplay was incredibly deep and addictive. A reviewer in Hippon Super! said that everything in the game is well done, specifically highlighting the game's realism, horse racing scenes, and surprisingly tender moments such as when a calf is born. The reviewer encouraged horse racing fans to buy the game over other hot properties in Japan at the time, such as The Legend of Zelda: A Link to the Past (1991) or Rie Miyazawa's book Santa Fe to attest to its quality.

Another reviewer in Famicom Tsūshin found the live commentary in the game exciting, but was concerned that it may be difficult to understand for audiences with no knowledge of horse racing. A third reviewer said the game would be completely incomprehensible to players who were not familiar with the sport and could only recommend it to its fans.

1992 version

Review score
Publication	Score
Famicom Tsūshin	8/10, 9/10, 8/10, 7/10

The Dābīsutarion Zenkokuban version of the game also received positive reviews from the Famicom Tsūshin critics.

Derby Stallion: Best Keiba was among the top ten highest average scores from Famicom Tsūshin in 1991 and was the second highest scored Family Computer game of the year, only beaten by Itadaki Street. Dābīsutarion Zenkokuban ranked among the ten ten highest scored games from the magazine in 1992 and was the only Family Computer game on the list. In Japanese newspaper The Yomiuri Shimbun, Dābīsutarion Zenkokuban was nominated in for their annual best game of the year list, being beaten by Street Fighter II (1991).

== Legacy ==
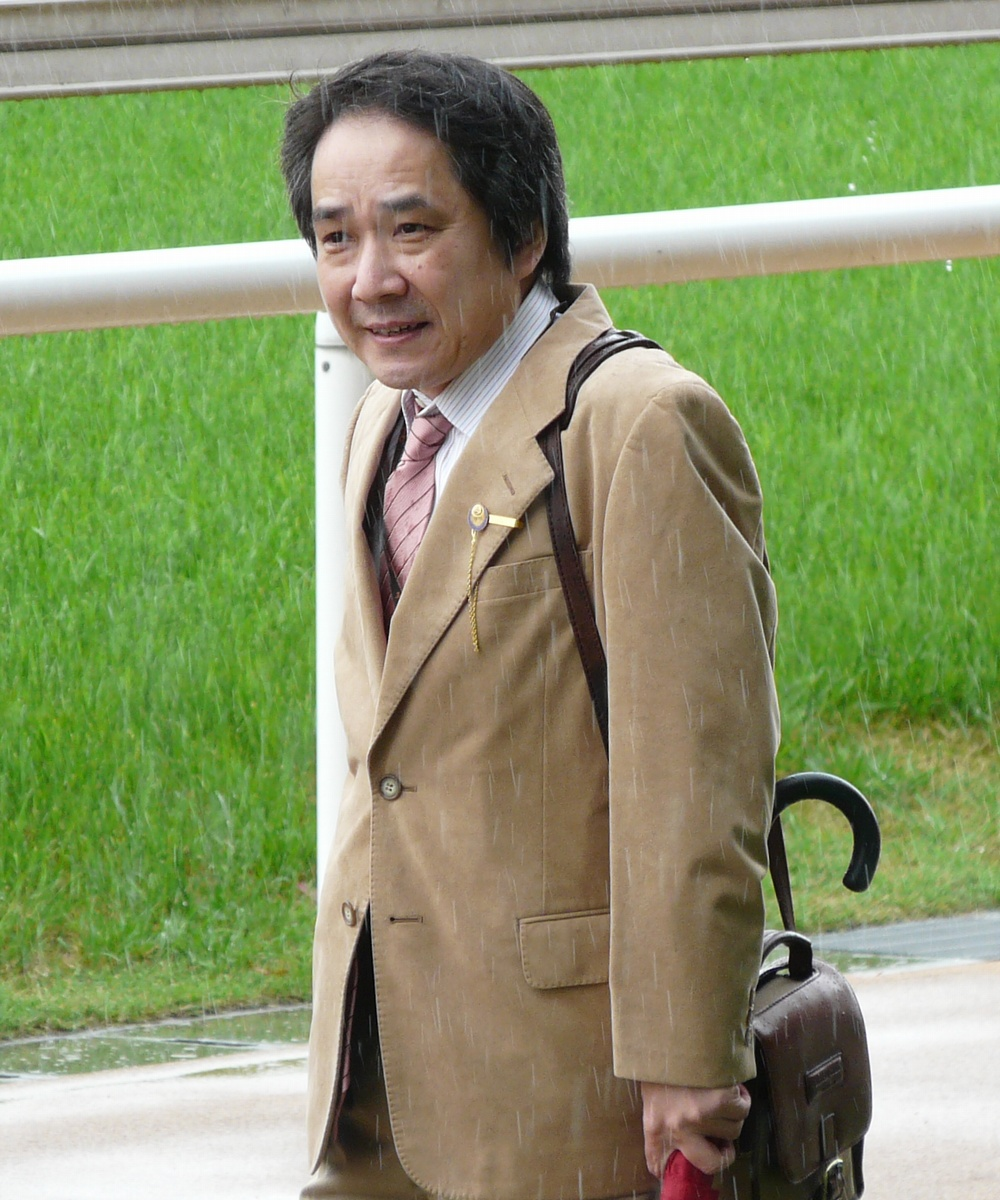
Derby Stallion: Best Keiba creator Hiroyuki Sonobe in 2011.

While other horse racing-themed games existed around the release of Derby Stallion: Best Keiba such as Namco's Famirī Jokkī (Note: ファミリージョッキー; lit. 'Family Jockey') (1987), a writer for Famitsu said that Derby Stallion: Best Keiba introduced new elements to these games through by adding racehorse training. This included new features such as being able to both breed and train racehorses.

Versions for Japanese personal computers followed after the release of the two Family Computer games, which included a multiplayer feature. Sonobe said that these PC versions and their added multiplayer format sparked major interest in the game, which led to the series' popularity. A sequel Derby Stallion II, was released in Japan for the Super Famicom on February 18, 1994. There was a new Derby Stallion nearly each year in Japan in the 1990s, which led to every member of the ASCII development staff working on the games.

Derby Stallion would influence other games, such as the farm setting in Yasuhiro Wada's game Harvest Moon (1996). Masao Taya, the director of Game Freak's Pocket Card Jockey (2013) said he became a programmer after playing Derby Stallion and getting involved with its online fan community. Hiroyuki Sonobe appears in Pocket Card Jockey as a character who has made a fortune from horse racing.

== See also ==
- List of Nintendo Entertainment System games
- Video games in Japan
