= Jun Henmi =

Japanese writer and poet

Jun Henmi 辺見 じゅん
- Born: Mayumi Kadokawa; July 26, 1939; Mizuhashi, Toyama Prefecture, Japan
- Died: September 21, 2011 (aged 72); Tokyo, Japan
- Occupations: Writer, poet
- Writing career
- Genres: Fiction, nonfiction
- Notable works: Otoko-tachi no Yamato; Shūyōjo kara Kita Isho

Mayumi Shimizu (清水 眞弓, Shimizu Mayumi; July 26, 1939 – September 21, 2011), known by her pen name Jun Henmi (辺見 じゅん, Henmi Jun), was a Japanese writer and poet. She was known for her works of fiction and nonfiction about people affected by World War II.

== Biography ==
Henmi was born in Mizuhashi (now part of Toyama City), Toyama Prefecture. She was the daughter of Gen'yoshi Kadokawa, founder of publisher Kadokawa Shoten and the older sister of Haruki Kadokawa.

Henmi won the Nitta Jirō Culture Prize in 1984 for her 1983 book Yamato: The Last Battle (男たちの大和, Otoko-tachi no Yamato; lit. Yamato of Men), about crew members of the Japanese battleship Yamato and their final voyage during Operation Ten-Go. The book was later made into a 2005 movie under the same title. Henmi also won two nonfiction literary awards for her 1989 work Farewell Notes from a Prison Camp (収容所から来た遺書, Shūyōjo kara Kita Isho) about notes received 10 years after World War II by the family of a man who died in a Russian prison camp in Siberia.

Henmi died on September 21, 2011, after collapsing in her home in a Tokyo suburb. She was 72 years old.
