= Hokkaido Rensa Satsujin: Ohotsuku ni Kiyu =

- Cover of PC-88 version
- Developer: Login Software
- Publisher: ASCII Corporation
- Programmer: Toshiyuki Ueno
- Writer: Yuji Horii
- Platforms: PC-6001, PC-88, PC-9801, FM-7, MSX, Family Computer
- Release: PC-6001, PC-88: JP: December 21, 1984; FM-7, PC-98, MSX: JP: 1985; Family Computer: JP: June 27, 1987
- Genre: Adventure

Hokkaido Rensa Satsujin: Ohotsuku ni Kiyu (Note: Japanese: 北海道連鎖殺人 オホーツクに消ゆ; lit.The Hokkaido Serial Murders: The Okhotsk Disappearance) is a 1984 adventure game. The game has a mystery-theme where a man's body is discovered floating in Tokyo Bay, and the ongoing investigation pulls various isolated story points into the reveal of the culprit.

The game was part of a trilogy of mystery games by Yuji Horii, with the first being The Portopia Serial Murder Case (1983) and the latter being Karuizawa Yūkai Annai (1985). Rather than having players type out their commands such as "Open the Window" as seen in the original version of The Portopia Serial Murder Case, players can choose menu options to select specific commands in Hokkaido Rensa Satsujin. The game was first released for the PC-6001 and PC-88 in December 1984 and for various other Japanese home computers in 1985. The game sold 15,000 copies across all home computer models.

The game was later ported to the Family Computer in 1987 and was aimed at a younger audience. The game introduced some changes to the plot of the game one-third of the way in, as well as featured new characters and new art-style. The game has received various remakes such as Okhotsk ni Kiyu 98 for home computers in 1992 and The Hokkaido Serial Murder Case: The Okhotsk Disappearance ~Memories in Ice, Tearful Figurine~ in 2024.

== Gameplay ==
Hokkaido Rensa Satsujin: Ohotsuku ni Kiyu is an adventure game. It uses a command-selection system for its gameplay, rather than having players type in commands for character actions. This allows for joystick control for all gameplay operations except when entering phone numbers or character names. As you gather information from various sources, the clues that were previously just isolated story points gradually begin to connect.

== Plot ==
In Hokkaido Rensa Satsujin: Ohotsuku ni Kiyu, a man's body is found floating at Harumi Pier in Tokyo Bay. Their identity is unknown. The setting moves from Tokyo to Hokkaido. Second and third murders occur one after another in Kushiro, Abashiri, Sapporo, Monbetsu, and Yubari.

There are two iterations of the game. The original version for home computers released in 1984 and 1985 and versions based on the Family Computer (Famicom) version from 1987 change the last third of the game feature new story content and a new identity of the culprit.

== Production ==
After working on The Portopia Serial Murder Case (1983), Yuji Horii branched into the genre of Japanese erotic games called eroge with Karuizawa Yūkai Annai (1985). While Horii worked on Karuizawa Yūkai Annai alone, he also worked on Hokkaido Rensa Satsujin: Ohotsuku ni Kiyu which was programmed by Toshiyuki Ueno. Ueno was a writer for Login magazine at the time. The game is considered the second game in a trilogy of mystery-themed games by Horii, which started with The Portopia Serial Murder Case and ended with Karuizawa Yūkai Annai. It became one of the only two games produced under the "Login Software" brand, with the other being Eiyū Yamato Takeru (1985).

Gameplay in the PC-98 version of Hokkaido Rensa Satsujin. The game features a new menu selection with shortcut to menu actions that can be driven by number inputs.

Location scouting for Hokkaido Rensa Satsujin took place in November 1983. Horii said that Hokkaido Rensa Satsujin took longer to create than Karuizawa Yūkai Annai, as it was a collaboration. Login published articles about the game's production status in 1984. Horii only focused on developing the story for this game. He focused on making the plot unfold in a way that reveals the entire scope of the mystery, rather than relying on the unexpected identity of the culprit as in The Portopia Serial Murder Case. The game features graphics that feature close-ups and wide shots that resemble a manga comic. Horii drew the storyboards in the game. Horii said he did not do this intentionally, as he said it just came out of a normal part of his workflow.

Rather than having players type out their commands as seen in the original version of The Portopia Serial Murder Case, players can choose menu options to select specific commands in Hokkaido Rensa Satsujin. Horii said this was done after seeing people struggle with the command system in the original game due to the various words that could be used for commands in Japanese, so he opted for this menu option.

== Release ==
Hokkaido Rensa Satsujin: Ohotsuku ni Kiyu was released in Japan on December 21, 1984, for the PC-6001 and PC-88. It was released the following year for the PC-9801, Fujitsu FM-7 and lastly the MSX line of home computers in 1985. While the PC-88 version uses a numeric keypad for input, the PC-6001 and MSX versions let players control the game with a full keyboard, including number keys. Shinichi Yamoto of 4gamer.net described the game as an extraordinary success for the computer game market in Japan was it was released with the game selling 15,000 copies across all PC models. This was during an era when selling 5,000 copies of a game would have it be considered a hit game.

The version released for the Family Computer, or Famicom for short, was aimed at a younger audience. The Famicom port featured character designs by illustrator Arai Kiyokazu, which changed the style from to a more shonen manga-like art style. An initial idea for this version of the game was to have a vehicle-themed game when moving from location to location. The last third of the game was rewritten with a focus on elaborating the character of Makiko. Other additions include a first-person maze section, as well as giving the game a full soundtrack. It was released on June 27, 1987.

A new character named Megumi was added to this version of the game. At Horii's suggestion, there is a secret in the game that allows the player to remove the bath towel from Megumi during the game. This led to debates among the developers on how to display her breasts. Initially, they planned to use a pink dot, but abandoned that idea and opted for one developer described as "a blank dot." Ultimately, depending on the configurations of the players television at the time, the dot appeared differently for players depending on their set-up.

=== Remakes ===
In 1992, a version with new graphics titled Okhotsk ni Kiyu 98 was published as a book bundled with the software as part of the Login Disk&Book series. This version features more realistic illustrations of the scenes and has a slightly different story in the latter half of the game that is based on the Famicom version of the title.

In the early days of mobile phone games, companies provided content such as wallpapers and game services for a fixed monthly fee. Versions of Hokkaido Rensa Satsujin were released in this format for various mobile services in Japan, such as i-αppli on October 15, 2002, and the following year on EZweb and J-Sky on June 18 and July 16, 2003, respectively.

A remake of the game titled The Hokkaido Serial Murder Case: The Okhotsk Disappearance ~Memories in Ice, Tearful Figurine~ was developed by G-Mode and released for home computers through Steam on September 11, and on the Nintendo Switch on September 12, 2024. The remake includes the Famicom port of the original game.

== Reception ==
Reception

Review score
Publication	Score
Famicom Hisshoubon	3/5, 4/5 (FC)

Reviewing the PC-88 version, writers in Login said that as long as players do not feel pressured to find the culprit they would be able to enjoy the game. They cautioned that some players may find it lacking in terms of gameplay and that the story may not appeal to younger players.

Reviewing the Family Computer version, one reviewer in Famicom Hisshoubon said that some elements were improved from the original computer game such as the reveal of the culprit not feeling as rushed. Another reviewer complimented the addition of background music, the movement of the screen saying that these novel elements would be appealing to players. The reviewer said that until now, they were not interested in adventure games, but became more drawn into this one due to the writing of Yuji Horii.

== Legacy ==
Gameplay of the Family Computer version of Hokkaido Rensa Satsujin. This version features a shōnen manga style that would become the standard art style for adventure games on the console.

At the time, most adventure games required players to manually input all commands, such as "Open the window," and had an element of word-finding. Hokkaido Rensa Satsujin: Ohotsuku ni Kiyu was among the early video games to utilize a command-selection form of menu selection in adventure games. While this form of menu selection was previously seen in earlier role-playing games, a small number of earlier adventure games such as Joshiryo Panic and Miko to Akemi no Jungle Adventure, Hokkaido Rensa Satsujin would only display the necessary commands when needed in the game. Japanese video game journalist Koji Fukuyama described it as creating a more formalized system for selecting commands in Japanese adventure games.

Using shortcuts for menu selections did not appear in the original The Portopia Serial Murder Case (1983), but was incorporated in later versions and ports such as the version for the Sharp X1.

The art style of the Famicom version of Hokkaido Rensa Satsujin became the standard art style for adventure games on the console.

== See also ==
- 1984 in video games
