= New Film Lexicon =

The New Film Lexicon (Hungarian title: Új filmlexikon) is a two-volume film lexicon edited by Péter Ábel, and published by Akadémiai iadó between 1971 and 1973.

== Background ==
The lexicon was completed by expanding the one-volume Film Encyclopedia published in 1964. An effort was made to correct the mistakes in the Film Encyclopedia. Besides new movie titles, 950 new names were added to the lexicon, including, among others, the names of screenwriters, and Brazilian, Spanish, German, Czechoslovak, and underground American filmmakers.

Unlike its predecessor, pictures were included in the lexicon instead of intertextual images. The data was obtained with foreign help, including from the Soviet Moszfilm, the Japanese UniJapan Film, embassies and foreign journalists, as well as from some directors (such as Erik Blomberg), personally.

== Criticism ==
One criticism was that the quality of the paper of New Film Lexicon was worse than that of its predecessor, and the placement of the photos was impractical. According to the weekly newspaper A Köztársaság, the predecessor of New Film Lexicon had "already published evaluations that seemed outdated even in its own time", and these were adopted one by one by the expanded edition a decade later. The author believed that in the case of the lexicon, which relied essentially on the work of one person, the publisher did not receive such effective help from the academy, due to the lack of a suitable academic institution, as with the other lexicons.

When the first volume was published, film historian Gyula Bíró complained that scholarship suffered a setback in the face of popularity, that there were too many actor biographies, and among them were many artists who Hungarian viewers could not have heard about, because their films were not shown in Hungary. At the same time, the biographies of prominent individuals were too short. Bíró assessed that the lexicon was too weak in terms of concepts, lacked basic terms, and the existing ones were not very scientifically formulated.
