= Karuizawa Yūkai Annai =

- Publisher: Enix
- Designer: Yuji Horii
- Platforms: PC-8801, FM-7, Sharp X1, PC-6001, MSX
- Release: PC-8801: JP: April 1985
- Genre: Adventure

Karuizawa Yūkai Annai (Note: Japanese: 軽井沢誘拐案内; lit.The Karuizawa Abduction Note) is a 1985 adventure game designed by Yuji Horii. It was the third and final game in his series of mystery-themed adventure games following The Portopia Serial Murder Case (1983) and Okhotsk ni Kiyu (1984). Karuizawa Yūkai Annai has players in the role of Shirou Sakaki who is visiting his girlfriend Kumiko Takagi. After Kumiko's sister fails to return from an errand, Shirou and Kumiko go out searching for her.

Karuizawa Yūkai Annai was released for various Japanese personal computers in the mid-1980s and later ported to various feature phones in the 2000s. Unusual for adventure games prior to 1985, the main character speaks in the Karuizawa Yūkai Annai. Horri said that as the game involves an interaction with a girl so he believed that having the playable character talk added more drama and to establish the girl's character. Along with Tokyo Danpa Street which was also published by Enix, it became one the first games to have protagonist characters who would speak spontaneously without interacting with other characters, which would be seen in later Japanese games such as Dōkyūsei (1992) and Yu-no (1996). Karuizawa Yūkai Annai also features some elements of role-playing video games that would appear in his next game Dragon Quest (1986).

== Plot and gameplay ==
In Karuizawa Yūkai Annai, the player controls Shirou Sakaki who is visiting his girlfriend Kumiko Takagi and her sister Nagisa in Karuizawa, Nagano. After Nagisa leaves for an errand, the couple find that she is still missing the next morning. Shirou and Kumiko start searching for her and eventually find her wallet on the side of a walking trail. Inside, they find money sa well as the Death tarot card. After investigating different areas around Karuizawa and talk to the locals, Shirou receives an anonymous phone call threatening him to return to Tokyo.

The game is divided into chapters. In the fifth chapter, the menu-command feature is swapped to a point-and-click interface with directional movement. Karuizawa Yūkai Annai also includes elements of role-playing games (RPGs) such as having a field map as well as having a battle section towards the end of the game.

== Development ==
Following work on The Portopia Serial Murder Case (1983), Yuji Horii would branch into the genre of Japanese erotic games called eroge with Karuizawa Yūkai Annai (1985). While Horii worked on Karuizawa Yūkai Annai alone, he also worked on Hokkaido Rensa Satsujin: Ohotsuku ni Kiyu which was programmed by Toshiyuki Ueno. Ueno was a writer for Login magazine at the time. Location scouting for that game was done in November 1983. Both games are part of Horii's trilogy of mystery games with Karuizawa Yūkai Annai being the final installment.

As the sole developer on Karuizawa Yūkai Annai, Horii said there he thought it all out in my head, wrote the program, drew the pictures he wanted for the game, and then added the dialogue. He said it took less time to develop than Okhotsk ni Kiyu which had more formal processes as a collaborative effort. Finding that adventure games were about having a player input something first and then having the computer respond, he thought it would be unprecedented to have a computer unilaterally initiate the interaction. Horii used a pen tablet draw the characters and used programmer Kazuo Morita coding routine which allowed for faster graphic loading capabilities than the regular "PAINT" command.

Unusual for the period, the main character speaks in the Karuizawa Yūkai Annai. Horri said that as the game involves an interaction with a girl so he believed that having the playable character talk added more drama and to establish the girl's character. Horii also including side-scrolling in the game to move the characters. He said was potentially influenced by the Western-made Ultima series at that time.

== Release ==
Karuizawa Yūkai Annai was published by Enix for the PC-8801 series of Japanese personal computers (PC) in late April 1985. The game was ported various Japanese PCs in the 1980s including the FM-7, Sharp X1, PC-6001 and the MSX. After its PC release, it was not ported to any video game consoles and only later ported to feature phones.

== Legacy ==
Game journalist Koji Fukuyama described Karuizawa Yūkai Annai as a game that is not often mentioned as being influential on later video games. He said that when viewed along with Tokyo Nampa Street its influence was more clear.

Before 1985, the protagonist in adventure games generally did not speak. This changed with The Portopia Serial Murder Case (1983) where the player is allowed to choose menu options that allowed for dialogue. Next was Square's The Death Trap (1984) which featured a protagonist who would speak spontaneously. The origin of adventure games where a protagonist speaks spontaneously without any narrative text is seen in both Karuizawa Yūkai Annai (1985) and Tokyo Nampa Street (1985). Horii would follow-up his trio of adventure games with the role-playing video game (RPG) Dragon Quest (1986). Karuizawa Yūkai Annai would feature an RPG-like battle system and map feature which would both be replicated for Dragon Quest.

Game journalist Koji Fukuyama said that this style of adventure game where a protagonist speaks to themselves without anyone to interact with would be later used in later games such as Dōkyūsei (1992) and Yu-no (1996).

== See also ==
- List of Enix home computer games
- List of eroge
