= Sabra (magazine) =

Japanese magazine (1999–2010)

Sabra サブラ
- Cover of the August 2008 issue

Sabra (サブラ, sabura) was a Japanese magazine published by Shogakukan between 1999 and 2010.

== Format ==
Sabra featured beautiful Japanese models and articles geared toward young men. Sabra Magazine was comparable to Maxim, FHM, and Stuff in the United States.

Although the magazine focused on gravure models (and no nudity), it also offered variety of news such as showbiz entertainment, gadgets, and people.

== Publication schedule ==
The magazine was published bi-weekly, starting from 11 May 2000 until 25 October 2007. However, on 24 November 2007 Sabra magazine began to be published monthly.

Aside from regular publication, Sabra also published several one-shot collection books in a magazine format focused on a single model or group of models throughout years.

Sabra magazine ceased publication in March 2010, only special edition magazine books are being published in print and the members only site.

== In popular culture ==
A Sabra magazine cover (Year 2004, issue 011) was used in the well-received video game series "Metal Gear Solid". In "Metal Gear Solid 3: Snake Eater", the cover of said Sabra issue was used as representation of the "book" item in-game. The item is utilized as a distraction in the game.
