= Unitalia Film =

Film magazine in Italy (1950–1957)

- Categories: Film trade magazine
- Frequency: Quarterly
- Founded: 1950
- Final issue: 1957
- Country: Italy
- Based in: Rome
- Language: Italian
- OCLC: 4123319

Unitalia Film was a film trade magazine which was published between 1950 and 1957 in Rome, Italia. Its subtitle was Rivista trimestrale dell'Unione nazionale per la diffusione del film italiano all'estero (Italian: Quarterly magazine of the National Union for the diffusion of Italian films abroad).

== History and profile ==
Unitalia Film was started in 1950. The magazine was started by a film trade organization, Unitalia Film, which aims at distributing of the Italian films abroad. It was headquartered in Rome. Giuliana Stramiglioli was the correspondent of the magazine in Japan. Unitalia Film folded in 1957.

Japanese film trade magazine, UniJapan Film Quarterly, was modeled on Unitalia Film.
