= Itadaki Street (1991 video game) =

Itadaki Street: Watashi no Omise ni Yotte tte
- Developer: Login Soft
- Publisher: ASCII Corporation
- Designer: Yuji Horii
- Programmer: Fukashi Omorita
- Series: Itadaki Street
- Platform: Family Computer
- Release: JP: March 21, 1991
- Genre: Board game
- Modes: Single-player, multiplayer

Itadaki Street: Watashi no Omise ni Yotte tte (Note: Japanese: いただきストリート 〜私のお店によってって〜; lit. Itadaki Street: 'Come and Visit My Shop') is a 1991 board game-themed video game developed by Login Soft and published by ASCII Corporation for the Family Computer. It is played with four players with any non-human players being controlled by the computer. The players roll a dice to move across the board and can purchase, invest as well as pay for goods at shops.

The game was designed by Yuji Horii, who was known for his work in the Dragon Quest video game series. The game was influenced by the board game Monopoly programmed predominantly by sole programmer Fukashi Omorita who spent three year developing the game. Omorita created the computer-controlled players personality based on the designed provided by illustrator Arai Kiyokazu.

The game was well received by the reviewers in the Japanese video game magazines Famicom Tsūshin and Hippon Super! on its release. The reviewers pronominally complimented the strategy involved in gameplay and that it was both fun to play with computer controlled opponents and human controlled ones. The game spawned the Itadaki Street video game series which had several sequels as late as 2017.

== Gameplay ==
Itadaki Street plays like a board game. Players roll a dice a move a number of spaces indicated across by the die across the board. The path taken in the board game is a loop which will have the player return to the starting point of the bank. The game can be played with up to four human-controlled players. If there are less than four human-controlled players, the computer controls the others.

Across the board are many shops. If the player lands on a shop that is not owned they can purchase it for themself. If another players lands on a shop that is owned, they got a "shopping fee" and have to pay the owner. When passing through the bank, the player can by shares of the any shop across the board. If a player lands on a show they own, they have the ability to invest more into the shop, which increases the shopping fee and the price of the shares of the shop. The goal of the game is to repeat this process and accumulate shops to win. If one player goes bankrupt, the game ends immediately and the current richest player wins.

== Development ==
The game design for Itadaki Street was by Yuji Horii, who was known for his work in the Dragon Quest video game series. The character design in the game was by illustrator and manga artist Arai Kiyokazu, who is known for serializing their comic Basikkun that appeared in Login and for over 10 years in Famicom Tsūshin (now Famitsu) as well as the caricatures of reviewers in the same magazine.

Masanobu Endo from Game Studio invited programmer Fukashi Omorita to work on the game as they could not hire anyone from their own studio to work on it. Omorita had previously worked at Namco, where he was in charge of programming for ports of games such as the MSX version of King & Balloon (1984) and the Family Computer (Famicom) version of Galaga (1985). Omorita was the only programmer for the game and created the personality for the characters in the game based on Kiyokazu's illustrations. He described the development period for the game to be very long with it taking about three years to create.

Initially the game had a complete map of America. The game was influenced by the board game Monopoly.

== Release and reception ==
Reception

Review scores
Publication	Score
Famicom Tsūshin	9/10, 8/10, 9/10, 8/10
Hippon Super!	8/10, 4/5

Itadaki Street was released for the Family Computer in Japan on March 21, 1991 and was published by the ASCII Corporation.

Four editors of Famicom Tsūshin reviewed the game. Two of the reviewers complimented its ability to make a strategic board game, with one saying that all earlier board games on the Famicom played just like simple dice games. Yoriko Kuriyama of Hippon Super! complimented the games ability to be engaging for novice and experienced and not just to be appealing to male players. She complimented that stock and other prices would rise and lower at different intervals, which were gameplay elements that would not be possible with an actual board game.

The reviewers in both magazines found the game fun with either computer or human-controlled opponents. Ichiro Tezuka of Hippon Super! complimented the quality of the computer's AI routines, saying most computer-controlled players in board played poorly in previous similar games. Kuriyama also complimented the computer-controlled opponents personalities, such as how they threw out insults to unsettle the player. Kuriyama commented that as all the computer players were between the age of 15 and 20, she wished for one that was older. Reviewers in Famicom Tsūshin generally found the game to be more fun when played with human players.

== Legacy ==
Itadaki Street would become a video game series with sequels on a variety of video game consoles including the Super Famicom and PlayStation. The first sequel was published by Enix with the rest of the sequels being published by Square Enix. The series had also had crossovers, such as Itadaki Street: Dragon Quest & Final Fantasy 30th Anniversary (2017) to commemorates the 30th anniversaries of both Dragon Quest and Final Fantasy.

Omorita said the experience on developing the first Itadaki Street over three years led him to be able to develop the Super Famicom version of Monopoly for Tomy in about three months.

== See also ==
- List of Nintendo Entertainment System games
- Video games in Japan
