= Kingu (magazine) =

Monthly general interest magazine in Japan (1924-1957)

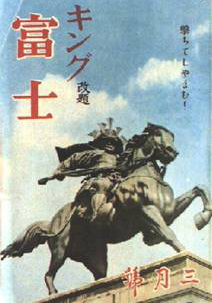
- Cover page of the 1943 edition
- Categories: General interest
- Frequency: Monthly
- Founder: Seiji Noma
- Founded: December 1924
- First issue: January 1925
- Final issue: 1957
- Company: Kodansha
- Country: Japan
- Based in: Tokyo
- Language: Japanese
- OCLC: 835840343

Kingu (キング; King) was a monthly general interest and entertainment magazine published in Tokyo, Japan, which existed between December 1924 and January 1957. It was the first popular best-selling Japanese magazine. It was also one of two most significant magazines in mid-twentieth century Japan, the other one being Ie no Hikari.

== History and profile ==
Kingu was established in December 1924. The first issue appeared in January 1925. It was the eighth magazine launched by Seiji Noma, the founder of the publishing company Kodansha. It was modeled on Saturday Evening Post and Ladies' Home Journal. The magazine was published by Kodansha on a monthly basis.

Kingu covered moralistic stories and featured articles about samurai heroics, sentimental romance and melodramatic events. The magazine was read by urban and rural men and women. Major contributors included Yoshikawa Eiji, Kikuchi Kan, Maki Itsuma, Funabashi Seiichi, Tateno Nobuyuki, and Tsunoda Kikuo. It ended publication in 1957.

== Circulation ==
Both Kingu and Ie no Hikari were the first Japanese million-seller magazines. Kingu sold one million copies in its first year, 1925. In 1928 the monthly circulation of the magazine was nearly 300,000 copies. The same year its total circulation was 1.4 million copies. Kingu sold more than a million copies again in 1927.

== Legacy ==
In 2019 Amy Bliss Marshall published a book named Magazines and the Making of Mass Culture in Japan in which she analyzed Kingu and Ie no Hikari to demonstrate the birth of mass culture in Japan. The author argues that these two magazines were instrumental in the establishment of mass culture and in the socialization in Japan.

The name of Kodansha's music subsidiary King Records was actually based from the magazine.
