= Family Computer Magazine =

Japanese video game magazine

- Cover of the first issue of Family Computer Magazine
- Categories: Video game
- First issue: July 1985; 41 years ago
- Final issue: 1998; 28 years ago
- Company: Tokuma Shoten
- Based in: Japan
- Language: Japanese

Family Computer Magazine (Japanese: ファミリーコンピュータMagazine, Hepburn: Famirī Konpyūta Magazine), commonly known as Famimaga (ファミマガ) for short was a video game magazine focused on Nintendo's Family Computer console. The magazine was published by Tokuma Shoten who had previously begun publishing similar video game magazines with Technopolis in 1982. Family Computer Magazine was released just after a boom period for the Family Computer in Japan with the release of Super Mario Bros. in 1985 as well as other major companies beginning to make games for the console.

Following the release of the magazine in 1985, three other Nintendo-dedicated magazines would appear from other publishers in Japan the next year with Kadokawa Shoten's Marukatsu Famicom, JICC Publishing Bureau's Famicom Hisshoubon and ASCII Corporation's Famicom Tsūshin. Towards 1990, Family Computer Magazine and Famitsu were often trading spaces with who had the more popular video game console magazine, with Famitsu eventually growing to review beyond Nintendo games. While Family Computer Magazine had made deals with Capcom and Konami to publish strategy guides to their games in the early 1990s, the magazine changed its name to Famimaga 64 to focus on the Nintendo 64 console and ceased publication in mid-1998.

== Background ==
Before the Family Computer the Japanese video game console market was predominantly populated by Pong (1972) and Breakout (1976) clones machines such as Nintendo's Color TV-Game series, poorly received Western imports like the Atari 2600 and Japan-made consoles like the Bandai Super Vision 8000 (1979) and the Epoch Cassette Vision (1981) which did not ignite a market for video game consoles. Nintendo released the Family Computer (or Famicom for short) in Japan on July 15, 1983. In the toy market, the durability of a hit product lasts for about two years, but the Famicom entered boom period in 1985 as several companies entered the Famicom game market and Super Mario Bros. (1985) was launched, selling 3.74 million units a year. A boom period occurred for the Famicom, with the number of companies that got involved in developing games to sell for the Famicom reaching their highest ever between 1985 and 1987.

This boom led to the number of people who played video games growing and the variety of games released. This created a demand for information and strategies for these games. Prior to the release of Family Computer Magazine, earlier video game magazines doujin and gamer communities had existed for personal computer (PC) and arcade games. People in these communities would write for Japanese magazines such as Mycom BASIC began to publish strategy guides in November 1983, while Login became an independent PC game magazine in April 1983. All this led to the release of a magazine dedicated to the Famicom.

== Publication history ==
Tokuma Shoten released the PC-focused video game magazine Technopolis in 1982. Tokuma Shoten would then first publish Family Computer Magazine, which became commonly known as Famimaga, in July 1985, which had a circulation of 120,000. It became the first magazine dedicated to the Famicom. The editorial office for Family Computer Magazine was located in Shinbashi.

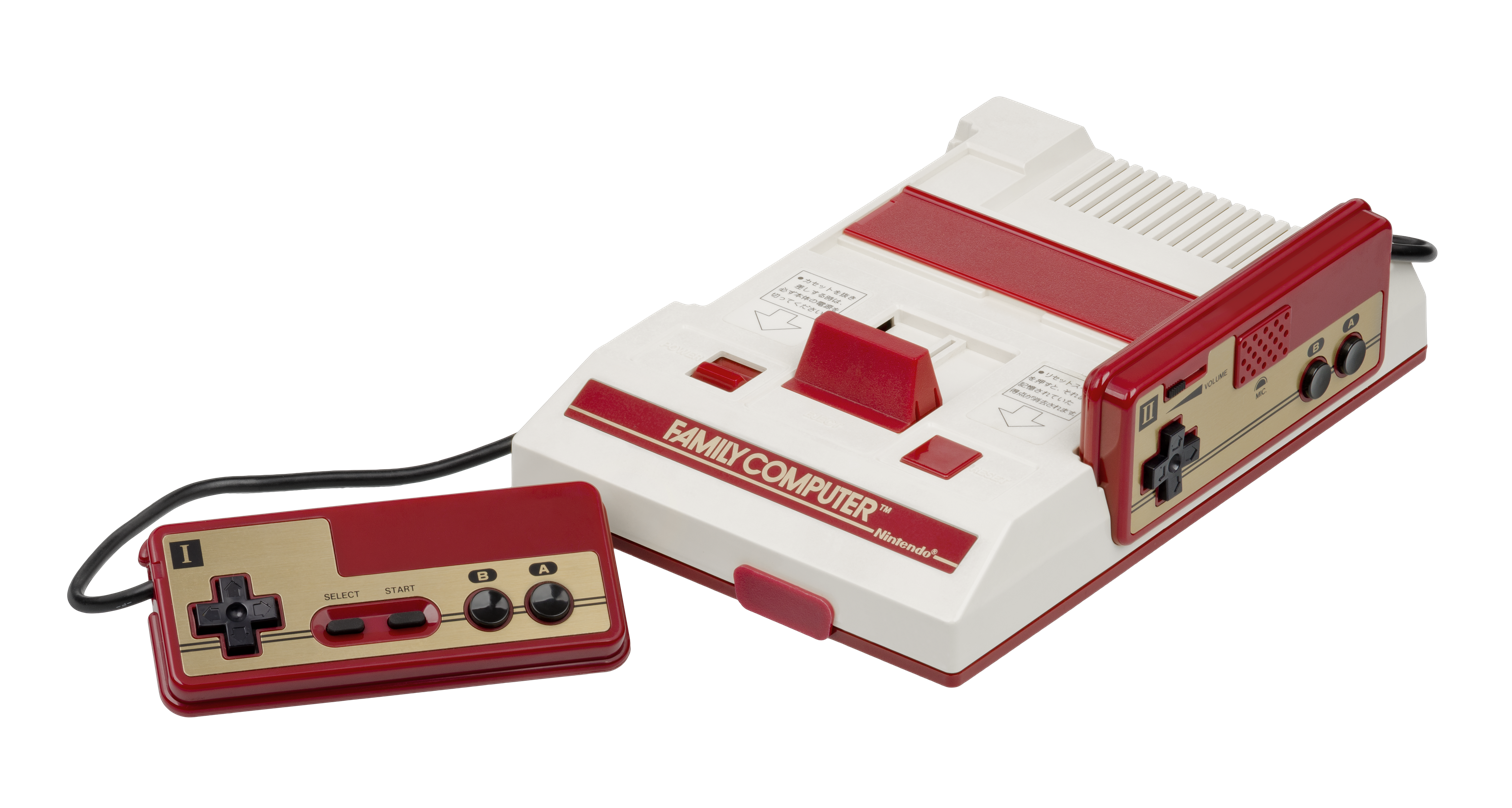
The boom in sales of the Family Computer in 1985 led to the development of Family Computer Magazine, which was initially just dedicated just the console.

Family Computer Magazine had an audience that was predominantly elementary school students in the 6th grade to mid-level junior high students. The magazine focused on making a magazine that was easy to understand so it could be readable even for early elementary school students by using ruby characters for their kanji in the magazine. Sales for the magazine would increase, with the magazine reaching 430,000 copies for its January 1986 issue.

Family Computer Magazine was released on the first and third Fridays of the month. As with other later magazines such as Famicom Tsushin (now known as Famitsu), editors often had a rivalry between the magazines. Gozo Shiozaki, who wrote in Famitsu as Tofuya Famibo, said that this was often due to their publishing schedule, where information would appear in Famimaga first. In some situations, when Family Computer Magazine broke news first, Famitsu would replace their articles with other material so as not to just repeat their content.

Towards the late 1980s, the popularity between Family Computer Magazine and Famitsu began to be neck and neck. When the Super Famicom was released, the popularity between the two magazines continued to teeter, with Family Computer Magazine's big advantage being that they had secured the rights to make strategy guides for Capcom and Konami, including a popular strategy guide for Street Fighter II (1991). By the early 1990s, Famitsu had established itself as a general-purpose handheld and console game magazine, while Family Computer Magazine was still focused only on Nintendo-based consoles. As time went on, the name Family Computer Magazine became a hindrance for the magazine as by the mid-1990s both the Famicom and Super Famicom were fast becoming obsolete consoles. The magazine eventually lost its market share to Famitsu. It changed its name to Famimaga 64 focusing on the Nintendo 64 and also launched a FamiMaga Weekly (ファミマガWeekly) to compete with Famitsu. FamiMaga Weekly only lasted six months. Famimaga 64 ceased publication with a combined May and June issue in March 1998.

== Content ==
Family Computer Magazine centered around information about new video game releases and game walkthroughs. Among their sections was the Uruwaza lit. 'Ultra Techniques' section which featured cheat codes and exploitable glitches in the games.

The first editor-in-chief of Family Computer Magazine was Takashi Yamamori. Yamamori was particular about headlines and layouts of the magazine and would thoroughly check the writers' rough drafts. After it passed this initial check, Yamamori would rarely make any changes to the text.

Family Computer Magazine had a policy among its editors not to create pages that involved interaction with its readers. This limited reader-generated content to being listed in "High Score" and gameplay strategy sections.

== Legacy ==
The initial success of Family Computer Magazine led to other magazines that were focused on console and handheld games. Three new magazines similar to Famimaga in 1986. ASCII Corporation created Famicom Tsushin (now known as Famitsu), which began as a section in Login in March 1985 to become its own unique publication in June 1986. Two other Famicom-focused magazines would follow, with Kadokawa Shoten releasing Marukatsu Famicom and JICC Publishing Bureau releasing Famicom Hisshoubon. During this period, the four magazines were sometimes known as the "Big Four Famicom Magazines".

The magazine was revived for a one-off issue by Tokuma Shoten for a one-off issue to commemorate the release of the Famicom Mini in 2016. A second one-off release of the magazine was released in October 2017 in conjunction with the release of the Mini Super Famicom.

Various issues of Famitsu and Family Computer Magazine were part of an exhibit at the Otaru City Literature Museum in 2022. The exhibit aimed to rediscover and show the charm of Japan's video game culture by focusing not on the games themselves, but on the writing that supported game culture behind the scenes.

== See also ==
- List of magazines in Japan
- List of video game magazines
