= The Portopia Serial Murder Case =

1983 video game

- Cover art of the PC-6001 version
- Developer: Yuji Horii
- Publisher: Enix
- Designer: Yuji Horii
- Writer: Yuji Horii
- Platforms: PC-6001, PC-8801, FM-7, FM-8, MSX, Sharp X1, Family Computer, Mobile, Windows
- Release: June 1983: PC-6001; JP: June 1983 MSX; JP: June 1985 Family Computer; JP: 29 November 1985 First mobile version; JP: 26 November 2001 (i-mode); JP: 3 April 2003 (EZweb); JP: 1 May 2003 (Keitai) Second mobile version; JP: 13 January 2005 (EZweb); JP: 19 July 2005 (i-mode); JP: 18 January 2006 (Keitai) Square Enix AI Tech Preview; WW: 24 April 2023
- Genre: Adventure
- Mode: Single-player

The Portopia Serial Murder Case (Note: Japanese: ポートピア連続殺人事件, Hepburn: Portopia Renzoku Satsujin Jiken) is a 1983 adventure game designed by Yuji Horii and published by Enix. It was first released on the NEC PC-6001 and has since been ported to other personal computers, the Family Computer (Famicom), mobile phone services, and most recently, Windows as Square Enix demonstrates their natural language processing technology.

In the game, the player must resolve a murder mystery by searching for clues, exploring different areas, interacting with characters, and solving item-based puzzles. The game features first-person graphics, nonlinear gameplay, an open world, conversations with non-player characters, branching dialogue choices, suspect interrogations, nonlinear storytelling, and plot twists. The Famicom version also features a command menu system, point-and-click interface, and 3D dungeon maze.

Upon its release, The Portopia Serial Murder Case was well received in Japan. It became an influential title, credited for defining Japanese adventure games. It became the basis for Horii's work on Dragon Quest. It inspired Japanese game designers such as Hideo Kojima and Eiji Aonuma.

== Gameplay ==
A crime scene in the PC-6001 version of the game

The Portopia Serial Murder Case follows a first-person perspective and narrative. The various events are described with still pictures and text messages. The player interacts with the game using a verb-noun parser which requires typing precise commands with the keyboard. Finding the exact words to type is considered part of the riddles that must be solved. While sound effects are present, the game lacks music and a save function. It features a conversation system with branching dialogue choices, where the story develops through entering commands and receiving answers to them from the player's sidekick or non-player characters.

The game features nonlinear gameplay, allowing multiple different ways to achieve objectives. This includes travelling between different areas in an open world and making choices that determine the dialogues and order of events as well as alternative endings depending on who the player identifies as the culprit. However, only one of the characters is the true culprit, while the others are red herrings; if the player closes the case with the wrong culprit, then the player will face criticism from the police chief and need to re-open the case. The game includes a phone that could be used to manually dial any number, which is needed to contact several non-player characters. The game also features an inventory system requiring the examination and collection of items, which could be used as evidence later in the game.

With no keyboard, the Famicom version replaces the verb-noun parser with a menu list of fourteen set commands selectable with the gamepad. This is similar to the command selection menu system introduced in Yuji Horii's murder mystery adventure game Hokkaido Rensa Satsujin: Ohotsuku ni Kiyu, which was released in 1984, in between the PC and Famicom releases of Portopia. One of the commands on the menu allowed the player to use a point-and-click interface, using the D-pad to move a cursor on the screen in order to look for clues and hotspots. The Famicom version of Portopia also features branching menu selections, which includes using the pointer as a magnifying glass to investigate objects, which is needed to find hidden clues, and as a fist or hammer to hit anything or anyone, which could be used to carry out beatings during suspect interrogations. Additional sequences were also added, notably an underground dungeon maze, with a style similar to role-playing video games.

== Setting and characters ==
Although the story of the game is fictional, it is set in real Japanese cities; mainly Kobe, in addition to a few sequences in Kyoto and Sumoto. The president of a successful bank company, Kouzou Yamakawa (山川耕造), is found dead by his secretary Fumie Sawaki (さわき ふみえ) inside a locked room in his mansion. Signs seem to indicate that Kouzou stabbed himself; however, the police sends a detective to investigate further.

The detective in charge of the case is an unnamed, unseen and silent protagonist who essentially embodies the player, and is simply referred to as Boss (ボス). He works with an assistant named Yasuhiko Mano (間野康彦), nicknamed Yasu (ヤス), who is the one who actually speaks and executes most of the player's commands. Other characters include, among others, Yukiko (ゆきこ), daughter of a man named Hirata (ひらた); Toshiyuki (としゆき), Kouzou's nephew and heir; and Okoi (おこい), a dancer.

== Development and release ==
The game was conceived by Yuji Horii around 1981, when he was 27 years old, shortly after he bought his first computer and learned to program with it by modifying other games. During this time, he read a PC magazine article about the rise of the text adventure computer game genre in the United States. Horii noticed the lack of such games in the Japanese market, and decided to create an adventure game of his own. Horii also cited the manga authors Tetsuya Chiba, Mitsuru Adachi and Katsuhiro Otomo as influences. The game was developed using the BASIC programming language.

Horii wanted to expand on the adventure game genre with his own ideas. One such concept was to create "a program in which the story would develop through entering a command and by receiving an answer to it." His idea was for "a game that progresses through conversations between a human and a computer." He "started to get more ambitious," and thought he "could make the computer converse" if enough data is entered, attempting to create an artificial intelligence language algorithm. However, he realized this was not possible on computers at the time, so he created "dialogue for the computer beforehand" where the player "could type in some words, and the computer would reply back with some reaction." Another concept was that, in contrast to other "very linear" stories in adventure games at the time, his idea was for branching, non-linear storytelling, where "the main scenario should only take up about 20% of the game's content, and the remaining 80% should be in response to the various actions of the player." However, due to PC memory limitations, he was only able to create several short branching scenarios, which he still found more interesting than one long linear scenario. He also conceived of a graphical format, with a picture on-screen representing what's happening and a command menu system to select an action, which later became the standard format for Japanese adventure games.

Following its 1983 release, the game was ported to various Japanese personal computers. A Famicom port was then released in 1985 and was the first adventure game to be released on that platform. The Famicom version was also the first collaboration between Yuji Horii and Koichi Nakamura of Chunsoft, before Dragon Quest. The Famicom version was programmed by Nakamura, who was 19 years old at the time. This version of Portopia changed the interface, adopting the command menu system that Horii created for the 1984 adventure game The Hokkaido Serial Murder Case: The Okhotsk Disappearance [ja]. Due to frustration with text-based entry, admitting he was never able to get very far in adventure games because of it, Horii created a command menu system for Hokkaido, which was later used in the Famicom version of Portopia. Horii also noted that, for the Famicom versions of both Portopia and Hokkaido, he wanted to make them appealing to a more mature audience, beyond the Famicom's typical younger audience. He was also playing Wizardry at the time, inspiring him to include a 3D dungeon maze in the Famicom version of Portopia. The game was never released in the Western world, largely due to its mature content, involving themes such as murder, suicide, fraud, bankruptcy, interrogation beatings, drug dealings, and a strip club. The lack of a Western release prompted ROM hacking group DvD Translations to develop an unofficial translation of the Famicom version.

The first mobile phone version of the game was branded as a part of a Horii Yūji Gekijō (堀井雄二劇場; "Yūji Horii Theater") trilogy along with mobile versions of The Hokkaido Serial Murder Case: The Okhotsk Disappearance and Karuizawa Yūkai Annai. It was released in 2003 on EZweb and Yahoo! Keitai services. It features a list of set commands similar to the Famicom version but also improved graphics, no free-moving cursor, and a save function. The games of the trilogy, which was retitled Yuji Horii Mysteries (堀井雄二ミステリーズ), were re-released in 2005 and 2006 on the same services. The second Portopia version possesses the same content as the first mobile one, in addition to updated graphics, background music, a bonus function obtained after completing the game, and a hint option which nullifies the ending bonus if it is used too frequently.

The game is also featured as Square Enix's AI technology preview for GDC 2023 featuring natural language processing functionalities such as natural language understanding and natural language generation. A public version was released worldwide on 24 April 2023 without the natural language generation features out of fear for the software being used to generate inappropriate content. It was poorly received by fans and critics.

== Reception and legacy ==
The Famicom version of The Portopia Serial Murder Case sold 700,000 copies. The game was well received in Japan for allowing multiple ways for players to achieve objectives, its well-told storyline, and its surprising twist ending. The Japanese press described it as "a game without game over" because "there was technically no way to lose." According to Square Enix, it was "the first real detective adventure" game. The game, along with Super Mario Bros., inspired Hideo Kojima, creator of the Metal Gear series, to enter the video game industry. He praised Portopia for its mystery, drama, humor, 3D dungeons, for providing a proper background and explanation behind the murderer's motives, and expanding the potential of video games. Kojima considers it one of the three most influential games he has played, with its influence evident in his games, including the Metal Gear series and Snatcher. The PC-6001 version of Portopia Serial Murder Case is included as a hidden secret in Metal Gear Solid V: Ground Zeroes and Metal Gear Solid V: The Phantom Pain. Portopia was also one of the first video games ever played by Nintendo's Eiji Aonuma, who went on to become the director of The Legend of Zelda series starting with Ocarina of Time. Portopia's influence is also evident in Horii's own later work, including the seminal role-playing game Dragon Quest, which used storytelling techniques and the menu interface from Portopia. John Szczepaniak of Retro Gamer considers it "one of the most influential games" as it was responsible for defining the visual novel genre, comparing it to the role of Super Mario Bros., Tetris and Street Fighter in defining their own respective genres (platform game, puzzle game, and fighting game, respectively).

In 2003, The Portopia Serial Murder Case ranked 19th in a poll to determine the thirty best Famicom games; the poll was conducted by the Tokyo Metropolitan Museum of Photography as part of its "Level X" exhibition. The English-language webzine Retrogaming Times Monthly compared the game to the later-released Shadowgate where the player must examine and collect objects and find their true purpose later on, and recommended Portopia to fans of "slower paced games that require [players] to think through puzzles". John Szczepaniak praised its pacing and quality of writing, and considers the gameplay and plot to be sophisticated for its time. He noted that it contains elements found in a number of later titles, including Déjà Vu, Snatcher, 428: Shibuya Scramble, and Nine Hours, Nine Persons, Nine Doors. 1UP also noted that Portopia is similar to ICOM Simulations' Déjà Vu released several years later. Nintendo's successful Famicom Detective Club series of adventure games were also inspired by Portopia. USgamer compared it to the later Police Quest adventure games and CSI television series, as well as classic Sherlock Holmes novels. According to Official Xbox Magazine, Portopia's features, such as point-and-click, murder mystery plot, open world, suspect interrogations, nonlinear gameplay, dialogue choices, and alternate endings, are "standard for 2015, but way ahead of its time in 1983", comparing it to L.A. Noire. Peter Tieryas gave Portopia a positive retrospective review, stating that, while its "influence is undeniable, it's the tragic back story, the strange vicissitudes the characters face, the uncanny freedom to investigate, and the haunting uncovering of the killer that makes it so special."

== Remake ==
On September 10, 2026, a remake titled Next: The Portopia Serial Murder Case was announced by G-Mode. It is set to release on March 4, 2027 in Japan for Nintendo Switch, Switch 2, and Steam.
