= Seiji Noma =

Japanese journalist and publisher (1878–1938)

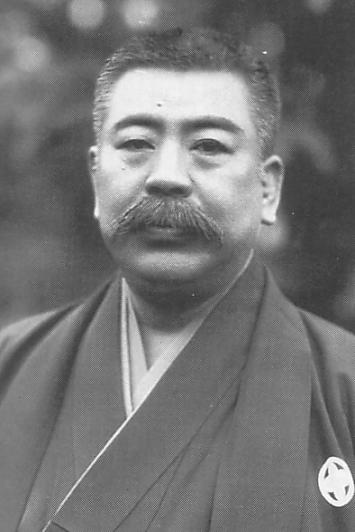
- Born: 1878
- Died: 1938 (aged 59–60); Tokyo, Japan
- Occupation: Journalist
- Known for: Founder of Kodansha

Seiji Noma (野間 清治; 1878–1938) was a Japanese writer and publisher who was the founder of Kodansha, a leading publishing company, which his family still wholly own today. He was the founder and publisher of many well-known newspapers and magazines.

== Early life and education ==
Noma was born in 1878. His father hailed from a samurai family and was himself a samurai.

Noma was educated as a teacher.

== Career ==
Following his graduation Noma worked as a teacher in the Luchu Islands. Later he served as a schoolmaster. Then he began to work as an administrative official at the Imperial University's law department in Tokyo.

Noma established a publishing company, Dainippon Yūbenkai (Japanese: the Great Japanese Oratorical Society), in 1910. The company would be later renamed as Dainippon Yūbenkai-Kodansha, which later be shortened as simply Kodansha. The first publication of the company was Yūben, a monthly magazine on public speech.

The nine magazines Noma started enjoyed high levels of circulations and were very influential on the popular culture of Japan. His goal in starting these titles was to modernize, entertain and educate Japanese society. On the other hand, they comprised the 75% of the total circulation of all Japanese publications. These publications included Kōdan Club (from which Kodansha is named for), Shōnen Club, Omoshiro Club, Gendai (Japanese: Present Generation), Fujin Club, Shōjo Club and Kingu. The latter was his flagship magazine which was identified with the company. In 1930 he established Hochi Shimbun (Japanese: Intelligence Newspaper) which also became an influential publication.

== Personal life and death ==
Noma's wife was a teacher. He died of heart attack in Tokyo on 18 October 1938.

== See also ==
- Noma Literary Prize
