= Georges Ferdinand Bigot =

French cartoonist, illustrator and artist

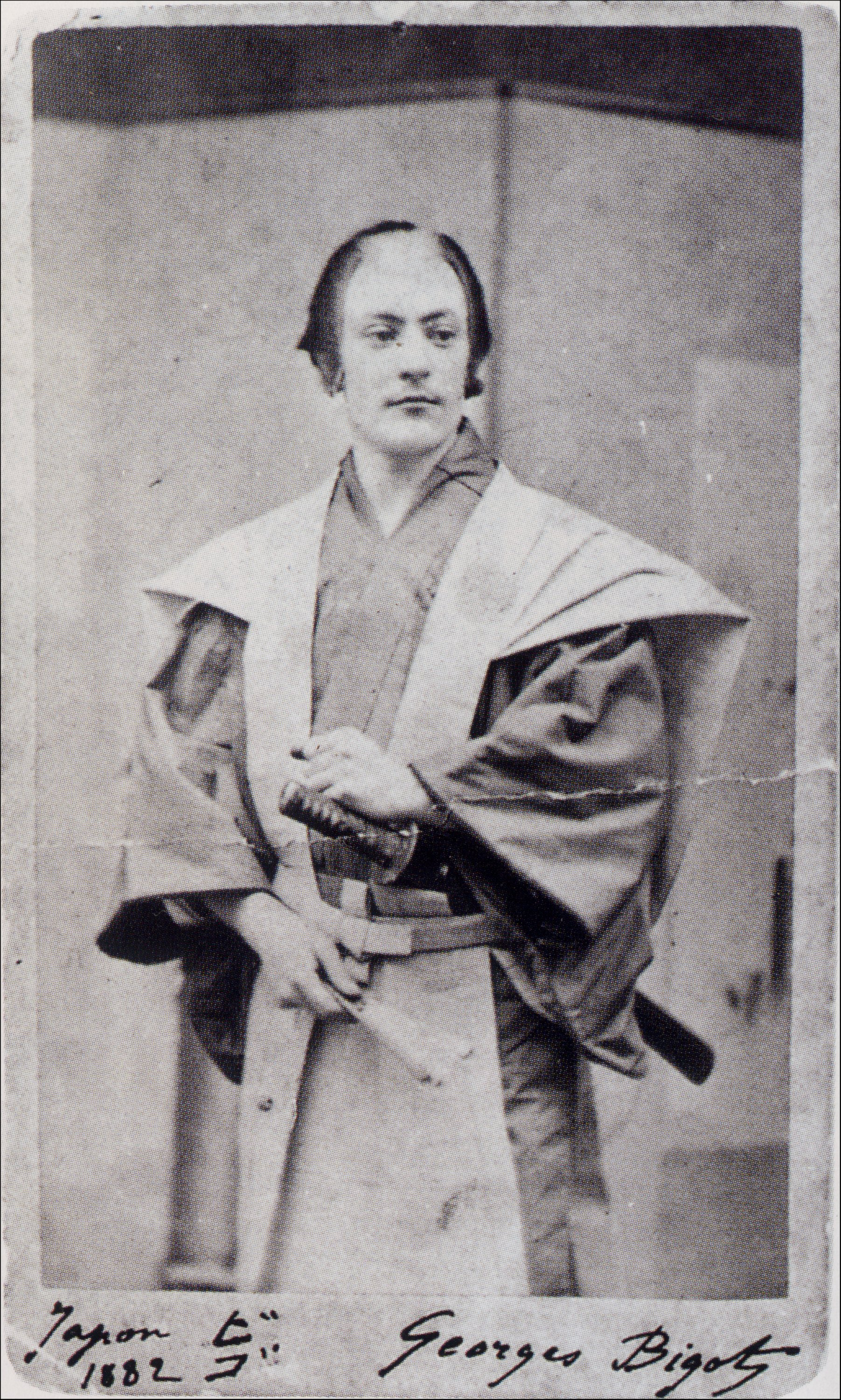
- Bigot in 1882
- Born: 7 April 1860; Paris, France
- Died: 10 October 1927 (aged 67); Bièvres, Essonne, France
- Occupations: artist, cartoonist

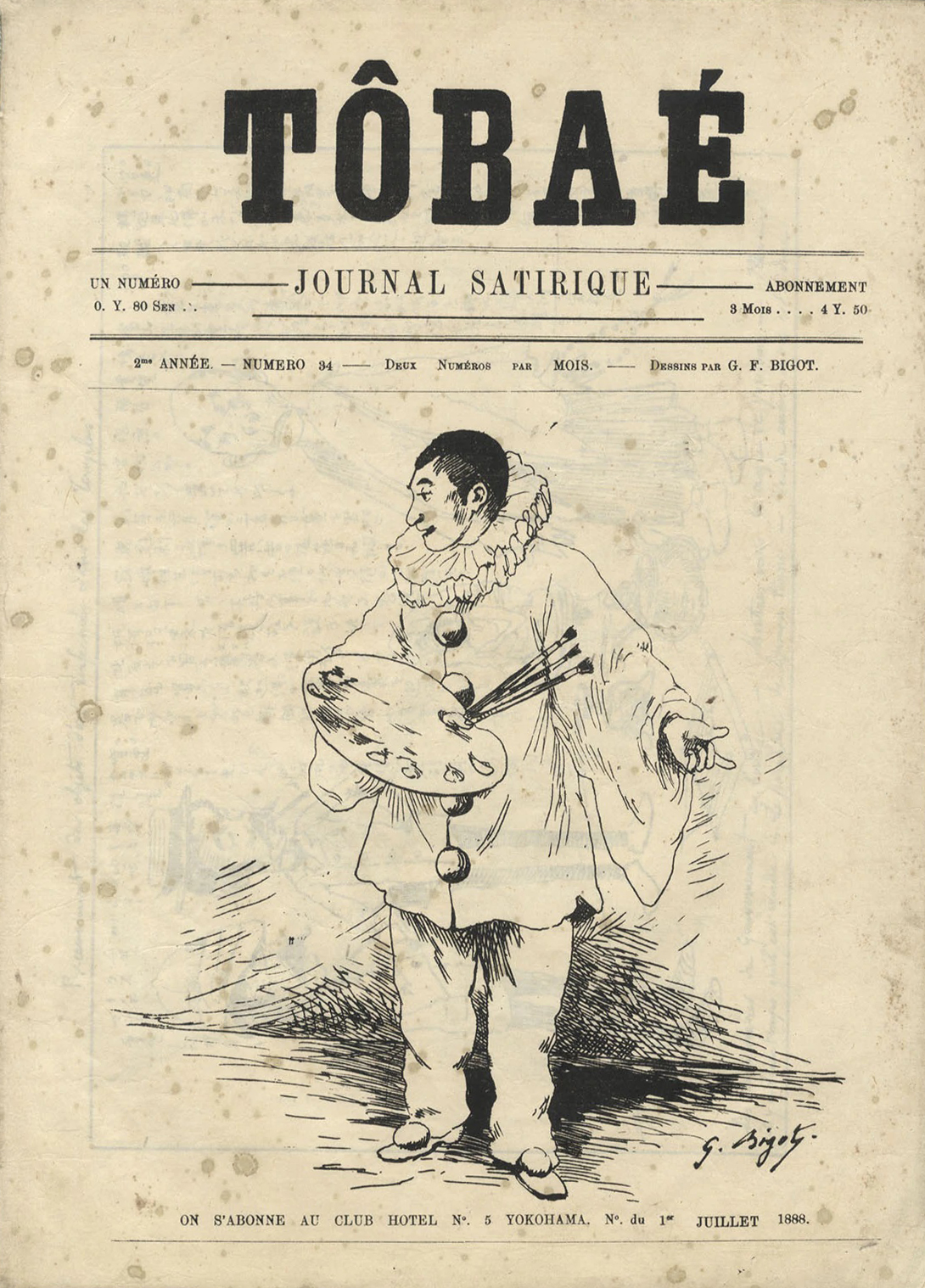
Cover of TÔBAÉ, n^{o}34, 1888.

Georges Ferdinand Bigot (French: [ʒɔʁʒ fɛʁdinɑ̃ biɡo]; 7 April 1860 – 10 October 1927) was a French cartoonist, illustrator and artist. Although almost unknown in his native country, Bigot is famous in Japan for his satirical cartoons, which depict life in Meiji period Japan.

== Biography ==
Bigot was born in the 5th arrondissement of Paris, France and was encouraged into the arts by his mother. At the age of twelve, he was accepted by the École des Beaux-Arts in Paris, where he was trained by artists such as Jean-Léon Gérôme and Carolus-Duran. While in school, Bigot was introduced to Japonism and befriended a number of collectors of Japanese art. He was also impressed with the Japanese pavilion at the Exposition Universelle (1878), all of which aroused in him a strong interest to move to Japan. In order to pay for the trip, he became an illustrator for newspapers, La Vie Moderne and The World Parisien and sold illustrations for Émile Zola's novel Nana. Bigot arrived in Yokohama in 1882. On arrival, he took lessons in the Japanese language and Japanese painting, and taught watercolor painting to students at the Imperial Japanese Army Academy as an oyatoi gaikokujin. He also sold illustrations to Japanese newspapers, and issued an illustrated book Japanese Sketches.

On the expiry of his government teaching job, he found employment as a French language teacher at a school run by the writer and liberal political philosopher Nakae Chōmin. He also traveled extensively around Japan. In 1887, Bigot published a satirical magazine, Tōbaé, in which he illustrated mostly scenes of everyday Japanese life, but also ridiculed Japanese politicians and what he felt to be excesses of in the Westernization of Japan. The newspaper had to be published in Yokohama for fear of Japanese censors. During the First Sino-Japanese War (1894-1895), Bigot traveled to Korea on special assignment from the British magazine The Graphic.

In 1895, Bigot married Masu Sano and fathered a son named Maurice. However, with the revision of the unequal treaties and the end of extraterritoriality in Japan in 1899, Bigot decided to return to France. He divorced his wife, but kept custody of their son. After his return to France, he worked for Le Chat Noir and other French magazines and newspapers. He also provided cartoons depicting the Second Boer War and the Russo-Japanese War. On retirement, he moved to Bièvres, Essonne, where he died in 1927.

== See also ==
- Charles Wirgman
