= Derby Stallion =

- Genres: Horse racing Business simulation
- Developers: ASCII (1991–1996); ParityBit (1997–2014); Land Ho! (2020)
- Publishers: ASCII (1991–2000); Nintendo (98); Media Factory (64); Enterbrain (2002–2008); Kadokawa (Gold); Game Addict (2020)
- Creator: Hiroyuki Sonobe
- Artist: Susumu Matsushita
- First release: Derby Stallion: Best Race: JP: December 21, 1991
- Latest release: Derby Stallion 2: JP: September 24, 2026

Derby Stallion (ダービースタリオン, Dābī Sutarion) - also known in Japan by the portmanteau abbreviation DerbyStal (ダビスタ, DabiSuta) - is a series of genre-merging horse-racing and business simulation games originally created by ASCII. First released in December 1991, the series sold 6 million copies in Japan by 1999.

== Gameplay ==
The ultimate goal of the player in the Derby Stallion games is to win the title of GI (Group I) Racer. To do this, the player must attempt to develop the greatest stock of horses that they can in order to have the greatest chance at each of the weekday and holiday races that compose the 1-year racing schedule of the fictitious "SRA" (an abbreviation of Sonobe Racing Association) group. Between races, the player engages in numerous business simulation, farm simulation, and role-playing activities.

Derby Stallion games have evolved as newer members of the series have been added, allowing players greater and greater control over every aspect of the horse-raising business. As such, the player must now race horses and place racing bets, manage the working of a stables and/or ranch, select different studs and broodmares for breeding, learn to break and train horses, and set up advantageous horse trades or sales, among other duties. Players must also make critical decisions about appropriate ages to race horses, breeds to pursue, and the timing of events to coincide with race dates. As the player improves the stock of their horses, their racing statistics, and their position in the world of the horse business, their Group Ranking increases until they reach the goal of Group I at which point they have won the game. The games also allow the player to continue playing after the top goal has been met.

Derby Stallion games all feature a single-player mode, however much effort has been put into making the games as versatile as possible for multiplayer capabilities. Multiplayer functions allow players to trade or complete sales between themselves, to set up breeders' agreements, and to race against opponents. To accomplish this, various methods have been used to exchange data from the earliest password code exchange to online connectivity with PCs, Satellaview exchange (via 8MB memory packs and slotted application cartridge), and Randnet service. Other methods of data exchange that have been developed include telephone satellite connections for players using DoCoMo phones.

== Series ==
Name	Release date	Systems
Derby Stallion: Best Keiba (ベスト競馬・ダービースタリオン)	December 21, 1991	Famicom
Dābīsutarion Zenkokuban (ダービースタリオン 全国版)	August 29, 1992	Famicom
Derby Stallion PC-9800 Series Edition (ダービースタリオンPC-9800シリーズ版)	June 1993	PC-9800
Derby Stallion DOS/V Edition (ダービースタリオンDOS/V版)	September 28, 1993	DOS/V
Derby Stallion II (ダービースタリオンII)	February 18, 1994	Super Famicom
Derby Stallion FM-TOWNS Edition (ダービースタリオンFM-TOWNS版)	February 18, 1994	FM Towns
Derby Stallion EX (ダービースタリオンEX)	September 30, 1994	PC-9800
Derby Stallion Macintosh Edition (ダービースタリオンMacintosh版)	November 26, 1994	Macintosh
Derby Stallion III (ダービースタリオンIII)	January 20, 1995	Super Famicom
Derby Stallion '96 (ダービースタリオン96)	March 15, 1996	Super Famicom-Satellaview
Derby Stallion (ダービースタリオン)	July 17, 1997	PlayStation
Derby Stallion '98 (ダービースタリオン98)	September 1, 1998	Super Famicom-Nintendo Power
Derby Stallion (ダービースタリオン)	March 25, 1999	Sega Saturn
Derby Stallion '99 (ダービースタリオン99)	September 30, 1999	PlayStation
Derby Stallion for Windows (ダービースタリオン for Win)	May 26, 2000	Microsoft Windows
Derby Stallion 64 (ダービースタリオン64)	August 10, 2001	Nintendo 64
Derby Stallion Advance (ダービースタリオンアドバンス)	December 6, 2002	Game Boy Advance
Derby Stallion '04 (ダービースタリオン04)	April 22, 2004	PlayStation 2
Derby Stallion for DoCoMo (ダービースタリオン for DoCoMo)	Winter 2005	DoCoMo
Derby Stallion P (ダービースタリオンP)	July 27, 2006	PSP
Derby Stallion DS (ダービースタリオンDS)	June 26, 2008	Nintendo DS
Derby Stallion (ダービースタリオン)	Cancelled	PlayStation 3
Derby Stallion Gold (ダービースタリオン Gold)	December 4, 2014	Nintendo 3DS
Derby Stallion (ダービースタリオン)	December 3, 2020	Nintendo Switch
Derby Stallion 2 (ダービースタリオン2)	September 24, 2026	Nintendo Switch 2

== Reception ==
Derby Stallion: Best Race topped the Japanese Famitsu sales chart in June 1992.

Derby Stallion III sold 1.2 million copies and Derby Stallion '96 sold 1.1 million copies. According to Weekly Famitsu, the 1997 Derby Stallion for the PlayStation was Japan's third-best-selling game of 1997, with sales of 1.58 million units. Derby Stallion '99 sold 1.1 million copies.
