= Ie no Hikari =

Japanese monthly family magazine

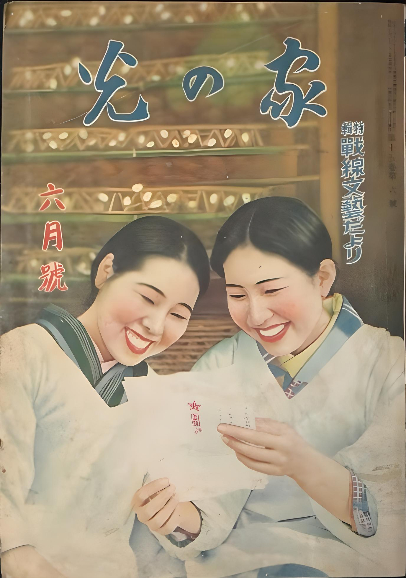
- Cover of a 1939 edition
- Categories: Family magazine
- Frequency: Monthly
- Publisher: Ie no Hikari Association
- Founded: 1925
- Country: Japan
- Based in: Tokyo
- Language: Japanese
- Website: https://www.ienohikari.net/
- OCLC: 649014893

Ie no Hikari (Japanese: 家の光, romanized: ie no hikari, lit. 'Light in Home') is a monthly Japanese family magazine published in Tokyo, Japan. It is one of the oldest and best-selling magazines in the country. In addition, it is one of two most popular magazines in Japan during the mid-twentieth century, the other one being Kingu magazine. Both are the first Japanese million-seller magazines.

== History and profile ==
Ie no Hikari was established in 1925. Shimura Gentarō and Arimoto Hideo, leaders of the Industrial Cooperative, were instrumental in the foundation of the magazine. At the initial period the magazine was controlled by the ministry of agriculture and forestry, and was published by the Industrial Cooperative. The magazine targets rural readers. However, it has another version for urban readers. It supports for agrarianism and features articles on home economics, children's stories and news. During the 1930s it covered articles on Manchuria Crisis in parallel to the official views of the government. In 1933 the magazine serialized a novel by Toyohiko Kagawa, Chichi to Mitsu no Nagaruru Sato (Japanese: A village where milk and honey flow). It was about the implementation of cooperative insurance.

The magazine is part of and published by Ie-No-Hikari Association, founded in 1944 as part of Central Industrial Union, which was later renamed as Central Union of Agricultural Cooperatives. The magazine has its headquarters in Tokyo.

== Circulation ==
During the last half of 1931 the circulation of Ie no Hikari was 150,000 copies which reached more than 500,000 copies by December 1933. In 1935 the magazine was read by a million people in the country. It managed to keep this rate until 1944.

In 1994 Ie no Hikari sold 983,736 copies.

Ie no Hikari had a circulation of 586,572 copies in 2010 and of 582,983 copies in 2011. In 2012 it was the sole Japanese magazine enjoyed circulation of half a million copies. It was the sixth best-selling magazine in Japan between October 2014 and September 2015 with a circulation of 569,359 copies.

== Legacy ==
In 2019 Amy Bliss Marshall published a book named Magazines and the Making of Mass Culture in Japan in which she analysed Kingu and Ie no Hikari to demonstrate the birth of mass culture in Japan. The author argues that these two magazines were instrumental in the establishment of mass culture and in the socialization in Japan.
