= Beads Friend =

Japanese quarterly beadwork magazine

- Categories: Beadwork
- Frequency: Quarterly
- Publisher: Boutique Co. (ブティック社, Butikkusha)
- Founded: 2003
- Country: Japan
- Based in: Tokyo
- Language: Japanese

Beads Friend (Japanese: ビーズ フレンド, Hepburn: Bīzu Furendo) is a Japanese quarterly beadwork magazine published by Boutique Co. (ブティック社, Butikkusha) since 2003. The magazine has its headquarters in Tokyo. It targets women.

== See also ==
- Arts and crafts
- Bead
- Decorative arts
- Jewelry designer
