= Hiragana Times =

Japanese bilingual magazine

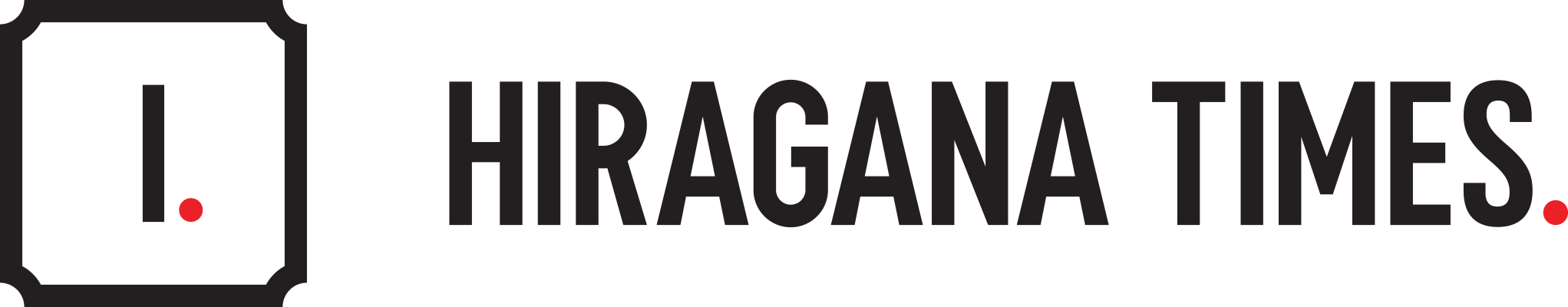
- Editor-in-chief: TARUISHI Koji
- Categories: Language education
- Frequency: Monthly
- Circulation: 15,000 (including app users)
- First issue: 1986
- Company: Hiragana Times Co., Ltd.
- Country: Japan
- Language: Japanese, English
- Website: hiraganatimes.com
- ISSN: 1348-7906

Hiragana Times (ひらがな タイムズ) is a bilingual English-Japanese magazine published in Japan since 1986 and targeting an audience of foreigners residing in Japan.

== Background and profile ==
The name of Hiragana Times was inspired by the fact that all kanji in the magazine have hiragana translations adjacent to it. This is known as furigana, and it allows more novice readers to comprehend the articles in both languages.

The magazine is published monthly and contains articles of cultural importance to its readers, focusing on Japanese language and culture with bilingual content in Japanese and English.
