= Yūben =

Oratory magazine in Japan (1910–1941)

- Categories: Oratory magazine
- Frequency: Monthly
- Publisher: Dainihon Yūbenkai
- Founder: Seiji Noma
- Founded: 1910
- First issue: February 1910
- Final issue: 1941
- Country: Japan
- Based in: Tokyo
- Language: Japanese

Yūben (雄辯; Eloquence) was a Japanese monthly magazine which focused on public speaking. It was in circulation in Tokyo between 1910 and 1941 and gained popularity among different sectors of the Japanese society.

== History and profile ==
Yūben was launched by Seiji Noma in 1910 as a monthly magazine, and its first issue appeared in February that year. Noma was also the founder of the publishing house Kodansha which was first named Dainihon Yūbenkai (Japanese: the Great Japanese Oratorical Society). Yūben was the first magazine started by the company. The goal of Yūben was to improve the self-expression ability of young people which was considered to be significant for democracy. Therefore, the magazine provided scholarly and popular articles about oratory and published the texts of the speeches by orators who included Abraham Lincoln, William Jennings Bryan and Theodore Roosevelt.

Yūben also featured articles in regard to the historical significance of public speaking and its impacts on the modernization of Japan. These articles were both instructive and entertaining. The first issue of Yūben had a circulation of 14,000 copies. Over time it became very popular among intellectuals, politicians, and university student and read by nearly all politicians of the period. The first issue of the magazine was edited by the academics from Tokyo Imperial University. The contributors of the following issues were individuals from various public and private institutions. In the period between 1930 and 1935 the magazine organized 14 comprehensive debates where university students publicly discussed the common problematic political topics of the period, including capital punishment and international marriage. Yūben folded in 1941.
