= Kodansha =

Japanese publishing company

Kodansha Ltd.
- Logo used since 2021

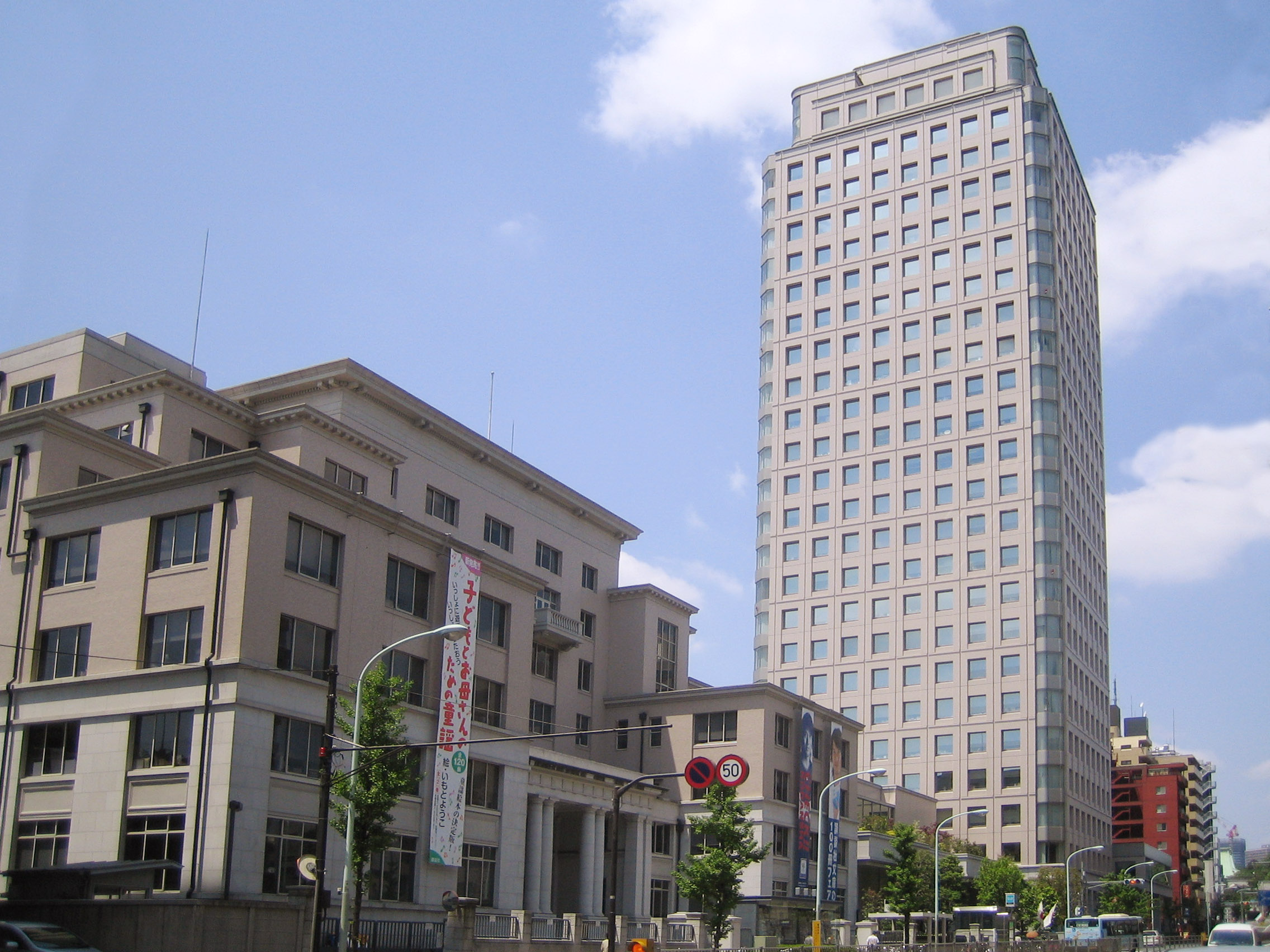
- Headquarters in Bunkyō, Tokyo
- Native name: 株式会社講談社
- Romanized name: Kabushiki gaisha Kōdansha
- Formerly: Dainippon Yubenkai-Kodansha (1911–1958)
- Type: Family-owned private KK
- Industry: Publishing
- Founded: November 1909; 117 years ago (as Dai Nippon Yūbenkai)
- Founder: Seiji Noma
- Headquarters: Otowa, Bunkyō, Tokyo, Japan
- Area served: Worldwide
- Key people: Yoshinobu Noma (president and CEO)
- Products: Books, light novels, magazines, manga and comics
- Owner: Noma family (Noma Cultural Foundation 39.2%)
- Number of employees: 914 (as of September 2013)
- Subsidiaries: Kodansha Beck; Kodansha Publishing; Kodansha IP; Kodansha VR Lab; Kodansha Tech; Takakenkyu-sha; Kobunsha; Nikkan Gendai; Ichijinsha; Star Seas Company; Wani Books; King Records; Kodansha USA; Kodansha Europe; Kodansha Beijing Culture; Kodansha Taiwan Media Group
- Website: www.kodansha.co.jp; www.kodansha.co.jp/company

Kodansha Ltd. (Japanese: 株式会社講談社, Hepburn: Kabushiki-gaisha Kōdansha) is a Japanese privately held publishing and music company headquartered in Bunkyō, Tokyo. Kodansha publishes manga magazines including Nakayoshi, Morning, Afternoon, Weekly Young Magazine, Weekly Shōnen Magazine, and Bessatsu Shōnen Magazine, as well as the more literary magazines Gunzō and Shūkan Gendai, as well as the Japanese dictionary Nihongo Daijiten. Kodansha was founded by Seiji Noma in November 1909, and members of his family continue as its owners either directly or through the Noma Cultural Foundation.

== History ==
Seiji Noma, member of the Noma family who founded Kodansha in November 1909 as a spin-off of the Dai-Nippon Yūbenkai (大日本雄辯會, "Greater Japan Oratorical Society") and produced the literary magazine Yūben (雄辯) as its first publication. The name Kodansha (taken from Kodan Club (講談倶楽部), a now-defunct magazine published by the company) originated in 1911 when the publisher formally merged with the Dai-Nippon Yūbenkai. The company has used its current legal name since 1958. It uses the motto Omoshirokute, tame ni naru (面白くて、ためになる; "To be interesting and beneficial").

Kodansha Limited owns the Otowa Group, which manages subsidiary companies such as King Records (official name: King Record Co., Ltd.), Kobunsha, and Star Seas Company, and publishes Nikkan Gendai, a daily tabloid. It also has close ties and long-term partnership with Disney and officially sponsors Tokyo Disney Resort.

Kodansha was the largest publisher in Japan. Revenues dropped due to the 2000s recession in Japan and an accompanying downturn in the publishing industry: the company posted a loss in the 2002 financial year for the first time since the end of World War II. (The second-largest publisher, Shogakukan, has done relatively better. In the 2003 financial year, Kodansha had revenues of ¥167 billion compared to ¥150 billion for Shogakukan. Kodansha, at its peak, led Shogakukan by over ¥50 billion in revenue.)

Kodansha sponsors the Kodansha Manga Award which has run since 1977 (and since 1960 under other names).

Kodansha's headquarters in Tokyo once housed Noma Dōjō, a kendo practice-hall established by Seiji Noma in 1925. However, the hall was demolished in November 2007 and replaced with a dōjō in a new building nearby.

The company announced that it was closing its English-language publishing house, Kodansha International, at the end of April 2011. Their American publishing house, Kodansha USA, will remain in operation.

Kodansha USA began issuing new publications under the head administrator of the international branch, Kentaro Tsugumi, starting in September 2012 with a hardcover release of The Spirit of Aikido. Many of Kodansha USA's older titles have been reprinted. According to Daniel Mani of Kodansha USA, Inc., "Though we did stopped [sic] publishing new books for about a year starting from late 2011, we did continue to sell most of our older title throughout that period (so Kodansha USA never actually closed)."

In October 2016, Kodansha acquired publisher Ichijinsha and turned the company into its wholly owned subsidiary.

On November 30, 2022, Kodansha announced an extended partnership with Disney to release anime originals based on its manga exclusively on video streaming service Disney+ starting with the second season of Tokyo Revengers.

On May 24, 2024, Kodansha announced that it acquired publisher Wani Books and turned it into a wholly owned subsidiary.

== K Manga ==
A world map highlighting countries that can access the K Manga service as of June 24, 2025

On March 21, 2023, Kodansha announced a manga distribution service called K Manga which was initially launched exclusively in the United States on May 10, 2023. It started approximately with 400 titles, of which 70 were simultaneous publications of ongoing series. On October 21, 2024, it was announced that the service became available in Canada, Australia, New Zealand, and Singapore; on February 4, 2025, it was announced that the service had expanded to the Philippines, Thailand, Vietnam, Hong Kong, Taiwan, India, Mexico, and Brazil. On June 24, 2025, it was announced that the service had expanded to over 30 countries.

== Subsidiaries ==
- King Records
- Kobunsha
- Kodansha USA
- Star Seas Company
  - Saizensen (web manga platform)
- Ichijinsha
- Wani Books

== Relationships with other organizations ==
The Kodansha company holds ownership in various broadcasting companies in Japan. It also owns shares in Nippon Cultural Broadcasting and Kobunsha. In the 2005 takeover-war for Nippon Broadcasting System between Livedoor and Fuji TV, Kodansha supported Fuji TV by selling its stock to Fuji TV.

=== NHK ===
Kodansha has a somewhat complicated relationship with NHK (Nippon Housou Kyoukai), Japan's public broadcaster. Many of the manga and novels published by Kodansha have spawned anime adaptations. Animation such as Cardcaptor Sakura, aired in NHK's Eisei Anime Gekijō time-slot, and Kodansha published a companion magazine to the NHK children's show Okāsan to Issho. The two companies often clash editorially, however. The October 2000 issue of Gendai accused NHK of staging footage used in a news report in 1997 on dynamite fishing in Indonesia. NHK sued Kodansha in the Tokyo District Court, which ordered Kodansha to publish a retraction and pay ¥4 million in damages. Kodansha appealed the decision and reached a settlement whereby it had to issue only a partial retraction and to pay no damages. Gendai's sister magazine Shūkan Gendai nonetheless published an article probing further into the staged-footage controversy that has dogged NHK.

== Honors ==
- Japan Foundation: Japan Foundation Special Prize, 1994.

== List of magazines ==
=== Manga magazines ===
This is a list of manga magazines published by Kodansha.

==== Male-oriented manga magazines ====
===== Shōnen manga magazines =====
- Weekly Shōnen Magazine (since 1959)
- Monthly Shōnen Magazine (since 1975)
- Shōnen Sirius (monthly, since 2005)
- Bessatsu Shōnen Magazine (monthly, since 2009)
- Suiyōbi no Sirius (website, since 2013)
- Magazine Pocket (app/website, since 2015)
- Monthly Maga Kichi (website, since 2023)

===== Seinen manga magazines =====
- Weekly Young Magazine (since 1980)
- Morning (weekly, since 1982; biweekly from 1982–1986; originally called Comic Morning)
- Afternoon (monthly, since 1986)
- Monthly Young Magazine (since 2009)
- Good! Afternoon (monthly, since 2012; bimonthly from 2008 to 2012)
- Comic Days (app/website, since 2018)
- Yanmaga Web (website, since 2020)
- Morning Two Web (website, since 2022)

==== Female-oriented manga magazines ====
===== Shōjo manga magazines =====
- Nakayoshi (monthly, since 1954)
- Bessatsu Friend (monthly, since 1965)
- Dessert (monthly, since 1996)

===== Josei manga magazines =====
- Be Love (monthly 1980–1982, 2018–present, biweekly 1982–2018; originally called Be in Love)
- Kiss (monthly, since 1992)

=== Web magazines ===
- Ane Friend
- comic tint (2018–2027)
- Honey Milk
- Magazine Pocket
- ARTEMIS by Sirius
- &Sofa

=== Literary magazines ===
- Gunzō, monthly literary magazine
- Mephisto, tri-annual literary magazine focusing on mystery and detective stories
- Faust
- Shūkan Gendai

=== Lifestyle and fashion magazines ===
- Voce (1998–)

=== Discontinued magazines ===
==== Male-oriented manga magazines ====
===== Kodomo (children's) manga magazines =====
- Comic BomBom (1981–2007)

===== Shōnen manga magazines =====
- Shōnen Club (1914–1962)
- Monthly Manga Shōnen (1947–1955)
- Bokura (1954–1969)
- Magazine Special (1983–2017)
- Monthly Shōnen Magazine GREAT (1993–2009)
- Monthly Shōnen Rival (2008–2014)
- Magazine E-no (2009–2011)
- Monthly Shonen Magazine+ (2011–2014)
- Shōnen Magazine R (2015–2023)
- Shōnen Magazine Edge (2015–2023)
- Hot-Dog Press (1979–2004)

===== Seinen manga magazines =====
- Young Magazine Zōkan Kaizokuban (ヤングマガジン増刊海賊版) (1986–1995)
- Afternoon Season Zōkan (1987–1988, 1999–2002)
- Mr. Magazine (1991–2000)
- Young Magazine Uppers (1998–2004)
- Monthly Magazine Z (1999–2009)
- Evening (2001–2023)
- Morning Two (2006–2022)
- Nemesis (2010–2018)
- Young Magazine the 3rd (2014–2021)

==== Female-oriented manga magazines ====
===== Shōjo manga magazines =====
- Shōjo Club (monthly, 1923–1962)
- Shōjo Friend (1962–1996)
- Mimi (1975–1996)
- Monthly Carol (1983–1984)
- Suspense & Horror (1988–1998)
- The Dessert (monthly, 1999–2015)
- Nakayoshi Lovely (5 issues per year, 2003–2011)
- Aria (monthly, 2010–2018)

===== Josei manga magazines =====
- Kiss Plus (bimonthly, 2008–2014; succeeded by Hatsu Kiss)
- ITAN (bimonthly, 2010–2018)
- Hatsu Kiss (bimonthly 2014–2018, monthly 2018–2021)

== Book series ==
=== Published by Kodansha Ltd. ===
- Kodansha Gakujutsu Bunko (講談社学術文庫) (English, "Kodansha Academic Paperback Library") (1970)

=== Published by Kodansha International ===
- Japanese for Busy People Series
- Japanese for Young People Series
- Kodansha Bilingual Books
- Kodansha Globe
- This Beautiful World

== Miss iD ==
Kodansha organized the Miss iD pageants, held annually from 2012 to 2022. iD stood for "identity", "idol", "I", and "diversity", and it had been described as a pageant to discover diverse role models for the "new era" without being bound to conventional beauty and lifestyle standards. Married and transgender women were allowed to participate. The Miss ID title was awarded to more than one person each year, and holders of the title include actress Tina Tamashiro, singer Rie Kaneko, and musician Ena Fujita. Computer-generated character Saya and AI character Rinna were semifinalists in the 2018 pageant.

== Awards given ==
Kodansha presents the following awards:

- The Noma Prize for Literature
- The Noma Literary Prize for New Writers
- The Noma Literary Prize for Children's Literature
- The Noma Publishing Cultural Prize
- The Yoshikawa Eiji Prize for Literature
- The Yoshikawa Eiji Bunko Prize
- The Yoshikawa Eiji Prize for New Writers
- The Yoshikawa Eiji Cultural Prize
- The Kodansha Manga Awards
- The Kodansha Honda Yasuharu Non-Fiction Award
- The Kodansha Science Publication Award
- The Kodansha Picture Book Award
- The Noma Award for the Translation of Japanese Literature
- The Edogawa Rampo Award
- The Kodansha Media Award

== See also ==
- Edwin O. Reischauer Memorial House
- Kodansha Noma Memorial Museum
- Noma Prize
- Tuttle Publishing
- Vertical (publisher)
