= Gekkan bunkazai =

Japanese monthly magazine

- Categories: Cultural Properties of Japan
- Frequency: Monthly
- Publisher: Daiichi Hōki Shuppan
- Founded: 1963
- Country: Japan
- Based in: Tokyo
- Language: Japanese
- Website: http://www.bunka.go.jp/publish/bunkazai/index.html
- ISSN: 0016-5948

Gekkan bunkazai (月刊文化財) (lit. "Cultural Properties Monthly") is a monthly magazine of research on the Cultural Properties of Japan. It is published in Japanese by the Agency for Cultural Affairs.

== See also ==
- National Treasures of Japan
- Hozon Kagaku
