= Tōbaé =

Defunct weekly satirical magazine in Japan (1887–1889)

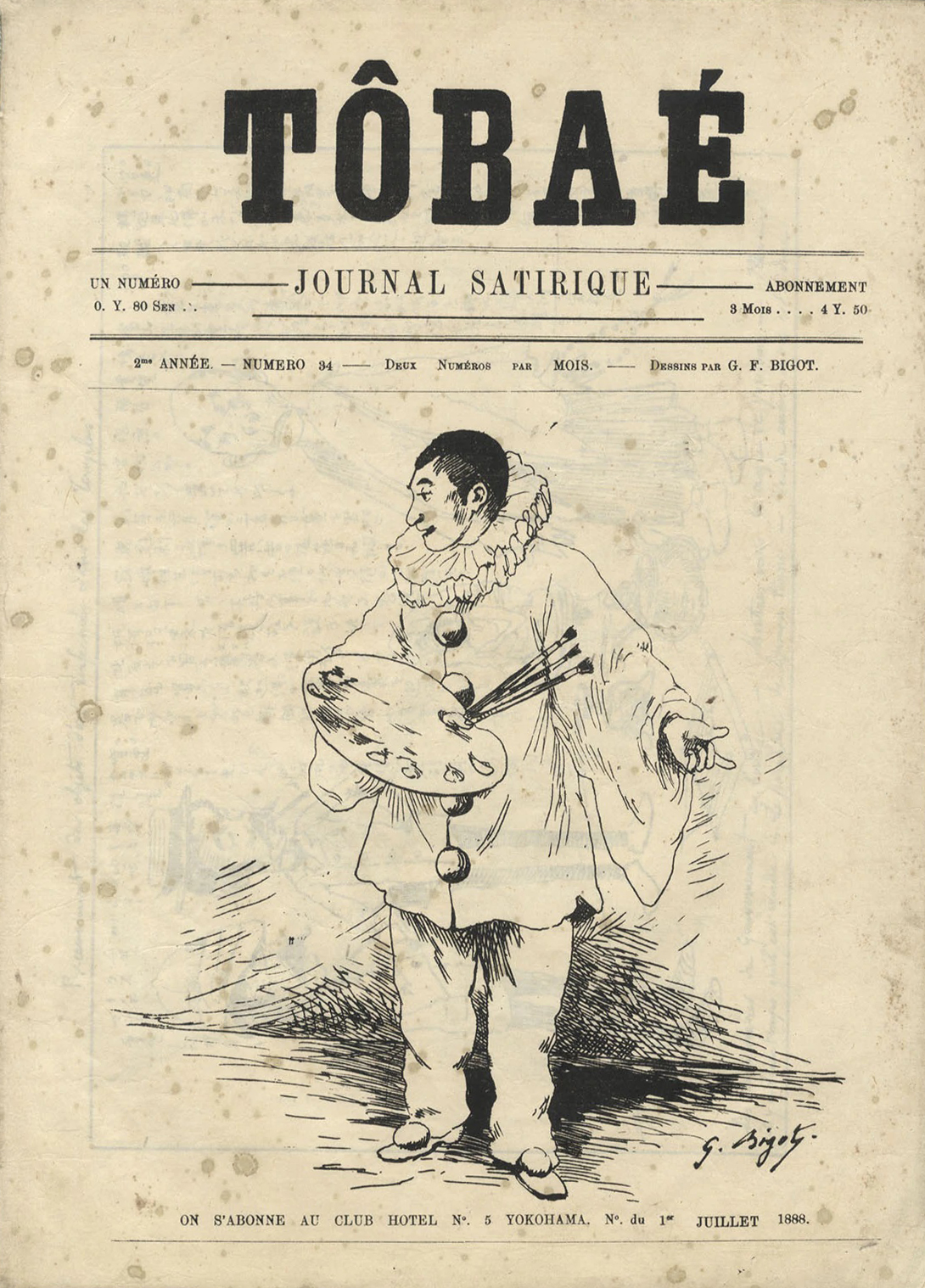
- A cover page of Tōbaé dated 1888
- Categories: Satirical magazine
- Frequency: Weekly
- Founder: Georges Ferdinand Bigot
- Founded: 1887
- Final issue: 1889
- Country: Japan
- Based in: Tokyo
- Language: French; Japanese

Tōbaé (トバエ) was a Japanese and French weekly satirical magazine published in the period 1887–1889.

== History and profile ==
Tōbaé was started by French cartoonist Georges Ferdinand Bigot in 1887 as a weekly satirical magazine. The magazine featured Bigot's cartoons which were mostly dealt with everyday activities of Japanese people and Japanese politicians. The cartoons criticized the negative consequences of the westernization attempts in Japan. Tōbaé folded in 1889.
