= UniJapan Film Quarterly =

Film magazine in Japan (1958–1979)

- Editor-in-chief: Kuroda Toyoji
- Categories: Film trade magazine
- Frequency: Quarterly
- Founder: UniJapan Film, Association for the Diffusion of Japanese Films Abroad
- Founded: 1958
- First issue: July 1958
- Final issue: 1979
- Country: Japan
- Based in: Tokyo
- Language: English
- ISSN: 0041-6754
- OCLC: 977105436

UniJapan Film Quarterly was a free quarterly film trade magazine which was in circulation between 1958 and 1979 in Tokyo, Japan. It was published in English and covered films produced in Japan.

== History and profile ==
UniJapan Film Quarterly was established by UniJapan Film, Association for the Diffusion of Japanese Films Abroad in 1958. Its first issue appeared in July that year. The founding association, UniJapan Film, was founded in 1957 and is a government-backed institution which aims at supporting the film industry in Japan. The Italian film magazine Unitalia Film inspired UniJapan Film Quarterly.

Throughout its life time the directors of UniJapan Film Quarterly were Kawakita Nagamasa and Hori Kyusaku. The magazine's sole editor-in-chief was Kuroda Toyoji. Its editorial board members were all Japanese except for Lewis Bush who served in the board from 1960 to 1968.

The magazine was free of charge. It was based in Tokyo and featured articles about the Japanese films and soap operas. The magazine also covered film reviews which increased the marketing options of the Japanese films since it was published in English making it possible for the magazine to reach larger audience. In addition it was regularly sent to film-related institutions, producers, distributors and exhibitors, and newspapers in different countries. UniJapan Film Quarterly folded in September 1979 and was replaced by another magazine entitled Japanese Film.

Some issues of UniJapan Film Quarterly were kept by bookstores in Paris, France. The National Diet Library has the digital archive of the magazine.
