= Genyoshi Kadokawa =

Japanese businessman

- 角川 源義
- Born: 9 October 1917; Toyama, Toyama Prefecture Japan
- Died: 27 October 1975 (aged 58); Shinjuku, Tokyo, Japan
- Education: Kokugakuin University
- Occupations: Author, business magnate
- Years active: 1945–1975
- Era: Shōwa era
- Organization: Kadokawa Shoten
- Successor: Haruki Kadokawa
- Political party: Japan Socialist Party
- Spouse: Fumiko Suzuki
- Children: Jun Henmi; Haruki Kadokawa; Tsuguhiko Kadokawa

Genyoshi Kadokawa (Japanese: 角川 源義, 9 October 1917 – 27 October 1975) was a Japanese businessman who was the founder of Kadokawa Shoten. Several academic prizes have been named in his honor.
