= Famicom Hisshoubon =

Japanese video game magazine

- Cover of the first issue of Famicom Hisshoubon
- Editor: Hisakazu Hirabayashi
- Categories: Video game
- First issue: March 8, 1986; 40 years ago
- Final issue: 1990; 36 years ago
- Company: JICC Publishing Bureau
- Based in: Japan
- Language: Japanese

Famicom Hisshoubon (Japanese: ファミコン必勝本; lit. 'The Famicom Winning Guide') is a Japanese video game magazine. It was among the four major Japanese magazines that were released in the wake of the popularity boom of Family Computer (Famicom), which started in 1985. It was one of the three magazines that were first published in 1986 following the debut of Tokuma Shoten's Family Computer Magazine in 1985.

The magazine initially just published strategy guides for Famicom games, but later expanded to having other writers, including Daisuke Narusawa and Satoshi Tajiri, who would go on to create the popular Pokémon franchise. The magazine was published until 1990, and then rebranded as Hippon Super! which focused on video game consoles beyond the Famicom. By 1995, it refocused to write specifically about the Nintendo 64 and went through other name changes before its final issue in 1998.

== Publication history ==
Between 1985 and 1987, there was a boom in popularity for the Family Computer in Japan. This was due to the release of the high-selling game Super Mario Bros. (1985) as well as a large number of companies that got involved in developing games to sell for the Famicom. While there were more general video game magazines in Japan before 1985, such as Mycom BASIC and Login, the first magazine dedicated to a Nintendo console was Tokuma Shoten's Family Computer Magazine in July 1985. It became the first magazine dedicated to the Famicom.

The sales for Family Computer Magazine increased, with the magazine selling over 430,000 copies for its January 1986 issue. Famicom Hisshoubon would be the first of three magazines dedicated to the Family Computer released in 1986. Its first issue was published on March 8, 1986, by JICC Publishing Bureau. Along with ASCII Corporation's Famicom Tsushin (now known as Famitsu) and Kadokawa Shoten's Marukatsu Famicom, which were published later in 1986, these were the four major magazines covering the Famicom at its boom period.

Hisakazu Hirabayashi was an editor of Famicom Hisshoubon who was involved with the magazine since its inception. Hirabayashi had played games since his childhood and initially went to school to work in advertising. He applied for a job in 1985 at JICC Publishing and started working on launching Famicom Hisshoubon. Hirabayashi said at the time he initially did not want to work in the video game industry as his classmates got jobs at other major media companies. As he learned about the industry, he grew more interested in it.

The predecessors to the magazine was called Family Computer Hisshoubon that was published as part of the Bessatsu Takarajima series of mooks. Hirabayashi found that the magazine required more writers. The first hire was Masayuki Ikeda, a manga editor and game writer who also wrote under the name Akira Hibiki. Through Ikeda, he also hired other writers who wrote for Mycom BASIC such as Akira Yamashita and Ichiro Tezuka. Other staff included game critic Daisuke Narusawa who approached Hirabayashi directly to write for them. Another writer was Satoshi Tajiri, who initially wrote the fanzine Game Freak. Famicom Hisshoubon was published twice a month. It ended as a publication in 1990 and then was rebranded as Hippon Super!.

== Content ==
Famicom Hisshoubon staff member Benny Matsuyama was a fan of Wizardry: Proving Grounds of the Mad Overlord (1981) and dedicated himself to spreading the word about the game series. He published a novel titled Wizardry Novel: Tonariawase no Hai to Seishun (Note: 小説ウィザードリィ 隣り合わせの灰と青春; lit. The Wizardry Novel: Ashes and Youth Side by Side) which first appeared in Famicom Hisshoubon starting in 1988.

== Reception ==
A writer for the Institute of Game Culture Conservation wrote in 2019 that Famicom Hisshoubon would have articles for "hardcore fans" of video games, and while other magazines grew to be like press release magazines, Famicom Hisshoubon had a more journalistic approach that helped convey the deeper aspects of the video game industry.

Hirabayashi said that Famicom Hisshoubon lacked the number of staff of Family Computer Magazine, the latter magazine, as its publisher Tokuma Shoten was superior in terms of sales power. He also found that in terms of editorial expertise, they were inferior to Famicom Tsushin. While describing the magazine as being niche, he felt it was a good area to nurture writers like Narusawa, Tajiri, Ichiro Tezuka, and Benny Matsuyama.

== Legacy ==
Following the end of publication for Famicom Hisshoubon, the magazine was rebranded to Hippon Super!. Editor Hisakazu Hirabayashi went independent at this point of re-branding. Famicom Hisshoubon writer Satoshi Tajiri would later have his fanzine Game Freak became the company that created the popular Pokémon franchise.

Hippon Super!, sometimes referred to as just Hippon, wrote about various video game consoles beyond Nintendo games. By 1995, the magazine was rebranded again and began specifically writing content only about the Nintendo 64. It ceased publication on its combined May 1st and May 15th issue in 1998. In his overview of Japanese game magazines, Kevin Gifford of GameSetWatch said that Hippon Super! wrote "some of the most opinionated and harsh reviews" ever seen in mass-market game print.

== See also ==
- List of magazines in Japan
- List of video game magazines
