= The Television =

Japanese entertainment magazine

- Cover of the November 2025 issue of Monthly The Television featuring Hiroshi Tanahashi
- Native name: ザテレビジョン
- Categories: Entertainment
- Frequency: Monthly; Weekly (until 2023)
- Circulation: 240,342 (2022)
- Publisher: Kadokawa Shoten (1982–2006); Kadokawa The Television (2006–2009); Kadokawa Magazines (2009–present)
- First issue: September 1982; 44 years ago
- Country: Japan
- Language: Japanese
- Website: thetv.jp

The Television (Japanese: ザテレビジョン, Hepburn: Zaterebijon) is a Japanese entertainment magazine published by Kadokawa. It was first published as Weekly The Television (週刊ザテレビジョン, Shūkan Zaterebijon) in 1982 and was published until 2023, when it was merged with Monthly The Television (月刊 ザテレビジョン, Gekkan Zaterebijon).

== History ==
Tsuguhiko Kadokawa of Kadokawa has said he wanted to create a television-themed magazine since the early 1970s. During a visit to the United States in 1970, he was impressed by the American magazine TV Guide, but on bringing up the idea for the magazine with his associates at Kadokawa, they thought it would be impossible to make it into a successful magazine. The magazine was first published in September 1982 by Kadokawa as Weekly The Television under Kadokawa Shoten. It became Kadokawa's first weekly magazine.

In March 1995, Monthly TV Cosmos was relaunched as Monthly The Magazine. The magazine includes information about terrestrial television.

Weekly The Television ceased publication on March 1, 2023. The magazine was later merged with Monthly The Television on March 23. Kadokawa cited its plan to leverage the strengths of both the magazine and web media.

== Contents ==
The magazine featured information and schedules on television programs, and is also known for its cover featuring celebrities holding lemons. Notable covers include: the November 6, 1987, issue featuring Michael Jackson, the March 4, 2015, issue featuring One Direction—the first foreign artist to be on the cover alone, and covers featuring Sexy Zone and Snow Man.

The magazine runs the website Web The Television and other special magazines such as The Television Zoom!!, The Television Colors and The Television-genic. In September 2012, it launched The Television Digital, a mobile app that published digitalized version of the magazine.

According to the Japan Magazine Publishers Association, Weekly The Television has an average of 128,124 copies in circulation, while Monthly The Television had 240,342 copies between October and December 2022. The Monthly The Television is one of the largest television magazines in Japan in terms of circulation.

== The Television Drama Academy Awards ==
The Television Drama Academy Awards
- Native name: ザテレビジョンドラマアカデミー賞
- Awarded for: To "honor television drama series that have generated a significant social response"
- Sponsored by: The Television
- Country: Japan
- First award: 1994; 32 years ago
- Website: thetv.jp/feature/drama-academy

The magazine also holds The Television Drama Academy Awards (ザテレビジョンドラマアカデミー賞, Zaterebijon Dorama Akademī-shō). It was established in 1994. It aims to "honor television drama series that have generated a significant social response". The winners are determined through votes cast by readers of the magazine, a panel of judges, and television journalists. The award categories include: Best Drama, Best Actor, Best Actress, Best Supporting Actor, Best Supporting Actress, Best Drama Song, Best Director, Best Screenplay, and The Television Award.
