= Login (Japanese magazine) =

Japanese video game magazine

- Cover of the first issue of Login
- Categories: Video game
- Frequency: Monthly, weekly
- First issue: April 1983; 43 years ago
- Final issue: May 24, 2008; 18 years ago
- Company: ASCII (1983–2000); Enterbrain (2000–2008)
- Based in: Japan
- Language: Japanese

Login (Japanese: ログイン, Hepburn: Roguin) (stylized as LOGiN) is a video game magazine with a focus on personal computer (PC) games. It was one of many video game magazines that emerged in the early 1980s and began as a small section of Monthly ASCII in 1982. It became its own monthly print magazine in April 1983. In 1988, Login became the first PC game magazine in Japan to be published biweekly.

Among the content of the magazine were Login, sales charts, reviews, interviews and development news on various computer games. It also had a section dedicated to console games, which would become its own magazine Famicom Tsushin, now known as Famitsu. From 1984 to 1997, the magazine had often silly and humorous content to it that was occasionally not related to video games or computer software. It dropped most of its more humorous content by 1997 and in 1998 began publishing monthly again.

The magazine also published software, releasing two games under its "Login Software" brand. The company also published software for game development, with the most famous being RPGMaker. The magazine ended its print run in 2008.

== Publication history ==
By the mid-1980s, there was a demand from the video game market for game strategies, which led to numerous video game magazines to be launched. Computer magazines launched in the 1980s initially featured articles with topics more closely related to science magazines, with illustrations of circuit diagrams and explanations of electronic projects. As more software for home computers became available, the video game magazine format solidified.

Login started as a separate volume of the personal computer (PC) magazine Monthly ASCII in 1982 by the ASCII Corporation with Login focusing more on games and entertainment. It became an independent PC magazine with the release of its April 1983 issue. Fumitaka Kojima became the magazine's editor in chief on September 1984.

In 1988, Login became published bi-weekly, becoming the first PC game magazine in Japan to do so. Kevin Gifford of Game Set Watch said that by 1992, Login had gone beyond PC gaming content to various "fantasy/sci-fi/geek content". By 1997 Gifford described it as a more "orthodox PC game magazine", and returned to being a monthly publication in 1998. In 2000 the magazine was bought and published by Enterbrain. Enterbrain announced that Login would cease publication of its print magazine with its final issue being published on May 24, 2008 and would continue as a web magazine. The web-based content ended after approximately two years.

=== Game and software development ===
The Login editorial team would spearhead the production of adventure games such as Hokkaido Rensa Satsujin: Ohotsuku ni Kiyu (1984), which was written by freelance writer Yuji Horii. Horii would later become famous for creating the Dragon Quest series. Ohotsuku ni Kiyu was one of the only two games produced under the "Login Software" brand, with the other being Eiyū Yamato Takeru (1985). Horri would later work with other Login editors games such as Itadaki Street (1991).

Login called for game program submissions and would hire some these amateur creators as staff for the ASCII Corporation's game production division. Among these hired staff, would include Hiroyuki Sonobe who would go on to create the Derby Stallion and the Best Play Pro Baseball game series.

Login published software for game development. This included Adventure Tool in 1983, a utility for creating text adventure video games. In 1987, the magazine introduced Adventure Tsukūru, the first software to bear the Tsukūru brandname. Login published and sold the program on floppy disks through mail order. Login also hosted contests for games made with the Tsukūru series and sold some of the best entries.

== Content ==
Login published interviews with both Japanese and overseas game designers such as Robert Woodhead who developed Wizardry or Douglas E. Smith who created Lode Runner (1983).

After Tokuma Shoten released Technopolis as PC game magazine, they launched Family Computer Magazine, commonly referred to as Famimaga in July 1985 which became a successful magazine. This led to ASCII Corporation to launch Famicom Tsushin (now known as Famitsu) as a separate issue of Login. Famicom Tsushin was initially a section of Login that debuted in the March 1985 issue and its own unique publication in June 1986.

Kevin Gifford of GameSetWatch said that from September 1984 to 1997, the magazine often had a silly humorous quality to it and would often publish humor articles that had little to do with video games or computers. One of these sections was the Yamalog (ヤマログ) section.

== Reception ==
In Japanese Game Studies: A Guide to Studying Japanese Games academic Akito Inoue said writing from authors like Hitoshi Yasuda, Akira Yamashita, and Yutaka Tama in serializations in magazines like ASCII, Login, and Mycom BASIC are considered as "valuable critical texts of that era."

TheTsukūru software series that Login published included its most popular software with RPG Maker, which allows its users to create Dragon Quest-styled role-playing video games. Academic Nobushige Kobayashi The Tsukūru series "significantly lowered the barrier to game creation" and contributed to the development of Japan's game production culture.

== See also ==
- List of magazines in Japan
- List of video game magazines
