= Haruki Kadokawa =

Japanese entrepreneur and filmmaker (born 1942)

- 角川 春樹
- Pronunciation: Kadokawa Haruki
- Born: January 8, 1942 (age 84); Mizuhashi, Toyama, Japan
- Education: Kokugakuin University
- Occupations: Businessman; film producer; film director
- Spouse: Tomomi Yamada (m. 2011)
- Father: Genyoshi Kadokawa

Haruki Kadokawa (角川 春樹, Kadokawa Haruki; born January 8, 1942, in Tokyo) is a Japanese entrepreneur and filmmaker. He is the son of Genyoshi Kadokawa, the founder of the publishing company Kadokawa Shoten. He took over as president of the company in 1975 after his father's death. He entered the film industry as a producer and introduced a technique called media mix, which involved mass promotion and talent scouting for new artists in publishing, film, and television. In 1993, he was arrested for drug smuggling. He resigned as president of Kadokawa Shoten, founding Kadokawa Haruki Corporation instead.

== Early life ==
Haruki's father was Genyoshi Kadokawa, the founder of Japanese publishing house Kadokawa Shoten. After graduating from high school, Haruki was accepted into the literature department of Waseda University. However, with his father's influence, he was enrolled in Kokugakuin University instead. Haruki graduated in 1964 with a degree in literature and joined his father's company the next year.

== Career with Kadokawa Shoten ==
Upon Genyoshi's death in 1975, Haruki took over as the company's president. He quickly turned the publisher's direction, changing the company that had previously been known for its serious literary and educational works into creators of popular fiction.

Kadokawa soon also branched out into the film business. His goal was to try to reap synergy benefits by creating film adaptations of the publishing house's most popular books and marketing them simultaneously. The company's first film was the 1976 release The Inugamis, directed by Kon Ichikawa and adopted from a Kadokawa Shoten published novel written by Seishi Yokomizo. Due to an aggressive marketing campaign, the film ended as the second-largest earner of the year in Japan.

Between 1976 and 1993, Kadokawa produced close to 60 films. His company's pictures were usually large-scale epics with sizable budgets and matching advertising campaigns, aimed for mass audiences and box-office success. While critics weren't always kind on Kadokawa's works, the films were consistently popular among the viewing public. By 1992, 7 out of top 20 all-time highest box-office grossing Japanese films were Kadokawa's productions. During his time at Kadokawa Shoten, Haruki was often hailed as the savior of Japan's struggling film industry. Kadokawa's efforts to branch into foreign markets were consistently less successful. His biggest failure came in 1992 when the 25 million US$ film Ruby Cairo starring Andie MacDowell failed to find a distributor in the United States.

Kadokawa also worked as a screenwriter and a director. He made his directorial debut in 1982 with the film The Last Hero. His most notable work was the 1990 film Heaven and Earth, whose budget of over 5 billion yen was the largest ever for a Japanese film at the time.

== Arrest ==
In 1993, Kadokawa was accused of instructing photographer Takeshi Ikeda, a close aide, to smuggle cocaine from the United States on several occasions. He was charged with smuggling and embezzling money from his company in order to fund the drug purchases. While Kadokawa continued to argue his innocence throughout the ordeal, in September 1994 he was convicted and handed a four-year prison sentence, of which he ended up serving two and a half years.

Due to the "moral embarrassment" regarding the incident, the film Rex: A Dinosaur's Story, a 1993 summer blockbuster directed by Kadokawa, was pulled from theaters by Kadokawa's production company and its distribution partner, Shochiku Company. Kadokawa himself was forced to resign from Kadokawa Shoten. The new president was Haruki's younger brother Tsuguhiko, who had previously been forced out of the company in favor of Haruki's son Taro.

== Later career ==
In 1995, Kadokawa started the Kadokawa Haruki Corporation and continued in the publishing business by purchasing the teen magazine Popteen from his old company Kadokawa Shoten. In 2005, after more than a decade away from the business, Kadokawa returned to producing films with the World War II epic Yamato. In 1997, he directed Toki o Kakeru Shōjo. He has since worked as an executive producer on Genghis Khan: To the Ends of the Earth and Sea and a remake of Akira Kurosawa's Sanjuro in 2007.

== Other ventures ==
Throughout his career Kadokawa has earned a reputation for flamboyancy, not all of which stems from his large scale films and their advertising campaigns. In 1974, he built his own Shinto shrine and conducted monthly rituals there. He wrote critically praised haiku and tanka poetry that was published in poetry magazines, a hobby he continued while incarcerated. In 1991, Kadokawa finished building a full-size replica of Christopher Columbus' flagship Santa Maria, which sailed from Barcelona to Japan, with Kadokawa initially at the helm.

== Partial filmography ==
Year	Film	Producer	Director	Notes	Ref(s)
1976	The Inugami Family	Yes			
1977	Proof of the Man	Yes			
1978	Never Give Up	Yes			
1979	G.I. Samurai	Co-producer		Co-produced with Takeshi Motomura	
1980	Virus	Yes			
1980	The Beast to Die	Yes			
1981	Sailor Suit and Machine Gun	Executive			
1982	The Last Hero	Co-producer	Yes		
1983	Detective Story	Executive			
1984	Curtain Call		Yes		
1986	Cabaret		Yes		
1990	Heaven and Earth		Yes	Also co-writer	
1991	Noh Mask Murders	Executive			
1992	Ruby Cairo	Executive		Also known as Deception	
1993	Rex: A Dinosaur's Story		Yes	Also co-writer	
1997	Toki o Kakeru Shōjo		Yes	Also co-writer	
2009	The Laughing Policeman	Executive	Yes	Also writer	
2020	Mio's Cookbook		Yes	Also co-writer	
