= List of Shy characters =

The Shy manga and anime series features various characters created by Bukimi Miki. The series takes place in a fictional world where each country on Earth has its own superhero who is responsible for keeping peace in their respective homeland, while working together with the other heroes of the world to ward off the threat of the supervillain group, Amarariruku.

== Heroes ==
Some of the main characters from Shy. From left to right: Davie W. "Stardust" John, Pepesha "Spirit" Andreanova, Teru "Shy" Momijiyama, Piltz "Lady Black" Dunant, and Ming Ming "Mian Long" Li

Teru Momijiyama (紅葉山 輝, Momijiyama Teru) / Shy (シャイ, Shai)
Voiced by: Shino Shimoji (Japanese); Veronica Laux (English)
Country: Japan
Teru is the main protagonist of the story. After her sister's passing, she inherited her Heart-Shift Bracelets and became Japan's hero while still attending middle school. As her hero name implies, she is very shy to a near crippling degree. She is a compassionate and pure-hearted girl who exudes more of her power when she is helping others. On the other hand, she is also easily held back by her low self-esteem and her own feelings of helplessness. Despite this, she works tirelessly as her country's representative. As the hero Shy, she wears a white bodysuit with exposed thighs with a white eye visor, twin-tailed hood, and gas mask. Teru usually wears glasses while in civilian form, but not as a hero. Also, as her hair is normally brown, it turns white when she transforms into Shy. She quickly becomes skilled in close combat and is able to withstand tremendous amounts of pain. She has the ability to turn the Heart Power from her Heart-Shift Bracelets into flames, which she can unleash a powerful heat wave, dubbed the "One Stroke". She also has an exhaust vent on her back which she uses her flames to ascend to tall heights and land safely.
Pepesha Andreanova (ペペシャ・アンドレアノワ, Pepesha Andoreanowa) / Spirit (スピリッツ, Supirittsu)
Voiced by: Mamiko Noto (Japanese); Natalie Rose (English)
Country: Russia
Pepesha is Teru's best friend and mentor who is very close with her. In the beginning of the story, she gives advice that helps Teru regain her hero confidence after being shut-in for months due to the backlash she received from a roller coaster accident. Pepesha lost her mother at a very young age, and like her, grew up as an orphan. It was the desire to share the love her mother bestowed upon her that motivated her to become a hero. They were both raised in Yuri Orphanage, a local orphanage. A habit that she picked up from her mother is her love of drinking excessive amounts of vodka. She is always seen drunk, with flushed cheeks and a relaxed expression. However, regardless of being a heavy drinker, she is still seen by others as a very dependable person who is not afraid to speak her mind when necessary. As the hero Spirit, she wears a black bodysuit under a turtlenecked blue shirt and massive white jacket, and has a utility belt at her waist. Her Heart-Shift Bracelets allow her to manipulate gasses and turn her own body into smoke. She can also release a mass of super-compressed air from her palm, a move she dubs the "Airy Blast". She naturally has the ability to fly. Her first name is derived from the World War II-era PPSh-41 submachine gun.
Davie W. John (ディヴィー=W(ワンダー)=ジョン, Divī Wandā Jon) / Stardust (スターダスト, Sutādasuto)
Voiced by: Shin-ichiro Miki, Asuna Tomari (young) (Japanese); Aaron Campbell, Terri Doty (young) (English)
Country: United Kingdom
In addition to being a rock star and philanthropist, Davie is the founder of Black Cross, an international aid organization. Even though he comes across as charitable, he is known by his hero peers as a heartless and apathetic person who has been known to use drastic and unethical means while going about his heroism. He has an inborn lack of empathy, which he struggled with from an early age, but continued to seek what he lacked and became one of the world's top heroes. He is responsible for helping to unlock Shy's Heart Power after he was requested to fight against her when the two first met at Space HQ. As the hero Stardust, he wears a full black bodysuit with a star in the middle, he has slicked back blonde hair, and he wears a pair of red-framed glasses. With his Heart-Shift Bracelets, he has the ability to control the flow of whatever is around him, which he can use to redirect incoming attacks. He is exceptionally skilled in hand-to-hand combat. He has a accelerated high kick, dubbed the "Ashes to Stardust". His character is modeled after rock star David Bowie.
Piltz Dunant (ピルツ・デュナン, Pirutsu Dyunan) / Lady Black (レディ・ブラック, Redi Burakku)
Voiced by: Sayumi Suzushiro (Japanese); Jill Harris (English)
Country: Switzerland
Piltz is a fellow member of Black Cross and a nursing student, who utilizes healing powers. She uses prosthetic legs due to losing both of them in a past accident. She also possesses incredible stamina from growing up and training in the mountains. Although she tends to have a bit of a sharp tongue and a bad temper, she cares about those that she helps. She is very stern with Teru in order to help spurn her on to being a better hero. As the hero Lady Black, she wears a black dress with a white sleeveless buttoned top with black framed-shades and a small frilly black tie. She wears her hair in twin tails, which is normally short as a civilian, but grows longer after she transforms into her hero form. She can produce long black bandages, syringes, and twin pistols, which she uses to fight. Her last name comes from Red Cross co-founder Henry Dunant.
Ming Ming Li (李=明明(リー=ミンミン), Rī Minmin) / Mian Long (ミェンロン, Myenron)
Voiced by: Ayumu Murase (Japanese); Emi Lo (English)
Country: China
Ming Ming is a slender teenage boy with an androgynous appearance. Because of his look, most people sometimes confuse him for a girl, as Teru did when she first met him. While he may be efficient at fighting, he is insecure about not looking as intimidating as other men. He aspires to get stronger, but also wishes he could save those in need without having to fight. He and Teru connect greatly due to their low self-esteem and nervousness, and it is implied he harbors feelings for her. As the hero Mian Long, he wears a white and black traditional Chinese chiffon-style top. He is skilled in kenpō, a martial art passed down in his family. His Heart-Shift Bracelets have the ability to brandish claws from his own Heart Power to put his enemies to sleep for a short while, which he calls his "Slumbering Claws". He also finds himself falling asleep at odd times. In Chinese, his hero name translates to "mighty dragon".
Adam Rockwell (アダム=ロックウェル, Adamu Rokkuweru) / Leader Century (リーダー・センチュリー, Rīdā Senchurī)
Voiced by: Wataru Hatano (Japanese); T.J. Anthony (English)
Country: United States
Adam is a hero as well as an active military colonel. He is currently enlisted in the United States Marine Corps. He has a serious personality and a high sense of pride as a hero. He has a muscular build, is always training or working out, and is someone who seems to be sensitive about his health. He loves children and has a young daughter that he loves highly affectionately. As the hero Leader Century, he wears a white and red bodysuit with horns on his mask. With his Heart-Shift Bracelets, he has the ability to manipulate gravity. Like Spirit, he can fly. His first name comes from comic book artist Adam Hughes and his surname is taken from painter Norman Rockwell.
Gelm Stein (ゲルム=シュタイン, Gerumu Shutain) / Doctor Schwartz (ドクター・シュヴァルツ, Dokutā Shuvarutsu)
Voiced by: Naomi Kusumi
Country: Germany
Gelm is the director of the medical department of Black Cross. He works alongside Lady Black. He is a mature, experienced man with a gentle and easygoing personality who is the opposite to Plitz's steadfast and stern demeanor. As the hero Doctor Schwartz, he wears a cape with a gas mask tied around his neck over a white shirt, cargo pants, boots, and gloves. He also sports a belt with a pouch on the left side. In German, his hero name can translate to "Doctor Black", which is similar to his partner Piltz's name of Lady Black.
L'Arc Materia Renoir (ラールク=マテリア=ルノアール, Rāruku Materia Runoāru) / La Voile (ラヴォワール, Ravowāru)
Country: France
L'Arc is a skilled up-and-coming artist hero who has been making a name for themselves through social media, which has nicknamed him "The Artist of Space". They enjoy playing pranks on people. As the hero La Voile, they wear a white, padded jacket and have white hair with a red streak in the front, and carry art tools. With their "Fakeup" ability, they can change a person or object's appearance using their art. L'Arc is androgynous and the series does not specify their sex or gender; their character file states that their response to being asked about their gender is "whichever you like more" (君の好きなほうで, Kimi no Suki na Hō de).^{Vol. 10 extras} Their last name comes from French Impressionist artist Pierre-Auguste Renoir.
Ananda Varma (アナンダ=ヴァルマ, Ananda Varuma) / Nirvana (ニルヴァーナ, Niruvāna)
Country: India
Ananda is a member of a misfit group of superheroes known as the Shining Six, that were formed by Teru's late sister, whom he was madly in love with while she was still alive. The Shining Six carry on after her death, as she originally helped to bring the group together. He has a well-developed, muscular physique and is considered to be one of the strongest heroes in the world. Personality-wise, he is incredibly tone-deaf, something he doesn't realize himself. As the hero Nirvana, he wears white pants and a white top with the arms exposed. He can use his "Disappearance" ability to reduce certain things to zero, such as the distance between objects and the power of some abilities.
Seva Wang-Chai (セーヴァ=ワングチャイ, Sēva Wanguchai) / Indra (インドラ, Indora)
Country: Thailand
Seva is a member of the Shining Six. He is a skilled martial artist. As the hero Indra, he fights barefoot and bare-chested, with spiky hair, a horned visor, and lightning bolt patterns visible on the shoulders and legs of his hero costume. He also wears tape on his forearms and calves. He fights with a stick art that is covered with electric shocks. His hero name is taken from Indra, the Hindu god of weather.
Rosalia Peacock (ロザリア=ピーコック, Rozaria Pīkokku) / Pavoreal (パーヴォリア, Pāvoria)
Country: Spain
Rosalia is a member of the Shining Six. She is Spain's best assassin who is married to fellow Shining Six member Omega Rodriguez. She can be seen as overly sexual, as she uses her looks to get close to her assassination targets.
Nyerko Armstrong (ニェルコ=アームストロング, Nyeruko Āmusutorongu) / Rampage (ランペィジ, Ranpeiji)
Country: Greece
Nyerko is a member of the Shining Six. She is fickle like a cat, speaks with a cat-like "nya" at the end of her words, and hates to be disturbed. She is very stubborn and retaliatory, and is quick to use violence to solve problems . As the hero Rampage, she wears a black tank top under a leather jacket and fingerless gloves, as well as cat ears and a tail. She uses cat-like gestures to deliver powerful blows. With her "Death Metal Fist", she has the ability to manipulate and wear metal around her. She can also take any metal around her and use it for a powerful strike, an ability named the "Super Cat Hammer".
Omega Rodriguez (オメガ=ロドリゲズ, Omega Rodorigezu) / Juggernaut (ジャガナート, Jaganāto)
Country: Mexico
Omega is a member of the Shining Six. He has a big, burly, wrestler-type build with a scar across his chest as well as his right eye. Despite his imposing presence, he is known as a kind, gentle, and easygoing person. Formerly a guard for mafia officials, he was at odds with Rosalia's organization, but they later became husband and wife. As the hero Juggernaut, he wears a yellow wrestling outfit with a lucha mask.
Weibu Wang (ウェイブ=ワン, Ueibu Wan) / Pulse (パルス, Parusu)
Country: Singapore
Weibu is a member of the Shining Six. He is skilled at using technology and enjoys tinkering with machines. With his high level of intelligence, he can hack devices, create gadgets, and build robots. He normally has a withdrawn demeanor, but he is not good with girls and gets flustered when they approach him. As the hero Pulse, he sports headphones, cuffed gloves, boots, knee pads, and a tactical vest. He uses special tools to assist him in battle, such as drones with guns and electric riot control wires. He also has a special "Fatal Wave" move that allows him to manipulate electric fields to control various electronic devices or to be used as a stun gun when his wires are affixed to a human body.
Roman Abdulmajid (ロマン=アブドウルマジド, Roman Abudourumajido) / Anima (アニマ)
Country: Nigeria
Roman is the current hero of Nigeria who was first seen in the story during Piltz's goodwill trip to the country on behalf of Black Cross.
Kanon Ahonen (カノン=アホネン) / Haltia (ハルティア, Harutia)
Country: Finland
Kanon is a girl who is always happy, even going so far to nickname herself "Happy-chan". She loves flowers and works at a flower shop. She is deathly afraid of insects and struggles every day to remove them from the flowers. She dreams to make flowers of happiness bloom all over the world. Much like Mian Long, she wants to be a hero that can save people without having to resort to fighting. As the hero Haltia, she wears a sleeveless royal blue dress with golden accents and a white collar with sky blue flaps. The right side of her hair is adorned with a bright blue flower and two red beads. She uses her "Gardening" Heart Power to produce flowers to decorate the hearts of those she encounters. When forced to fight, she uses her "Red Hand" ability that turns her hands red, make her more hostile, and can make weapons stronger. Like Teru, she wears glasses as a civilian, but not as a hero.
Unilord (天帝(ユニロード), Yuni-Rōdo) / Eunnie (ユニっち, Yunicchi)
Voiced by: Kikuko Inoue (Japanese); Molly Searcy (English)
Unilord is a celestial emperor who is the leader of the world's heroes. She lives at Space HQ and monitors the world's heroes' activities back on Earth. She is not a hero, but she has strong authority and gives orders to the heroes as a supervisor. Although she exudes an air of nobility, she is soft-spoken and sometimes tells jokes. She wears a full face mask due to having been severely burned.

== Amarariruku ==
Stigma (far right) with some of the members of his group, Amarariruku.

Stigma (スティグマ, Sutiguma) / Mei Momijiyama (紅葉山 明, Momijiyama Mei) / Shine (シャイン, Shain)
Voiced by: Mutsumi Tamura (Stigma), TBA (Mei) (Japanese); Marisa Duran (Stigma), Katie Wetch (Mei) (English)
Stigma is the leader of Amarariruku. The name "Stigma" is what Unilord and other heroes call him, which he later accepts and uses it for himself. He is extremely abstract and childish, even refusing to mature. He wishes to create an adult-free world, one fit only for children. To do this, he formed Amarariruku by gathering individuals, taking their hearts, turning their wishes and desires into reality, and bestowing a name to all his creations. He uses rings which were made from parts of his heart, which are known as Made in Heart. The rings have powers similar to the Heart-Shift Bracelets. He can also attack his opponents using dark power crystals.
It is revealed later in the story by Iko that Stigma's existence may be the cause from the darkness in the heart of Teru's late sister, Mei Momijiyama, the former hero of Japan, who used the hero name "Shine". The ties between Mei and Amarariruku are that they were all people Mei met in her travels that she was unable to save and ultimately passed on. Mei herself gave her life protecting a group of children in a car accident and Teru's desire to see her again led her to becoming a superhero. The members' names and the group's name itself come from each person's personalities and Mei's unique way of using abbreviations; the name "Amarariruku" itself is a shortened form of the phrase Ame kara Hanareta Sora (雨から離れた空, "The Sky Away from the Rain"), (Note: Shortened to 雨ら離る空(アマラリルク)) a name given to an umbrella used as a good luck charm by Mei and Teru.
Doki Baragaki (ドキ=バラガキ)
Voiced by: Shun'ichi Toki (Japanese); Derick Snow (English)
A feminine-looking member who likes to be thought of as "cute" and has an affinity for cute things, specifically stuffed animals. He tends to be air-headed and simple-minded, yet has an aggressive personality, and will explode in rage when his gender is assumed, as he is often mistaken for a girl. He joined Amarariruku because of his past life experience of being forced to act the way others wanted him to and having his desired form rejected by the world, as believes that men can and should also be pretty. He has an extremely violent and destructive temper, and his horns and claws grow to enormous sizes when his emotions get the best of him. He is clad with a ragged cloak with a tail like a dragon.
Kufufu Kekerakera (Note: Known as "Keheheh Kekerakera" in Yen Press's translated manga.) (クフフ=ケケラケラ)
Voiced by: Rina Hidaka (Japanese); Brittney Karbowski (English)
A boisterous and playful member with a signature laugh, where she gets her name from. She refers to herself in third person and likes to play games and jokes with the heroes. Dressed in a clownish costume, she smiles and laughs because she believes she is at peace as long as she does so. She also believes no matter how a person may be feeling, laughter will lead to peace; she was created and desires to fill the world with laughter and smiles because of this philosophy. She wears her long, green hair in pigtails and wears extremely long sleeves underneath a black shawl. She has the ability to attract things to her and store large and small objects in her costume. She later defects to the heroes' side.
Tzveta Kooriskaya (ツィベタ=コオリスカヤ, Tsibeta Kooriskaya) / Letana Andreanova (レターナ=アンドレアノワ, Retāna Andoreanowa)
Voiced by: Miyuki Sawashiro (Japanese); Julie Shields (English)
A member whose ultimate goal is to create a world where children can life a happy life. She is cold-hearted, ruthless, and emotionless, and has the power to manipulate ice. As Letana, she was Pepesha's mother, who went by the nickname Lenya when she was younger. She was born and raised in Yuri Orphanage, then gave birth to and raised Pepesha as a single mother in extreme poverty. She was later killed by a thug who pushed her off of a bridge, where she fell to her death. In her poverty, she only found happiness when she drank, a trait that Pepesha picked up later on in life. Reincarnated as Tzveta, her youthful appearance makes her resemble Pepesha as a child. In her first appearance, she wore a thick fur coat and was barefoot, but later appeared in a full dark bodysuit with boots and a cloak.
Utsuro Karakururi (ウツロ=カラクルリ) / Mai Tennoji (天王寺 昧, Ten'nōji Mai)
Voiced by: Hitomi Ueda (Japanese); Michelle Rojas (English)
A nihilistic member who has no interests, no values, and only considers herself and the other members as tools for Stigma's operations. As Mai Tennoji, she was a former shinobi who ran away from her home village of Sōga to join Amarariruku. She does not like to fight and prefers to live a peaceful life, which led to her abandoning her shinobi training, killing numerous pursuers that have been trying to return her to her village. Soon after, her attitude changed and she pierced the heart of her sister with a sword radiating evil power, named "Nihil". She wears a short black kimono tied with an obi sash and karuta armor. She has the ability to erase minds. The name "Utsuro" in Japanese can translate to "hollow", which is emblematic of her personality.
Inori Alleluia (イノリ=アレルヤ, Inori Areruya) / Eve Ilhan (イヴ=イルハン, Ivu Iruhan)
Voiced by: Saori Hayami (Japanese); Madeleine Broseh (English)
A nun-like member with the ability to awaken people to love. She wears a long white robe, and is seen with a halo and three pairs of disc-like wings. She believes that love is the strongest power above all else, and that by giving love to others, the circle of love will expand and cover the world. She has the ability to shoot an individual with a magical arrow, resulting in a halo appearing above the head of the affected person, which causes them to develop romantic feelings for the person nearest to them. As Eve, she was Turkish and an orphan who lost her eyesight as a child in the midst of a war, then was found by a priest and spent her life as a nun. She tried to be kind to everyone she came in contact with under the teaching that if you give love, you will receive love back, but this led to the loss of someone she cared about, and out of guilt she took her own life. Her Amarariruku name is a combination of "inori", the Japanese word for "prayer", and a corruption of the English word "hallelujah", an expression of worship.
Quabala Quabala (クァバラ=クァバラ, Kuabara Kuabara) / Clara Valhalla (クララ=ヴァルハラ, Kurara Varuhara)
Voiced by: Izumi Kitta (Japanese); Krystal LaPorte (English)
A specter who loves fear and hates bright places. She has the ability to possess others, and is able to inflict damage she takes on herself to those she possesses. Her lower body is amorphous and ghost-like. She appears to be infatuated with Stigma out of the fear of ever being hated by him. As Clara, she was Romanian, whose family were an activist group who, like Shine, wished for world peace. In contrast to Shine's brilliant achievements, they felt helpless, and little by little, they turned to a life of crime. She ends up shooting and killing her parents in the name of justice in order to stop a bombing, then later shoots and kills herself to avoid confronting the guilt she believed she feels she would face from Shine. Her Amarariruku name comes from the Japanese phrase "Kuwabara kuwabara", used to ward off lightning.
Sekilala Lovesong (セキララ=ラブソング, Sekirara Rabusongu) / Aika Kirahoshi (綺羅星 愛歌, Kirahoshi Aika)
A girl with a yandere personality. She is a talented vocalist that has passion for music, particularly singing. Like Inori, she values love over all else. She wears her hair in croissant-shaped pigtails. She has the ability to attack using sound waves and open space. When she first meets Teru, she instantly falls in love with her, wanting to marry her, where she uses one of Stigma's rings as an "engagement ring" to convert Teru's heart so that she will be "hers forever". As Aika, she was a victim of child sex trafficking which led to her developing severe mental problems as a result. Her instant love for Teru is rooted in the fact that Shine rescued her from that previous life, as Teru, being her sister, bears a strong resemblance to her. Like Kufufu, she also defects to the heroes' side.
Weepy Tearnight (シクシク=ティアナイト, Shikushiku Tianaito) / Namilo (ナミロ, Namiro)
A member who often exhibits signs of deep sorrow, as demonstrated by his frequent expressions of sadness. He loves fish and can take on a merman-like creature His face and hair also bears a strong resemblance to Stigma's. He can manipulate water at will and can also liquefy himself to nullify physical attacks. In the story, he was first seen at the North Pole along with Stigma after the heroes' first encounter with Tzveta. As Namilo, he was the oldest, timid son of a family of fishermen who loved the sea. He dies from getting caught in a huge tsunami that swallows his house and kills his family and friends. His Amarariruku name is Japanese onomatopoeia for a hushed crying sound.
Tarumu Mendosa (タルムー=メンドゥーサ, Tarumū Mendōsa) / Momouna Momoun Mohammed (ムムーナ・ムムーヌ・モハメッド, Mumūna Mumūnu Mohameddo)
A extremely intelligent young man who tends to rely heavily on his underlings to complete tasks and often does not take the initiative himself. He is often seen lying around and complaining about ever having to do anything. He uses corpses as raw materials to create undead creatures called Anlets that serve him. He has the ability to steal vitality from her enemies. He wears a suit that resembles a body bag and his face is covered in scars. As Momouna, he was a scientist and a veterinarian living in the quarantine zone of a war-torn country. He researched Heart hoping to create a device to understand the minds of animals. However, his research would be used against him to create a Heart-powered nuclear missile with high destructive capabilities. Thinking that it would actually be used, he committed suicide out of guilt. His Amarariruku first name in Japanese means "to slack off". He has an undead dog called Anlet.
Ruiz Aitsvakka (ルイズ=アイツヴァッカ, Ruizu Aitsuvakka)
A germaphobic man that looks like a youthful vampire who is considered among the Amarariruku to be the strongest and most level-headed member of the group. His power is extreme jealousy; he is driven by vindictiveness and will find something to envy in all he comes across, as he is able to transform into and copy the appearance and abilities of those he is envious of. As a means of stress relief, he keeps a diary of his jealousy and envy to keep his mind in order. He wears a long black cloak with red lining. He is a compulsive germophobe that tends to bite on a cloth when he is irritated.

== Others ==
Iko Koishikawa (小石川 惟子, Koishikawa Iko)
Voiced by: Nao Tōyama (Japanese); Bryn Apprill (English)
Iko is a 14-year-old girl who was saved by Shy from a runaway roller coaster, although she ended up injuring her leg and permanently scarring her eyebrow in the process, which Shy was blamed for. Shortly thereafter, she was saved again by Shy after having her heart manipulated by Stigma, forcing her to wear one of his rings. She is the first person in the story to have had Stigma's ring placed on her and corrupt her heart. As she grows closer to Teru, she ends up transferring to her school, as it is closer to her home.
Daigo Koishikawa (小石川 ダイゴ, Koishikawa Daigo)
Voiced by: Honoka Inoue (Japanese); Nia Celeste (English)
Daigo is Iko's younger brother. He is a big fan of superheroes, especially of Shy. He was the sole child in the audience at the amusement park hero show who provided her with encouragement, and he was also the one she saved on two occasions: first on the same roller coaster that injured Iko, and again from a burning hotel. Because of their parents' death, Iko is the only family he has to look up to, and such, cares deeply for her.
N. Vilio (エヌ=ヴィリオ, Enu-Virio)
Voiced by: Tomokazu Sugita (Japanese); Nazeeh Tarsha (English)
N. Vilio is Teru's robotic hero partner whom she calls "Shrimpy" (えびお, Ebio) since it looks like a shrimp. It acts as a guide to help Teru throughout her missions by giving her advice and instructions. It can open portals to help Teru conveniently travel to other places in the world, and can also project holograms out through its head. There are many other models like it that live on Space HQ with Unilord.
Ai Tennoji (天王寺 曖, Ten'nōji Ai)
Voiced by: Kotori Koiwai (Japanese); Molly Zhang (English)
Ai is a shinobi and princess of Sōga Village. Unhappy with being sheltered in her home dwelling, she ran away in search of freedom and a longing to see the outside world. She is Mai's older sister, who was a shinobi along with her, but was stabbed in the heart by her sister's sword. The wound did not kill her, yet it left her deeply injured and caused damage to her motor functions. Like her sister, she carries a sword, named "Purity", which has the power to know the feelings of those who touch it.
Tokimaru (朱鷺丸)
Voiced by: Hiro Shimono (Japanese); Charles Nguyen (English)
Tokimaru is another shinobi from Sōga Village who is tasked with protecting Ai. He identifies himself as having come from a neighboring village to serve the Tennoji family, and is welcomed into Sōga as a disciple of Ai. His true form is that of a heron that Ai and Mai found injured when the two sisters were children. Since then he has been friends them, as they all endured the same shinobi training together. At first, he tries to force Ai to return to her village, but later decides to let her do as she wishes, all while still watching over her from afar.
