= Kobutori Jiisan =

Japanese folk tale

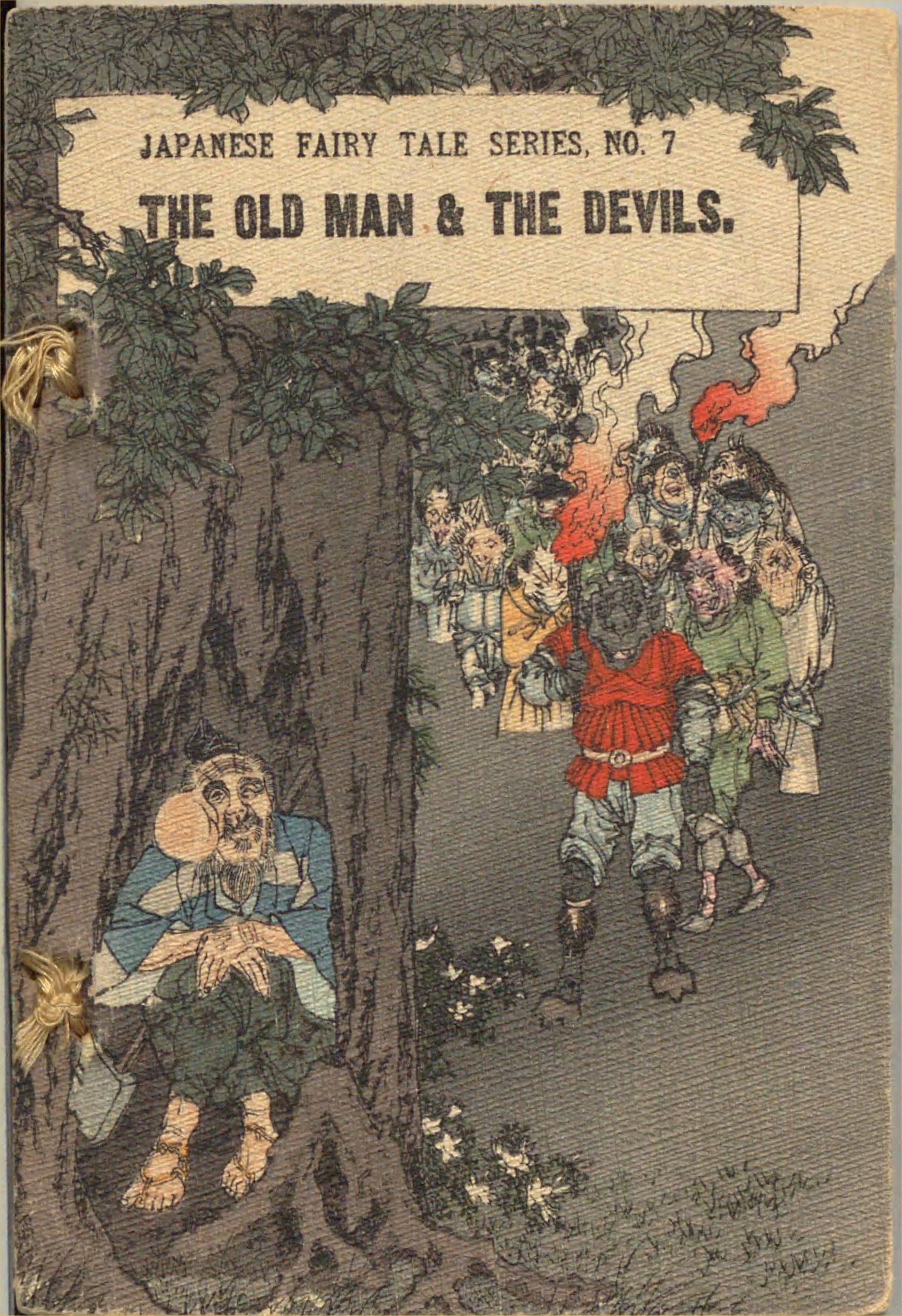
Old man with lump sees the oni marching. ―Cover of the 1886 translation.

"Kobutori Jiisan" (こぶとりじいさん, Kobutori jīsan) translated directly as "Lump-Taken Old Man" is a Japanese folktale about an old man who had his lump (or parotid gland tumor) taken or removed by demons after joining a party of demons (oni) celebrating and dancing in the night.

The tale is a rendition of a tale about a woodcutter (firewood-gatherer) from the early 13th-century anthology Uji Shūi Monogatari.

== Textual notes ==
The tale, which is most commonly known in Japanese as "Kobutori" (瘤取り), "Kobutori Jiisan" (瘤取り爺さん), or "Kobutori jijii" (瘤取り爺い), is arguably among the top ten native fairy tales that are frequently recounted to children in modern Japan.

=== English translations ===
In 1886, the tale was translated as The Old Man and the Devils by James Curtis Hepburn. (Note: This title was No. 7 of the English-translated Japanese Fairy Tale Series, produced by wood-block printing on crepe paper by Hasegawa Takejirō. The illustrator for the volume is indeterminate.)

Hepburn translated the oni as "devils" where a more modern editions might give "demons" or "ogres", but it was commonplace during this time period to replace native Japanese concepts with equivalent Christian ones in these translated stories. (Note: Cf. Shippeitaro where the temple becomes a "chapel".)

"How an Old Man Lost his Lump" by Yei Theodora Ozaki (1903) was a retelling based on a published Japanese text edited by Sazanami Iwaya. Though not a literal translation by her own admission, it has been assessed as deserving more credit as to its fidelity. (Note: Lucy Fraser, lecturer in Japanese at the University of Queensland, Australia.)

There was one other translation also using Sazanami Iwaya as the Japanese textual source, namely "The Old Man with the Wen" translated by M. E. Kirby (volume 10 of 12 in the Iwaya's Fairy tales of Old Japan series, Eigaku-Shimpo-sha, 1903). However, when the tale was reissued in the compendium edition Iwaya's Fairy tales of Old Japan (1914), only Hannah Riddell was given translator credit.Riddell tr. (1914) (Note: There were several translators other than Riddell (e.g., Fanny Greene), who may have been responsible for Englishing any given tale.)

A similar version "Story of the Man with the Lump", which names the locale as "Mount Taiko", was printed in the Transactions of the Japan Society in 1885. A more recent translation effort is "Lump off, Lump On" (1987) by Royall Tyler.

== Plot ==
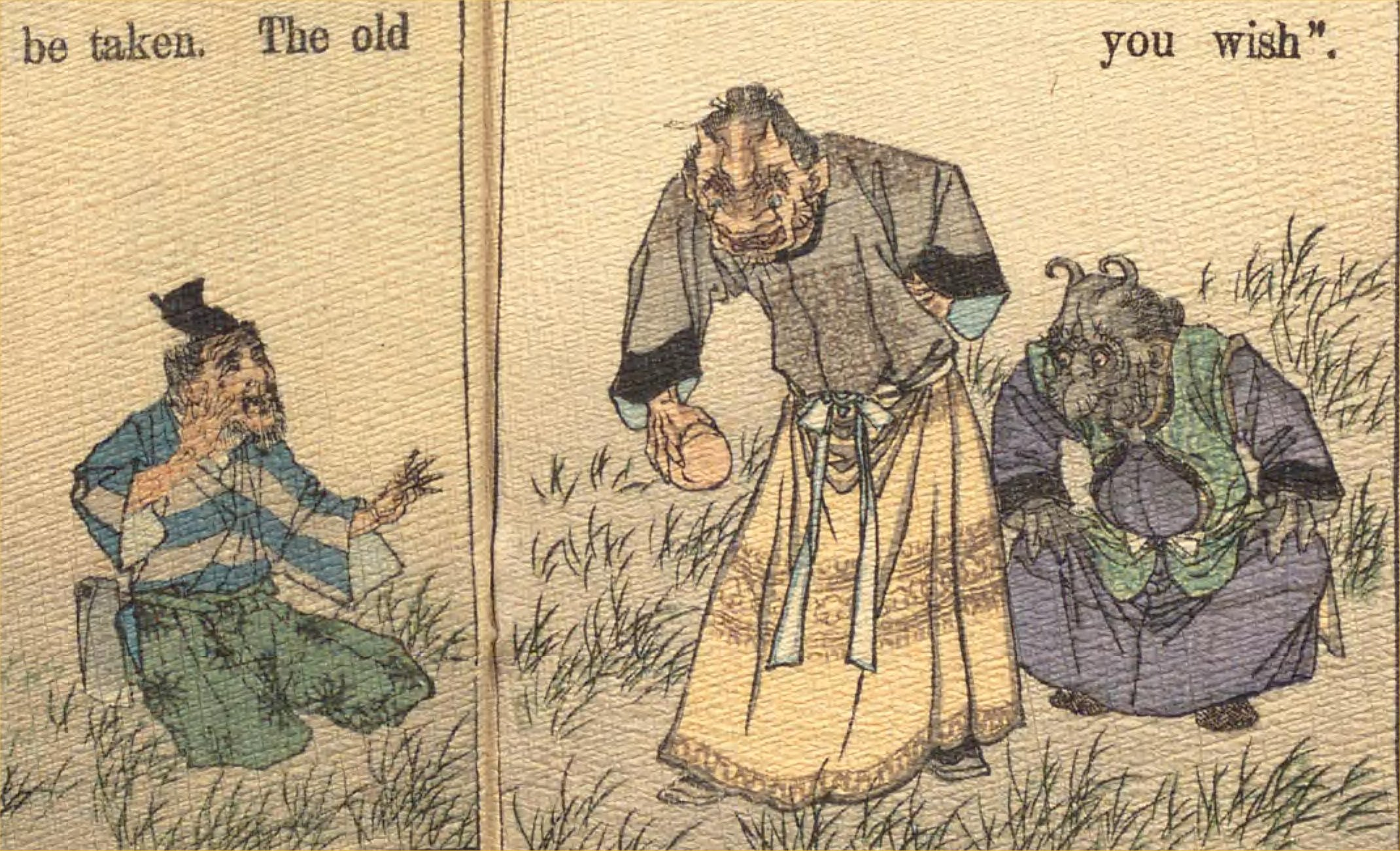
The man's lump is taken by the oni (demons).

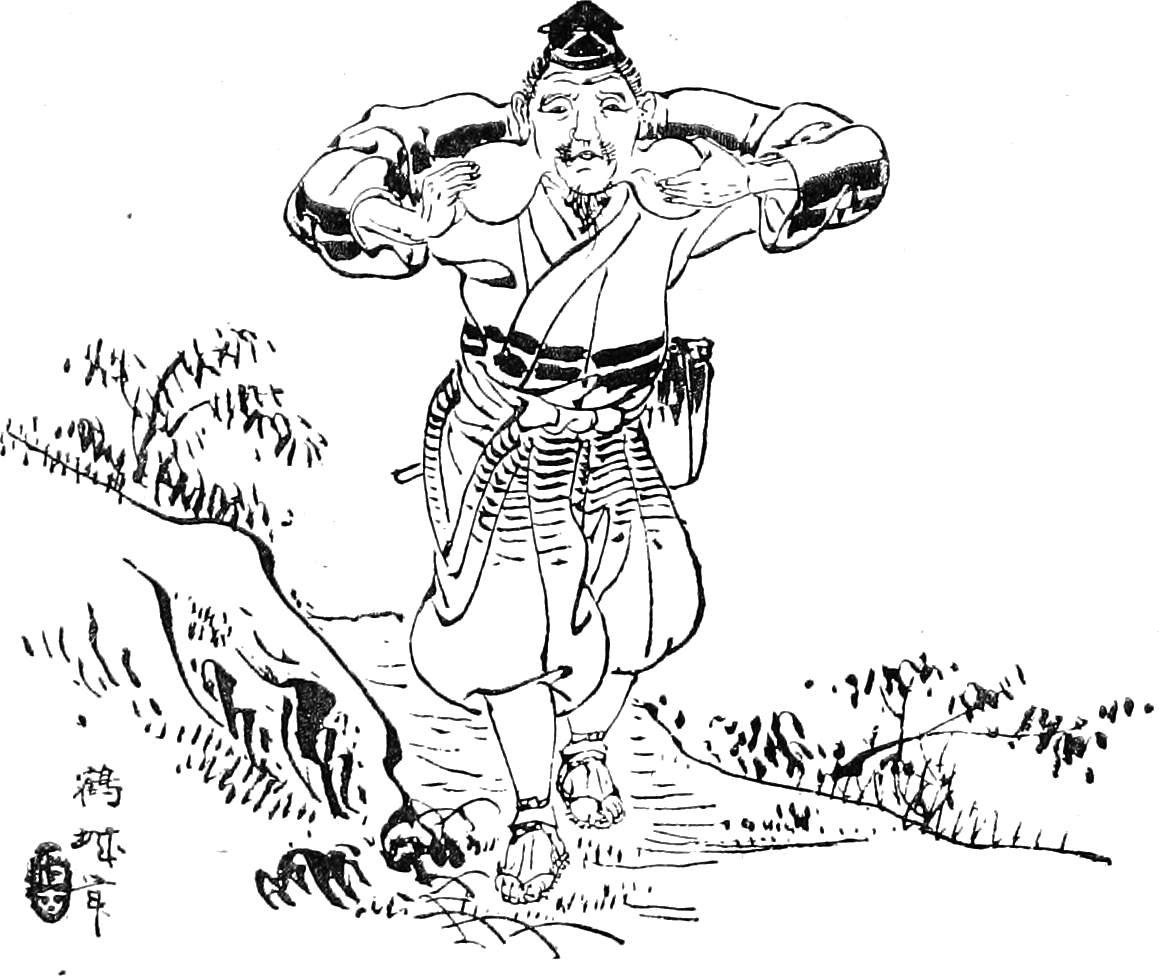
The second old man returns home with two lumps on his face

There was an old man with a lump on the right side of his face. (Note: In Iwaya (1927), Riddell tr. (1914), and Ozaki (1903), the swelling was a source irritation and he tried to remove it consulting the physician.) (The lump was caused by a parotid gland tumor 耳下腺腫瘍 aka salivary gland tumor.) Ozaki's translation describes the lump to be "like a tennis-ball", while the Spanish translation makes the lump to be the size of a peach (Spanish: melocotón). (Note: Compare with the "orange" size lump (more precisely a "large-type orange", conjectured be natsumikan), according to the medieval Uji Shūi Monogatari version of the tale. See below.)

One day he went into the mountain to cut wood, and was caught in the rain. He took refuge in the hollow of a tree. (Note: A hollow (うろ) by the root of a large tree. In Ozaki (1903), the old man first sees a charcoal-burner's hut. There are additional details in Iwaya (1927), p. 136–137 (and Riddell tr. (1914)) the old man sees a flash of lightning and chants "Kuwabara kuwabara". He then expected to see "the other wood-cutters" (他の木樵達). Note that in the medieval tale he is unequivocably a wood-cutter who earned his living selling firewood.) He was soon to witness a gathering of strange beings nearby, some one-eyed and some mouth-less. (Note: One-eyed individuals are illustrated in Hepburn (1888) but the details is wanting in the Iwaya (1927) Japanese and Riddell tr. (1914). One-eyed and mouthless contingents in the oni horde are mentioned in the medieval Uji Shūi Monogatari version. See below.) They were the oni (demons or ogres; "devils" being the Christendom equivalent). (Note: Rendered "demons" Ozaki (1903), Riddell tr. (1914); "devils" Hepburn (1888); "monsters" Tyler (1987).)

The oni created a great bonfire as bright as day. They began to drink sake, sing, and dance. The old man overcame his fears and was lured to join the dance. The greatly entertained oni wanted him to return the next day (or "always") for an encore. To ensure the old man's return, the oni wanted keep custody of some valuable possession, and of all things, decided the old man's lump should be taken as pledge. They then proceed to remove the unwanted tumor. The old man was elated to find the lump gone, with not a remnant of it remaining, and no soreness in the cheek where it was removed.

There lived next door an old man who had a big lump on his left cheek. When he heard his neighbor's story about losing the lump, he wanted to emulate, and therefore asked to take the place of performing in front of the oni, and the neighbor yielded him the opportunity. The left-lump old man went to the same tree hollow, and when the oni assembled, the chief demon was particularly eagerly awaiting. Unfortunately, the left-lump old man did not have the same level of skill in the art of dancing, and was a disappointment to the demons, who bid him to take home another lump and leave. And the demons slapped on (or threw) the piece of flesh which stuck clean to the side of his face, (Note: Iwaya (1927), p. 146: (瘤をば頬（ほっ）ぺためがけて打ちつけ) literally "struck aiming at the cheek", and Iwaya (1911) has the (おしつける) literally "press at", which Ozaki (1903) and Riddell tr. (1914) translate as "threw at". The medieval tale actually agrees: (今片方の顔に投げ付けたりければ) tr. "threw the wen at the old man's other cheek"..) and this old man returned home chagrined, now with two lumps on his face.

A silent animation adaptation of the story.

== Origins ==
This folktale can be traced to the tale collection Uji Shūi Monogatari compiled in early 13th century. The Kamakura period version has been translated as "How Someone Had a Lump Removed by Demons"(鬼にこぶとらるる事).

Here the man explicitly "made his living gathering firewood". The oni demons are of assorted variety, and some are picturesquely described: red ones wearing blue, black ones wearing red and sporting loincloths (or wearing a red loincloth), some one-eyed, and some mouthless. The Kamakura period version concludes with a one-liner moral cautioning against envy. Also it is added in the variant text that the lump was the size of an orange (大柑子, ōkōji), and this prevented him from engaging in a profession that mingles with people. It is speculated this refers to the citrus variety known today as natsumikan.

== Analysis ==
=== Variants ===
The version given by A. B. Mitford in 1871 "The Elves and the Envious Neighbour" features two men with a lump on their foreheads, and the second visitor earns another lump on top of his own. The second man could not be faulted for his poor dancing or companionship, and it was just a case of mistaken identity. Mitford's version also concludes with a moral against envy.

Another version called Two lumps (瘤二つ, Kobu futatsu), the protagonist priest has a tumor above his eye. A collection by Kunio Yanagita. In this version, the tumor was taken by tengu ("long-nosed demons"), and given to the second priest. Then, the second priest suffered an ill fate despite his dancing being entertaining enough. The locality of the tale was not given.

=== Analogues ===
The kobutori tale has been finely classified as tale type AT 503A "The Gifts of the Tengu" by Hiroko Ikeda, but is type 503 "The Gifts of the Little People" for purposes of cross-referencing international analogues.

==== Asian analogues ====
There is a Chinese analogue to be found in Yang Maoqian's book Xiaolinping (1611). (Note: As already noted during the Edo Period by Kitamura Nobuyo in his Kiyūshōran (1830).) A version written in Chinese also occurs in Sango (産語) edited by Dazai Shundai and published 1749, (Note: A woodcutter with a lump on his nape has it removed by oni, and a different man of the hamlet with a lump on his neck gets a second lump.) and purports to be a reprint of texts lost before the Han Dynasty, but the general consensus is that this is "faked/mocked ancient text" (疑古文) by the editor.

A number of specimens of the analogous tale also occurs in Korea. (Note: Ch'oe In-hak (崔仁鶴（チェ・インハク）) 최인학 Kankoku mukashibanashi no kenkyū classifies the Korean version as "476 the old man with his lump removed", and specifies 11 tale examples.) Tōru Takahashi translated one version of the Korean Kobutori (1910). Here the first old man deceives the goblins (dokkaebi) and sells off his lump as the source of his bel canto voice. The second old man with a lump was a fine singer too, but receives the detached lump which goblins discovered to be useless. Ch'oe In-hak's selected anthology (1974) also includes a kobutori tale (in Japanese).

The tale in Hangul, entitled Hok tten iyagi or "Wen-taking story" (혹 뗀 이야기) was later printed in the 1923 edition of the Korean-language Reader, (Note: Korean: 보통학교조선어독본; Hanja: 普通學校朝鮮語讀本; RR: Botong hakgyo joseoneo dokbon; MR: Pot'ong hakkyo Chosŏnŏ tokpon.) which also gave an illustration of the goblin. But the textbook was issued under Japanese control (Government-General of Korea). Kim Jong-dae of Chung-Ang University who is an expert on the Korean goblin thinks the tale was imported into Korea from Japan in the Colonial Period (1910–1945).

However, scholar Bak Mikyung who earned her doctorate at Kyoto University, has pointed out that if the story "The Story of Hok Lee and the Dwarfs" printed by Andrew Lang in 1892 is a Korean tale, this would set the date of its establishment in Korea to at least the pre-colonial era. Although Lang represents the tale as translated from the Chinese (it is also set in China), the protagonist's name Hok means "wen" or "lump" in Korean and may indicate its actual origins.

==== European parallels ====
Charles Wycliffe Goodwin noticed that the Japanese "Kobutori" tale closely paralleled the Irish "The Legend of Knockgrafton", presenting his finding in 1875, though this was not printed for the public at large until 1885. (Note: And in the interim, the observation of the parallel attributed to Goodwin had been printed in 1878 by George(s) Bousquet, a fellow jurist-folklorist resident in Japan.) The Irish tale had been published by Thomas Crofton Croker c. 1825, and Goodwin first noticed the similarity after reading Mitford's brief version of the Japanese tale. Goodwin subsequently obtained a fuller version of the story which he printed in his paper. The resemblance of "The Legend of Knockgrafton" to the Japanese folktale was also noted by Joseph Jacobs in 1894. Moreton J. Walhouse, another jurist serving in India, also regurgitated this parallel in a 1897 paper entitled "Folklore Parallels and Coincidences".

Joseph Bédier in 1895 noted the resemblance between the Japanese tale and a tale from Picardy which contains the same formula as the Irish one: the fairies sing the beginning days of the week, and the second hunchback upsets them by adding days.
