= Sazanami Iwaya =

Japanese writer (1870–1933)

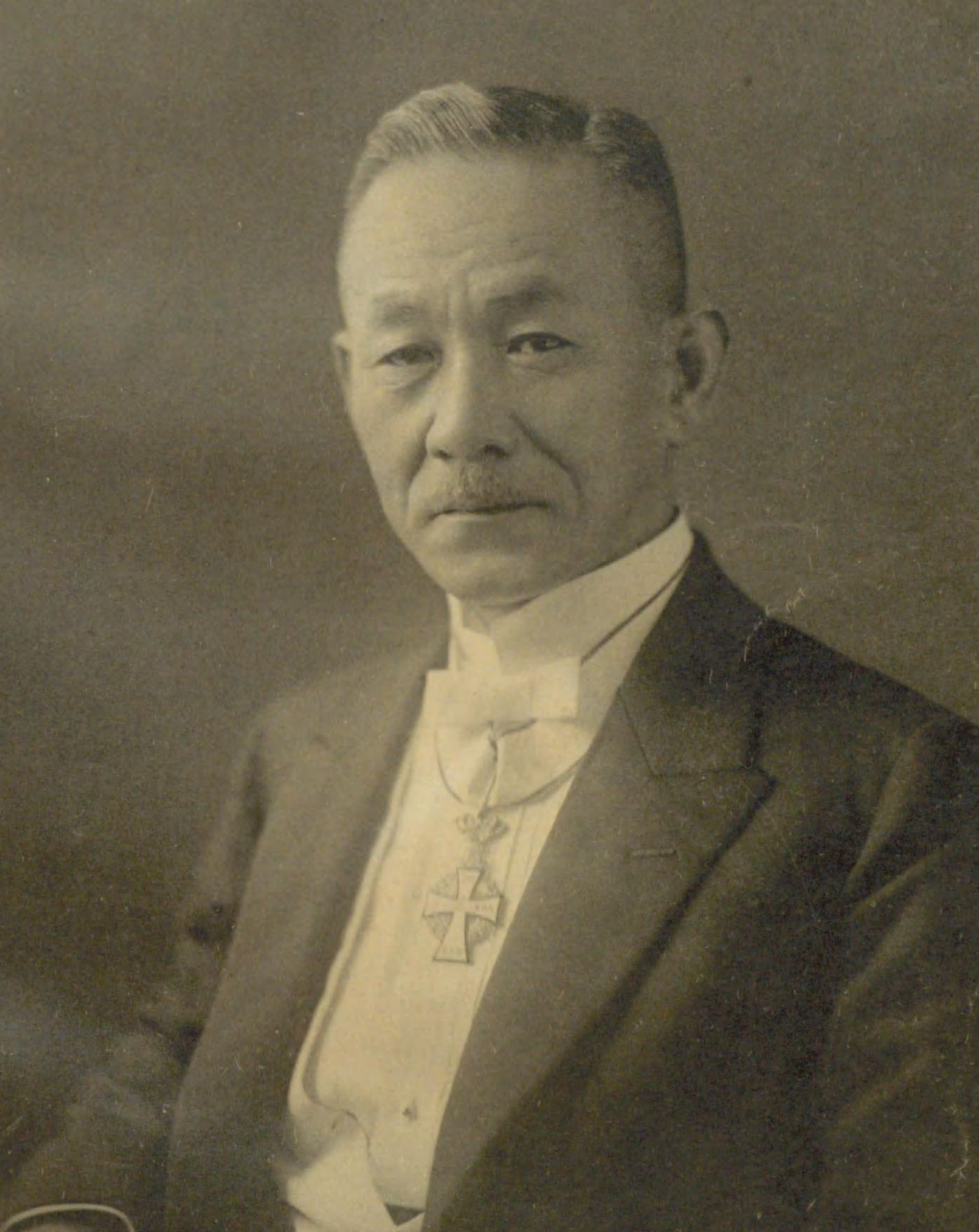
- Born: 6 June 1870
- Died: 5 September 1933
- Occupations: Writer, children's writer

Sazanami Iwaya (巖谷 小波, Iwaya Sazanami; 4 July 1870 - 5 September 1933) was a Japanese writer, children's author, oral storyteller, German literature scholar, journalist and haiku poet from the Meiji and Taishō eras. His birthname was Sueo Iwaya (巖谷季雄, Iwaya Sueo). Pseudonyms include Sazanami Sanjin (漣山人), Rakutenkyo (楽天居) and Ōe Sazanami (大江小波).

He is regarded as a pioneer of Japanese children's literature who ushered the history of modern children's literature by publishing Japan's first original children's story, “Koganemaru” (Hakubunkan, 1891).

== Work ==
He used the term otogibanashi (お伽噺) to describe children's literature and art works during the Meiji period (1868-1912), and spread children's literature throughout Japan through magazines such as “Shōnen Sekai,” “Shōjo Sekai,” and “Yōnen Sekai,” of which he was editor in chief.

He has published a series of books, including Nihon mukashi banashi (日本昔噺, Old Tales of Japan) (24 volumes), Nihon otogibanashi (日本お伽噺, Fairy Tales of Japan) (24 volumes), and Sekai otogibanashi (世界お伽噺, Fairy Tales of The World)” (100 volumes), Japan's first authorial children's book series, and has systematically retold folk tales from Japan and around the world.

Many of the folktales and heroic tales, such as “Momotarō,” “Kintarō,” “Urashima Tarō,” and “Kobutori Jiisan” were retold by Sazanami and reached the hands of young readers. His retellings were first translated into English by Yei Theodora Ozaki as The Japanese Fairy-Book (1903).
