= Jogaku Sekai =

Women's magazine in Japan (1901–1925)

- Categories: Women's magazine
- First issue: January 1901
- Final issue: June 1925
- Company: Hakubunkan
- Country: Japan
- Based in: Tokyo
- Language: Japanese

Jogaku Sekai (女学世界; the World of Women's Learning or Women's Education World) was a Japanese women's magazine published by Hakubunkan in Tokyo, Japan. It was in circulation between January 1901 and June 1925 during late Meiji era. The magazine became very popular among the Japanese women and was the highest circulation title of Hakubunkan. It was the first Japanese periodical in which schoolgirl speech was covered.

== History and profile ==
The first issue of Jogaku Sekai appeared in January 1901. It was one of the titles produced by the publishing company, Hakubunkan. The magazine targeted girls and young women without no political or feminist approach. Instead, it had a traditional approach towards women and attempted to provide and emphasize the points lacking in women’s education in Japan and to produce "wise wives and good mothers."

Jogaku Sekai mostly covered fiction and published articles on hobbies of Japanese women, including as tea ceremony and composing waka poetry. It contained a readers' section in which letters of the readers were published. It was one of the early ways in Japan to create community of girls and young women. Major contributors were Japanese educators and intellectuals such as Nishimura Shigeki and Miwata Masako.

From its inception in 1901 to the early 1910s the circulation of Jogaku Sekai was 70,000 to 80,000 copies per issue in contrast to other popular magazines which sold 7,000 to 10,000 copies on average. In 1911 it was the second best selling women's magazine after Fujin Sekai.

However, with the introduction of other women's magazines such as Shufu no Tomo the sales of Jogaku Sekai dropped dramatically and therefore, it folded in June 1925.
