= Hakubunkan =

Japanese publishing company

Hakubunkan 博文館新社
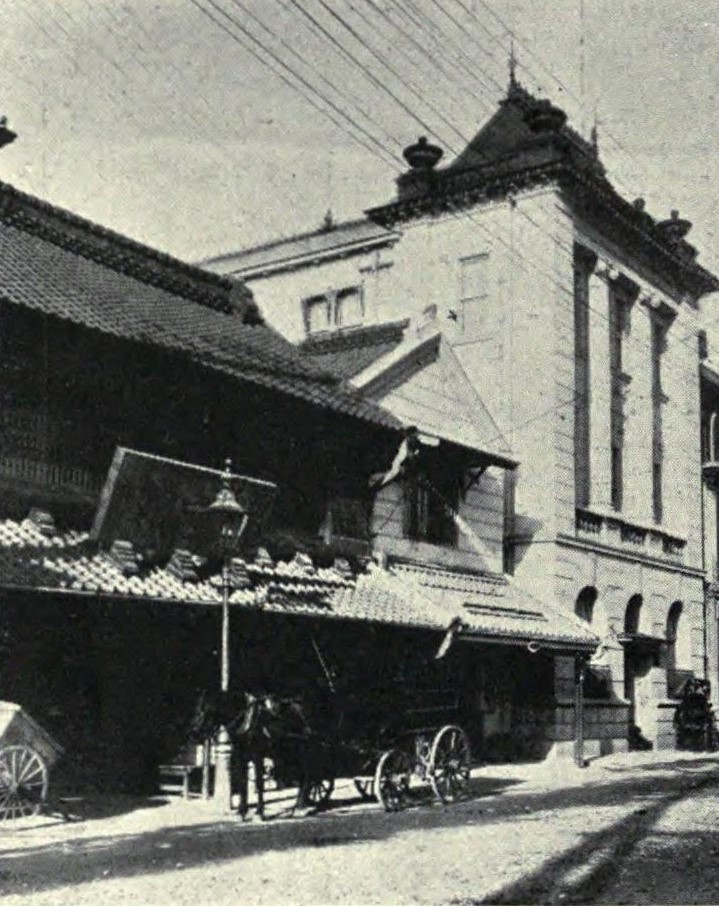
- Industry: Publishing
- Founded: 1887
- Founder: Ōhashi Sahei
- Headquarters: Shinjuku, Tokyo Metropolis
- Area served: Japan
- Services: Book publishing
- Website: http://www.hakubunkan.co.jp/

Hakubunkan (博文館新社, Hakubunkan Shinsha) is a Japanese publishing company founded in 1887 amidst the wealth and military prosperity of the Meiji era. Hakubunkan entered the publishing arena by printing a nationalist magazine as well as expanding into printing, advertising, paper manufacturing, and related businesses, becoming one of Japan's largest publishing companies in the process.

Hakubunkan Shinsha's primary business is now publication of various diaries, journals, and day planners, especially those from the era of the original Hakubunkan company.

Hakubunkan is not related to the Osaka school teaching materials company Hakubun.

== History ==
In 1887, Ōhashi Sahei (大橋 佐平) founded the company in Yumi, Hongō, Tokyo (now part of Hongō, Bunkyō, Tokyo). The company was named after Itō Hirobumi, based on an alternate pronunciation of his given name. Hakubunkan began publishing the magazine Nihon Taika Ronshū (日本大家論集; lit. Japan Expert Treatise Collection) in 1887 as well. One of the most famous stories to appear in the magazine was The Usurer (Konjiki Yasha) (also known as The Golden Demon) by Ozaki Kōyō, who based two of the characters in the play on Ōhashi Shintarō (大橋 新太郎) (son of the founder of the company) and Tomiyama Tadatsugu.

Hakubunkan then established Tōkyōdō (the predecessor of Tōkyōdō Shoten and Tohan Corporation) in 1891. The following year, Tōkyōdō moved to Hongoku, a neighborhood of Nihonbashi in Tokyo (now located in Chūō). In 1893, Tōkyōdō became a domestic and foreign news agency. At the beginning of 1895, Hakubunkan began publishing the general interest magazine Taiyō (太陽; lit. Sun). The Hakubunkan Printing Office (predecessor of Kyodo Printing) was then established in 1896.

In the years 1895-1933 Hakubunkan published Bungei Kurabu (文芸倶楽部; lit. Literary Club), the "first large-scale literary magazine in Japan directed at a mass audience". Its early contributors included Kawakami Bizan, Hirotsu Ryurō, Kosugi Tengai, Izumi Kyoka and Higuchi Ichiyo.

To celebrate its fifteenth anniversary, Hakubunkan opened the free private Ōhashi Library (大橋図書館, Ōhashi Toshokan) (now the Sankō Library) on June 15, 1902. The library is located in the Shiba Park neighborhood of Minato Ward in Tokyo.

Due to the Great Kantō earthquake in 1923, the building which housed the headquarters of Hakubunkan was destroyed by fire, and the company relocated to the Tozaki area of Koishikawa, Tokyo (now part of Bunkyō Ward). After the magazine Taiyō ceased publication in 1927, Hakubunkan continued to operate in the red, finally splitting into three companies in 1948: Hakuyūsha, Kōyūsha, and Kōbunkan. Hakuyūsha began using the Hakubunkan name again in 1949 before changing it again to Hakubunkan Shinsha in 1950.

== Magazines ==
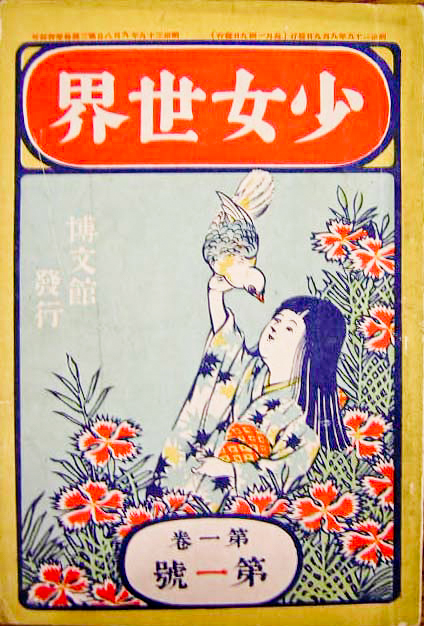
First issue of the first year (1906) of Shojo Sekai

Hakubunkan has published many magazines, including the following:

- Bōken Sekai (冒険世界, January 1908 - December 1919) was succeeded by Shinseinen.
- Bungei Club (文芸倶楽部, January 1895 - January 1921) changed its title to Shin Bungaku (新文学) from January 1921 issue, then later inherited to Shin Shumi until 1933.
- Bunshō Sekai (文章世界, March 1906 - February 1921) changed its title to Shin Bungaku (新文学) from January 1921 issue, then was succeeded by Shin Shumi.
- Chūgaku Sekai (中学世界; September 1898 - May 1928)
- Jogaku Sekai (女学世界; January 1901 - June 1925)
- Kōdan Zasshi (講談雑誌, April 1915 - 1954) was later changed its publisher to Kōdanzasshisha to Bunyūkan then to Hakuyūsha.
- Nihon Taika Ronshū (日本大家論集, June 1887 - December 1894) was succeeded by Taiyō.
- Nōgyō Sekai (農業世界; April 1906 - 1968), changed its publisher to Nōgyō Sekaisha to Hakuyūsha.
- Pocket (ポケット; September 1918 - March 1927)
- Shin Seinen (新青年, January 1920 - July 1950) changed its publisher from Ekoda Shobō to Bunyūkan then to Hakuyūsha.
- Shin Shumi (新趣味, January 1922 - November 1923)
- Shōjo Sekai (September 1906 - October 1931)
- Shōnen Sekai (January 1895 - January 1933?)
- Shōnen Shōjo Tankai (少年少女譚海; January 1920 - March 1944), published from January 1940 as Kagaku to Kokubō Tankai)
- Taiyō (太陽, January 1895 - February 1928)
- Tantei Shōsetsu (探偵小説), September 1931 - 1932)
- Yakyūkai (野球界; November 1908 - October 1959) was transferred from Yakyūkaisha to Hakuyūsha, while magazine title was changed a few times.
- Yōnen Gahō (幼年画報; January 1906 - 1935)
- Yōnen Sekai (幼年世界; January - December 1900, January 1911 - October 1923)

=== List of volumes ===
- 太陽, Volume 3 (1897) (Taiyō, Volume 3 (1897))

== Book series ==
- Jitsuchi oyo gigei hyakka zensho (実地応用･技芸百科全書) (= Encyclopedia of Art and Crafts for General Use) (1889-1893)
- Teikoku bunko (帝国文庫) (= Empire Library) (1893-1897)
- Teikoku hyakka zensho (帝国百科全書) (= Imperial Encyclopedia) (1898-1914)
- Tsuzoku kyoiku zensho (通俗教育全書) (= Complete Popular Education) (1892-1896)
- Nogyo zensho (農業全書) (= Complete Library of Agriculture) (1892-1893)
- Sekai rekishidan (世界歴史譚) (= World History), 35 volumes (1899-1902) - series of biographies of famous people
