= The Legend of Knockgrafton =

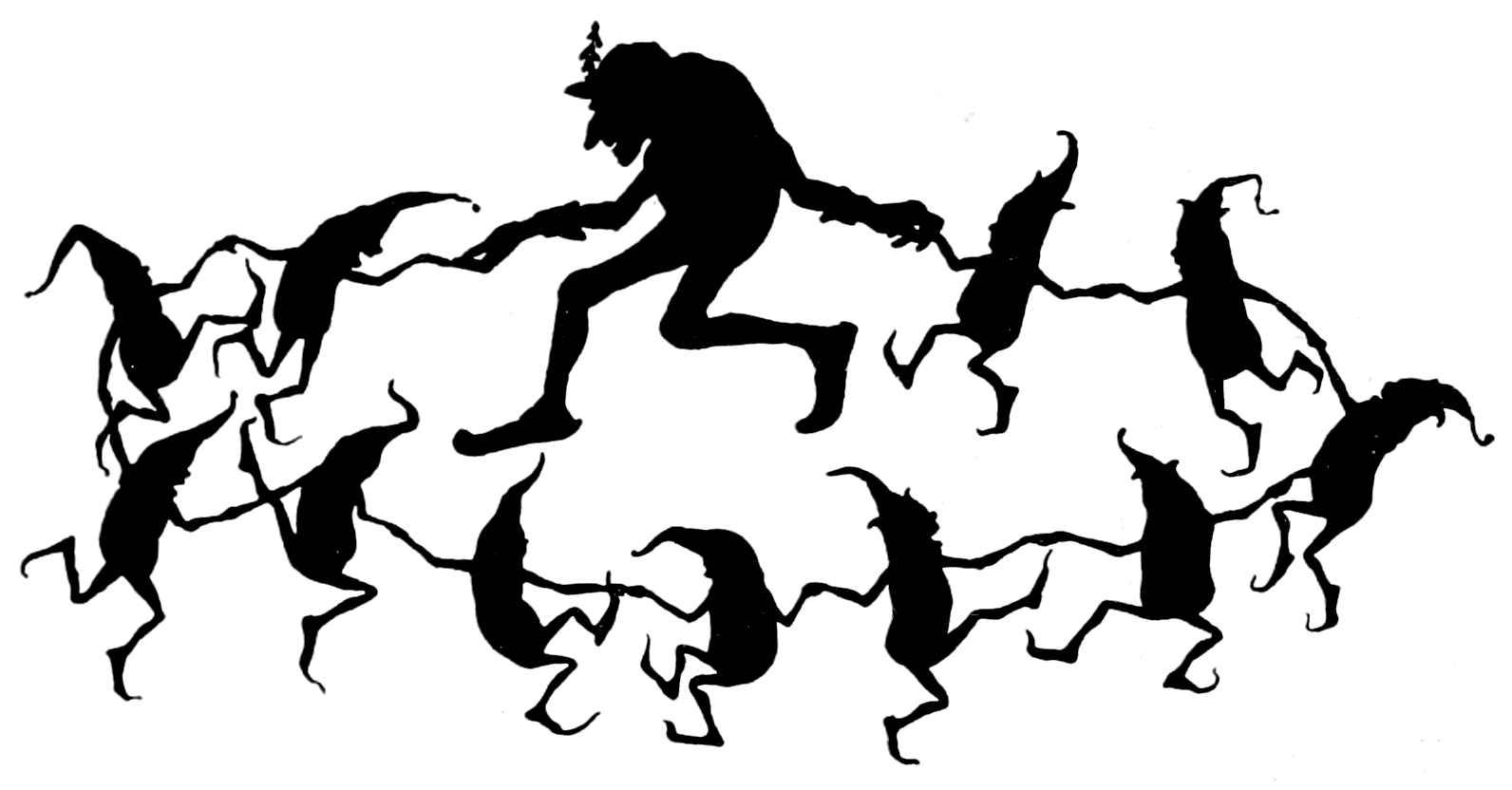
- Lusmore dancing with fairies. ―Illustration by John D. Batten, More Celtic Fairy Tales (1894)

Folk tale
- Name: The Legend of Knockgrafton
- Aarne–Thompson grouping: ATU 503
- Country: Ireland
- Region: Tipperary
- Origin Date: 1825
- Published in: Fairy Legends and Traditions of the South of Ireland

"The Legend of Knockgrafton" is an Irish folk tale/fairy tale published by T. Crofton Croker in Fairy Legends and Traditions of the South of Ireland (1825).

A humpbacked man named Lusmore delights the fairies by revising their fairy song and has his hump removed, while another hunchback Jack Madden angers them and receives a second hump on top of his own. To the fairies' initial chanting of "Monday, Tuesday", Lusmore had added "Wednesday", but Jack improvised with extra days which the fairies disliked.

The tale is classed in the ATU 503 "The Gifts of the Little People" tale group, named after Grimms' KHM 182 known as "Die Geschenke des kleinen Volkes" in German.

== Plot summary ==
The tale was first published in Thomas Crofton Croker's Fairy Legends and Traditions of the South of Ireland (1825). (Note: First published "about the year 1824 or 1825" according to Goodwin.) The plot outline is as follows:

There was a hunchbacked (humpbacked) man who made his living selling his plaited goods woven from straw or rush, nicknamed Lusmore (Irish: lus mór literally "great herb", referring to the 'foxglove') because he habitually wore a sprig of this flower or herb on his straw hat. He dwelt in the Glen of Aherlow, County Tipperary. (Note: Or in the town/village of "Cappagh", as explained below.)

On journey back from peddling, he grew tired and rested near the "moat" (hill or barrow) of Knockgrafton, and as it grew dark, he heard voices inside the barrow singing the refrain of "Da Luan, Da Mort (Monday, Tuesday)". When the singing paused, Lusmore sang back, adding "agus Da Cadine (and Wednesday)" to the strain. This delighted the fairies, and Lusmore was conveyed inside the barrow by a whirlwind. There, he was entertained, and afterwards had his hump removed as reward, together with a new set of fine clothing.

Then an old woman came to visit, saying she was from (the neighbouring) County Waterford, the land of the Decie (Déisi). (Note: The name of people with the spelling "Decie" is discussed, e.g., Samuel Lewis, and clearly refers to the Déisi.) She wished to know the particulars of Lusmore's story, on behalf of a hunchbacked son of her godmother ("gossip"). The hunchback named Jack Madden then traveled to the "moat" to imitate the conduct, but in his irrepressible desire to have the hump removed quickly, he interrupted the fairies, and hoping to be rewarded doubly with clothing, added two more days to the refrain, "Da Dardine, augus Da Hena (Thursday and Friday)". (Note: Hiberno-English: Da Hena, Irish: dia aoine; dé haoine "Friday".) (Note: In the 3rd edition of 1834, the text was corrupted and became "augus Da Cadine, augus Da Hena", and footnoted as "And Wednesday and Thursday", erroneously, as pointed out by Keightley, for "Da Hena" is Friday. While Yeats retained the original correct days, the erroneous version was unfortunately repeated by Joseph Jacobs, as pointed out by a Japanese researcher.) This only angered the fairies, and in retribution, twenty strong members of them brought Lusmore's lump and added it on top of Jack' original hump. Jack later died in grief.

=== Accompanying song ===
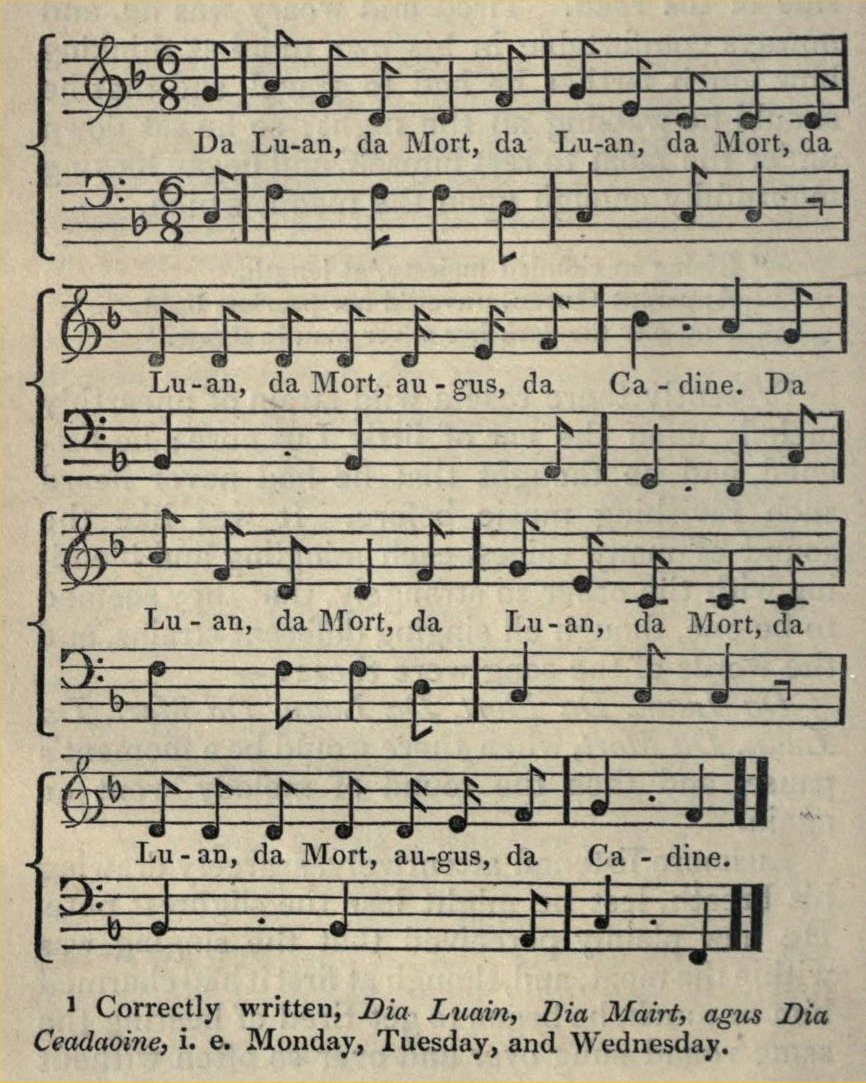
"Da Luan" song.

Croker also supplied the musical notation to the song "Da Luan, Da Mort", taken down by Alexander D. Roche, which he said was typically sung by the storytellers of the tale.

== Authorship ==
It has been suggested that William Maginn may have been the true author of this particular tale. The tale was printed in a 1933 anthology of tales by William Maginn, selected by his nephew (Rev. Charles Arthur Maginn of Sheffield) (Note: The junior Rev. C. A. Maginn, who earlier served as rector in Cork after his namesake father, but later lived in Sheffield),) and was one of four tales from Croker's Fairy Legends. A conflicting account by the author's much younger brother (Rev. Charles Arthur Maginn, M.A., Rector of Killanully, Cork) (Note: The senior Rev. Charles Arthur Maginn, who was Rector of Killanully, Cork when he died at age 72, in 1887.) credits a similar list of four tales to Maginn, but not "The Legend of Knockgrafton". The latter account was based on a copy of Fairy Legends inscribed with notes in Maginn's hand.

== Localization ==
The "Moat of Knockgrafton" was a barrow or tumulus according to Croker, but actually a rath or fort according to others, (Note: And not a "moat" as in a water canal, as Yeats points out.) and is better identified as Knockgraffon (also controversially emended to " Mote of Knockgraffan" by some) in County Tipperary. (Note: The spelling "Knockgraffan" appears to be an emendation based on O'Donovan and Thomas J. Westropp's conviction that this mound was a fort associated with the Kings of Cashel, with the name "Graffan (Graffand)" found in the Book of Rights. But this notion has been challenged as sheer guesswork based on similarity of name, and the site could be explained as just one of several fort mounds erected during the Norman period.) It lies about 3 miles due north of Cahir, the town where Lusmore peddled his wares.

At the start of the tale, Lusmore's place of residence is identified as Glen of Aherlow at the foot of the Galtee Mountains, due west of Knockgraffon. Later Lusmore's village is identified as "Cappagh". (Note: Cappagh was a common name, and several townlands in County Tipperary bear this or derivative name, such as Cappaghrattin in Donohill parish in the barony of Clanwilliam. From Cahir to Aherlow directly is about 10 miles journey west, but via Knockgraffon, closer to 20 miles; going northwest to Cappaghrattin with Knockgraffon en route is also about 20 miles.)

P. W. Joyce remarks that in the south of Ireland, a mound where fairy music are said to be heard is referred to as a lissakeole (Irish: lios a cheoil "fort of music").

== Yeats ==
William Butler Yeats included the tale in his 1888 anthology.

In connection with this tale, it has been remarked by folklorists that Yeats earnestly believed in fairies, and to quote Yeats critic Frank Kinahan: "[Other Irish writers] saw the attractions of faery as dangerous because illusory. Yeats saw them as dangerous because real". (Note: Sundmark, Björn (2006). "Yeats and the Fairy Tale". Nordic Irish Studies. 5: 196. JSTOR 30001546., citing Frank Kinahan, via Castle (2001), p. 57.) (Note: Kinahan has elsewhere dubbed Yeats's undertaking as "Armchair Folklore", so he could probably be fairly characterized as a critic. Kinahan's quote here is not specifically connected with the Knockgrafton legend (it is Björn Sundmark who connects it). Kinahan's quote specifies the writers who considers fairies to be illusory as "[William] Carleton, [Patrick] Kennedy and the Wildes".)

Yeats also claimed real-life experience of being carried away by fairies, as noted by Richard Dorson's survey of Celtic folktale collecting.

As to the whirlwind that carries the humans away into the fairy mound, Yeats has remarked on such wind as something the peasantry regard with real fear and respect.

== Variants and parallels ==
It is thought that a similar tale served as a foundation to Thomas Parnell's verse fairy tale "A Fairy Tale in the Ancient English Style" published posthumously in 1722.

Yeats noted that Douglas Hyde knew of a version from somewhere in Connacht, which featured a fairy song that ran "a penny, a penny, two pence.. ", sung in Irish.

=== European parallels ===
The Grimm Brothers had translated the tale as "Fingerhütchen" (meaning 'Little foxglove') in Irische Elfenmärchen (1826). And in their Kinder- und Hausmärchen they noted other tales from various countries that parallel the fairy tale Die Geschenke des kleinen Volkes (KHM 182). This includes cognate tales from Brittany, such as "Les korils de Plauden" from Souvestre's anthology Le Foyer breton (vol. 2, 1853). The koril in the title is glossed as a type of korrigan dwelling in the moorlands, though other types of korrigan appear also.

A more extensive list of parallels are given in Johannes Bolte and Jiří Polívka's Anmerkungen.

"The Legend of Knockgrafton" has been classed as ATU 503 "The Gifts of the Little People", whose type tale is the aforementioned Grimms' tale "Die Geschenke des kleinen Volkes" (KHM 182).

=== Asian parallels ===
The judge-folklorist Charles Wycliffe Goodwin serving in Japan noticed the close resemblance between the Irish tale and the Japanese tale Kobutori Jiisan ("Old Man with a Wen"), reporting his finding to the Asiatic Society in 1875. Thomas J. Westropp noted the parallel in 1908 believing it had escaped notice, but he was in fact anticipated by several decades. Joseph Jacobs also noted the parallel in his 1894 anthology, and according to Richard Dorson, the tale served as a prime example for Jacobs arguing (in 1891) that Gaelic tales were the best source for studying diffusion of folktales all over the world.

== Literary references ==
Irish playwright Samuel Beckett's novel Watt contains an allusion to the legend.

Kevin Crossley-Holland, who included the tale in his anthology, recalls being told the story at a young age by his father.

== Footnotes ==
Explanatory notes

Citations

== Bibliography ==
texts

- Croker, Thomas Crofton (1825). "The Legend of Knockgrafton". Fairy Legends and Traditions of the South of Ireland. London: John Murray. pp. 23–36.
- —— (1834) [1825]. "The Legend of Knockgrafton". Fairy Legends and Traditions of the South of Ireland. London: John Murray. pp. 14–21.; e-text @ Internet Archive
- Crossley-Holland, Kevin (1986) [1985], "The Legend of Knockgrafton", Folk-tales of the British Isles, New York: Pantheon Books, pp. 9–10, 16–21, ISBN 039456328XKevin Crossley-Holland.
- Grimm, Jacob und Wilhelm (1826). "Fingerhütchen". Irische Elfenmärchen. Leipzig: Friedrich Fleischer. pp. 12–19.
- Grimm, Jacob und Wilhelm (1884). "182. Little Folks' Presents". Grimm's Household Tales: With the Author's Notes. Vol. 2. Translated by Margaret Hunt. G. Bell. pp. 298–301, 460.
- Jacobs, Joseph (1894). "The Legend of Knockgrafton". More Celtic fairy tales. John D. Batten (illustr.). London: John Murray. pp. 156–163.
- Yeats, William Butler (1888), "The Legend of Knockgrafton", Fairy and Folk Tales of the Irish Peasantry, London: W. Scott, pp. 40–45, 320
