= Taiyō (magazine) =

Japanese literary magazine (1895–1928)

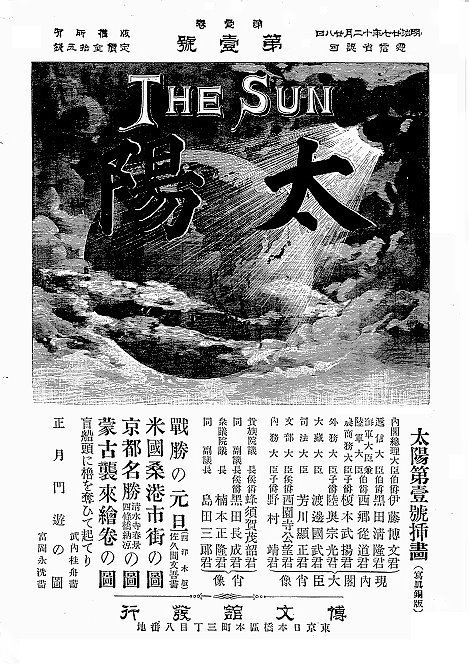
- Taiyō cover
- Categories: Literary magazine
- Founded: 1895
- First issue: January 1895
- Final issue Number: 1928; 34
- Company: Hakubunkan
- Country: Japan
- Based in: Tokyo
- Language: Japanese

Taiyō (太陽; The Sun) was a literary and general interest magazine that existed between 1895 and 1928, which covered the Meiji and Taishō eras. The magazine was published in Tokyo, Japan. It is a significant publication which contains mostly literary criticism, samples of Japanese literature, and translations of literary works by international authors. The magazine was one of the publications of Hakubunkan that made it well-known in the country.

== History and profile ==
Taiyō was founded in 1895, and the first issue appeared in January 1895. Its publisher was Hakubunkan. It was one of the most successful brands of the company. The magazine targeted middle-class people who were middle school graduates, men and women.

Editors of Taiyō included Yoshino Sakuzō (1878-1933), Takayama Chogyū (1871–1902) and Hasegawa Tenkei (1876–1940). It was instrumental in making romanticism and naturalism more popular in the Japanese literary circles. Therefore, the magazine featured translations of the work by major figures of these literary approaches, including Edgar Allan Poe, Gustave Flaubert, Guy de Maupassant, Mark Twain, Maurice Maeterlinck and Leo Tolstoy. Major naturalist Japanese authors whose works were published in the magazine were Tokuda Shūsei, Tayama Katai and Shimazaki Tōson. Japanese author Shimizu Shikin had a column in the magazine for nearly five years. It was entitled Hanazono Zuihitsu (Japanese: Scribblings from a Flower Garden), and she used her real name, Kozai Toyoko, in the column.

The content of Taiyō was comprehensive and was not limited to literary works. The magazine was also influential in using innovative technologies such as photography and illustrations. It frequently carried articles on political, military, economic, and social commentary, the Imperial family, women, commerce, the natural sciences and cultural trends. The magazine frequently covered articles about the Ottoman Empire, which were accompanied by photographs and illustrations.

Takayama Chogyū published articles on literature, philosophy, and aesthetics in the magazine. Masaharu Anesaki wrote for Taiyō under the pen name Anesaki Chōfū, including an article on German composer Richard Wagner's opera work. It was one of the earliest articles about Wagner in Japan. From 1902, Taiyō began to publish selected photographs of natural landscapes in Japan.

Taiyō ended publication in February 1928 after producing 34 volumes and 531 issues. The volumes of the magazine were digitalized by JKBooks on the JapanKnowledge+ platform. A similar archive also exists at the library of the Ohio State University. The texts published in Taiyō were used to generate a corpus of Japanese language.
