= Shiba Tōshō-gū =

Shinto shrine in Tokyo, Japan

Shiba Tōshō-gū 芝東照宮
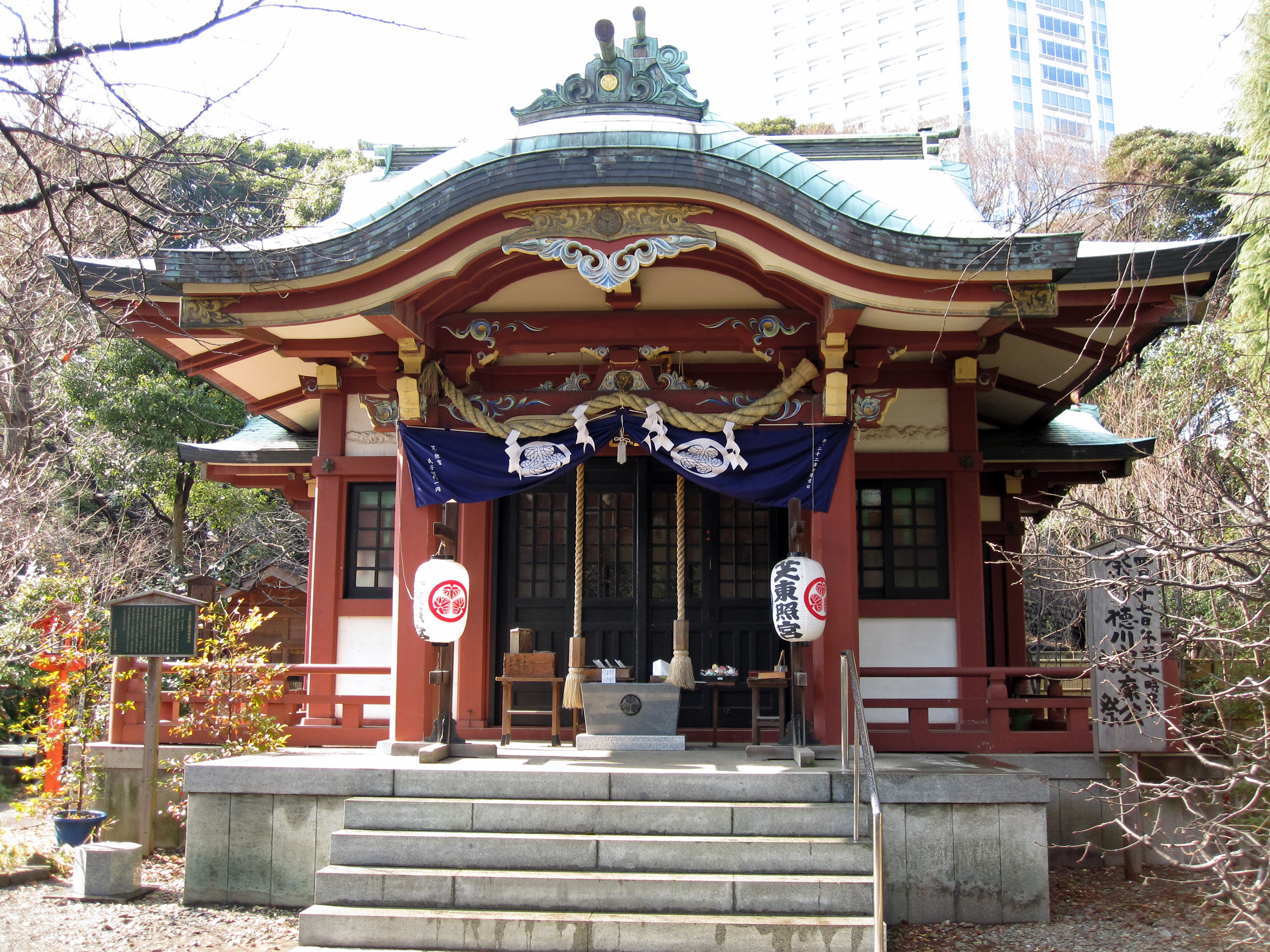
- Front view of the honden

- Location within Japan

Religion
- Affiliation: Shinto
- Deity: Tokugawa Ieyasu
- Type: Tōshō-gū

Location
- Location: 4-8-10 Shiba-koen, Minato, Tokyo 〒 105-0011
- Interactive map of Shiba Tōshō-gū 芝東照宮
- Coordinates: 35.6551°N 139.7486°E

Architecture
- Established: 1617

Website
- www.shibatoshogu.com

Shiba Tōshō-gū (芝東照宮) is a Tōshō-gū Shinto shrine located in the Minato ward of Tokyo, Japan.

Like every other Tōshō-gū shrine, it is characterized by enshrining the first shōgun of the Tokugawa Shogunate, Tokugawa Ieyasu with the name Tōshō Daigongen (東照大権現). The seated wooden statue of Tokugawa enshrined there has been designated an Important Cultural Property by the Tokyo Metropolitan Government.

Located inside Shiba Park, just beside the Buddhist temple Zōjō-ji, an important Jōdo-shū temple and popular attraction, and close to Tokyo Tower, Shiba Tōshō-gū can be included in the same visiting course.

Shiba Tōshō-gū is notable for its giant ginkgo tree, one of the biggest in Tokyo, with a height of 21.5 m (71 ft) and a trunk circumference of 6.5 m (21 ft). It is believed that Tokugawa Iemitsu, the third Tokugawa shōgun, planted the tree himself, when the Tōshō-gū shrine was rebuilt in 1641. Although slightly damaged on the branches and the tip of the trunk, it was designated Natural Monument in 1956. Another giant ginkgo tree of similar characteristics in Tokyo is located in the grounds of Oji Shrine.

== Access ==
There is no admission fee for visitors to enter the temple complex. It opens every day from 7 AM to 7 PM.

The entrance is a 2-minute walk from the Shibakoen Station on the Toei Mita Line, and a 7-minute walk from Akabanebashi Station in the Toei Oedo Line.
