= Shōjo Sekai =

Japanese magazine

- Volume 3 Number 10, published July 1, 1908.
- Editor / Publisher: Sazanami Iwaya
- Categories: Shōjo, fiction, nonfiction, poetry, illustration, photography
- Circulation: 200,000 (peak in 1910)
- Publisher: Sazanami Iwaya
- Founded: 1906
- Final issue: December 1931
- Company: Hakubunkan
- Country: Japan
- Based in: Tokyo
- Language: Japanese

Shōjo Sekai (少女世界; "Girls' World") was one of the first Japanese shōjo magazines. It was published by Hakubunkan from 1906 to 1931 and specializing in children's literature. The magazine focused primarily on shōjo shōsetsu (lit. "girls' novel", a term for illustrated novels and poems aimed at an audience of girls) and only incidentally on manga.

== History ==
The Shōjo Sekai magazine was initially edited by renowned children's author Sueo Iwaya (巌谷 孝雄), better known by the pen name Sazanami Iwaya (巌谷 小波). Shōjo Sekai was created as a sister magazine to Shōnen Sekai (少年世界; "The Youth's World"), which was also edited by Iwaya, and which began publication in 1895.

The magazine's early fiction output tended to be of a didactic nature, with tales about self-sacrifice and the importance of obeying one's parents. The stories then started to focus on passionate bonds between girls, often featuring tones typical of the Class S genre.

According to Kiyoko Nagai, for the first ten years of its publication it was the best-selling shōjo magazine of the time, with peak circulations somewhere between 150,000 and 200,000 copies per issue.

The final issue of Shōjo Sekai was the December 1931 issue.

== Contributors ==
Shōjo Sekai had a number of well known contributors over the years, including the following:

- Sazanami Iwaya (ja:巌谷小波), author, children's author, editor, publisher
- Yasunari Kawabata, novelist and short story author
- Chiyo Kitagawa (北川 千代), children's author
- Tama Morita, essayist
- Midori Osaki (ja:尾崎翠), novelist
- Kikuko Oshima (尾島 菊子), author
- Akiko Yosano, poet, feminist, pacifist, and social reformer
- Nobuko Yoshiya, author
