= Tōkyōdō Shoten =

Tōkyōdō Shoten 東京堂書店
- Industry: Retail bookselling
- Founded: 1891
- Headquarters: 〒101-0051; Tokyo-to, Chiyoda; Kanda-Jinbōchō 1-17
- Area served: Japan
- Services: Bookselling
- Website: http://www.tokyodoshoten.co.jp/

Tōkyōdō Shoten (東京堂書店) is a Japanese retail book store chain founded in 1891 as Tōkyōdō, a book publishing company. After World War II, the company branched out into retail book sales and Tōkyōdō split into two companies: Tōkyōdō Shoten, which continued with the retail book sales part of the business, and Tōkyōdō Publishing, which continued the publishing side of the business.

The main office of Tōkyōdō Shoten is located in the Kanda-Jinbōchō area of Tokyo, sharing a building with one of its Fukurōten (ふくろう店) retail stores and an office of Tōkyōdō Publishing. Its main competitors are the Sanseidō Shoten and Shosen Grande stores.

== History ==
Hakubunkan established Tōkyōdō in 1890 as a retail bookstore in Jinbōchō. The book publishing business was launched the following year, in 1891. In 1941, the company ceased using the Japan Publishing Distribution Company (日本出版配給株式會社, Nippon Shuppan Haikyū Kabushiki Kaisha). Tōkyōdō split into two companies in 1964: Tōkyōdō Shoten and Tōkyōdō Publishing.
