= Ōji Shrine =

Shinto shrine in the Kita-ku ward of Tokyo, Japan

Ōji Shrine 王子神社
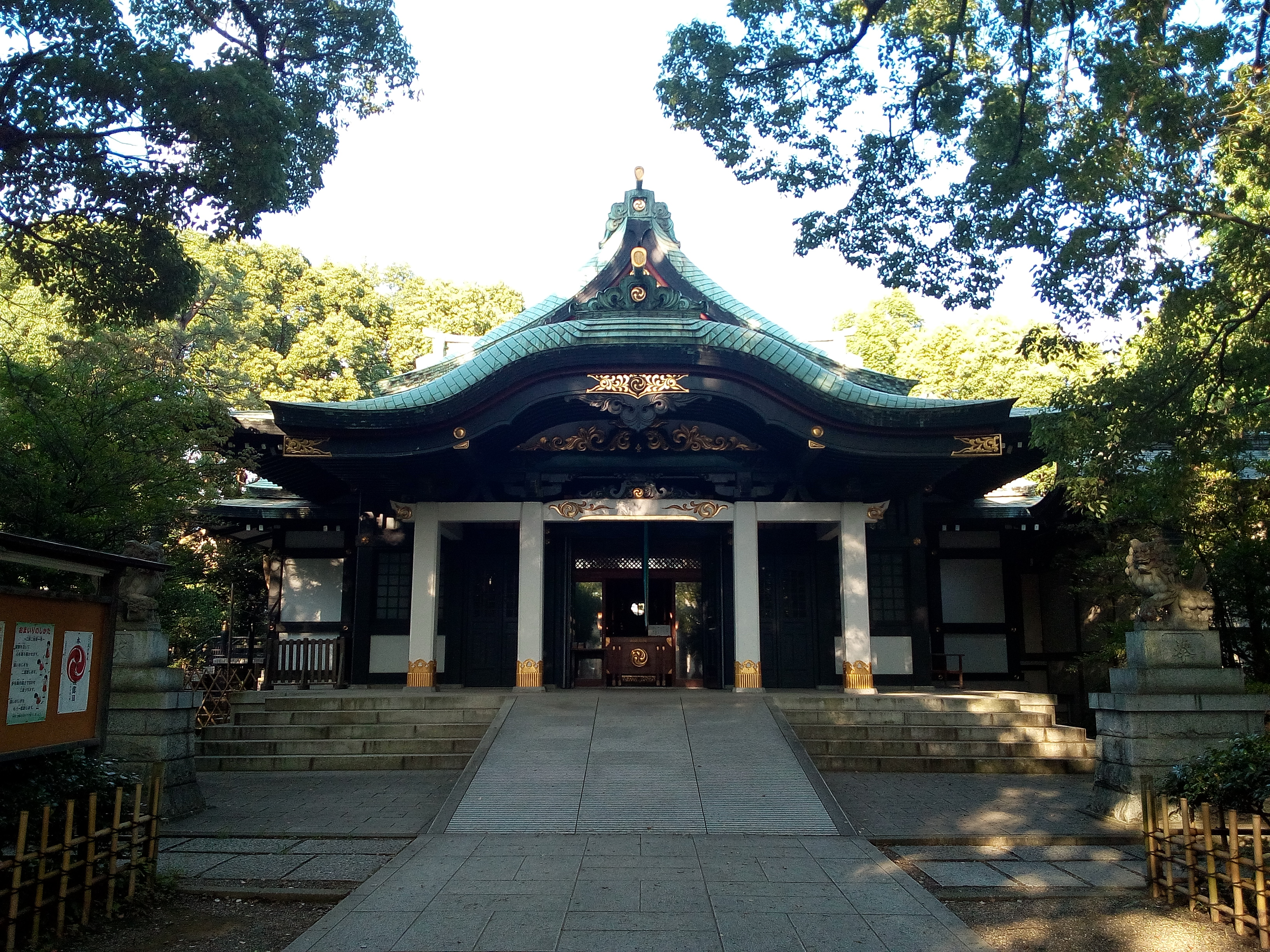
- The honden of Oji shrine

- Location within Japan

Religion
- Affiliation: Shinto
- Deity: Izanami-no-Mikoto; Amaterasu-ōmikami

Location
- Location: 1 Chome-1-12 Ōjihonchō, Kita-ku, Tokyo 〒 114-0022
- Interactive map of Ōji Shrine 王子神社
- Coordinates: 35.7533°N 139.7359°E

Architecture
- Style: Ishi-no-ma-zukuri
- Established: 1320s

Website
- ojijinja.tokyo.jp

Ōji Shrine (王子神社, Ōji-jinja) is a Shinto shrine located in the Kita ward of Tokyo, Japan.

Established during the Kamakura period, most likely around 1321–1324, the shrine gives the name of "Ōji" to this area of the city. Most of the original buildings in the shrine precincts were destroyed during World War II, and were rebuilt from the late 50s to 1982.

It is notable for its giant ginkgo tree, suspected to be 600 years old and designated a Natural Monument in 1939, and for its annual festival (held in August), which includes a mikoshi parade and a performance of dengaku dance.

It is one of the Tokyo Ten Shrines (東京十社, Tokyo Jissha), of which it has been designated as the "northern protector shrine".

== History ==
The exact date in which the Ōji Shrine was founded is not known, but according to a stone with inscriptions (designated a Tangible Cultural Property of Tokyo) still standing beside the ginkgo tree, near the shrine precincts, Toyoshima contributed to found the shrine between 1321 and 1324. The giant ginkgo tree is suspected to have been planted at around this time.

Ōta Dōkan (1432-1486), the samurai and Buddhist monk who designed and built the Edo Castle (now the Imperial Palace), is said to have taken shelter from a storm under a big castanopsis tree in the shrine precincts which was destroyed, probably during World War II.

The area of the Kita-ku ward surrounding it receives the name of "Ōji" from the shrine.

== Architecture ==
Most of the original buildings of Ōji Shrine were destroyed in 1945 during World War II, and were rebuilt in 1959-1964 and in 1982.

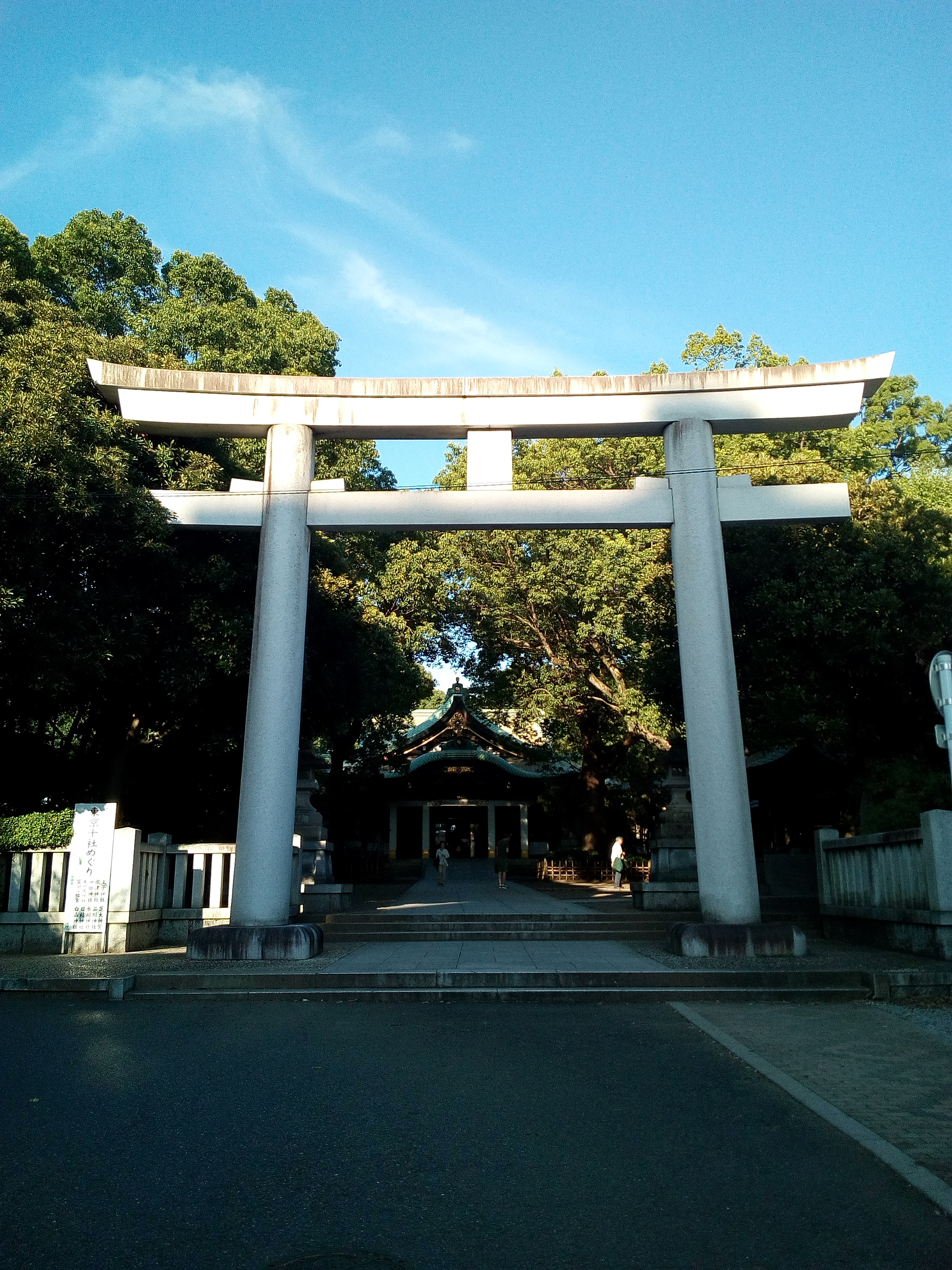
myōjin torii at the main entrance

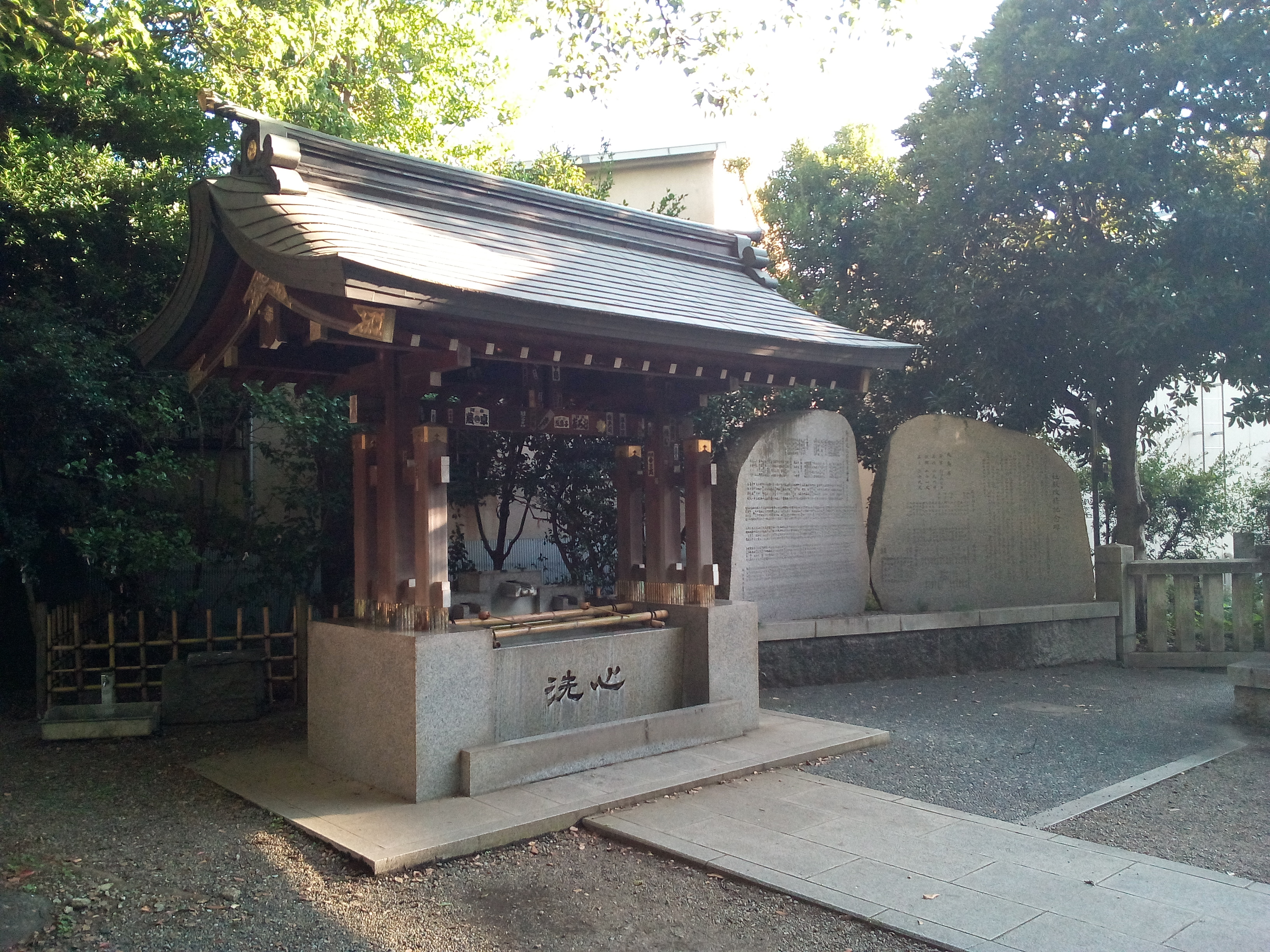
Chōzuya at Ōji shrine

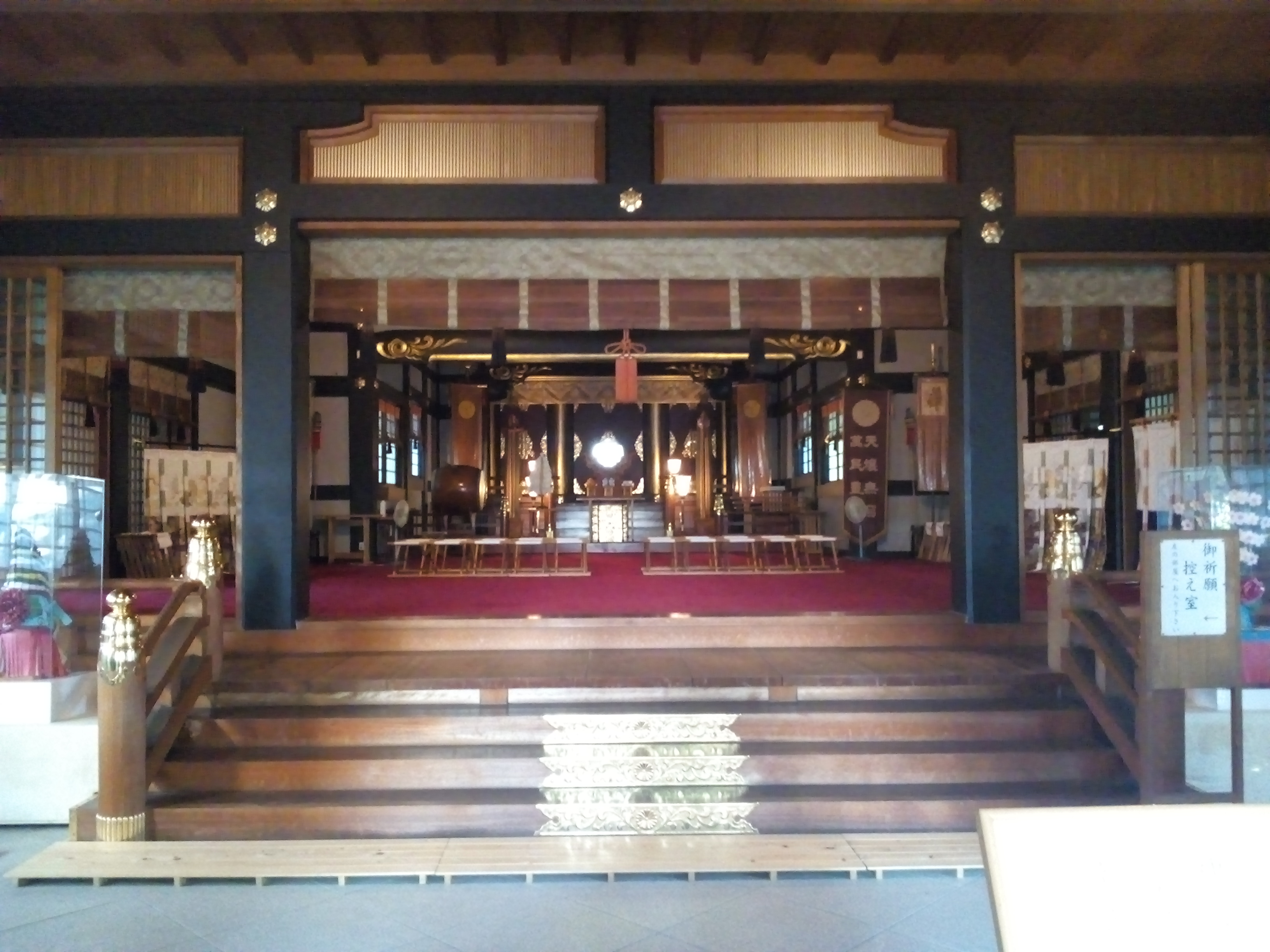
Interior of the Honden

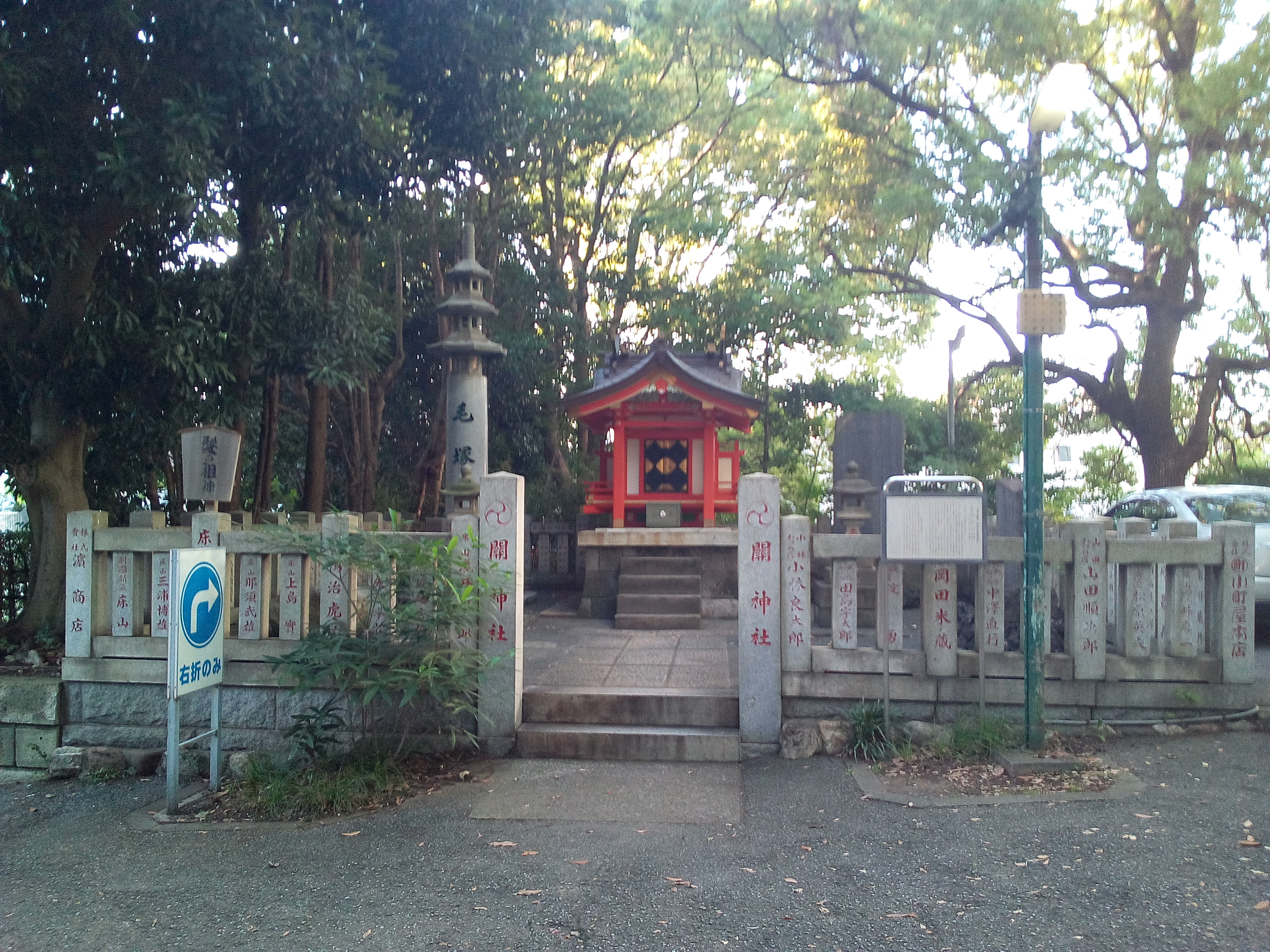
Seki Jinja subsidiary shrine

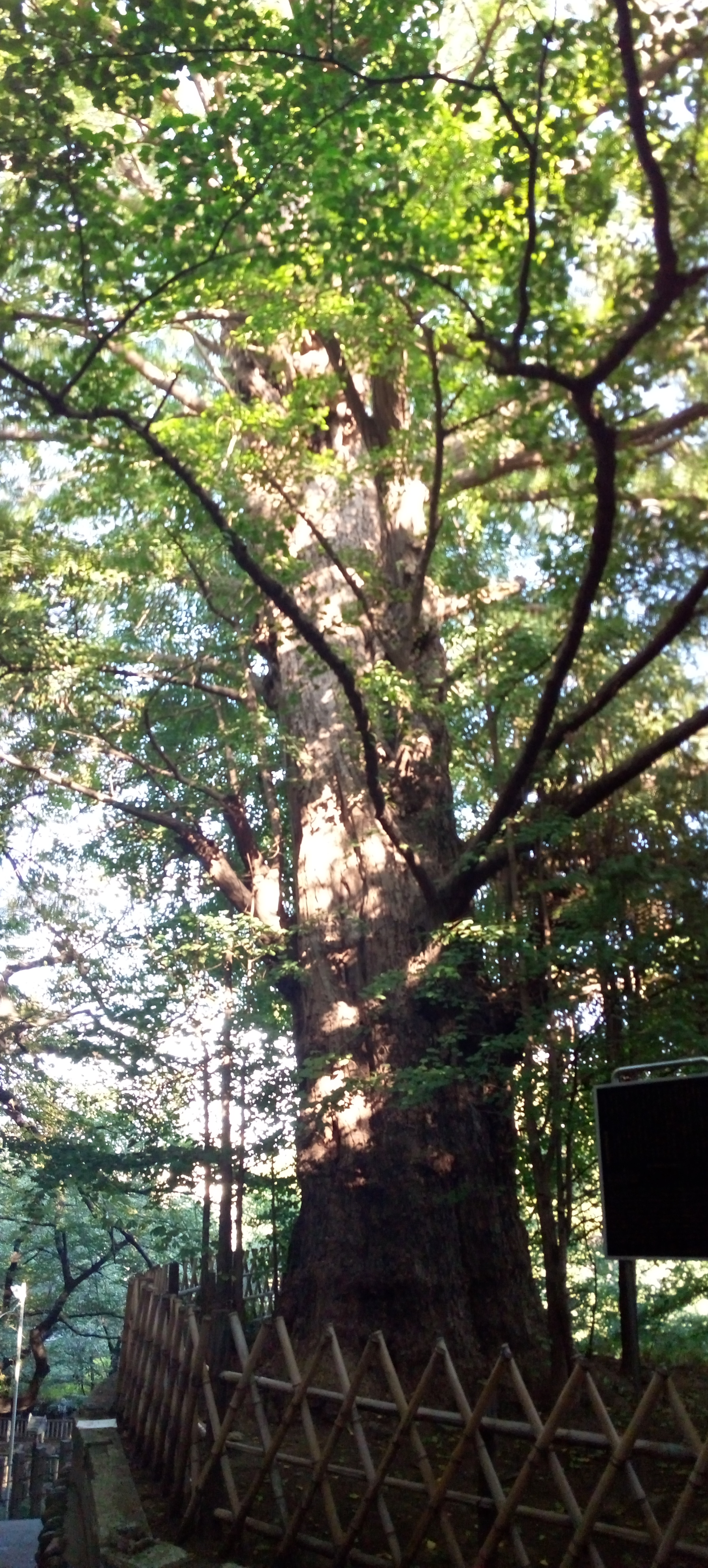
The giant ginkgo tree

=== Torii and Chōzuya ===
The shrine entrance is marked by a big concrete torii (鳥居; literally bird abode) in the myōjin style, very common in Shinto architecture, characterized by curved upper lintels.

A short sandō (参道; visiting path) leads from the torii to the honden. On its right side stand a chōzuya (手水舎), the traditional water ablution pavilion used by worshippers to purify themselves before approaching the shrine.

There is a back access to the shrine through a long stairway from the Otonashi Shinsui Park. This is where the giant ginkgo tree stands.

=== Honden ===
The main building of Ōji shrine is a honden (本殿, main hall) in the Ishi-no-ma-zukuri style, a complex Shinto shrine structure in which the haiden, or worship hall, the heiden, or offertory hall, and the honden, are all interconnected under the same roof in the shape of an H.

The kami worshipped here are Izanami-no-Mikoto and Amaterasu-ōmikami, considered to be "especially benevolent regarding marriage ceremonies, marital harmony, and restoring luck".

=== Seki Shrine ===
At the left of the sandō stands a subsidiary shrine called Seki shrine. This small shrine has been described as "rare even within Japan since it is dedicated to an ancestral deity in charge of hair."

=== Ginkgo tree ===
The ginkgo biloba or ginkgo tree stands on a hill of the left bank of the Otonashi river, just beside the shrine precincts, at the right side of the sandō. It has a height of 24.2 m and a trunk circumference of 5.2 m. It is suspected to have been planted during the construction of the shrine, which would make it more than 600 years old.

Unlike most of the Ōji shrine, the ginkgo tree survived the bombing of Tokyo during World War II, although the top part of the trunk was damaged.

One of the main attractions of the shrine, it was designated a Natural Monument in 1939.

Another giant ginkgo tree of similar characteristics in Tokyo is located in the grounds of Shiba Tōshō-gū.

== Annual Events ==
The annual festival of Ōji Shrine is held the first Sunday of August. It features a mikoshi parade, and the performance of the Ōji Jinja Dengakumai dance, one of Japan's three great dengaku dances.

== Access ==
There is no admission fee for visitors to enter the shrine precincts, and there is parking space available.

The entrances is at a 3-minute walk from the north exit of Ōji Station on the Keihin-Tōhoku Line, or from exit 3 of the same station on the Tokyo Metro Namboku Line, at a 5-minute walk from Ōji-ekimae Station and a 7-minute walk from Asukayama Station on the Toden Arakawa Line.
