= Shōnen Sekai =

Japanese literature magazine

- A black and white issue of Shōnen Sekai, volume 2, issue 5, from the Meiji era. Old postal stamps are also seen.
- Editor: Sazanami Iwaya
- Categories: Shōnen, fiction, nonfiction, art
- Frequency: Monthly
- Publisher: Sazanami Iwaya
- Founded: 1895
- Final issue: 1914
- Company: Hakubunkan
- Country: Japan
- Based in: Tokyo
- Language: Japanese

Shōnen Sekai (少年世界 (Note: Written in Kyūjitai (traditionally) and read from right to left in its traditional format. The Shinjitai equivalent is written the other way around: 少年世界 and uses the standard "Nen" (年, years) Kanji.); "The Youth's World") is one of the first Japanese shōnen magazines. It was published by Hakubunkan from 1895 to 1914 and specializing in children's literature. Shōnen Sekai was created as a part of many magazine created by Hakubunkan that would connect with many different parts of society in Japan. Sazanami Iwaya created the Shōnen Sekai magazine after he wrote Koganemaru a modern piece of children's literature. After Japan had a war with Russia, a female adaptation of Shōnen Sekai was created named Shōjo Sekai. Also some children's books were translated to Japanese and published in Shōnen Sekai. The magazine had many features too, such as sugoroku boards and baseball cards. Shōnen Sekai was mentioned in many American books but no series were actually translated.

== History ==
Japanese publisher Hakubunkan was aiming to create a large variety of magazines that would appeal to many different parts of society: Taiyō, Bungei Club, and Shōnen Sekai were the magazines created and all debuted in 1895 (the Meiji era). On the cover of the first issue of Shōnen Sekai it pictured both Crown Prince Munehito, and the other Empress Jingū who was conquering Sankan (three ancient kingdoms of Korea). Inside of the issue were stories about these matters and Toyotomi Hideyoshi's raid on Korea in 1590. The pioneer of modern Japanese children's media Sazanami Iwaya wrote the first modern children's story Koganemaru in 1891 and also started Shōnen Sekai in 1895. Shunrō Oshikawa invented the "adventure novel" genre, with his works being published many times in both Shōnen Sekai and Shōnen Club and compiled into tankōbon format. In the middle of the Sino-Japanese War Shōnen Sekai featured many stories based on war, or acts of bravery upon war. After the Sino-Japanese War, Shōjo Sekai was created as a sister magazine geared towards the female audience. Even before Shōnen Sekai debuted, Hakubunkan created special magazine issue that would focus on the Sino-Japanese War.

== Features ==
The Shōnen Sekai magazine had many add-ins such as sugoroku boards. The sugoroku Shōnen Sekai Kyōso Sugoroku was originally produced as a supplement to the Shōnen Sekai magazine and is currently seen at the Tsukiji Sugoroku Museum in Japan. Also packs of baseball cards were featured in the magazine in a February 1915 issue of Shōnen Sekai. Players that were included into the pack were Fumio Fujimura, Makoto Kozuru, Shigeru Chiba and Hideo Fujimoto. Many works of children's literature were featured in Shōnen Sekai. An example of this was Iwaya Sazanami (the creator of Shōnen Sekai)'s Shin Hakken-den which had the concept of rewarding the good and punishing the evil a common theme to children's fiction in the 20th century. Shin Hakken-den was based on Nansō Satomi Hakkenden from the Edo period by Takizawa Bakin. Shōnen Sekai carried many stories based on war, and acts of bravery upon war written by Hyōtayu Shimanuki [Hyōdayu -]. In Shōnen Sekai some titles were also translated from other languages, for example: Deux ans de vacances (a novel by Jules Verne) was translated to Japanese by Morita Shiken under the title Jūgo Shōnen (十五少年) and The Jungle Book was also published in Shōnen Sekai.

== Shōnen Sekai media in the English language ==
Shōnen Sekai was mentioned various times in many English books. In the book The New Japanese Women: Modernity, Media, and Women in Interwar Japan mentioned Shōnen Sekai in the notes to chapter 3 as one of many magazines that Hakubunkan made to relate to different parts of society. Daily Lives of Civilians in Wartime Asia: From the Taiping Rebellion to the Vietnam War also mentioned Shōnen Sekai as a popular magazine of that time, with an additional mention to Shōjo Sekai, its female equivalent. Issei: Japanese Immigrants in Hawaii mentioned Shōnen Sekai as just a publication of Hakubunkan. In the book No Sword to Bury: Japanese Americans in Hawai'i During World War II had mention of Shimanuki Hyotayu who writes about immigration matters in Shōnen Sekai. Shōnen Sekai was also mentioned in both The Similitude of Blossoms: A Critical Biography of Izumi Kyōka (1873–1939), Japanese Novelist and Playwright and Japan's Modern Myths: Ideology in the Late Meiji Period.

The closest thing to an actual series published in English was The Jungle Book which was originally in the English language. The Jungle Book was published in the United States by Macmillan Publishers in 1894 and is currently being published by them in London.

== Reception and legacy ==
Shōnen Sekai was one of the most popular children's magazines of its day. Many other children's magazines of that time had very low circulations and were very short lived. Shōnen Sekai was the first of its kind and ran continuously from 1895 to 1914. "Shōnen sekai educated and entertained at least two generations of Japanese children"

I have not been able to obtain accurate circulation figures but Shōnen sekai's longevity alone, compared with that of most other children's media until the WWI years, suggests its dominance through the mid-1910s. This was certainly the official position of Hakubunkan as can be seen in Tsubotani Yoshiyoro,

— Hakubunkan History,

Modeled on Shōnen Sekai Choe Nam-seon founded a magazine, Shonen, in Korea in 1908.
