= Shiba Park =

Park in Minato, Tokyo, Japan

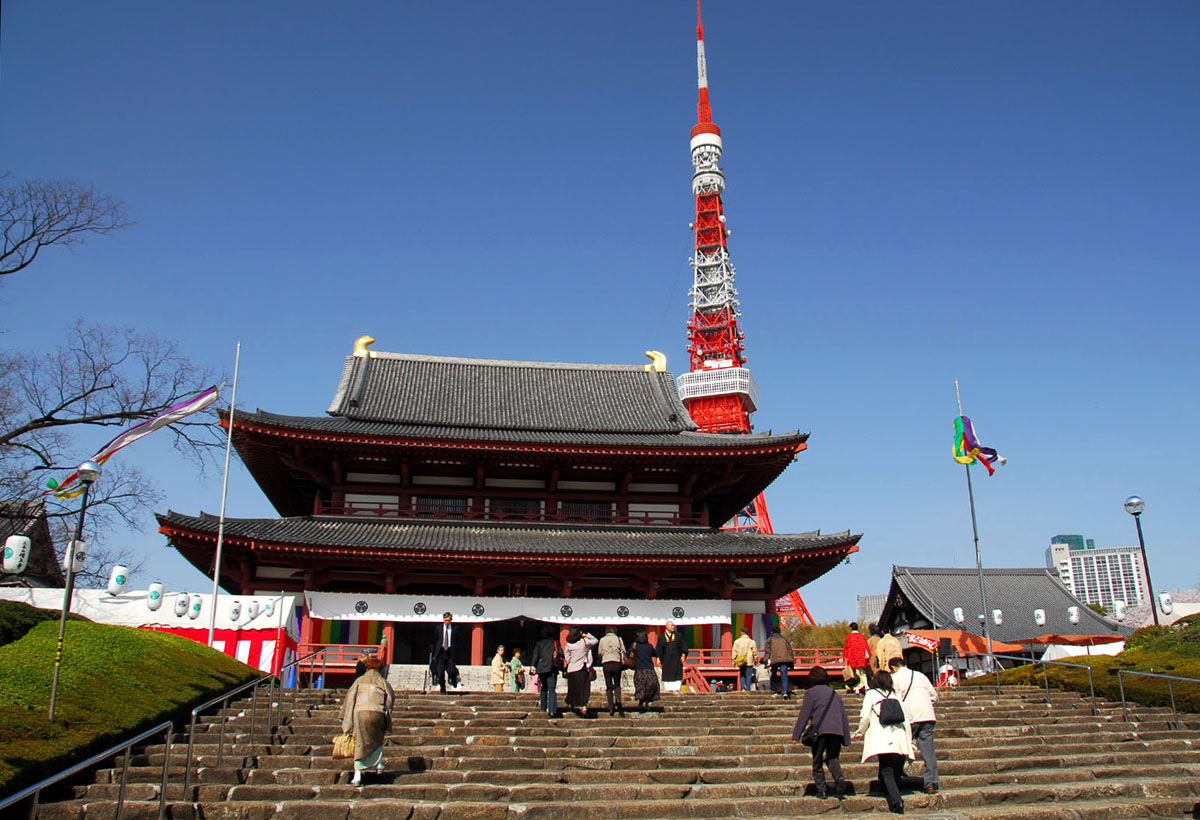
- Zōjō-ji and Tokyo Tower
- Interactive map of Shiba Park
- Location: Minato, Tokyo, Japan
- Coordinates: 35°39′23″N 139°44′54″E
- Area: 122,501.09 square metres (30.27068 acres)
- Created: October 19, 1873

Shiba Park (芝公園, Shiba kōen) is a public park in Minato, Tokyo, Japan built around the temple of Zōjō-ji.

The park is located between the Minato municipal offices and Tokyo Tower. Many of the footpaths in the park offer excellent views of Tokyo Tower, so the park is a popular spot for dates and appears in many television and film sequences. The Central Labor Relations Commission is located here.

Shiba Tōshō-gū shrine, an example of Tōshō-gū architecture, is also located in the park. A giant ginkgo tree, designated Natural Monument and believed to have been planted there by Iemitsu Tokugawa, can be found in the grounds of the shrine.

Thomas Glover had his Tokyo residence here.

Some of the parkland was once the Ōkubo clan residence in Edo.

Shiba Palace Garden (Shiba Onshi-koen), the grounds of the former Shiba Detached Palace, has become the property of the Municipality and is open to the public. The Arisugawa gardens were purchased by the Imperial Household Agency in 1875. The land has since been donated for public use and enjoyment.

A tree that United States President Ulysses S. Grant planted at the park is still growing there today.

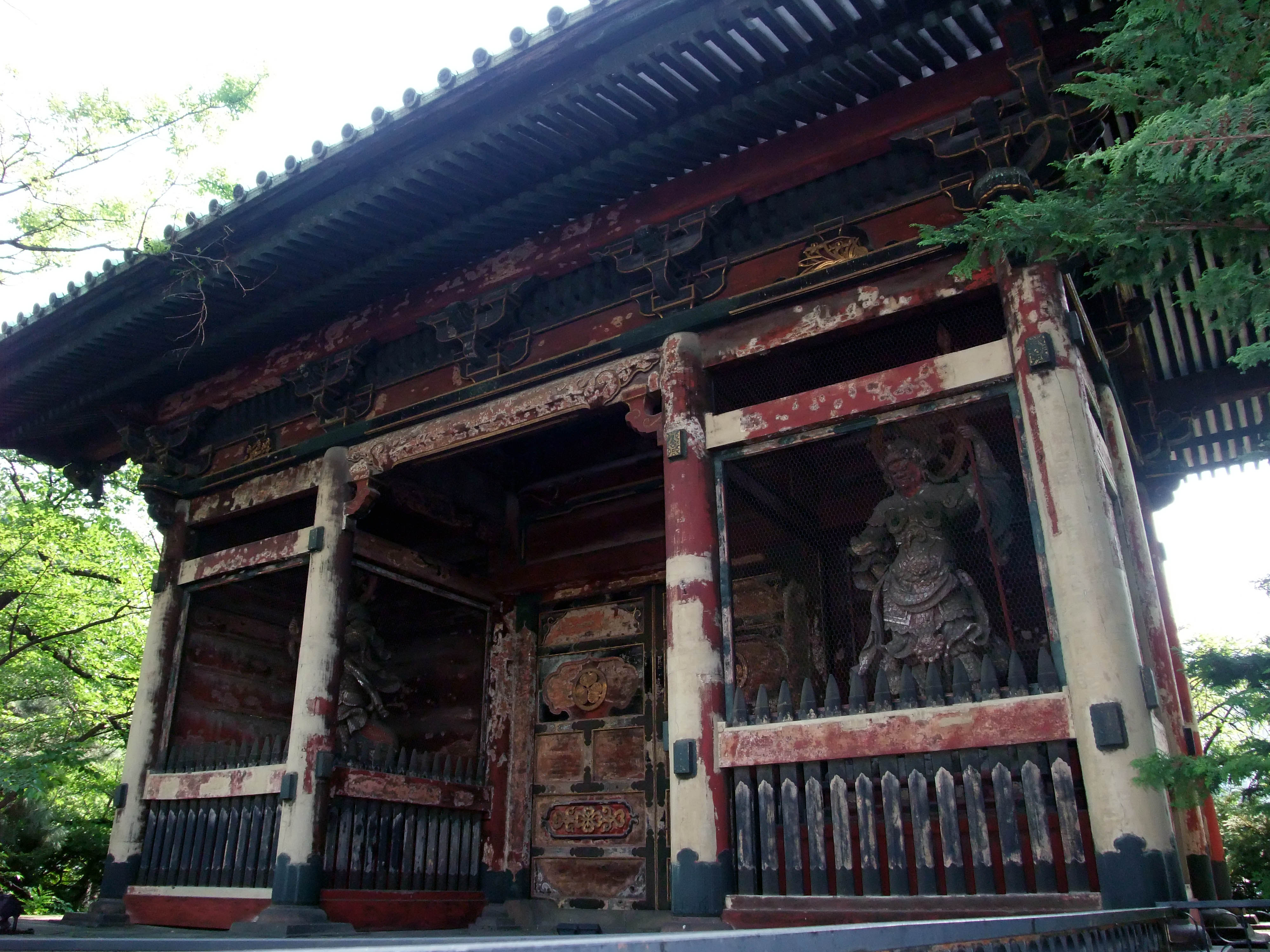

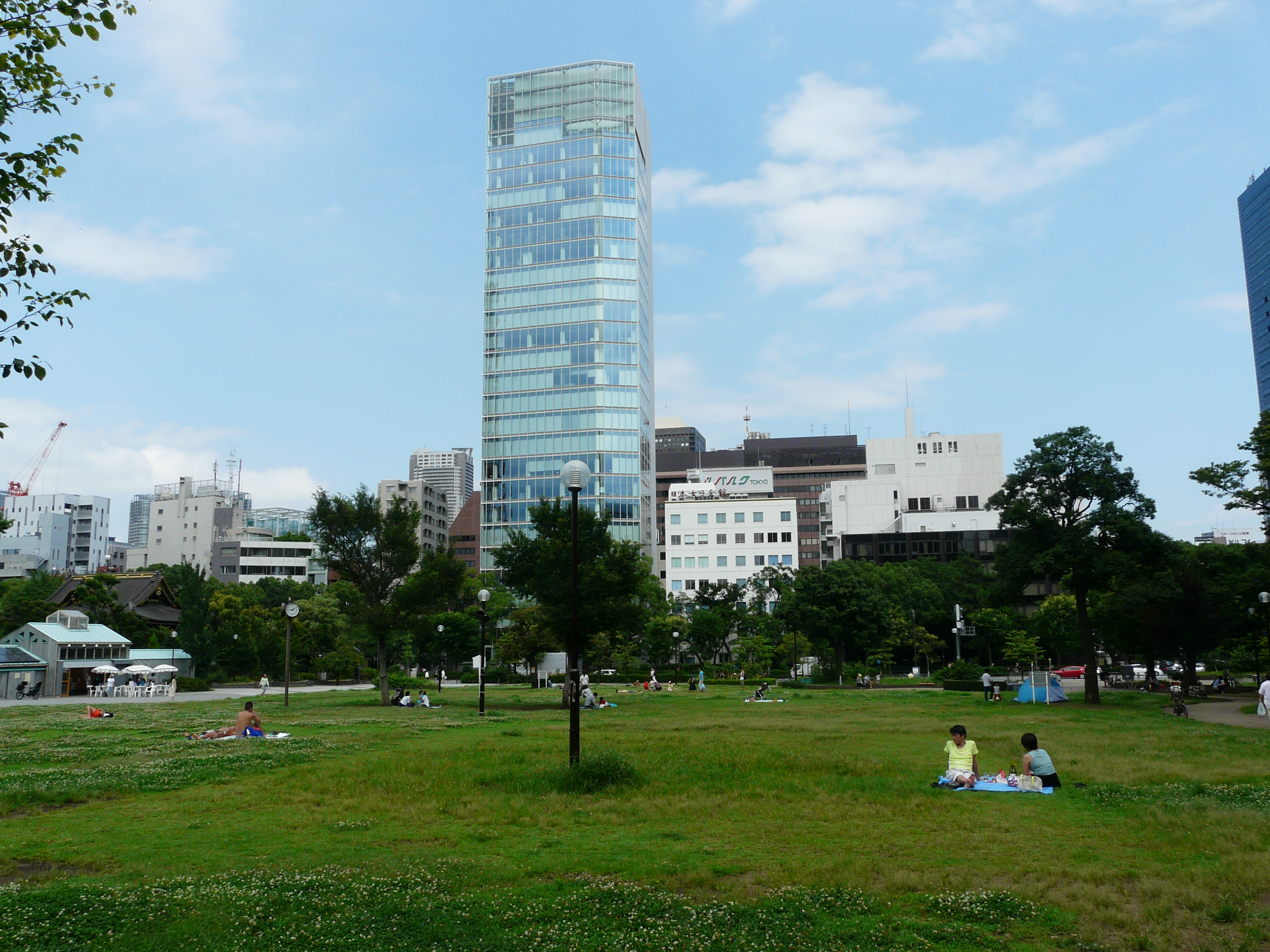

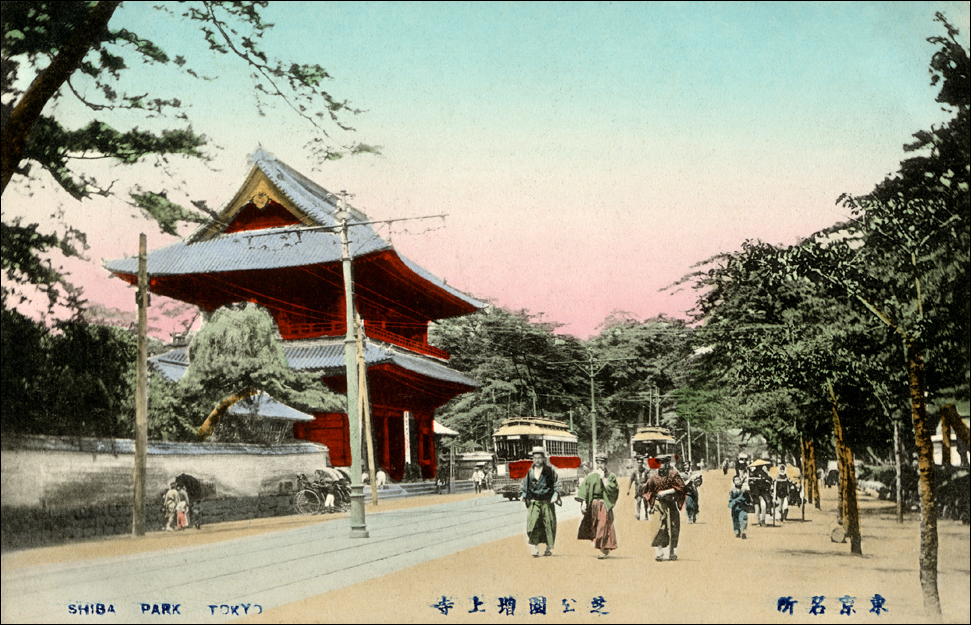
1920

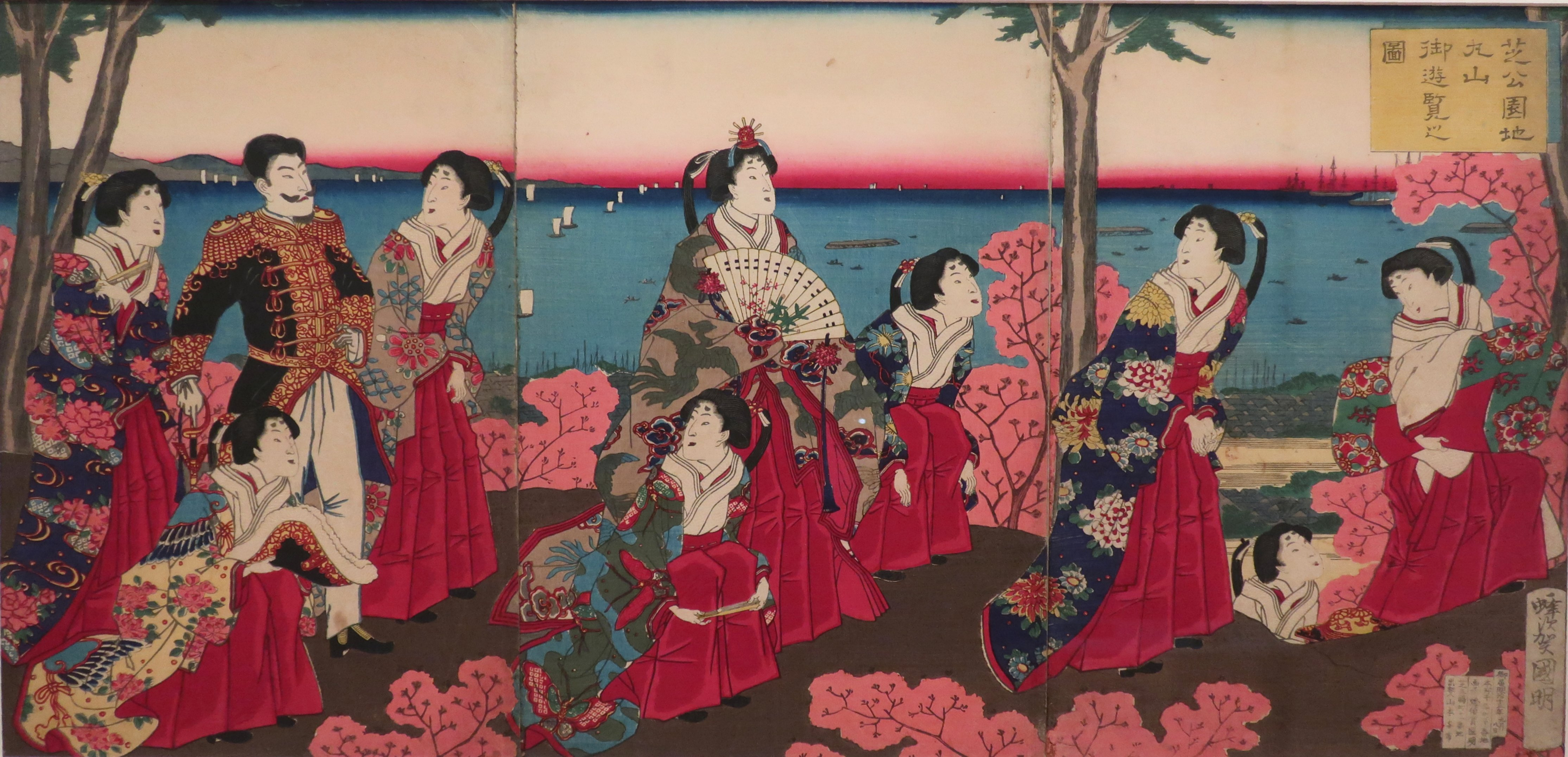
Utagawa Kuniaki II

== Education ==
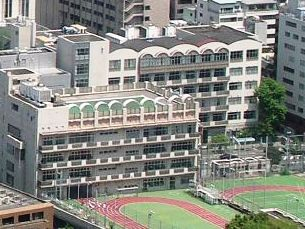
Onarimon Elementary School (御成門小学校) and Onarimon Junior High School (御成門中学校) - the former is in Shibakoen

Minato City Board of Education operates public elementary and junior high schools.

Shibakoen 1-3-chōme and 7-10-ban of 4-chōme are zoned to Onarimon Elementary School (御成門小学校) and Onarimon Junior High School (御成門中学校). Shibakoen 1-6-ban of 4-chōme are zoned to Azabu Elementary School (麻布小学校) and Roppongi Junior High School (六本木中学校).

Shiba Junior and Senior High School, a private school, is in Shiba Park.

Minato City Library operates Minato Library in Shibakoen.

== See also ==
- Arisugawa-no-miya Memorial Park
