= Kuwabara kuwabara =

Japanese phrase used to ward off lightning

"Kuwabara kuwabara" (桑原桑原) is a phrase used in the Japanese language to ward off lightning. It is analogous to the English phrase "knock on wood" to prevent bad luck or "rain, rain go away".

The word kuwabara literally means "mulberry field". According to one explanation, there is a Chinese legend that mulberry trees are not struck by lightning. In contrast, journalist Moku Jōya asserts that the "origin of kuwabara is not definitely known, but it has nothing to do with mulberry plants, though it means 'mulberry fields'."

== In folklore ==
In the 9th century, there was a Japanese aristocrat called Sugawara no Michizane. Sugawara Michizane, who died bearing a heavy grudge after being trapped and exiled to Kyushu, threw his fierce anger in the form of his thunderbolts as a god of lightning. In 930, Seiryoden of the court was struck by a large thunderbolt. The master of onmyo said that this misfortune was the work of the vengeful spirit of Michizane. Those who trapped Michizane trembled with fear and tried to placate the curse by dedicating a prayer to his vengeful ghost, thus leading to the construction of Kitano Shrine.

The land that Michizane owned was known as Kuwabara, so people thought it would be a good idea to claim the land he/she was standing on was a part of Kuwabara, so that Michizane would be hesitant to strike his own people. People of such an era chanted "Kuwabara, Kuwabara" when they heard the rumble of thunder as a method of reminding Michizane not to strike them. This saying often appears in the literature of the Heian period, with elements such as "Tsureduregusa", a spell to cast away thunder. The very people living in Kuwabara at that time relied on the Kuwabara spell and the land of Kuwabara is said to have remained unharmed by lightning for that reason.
