= Japan Agricultural Cooperatives =

Regional co-ops in Japan

Japan Agricultural Cooperatives (農業協同組合, Nōgyō Kyōdō Kumiai), also known as Nōkyō (農協) or JA Group, refers to the national group of 694 regional co-ops in Japan that supply members with input for production, undertake packaging, transportation, and marketing of agricultural products, and provide financial services. As of 2012, there are 4.6 million official members and 5.4 million associate members in JA. While "JA" refers to co-ops that operate in respective municipalities, the "JA Group" includes administrative bodies that supervise regional co-ops across several prefectures, run wholesale business in food products and production inputs across municipal and prefectural borders (Zen-Noh), manage credit unions (Norinchukin Bank), offer insurance (JA Kyosai), and a national headquarters that controls the entire group and manages government relations (JA Zenchu). "JA" and "JA Group" are often used interchangeably (as will be hereafter).

== Origin as a regulatory organization ==
The origin of the Japan Agricultural Cooperatives system can be traced back to the Nogyokai, a government-controlled association of farmers and landowners, which worked under government orders to collect, store, and redistribute agricultural products in respective regions during the Second World War. Nogyokai was transformed into the JA in the wake of Japan's surrender and amidst severe food shortage to prevent rice from being sold on the black market at high prices (rice could not be bought and sold freely at the time). While JA takes the form of a voluntary grassroots farmers' organization, it is distinct from other co-ops in the rest of the world in that JA was founded by the government as a regulatory tool, covers all farmers in the entire country, and performs almost all economic aspects of the Japanese agricultural industry.

=== Businesses ===
The members of JA determine which services the cooperative will provide; these are quite comprehensive and cover nearly aspect of a farmer's existence. With nearly unlimited funds made up of member deposits, JA Group's endeavors aim to promote development in the regions where they are active. Unlike most cooperatives in Japan, JA Group has another advantage in being permitted to engage in credit and financial business. With JA Group providing sizable and stable demand for products, many manufacturers have produced specific products that are offered only to JA members, like the Subaru Sambar JA kei truck. The cooperative provides advisory services for farming as well as more general advisory roles.

Direct farm business

- Sales of cooperative members' products
- managing farmers' markets
- supplying daily necessities such as fertilizers and pesticides
- selling agricultural machinery
- JA also sells foodstuffs directly to farmers.
- Operation of grain elevators, rice processing centers, etcetera.

Secondary businesses

- JA operates a chain of gas stations (JA-SS, Hokuren SS) and propane gas suppliers (Kumiai Propane).
- Supermarket (A Corp) chain
- Direct to home medicine sales (Kumiai home medicine)
- Credit business (JA Bank)
- Insurance Business (JA Mutual Aid)

Comprehensive life insurance (medical insurance, term life insurance, children's insurance, pension insurance, long-term care insurance, etc.), building rehabilitation insurance, fire insurance, automobile insurance, compulsory automobile liability insurance, etcetera.

Welfare business

- JA Group directly operates hospitals, clinics, health facilities, etcetera.
- Elder care business

Other business

- JA Group also includes ceremonial businesses such as funerals (JA funerals)
- tourism and travel business
- real estate brokerage business
- newspaper (Nihon Agricultural Newspaper) and publishing business
- post office services
- sales and maintenance of agricultural machinery
- automobile dealers and driving schools
- architectural design
- cable broadcasting
- power generation

== Change into a powerful farm lobby ==
Although JA was founded by the government, it soon proved difficult to control as the entity grew into a powerful farm lobby. Before 1995, the price of rice was determined by the government under the staple food control system. Demand for staple foods like rice is inelastic, which means that, at least in the short term, higher prices translate into increased net sales and thus higher commissions for JA as the sole wholesaler of agricultural products. Rice prices were set on the basis of production costs incurred by farmers, so as the sole wholesaler of input supplies like fertilizer, pesticides, and machinery, JA inflated the prices of these supplies, the margin of which would eventually reflect in higher rice retail prices. JA's business model was hinged upon its monopoly or quasi-monopoly in both ends of the supply chain (agricultural inputs such as fertilizer, pesticides, machinery, and end-products such as rice, wheat, and barley) and its political clout over Japan's Diet members to influence the set food prices.

== Vulnerabilities and countermeasures ==
There are several vulnerabilities to JA's business model. First, the very existence of the agricultural cooperative is based on a law called the Agricultural Cooperative Association Law, which can be rewritten or repealed by the Ministry of Agriculture, Forestry and Fisheries (MAFF). While this law justifies various privileges that JA enjoys including exemption from Japan's antitrust law, it does remain outside of JA's direct control. Secondly, highly priced rice produced by Japanese farmers will easily lose market share should cheaper rice be imported from overseas. JA's business is dependent on high import tariffs on foreign rice controlled by the government. The current import tariff on foreign rice is 778%. The third vulnerability is the decline in Japan's farming population. Agricultural production declined from 11.7 trillion yen in 1984 to 8.2 trillion in 2011, and the number of farming households plummeted from over 6 million representing 14.5 million people in 1960 to 2.5 million households in 2010 representing a working force nearly one sixth the size 50 years ago.

To maintain the founding act and the trade barriers intact, JA makes full use of its political leverage over Diet members, especially members of the Liberal Democratic Party (LDP) who are from electorates with a large farming population. JA has a government affairs arm (JA Zenchu) as well as a political committee (Noseiren), and the latter especially has historically contributed to organizing farmer votes in support of LDP candidates. As a political party that has kept its majority in the Lower House for almost entirely since its formation in 1955, LDP has long protected JA by keeping MAFF and other government agencies in check.

The fact that Japan's farming population is in decline poses the greatest threat to JA's continued dominance in the agricultural market and the group's very existence. With less demand for agricultural inputs, JA's wholesale business incurs more operating cost relative to sales. In fact, JA's wholesale business has shown negative net profit in recent years. The loss is covered by surplus from JA's financial services and asset management, supported by increased funding from its newly created "associate" membership that allows non-farmers to receive its credit and insurance services. JA has paid effort in nurturing new generations in the farming industry to raise productivity, but has proved unsuccessful. This is because the organization has simultaneously supported unproductive farmers who only work part-time in small-sized farmlands, rather than promoting corporate farming and merger of farmland to reduce cost and raise productivity. Today (as of 2005), 62% of Japanese "farmers" work part-time and rely primarily on non-farming jobs. 16% rely primarily on farming but are still part-time, and only 23% are full-time farmers. The overwhelming majority of those full-time farmers are people who retired from their second job and returned to their farmlands. In aggregate, only 9.5% of the total farming population is full-time male farmers less than 65 years of age. JA's rationale to perpetuate this structure is political. A group of 100 unproductive farmers translates into more votes in Diet elections, and thus serves JA's interests better than a group of 10 productive farmers.

== Reform ==
Recently, there have been signs of change. Prime Minister Shinzō Abe's regulatory reform committee made an official proposal in November 2014 to undertake several reforms including removing power from JA Zenchu to audit and supervise local JA co-ops and convert Zen-Noh into a joint stock corporation. In July 2015, Akira Banzai, former president of Zenchu, was replaced by pro-reform Choe Okuno after an election that was widely believed to favor Toru Nakaya, a conservative who had support from many high-ranked JA officials. In October 2015, Japan concluded its TPP negotiations with 11 other member countries and made an important move towards reducing trade barriers to foreign agricultural products.

== Literature ==
- Freiner, Nicole L. (2018-09-20). "Japan Agriculture (JA): The Role of the Agricultural Cooperative". Rice and Agricultural Policies in Japan. Cham: Springer International Publishing. pp. 81–105. doi:10.1007/978-3-319-91430-5_4. ISBN 978-3-319-91429-9.
