= Dai-ichi Life Hibiya First =

Historic office building in Tokyo, Japan

Coordinates: 35°40′33″N 139°45′39″E

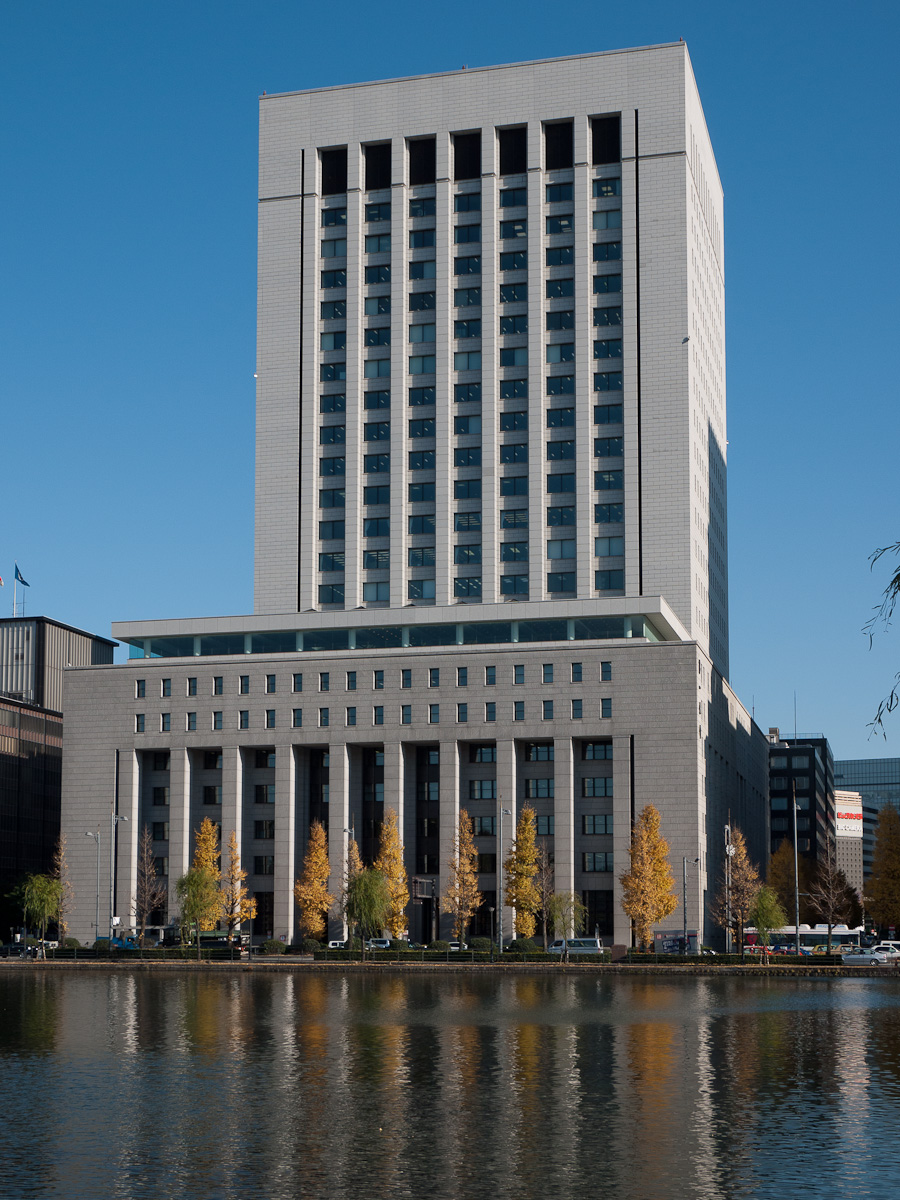
The tower overlooks the moat around the Imperial Palace.

Dai-ichi Life Hibiya First, known from 1995 to 2022 as DN Tower 21 (for Dai-ichi and Norinchukin), is an office high-rise in Yūrakuchō, Tokyo, Japan. It was erected in 1988–1995 on the site of the respective former head office buildings of Dai-ichi Life and Norinchukin Bank, both designed by architect Jin Watanabe and completed in 1938 and 1933 respectively.

The site is historically significant for having hosted Douglas MacArthur and his staff as Supreme Commander for the Allied Powers (SCAP) during the occupation of Japan following World War II.

Norinchukin Bank left the building in early 2022. The building was consequently rebranded and remains the head office of Dai-Ichi Life.

== Overview ==
The Norinchukin Bank Yurakucho Building was erected in 1931–1933 as head office of Norinchukin Bank on the eastern half of the block. It was designed by Jin Watanabe, in the neoclassical style that was common at the time and also adopted by other major banks such as Mitsubishi in 1922, Mitsui in 1929, and Dai-Ichi Bank in 1931, among others. The contractor was Shimizu Corporation.

The Dai-Ichi Seimei Building was then erected on the western part of the same block, whose land plots the insurance company had purchased in 1931. The site, on a prominent location facing the Imperial Palace, had earlier hosted a post office, a rental hall, a kendo hall, and a temporary Metropolitan Police Department. Watanabe was selected as architect in 1933 and originally also proposed a neoclassical design with Western-style columns, but revised his concept multiple times and evolved it towards Stripped Classicism. The construction phase, also by Shimizu, extended from 1934 to 1938.

During World War II, the Dai-Ichi Life building was commandeered by Japan's Eastern District Army as its headquarters. Then in 1945 the two properties, which had withstood the bombing of Tokyo and offered a symbolically prominent position overseeing the palace grounds, were chosen by McArthur for his own general headquarters (GHQ-SCAP). The Far East Command kept using the premises after the dissolution of GHQ-SCAP in April 1952 following the Treaty of San Francisco. It eventually turned them back to the respective owners, first to Dai-Ichi Life in July 1952 then to Norinchukin Bank in February 1956.

Construction of DN Tower 21, on a design by Roche-Dinkeloo architects, started in 1988 and entailed the near-complete demolition in 1989 of the two earlier buildings, with the exception of some of the Dai-Ichi Life Building's exterior façades and rooms on the sixth floor that were preserved for their SCAP legacy, including the so-called MacArthur Memorial Room. Some stonework of the Norinchukin façade, including its distinctive Ionic columns, was reassembled on the eastern side albeit on a slightly different design from the original. The project represented the first-ever application of a Special Planning Permission for historic building conservation in Japan.

The 21-story building, like its two predecessors, was erected by Shimizu Corporation as general contractor. It topped out in 1993, at 99.8 metres. The Government of Tokyo designated the complex as a historical building in 2004.

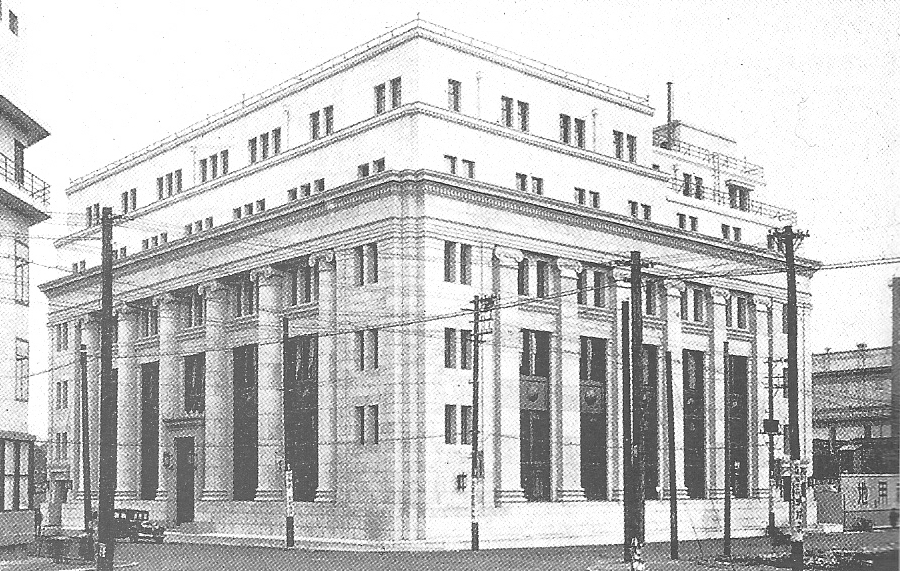
Norinchukin Bank building, photographed in the 1930s

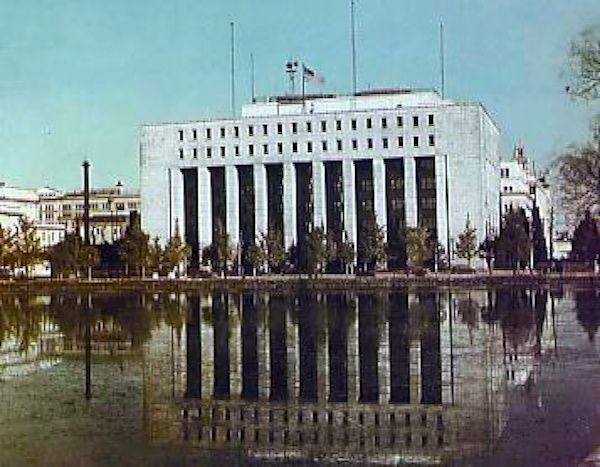
Dai-Ichi Seimei building, photographed ca. 1950

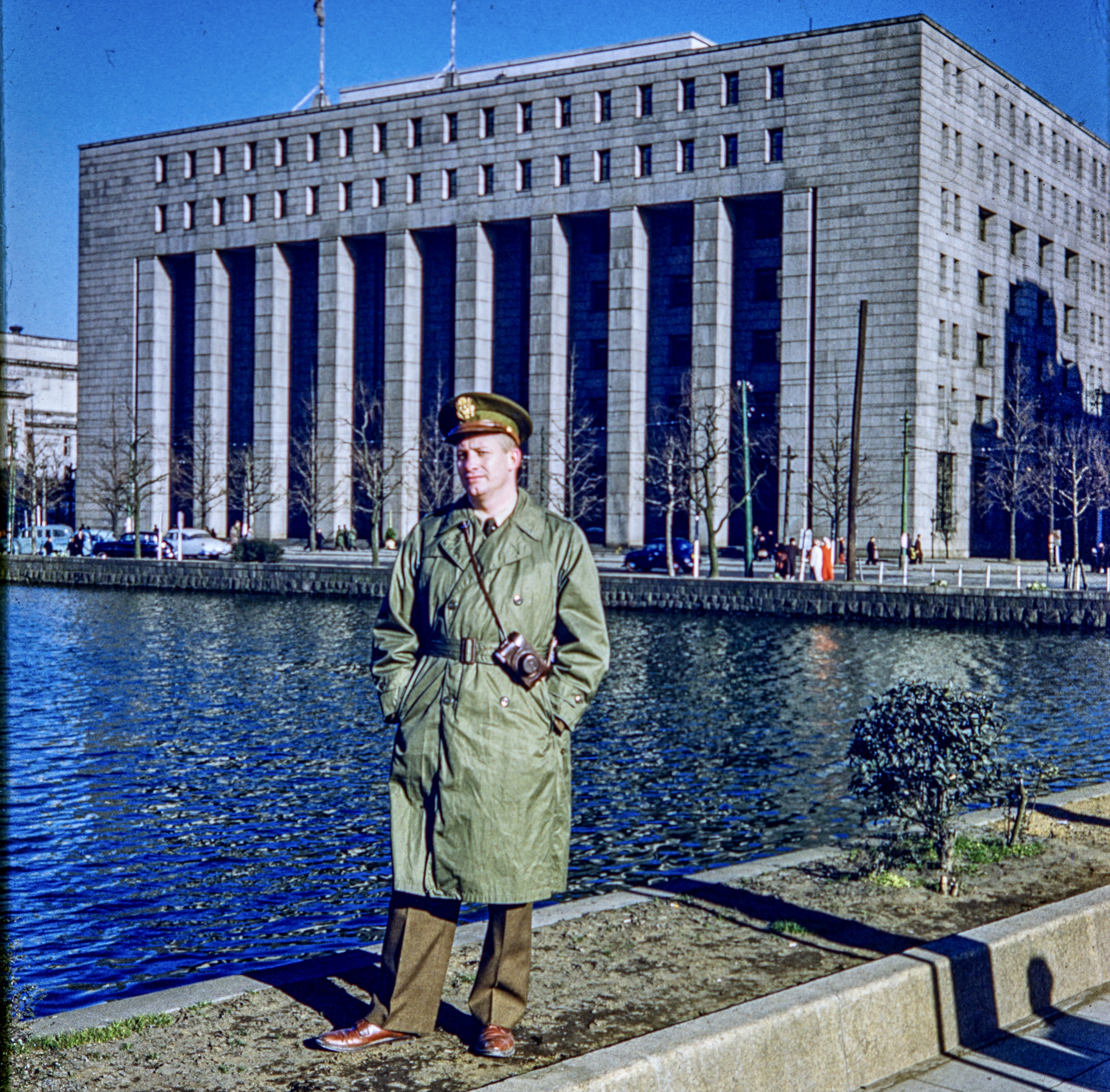
A US serviceman posing in front of the building in 1953

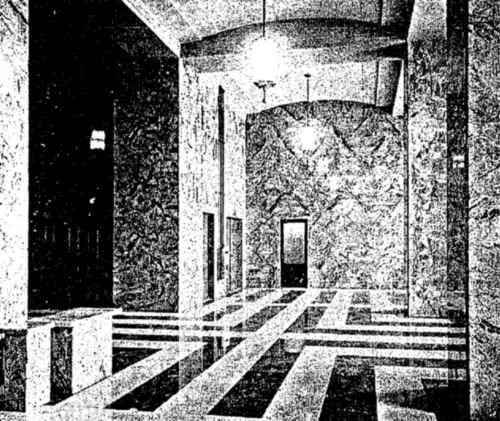
Former entrance lobby (demolished in 1989)

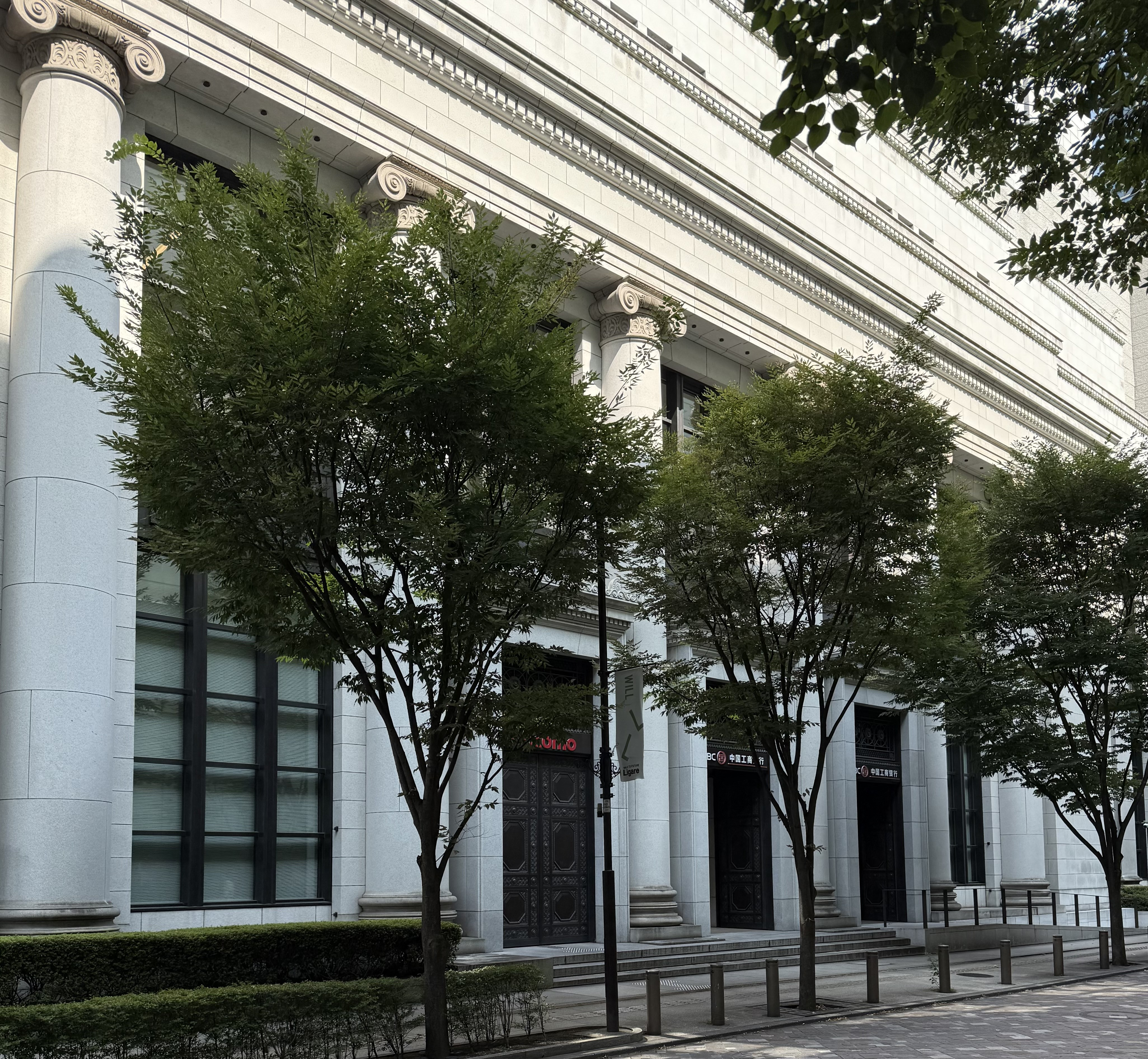
Reassembled former elements of the original Norinchukin Bank building on the rear front

== See also ==
- List of tallest structures in Tokyo
