= Chagurin =

Japanese children's magazine

- December 2004 issue.
- Categories: Children, Manga
- Frequency: Monthly
- Founded: 1964
- Company: Family Light Association
- Country: Japan
- Based in: Tokyo
- Language: Japanese
- Website: Official website

Chagurin (ちゃぐりん) is a children's magazine published by the "Family Light Association" (家の光協会 Ie no Hikari Kyōkai) in Japan. The magazine was formerly published under the title Children's Light (こどもの光, Kodomo no Hikari).

== History and profile ==
The magazine was started under the name Children's Light (こどもの光, Kodomo no Hikari) in 1964. The publication is funded by the Central Union of Agricultural Cooperatives. It is published on a monthly basis.

In August 1993 the title of the magazine was changed into its current name, Chagurin. The goal of the magazine is to educate the next generation of Japan Agricultural Cooperative (or "JA") members. The magazine is difficult to find in the average bookstore in Japan, but it can be purchased at any local JA office. The contents of Chagurin are similar to the educational magazines published by Shogakukan up through the 1960s, and the magazine has been recommended by the National PTA of Japan since 1994.

The magazine has admitted to publishing "some errors in scope and fact" and "exaggeration" in at least one article titled "Children of America, the Poverty Superpower". Like other magazines aimed at children, it includes a variety of manga. However, the manga found in Chagurin tends to be fairly mainstream, non-controversial, and are not generally collected in tankōbon format (Doraemon and Kiteretsu Daihyakka being exceptions).
