= Norinchukin Bank =

Japanese cooperative bank

Norinchukin
- Type: Cooperative bank
- Industry: Financial services
- Founded: 20 December 1923; 102 years ago
- Headquarters: Otemachi One, Tokyo, Japan
- Key people: Yoshio Kono (president and CEO); Mamoru Moteki (chairman)
- Total assets: JPY 83.498 trillion (US$ 545.7 billion)
- Number of employees: 3,229
- Website: nochubank.or.jp

The Norinchukin Bank (農林中央金庫, Nōrin Chūō Kinko; lit. "Central Credit Union for Agriculture and Forestry [Cooperatives]"), also referred to as Nochu Bank, is a Japanese cooperative bank serving over 5,612 agricultural, fishing and forestry cooperatives from its headquarters in Tokyo.

Nochu is one of Japan's largest institutional investors, with an investment portfolio of more than US$400 billion and assets exceeding US$840 billion. Through overseas branches located in New York City, London, and Singapore, it invests in bond, securitization products, stock, private equity, and real estate. Its large assets of US$840 billion are managed by only around 3,200 employees, as the bank is mainly engaged in asset management and large scale corporate financing. It has 41 offices throughout Japan and five overseas branches.

Nochu's member cooperatives include federations such as the Japan Agricultural Cooperatives (JA) and the Japan Fishery Cooperatives (JF). Norinchukin supports political lobbying against agricultural imports and the deterioration of living standards in rural areas.

== History ==
The Norinchukin Bank was founded on 20 December 1923 by the Japanese government to support the country's agriculture industry. Norinchukin is derived from the bank's Japanese name Nō - Rin - Chūō - Kinko (Agriculture - forestry - central - credit union). Norinchukin suffered from a lack of investment funds during World War II, due to restrictions by the Japanese government. After the war, Norinchukin played an important role in rebuilding the country. Once the government encouraged divestment in the textile industry, Norinchukin formed a political lobby to support the agriculture sector. In 1979, Norinchukin set up an international department and formed a relationship with the Bank of Japan. Low interest rates in the 1980s impacted Norinchukin's profitability. The Japanese government adjusted the charter of Norinchukin in 1986 and allowed the bank to operate as a commercial bank. Following the global recession in 2008, Norinchukin indicated it had ¥9.7 billion in losses related to the subprime mortgage crisis. For the 2009 fiscal year, Norinchukin posted a net income of ¥29.5 billion. In Nov 26, 2025, Norinchukin Bank is Not Renew with NIPRO (A Social Loan Contract).

For The 2025 Q3/Full Year Of 2025 fiscal Year, NB posted a net income of ¥30-70 billion.

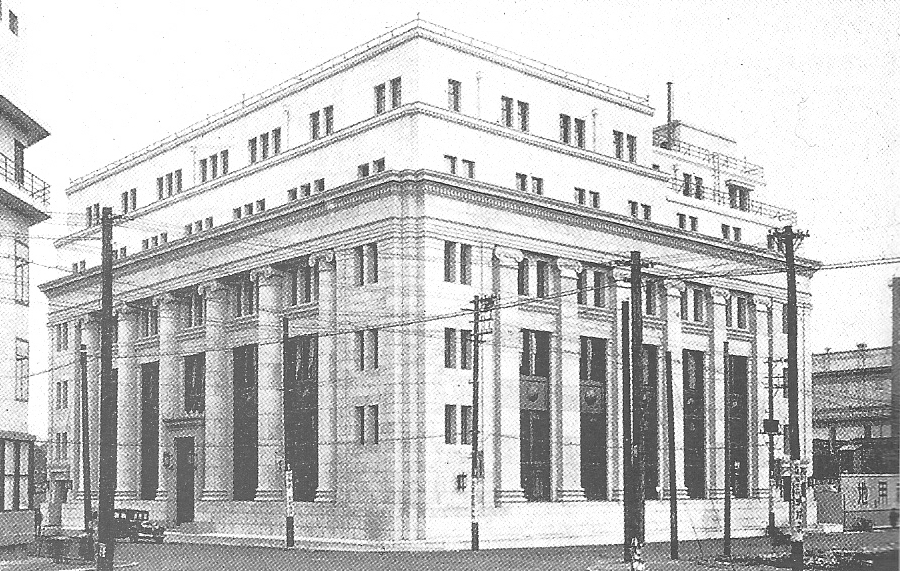
Norinchukin Bank Yurakucho Building in Tokyo, designed by Jin Watanabe and completed in 1933

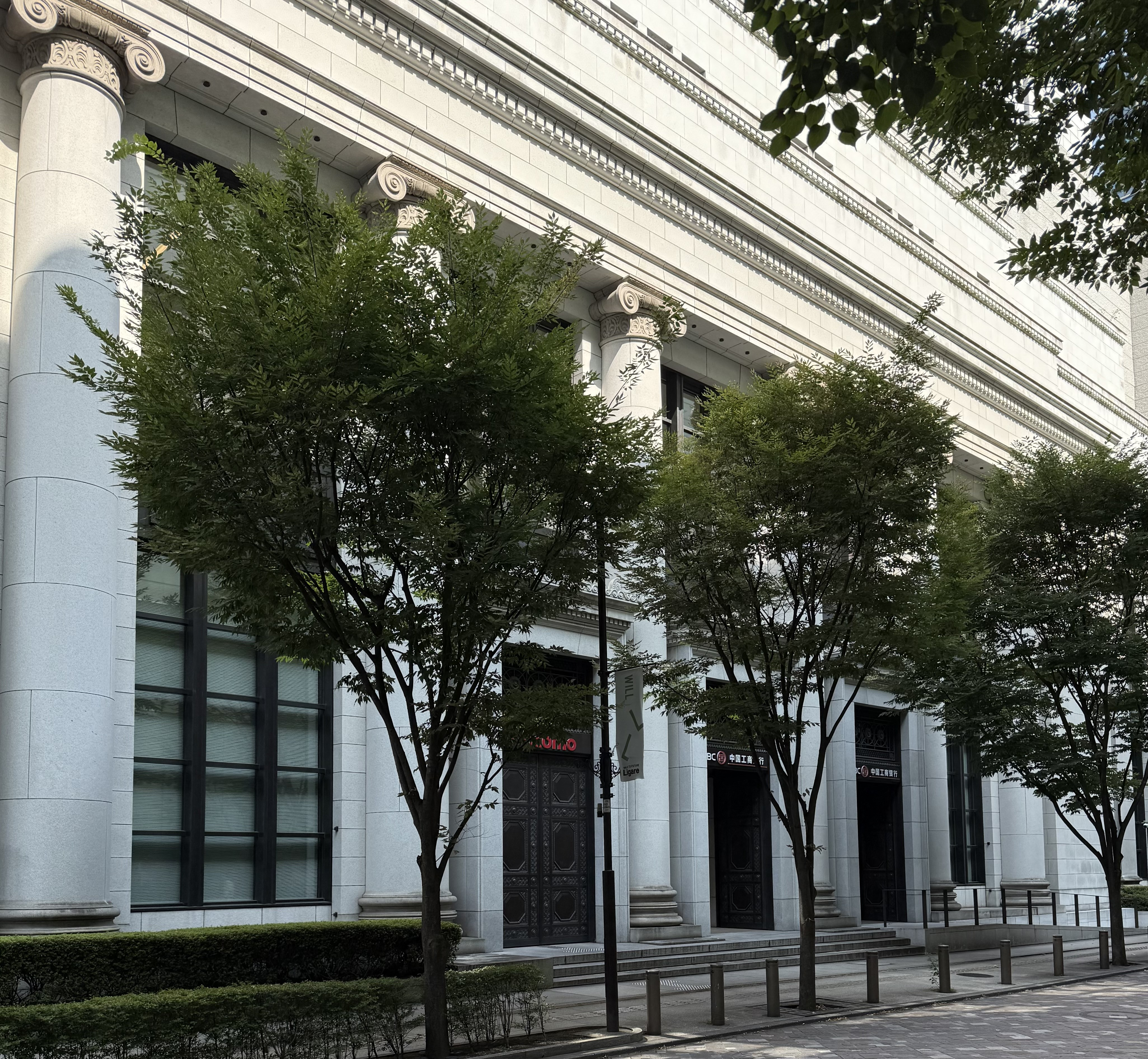
Elements of the same building reassembled in the early 1990s as part of DN Tower 21

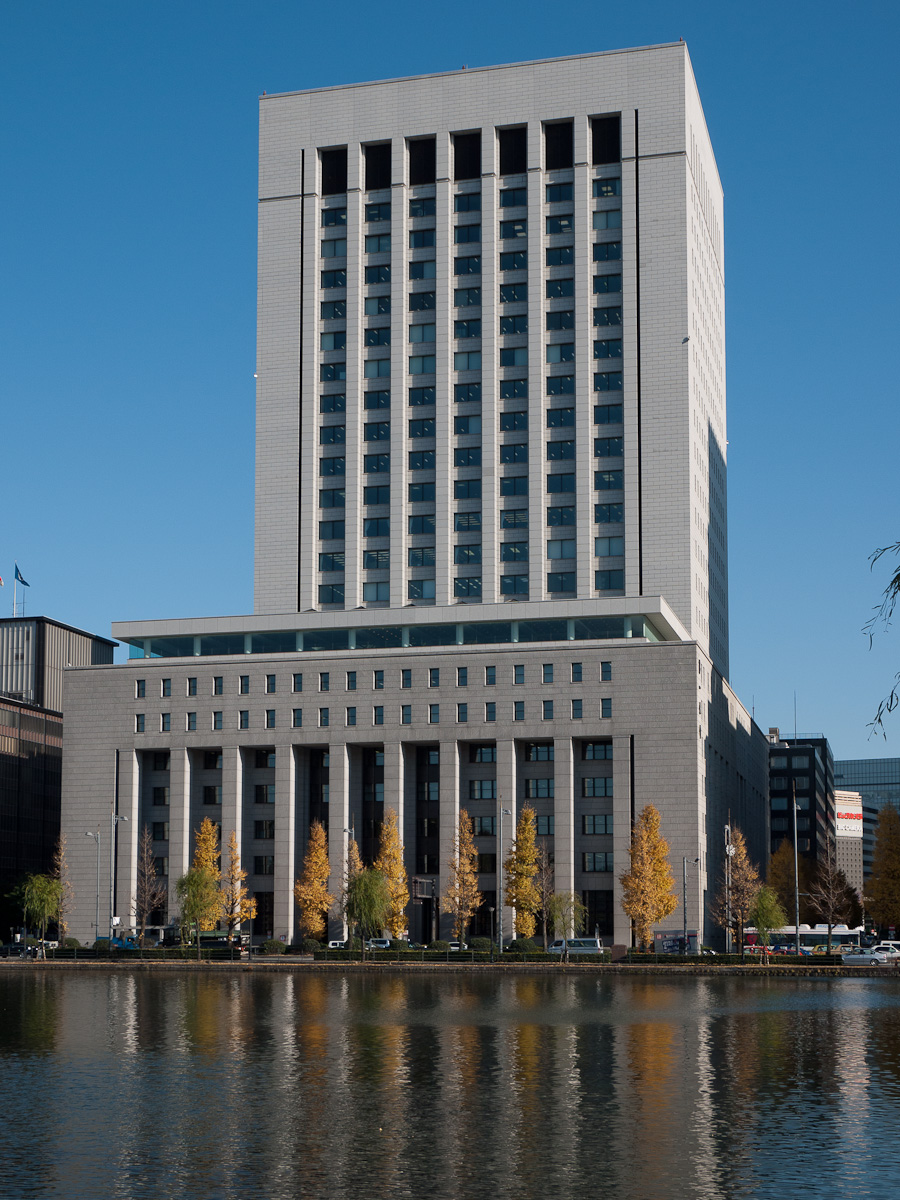
DN Tower 21, Norinchukin Bank head office from the 1990s to 2022

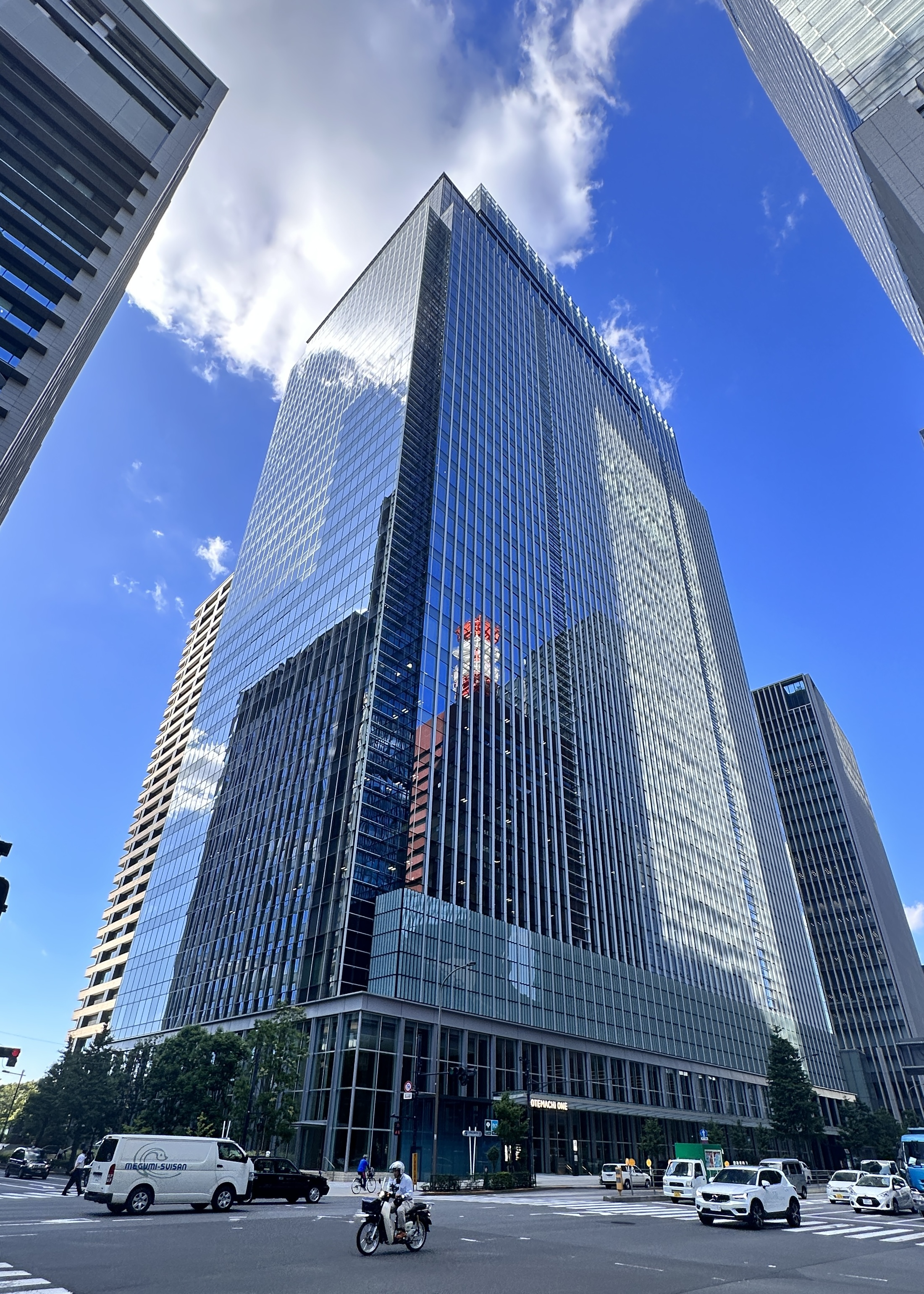
Otemachi One Tower in Ōtemachi, Chiyoda, Tokyo, Norinchukin Bank head office since January 2022

== See also ==
- Crédit Agricole
- Rabobank
