= Daiichi Life =

Japanese life insurance holding company

Daiichi Life Group, Inc.
- Logo used since 2026

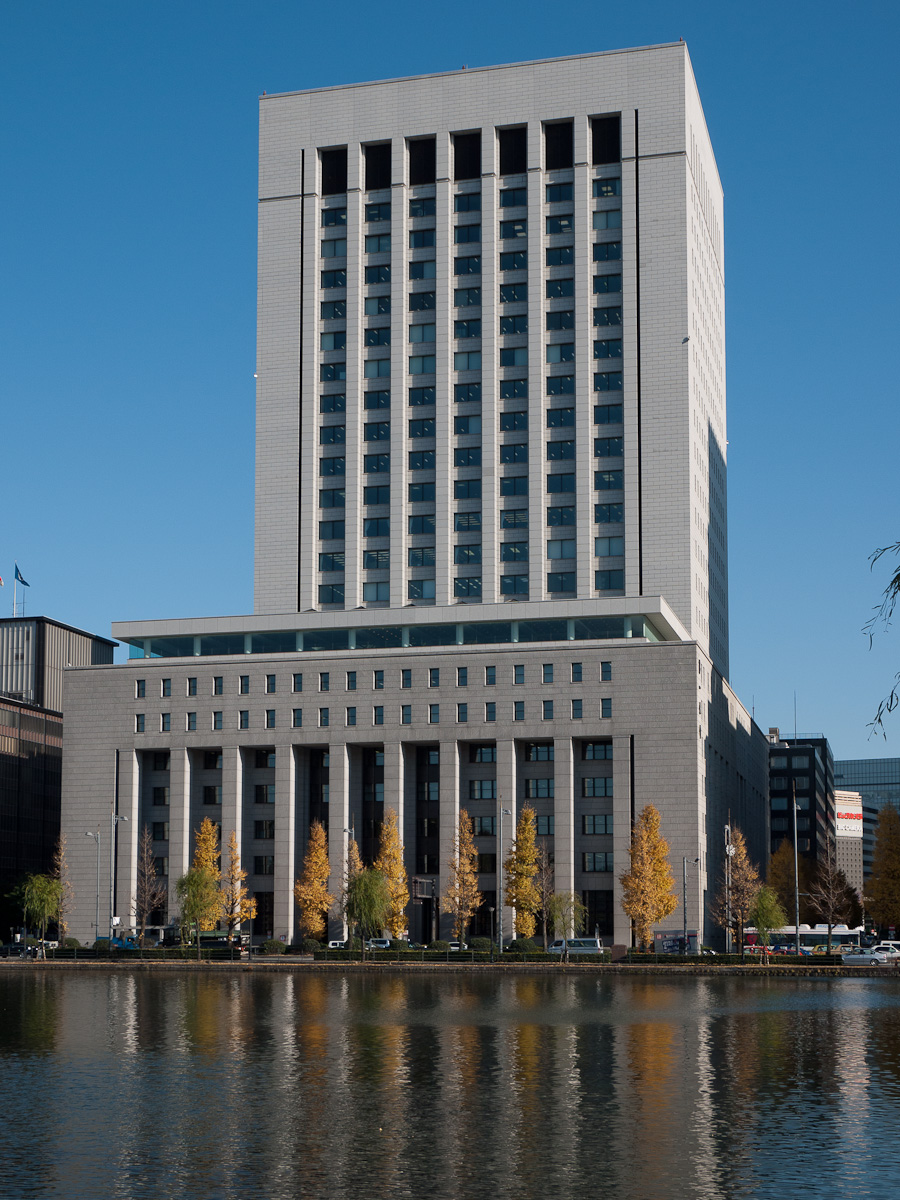
- Headquarters at the Dai-ichi Life Hibiya First
- Native name: 株式会社第一ライフグループ
- Romanized name: Kabushiki-gaisha Daiichi Raifu Gurūpu
- Formerly: The Dai-Ichi Life Insurance Company (1902-2010); The Dai-Ichi Life Insurance Company, Limited (2010-2016); Dai-ichi Life Holdings, Inc. (2016-2026)
- Type: Public
- Traded as: TYO: 8750; TOPIX Large 70 Component (Dai-ichi Life Holdings)
- Founded: September 15, 1902; 124 years ago
- Founder: Tsuneta Yano
- Headquarters: Dai-ichi Life Hibiya First, Yurakucho, Chiyoda, Tokyo, Japan
- Products: Insurance
- Revenue: 5.28 trillion yen (FY 2013)
- Net income: 32.4 billion yen (FY 2013)
- Total assets: $346.9 billion (2015), Solvency ratio: 763.8%
- Total equity: 1.64 trillion yen (March 2013)
- Number of employees: 61,335 (2013)
- Subsidiaries: The Dai-ichi Life Insurance; Dai-Ichi Frontier; Neo-First Life Insurance; iPet; Dai-ichi Small Amount and Short-term
- Website: www.dai-ichi-life-hd.com

Daiichi Life Group, Inc. (株式会社第一ライフグループ, Kabushiki-gaisha Daiichi Raifu Gurūpu), or Daiichi Life for short, is the third-largest life insurer in Japan by revenue, behind Japan Post Insurance and Nippon Life.

Founded on September 15, 1902, Dai-Ichi was one of the oldest mutual insurance companies in Japan until a motion to demutualise was passed in 2009 and, on April 1, 2010, it listed on the Tokyo Stock Exchange, raising 1.01 trillion yen. As of March 2013, it had the most assets of any listed company in Japan with a total of 33 trillion yen on its stand-alone balance sheet, more than twice the total assets of #2-ranked Tokyo Electric Power Company.

It was announced in October 2014 that Dai-ichi would raise US$1 billion by issuing US-dollar-denominated subordinated bonds in overseas markets.

It is also the largest single shareholder of the Tokyu Corporation, holding 6.35% of all issued stock.

== Key facts ==
As of March 30, 2006:

- Total assets - US$276,552 million
- Policy reserves - US$227,524 million
- Total capital - US$21,425 million
- Solvency margin ratio - 1,095.5%
- Policies in force - US$2,085 billion
- Policyholders - 8,646,469

== History ==
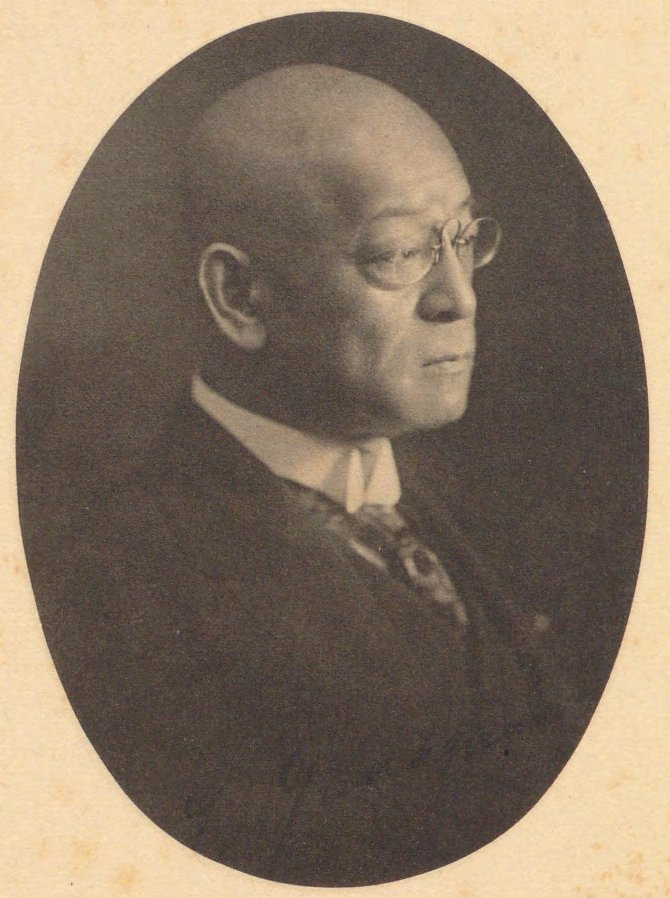
The Earl Yanagisawa Yasutoshi

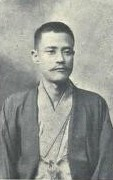
The lieutenant Hamaguchi Kichibe

- 1902 - Founded by a statistician and the Earl Yanagisawa Yasutoshi, Ohashi Shintaro, the President of the Hakubunkan, and the Lieutenant Hamaguchi Kichibe, supported by an insurance doctor Yano Kota.
- 1937 - After Marco Polo Bridge Incident in July which the Major general Masakazu Kawabe and the Colonel Renya Mutaguchi led the Second Sino-Japanese War, Ministry of Commerce and Industry and Ministry of Colonial Affairs issued Manturia Insurance Business Act on December 27 and enforced it the next day. (Note: The govt has originally planned to issue the Manturia Insurance Business Act in July.)
- 1938 - Taizō Ishizaka, former high-rank officer of Ministry of Communications become the President of Dai-ichi Life and licensed for business in Manchuria. Tokyo head office relocated to current place, Yurakucho, Hibiya.
- 1945 - The Tokyo head office was requisitioned as the Supreme Commander for the Allied Powers (GHQ) government building.
- 1975 - first overseas representative office is established in New York City.
- 1977 - begins to sell UU Insurance for the male.
- 1982 - first European representative office is established in London.
- 1990 - investment in Lincoln National Life Insurance Company marked the first time a Japanese company participated in capitalizing a leading U.S. insurer.
- 1993 - completion of the DN Tower 21, a new head office building.
- 1995 - Great Hanshin earthquake: simplification of claims settlement procedures.
- 1996 - establishment of the Dai-ichi Property and Casualty Insurance Co., Ltd.
- 1997 - establishment of Dai-ichi Life Research Institute Inc.
- 1999 - agreement on total business cooperation with the Industrial Bank of Japan (now Mizuho Financial Group.)
- 2000 - agreement to form a comprehensive business alliance with Sompo Japan Insurance and Aflac.
- 2002 - celebration of its 100th anniversary.
- 2010 - Demutualization and stock listing on the Tokyo Stock Exchange
- 2011 - completes take over of ASX listed Tower Australia life insurance company, the wholly owned subsidiary is then renamed TAL
- 2015 - purchased Protective Life Corporation

== As an institutional investor ==
As an institutional investor, Dai-ichi Life Holdings owns 230 Japanese companies' stocks as of 2022.

== Gallery ==
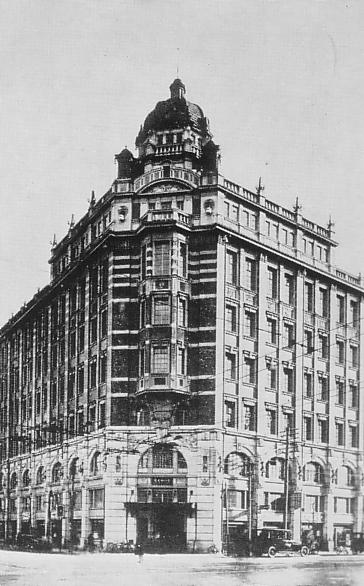
Dai-ichi Sougo-Kan, in 1921

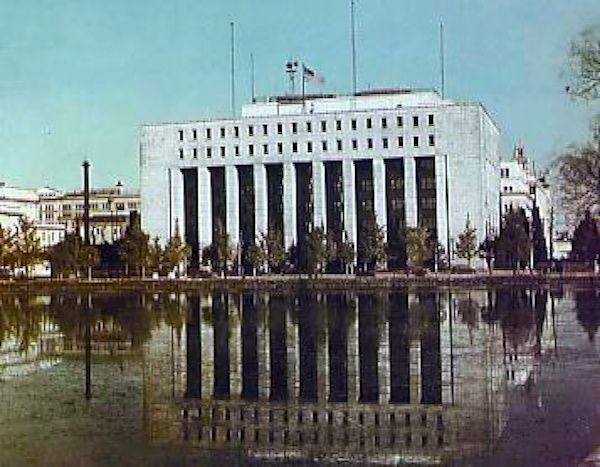
Tokyo Headquarter Building Built in 1938

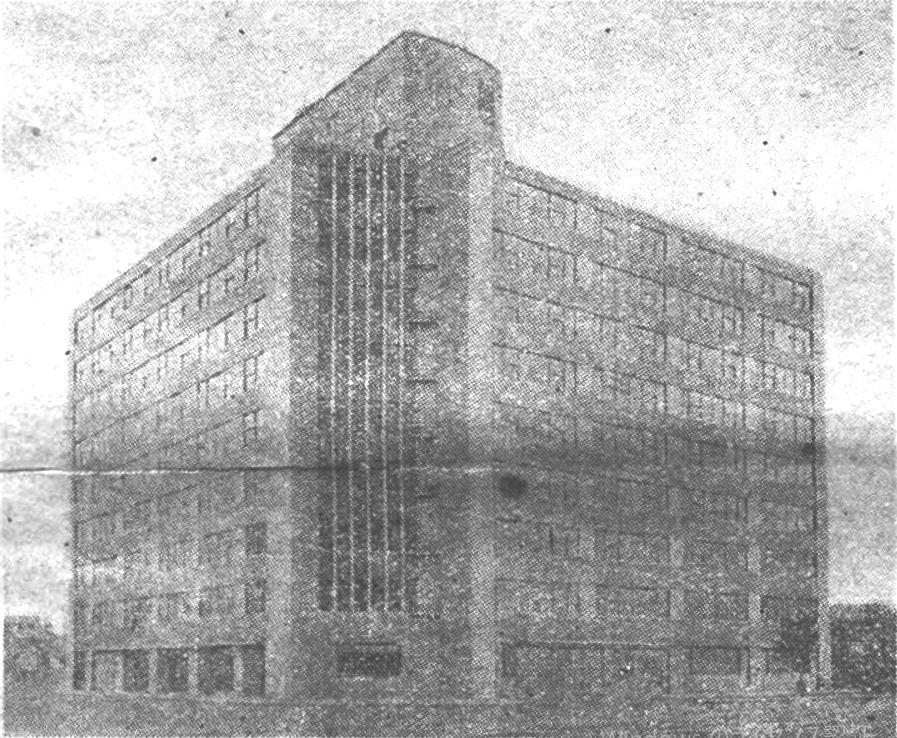
Osaka Headquarter Building constructed by Takenaka Corporation in 1953

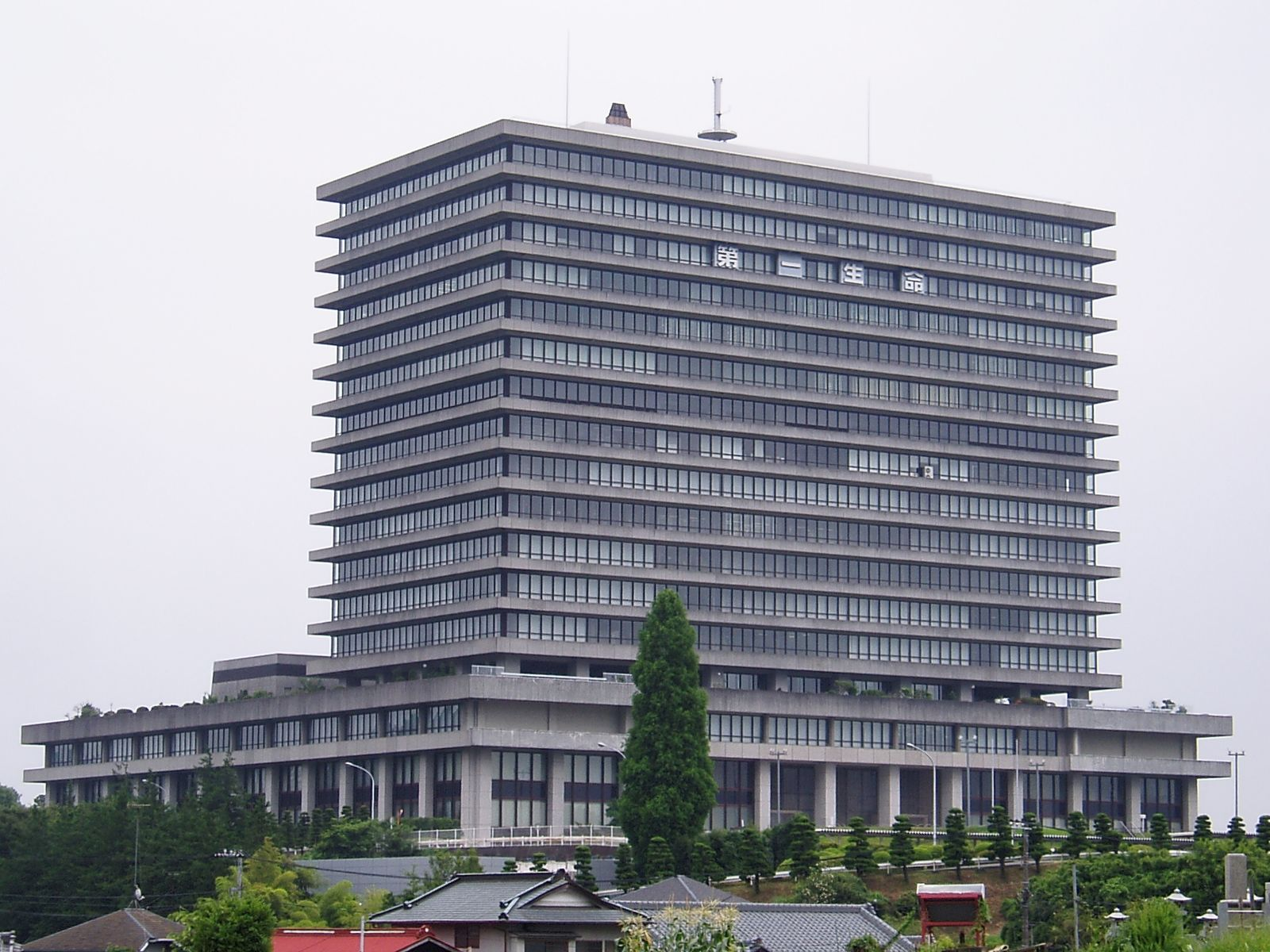
Kanagawa Branch Building built in 1967

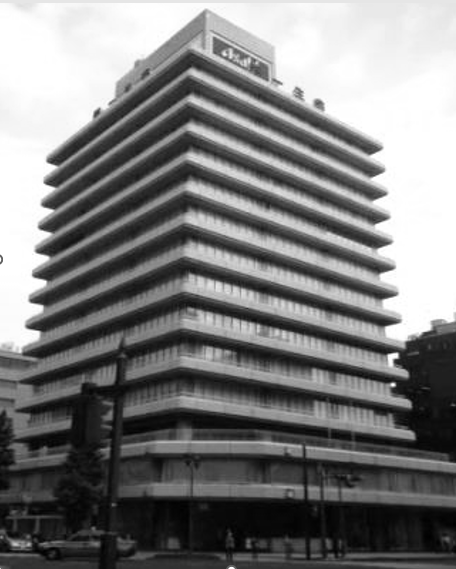
Rebuilt Sogo-kan Building in 1971

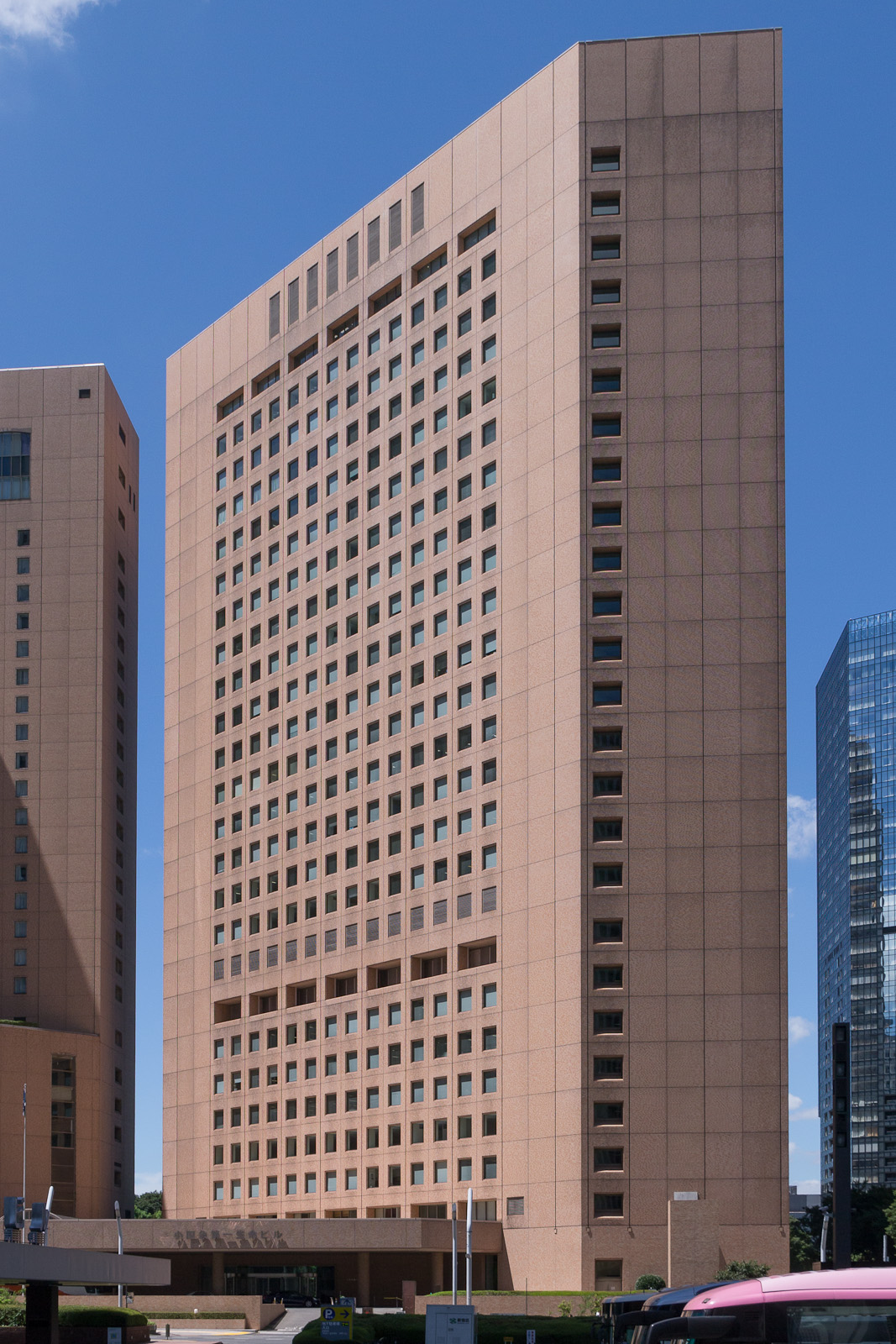
Odakyu Dai-ichi Life building built in 1980

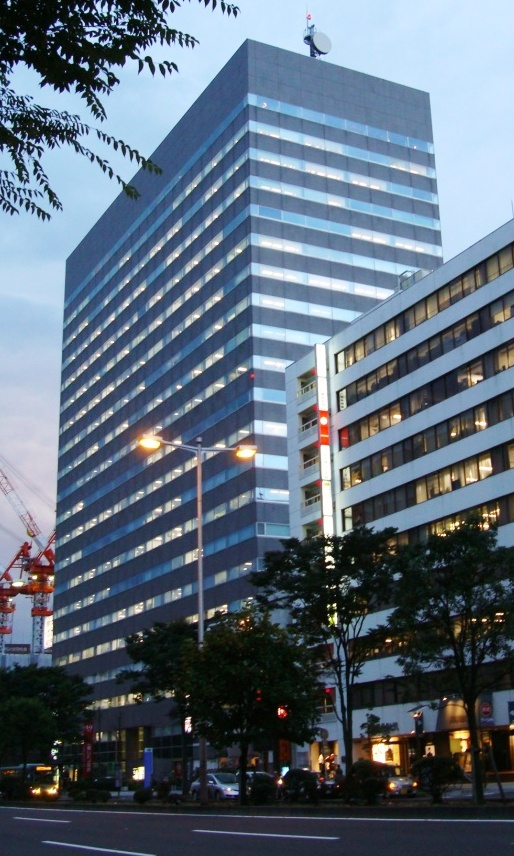
Sendai Branch Building built in 1985

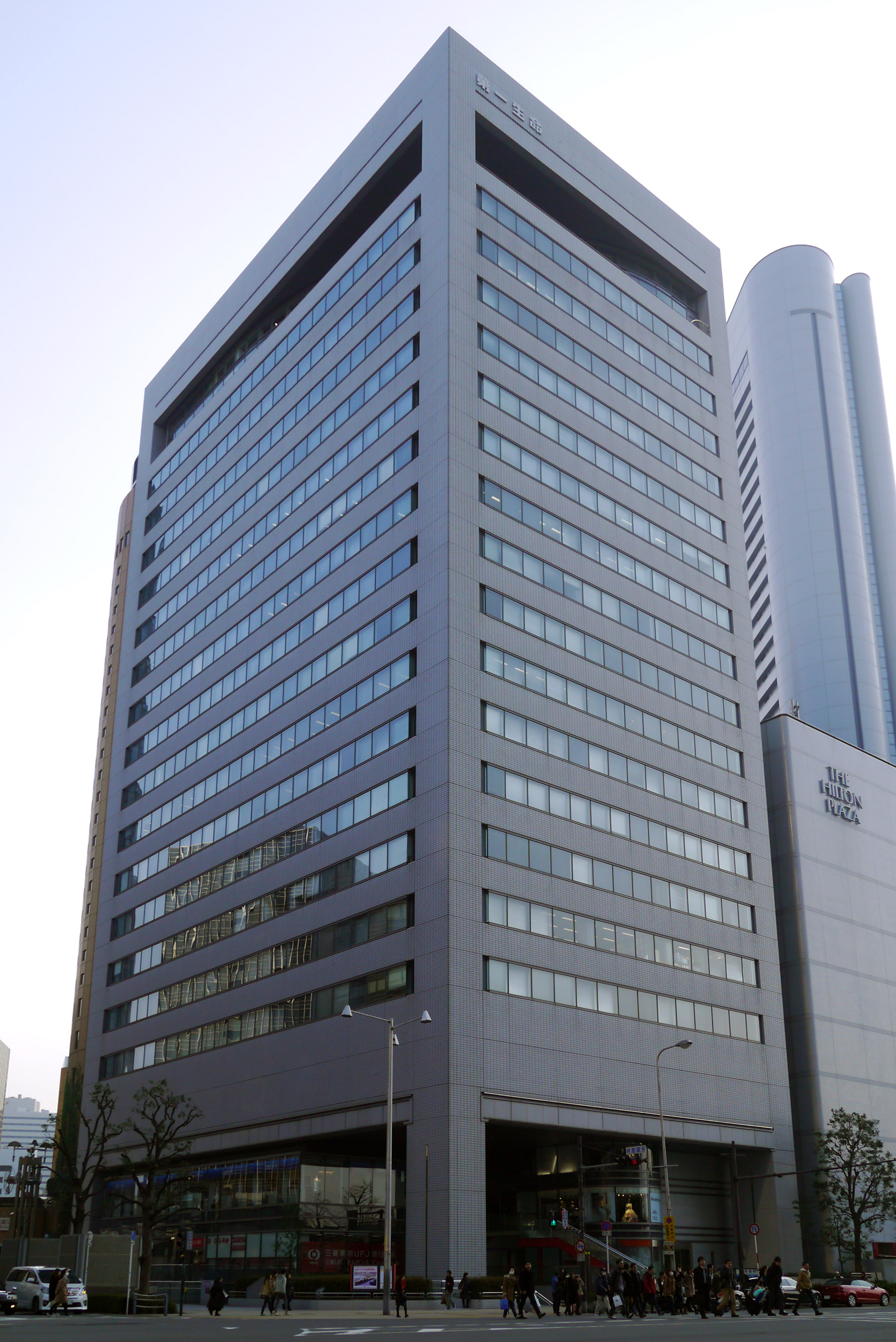
Osaka Dai-ichi Life building, built by Takenaka Corporation in 1990

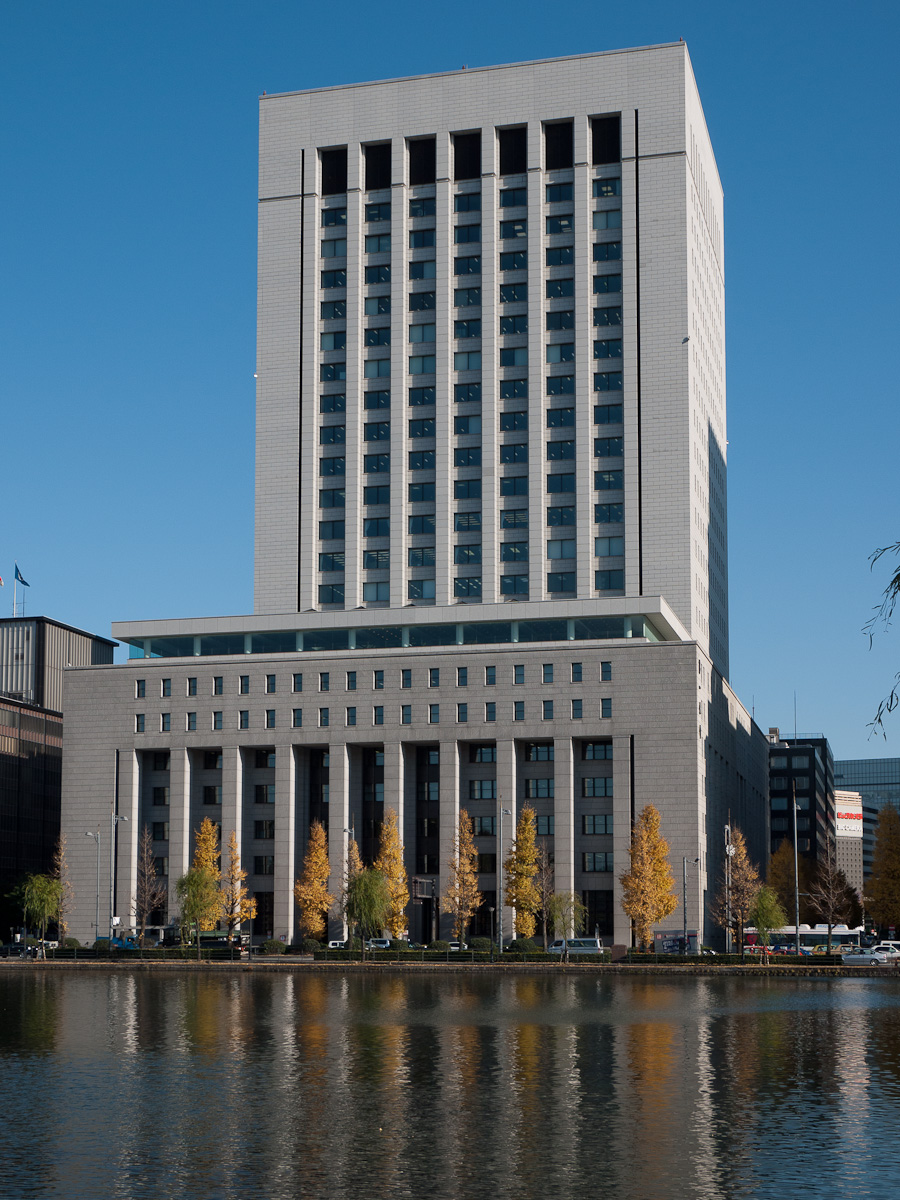
Hibiya Dai-ichi Life First Building, in 1993, constructed by Shimizu Corporation

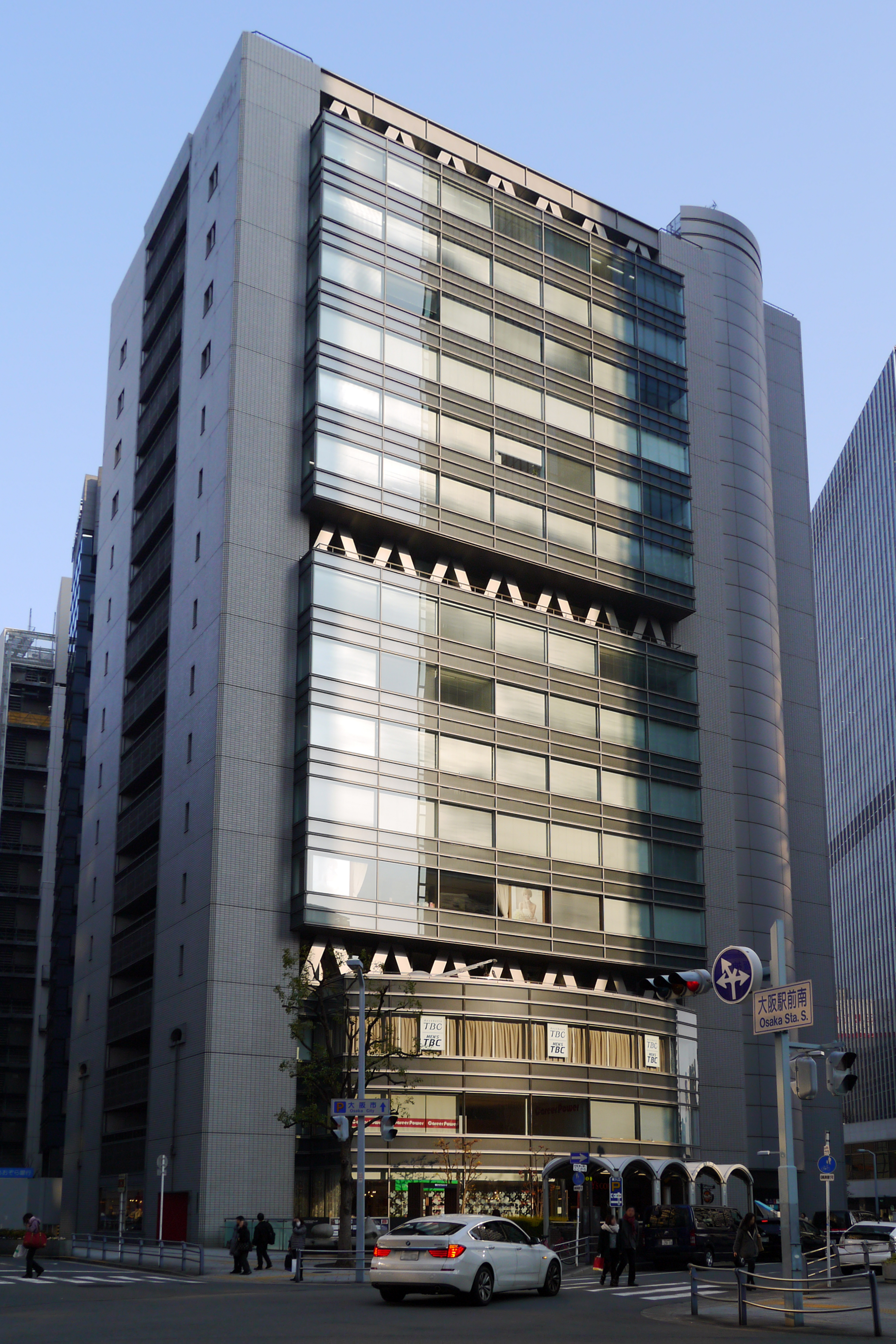
Umeda Building in 1995

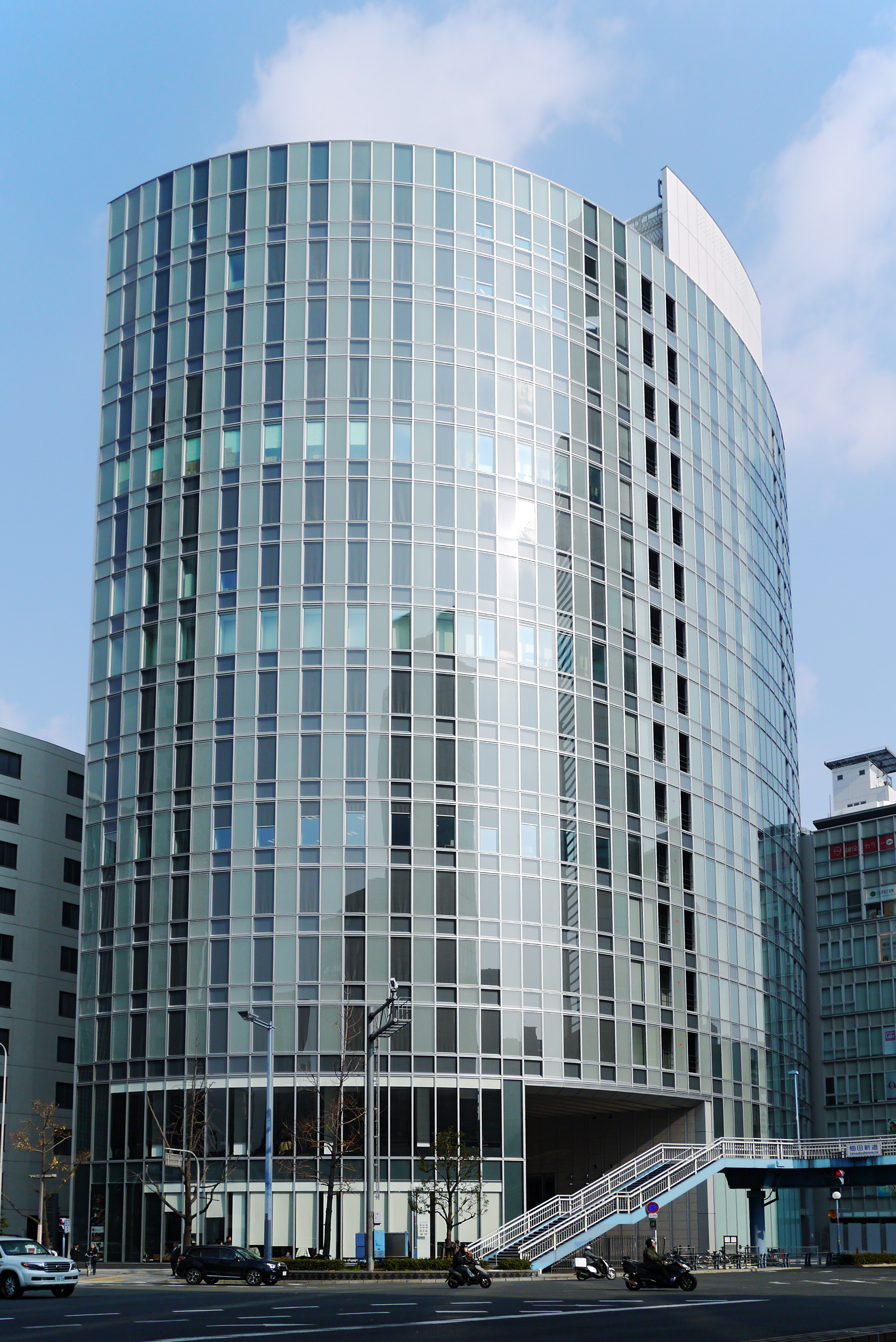
Umeshin Building in 2007 in Osaka

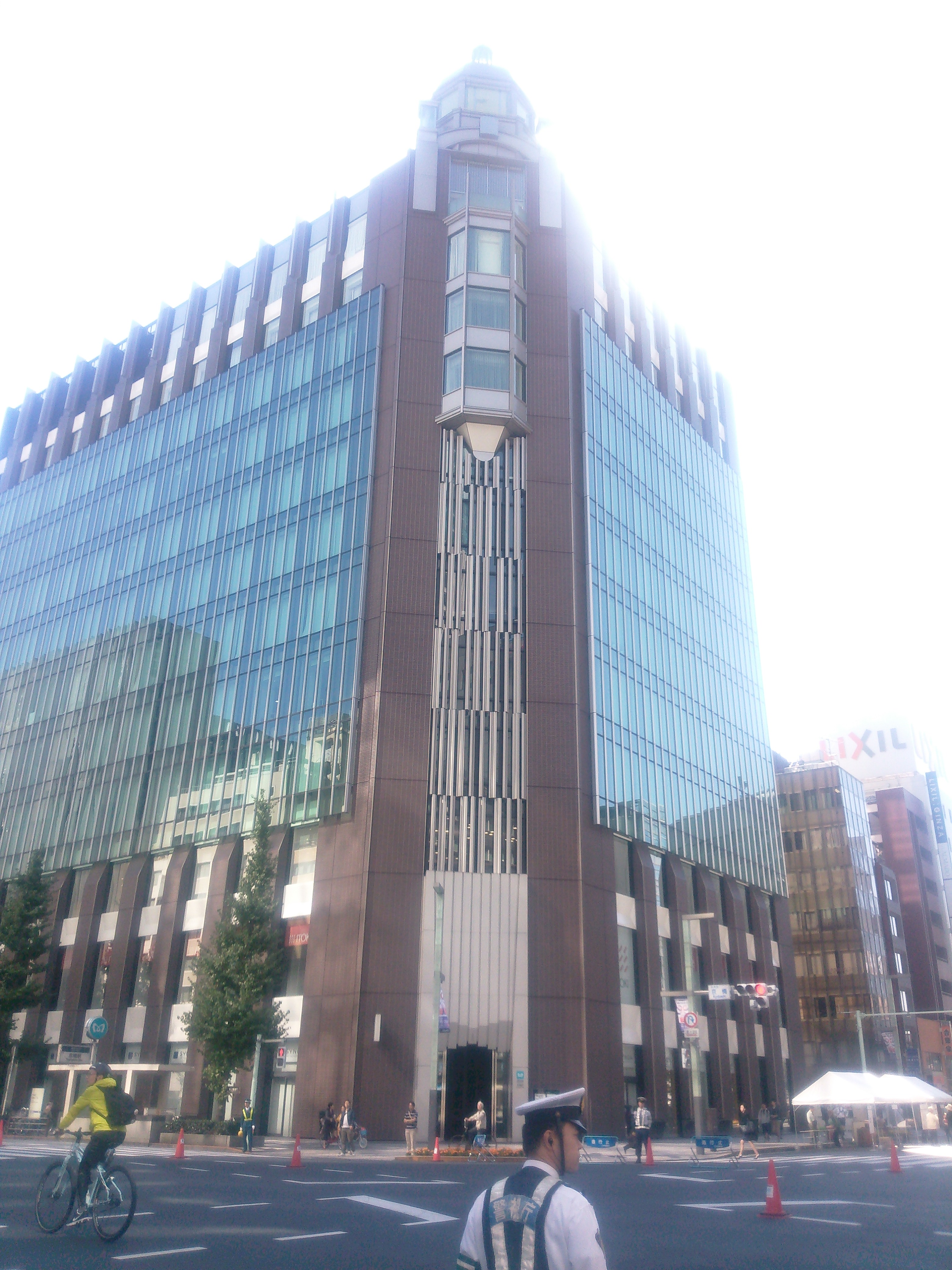
Sogo-kan 110 Tower in 2012 in Tokyo

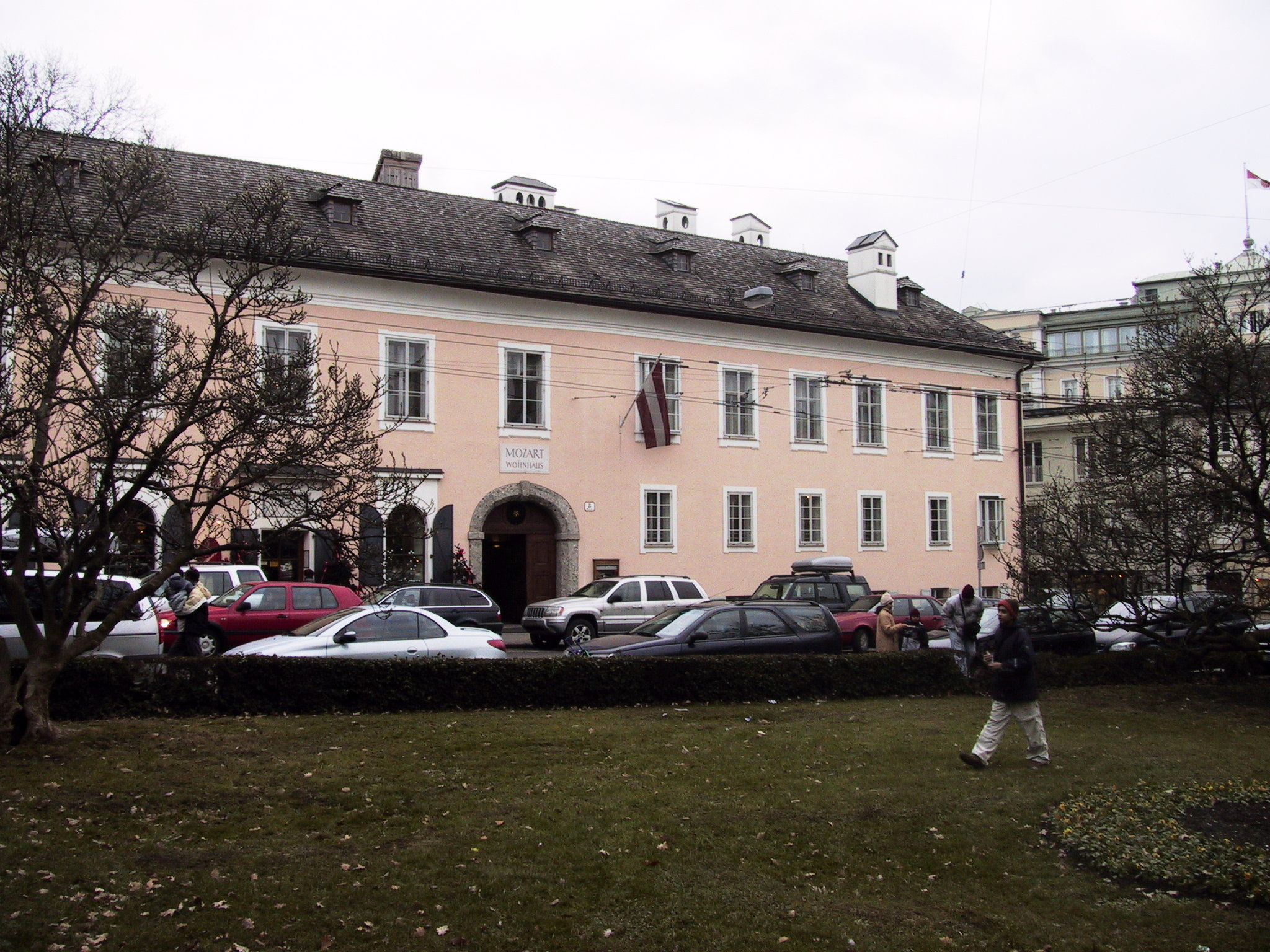
Participating the project of International Mozarteum Foundation

== See also ==
- Disney: is charged for the Dai-ichi Life's advertisement
