= Yoshihiro Suzuki =

Japanese baseball player

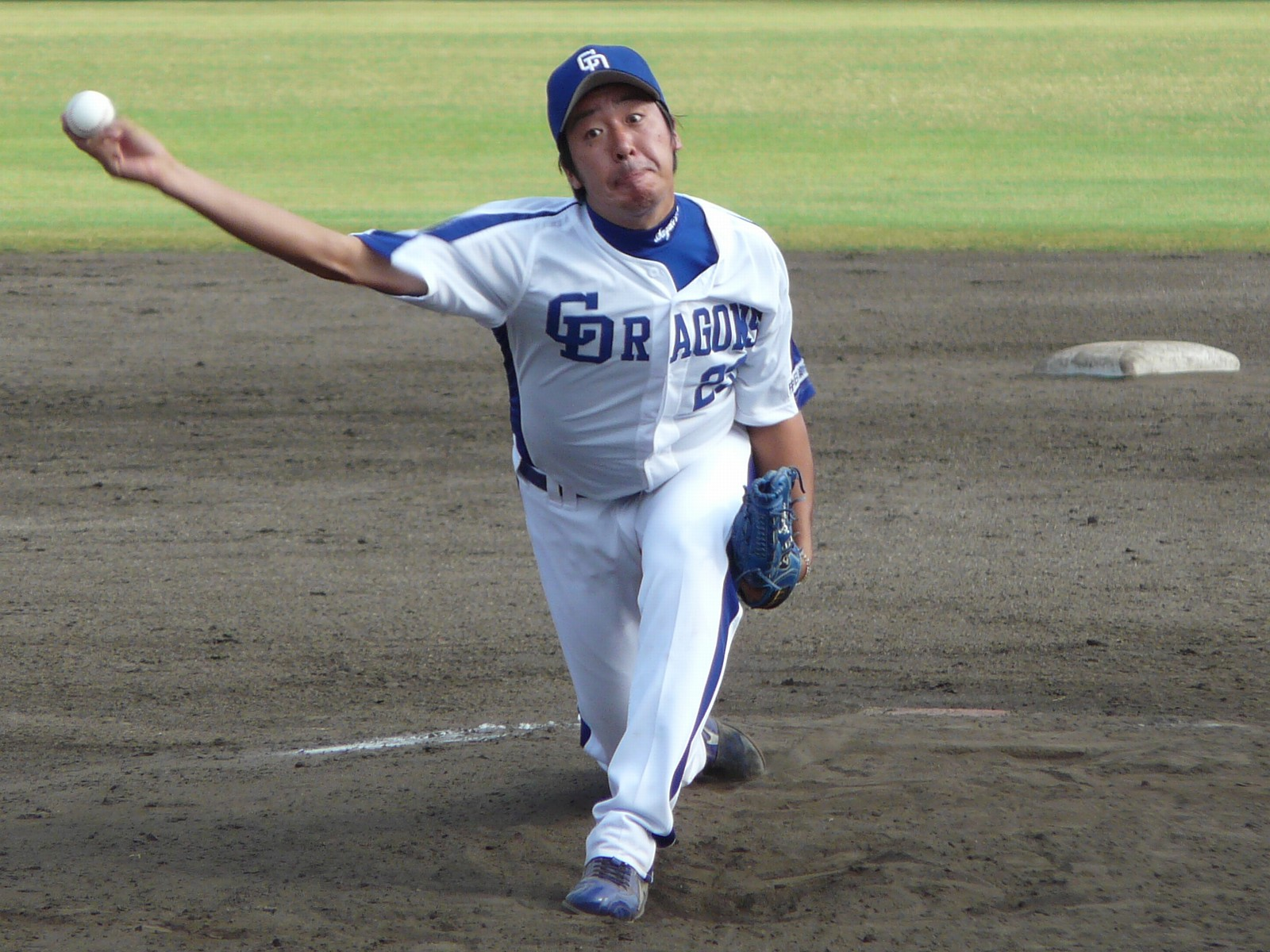
- Pitcher
- Born: January 5, 1983 (age 43)
- Bats: Right Throws: Right

NPB debut
- 2005, for the Chunichi Dragons

NPB statistics (through 2014)
- Win–loss record: 10–6
- ERA: 2.73
- Holds: 41
- Strikeouts: 194
- Stats at Baseball Reference

Teams
- Chunichi Dragons (2005–2014)

Yoshihiro Suzuki (鈴木 義広, born January 5, 1983, in Mannō, Kagawa Prefecture) is a Japanese retired professional baseball pitcher. He played for the Chunichi Dragons in Japan's Nippon Professional Baseball for the entirety of his career.

Since 2015, he has been employed as the Dragons scorer.
