= Central Union of Agricultural Cooperatives =

Independent administrative Japanese body

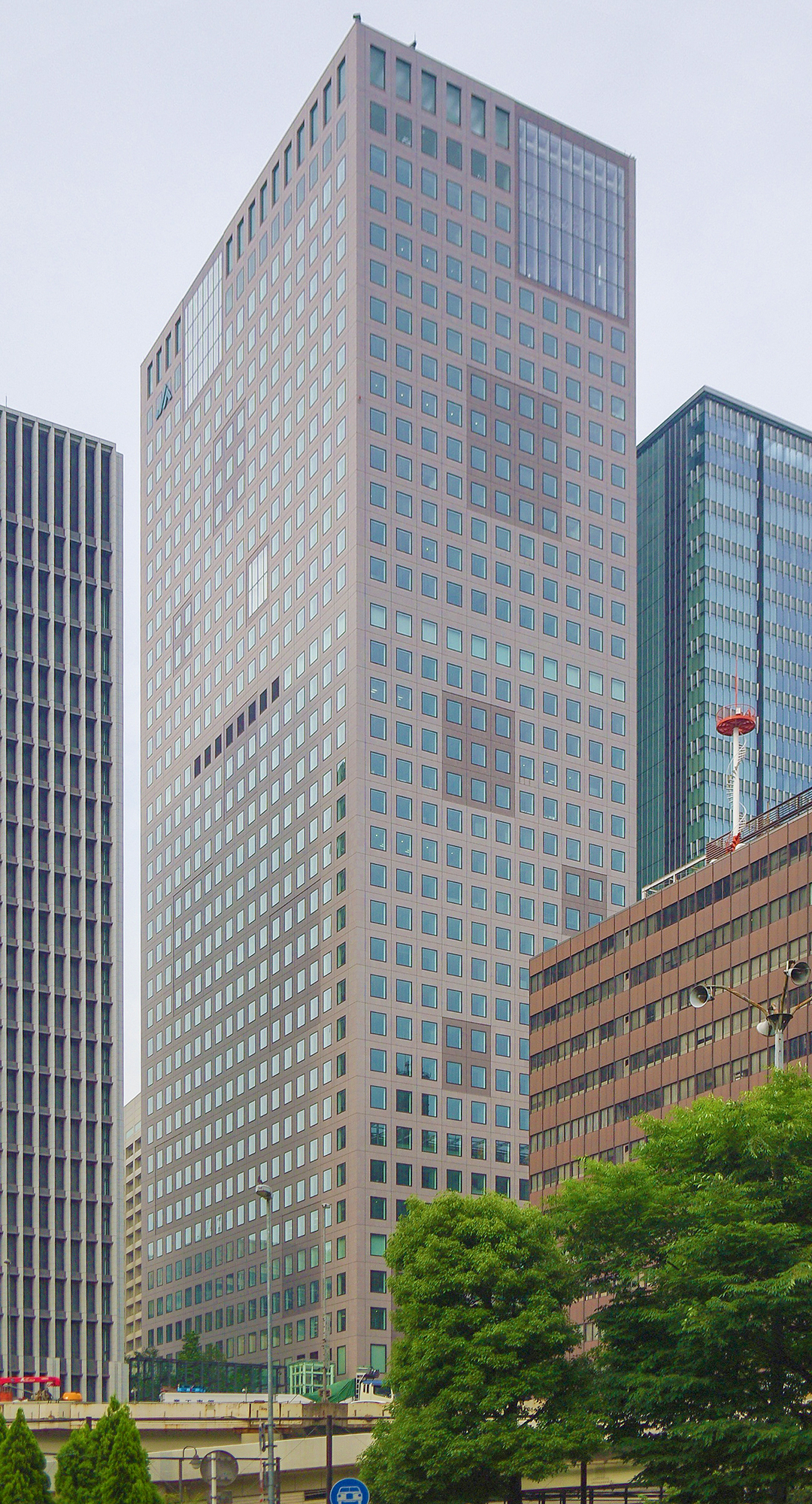
JA Building (center), the headquarters of JA-Zenchu in Tokyo.

The Central Union of Agricultural Co-operatives (全国農業協同組合中央会, Zenkoku Nōgyō-kyōdō-kumiai Chuōkai), in short JA-Zenchu (JA全中), is an independent administrative Japanese body within the Japan Agriculture (JA) Group which determines policy and administrates the group. Its legal status was originally a Recognised Corporate Body under the control of the Ministry of Agriculture, Forestry and Fisheries (MAFF), but since 2002 has become a Special Civilian Corporate Body.

== History ==
The body was founded for the aforementioned purposes in 1954. It gained larger recognition in the next year when it replaced the then existing Union of National Agricultural Cooperatives at the International Co-operative Alliance (ICA).

After its advent, Zenchu had been preoccupied with maintaining and increasing government price supports on rice and other crops and with holding back the import of cheaper agricultural products from abroad. Self-sufficient in rice, Japan in the early 1990s imported only a tiny quantity. A special variety of Thai rice, for example, is used specifically to make the traditional Okinawan liquor, awamori. Zenchu's determination to preserve "Fortress Japan" in the agricultural realm had brought it into conflict with business groups such as Keidanren, which advocated market liberalization and lower food prices. The Zenchu headquarters are coincidentally located next to the office of the Keidanren which it conflicts with.

Although closely allied to the LDP in the past, Nokyo and other agricultural groups were outraged by the government's concessions to the United States on imports of oranges and beef in 1988. Local cooperatives threatened to defect to the Japan Socialist Party if government continued to give in to United States demands. The Japan Socialist Party chairwoman at the time, Doi Takako, made agricultural protectionism a major component of her party's platform.

== Publications ==
The Zenchu circulates factbooks concerning food and agriculture in Japan, specifically, problems relating to food and food supply.

It also publishes monthly the Gekkan JA. The 2007 July issue focused on the international aid activities which the cooperatives undertake.

JA (short for Japan Agricultural Cooperatives) is another common name for Nokyo.

== See also ==
- Japan Agricultural Cooperatives
- Zen-Noh, National Federation of Agricultural Co-operative Associations
- Agriculture, forestry, and fishing in Japan
- Ministry of Agriculture, Forestry and Fisheries (Japan)
- Imperial Farmers Association (pre-war group)
