= Jin Watanabe (architect) =

Japanese architect

- 渡辺 仁
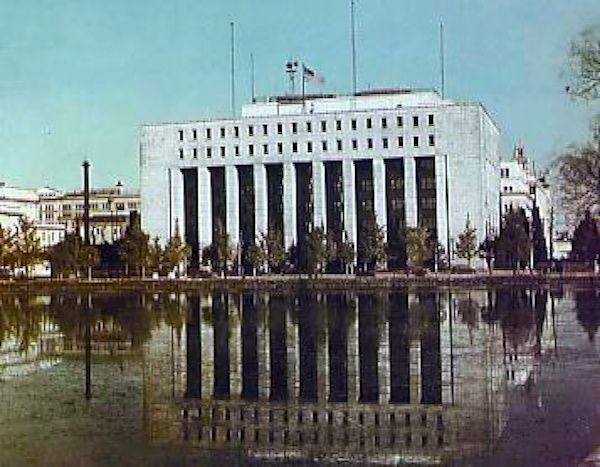
- GHQ Building
- Born: February 16, 1887; Sado, Niigata Prefecture, Japan
- Died: September 5, 1973 (aged 86)
- Other name: Hitoshi Watanabe
- Occupation: Architect
- Buildings: Tokyo National Museum Honkan

Jin Watanabe (渡辺 仁, Watanabe Jin; 16 February 1887 – 5 September 1973), also known as Hitoshi Watanabe, was a Japanese architect responsible for many buildings in the inter-war years.

== Biography ==
Jin Watanabe was born on February 16, 1887, in Sado, Niigata Prefecture, Japan, and grew up in Tokyo. His father was Wataru Watanabe (渡辺渡), who became director of the Tokyo Imperial University Institute of Technology. In July 1912, Watanabe graduated from Tokyo Imperial University's Institute of Technology, and after graduation, served at the Railroad Institute. In 1926, he visited Europe and the United States for architectural research.

=== Name ===
His given name (the character 仁) can be read as either Jin or Hitoshi.

== Works ==
Watanabe is known in particular for designing the Imperial Household Museum (1931-1938), the Hattori Clock shop, and the Daiichi Seimei Insurance Building (c. 1938, in collaboration with architect Yosaku Matsumoto) in Tokyo.

In 1931, a competition was held to replace the original Imperial Household Museum building. This had been designed by Josiah Conder and completed in 1882. However, it was destroyed by an earthquake in 1923. Watanabe won the competition with a design that followed the lineage of Imperial Crown Style, having a neoclassical base topped with tiled and gabled Japanese-style roofs. Although constructed from reinforced concrete, some elements of the building alluded to traditional Japanese timber construction techniques. It is today known as the Honkan building at the Tokyo National Museum.

The Dai-ichi Seimei building is located across the street from the main entrance to the Imperial Palace grounds in the Marunouchi area of Tokyo. It was chosen by General Douglas MacArthur as the site for Allied Headquarters from 1945 to 1952.

== Selected works ==
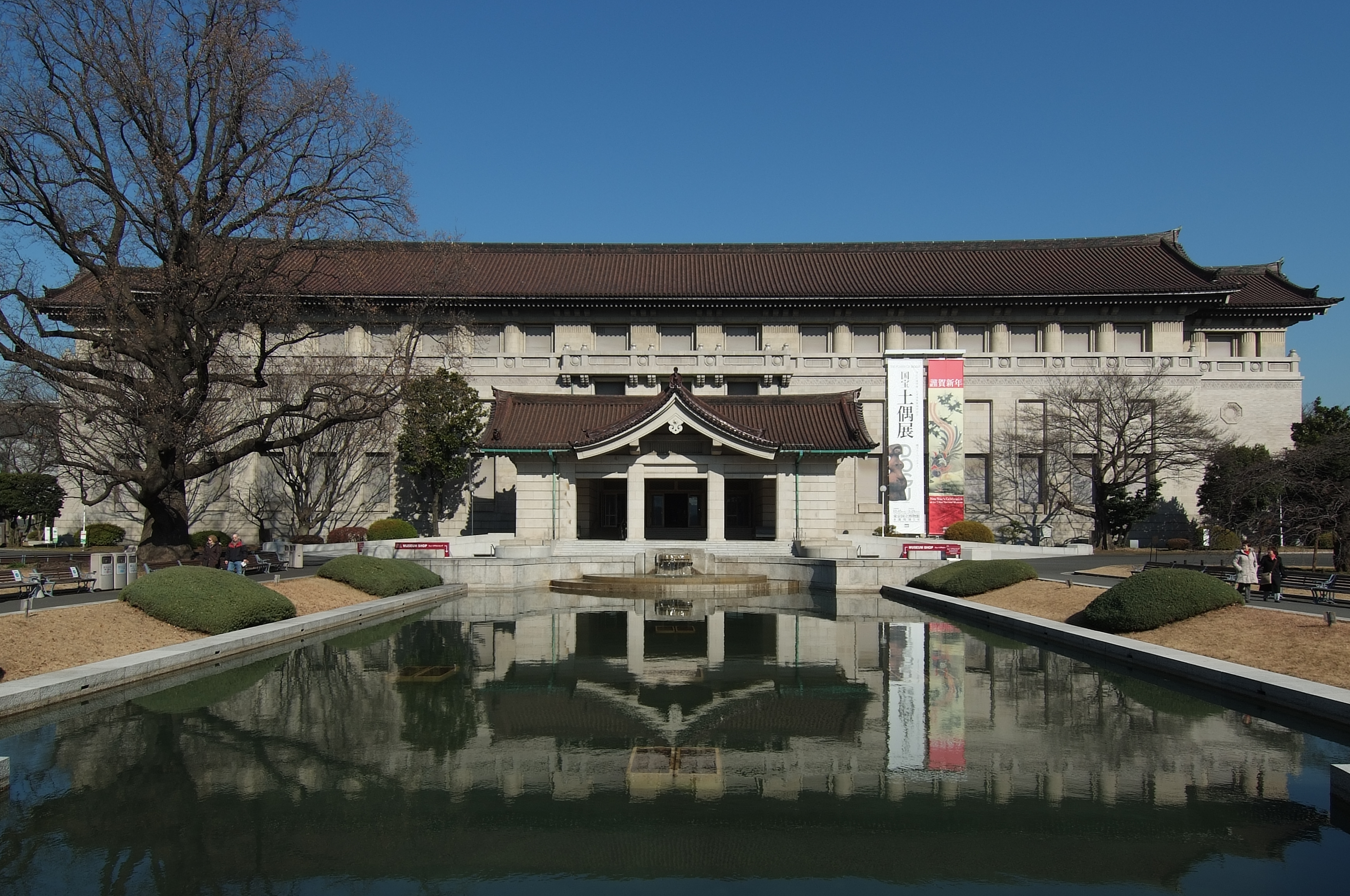
The Tokyo National Museum's Honkan building.

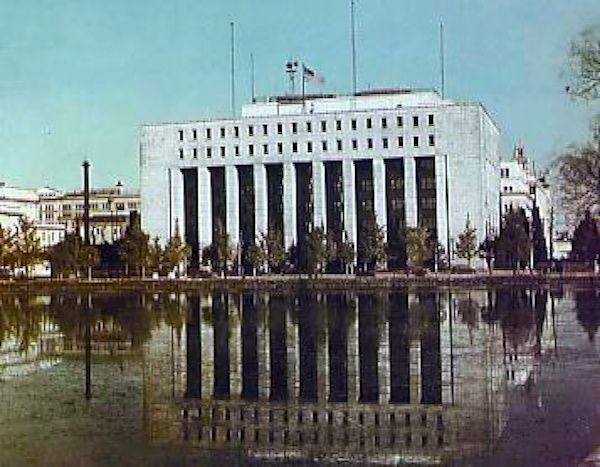
The Dai-ichi Seimei Building in the 1950s, when it was serving as Allied headquarters.

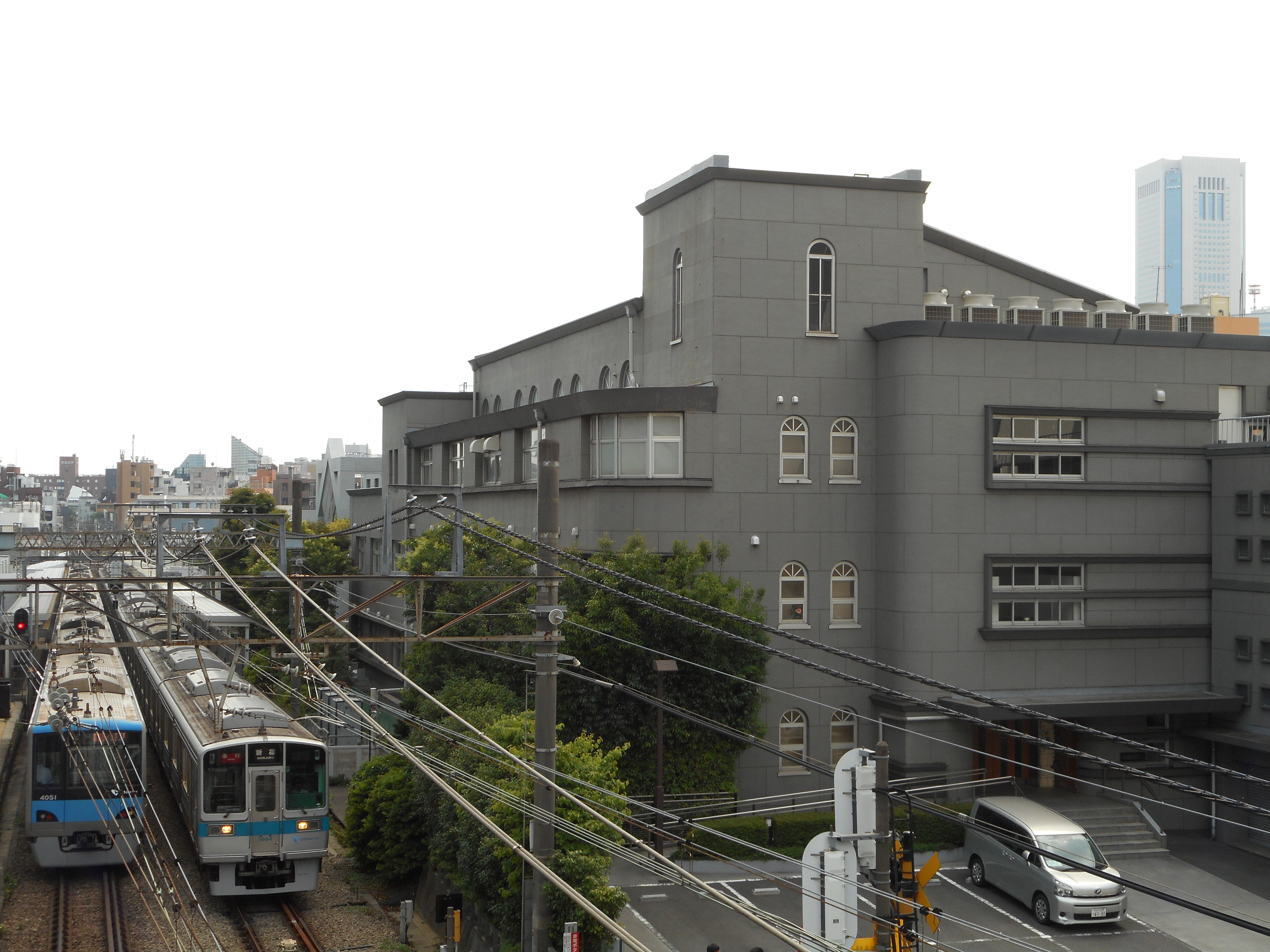
Odakyu Headquarters Building

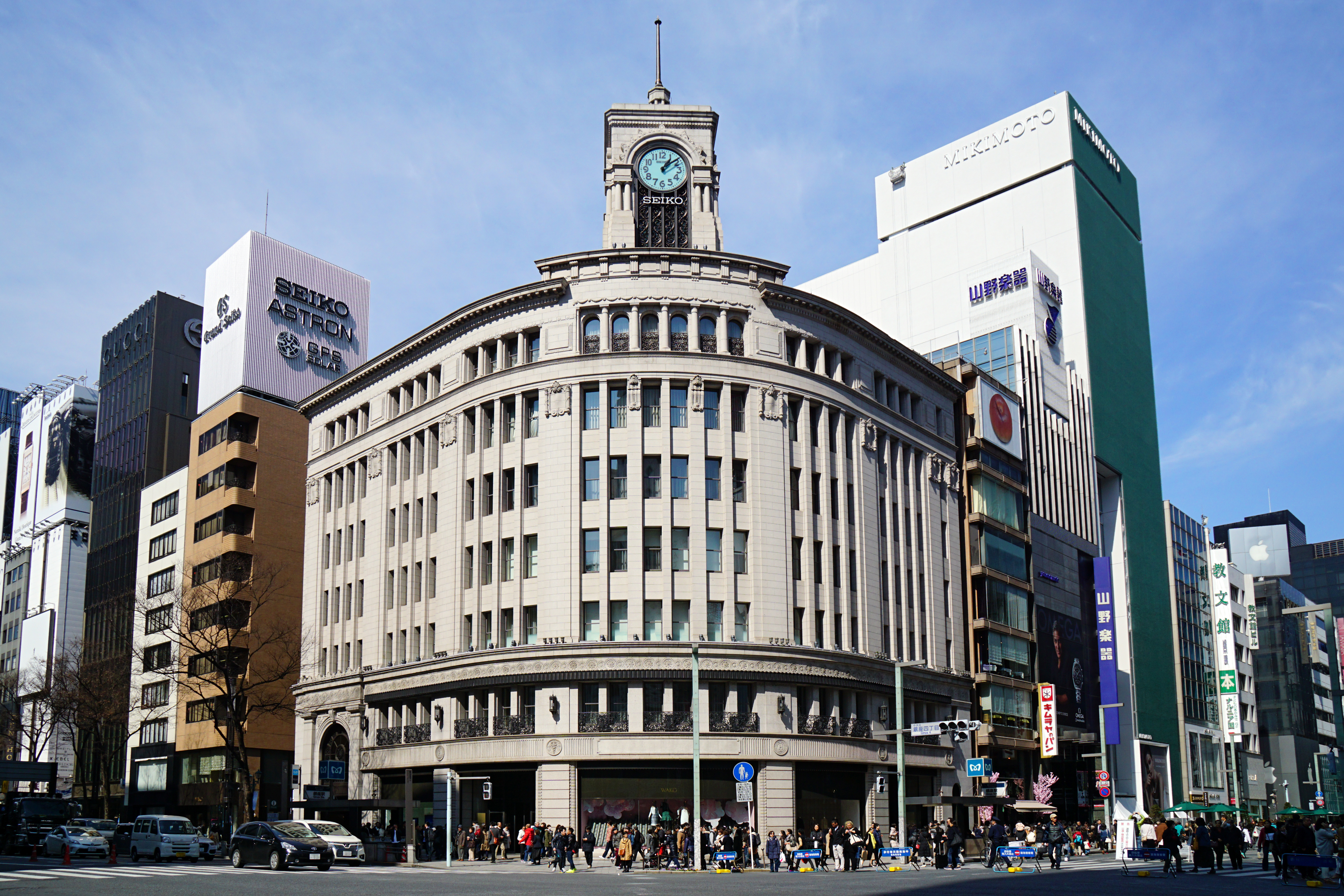
Former Hattori Clock Shop (Ginza 4-chome, Chuo Ward, Tokyo). Currently, it is the head office of Wako Co., Ltd., but it is still the registered head office of Seiko Holdings Inc.

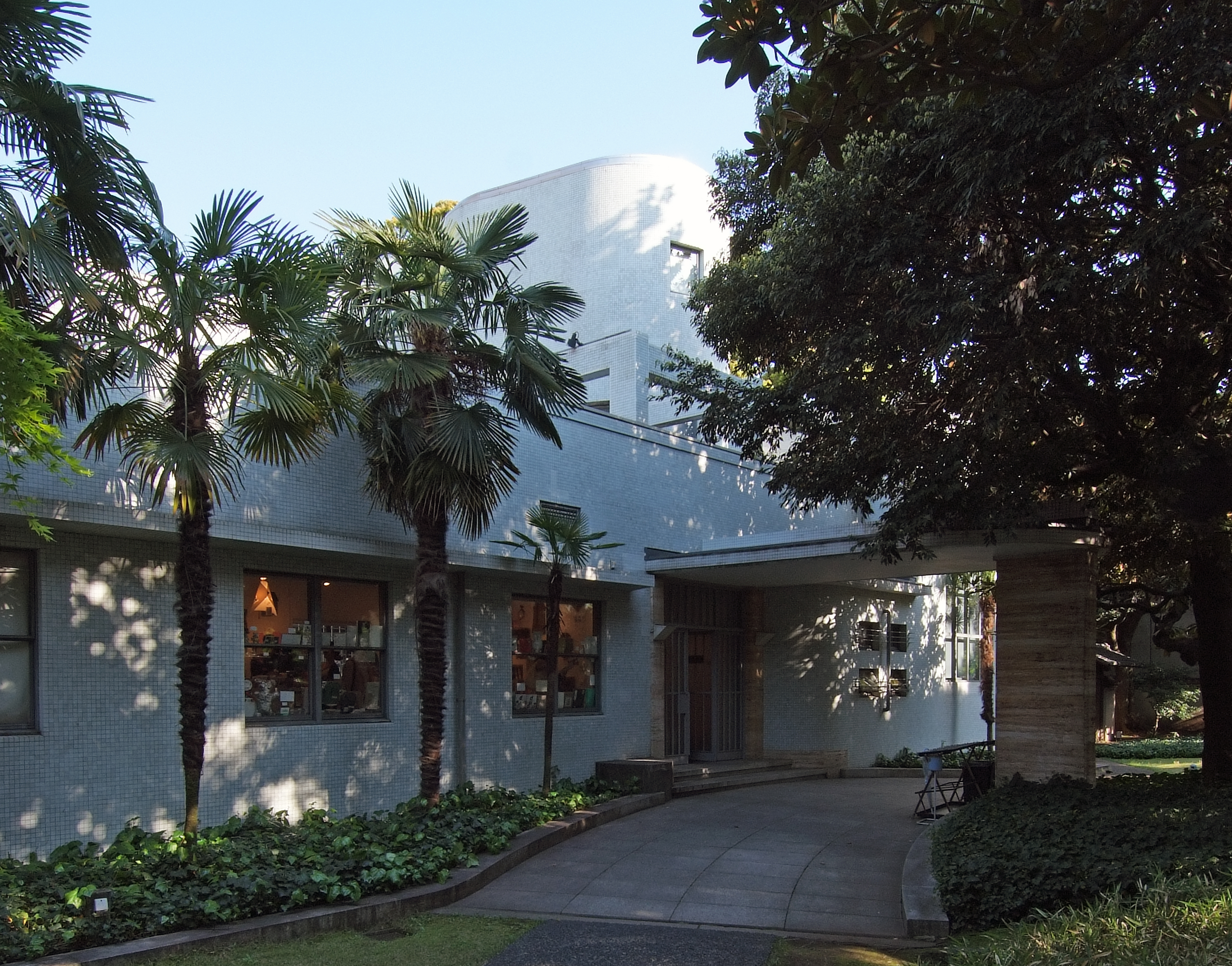
Hara Museum of Contemporary Art

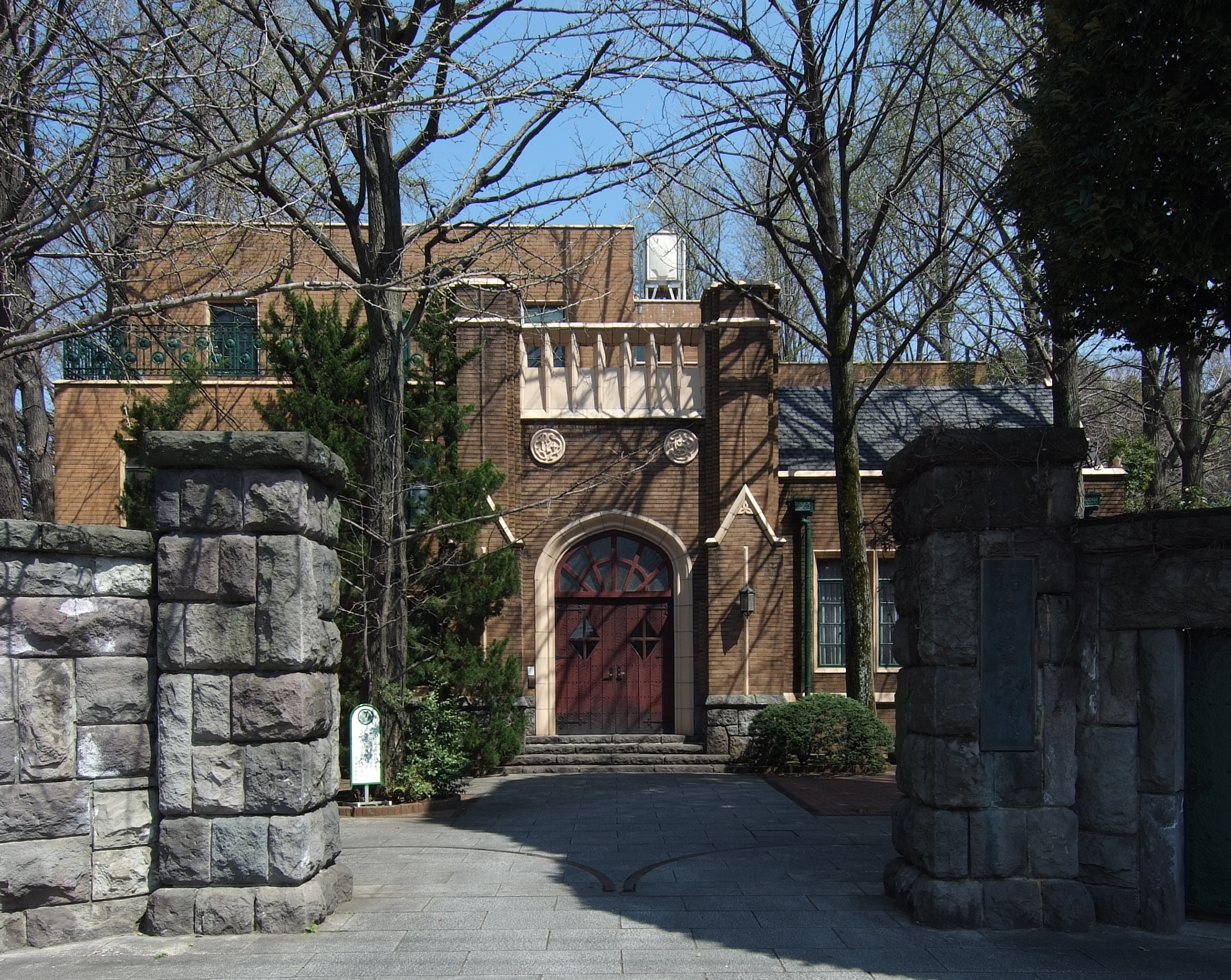
Tokugawa Reimeikai

- Takanawa Telephone Station (1918) Minato-ku, Tokyo. Tetsushin Ministry of Construction Division office building (demolished).
- Nihonbashi Telephone Office (1919) Chuo-ku, Tokyo. Tetsushin Ministry of Construction Division office building (demolished).
- Fuel Research Institute (1921) Kawaguchi City, Saitama Prefecture (demolished).
- Hotel New Grand (1927) Yokohama-city kanagawa prefecture.
- Dragon Corner Scattered Main Office (1923)
- Electric Club (1927)
- Odawara Express Railway Headquarters (1927) Shibuya-ku, Tokyo. Adjacent to Minami-Shinjuku Station . Expressionist style architecture. Odakyu Electric Railway moved its head office to Odakyu Meiji Yasuda Life Building in the west exit of Shinjuku Station in 1975, so it is now Odakyu Minami Shinjuku Building.
- Shinjuku Ward Waseda Elementary School (1928) Shinjuku-ku, Tokyo. Tokyo City was at the time of completion.
- Ando House (1928) Chiyoda ward, Tokyo. Constructed as a home of a founding company of a construction company, and is currently undergoing renovation, it remains in Tokyo's Nishikicho as an annex to the Miyauchi province.
- Tokugawa Yoshika's House (now Yatsugatake Kogen Hutte, 1928)
- Hattori Clock Shop (1932) Chuo-ku, Tokyo. Neo-renaissance style. Currently, the head office of Wako Co., Ltd., but still the registered head office of Seiko Holdings Inc.
- Tokugawa Reimei Headquarters Building (1932) Mejiro in Toshima Ward, Tokyo.
- Japanese theater (1933) Chiyoda ward, Tokyo. Expressionist style architecture (demolished). Yurakucho Marion is built in the ruins .
- Norin Chuo Bank Yurakucho Building (1933) Chiyoda ward, Tokyo. Historicist style architecture with Ionian style colonnade (demolished). Image reproduction on the wall of DN tower 21. The site is the new building (high rise building) of DN Tower 21.
- Tokyo Imperial Museum planning plan, Taito-Ku, Tokyo. Current Tokyo National Museum Main Building. Competition winning plan. The implementation design is Miyauchi Interior Takumi Dormitory (completed in 1937) and Watanabe was not involved in the implementation design. Generally classified as a masterpiece of the Imperial Crown style (there are also architectural historians who cast doubt on the classification, such as Fujinobu Terunobu).
- Toyoko Department Store (1934) Shibuya-ku, Tokyo. Later Tokyu Department Store Toyoko Store East Building. It was demolished in 2013.
- Hinata Atami Bettei (1934) Atami City, Shizuoka Prefecture. Japanese-style architecture with two floors. Basement part (1936) which B. Taut designed interior for is important cultural property of country. Watanabe-designed Japanese-style architecture (seater) is designated as an important cultural property.
- Osaka Broadcasting Hall (1936) Baba-cho, Chuo-ku, Osaka City, Osaka Prefecture. Winner in nominated design competition. Demolished in 2002.
- Tenmaya Okayama store (1936) Kita Ward, Okayama City, Okayama Prefecture.
- Ishizaka Taizo House (1937) Shibuya-ku, Tokyo. The residence of Taizo Ishizaka, then managing director of Dai-ichi Life, and later chairman of the Keidanren, is now used as a Bulgarian ambassador's residence.
- Dai-ichi Seiyakukan (1938) Chiyoda ward, Tokyo. Former Dai-ichi Life Insurance Mutual Company Main Building. Joint design with Yosaku Matsumoto. It is famous for the headquarters of the GHQ being set up after the Pacific War in Japan during the Japanese Occupation . It was also partially preserved and redeveloped together with the Norin Chuo Kenko Yurakucho building designed by Watanabe. The west side part is used as a main building of the DN tower 21 with a part of the frame left.
- Hara House (1938) Shinagawa Ward, Tokyo. The current Hara Museum of Art. Watanabe's work adopts a rare early modernism style.
- Fukuya Hacchobori Main Store (Hiroshima) (1938). Hiroshima, Hiroshima Prefecture. Interior destroyed in atomic bombing, but the shell remains and is in use, retaining much of its original appearance.
