= Zen-Noh =

Japanese federation of agricultural cooperatives

ZEN-NOH
- Type: Cooperative federation
- Industry: agriculture
- Founded: 1972
- Headquarters: Japan
- Number of employees: 12,557
- Website: zennoh.or.jp

The National Federation of Agricultural Co-operative Associations (全国農業協同組合連合会, Zenkoku Nōgyō Kyōdō Kumiai Rengōkai), in short ZEN-NOH (全農, Zennō), is a federation of agricultural cooperatives in Japan. ZEN-NOH was formed in 1972 with the joining of the ZENHANREN group (National Marketing Federation of Agricultural Cooperative Associations) and the ZENKOREN group (National Purchasing Federation of Agricultural Cooperative Associations). ZEN-NOH consists of 1,173 agricultural cooperatives and federations that in 2004 had a combined revenue of $53.8 billion (USD). ZEN-NOH is involved in the marketing, tracking, and quality assurance of the products of its cooperatives. As of 2006, ZEN-NOH has declared that it will not participate in the research and development of genetically modified foods. ZEN-NOH is one of the world's largest importers of animal feeds and agricultural fertilizers. 70% of the sales of chemical fertilizers in Japan are handled by them. ZEN-NOH is also largely involved in the production of farming equipment, primarily tractors.

== Subsidiaries ==
Zen-Noh Grain Corporation, a subsidiary, is headquartered in Covington, Louisiana.
