= W. David Marx =

American fashion and culture writer

- Born: November 30, 1978 (age 47); Oklahoma, US
- Citizenship: American
- Education: Harvard University (BA); Keio University (MA)
- Occupation: Author
- Notable work: Ametora: How Japan Saved American Style; Status and Culture: How Our Desire for Social Rank Creates Taste, Identity, Art, Fashion, and Constant Change
- Website: www.neomarxisme.com

William David Marx, known professionally as W. David Marx, is an American fashion and culture writer who works and lives in Tokyo, Japan. He is the author of Ametora: How Japan Saved American Style (2015) and Status and Culture: How Our Desire for Social Rank Creates Taste, Identity, Art, Fashion, and Constant Change (2022). Marx also publishes a newsletter titled Culture: An Owner's Manual. He previously worked at Google as part of the Asia-Pacific Team in Corporate and Product Communication.

== Early life ==
Marx was born in Oklahoma to a Jewish father and lived there until age 6, before moving to Oxford, Mississippi and later Pensacola, Florida. His parents met at Vanderbilt University before his father became an academic. Marx grew up in an upper-middle-class home and attended an International Baccalaureate school.

In the early 1990s, Marx's parents began visiting Japan for work and brought back souvenirs including Gundam figurines and manga comics. This exposure to Japanese culture influenced Marx's later interest in the country.

== Education ==
After visiting Japan in high school through an International Baccalaureate program, Marx enrolled in a B.A. in East Asian Studies at Harvard University, where he became a member of The Harvard Lampoon.

During his freshman summer in 1998, Marx interned at publisher Kodansha in Tokyo, working at manga and fashion magazines including Hot-Dog Press and Checkmate. This experience introduced him to Japanese streetwear, particularly the brand A Bathing Ape. His exposure to this fashion scene led to his senior thesis titled Going Ape: "A Bathing Ape" Street-wear and the Culture of Fashion for Japanese Youth in the 1990s, for which he received Harvard's Noma-Reischauer Prize in Japanese Studies in 2001.

After graduating from Harvard, Marx moved to Japan at age 24 to attend Keio University, where he earned a Master's degree in Business with a specialization in Marketing and Consumer behavior.

== Ametora: How Japan Saved American Style ==
Following the 2010 English publication of Take Ivy, a Japanese photography book depicting Ivy League student attire from the 1960s, Marx began researching the history of Japan's adoption of American collegiate style. Through connections with former employees of VAN Jacket, Marx gained access to key figures in Japan's Americana fashion movement.

In 2013, Marx began writing Ametora: How Japan Saved American Style while working full-time at Google. The book traces the development of Japanese fashion from its adoption of American collegiate style to modern streetwear.

The book has sold over 50,000 copies in English and was later serialized in the Japanese fashion magazine Popeye. It has been translated into multiple languages, including Chinese, where it was retitled Harajuku Cowboy.

Following the book's publication, Marx was appointed to the Board of Directors of Nigo's brand Human Made.

== Status and Culture ==
Marx's second book, Status and Culture: How Our Desire for Social Rank Creates Taste, Identity, Art, Fashion, and Constant Change (2022), examines the relationship between social status and cultural trends. The book investigates how cultural tastes, behavior, speech habits, and fashion choices communicate information about social status.

The book received mixed reviews. Writing for The New York Times, Kaitlin Phillips praised Marx's previous narrow approach in Ametora but criticized Status and Culture for its broad scope, writing that its "comprehensiveness threatens to render 'Status and Culture' a dull but effective teaching text." Eileen G'Sell, reviewing for Jacobin, noted that the book "effectively demonstrates how status signifiers emerge and evolve" but argued it "stops short of providing any real sense of how a more egalitarian set of cultural semiotics contributes anything approaching greater equality."

== Personal life ==
Marx has lived in Tokyo since the early 2000s.
