= Van Jacket =

Japanese clothing company

Van Jacket Inc.
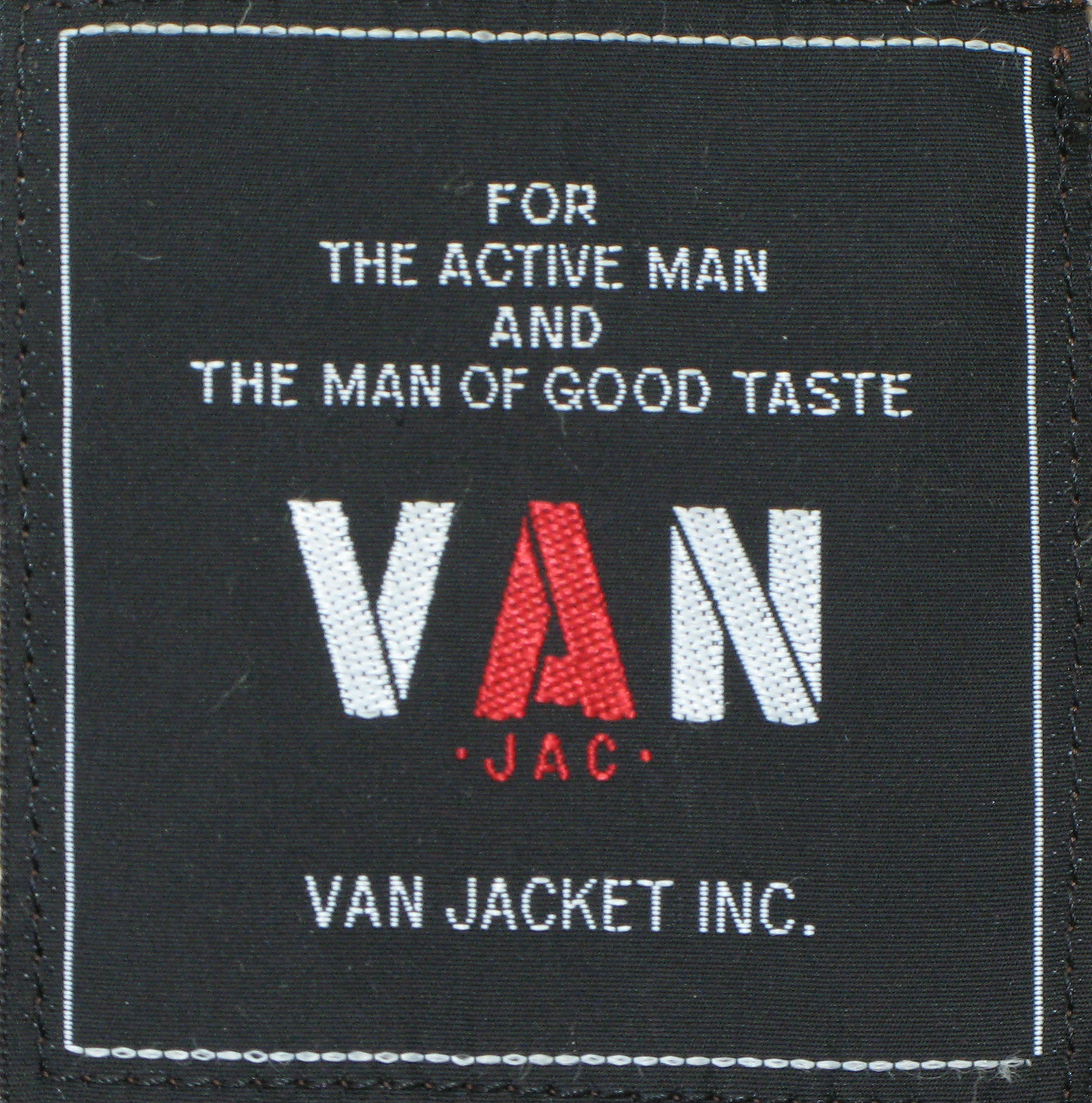
- VAN brand tag, c. 1970
- Native name: 株式会社ヴァンヂャケット
- Industry: Apparel
- Founded: 1951; 75 years ago in Osaka, Japan
- Founder: Kensuke Ishizu
- Fate: Filed for corporate reorganization in 1978; re-established in 1980; bankrupt again in 1984
- Headquarters: Aoyama, Tokyo, Japan
- Area served: Japan
- Owner: Itochu (from 2000)

Van Jacket Inc. (株式会社ヴァンヂャケット, Kabushiki-gaisha Van Jaketto) is a Japanese apparel company.

It introduced American culture and American traditional style to Japan beginning in the 1950s, and from the 1960s to the 1970s it dominated the Japanese fashion scene, creating such 1960s trends as the "Ivy look" and the Miyuki-zoku and establishing a culture of men's fashion and lifestyle with its T.P.O. (Time Place Occasion) terminology.

== Overview ==
The company was founded by Kensuke Ishizu in Minami-ku, Osaka. In the 1950s, the brand focused on men's clothing, mainly suits, but in the 1960s, it shifted to the American Ivy. Symbolic of this shift was a photo book titled Take Ivy published in 1965. A team from the company, including photographer Teruyoshi Hayashida, Shosuke Ishizu, Toshiyuki Kurosu, and Hajime Hasegawa, visited the eight Ivy League campuses on the U.S. East Coast and photographed real Ivy Leaguers, capturing them in film and in the book. The company's New England-style fashion was called Ivy (アイビー, aibii). In 1982, the magazine Hot-Dog Press devoted an issue to Ishizu; it became the first issue of that magazine to outsell its rival Popeye.

The Ivy look became popular among the fashion-oriented young people who gathered on Miyuki-dori Avenue in Tokyo in the 1960s, collectively known as the Miyuki-zoku (みゆき族, Miyuki tribe). Among the Miyuki-zoku, even carrying a VAN brand paper bag was considered fashionable, and "VAN" continued to be at the forefront of the Japanese fashion scene after that. Even into the 1970s, there seemed to be some enthusiasts for the brand, and it also formed a genre.

The company’s headquarters was in Aoyama, Tokyo. They also contained an American football team, the VANGUARDS, as an in-house club, the company was at the forefront of its time and was very notable among young people.

After peaking at 45.2 billion yen in sales in the fiscal year ended February 1975, the company's performance deteriorated sharply. The company sought human resources and financial support from trading companies such as Marubeni Corporation and Mitsubishi Corporation, as well as material manufacturers such as Toyobo and Kanebo. However, the combination of the recession caused by the oil shock, intensifying competition in the apparel industry, and failure to attract a new customer base led the company to file for protection under the Corporate Reorganization Law on April 6, 1978, effectively bringing it to bankruptcy.

On December 3, 1980, Van Jacket New Co., Ltd. was established, inheriting the trademarks and other intellectual property rights held by (old) Van Jacket Co., Ltd. On March 25, 1981, Van Jacket New Co., Ltd. was renamed to (New) Van Jacket Co., Ltd., and was rebuilt thanks to the efforts of former employees. However, the founder was no longer primarily involved in management. The company went bankrupt again in 1984; in 2000 it was bought by Itochu Trading company.

In 2008, VAN's 1965 photo book "Take Ivy" was posted on an American fashion blog and went viral, leading to the publication of the English edition by a Brooklyn-based publisher in 2010, which sold 50,000 copies worldwide. It was displayed in stores such as Ralph Lauren and J.Crew, and became widely commented in magazines and other media as a neo-Ivy style.
