= Olive (fashion magazine) =

Japanese magazine for girls (1982–2003)

- Cover of premiere issue, June 1982
- Native name: オリーブ
- Categories: Fashion
- Frequency: Bimonthly
- Publisher: Heibon Shuppan
- Founder: Yamato Shiine, Yoshihisa Kinameri
- Founded: 1981
- First issue: June 3, 1982
- Final issue Number: August 1, 2003; 442
- Country: Japan
- Language: Japanese

Olive was a Japanese fashion magazine founded in June 1982 by Heibon Shuppan as a sister publication to Popeye, a men's fashion magazine. Advertised as a "magazine for city girls", it became popular throughout the 1980s and 1990s, with its final issue published in August 2003.

== History ==
Olive was founded by Yamato Shiine, who was the magazine's first editor-in-chief. Shiine worked under the publisher and editor of Popeye magazine, Yoshihisa Kinameri. Olive was initially published as a supplement magazine with issues of Popeye, beginning on 5 November 1981.

Olive was published as a separate magazine to Popeye on 3 June 1982. It was released bimonthly. Its debut cover featured the character Olive Oyl from the Popeye comics. The cover was designed by Seiichi Horiuchi, with direction by Masahiro Shintani. Horiuchi designed several covers for Olive, as well as its logo. Olive's tagline was 'Magazine for City Girls', and was originally targeted at university-aged women. It also initially took inspiration from American fashion and culture, in a similar manner to Popeye.

In 1983, Yoshihiro Ebina became editor-in-chief of Olive, and established what came to be Olive's signature style. The magazine's content drew inspiration from French culture, particularly the fashion trends and lifestyles of "lycéenne" (high school) girls in France. Female readers who followed the fashion trends covered by the magazine became known as 'Olive Girls'. The 'Olive Girl' style was characterized by feminine, layered outfits, often inspired by a romanticized view of western European culture. Olive changed its tagline to 'Magazine for Romantic Girls' in 1983.

Miyoko Yodogawa became editor-in-chief in 1984, and Olive continued to rise in popularity. Celebrity idol singers such as Kyoko Koizumi and Momoko Kikuchi were featured. Olive, under Yodogawa, became known for promoting independence and individuality among young women, while maintaining a sense of femininity and 'kawaii' style. In January 1985, Olive published an article entitled A Career Guide for Olive Girls, detailing a more career-orientated path for girls, preceding the enactment of the Equal Employment Opportunity Law in Japan in May 1985. Olive's circulation reached over 470,000 copies in 1985.

Olive continued publication through the 1990s, but faced decline in the early 2000s. The final issue of Olive was released in August 2003. Junko Sakai, who wrote for Olive under the pen name Margaret Sakai, attributed Olive's decline to the rise in gyaru culture in the late 1990s and early 2000s.

Editors-in-chief
Name	Tenure
Yamato Shiine	1981–1983
Yoshihiro Ebina	1983–1984
Miyoko Yodogawa	1984–1987
Izumi Shinoda	1987–1991
Kozue Toyama	1991–1997
Kinue Okado	1997–1999

== Legacy ==
Olive has seen continued retrospective interest since its discontinuation in 2003. An exhibition of back issues of Olive was held from 25 February to 1 July at the 21st Century Museum of Contemporary Art, Kanazawa, in 2012. The exhibition included live talks from former Olive editors Kozue Toyama and Kinue Okado.

In June 2014, Ginza magazine included a section on the history and cultural impact of Olive. On 12 March 2015, Olive returned as a one-time supplement of Ginza magazine following a rise in interest after the June issue.

On 31 March 2020, An An magazine published a one-time new issue of Olive, featuring singer and actress Yurina Hirate on the cover. An alternative cover featured idol group Bi Shonen.
