= Heibon Punch =

Japanese men's magazine

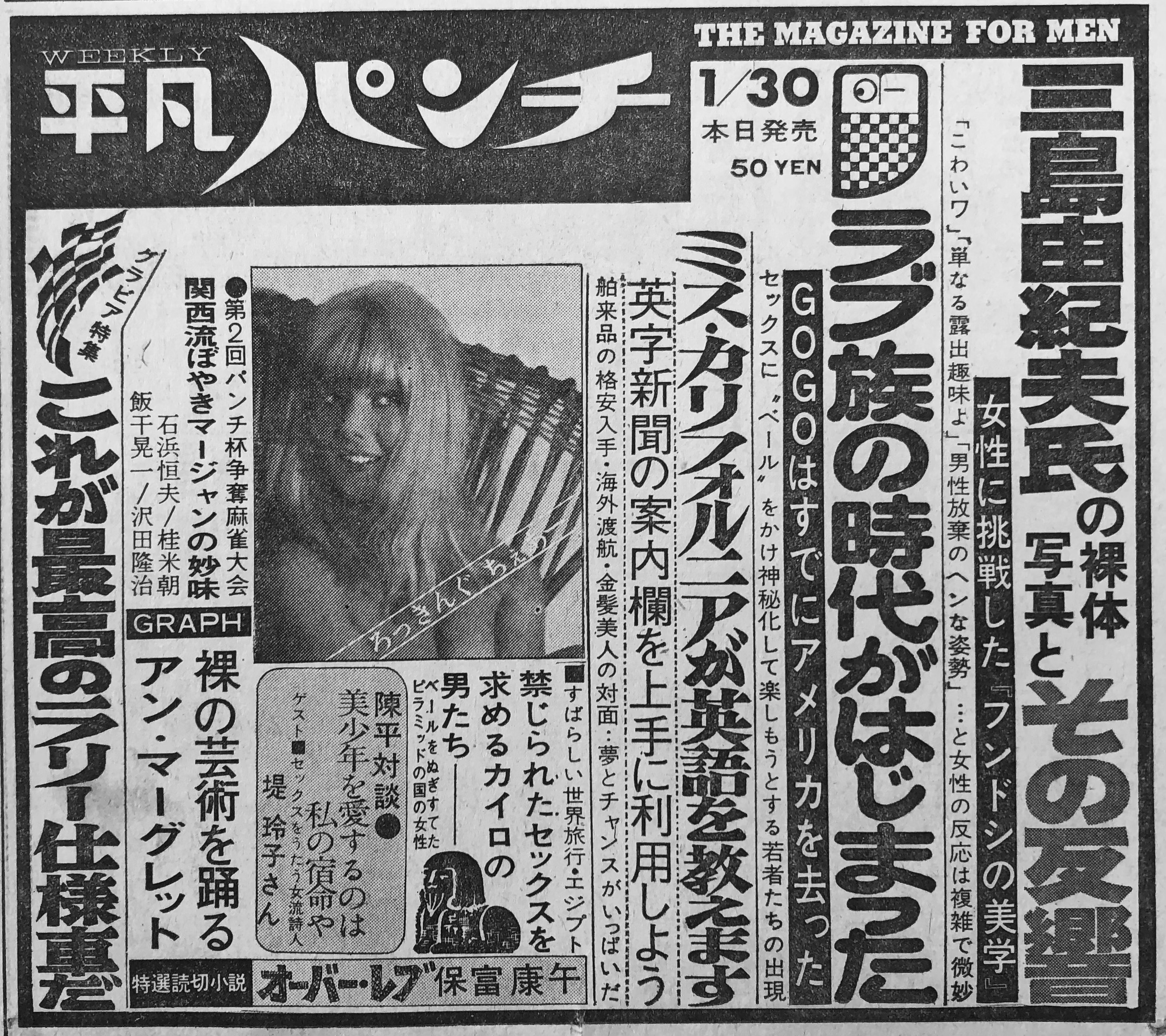
- Categories: Men's magazine
- Frequency: Weekly
- Publisher: Heibon Shuppan / Magazine House
- First issue: 1964
- Final issue: 1988
- Country: Japan
- Based in: Tokyo
- Language: Japanese

Heibon Punch (平凡パンチ, Heibon Panchi) was a weekly Japanese men's magazine published by Heibon Shuppan (currently known as Magazine House). It was first published on 28 April 1964, and continued until 1988.

== Content and influence ==
The magazine featured articles on lifestyle, fashion, sports, political issues, and sex, rivaling with Weekly Playboy, launched two years later. Heibon Punch was influential in promoting American fashion trends, such as the Ivy look, to Japanese male youth in post-World War II Japan.

== Notable contributors ==
Some of Heibon Punch's collaborators were Yukio Mishima, Toshio Saeki, and Kyoko Okazaki.

== Related publications ==
Other magazines by the same publisher were Monthly Heibon Punch, the general weekly magazine Weekly Heibon, and the spin-off Heibon Punch for Girls (precursor to an an).
