= Windswept Adan =

2020 studio album by Ichiko Aoba

- Standard edition cover

Studio album by Ichiko Aoba
- Released: 2 December 2020
- Recorded: July–October 2020
- Studio: Studio ATLIO (Setagaya, Tokyo); Victor Studio (Shibuya); Saidera Mastering (Shibuya)
- Genre: Folk baroque; psychedelic folk
- Length: 49:55
- Language: Japanese
- Label: Hermine
- Producer: Ichiko Aoba; Taro Umebayashi

Ichiko Aoba chronology
"Gift" at Sogetsu Hall (2020)	Windswept Adan (2020)	Amiko (Original Soundtrack) (2022)

Singles from Windswept Adan
- 1. "Porcelain" Released: 30 October 2020

Windswept Adan (Japanese: アダンの風, Hepburn: Adan no Kaze) is the seventh studio album by Japanese singer-songwriter Ichiko Aoba, released on 2 December 2020 by her label, Hermine. Conceived as a soundtrack for an imaginary film based on a narrative written by Aoba, the concept album follows the story of a young girl who is sent away by her family to the titular fictional island of Adan. Aoba and composer Taro Umebayashi wrote, composed, arranged, and produced the music for the album throughout 2020. Initial development began in January, while recording and mastering sessions were held from July to October. The album was preceded by one single, "Porcelain", which was released on 30 October 2020.

Windswept Adan is a folk baroque and psychedelic folk album with elements of jazz, classical, and ambient music. It marks a departure from Aoba's earlier minimalist instrumentation, drawing inspiration from diverse music traditions and featuring a variety of instruments and sounds, including a celesta, wind chimes, string arrangements, and field recordings taken by Aoba during her trips to the Ryukyu Islands. The album includes instrumental, a cappella, and vocal performances, some of which contain only non-lyrical vocalizations.

Windswept Adan received widespread critical acclaim, with praise for its arrangements, instrumentation, and worldbuilding. Upon its release, the album debuted at number 82 on the Billboard Japan Hot Albums chart and number 88 on the Oricon Albums Chart. It was promoted in Japan with concerts and alternate versions, including a live album and a three-track single with acoustic renditions of selected songs. It received an international vinyl release on 19 November 2021, the first time one of Aoba's albums was reissued outside of Japan. To further support the album in global markets, Aoba embarked on her first international tour, performing in the United Kingdom, continental Europe, and North America between August and October 2022.

== Background ==
After the release of her debut album Kamisori Otome (剃刀乙女) in 2010, Ichiko Aoba had built an audience in her native Japan, but her work remained obscure abroad. However, following the release of her sixth studio album, Qp, in 2018, Aoba began drawing attention from international listeners and media outlets. Qp was received positively by both critics and listeners outside of Japan and was ranked among the top albums of 2018 on the online music community Rate Your Music. The album's popularity brought new listeners to Aoba's previous releases, leading her 2013 album 0 to be retroactively ranked as the top album of its year on Rate Your Music. On 10 January 2020, Aoba announced the establishment of her record label, Hermine, alongside the release of two songs titled "Amuletum" (守り哥, Mamori Uta; lit. 'Guardian Song') and "Bouquet" as a double A-side single.

== Development ==
=== Writing ===
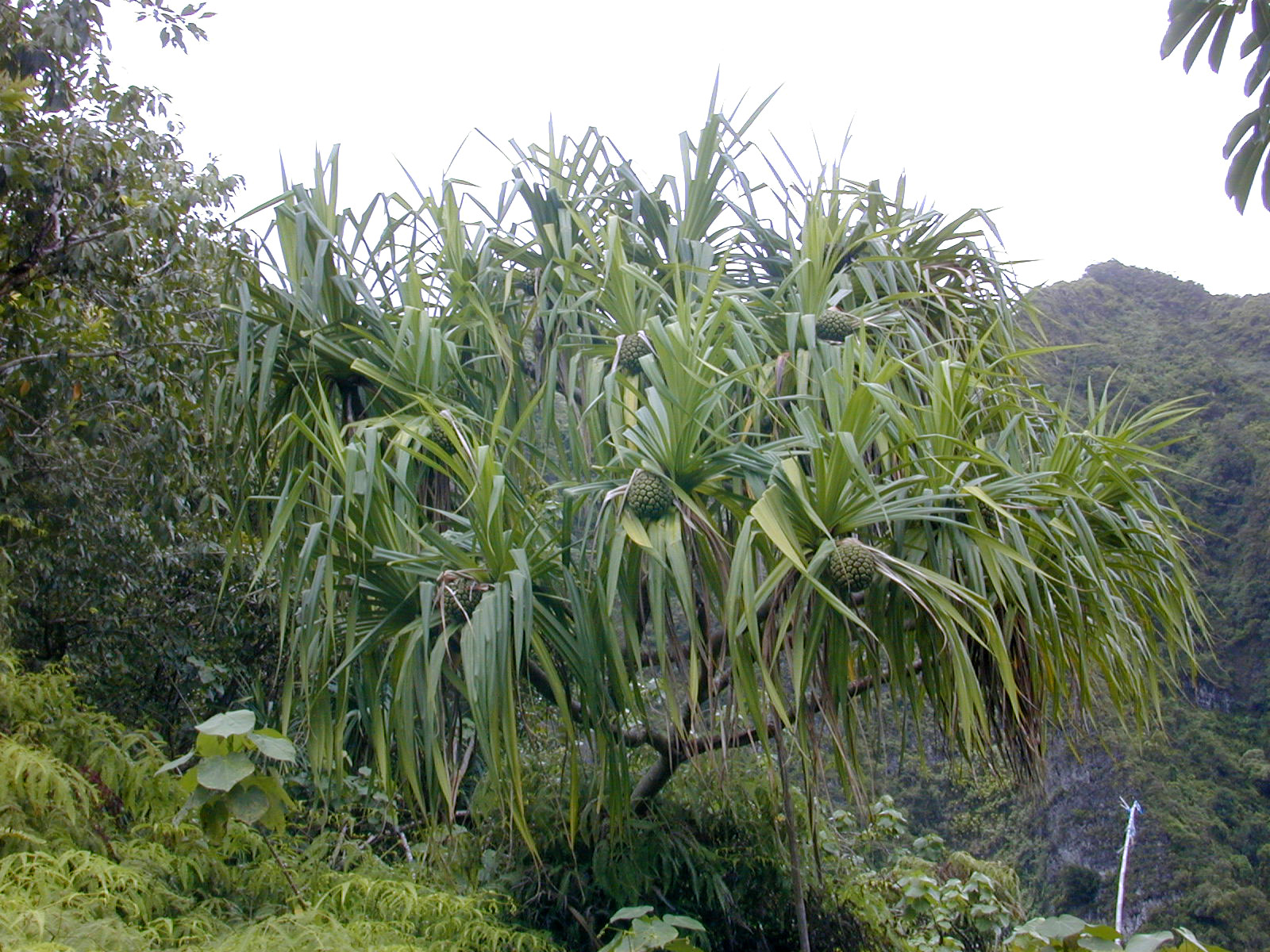
The Pandanus tectorius trees on Zamami Island inspired the title for Windswept Adan.

Aoba first conceptualized Windswept Adan as a story while on a trip to the islands of Okinawa, Zamami, and Kudaka with photographer Kodai Kobayashi in January 2020. The title originated from a conversation between Aoba and Kobayashi during a drive on Zamami, in which Kobayashi noted the Pandanus tectorius trees (Note: In Japan, Pandanus tectorius is called the adan tree.) on the island. Aoba stated that the story for the album came to her in an epiphany she had at an izakaya in Naha; after noticing the translucency of a sea grape, she wrote the sentence "there were no words on the island" in her notebook, and soon began outlining a plot. Between March and September 2020, Aoba made several subsequent trips to the Ryukyu Islands, visiting Amami Ōshima, Kakeroma, and Ishigaki. She researched various aspects of Ryukyuan culture and history, including festivals held on remote islands; the noro and yuta figures of Ryukyuan religion; the region's geography, demographics, weather, and marine life; and the topics of plant breeding and plankton. Aoba completed the final draft for the story of Windswept Adan in October 2020, during the album's mastering stage. A companion book containing Aoba's writings, sketches, and photographs was released to supplement the album.

The narrative follows a young girl with prophetic powers from a village of inbred families on the fictional remote island of Kirinaki, who is exiled by her family to the island Adan to preserve her bloodline while preventing her from participating in intermarriage. Aoba depicts the imaginary Adan as flourishing with diverse plant and animal life (such as Risso's dolphins, bougainvillea, and Easter lilies) and inhabited by creatures of an unspecified species that communicate using seashells in place of a spoken language. The creatures of Adan celebrate the girl's arrival with a festival, and soon after die due to their brief lifespans. After falling asleep under a tree and awakening to a group of creatures rising into the air, the girl also dies and is reincarnated as a number of different life forms.

=== Production ===
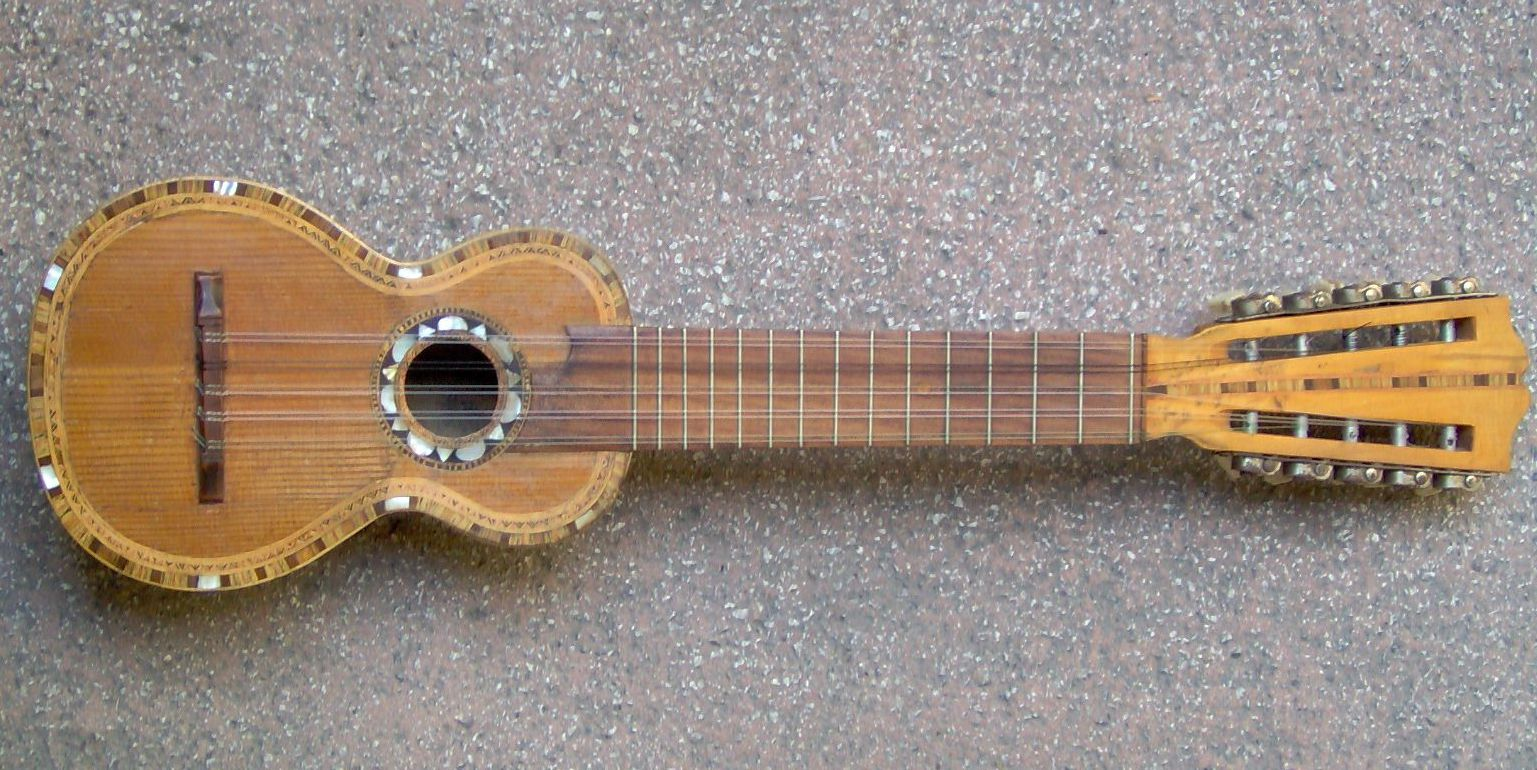
Composer Taro Umebayashi played the charango on the song "Pilgrimage".

All of the lyrics on Windswept Adan were written by Aoba, while composition, arrangement, and production were largely handled by Aoba and composer Taro Umebayashi, with whom she had previously collaborated on "Amuletum". According to Aoba, the album began development during her first trip to Okinawa in January 2020; a snippet of the track "Pilgrimage" was the first demo that she received from Umebayashi. Recording sessions began in July, and the final mastering stage ended in mid-October. Aoba described the production process as unconventional, with composing, recording, and mixing being done concurrently rather than sequentially. She likened the experience to working on a ship:

It wasn't like a musician creates the song, an engineer records it, and a photographer shoots the package. It was more like someone with a compass, someone steering, someone fishing for meals, and someone reading the wind—all working together on the same ship.

— Ichiko Aoba, 2020

Contrary to Aoba's earlier works, which had been characterized by their minimalist guitar and vocal arrangements, Windswept Adan features an array of different instruments, including woodwind, keyboard, and string instruments. Aoba and Umebayashi enlisted the help of several musicians, including flautist Junichiro Taku, percussionist Manami Kakudo, and the string quintet Phonolite Strings, for accompaniment on the album. Windswept Adan also contains samples of field recordings taken by Aoba at various locations around Amami Ōshima.

While composing for Windswept Adan, Umebayashi worked closely with Aoba as she wrote her story. He recorded demos inspired by Aoba's ideas, which she periodically shared with him as the plot developed; the demos would then shape the direction of Aoba's subsequent writing. Umebayashi sought to reflect the mythological themes and the setting of Aoba's narrative in the sound of the album, as well as create an intentionally vague impression of the music's cultural origin. On the song "Easter Lily", he plays the celesta, an instrument he believed suited Aoba's vocals and the atmosphere of the story; a prepared piano with a felt covering was featured in the recording of "Parfum d'étoiles" for the same reason. For the song "Pilgrimage", he used the charango, a lute-like instrument traditionally used in South America, to create a foreign feeling for the track. According to Umebayashi, the song "Porcelain" includes a single electric guitar in order to "incorporate the idea of expressing color"; during its production, he examined photos that Kobayashi had sent to him and contemplated which sounds best matched the colors in the images. He also consulted Aoba to determine how the instruments should be played on the track and focused on ensuring that its dynamic level was appropriate for her vocals. Both Umebayashi and Aoba have said that they were inspired by musical traditions and cultures from around the world while writing and composing for Windswept Adan, adapting scales from Ryukyuan music and experimenting with sounds from shima-uta and Bulgarian folk music, particularly the style of the Bulgarian Voices.

== Composition ==
Windswept Adan is a concept album inspired by Aoba's narrative; she has described it as the soundtrack to a fictional film. Critics have generally labeled the album as chamber folk and psychedelic folk, but some have also described it as including elements from jazz, classical, and ambient music. Some reviewers have stated that Windswept Adan represents a stylistic departure from the minimalist instrumentation featured on Aoba's earlier projects, such as Qp. Its atmosphere has often been called "ghostly" and "serene".

Critics have made comparisons between Windswept Adan and the works of artists across various musical genres, ranging from art pop to contemporary classical. The album's composition has commonly been analogized to those by composers Erik Satie and Philip Glass. David Honigmann of the Financial Times deemed it a successor to Akiko Yano's 1982 album Ai Ga Nakucha Ne (愛がなくちゃね, You've Got to Have Love, You Know) and likened the songs "Horo" and "Ohayashi" to the works of Penguin Cafe Orchestra and Steve Reich, respectively. The Observer's Emily Mackay noted similarities to the music of Nick Drake, Joanna Newsom, and Isobel Campbell's The Gentle Waves project. Brendan Mattox of Bandcamp Daily compared the album's arrangements to Mark Mothersbaugh's scores for the films of Wes Anderson and the works of composer Jherek Bischoff. Other artists whose works have been compared to Windswept Adan include Nusrat Fateh Ali Khan, Astrud Gilberto, and Kate Bush.

=== Songs ===
"Parfum d'étoiles"
The sixth track on Windswept Adan. "Parfum d'étoiles" contains soft vocalizations from Aoba, a prepared piano performance by Umebayashi, and a field recording of bird calls. Beats Per Minute's Chase McMullen described it as a "simplistic piano ballad" that contributes to the "ghostly and serene" atmosphere of the album.

The opening song "Prologue" features an organ, choral vocals, wind chimes, and samples from a field recording of waves crashing taken by Aoba on Honohoshi Beach in Amami Ōshima. Honigmann described the track as "a lazy, persistent wash of surf, tiny bells, [and] a speechless vocal that could be the voice of a breeze." The song "Pilgrimage" consists of Aoba vocalizing in an invented language over a repeated harp melody, arpeggiated flutes, and a charango. Stephen Dalton of Uncut likened its sound to that of a music box. Inspired by the concept of musically depicting the weather of the Kerama Islands, the single "Porcelain" is considered one of the densest tracks on Windswept Adan, and features orchestral arrangements of strings, woodwinds, and percussion and lyrics about the landscape of Adan. Honigmann compared it to the orientalist arrangements of Maurice Ravel, while Pitchfork's Shy Thompson described its composition as consisting of softer individual parts that coalesce into "a tumultuous storm." The song "Horo" (帆衣, Hoi; lit. 'Sail Clothing') includes improvised vocals accompanied by an accordion; (Note: Honigmann incorrectly labeled the instrument on "Horo" as a harmonium; however, Umebayashi has confirmed in an interview that the instrument is an accordion belonging to Aoba. The liner notes for Windswept Adan confirm this as well.) Mattox compared Aoba's singing on the track to birdsong. "Easter Lily", named after the flower native to the Ryukyu Islands, contains two layered vocal melodies sung alongside a celesta and guitar. Honigmann characterized Aoba's backing vocal performance on "Easter Lily" as a mumbled haiku.

"Parfum d'étoiles" features Aoba quietly vocalizing over a prepared piano played by Umebayashi. A field recording of the calls of Amami jays taken by Aoba at a church in Tatsugō, Kagoshima, can be heard in the background. Thompson described "Parfum d'étoiles" as "an almost improvised sounding piano number", and observed that the sound of the piano's hammers striking its strings could be heard with each keystroke. Honigmann noted similarities between Umebayashi's arrangement and the works of Erik Satie, and characterized the song's piano performance as "moody [and] unresolved". "Kirinakijima" (霧鳴島, Kirinaki Island) is an a cappella song with two vocal harmonies layered over each other, and is titled after the home island of the story's protagonist. "Sagu Palm's Song" is about the titular Japanese sago palm and contains minimal instrumentation, featuring only Aoba's vocals and a guitalele. Thompson highlighted the shift in composition relative to the preceding songs, commenting that Aoba sounded particularly isolated on the track.

"Red Silence"

blood, blood,
through sickness
through thunder
through darkness
find your way

beloved dream, beloved dream
take shelter in the glowing flowers

— Ichiko Aoba, "Dreams and Visions" Companion Book

The ambient track "Chinuhaji" functions as an interlude to the following "Red Silence" (血の風, Chi no Kaze; lit. 'Wind of Blood'). The lyrics of "Red Silence" are an adaptation of a healing spell found in the 1925 book Shima no Hanashi (シマの話, Island Stories) by Okinawan folklorist Koei Sakima and are sung in Okinawan Japanese. Aoba incorporated the words of the spell into the song's lyrics, hoping that they would resonate with listeners in modern times. Dalton called "Red Silence" a "breathy, pared-down, late-night jazzy chanson" alongside "Hagupit" (Tagalog for "repeated whipping"), which shares its name with the typhoon of the same name that Aoba experienced during her visit to the Yaeyama Islands in August 2020. "Hagupit" features Aoba singing with accompaniment from the string quintet Phonolite Strings; Mackay called it "an eerier, ghostlier thing with a keening melody." The song "Dawn in the Adan" contains performances from Junichiro Taku and Phonolite Strings; its lyrics are inspired by the continuity of life from the distant past, Aoba's reflections on the origins of sadness and pain, and the concept of a singular, encompassing life force. "Ohayashi" is characterized by abrupt shifts and gamelan-style percussion performed by Manami Kakudo and employs polyrhythmic techniques—the song's guitar riff is written in quintuple meter. The six-minute closing track "Luminescent Creatures" (アダンの島の誕生祭, Adan no Shima no Tanjōsai; lit. 'Birth Festival of Adan Island') begins with Aoba singing over a lightly strummed guitar and gradually builds into an orchestral piece with cello and flute before fading into the sound of waves on the shore. The literal title of the song, "Birth Festival of Adan Island", is intended to symbolize the idea of rebirth. Loud and Quiet's Charlotte Marston described the song as "long, still beats filling in the gaps between creamy flecks of guitar and velveteen vocals." Mattox commented that Aoba's singing on the track conveyed the fragility of the story's young protagonist.

== Release and promotion ==
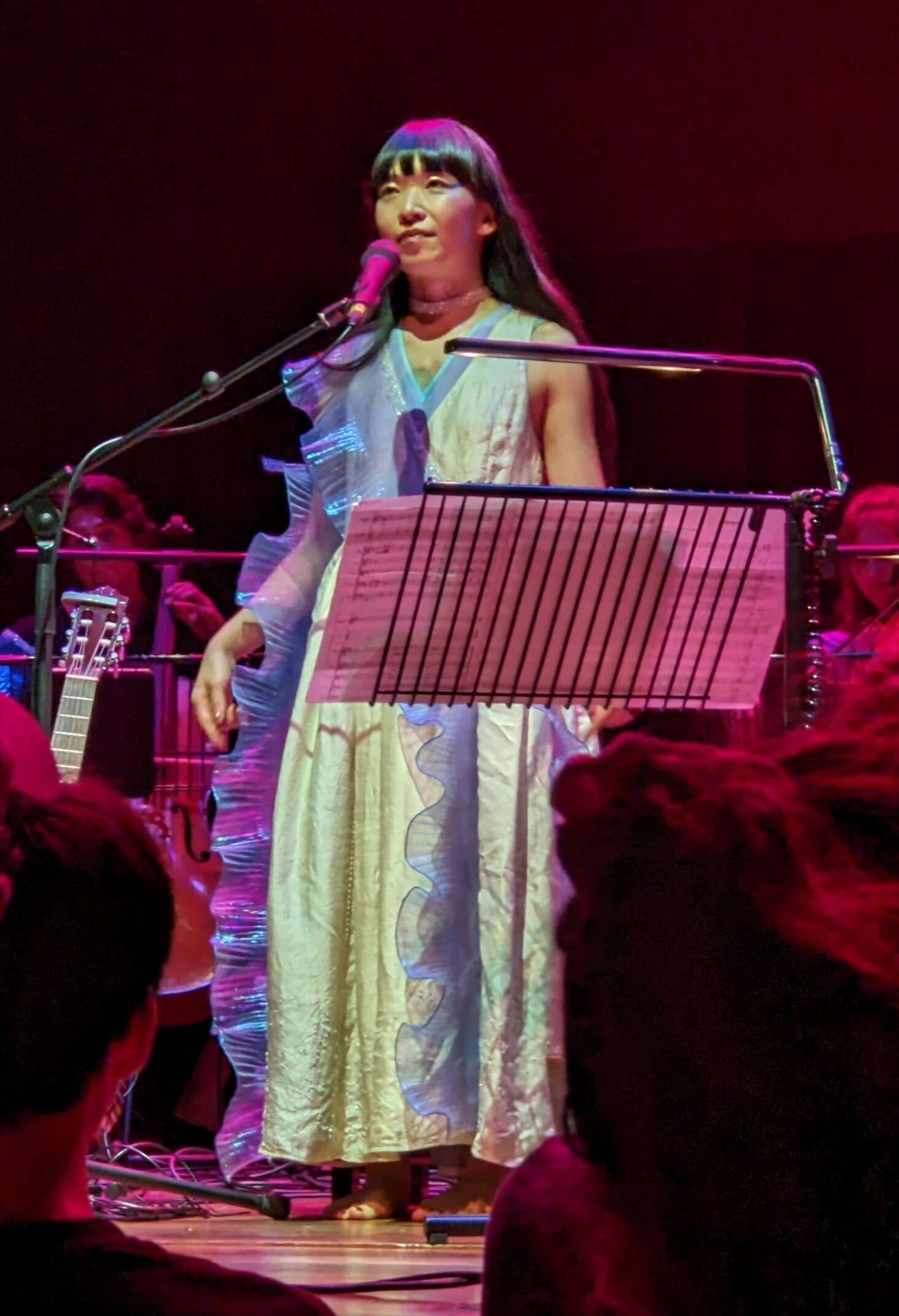
Aoba performing at Milton Court in London on 3 September 2022

On 30 October 2020, Aoba announced that she would release Windswept Adan in December. She debuted the album's only single, "Porcelain", along with an accompanying music video directed by Kodai Kobayashi, on the same day. Even though Aoba had previously received international media coverage for her 2018 album Qp, the release of "Porcelain" was viewed as her first intentional effort to appeal to global audiences, with Beats Per Minute's Rob Hakimian noting its English-language title and the inclusion of an image of Aoba on the single's cover art. Windswept Adan was released for streaming and digital download by Aoba's record label, Hermine, on 2 December 2020. Upon its release, the album debuted at number 82 on the Billboard Japan Hot Albums chart, where it remained for a week, and at number 88 on the Oricon Albums Chart, where it remained for two weeks.

In Japan, Windswept Adan was promoted with concerts, events, and re-recordings. On the day of its release, Aoba performed the album via livestream from the Hara Museum of Contemporary Art in Shinagawa, Tokyo. She announced that an exhibition featuring her sketches, writings, voice memos, and seashell instruments used for the album would be held at Tsutaya Books Daikanyama in Shibuya, Tokyo, from 4 December to 27 December 2020. She later announced that another livestream performance would be held at Tsutaya Books on 29 January 2021. On 16 June 2021, a three-track single titled "Windswept Adan Roots" was released, featuring re-recorded acoustic versions of "Easter Lily", "Porcelain", and "Dawn in the Adan". On 21 June, Aoba, Umebayashi, and other musicians featured on Windswept Adan performed an orchestral arrangement of the album, along with arrangements of "Amuletum" and "Seabed Eden" (海底のエデン, Kaitei no Eden), at a commemorative concert at the Bunkamura Orchard Hall in Shibuya; the event was hosted for a live audience and broadcast online. Double 12-inch vinyl sets of Windswept Adan were made available for purchase in Japan on 7 July 2021; following the reissue, the album made another appearance on Japanese charts, reaching its peak on the Oricon Albums Chart at number 63 and the Billboard Japan Top Album Sales chart at number 43 with an estimated 1,905 total copies sold. A live recording of the Bunkamura concert titled "Windswept Adan" Concert at Bunkamura Orchard Hall (Live) was released on 18 August 2021.

=== Cover artwork ===
The front cover features a photograph taken by Kodai Kobayashi, which depicts Aoba swimming nude underwater. Seika Yajima of An An described the cover as evoking "the mystery and dynamism of life". The photograph was taken in the waters surrounding Ishigaki Island in the Yaeyama Islands during the production of "Choe", a serialized photo essay about Aoba's time in the Ryukyu Islands that was featured in the Japanese magazine &Premium. Kobayashi had previously taken the photographs for the cover art and booklet of the 2018 extended play "Karakai to Amaneki" by Aoba and producer Sweet William; he later served as the primary photographer and art director for Windswept Adan.

=== International vinyl release and tour ===
On 19 November 2021, Ba Da Bing Records released vinyl copies of Windswept Adan in the United States, United Kingdom, and Europe, nearly a year after its initial launch. The release marked the first time that any of Aoba's albums were reissued internationally. In June 2022, Aoba announced her first international tour in support of the album, with planned shows in Europe and North America. The tour commenced with its European leg on 20 August with a performance at the Green Man Festival in Wales. Aoba played subsequent shows in cities across the United Kingdom and continental Europe, including Glasgow, London, Copenhagen, Munich, and Berlin. The leg concluded with a concert in Stuttgart on 11 September. The North American leg of the tour began at the Masonic Lodge at Hollywood Forever Cemetery in Los Angeles on 14 October and ended with a show in Philadelphia on 28 October.

== Critical reception ==
Professional ratings
Aggregate scores
Source	Rating
Metacritic	82/100
Review scores
Source	Rating
Beats Per Minute	88%
Financial Times	4/5 stars
Loud and Quiet	7/10
Mojo	4/5 stars
The Observer	3/5 stars
Pitchfork	8.0/10
Uncut	8/10

Windswept Adan was met with widespread critical acclaim. At Metacritic, which assigns a normalized rating out of 100 to reviews from professional publications, the album received an average score of 82, based on 6 reviews.

Several reviewers praised the worldbuilding and atmosphere of Windswept Adan. Beats Per Minute's chief editor Chase McMullen considered it to be her most ambitious effort yet, describing the album as "an aquatic world to be lost within" and citing the songs "Parfum d'étoiles", "Kirinakijima", and "Chinuhaji" as contributors to the album's ethereal feeling. Financial Times' David Honigmann commended its narrative and highlighted "Easter Lily" as the point at which the album's elements came together most effectively. Emily Mackay of The Observer lauded Aoba's storytelling and complimented the gentle compositions of "Prologue" and "Luminescent Creatures", while Mojo's Andy Cowan said that Aoba's performances and orchestration on the album made for an immersive and calming listening experience.

Critics also underscored the album's production and stylistic range, with many framing it in relation to Aoba's past works. In a review for Pitchfork, Shy Thompson wrote that on the album, Aoba had embraced a wide range of sounds while retaining the sentimental and imaginative qualities that had defined her previous works. Loud and Quiet's Charlotte Marston welcomed the album's change of pace, commenting that its diverse instrumentation gave it more complexity than the rest of Aoba's discography and highlighted the first three tracks, "Prologue", "Pilgrimage", and "Porcelain", as indicative of a transition in her musical style. In Uncut, Stephen Dalton appraised it as exceptionally well-crafted and wrote that its blend of nostalgic influences with modern ambient sounds was executed smoothly. The Guardian writer John Lewis said that on Windswept Adan, Aoba was able to emulate the style of other artists while remaining distinct in her creative approach.

Windswept Adan was featured on Beats Per Minute's list of the top 50 albums of 2020, ranking at number 18. The album was ranked fifth on The Guardian's list of the top 10 best contemporary albums of 2021.

== Track listing ==
All lyrics are written by Ichiko Aoba. All songs on the original release are produced by Aoba and Taro Umebayashi. All songs on the "Roots" edition are covers performed by Aoba. All arrangements for the live edition of Windswept Adan are by Umebayashi.

Windswept Adan track listing (Note: Titles adapted from Bandcamp and Tower Records Japan.)
No.	Title	Music	Arrangement	Length
1.	"Prologue"	Ichiko Aoba	Aoba	4:55
2.	"Pilgrimage"	Taro Umebayashi	Umebayashi	3:48
3.	"Porcelain"	Umebayashi	Umebayashi	4:29
4.	"Horo (帆衣, Hoi; lit. 'Sail Clothing')"	Aoba	Aoba	1:58
5.	"Easter Lily"	Umebayashi	Umebayashi	3:16
6.	"Parfum d'etoiles"	Umebayashi	Umebayashi	2:52
7.	"Kirinakijima (霧鳴島, Kirinaki Island)"	Aoba	Aoba	1:27
8.	"Sagu Palm's Song"	Aoba	Aoba	3:57
9.	"Chinuhaji"	Umebayashi	Umebayashi	1:52
10.	"Red Silence (血の風, Chi no Kaze; lit. 'Wind of Blood')"	Umebayashi	Umebayashi	3:47
11.	"Hagupit"	Aoba; Umebayashi	Umebayashi	2:58
12.	"Dawn in the Adan"	Umebayashi	Umebayashi	4:45
13.	"Ohayashi"	Aoba; Umebayashi	Aoba; Umebayashi; Manami Kakudo	3:44
14.	"Luminescent Creatures (アダンの島の誕生祭, Adan no Shima no Tanjōsai; lit. 'Birth Festival of Adan Island')"	Aoba	Umebayashi	6:07
Total length:				49:55

Windswept Adan Roots track listing
No.	Title	Length
1.	"Easter Lily" (Roots version)	3:38
2.	"Porcelain" (Roots version)	5:26
3.	"Dawn in the Adan" (Roots version)	5:42
Total length:		14:47

"Windswept Adan" Concert at Bunkamura Orchard Hall (Live) track listing
No.	Title	Length
1.	"Prologue" (Live)	6:16
2.	"Pilgrimage" (Live)	3:54
3.	"Porcelain" (Live)	5:27
4.	"Horo" (Live)	1:03
5.	"Easter Lily" (Live)	3:33
6.	"Parfum d'etoiles" (Live)	2:45
7.	"Kirinakijima" (Live)	1:57
8.	"Sagu Palm's Song" (Live)	3:57
9.	"Chinuhaji" (Live)	1:58
10.	"Red Silence" (Live)	3:50
11.	"Hagupit" (Live)	3:09
12.	"Dawn in the Adan" (Live)	5:17
13.	"Ohayashi" (Live)	4:30
14.	"Luminescent Creatures" (Live)	10:25
15.	"Amuletum" (Live)	7:20
16.	"Seabed Eden" (Live)	4:55
Total length:		1:10:26

Notes

- On the original release on streaming platforms, tracks 4, 7, 9, and 14 appear under their romanized Japanese titles. On Bandcamp, track 4 is stylized in all caps. On Amazon Music, Bandcamp, Spotify, and Tidal, tracks 9 and 13 are stylized in all lowercase.

== Personnel ==
Credits are adapted from the liner notes of Windswept Adan.

Recording locations

- Recorded and mixed at Studio ATLIO (Setagaya, Tokyo) (tracks 5, 6, 7 [chorus], and 12) and Victor Studio (Shibuya) (tracks 1–4, 7 [all except chorus], 8–11, 13, and 14)
- Engineered at Victor Studio
- Mastered at Saidera Mastering (Shibuya)
- Management and publishing — Piano Inc.

Musicians

- Ichiko Aoba – vocals, classical guitar, guitalele, accordion, organ, chimes, field recording, production (Note: Organ is listed as "Ka na ta Organ", and chimes are listed as "Steiner Chime". "Heart Beat" also appears as an instrument.)
- Taro Umebayashi – acoustic piano, Rhodes piano, celesta, kalimba, synthesizer, electric guitar, charango (tracks 2, 3, 5, 6, 12, and 13), production
- Junichiro Taku – flute, alto flute, piccolo (tracks 2, 3, 12, and 14)
- Tomoyuki Asakawa – harp (tracks 2 and 3)
- Manami Kakudo – percussion (tracks 2, 3, and 13)
- Phonolite Strings (tracks 2, 3, 5, 11, 12, and 14)
  - Yuko Kajitani – first violin
  - Asano Mekaru – second violin
  - Anzu Suhara – viola
  - Orie Hirayama – cello
  - Hiroaki Mizutani – contrabass

Technical

- Toshihiko Kasai – recording, mixing
- Tomomi Baba – additional engineering
- Takuma Kase – additional engineering
- Shunsuke Miyazawa – additional engineering
- Reina Ohki – additional engineering
- Arou Yamauchi – additional engineering
- Seigen Ono – mastering
- Hikari Machiguchi – design
- Kodai Kobayashi – art direction, photography
- Masaki Munakata – promotion
- Hiroyasu Hirakawa – public relations
- Kimi Yokoyama – costume
- Takashi Watanabe – project design

== Charts ==
2020 chart performance for Windswept Adan
Chart (2020)	Peak position
Japan Hot Albums (Billboard Japan)	82
Japan Top Albums Sales (Billboard Japan)	73
Japanese Albums (Oricon)	88

2021 chart performance for Windswept Adan
Chart (2021)	Peak position
Japan Top Albums Sales (Billboard Japan)	43
Japanese Albums (Oricon)	63

== Release history ==
Release dates and format(s) for Windswept Adan
Region	Date	Edition(s)	Format(s)	Label	Ref.
Various	2 December 2020	Standard	Streaming; digital download	Hermine	
Various	16 June 2021	Roots edition	Streaming; digital download	Hermine	
Japan	7 July 2021	Standard	Vinyl record	Hermine	
Various	18 August 2021	Live edition	Streaming; digital download	Hermine	
Various	19 November 2021	Standard	Vinyl record	Ba Da Bing	

== Bibliography ==
=== Primary sources ===
- Aoba, Ichiko (20 October 2021). Windswept Adan "Dreams and Visions" Companion Book. Translated by Dorfman, Jason Erik. Adan Shobo. ISBN 978-4-9907072-4-8.
- Hashimoto, Tomofumi (21 February 2021). "Ichiko Aoba, Taro Umebayashi, and Kodai Kobayashi Discuss Windswept Adan". Tokion. Translated by Seda, Lena Grace. Ichiko Aoba, Kodai Kobayashi, Taro Umebayashi (interviewees). INFAS Publications. Archived from the original on 6 January 2024.
- Murao, Yasuo (30 December 2020). 青葉市子「アダンの風」ロング・インタビュー 島々を巡って紡いだ物語から、時空を繋ぐ音楽が生まれるまで [Ichiko Aoba "Windswept Adan" Long Interview: From the Stories Spun Across the Islands to the Birth of Music Connecting Time and Space]. Mikiki (in Japanese). Ichiko Aoba (interviewee). Tower Records Japan. Archived from the original on 24 September 2023.
- Oishi, Hajime (5 January 2021). 自分の心の奥へと航海してゆく、そのサウンドトラック──青葉市子「アダンの風」 [A Journey into the Depths of One's Own Heart: The Soundtrack of Ichiko Aoba's "Windswept Adan"]. Ototoy (in Japanese). Ichiko Aoba (interviewee). Archived from the original on 2 June 2023.
- Watanabe, Katsumi (1 December 2020). "青葉市子と小林光大が、南の島で紡いだ物語" [A Story Woven by Ichiko Aoba and Kodai Kobayashi on a Southern Island]. Brutus. Ichiko Aoba, Kodai Kobayashi (interviewees). Magazine House. Archived from the original on 16 May 2021.
- Yajima, Seika (4 January 2021). "沖縄の島旅から生まれた新アルバム 青葉市子「頭の中の楽想を具現化できた一枚」" [A New Album Inspired by a Journey to the Islands of Okinawa: Ichiko Aoba "An Album That Brought the Musical Ideas in My Mind to Life"]. An An. Ichiko Aoba (interviewee). Magazine House. Archived from the original on 29 May 2023.
- Yamamoto, Shoichi (26 January 2021). 青葉市子が「アダンの風」で見つめた、時代のざわめきの向こう側 [Ichiko Aoba's "Windswept Adan": Gazing Beyond the Murmurs of the Era] (in Japanese). Masato Matsumura (interviewer), Ichiko Aoba, Taro Umebayashi (interviewees). Cinra. Archived from the original on 30 May 2023.
- Yamamoto, Shoichi (9 February 2021). 青葉市子「アダンの風」全曲解説.作曲家・梅林太郎と共に語る [Ichiko Aoba's "Windswept Adan": A Track-by-Track Commentary with Composer Taro Umebayashi] (in Japanese). Masato Matsumura (interviewer), Ichiko Aoba, Taro Umebayashi (interviewees). Cinra. Archived from the original on 29 September 2023.

=== Secondary sources ===
- Anon.[a] (9 December 2020). "Billboard Japan Hot Albums". Billboard Japan (in Japanese). Archived from the original on 10 October 2023.
- Anon.[b] (9 December 2020). "Billboard Japan Top Albums Sales". Billboard Japan (in Japanese). Archived from the original on 28 June 2023.
- Anon. (14 July 2021). "Billboard Japan Top Albums Sales". Billboard Japan (in Japanese). Archived from the original on 26 June 2023.
- Anon.[a] (n.d.). "Windswept Adan by Ichiko Aoba". Metacritic. Archived from the original on 24 December 2021.
- Anon.[b] (n.d.). "Windswept Adan on Bandcamp". Bandcamp. Archived from the original on 15 January 2024.
- Anon.[c] (n.d.). 青葉市子/アダンの風 [Ichiko Aoba / Windswept Adan]. tower.jp. Tower Records Japan. Archived from the original on 9 July 2021.
- Anon.[d] (n.d.). "Ichiko Aoba". Ba Da Bing Records. Archived from the original on 19 May 2024.
- Anon.[e] (n.d.). "Adan No Kaze Ichiko Aoba Vinyl (LP)". CDJapan. Archived from the original on 18 June 2021.
- Anon.[f] (n.d.). "Windswept Adan on Apple Music". Apple Music.
- Anon.[g] (n.d.). ""Windswept Adan" Concert at Bunkamura Orchard Hall (Live) on Apple Music". Apple Music.
- Anon.[h] (n.d.). "「アダンの風」(海外アナログ盤)" [Windswept Adan (Overseas Vinyl Edition)]. ICHIKO AOBA WEB SHOP (in Japanese). Archived from the original on 19 May 2024.
- Anon.[i] (n.d.). "Windswept Adan by Ichiko Aoba on Amazon Music". Amazon Music.
- Anon.[j] (n.d.). "Windswept Adan on Spotify". Spotify. Archived from the original on 22 May 2024.
- Anon.[k] (n.d.). "Windswept Adan on TIDAL". Tidal. Archived from the original on 15 June 2024.
- Anon.[l] (n.d.). "Windswept Adan Roots - Single on Apple Music". Apple Music. Archived from the original on 20 June 2024.
- Anon.[m] (n.d.). "Windswept Adan on Oricon's You Taiju Service". Oricon (in Japanese).
- Ba Da Bing Records (2021). Windswept Adan (Vinyl liner notes). Ichiko Aoba (artist). BING-169.
- Billboard Japan editors (3 June 2022). "Ichiko Aoba Announces 2022 World Tour: See the Dates". Billboard. ISSN 0006-2510. Archived from the original on 1 July 2022.
- Cinra writer (16 June 2021). "青葉市子の弾き語りシングル「Windswept Adan roots」配信リリース" [Ichiko Aoba's Acoustic Single "Windswept Adan Roots" Released for Streaming] (in Japanese). Cinra. Archived from the original on 6 October 2021.
- Cinra writer (19 August 2021). "青葉市子、「アダンの風」記念コンサートのライブ音源を配信リリース" [Ichiko Aoba Releases Live Recording of "Windswept Adan" Commemorative Concert for Streaming] (in Japanese). Cinra. Archived from the original on 17 October 2021.
- Cowan, Andy (January 2022). "Ichiko Aoba - Windswept Adan". Mojo. p. 91. ISSN 1351-0193 – via the Internet Archive.
- Dalton, Stephen (January 2022). "Windswept Adan: New Adventures in Dreamy Japanese Psych-folk". Uncut. p. 21. ISSN 1368-0722 – via the Internet Archive.
- Hakimian, Rob (3 November 2020). "Japanese Folk Star Ichiko Aoba Announces New Album with the Gorgeous "Porcelain"". Beats Per Minute. Archived from the original on 16 May 2024.
- Hakimian, Rob (9 December 2020). "BPM's Top 50 Albums of 2020". Beats Per Minute. p. 4. Archived from the original on 30 May 2023.
- Hakimian, Rob (18 June 2021). "Ichiko Aoba's Windswept Adan to be Released in USA and Europe on Vinyl Through Ba Da Bing". Beats Per Minute. Archived from the original on 16 May 2024.
- Honigmann, David (10 December 2021). "Ichiko Aoba Imagines a Musical Journey Between Islands on Windswept Adan". Financial Times. ISSN 0307-1766. Archived from the original on 24 December 2021.
- Japan Tourism Agency (n.d.). "Adan: Tree of Life". Ministry of Land, Infrastructure, Transport and Tourism. Archived from the original on 14 May 2024.
- Lewis, John (22 December 2021). "The 10 Best Contemporary Albums of 2021". The Guardian. ISSN 1756-3224. Archived from the original on 9 March 2024.
- Mackay, Emily (12 December 2021). "Ichiko Aoba: Windswept Adan Review – Hypnotic, Ghostly Psych-folk". The Observer. ISSN 0029-7712. Archived from the original on 27 September 2022.
- Marston, Charlotte (29 November 2021). "Be Transported to a Grand, Hyperreal Paradise by Ichiko Aoba". Loud and Quiet. Archived from the original on 12 October 2023.
- Mattox, Brendan (26 January 2021). "On Breakthrough "Windswept Adan" LP, Ichiko Aoba's Visionary Ambient Takes Flight". Bandcamp Daily. Archived from the original on 15 January 2024.
- McMullen, Chase (4 December 2020). "Album Review: Ichiko Aoba – Windswept Adan". Beats Per Minute. Archived from the original on 24 September 2023.
- Mikiki editors (17 June 2021). "青葉市子、ホール公演を前に弾き語り作「Windswept Adan roots」をサプライズ・リリース" [Ichiko Aoba Surprise Releases Acoustic Work "Windswept Adan Roots" Ahead of Hall Performance]. Mikiki (in Japanese). Tower Records Japan. Archived from the original on 14 May 2024.
- Natalie editors (10 January 2020). 青葉市子、作編曲に梅林太郎を迎えた新境地のニューシングル本日配信 [Ichiko Aoba Releases New Single Today, Marking a New Frontier with Composer Taro Umebayashi]. Natalie (in Japanese). Archived from the original on 29 May 2022.
- Natalie editors (30 October 2020). 青葉市子が12月にニューアルバムリリース、梅林太郎と再タッグの「Porcelain」を先行配信(動画あり) [Ichiko Aoba to Release New Album in December, Pre-releases "Porcelain" in Collaboration with Taro Umebayashi (Video Available)]. Natalie (in Japanese). Archived from the original on 18 January 2022.
- Natalie editors (27 November 2020). "青葉市子、新作「アダンの風」発売記念トークイベント開催(コメントあり)" [Ichiko Aoba to Hold Commemorative Talk Event for the Release of Her New Work "Windswept Adan" (With Commentary)]. Natalie (in Japanese). Archived from the original on 1 January 2021.
- Natalie editors (7 December 2020). "【ライブレポート】青葉市子が夜の原美術館で奏でた「アダンの風」、品川の海と鯨に思い馳せる即興曲も(写真12枚)" [Live Report: Ichiko Aoba Performs "Windswept Adan" at Night in the Hara Museum, Including an Improvised Piece Inspired by the Sea and Whales of Shinagawa (12 Photos)]. Natalie (in Japanese). Archived from the original on 25 September 2023.
- Natalie editors (18 January 2021). "青葉市子「アダンの風」発売記念展示のフィナーレを飾る配信コンサート開催" [Ichiko Aoba to Hold a Streaming Concert to Conclude the Commemorative Exhibition for the Release of "Windswept Adan"]. Natalie (in Japanese). Archived from the original on 14 May 2024.
- Natalie editors (25 June 2021). "【ライブレポート】青葉市子、オーチャードホールを海で満たした「アダンの風」コンサート(写真6枚)" [Live Report: Ichiko Aoba Fills Orchard Hall with the Sea in "Windswept Adan" Concert (6 Photos)]. Natalie (in Japanese). Archived from the original on 9 July 2021.
- Soo, J. X. (16 June 2022). "Listen to Ichiko Aoba's Gentle New Song, 'Hello'". NME. ISSN 0028-6362. Archived from the original on 20 May 2024.
- Thompson, Shy (22 November 2021). "Ichiko Aoba: Windswept Adan". Pitchfork. Archived from the original on 22 January 2024.
