= Croissant (magazine) =

Japanese women's magazine

- Inaugural issue, May 1977
- Native name: クロワッサン
- Categories: Women's lifestyle
- Frequency: Biweekly
- Publisher: Magazine House
- First issue: 1 May 1977
- Country: Japan
- Based in: Tokyo
- Language: Japanese
- Website: magazineworld.jp/croissant; croissant-online.jp

Croissant (クロワッサン, Kurowassan) is a biweekly Japanese women's magazine for middle-aged women.

== History and profile ==
The first issue of the magazine is dated 1 May 1977; the magazine is published twice a month, generally on the 10th and the 25th. Croissant is published by Magazine House (マガジンハウス, Magajin hausu), based in Tokyo. The company, which is also the founder of the magazine, was formerly named Heibun Shuppan. The target audience is middle-aged and married women. The frequent topics covered include home decoration, cooking, health, and beauty.

In 1980 the circulation of Croissant was 450,000 copies.

Croissant has sister publications, including an an, Brutus and Popeye.
