= Hanako (magazine) =

Japanese magazine

- Cover of Hanako No. 963, January 2010
- Categories: Women's magazine
- Frequency: Every second week
- First issue: 2 June 1988
- Company: Magazine House
- Country: Japan
- Based in: Tokyo
- Language: Japanese
- Website: hanako.tokyo; magazineworld.jp/hanako/

Hanako is a Japanese biweekly magazine for young women. Hanako was first published in 1988. The magazine was established by Magazine House which also publishes it. The headquarters is in Tokyo. It features shops, fashion, restaurants and theaters in Tokyo and abroad. The name of the magazine is from Hanako (花子, 華子), is a common Japanese female given name. The male equivalent from the same publisher is Popeye.

== Readership ==
The target audience is women in their 20s, who are often working as "office ladies" and are unmarried, living with their parents and with a large disposable income and savings. Its readers and their likes are referred to as Hanako-zoku (literally "Hanako tribe"), the original readership were called the Hanako generation and their perceived irresponsibility is called Hanako syndrome.

== Influence ==
Hanako has been very influential and is often referred to as a style bible. Businesses featured in the magazine has seen a wave of customers, in Japan and abroad.

== Editions ==
Hanako is published exclusively in the Tokyo metropolitan area. Hanako West covers the Kansai region with Osaka, Kobe and Kyoto.

== Cover design ==
The logo and cover between 1989 and 1999 were designed by Australian artist Ken Done.
