= Luminescent Creatures =

2025 studio album by Ichiko Aoba

Studio album by Ichiko Aoba
- Released: 28 February 2025
- Genres: Folk baroque; alternative music
- Length: 35:46
- Language: Japanese
- Label: Hermine
- Producers: Ichiko Aoba; Taro Umebayashi

Ichiko Aoba chronology
Amiko (Original Soundtrack) (2022)	Luminescent Creatures (2025)	15th Anniversary Concert (2026)

Singles from Luminescent Creatures
- 1. "Luciférine" Released: 13 November 2024; 2. "Flag" Released: 12 December 2024; 3. "Sonar" Released: 6 February 2025

Luminescent Creatures (Japanese: 発光する生き物, Hepburn: Hakkō Suru Ikimono) is the ninth studio album by Japanese singer-songwriter Ichiko Aoba, released on 28 February 2025 by her label, Hermine. The album's name is derived from the last track on Aoba's previous album, Windswept Adan, released in 2020. The album was preceded by three singles; "Luciférine," released on 13 November 2024; "Flag," released on 12 December 2024; and "Sonar," released on 6 February 2025.

Luminescent Creatures is a folk baroque and alternative music album with elements of psychedelic folk, classical, and ambient music. It is intended as an extension of her previous album and a continuation both rich instrumentation and of Aoba's interest in the natural world, as Luminescent Creatures features key members of Windswept Adan, namely composer Taro Umebayashi, sound engineer Toshihiko Kasai, and photographer Kodai Kobayashi.

Like its predecessor, Windswept Adan, the album received widespread critical acclaim.

== Background ==
On 19 and 26 October 2024, Aoba performed the "Luminescent Creatures World Premiere," a live performance of Luminescent Creatures, in Sankei Hall Breeze in Osaka and Showa Women's University in Tokyo, respectively. One month later, on 13 November, Aoba announced that Luminescent Creatures was due for release on 28 February 2025. She also released "Luciférine" as a lead single and announced a world tour taking place from February to May 2025, specifically spanning countries in Asia, Europe, and North America.

On 12 December 2024, Aoba released the song "Flag" as well as a live performance video which had been recorded at the Into the Great Wide Open festival in The Netherlands. The latter includes renditions of songs from her previous albums, Mahoroboshiya and q p. On 6 February 2025, Aoba released the song "Sonar," alongside a music video, in anticipation of the album's release at the end of the month.

== Development ==
=== Writing ===
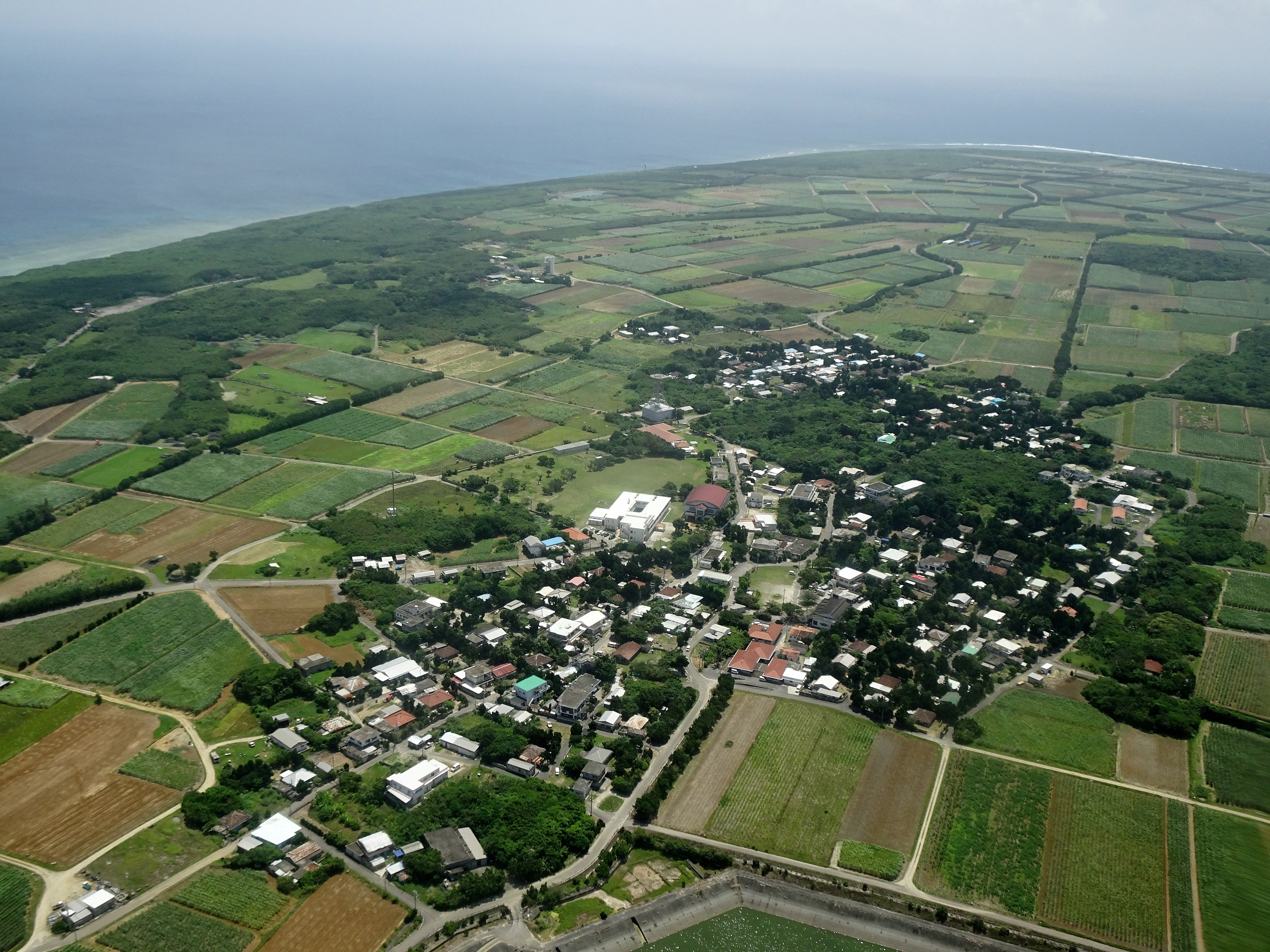
An aerial view of Hateruma's one and only village, located in the center of the island and flanked by farmland.

Aoba first encountered the study of whales while playing a festival in the Tōhoku region in 2019. This interest drew her to become a regular visitor of Okinawa and the Yaeyama islands of the Ryukyu island chain—visits which inspired the initial development of Windswept Adan. She would often dive without gear into the islands' surrounding seawater, which Aoba said made death "right around the corner," facilitating a "fearful" yet "beautiful" experience, like seeing a "beautiful vision right before I [Aoba] die." She became particularly fascinated with Hateruma, the southernmost and smallest inhabited coral island of the Ryukyu chain, which Aoba and the team that worked on the album spent the majority of their time on, understandings its tradition and ecosystem.

As a successor to the concept album, Windswept Adan, which scored a fictional film following a young girl, Luminescent Creatures describes what follows her death and subsequent reincarnation. Thus, the album's subject matter concerns earth's formation and "the first creatures born in the sea," which Aoba said were "lonely," but which—in reference to her sampling of whales communicating on the album—illustrated a "[want] to share their existence." The album furthermore contemplates on these organisms' interconnectedness.

== Composition ==
=== Songs ===
The opening track "COLORATURA" features flute, strings, piano, and vocals, including humming. Lewis likened its flutes and strings to birds "soar[ing] overhead."

The album's second track, "24° 3′ 27.0″ N, 123° 47′ 7.5″ E"—whose title are coordinates of the island's lighthouse—is a traditional folk song of Hateruma performed in a local, spiritual festival; having participated in the festival three times and learning its songs, Aoba—as suggested by Umebayashi—chose to include it in a kind of "collaboration" with the island. Furthermore, Aoba added that the album was, altogether, serving as its own "lighthouse of sorts."

"Luciférine," named after the french word for the bioluminescent luciferin chemical compound, features strings, flute, and piano. Aoba's fascination with the bioluminescence dates back to research she undertook when developing Windswept Adan, during which she discovered the use of single-cell organisms' bioluminescence for communication, such as attraction behaviors, between some of earth's earliest forms of life. Aoba interpreted the behavior as being the organisms' ways of saying "'I'm here,' 'I love you,' or 'I want to be loved by you.'" Unlike the more bare preceding tracks, "Luciférine" is more densely instrumented—featuring layers of harp, violin, violin, and piano—and featuring lyrics making reference to the creatures of Aoba's research: "Here, life can be found from long before words were ever born." The track is ultimately closed by a violin melody which has been likened to those of Radiohead's "Pyramid Song".

== Critical reception ==
Professional ratings
Aggregate scores
Source	Rating
AnyDecentMusic?	8.0/10
Metacritic	86/100
Review scores
Source	Rating
AllMusic	4/5 stars
Beats Per Minute	89%
Clash	9/10
Financial Times	4/5 stars
The Observer	4/5 stars
Paste	8.5/10
Pitchfork	8.4/10
Record Collector	4/5 stars
The Skinny	4/5 stars
Uncut	8/10

Luminescent Creatures was met with widespread critical acclaim. At Metacritic, which assigns a normalized rating out of 100 to reviews from professional publications, the album received an average score of 86, based on 10 reviews.

Critics found that Aoba's production in Luminescent Creatures encapsulated the entire thrust of her discography, namely the more minimalist, acoustic sounds of her earlier albums juxtaposed against the grander, more orchestral soundscapes of her later ones.

Comparing the album's sonic experience to Wim Wenders' Perfect Days, Everything is Noise stated: "Indeed, it's the overall feel of this record that makes it so wholly engrossing in my eyes. At its heart sits Aoba herself, an acoustic guitar in her hands, softly playing the songs she dreamed up; around her, further sounds materialize—lush strings, keyboard instruments, the occasional flute or auxiliary woodwind."

Seeing a through line from Windswept Adan to this album, Flaunt noted: "Luminescent Creatures delves into minutiae of her densely lush meanderings, where the littlest of hum can carry the heaviest of weight. We hear gentle flutes and fluttering keys traverse in and through as if they’ve traveled far to whisper in your ear."

Narc Magazine rated the album four and a half out of five, calling it "akin to a painting" with "haunting melodies" and "delicate instrumentation." The Skinny rated the album four out of five, lauding the songs' minimalistic yet still detailed and meaningful nature as a contrast to her more "cinematic" and "grandiose" efforts on Windswept Adan. Financial Times gave the album four out of five stars, writing: "The music drifts and sways. Taro Umebayashi's piano rises like a pearl diver heading for the surface, then darts away like a shoal of tiny fish."

Cult Following lauded the album's "lush tone" and its realization of beauty within the natural world: "Expect the warm tones, the natural charms of an album connected with nature and all its wisdom. Prepare for more than that. Aoba discovers the joy of being present and evolves the listening experience Luminescent Creatures offers so wonderfully."

== Track listing ==
All lyrics by Aoba except "24° 3' 27.0" N 123° 47' 07.5" E" (traditional). All songs produced by Aoba and Taro Umebayashi.

Luminescent Creatures track listing
No.	Title	Music	Length
1.	"Coloratura"	Umebayashi	4:07
2.	"24° 3' 27.0" N 123° 47' 07.5" E"	Traditional	1:07
3.	"Mazamun"	Aoba	3:27
4.	"Tower"	Aoba, Umebayashi	4:03
5.	"Aurora"	Aoba	2:03
6.	"Flag"	Aoba	4:36
7.	"Cochlea"	Aoba, Umebayashi	0:54
8.	"Luciférine"	Umebayashi	5:01
9.	"Pirsomnia"	Umebayashi	3:39
10.	"Sonar"	Aoba	3:17
11.	"Wakusei no Namida" (惑星の泪)	Umebayashi	3:25
Total length:			35:46

== Personnel ==
Credits adapted from the Bandcamp release of Luminescent Creatures.

=== Musicians ===
- Ichiko Aoba: all vocals, classical guitar, Steiner chime, shell, field recordings, electric piano, additional vocal arrangements (tracks 1 & 9)
- Taro Umebayashi: acoustic piano, celesta, synthesizer, electric guitar, orchestration
- Junichiro Taku: flute (tracks 1 & 8)
- Tomoyuki Asakawa: harp (tracks 1, 2, & 8)
- Manami Kakudo: percussion (tracks 1, 7, & 8)
- Phonolite Strings (tracks 1, 2, 4, & 8)
  - Yuko Kajitani: first violin
  - Asano Mekaru: second violin
  - Anzu Suhara: viola
  - Orie Hirayama: cello
  - Hiroaki Mizutani: contrabass

=== Production ===
- Ichiko Aoba & Taro Umebayashi: production
- Toshihiko Kasai: recording and mixing
- Takuma Kase: additional editing
- Arou Yamauchi, Ryota Koshimitsu, & Minori Ishikawa: assistant engineers
- Seigen Ono: mastering

=== Creative direction ===
- Kodai Kobayashi: art direction, photography
- Hikari Machiguchi: design

== Charts ==
Chart performance for Luminescent Creatures
Chart (2025)	Peak position
Japanese Albums (Oricon)	30
Scottish Albums (Official Charts)	41
UK Album Downloads (Official Charts)	91
UK Independent Albums (Official Charts)	17
US World Albums (Billboard)	17
