= Ken Done =

Australian artist

Ken Done AM
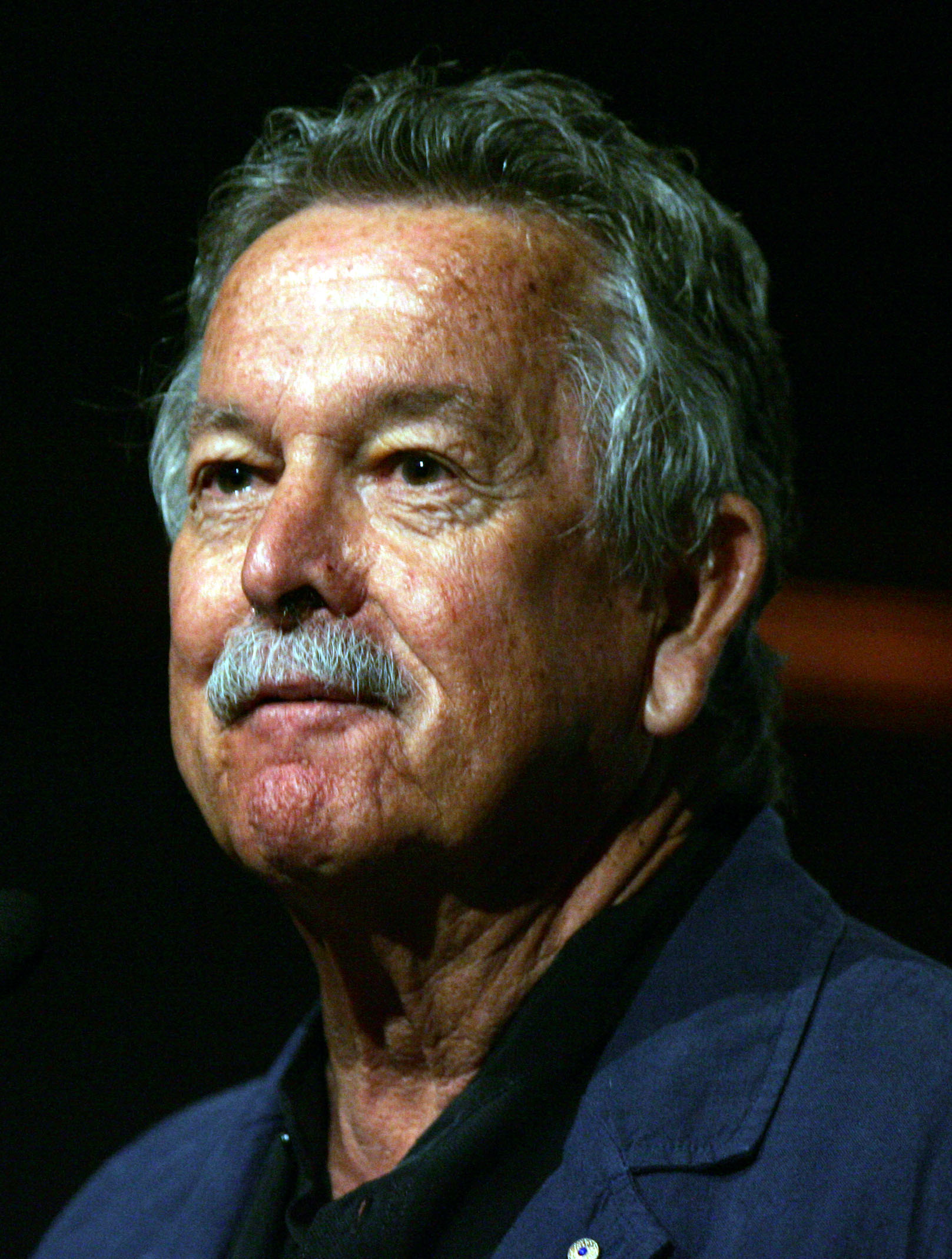
- Done in 2014
- Born: Kenneth Stephen Done; 29 June 1940 (age 86); Sydney, New South Wales, Australia
- Education: National Art School
- Website: kendone.com.au

Kenneth Stephen Done AM (born 29 June 1940) is an Australian artist best known for his design work. Although his simple, brightly coloured images of Australian landmarks have adorned a very popular range of clothing and homewares sold under the "Done Design" brand, Done's primary interest is in being a painter. Art critic John McDonald said: "Anybody who has anything to do with him realises he is a very serious artist."

== Early life ==
Ken Done, an only child, grew up in the northern suburbs of Sydney, New South Wales, and left high school at age 14 to study at the National Art School in East Sydney between 1954 and 1959. At the end of this decade he travelled abroad and began working with the New York and London based advertising agency J. Walter Thompson. He returned to Sydney in 1969 and became a full-time painter in 1975.

== Exhibitions and works ==
Done's first solo exhibition was in Sydney in 1980. To date, he has staged over 100 exhibitions dedicated solely to his work. Done's work has been exhibited in Australia, Japan, France and other countries. His first European exhibition was held in Paris in 1996. In the year 2000, his works were exhibited in Los Angeles and in London.

His work for the 1988 World Exposition held in Brisbane Australia — the Children of the World facade for the United Nations Pavilion, and the alphabet letter blocks that adorned the entrance and exit of the Australia Pavilion — is regarded as having played a central role in the celebration and popular culture of Bicentennial Australia and were among most photographed works of art at the Expo. In 2018, as part of the 30th Anniversary celebration of Expo 88, they were fully restored.

In 1994, the Powerhouse Museum staged a major retrospective of Done's work.

From Dec 11–20, 2015, Done exhibited a solo show of selected works produced throughout his career titled 'The Joy of Colour' at Trevor Victor Harvey Gallery in Seaforth, the first solo show in a commercial gallery that Ken Done has exhibited in, outside his personally owned gallery located in The Rocks, Sydney.

His touring exhibition Paintings you probably haven't seen, travelled for almost three years, touring regional galleries around Australia from 2019. The 35 artworks were hung in 11 galleries, from Far North Queensland to Victoria. They travelled over 10,000 km, and were hung for 809 days.

== Design company ==
Ken Done created a design company called "Done Art and Design" with his wife Judy Done. The company started out by producing small runs of T-shirts featuring Done's art and the garment design of his wife, Judy. In 1993 the company won the Fashion Industries of Australia's Grand Award.

An original Ken Done work featured on the cover of the Japanese women's magazine Hanako every week between 1989 and 1999.

== Advocacy ==
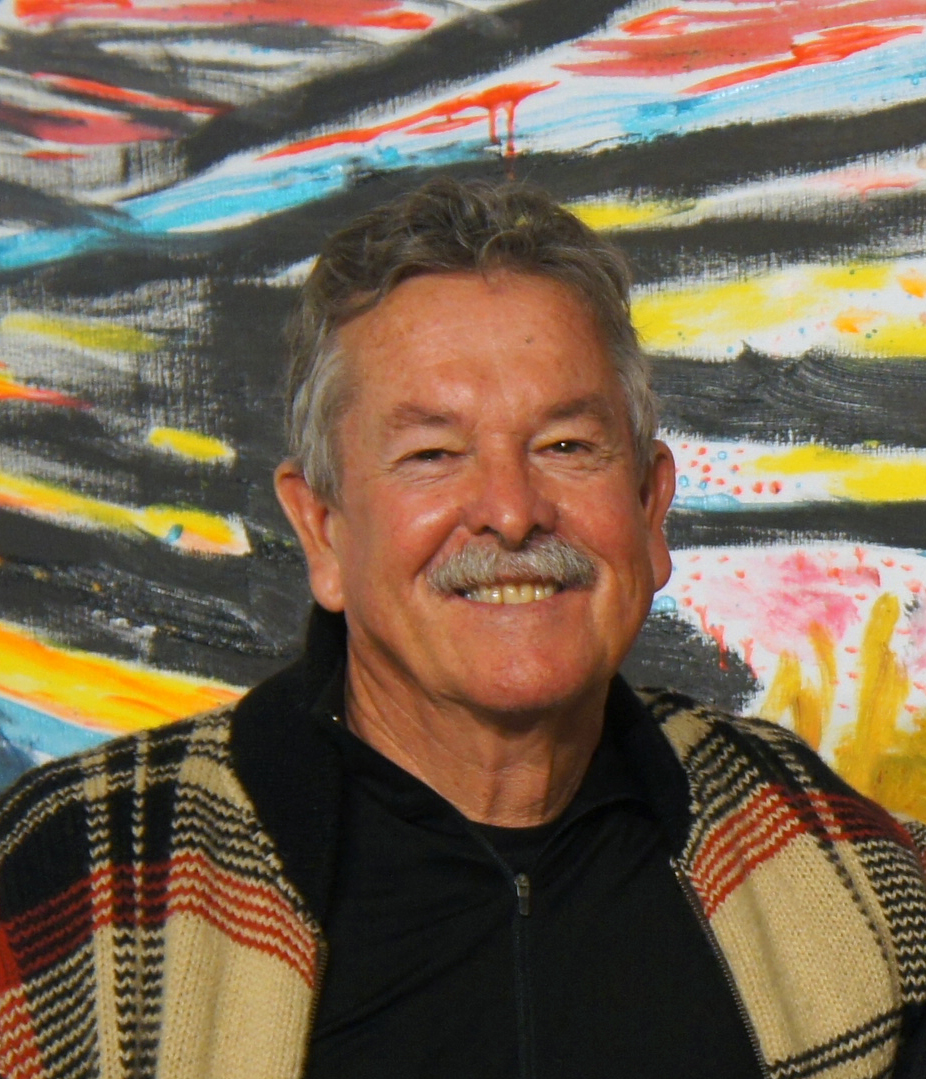
Done at Mosman Art Gallery in 2010

Done was a UNICEF Australia Goodwill Ambassador from 1988 to 2024 and won the Australian father of the year award in 1989.

In 1995, Done was asked to create a series of flag designs by Australian Prime Minister Paul Keating. Done submitted sixteen designs to Ausflag, some of which he had created as early as 1981.

Done was commissioned to produce a series of works for both the opening and closing ceremonies of the 2000 Summer Olympics.

Ken Done has long been a supporter of art in Australia, especially encouraging school students through awards and sponsorships.

Done sued the Australian band TISM for appropriating his work on an album cover. The album formerly named Australia the Lucky Cunt was released in September 1993 and depicted a Done-style koala with a syringe in its mouth. Done was angered by this use and obtained an injunction order to ban the sale of the album.

In 2006, he designed and created the United Buddy Bear for Australia.

The Ken Done Gallery is located in The Rocks, Sydney.

== Distinctions ==
- Australia: Order of Australia (AM) for services to Art, Design, and Tourism (1992)

== Awards ==
- 1967 Cannes Gold Lion Award
- 1973 Gold and Silver A.W.A.R.D.S.
- 1974 D. & A.D. Awards O.A.A.A. Award
- 1975 Melbourne A.D.C. Awards
- 1976 Caxton Award
- 1977 F.A.C.T.S. Award
- 1986 New South Wales Tourism Award
- 1989 Father of the Year
- 1992 Order of Australia (AM) for services to Art, Design and Tourism
- 1993 Fashion Industries of Australia Grand Award
- 1993 Mosman Citizen of the Year
- 1993 Rotary International Award for Excellence
- 1993 Spirit of Australia Award for excellence in the Australian Arts
- 1994 Paul Harris Fellow, Rotary International
- 1999 Westpac Export Heroes Award, Australian Institute of Export
- 1999 Fellow of Design Institute of Australia (Hon)
- 2002 Powerhouse Museum Life Fellow
- 2002 Bachelor of Design (Hon), Sydney Graphics College
- 2007 The Japanese Foreign Minister's Award
- 2013 Design Institute of Australia Hall of Fame
- 2016 GQ Iconic Artist
- 2022 Australian Fashion Laureate Lifetime Achievement Award

== Quotes ==
- If I make a painting, it should be seen for what it's set out to do too. A lot of the things that I do, it's not all art. Some of it's design, some of it's illustration, some of it's graphics, some of it's concept, some of it's business and some of it, hopefully, is art.
- Art shouldn't be something that you go quietly into an art gallery and dip your forelock and say 'I have to be very quiet, I'm in here amongst the art.' It's here, art's everywhere. It's how you use your eyes. It's about the enjoyment of visual things. And it's certainly not for any one group of people.
- I've always thought that there shouldn't be any limit to the things that are well designed. And I think that people who consider that art should only be kept for art galleries and doesn't have a role in public life, I think that's too narrow.
- In the times in which we live it is far too restricting to say that art can only be found in art galleries and not touch people's everyday lives.. I want to use any means that are necessary to communicate to people what I feel about things. There are no rules. And if there are rules, then you may as well break them.
- Wherever you are in the world, there's always something about the Australian light. There's something about the sharpness of it, something about the clarity of it, something about the colours of Australia. And, hopefully, something optimistic about Australian painting too.
