= Ichiko Aoba =

Japanese singer and songwriter (born 1990)

Ichiko Aoba 青葉市子
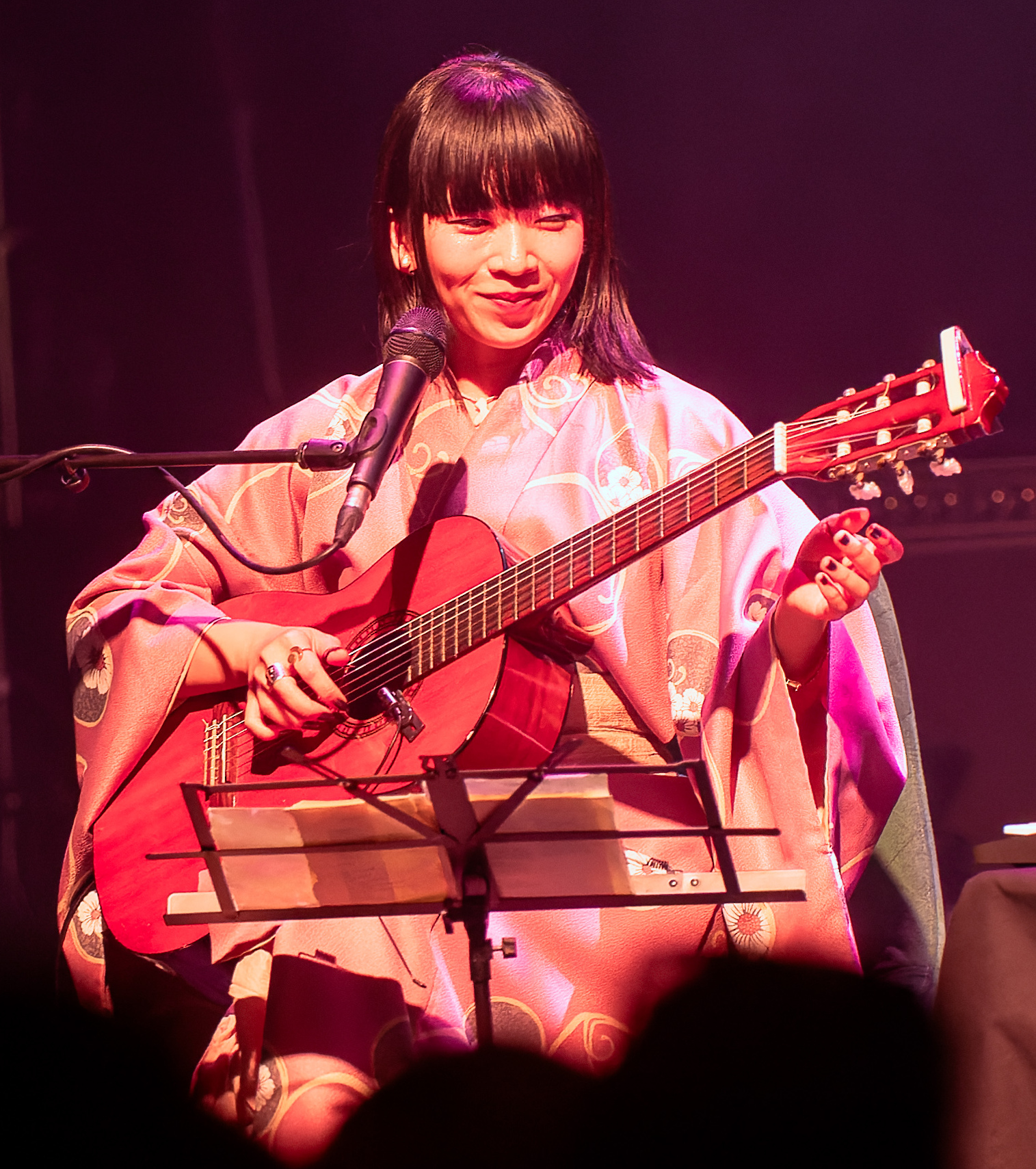
- Aoba in 2023

Background information
- Born: 28 January 1990 (age 36); Urayasu, Chiba, Japan
- Origin: Kyoto Prefecture, Japan
- Genre: Folk
- Occupations: Singer; songwriter
- Instruments: Vocals; guitar; piano; accordion; clarinet; flute
- Years active: 2010–present
- Labels: Sinonome; Speedstar Records; commmons; hermine
- Member of: NUUAMM
- Website: www.ichikoaoba.com

Ichiko Aoba (Japanese: 青葉市子, Hepburn: Aoba Ichiko; born 28 January 1990) is a Japanese folk singer-songwriter and guitarist. She plays multiple instruments, including guitar, piano, clarinet, accordion, and flute.

Aoba is known for her dream-inspired acoustic sound and songwriting, as well as her use of field recordings, largely owed to frequent collaborator ZAK of Fishmans fame.

== Early life ==
Aoba was born in Urayasu, Chiba on 28 January 1990. She was raised in Japan's Kyoto Prefecture, at the foot of a mountain, whose nature—and particularly its mudslides—"instilled" both an "awe" and "fear" of nature. This was inspired by her father, who was a craftsman and involved himself in environmental communities in Kyoto. Her mother worked for Disney and sang everything from traditional Japanese folk music to modern pop songs, which introduced Aoba to Disney films from a young age. Aoba also watched Studio Ghibli films, particularly Nausicaä of the Valley of the Wind and Princess Mononoke, which would later inspire much of her sound. Beyond these formal mediums of inspiration, Aoba was also drawn to noticing the sounds of household appliances and items, including those of her red toy piano; on it, she would learn her first song, the opening theme of the Sailor Moon anime series, "Moonlight Densetsu," by ear from the episodes airing on television.

Aoba attended a number of Catholic high schools in Kyoto where she sang in a choir. However, Aoba said she has always "[felt] a sense of inferiority that I [she] cannot sing loud," leading her to drop out of her choir in junior year and join the brass band as a clarinetist, choosing not to practice singing further. Her time outside the home in these schools left her with both painful and positive memories that were "[sometimes so] hard I [she] felt like I [she] was going to die." However, she feels reliving those memories gives her "a toolbox with which to weave a tapestry of music and art."

Aoba would start playing electric guitar at age 15 but quickly switched over to classical guitar by picking up the budget short-scale classical guitar Yamaha CS40J which she still uses for live performances today. At age seventeen, Aoba attended a concert of Japanese singer-songwriter and eight-string classical guitarist Anmi Yamada, which moved her so much so that she sought his mentorship. During her initial learning, she loved covering the songs of Yamada, whom she would later begin to call over the phone for lessons. Under his mentorship, Aoba learned to play a range of composed pieces, including those of Django Reinhardt and Taeko Onuki—the latter of whom continued to inspire Aoba longer after first learning the pieces. A year later, she moved from Kyoto to Tokyo, partly to continue learning from her first and only mentor, Yamada. Here, she would perform her first live shows in Tokyo's Ginza District, playing songs from Yamada's repertoire. In time, Yamada both encouraged Aoba to sing and pursue her own songwriting.

== Musical career ==
=== 2008–2013: Kamisori Otome, Origami, Utabiko, and 0 ===
Between moving to Tokyo and the eventual release of Razorblade Girl (Japanese: 剃刀乙女, romanized: Kamisori Otome), Aoba wrote her first song, "Kokoro no Sekai," (Japanese: こころ の せかい, lit. '"The World of the Heart"') largely in dedication to Yamada. In 2010, Aoba, aged 19, released her first album, Kamisore Otome.

Around 2012, Aoba was introduced to GEZAN frontman Mahito the People by their mutual friend Koji Shimotsu (frontman of Odotte Bakari no Kuni). Aoba and Mahito formed the collaborative duo NUUAMM, which has since released two studio albums: NUUAMM (2014) and w / ave (2017).

0 features two covers of her mentor Yamada's songs, "Clockwork Universe" (Japanese: 機械仕掛乃宇宙, romanized: Kikai Jikake no Uchuu) and "Spring Summer Fall Winter" (Japanese: はるなつあきふゆ, romanized: Haru Natsu Aki Fuyu).

=== 2012–2014: Mahoroboshiya and qp ===
In 2013, Aoba was asked to work for a theatre production of 9 Days Queen, a stage play by playwright Go Aoki. She has also worked with Takahiro Fujita's Mum & Gypsy company in a production of Cocoon, as well as a revival of Lemmings by Shūji Terayama, the latter in which Aoba played the role of "The Girl" and performed alongside the late Tengai Amano and Yukichi Matsumoto.

Aoba features on the soundtrack of the 2019 Nintendo Switch remake of The Legend of Zelda: Link's Awakening. Her arrangement was used to promote the game in Japan.

Aoba has collaborated with Ryuichi Sakamoto, Taylor Deupree, Cornelius, Haruomi Hosono, Mac DeMarco, Sweet William, and Mahito the People.

qp features a cover of one of her mentor Yamada's songs.

=== 2019–2020: Ayukawa no shizuku and Windswept Adan ===
Windswept Adan was released in 2020 under her newly created Hermine label. Windswept Adan was inspired by the Ryukyu island chain and, according to Aoba, the album intended to "[get] an impression of the islands."

=== 2021–2023: Amiko and live albums ===
Aoba composed the soundtrack of the 2022 film Amiko, an adaptation of the novel by Natsuko Imamura. The film received the 2023 Mainichi Film Award for Best Soundtrack.

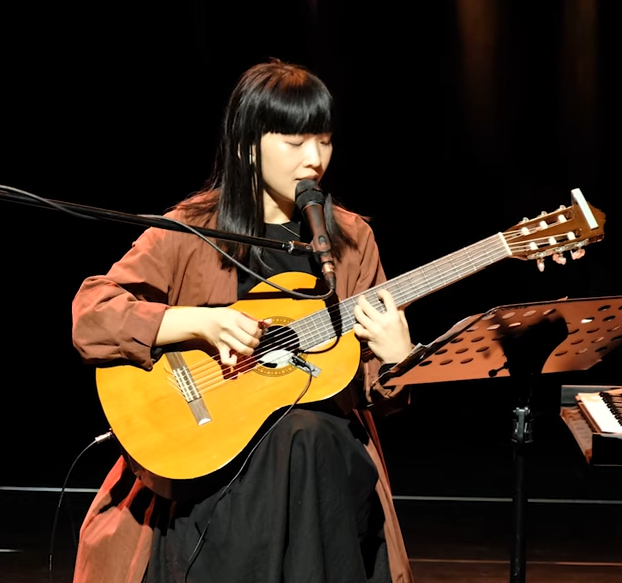
Aoba performing live at Seogyo Square in Seoul, South Korea on 10 December 2022

=== 2024–present: Luminescent Creatures ===
In preparation for the release of Luminescent Creatures, Aoba and the team that worked on the album spent most of their time on Hateruma, the southernmost and smallest island of the Ryukyu chain, understandings its tradition and ecosystem.

Luminescent Creatures, which Aoba has described as "closely related" to and "born from" Windswept Adan, is an ode to Hateruma.

Following the release of Luminescent Creatures, Aoba embarked on the Luminescent Creatures Tour and Across the Oceans Tour promoting the album. In 2026, Aoba released "Sayonara Penguin," a studio version of a song often played during her live concerts.

== Artistry ==
=== Influences ===
In 2014, Aoba cited Björk's Debut and albums by Tavito Nanao, Mahito the People, and Django Reinhardt, among others, as albums that have "changed her life."

Aoba also cites Ryuichi Sakamoto as an influence, having collaborated with him on Radio.

=== Musical inspiration and process ===
Dreams are "the most important thing" to Aoba's artistic inspiration; she says she "dream[s] a lot," which she writes down and draws to remember them. Furthermore, she is in a better state of mind to make music when she is sleepy because being awake makes things seem "real." To help her "[need]" to digest "everything that happens to [her]," Aoba always carries around a notebook and pen.

Aoba creates the "story" of her works before the music itself. She uses doodles as a means of creating imagery for the story, which upon completing mentally, she will "express" through music. Aoba believes that "being stuck is [a very important] part of the process"—a struggle which "is part of the joy of making [music]," despite "not always [being] fun." When facing difficulty during this process, Aoba says she finds "the spring of inspiration" at the middle of the chaos, which she has described as "an adventure." She believe much of this process is "a very mono action," adding that it reminds her of the "aloneness that we all have."

=== Musical style ===
Aoba's primary instruments are the guitar and voice, but later expanded to include more orchestral instrumentation. She describes her instruments as her "best friends," preferring "singing to talking." Despite feelings of inferiority, Aoba says that "for as long as I can use my voice, I want to make music."

== Other ventures ==
Aoba founded her own independent record label, Hermine, in 2020. She chose to found it due to "a gap between the music industry and what I [Aoba] want to do."

== Personal life ==
Despite Aoba attending a Catholic school and her father being involved with Buddhism, Aoba has described herself as "not subscrib[ing] to a certain religion."

Aoba supports her music being used on and shared across social media platforms, but reserves that its use in advertising "needs more moderating."

== Discography ==
=== Studio albums ===
- 2010: Kamisori Otome (剃刀乙女)
- 2011: Origami (檻髪)
- 2012: Utabiko (うたびこ)
- 2013: 0
- 2016: Mahoroboshiya (マホロボシヤ)
- 2018: qp
- 2019: Ayukawa no shizuku (鮎川のしづく)
- 2020: Windswept Adan (アダンの風)
- 2022: Amiko (Original Soundtrack)
- 2025: Luminescent Creatures

=== Live albums ===
- 2011: Kaizokuban (かいぞくばん)
- 2014: 0%
- 2017: Pneuma
- 2020: "gift" at Sogetsu Hall
- 2021: Live at Ginza Sony Park
- 2021: "Windswept Adan" Concert At Bunkamura Orchard Hall
- 2021: Live at Jazzstate, 4 December 2019 (with Albert Karch)
- 2023: Live at Milton Court (with 12 Ensemble)
- 2025: Live at Tokyo Opera City Concert Hall (15th Anniversary Concert)

=== Other releases ===
- 2011: Hinoko (火のこ) – Ichiko Aoba & Kazuhisa Uchihashi
- 2012: Meteor (流星) – Haruka Nakamura & Ichiko Aoba
- 2013: Radio (ラヂヲ) – Ichiko Aoba and the Fairies (青葉市子と妖精たち)
- 2013: Yura Yura feat. Ichiko Aoba – Ovall (Dawn)
- 2013: Soto wa Senjou da yo (外は戦場だよ) feat. Ichiko Aoba – Cornelius (Ghost in the Shell: Arise OST)
- 2019: Amaneki (あまねき) – Sweet William & Ichiko Aoba
- 2020: amuletum bouquet – Ichiko Aoba
- 2020: "gift" BGM – Ichiko Aoba
- 2020: Seabed Eden (海底のエデン) – Ichiko Aoba
- 2021: Asleep Among Endives (アンディーヴと眠って) – Ichiko Aoba
- 2021: Windswept Adan Roots – Ichiko Aoba
- 2022: hello – Ichiko Aoba
- 2023: Space Orphans – Ichiko Aoba
- 2023: meringue doll – Ichiko Aoba
- 2023: Sketch – Ichiko Aoba
- 2024: Seabed Eden - French version – Ichiko Aoba & Pomme
- 2024: Grandiose - Japanese version – Pomme & Ichiko Aoba
- 2024: Lullaby – Ichiko Aoba
- 2024: FLAG – Ichiko Aoba
- 2025: SONAR – Ichiko Aoba
- 2026: Sayonara Penguin (さよならペンギン) – Ichiko Aoba

== Awards ==
Year	Awards	Category	Work	Result
2023	Mainichi Film Awards	Best Soundtrack	Amiko	Won
2023	Reeperbahn Festival	ANCHOR	Herself	Won
