= Brutus (magazine) =

Japanese men's magazine

- Cover of the 1 May 1984 issue, illustrated by Kazuhisa Ashibe
- Editor: Ro Tajima
- Categories: Men's magazine
- Frequency: Semimonthly
- Founded: 1980
- First issue: May 1980
- Company: Magazine House
- Country: Japan
- Based in: Tokyo
- Language: Japanese
- Website: magazineworld.jp/brutus; brutus.jp

Brutus is a Japanese men's magazine published by Magazine House, focusing on pop culture and lifestyle. The name is licensed from King Features Syndicate.

== History ==
Brutus launched in May 1980, conceived by Magazine House as a companion to its existing men's title Popeye. Where Popeye had been founded four years earlier around admiration for West Coast American culture, Brutus was conceived as its older brother, oriented toward a longing for life in New York. The magazine's logo was designed by art director Seiichi Horiuchi, who also designed the logos for sister publications Popeye, an an, and Olive. The logo directly references Brutus, the antagonist in E. C. Segar's Popeye comic strip; each letterform ends in jagged strokes that resemble the character's beard.

In 1998, a design- and architecture-focused special edition called Casa Brutus was launched and became a standalone monthly publication in 2000.

== Publication ==
Brutus is published by Tokyo-based Magazine House. The magazine was initially published monthly, then biweekly, and is now semimonthly. Sister publications include an an, Popeye, Casa Brutus, and Olive.

Because themes vary issue to issue, most Japanese readers buy individual copies rather than subscribing, with each edition drawing a different audience. In November and December 2025, the magazine published its first English-language editions.

=== Editors-in-chief ===
Name	Tenure
Yoshihisa Kinameri	1980
Jirō Ishikawa	1981–1985
Mitsunori Iwase	1985–1988
Yutaka Hirasawa	1988–1989
Giichiro Hata	1989–1992
Mitsunori Iwase	1992–1994
Koichi Tezuka	1994–1996
Kazuhiro Saito	1996–2001
Takefumi Ishiwatari	2001–2007
Zenta Nishida	2007–2021
Ro Tajima	2022–present

== Reception ==
A 1991 Associated Press article described the magazine as popular. In 2013, the magazine and Popeye received the Best Magazine Award.

As of the fourth quarter of 2025, Brutus had a circulation of 60,667. The magazine targets trend-conscious males aged 20 to 50.
