= Hot-Dog Press =

Japanese men's magazine

- Cover of issue 28, 25 July 1981, designed by Hiroshi Nagai
- Native name: ホットドッグ・プレス
- Categories: Men's magazine
- Frequency: Semimonthly/biweekly (1979–2002); Monthly (2002–2004)
- Circulation: 210,000 (2003–2004)
- Founded: July 1979
- Final issue Number: December 2004; 558
- Company: Kodansha
- Country: Japan
- Language: Japanese
- OCLC: 49778640

Hot-Dog Press (ホットドッグ・プレス, styled as Hot•Dog PRESS) was a Japanese men's magazine published by Kodansha, launched in 1979 as a rival to Magazine House's Popeye and characterized as "a nearly identical rip-off" of it. During the 1980s, it was among the most popular magazines read by Japanese youth.

It began publication in July 1979. At launch, it published semimonthly; under editor Yamada Gorō, it published biweekly; and switched to monthly when it was renamed HDP in 2002. Its print run ended with the December 2004 issue. It briefly returned in 2010 as a limited-run web magazine, OYAJI Hot-Dog Press, and was rebooted in 2014 as a digital magazine.

== Description ==
It was in the johoshi genre of Japanese trend-information magazines that advised readers on food, fashion, and lifestyle, and that covered lifestyle trends in Los Angeles and New York. Contributors included Seikō Itō, Kenzo Kitakata, Ryū Murakami, and Nancy Seki. The magazine had two distinct parts: a "manual" of how-to articles, often about women and sex, and a "catalog" focused on fashion.

== History ==
In 1982, the magazine devoted an issue to Kensuke Ishizu, who was credited with bringing Ivy League style to Japan, and the issue became the first to outsell Popeye. According to a Japanese publishing trade annual, the following year was "the year of men's magazines". By 1991, Hot-Dog Press claimed higher sales than Popeye, which had a circulation of 700,000 copies per issue.

By the mid-1990s, both Hot-Dog Press and Popeye struggled as the current generation of Japanese youth rejected being told what to buy. By 1997, the Kodansha website contained the full text of issues. Its circulation was 360,000 c. 1998.

In November 2002, the magazine was renamed HDP, with a target audience aged 19–24. Its circulation was 210,000 c. 2003. The print edition's final issue was December 2004.

In 2010, it launched as a website on the Infoseek platform under the name OYAJI Hot-Dog Press. In June 2014, Kodansha relaunched the magazine as a digital magazine, aimed at middle-aged men.

In April 2015, BS NTV launched 月刊ホットドッグプレスTV (transl. Monthly Hot-Dog Press TV), a variety program produced in collaboration with Kodansha's digital magazine. The show aired monthly on Tuesday nights and was hosted by comedian Hiroya Yamazaki of the duo Untouchable. It targeted the same audience and covered the same content as the digital magazine.
