= Take Ivy =

1965 fashion photography book

- Authors: Teruyoshi Hayashida; Shosuke Ishizu; Kurosu Toshiyuki; Hajime Hasegawa
- Language: English
- Genre: Fashion photography
- Publication date: 1965

Take Ivy is a 1965 fashion photography book that documents the attire of Ivy League students from the 1960s.

The New York Times described it as "a treasure of fashion insiders". Take Ivy has been the Ivy League bible for Japanese baby boomers; it influenced a broader "neo-Ivy" style in the mid-2010s. The book has sold more than 50,000 copies worldwide. Original copies are rare in the West, garnering auction prices as high as $2,000.

Magazine editors and retailers display looks taken straight from the photos from the book. American designers such as Ralph Lauren and J. Crew display copies of Take Ivy in their store shelves.

Take Ivy was originally published in 1965 in Japan by Fujingahosha magazine publishers, known today as Hachette Fujuingaho, Co., Ltd. The latest edition was published by powerHouse Books in Brooklyn, New York, on August 31, 2010, and retailed for US$24.95 and CA$28.95. In 2011, a Dutch translation was written by Michael Hendriks and published by Parvenu Publishers, retailing for €19,95.

== Background ==
Take Ivy, written by four Japanese sartorial-style enthusiasts, is a collection of candid photographs shot on the campuses of America's elite Ivy League universities between 1959 and 1965. Most are of college-aged men distinctively dressed in fine American-made garments and engaging in college activities such as eating; lounging in the quad; riding bikes; or studying in the library, in class, or at the boathouse. The title was inspired by "Take Five", the 1959 jazz song by Dave Brubeck.

== Authors ==
Teruyoshi Hayashida was born and raised in the fashionable Aoyama District of Tokyo. He began shooting cover images for Men's Club magazine right after the title's launch. His style is considered to be highly sophisticated and he is a connoisseur of gourmet food.

Shosuke Ishizu, the director of Ishizu Office, was born in Okayama Prefecture. He started working in the editorial division at Men's Club after graduating from Kuwasawa Design School. He established Ishizu Office in 1983, and continues to produce several clothing brands including Niblick.

Kurosu Toshiyuki joined VAN Jacket Inc. in 1961, where he developed merchandise and promoted sales. He left the company in 1970 and started his own business called Cross and Simon. After the brand stopped doing business, Toshiyuki began appearing as a regular guest on the hit variety show called Asayan. Toshiyuki is also an active writer and intellectual.

Hajime (Paul) Hasegawa is from Hyogo Prefecture. After finishing his studies in the U.S. in 1963, Hasegawa returned to Japan to join VAN Jacket Inc., where he handled advertising and public relations. Hasegawa was the main coordinator and interpreter for the production of Take Ivy. Since then he has held various managerial positions in Japan and abroad, including as the executive director for Cosmo Public Relations Corporation.
