= Ivy League (clothes) =

Style of 1950s northeastern USA fashion

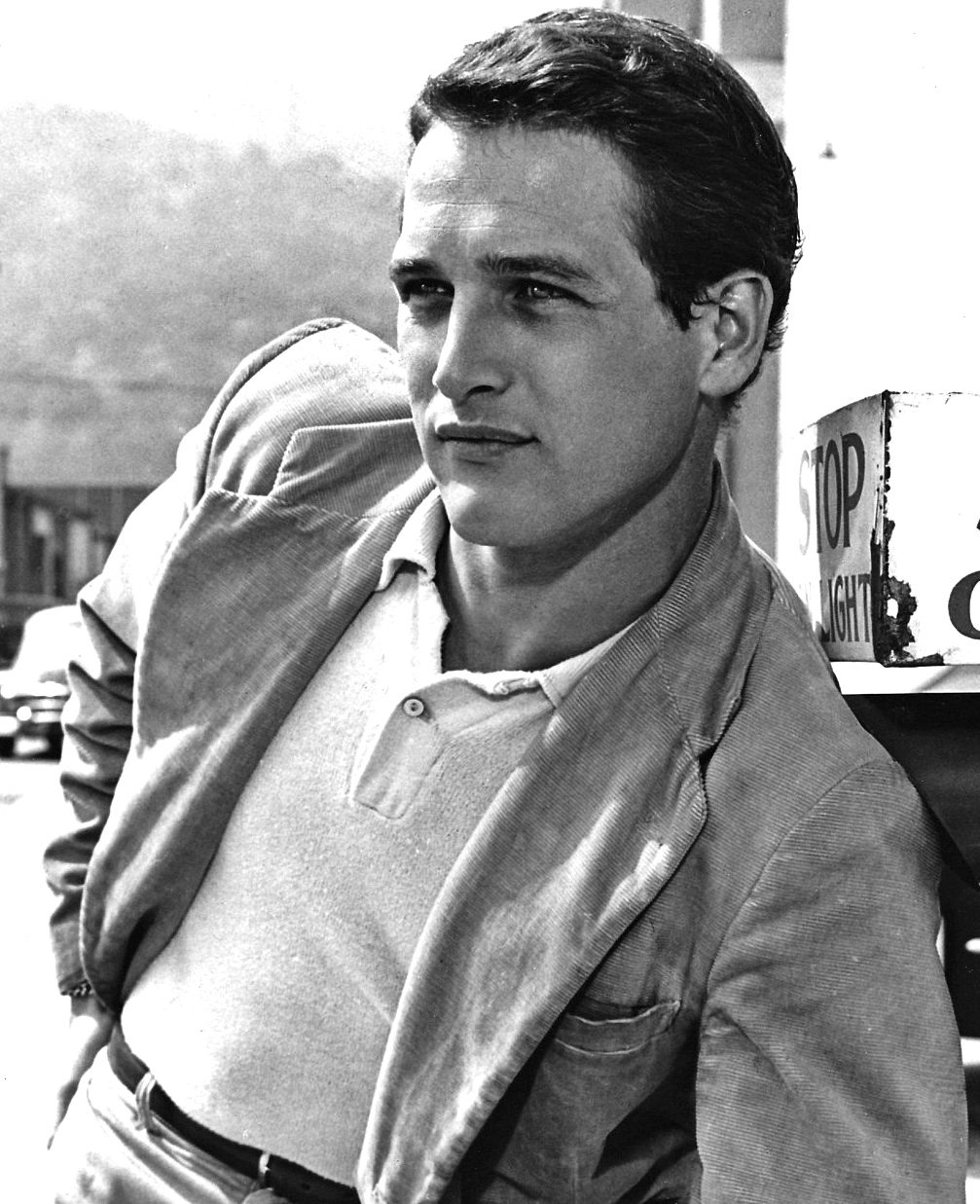
Paul Newman, a Kenyon College graduate, wearing casual Ivy League outfit in 1954, comprising chino pants, polo shirt, and sportcoat.

Ivy League is a style of men's dress, also known as Ivy Style, popular during the late 1950s in the Northeastern United States, and said to have originated on college campuses, particularly those of the Ivy League. It was the predecessor to the preppy style of dress.

== Origins ==
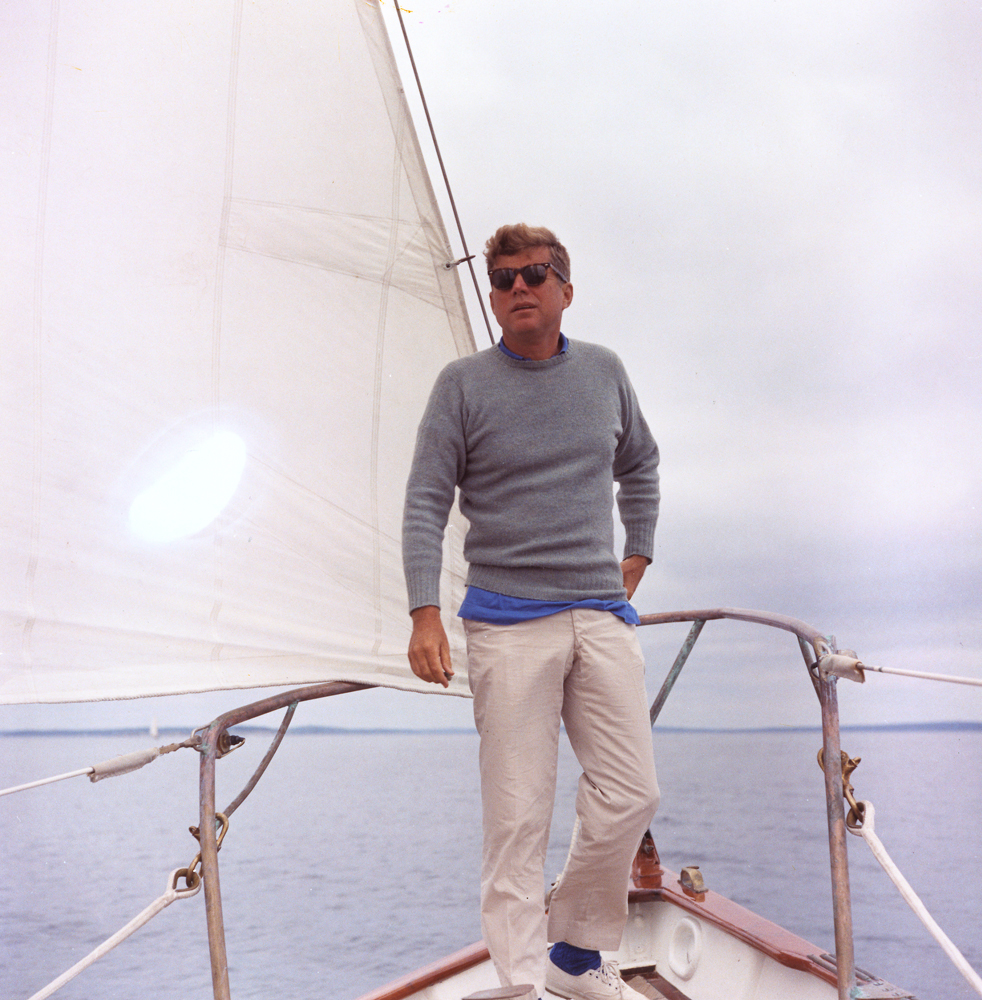
President John F. Kennedy, a style icon for followers of the Ivy League look.

The Ivy League style of dress evolved on the campuses of elite universities from the 1920s through the 1940s, and became mainstream in the 1950s. It was a casualization of traditional formal menswear and characteristically adapted the sporting attire of the British and American upper classes (most students at these universities being, or aspiring to be, upper class) as everyday wear. Clothing articles originally designed for golf, polo, sailing, rugby football, hunting, croquet, cricket, and tennis would be worn outside of the context of those activities. Such wardrobe staples as the sport coat, blazer, oxford shirt, and sweater vest all originated in the early 20th century as sportswear but became everyday attire through the Ivy subculture.

In terms of tailored clothing, the "sack" suit jacket (and similarly styled blazers and sport coats) was characteristic of the look. It featured a "3-to-2" or "three roll two" single-breasted front closure (3 buttons with the top button sewed on the underside of the roll of the lapel, leaving only two normally usable buttons), no front darts, and a single "hooked" vent (or "slit") at the back. The cut of the jacket was boxier, less structured, and less form-fitting than traditional business suits, and therefore appeared more relaxed. The trousers for suits cut in this style typically had a lower (but not low by modern standards) rise, were held up by a belt rather than suspenders, and were often not pleated or cuffed. Brooks Brothers and J. Press were major purveyors of Ivy League suits. In 1957 and 1958, about 70% of all suits sold were in the "Ivy League" style.

Notable early contributors to the look included the Duke of Windsor, who often combined American fashions with traditional British country clothing such as brogue boots, Argyle socks and jumpers (sweaters), tweed cloth sportcoats, Irish walking hats and plus fours in houndstooth, herringbone, or the Prince of Wales check popularized by Edward VII.. Many young college men adopted the Ivy League look due to this association with the upper classes at leisure.

Besides sportswear, some Ivy Style elements arose as a result of World War II. Double-breasted jackets, pleats, and trouser cuffs all fell out of style during the war period due to fabric rationing and shortages. Military surplus khaki cotton chino trousers became associated with Ivy Style in the late 1940's when returning veterans began attending college with their G.I. Bill benefits. Typical hairstyles included the crew cut, Harvard clip, and regular haircut, which were perhaps also influenced by military service. Hats began to fall out of style during this period.

Additionally, Ivy Style was largely characterized by casual style affectations. For example, Ivy leaguers would frequently wear button-down collar oxford cloth shirts (which were originally developed as sportswear for polo and tennis players) with suits and sport coats, rather than more formal dress shirts with starched collars and double cuffs. Likewise, they would wear penny loafers or brogues rather than oxford shoes. Other casual affectations might include wearing gray flannel or khaki chino pants with a sport jacket in situations where others might wear a suit, or wearing knitted silk or animal print ties with business suits.

== Mainstream popularity and decline ==
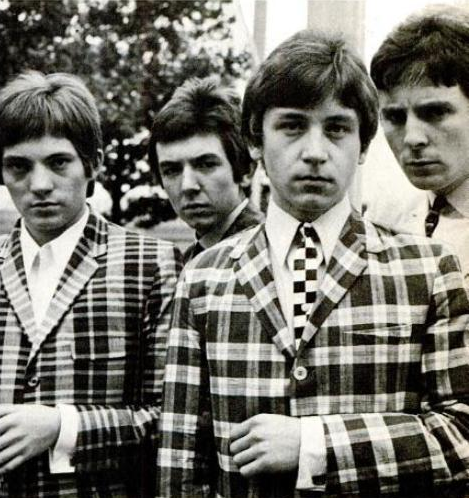
Mod band the Small Faces in 1965, wearing Ivy League cut sportcoats made up in outrageous plaids that were the antithesis of the understated Ivy League style, as were their long Beatle haircuts.

From the late 1950s until the mid 1960s, Ivy League clothing was considered desirable mainstream apparel for American middle class adults. In Britain during the early to mid 1960s, the Mod subculture combined the latest Italian fashions with the attire worn by the heroes in contemporary American films such as Steve McQueen and Paul Newman. Particularly popular were the grey flannel, Tonic, or houndstooth suits, polo shirts, chino pants, Argyle socks, sweater vests, cardigan sweaters, basketweave loafers, Madras plaid, and narrow brimmed Irish walking hats and Trilbys.

The style remained fashionable in the United States until it was supplanted (at least, for young men) at the tail end of the decade by the wide lapels, flared slacks, and brighter colors of the peacock revolution, as well as the casual clothing of the hippie counterculture during the late 1960s and early 1970s.

== Revival ==
Today the line between Ivy and preppy style is somewhat blurred but preppy style tends to be more colorful, especially in spring and summer, and incorporates more casual chic attire. It was first popularized in the early 1980s as a return to Ivy League styles after a decade of more modern trends. Preppy fashion is influenced by traditional collegiate trends, rather than reproducing them exactly, and various clothing items can be considered preppy based on how they are worn or accented. During the 1990s and 2000s, Polo Ralph Lauren, J. Crew, and Vineyard Vines were large marketers of preppy clothing, modernized to accommodate new trends inspired by indie pop and urban fashion. A version of this style is sometimes promoted and marketed as "American Trad" or simply "Trad," although there are differences between the two styles: Trad is narrower in scope than the intermediate preppy style.

By the 2010s, many American preps opted to dress in a more classic, tailored style closer to the original Ivy League look. In the early to mid-2020s, it returned as the "Old Money Aesthetic."

Popular items include loafers, boat shoes or moccasins, sweaters (cable knit Aran sweaters, cricket pullovers, cardigans, etc.), Oxford shirts, wingtips, stripy polo shirts, khaki or pastel colored Vineyard Vines, Nantucket Reds, white or bright pastel color socks, colored jeans, baseball jackets, khaki cargo shorts, and tapered chinos. Blazers, especially those made from seersucker, had made a comeback as informal or smart casual wear by the mid 2010s, and the traditional two button style was updated with throwback styling inspired by The Great Gatsby.

== In popular culture ==
During the 1950s, the wealthy and clean cut Squares, Rahs and Socs (Soc being short for social) with their Ivy League clothes were the rivals to the working class Greaser subculture. The conflict between the two groups features in Grease, The Outsiders, Indiana Jones and the Kingdom of the Crystal Skull, and Cry-Baby. In a scene in The Godfather, set in 1946, Michael Corleone is derided as an unlikely assassin because he is a "college boy" who wears an "Ivy League suit." The style was parodied in Clark Gesner's song The Ivy League Look from the 1957–58 Princeton Triangle Club musical "After A Fashion".

== See also ==
- 1950s in Western fashion
- J. Press
- Ralph Lauren
- Paul Stuart
- Preppy
- Take Ivy
