= Popeye (magazine) =

Japanese men's fashion magazine

- Cover of the first issue (July 1976)
- Editorial Director: Ken Miyamoto
- Categories: Men's fashion magazine
- Frequency: Monthly
- Publisher: Magazine House Ltd.
- Founded: 1976
- First issue: July 1976
- Country: Japan
- Based in: Tokyo
- Language: Japanese
- Website: popeyemagazine.jp; magazineworld.jp/popeye

Popeye (stylized as POPEYE) is a monthly fashion and men's magazine published by Magazine House with the name licensed from King Features Syndicate. Founded in 1976, it is one of Japan's oldest magazines featuring articles about men's fashion. Its tagline is "Magazine for City Boys". The magazine introduced American youth culture to Japanese audiences and is Japan's longest-running men's fashion magazine.

== History and profile ==
=== Founding ===
Popeye was conceived in 1976 as a male counterpart to an an, Magazine House's successful women's magazine. The magazine emerged from the merger of two existing publications, Ski Life and Made in U.S.A. According to cultural historian W. David Marx, founding editor Jirō Ishikawa originally wanted to name the publication "City Boys" before settling on Popeye.

The first issue appeared in July 1976 and featured the fashion trends of Los Angeles. Art director Seiichi Horiuchi created the logo in 1976 and designed every issue throughout the decade. Yoshihisa Kinameri served as the launch editor.

=== Publishing details ===
The publisher is Magazine House Ltd., a Tokyo-based publishing company. The company, originally named Heibon Shuppan, founded the magazine in 1976.

The magazine was initially published biweekly before transitioning to monthly publication. Popeye covers fashion, clothing, accessories, bags, and shoes, and targets young, educated urban men.

=== Competition and decline ===
Following Popeye's success, publisher Kodansha launched Hot-Dog Press in 1979 as a direct competitor and "nearly identical rip-off". In 1982, Hot-Dog Press outsold Popeye for the first time. By 1991, Hot-Dog Press reported greater sales than Popeye, which had a circulation of 700,000.

Both Popeye and Hot-Dog Press struggled by the mid-1990s as readers became less interested in magazines that dictated fashion trends.

=== Editorial leadership and redesign ===
In 2012, Takahiro Kinoshita became editor-in-chief and initiated a magazine redesign. Circulation grew to 100,000 during his tenure. Kinoshita left his position in 2018 to join Fast Retailing as an executive officer.

== Cultural impact and recognition ==
Other Magazine House titles include an an, Brutus, and Croissant. In 2013, both Popeye and Brutus received the Fifth Best Magazine Award.

The magazine celebrated its 40th anniversary in July 2016 with a special issue that included a complete reprint of the original 1976 edition. The anniversary included collaborations with major fashion retailers, including a limited collection with BEAMS celebrating both brands' 40th anniversaries.

== Circulation and publication ==
In 1999, Popeye reported a circulation of 220,000. As of 2024, the magazine continues monthly publication with digital editions and an online store.
