= Magazine House =

Japanese publishing company

- Founded: October 10, 1945
- Founder: Kinosuke Iwahori; Tatsuo Shimizu
- Country of origin: Japan
- Headquarters location: 3-13-10 Ginza, Chuo, Tokyo, Japan
- Revenue: 14,853 million yen (FY09/11)
- No. of employees: 193 (January 2021)
- Official website: magazineworld.jp

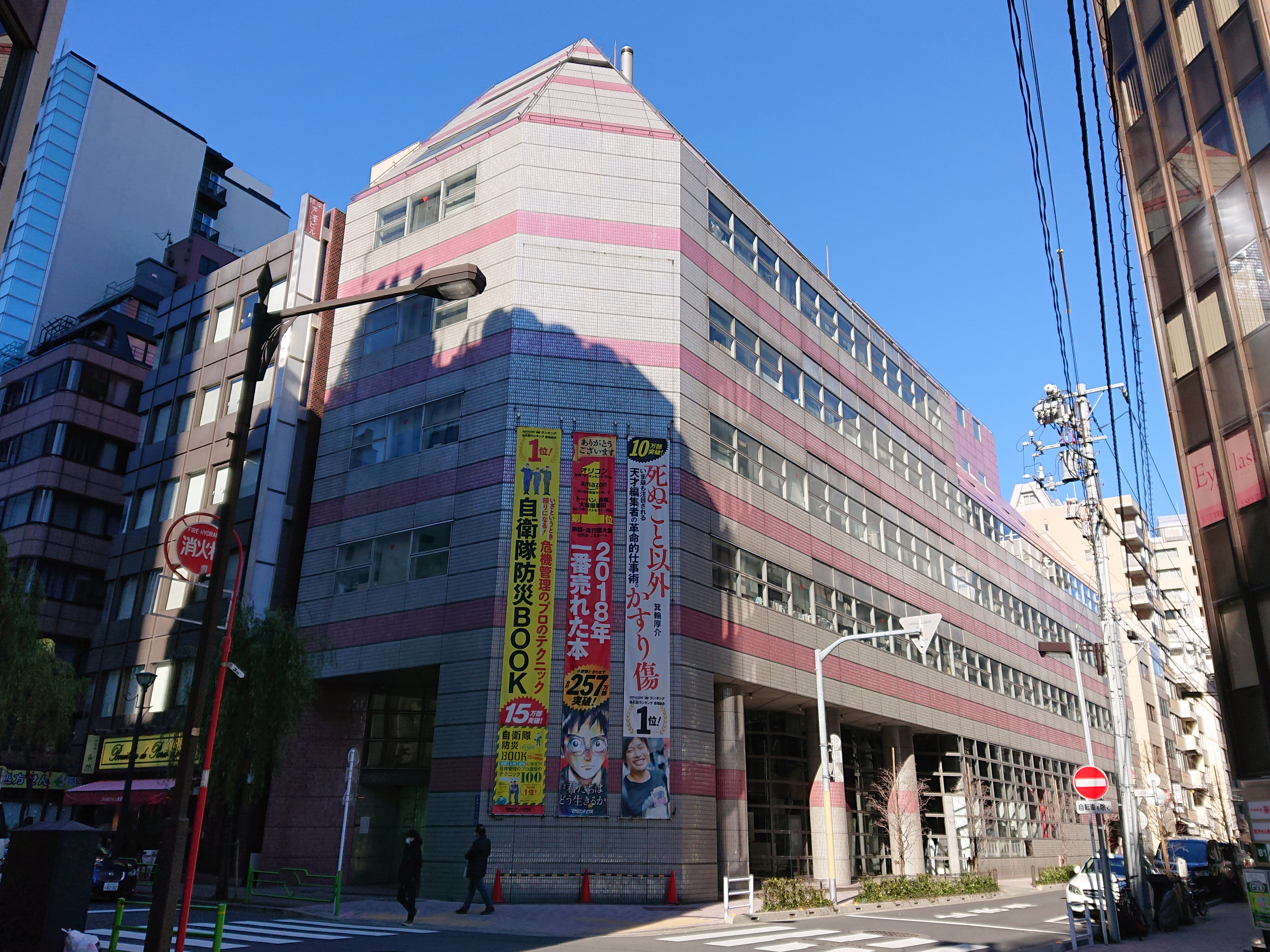
Magazine House headquarters, Ginza, Tokyo

Magazine House Ltd. (株式会社マガジンハウス, Kabushikigaisha Magajinhausu) is a Japanese publisher, formerly named Heibon Shuppan Co., Ltd.

== History ==
The company was founded in October 1945 by Kinosuke Iwahori and Tatsuo Shimizu. Its first publications were the magazines Heibon and Heibon Weekly. In 1964, it launched the influential men's magazine Heibon Punch.

Some of Magazine House's publications include:

- an-an (women's fashion and lifestyle magazine; est. 1970)
- Croissant (women's magazine; est. 1977)
- Popeye (men's fashion magazine; est. 1976)
- Brutus (men's lifestyle magazine; est. 1980)
- Hanako (women's magazine; est. 1988)
