= An An =

Japanese weekly women's magazine

- Model Marita Gissy on the cover of the first issue
- Categories: Women's magazine
- Frequency: Weekly
- Publisher: Magazine House Ltd.
- First issue: 20 March 1970
- Country: Japan
- Based in: Tokyo
- Language: Japanese
- Website: ananweb.jp; magazineworld.jp/anan/

An An (stylized as an an) is a weekly Japanese women's lifestyle magazine. It is one of the earliest and popular women's magazines in Japan. In 2009 it was described by Japan Today as a mega-popular women's magazine. It is also one of the best-selling women's magazines in the country.

== History and profile ==
The magazine was started as a sister publication of French magazine Elle and was named as Elle Japon. The first issue of the magazine was published on 20 March 1970. The magazine was renamed as an an in 1982, which was the name of a panda bear. Its content was also changed to reflect the trends affecting Japanese women and their self-identity.

At the end of the 1990s an an was published biweekly. The magazine has its headquarters in Tokyo and is published on a weekly basis on Tuesdays. The publisher is Magazine House Ltd., a Tokyo-based publishing company. The company, which was also the founder of the magazine, was formerly named Heibun Shuppan. The magazine has two versions, a regular one and a cheaper one.

Like other young women's magazines in Japan an an frequently features articles on fashion, cosmetics and relationships. On the other hand, it emphasizes the visual aspect and advertisements rather than text. However, instead of focusing on gossip, an an and another women's magazine Non-no provide their readers with self-help materials. In addition, since its inception an an has been instrumental in changing attitudes of young Japanese women as well as in reinforcing new and subversive identities. In 1984 it began to publish an annual sex special issue. Its April 1989 cover read "Become Beautiful through Sex" (sekkusu de kirei ni naru).

In the mid-1990s the target audience of an an was stated to be women aged between 19 and 27 years old who were mostly unmarried, office workers and university students.

an an celebrated its publication of 2,000 issues with an exhibition at the Tokyo Metro Omotesando station between 11 April and 17 April 2016.

== Circulation ==
The circulation of an an was between 540,000 copies and 720,000 copies in the period of 1970 and 2009. In the mid-1990s the magazine sold 650,000 copies. In 2006 its circulation was 280,683 copies.
