= List of Uji Shūi Monogatari stories =

The following is a partial list of stories from the collection Uji Shūi Monogatari written around the 13th century. They are listed individually in order of their respective designation in the collection (volume # / story # in volume) followed by a short summary. Note that some stories may have two parts.

Collection Listing	Summary	Notes
1/1	Every night, the holy teacher Domyo reads the Lotus Sutra to his secret lover, Izumi Shikibu. One night, Domyo is visited by a roadside deity who tells him that every other night it was too crowded for him to attend, because divine beings such as Brahma and Indra always gathered around to listen to the teacher reading. The only reason the roadside deity could get close to him tonight was because there was no crowd; the holy teacher forgot to cleanse himself before his reading, resulting in the divine beings abandoning him.	
1/2	Shimomura, a place in the Tanba Province, is filled with a crop of strange mushrooms. One night, all the townspeople simultaneously dream of several old priests announcing that they are leaving and afterwards, the villagers discover all the mushrooms in the land are gone.	
1/3	An old man (with a huge facial wen) hiding in a tree for cover from a storm is visited by a pack of oni who surround the tree and start dancing. The old man gets excited and jumps out of the tree to dance too, impressing the oni so much they demand he return later and rip off his wen as insurance. Another old man hears the story and tries to recreate the circumstances, but ends up with two wens on his face.	*Predecessor to the Kobutori Jiisan tale.
1/4	Ban Major Counsellor Yoshio, a retainer of the district governor in Sado, dreams of himself straddling between Todaiji and Saidaiji temples. He wife predicts that he will be split in two from the crotch up. He visits the district governor (an expert physiognomist) to get the real meaning.	
1/5	A shugenja has a mark on his forehead which he claims is the sign of the bodhisattva Zuigu. A young retainer recognizes the shugenja and reveals that the "mark" is actually a scar; the shugenja received it when he was attacked by the angry husband of a noblewoman he seduced.	
1/6	Middle Counsellor Morotoki is visited by a monk who announces that he has no phallus. The suspicious counsellor orders his retainers to restrain the monk and massage his hairy crotch. Eventually an erect phallus shoots up; the monk had just put extra hair over it to make it look like it was gone.	
1/7	To protest the murder of innocent animals, a holy man of Ryōmon-ji dresses himself in the hide of a stag and waits in the forest for a hunter to shoot him.	
1/8	A random traveller and his retainers arrive at a run down house seeking hospitality. The woman who lives there serves them but refuses to let them leave. She claims that several months ago, her father (a diviner) foretold the traveler and his retainers would arrive owing her 1000 taels of gold, and she insists they pay up.	
1/9	Lord Fujiwara no Yorimichi is taken ill near Kaya Palace and the High Priest Shin'yo sends his goho doji to exorcize him.	
1/10	Lord Michitoshi, the Minister of Civil Administration, takes a moment to criticize Hata Kanehisa's poetry. Kanehisa turns the table and criticizes Michitoshi's poetry in response.	
1/11	Major Counsellor Masatoshi Minamoto sponsors a Buddhist service where priests ring the sacred bell to certify their lifelong chastity. But one of the monks is unsure of his eligibility, having played with himself the night before.	
1/12	A young lad serving in the monastery on Mount Hiei feints sleep while his fellow monks busily make riceballs.	
1/13	A monk living on Mount Hiei finds a young boy sobbing at the sight of cherry blossoms falling, or so it seems...	
1/14	Kotouda, a servant of Lord Sadafusa, unexpectedly runs into his erect, horny son-in-law, which gives him quite a scare.	
1/15	A young apprentice boy steals salmon from a traveling fish merchant in Awataguchi. The fish merchant recovers his merchandise, but can't escape being the butt of a naughty joke.	
1/16	In Tango Province, a trickster fools an old nun into thinking she will meet the Bodhisattva Jizo by leading her to the house of a young boy named "Jizo".	
1/17	A priest spending the night in an old deserted temple in Hizen Province encounters a procession of oni, one of whom mistakes him for Fudo Myoo.	
1/18	Goi, a retainer of General Toshihito, can never get enough yam gruel. To "satisfy" his desire, General Toshihito takes him on a strange adventure involving magical kitsune and more yam gruel than he could ever hope to consume in his life.	
2/7	Zenchin the monk has an enormous nose (about five or six inches) which houses white worms and gets in the way of his food. One of his students attempts to hold it up for him to eat, with humorous consequences.	*Inspiration for Akutagawa Ryūnosuke's short story "The Nose"
2/8	Abe no Seimei spends the night defending a young chamberlain from a curse sent by an enemy onmyoji's shikigami.	*Served as an inspiration for Hiroshi Aramata's novel Teito Monogatari
3/4	A haughty shugenja named Keitoubou is denied a free ride by a ferry in Koutaki. In revenge, he uses his magic to overturn the boat and drown its occupants.	
3/6	The home of a painter of Buddhist images called Ryoshū catches fire. He manages to flee, but leaves behind his wife and children and watches how the flames engulf the house in astonishment and fascination, exclaiming now and then how beautiful the fire is and how badly he had been painting it until now. Since he shows no feelings toward his family inside, his neighbours think him crazy or possessed by an evil spirit, but he just calls them commoners without any talent.	*Inspiration for Akutagawa Ryūnosuke's short story "Hell Screen"
3/15	A young woman living in Kyoto dies in her home. But every time her family attempt to bury her, her body magically reappears back in the same spot she died. In response, her family buries her under the house and vacates the establishment.	
3/16	An old woman cares for a wounded sparrow, who supplies her with a magical seed which grows into a tree sprouting gourds filled with rice. A jealous neighbor attempts the same feat by intentionally injuring a sparrow and caring for it. In return, the seed she is given grows a tree sprouting bitter tasting gourds filled with poisonous snakes and insects.	*See also: "Shita-kiri Suzume"
3/17	Ono Takamura is ordered to read aloud a disrespectful letter he wrote to Emperor Saiga. In response, Saiga writes down 12 times in succession a degrading message about Takamura, and orders him to also read that aloud for his amusement.	
3/18	Taira Sadabumi, an assistant captain of the guards, tries in vain to woo the heart of Hon'in no Jiju, a maid to the mother of Emperor Murakami. Sadabumi even goes so far as visiting her house in the midst of deadly rainstorm, but even this fails to earn her respect. In despair, Sadabumi tries to break his fascination with her by exposing himself to one of her soiled chamber pots.	
4/16	Holy Teacher Ryoenbo recites a passage from the Lotus Sutra while passing near Lake Biwa. A voice from the lake responds to him, soon revealed to be emanating from the ghost of assistant High Priest Jitsun. Ryoenbo and Jitsun converse about the scriptures, but Ryoenbo finds many errors in Jitsun's facts. Jitsun explains to Ryoenbo that such discrepancies are the result of having been dead for so long.	
4/17	To get an ordination hall built on Mt. Hiei, the High Priest Jie accepts a challenge to catch flying soybeans with his chopsticks.	
6/1	After his death, Fujiwara no Hitokata is summoned down to hell to bear audience to the court of King Yama. Yama explains that Hitotaka's late wife has insisted that Hitokata join her in hell as punishment for his not having prayed for her salvation during his life. Hitotaka decides to strike a deal with his late wife and Yama: if Yama allows him to return to life, he will have all the sutras copied and dedicated on his wife's behalf so that she can attain salvation.	
6/2	In Seson-ji, Major Counsellor Fujiwara Morouji passes away after celebrating his newly earned status as Captain of the Guards. After his death, his former residence is given to Fujiwara Koretada. Soon after, the body of an old nun is discovered buried in the yard of the residence. A gust of wind hits the corpse, causing it to dissolve into a cloud of multicolored dust. Soon after, the new owner of the residence grows ill and dies.	
6/3	In India, a rich man named Rushi travels to the Heart of the Mountains to pray to the God of Frugality. In the meantime, the god Indra disguises himself as Rushi and gives out all his wealth to his friends and family. Rushi returns home, discovers what has happened, and attempts to convince everyone of the imposter's identity, going so far as to take the case up to the Buddha himself.	
6/4	A young samurai devotes all his spare time to making pilgrimages to Kiyomizu Shrine. During a high-stakes game of backgammon, he loses to a rival samurai. Having no money, he can only offer him the spiritual merit of having made 2000 trips to Kiyomizu Shrine in writing. His opponent accepts the samurai's offer. Soon after, the samurai's life goes downhill while his opponent's life prospers.	
6/7	A man living near Tsukuma Hot Springs has a dream one night in which he is told that the springs will receive a visit from Kannon, who will assume the form of a hunter. The very next day, a young man perfectly resembling the hunter described in the dream visits the springs and finds crowds of people waiting for him. The multitude convince the young hunter that he is indeed Kannon, prompting him to turn to a life of religion in response.	
6/8	In China, an old traveler encounters Confucius near a small hillock. But the traveler is not impressed with the sage, and reprimands him for his ways, arguing that those who try to meddle in the affairs of the world are foolish.	
6/9	Sokyata and his crewmates get swept away to the island of the man eating rakshasis. They escape using a magical white horse sent by Kannon. One of the rakshasa pursues Sokyata to him homeland, where she seduces and eventually devours the Emperor. In retribution, Sokyata gathers a regiment of 200 soldiers and sails back to the island to destroy all the rakshasis once and for all.	
7/1	A deer with a brilliant hide made up of 5 different colors rescues a man from a drowning. In response, the man promises to keep the deer's existence and whereabouts a secret. But the man breaks the promise when he informs the Emperor, who covets the hide for himself. The Emperor takes a hunting party to find the deer's hideout. They corner the beast, which pleads for his life, explaining that the man had betrayed his promise. The Emperor is so moved by the animal's story that he changes his mind, returns home, captures and executes the treacherous man instead.	
8/3	A flying begging bowl, sent by a powerful monk on Mount Shigi, lifts a rich man's storehouse off the ground and carries it to the top of the mountain. In the meantime Emperor Daigo becomes ill, and the government commissions the monk to cure him. In his dreams, the Emperor is visited by the specter of the monk's Sword Guardian and is instantly cured.	
9/1	While visiting a magistrate in Shinano Province; Michinori, an imperial guard, sleeps with a strange woman that causes men to lose their phalluses. The magistrate restores Michinori's phallus and offers to teach him magic.	*This story is also in the Konjaku Monogatarishu
9/7	A chamberlain courting the abbott of Daian-ji's daughter dreams all the members of the household are drinking cups of molten copper.	
11/3i	An old monk with two shikigami (assuming the forms of young boys) arrives at the house of Abe no Seimei to test him. Seimei realizes he is being tested and dispels the shiki with his magic. The old monk is so impressed, he begs Seimei to accept him as a student.	
11/3ii	Gossiping monks challenge Abe no Seimei to kill a frog with magic. He throws a blade of grass at a nearby frog, which dies instantly.	
11/6	A monk living in the Nara Prefecture named E'in (who has a big red nose) tries to trick people into believing that a dragon will arise from Sarusawa pond.	*Inspiration for Ryūnosuke Akutagawa's short story "Dragon: the Old Potter's Tale"
13/6	A fleeing robber takes hostage the sister of Oi Mitsutou, an immensely strong wrestler from the Kai Province. The robber soon learns that the sister is in fact the stronger of the two siblings.	
13/10	The Chinese persecution of Buddhism under Emperor Wuzong of Tang forces the monk Ennin (Jikkaku Daishi) to flee the land. Along the way, he discovers a strange isolated compound where human victims are drugged with black rice grains and drained of blood to make tie-dyed stuffs.	
14/10	Regent Fujiwara no Michinaga's dog senses a cursed item buried under the grounds of Hōjō-ji Temple. Abe no Seimei sends out his shikigami to find the man who placed the curse, and it turns out to be a monk employed by Lord Akimitsu, the Minister of the Left.	
14/11	In Kyushu, the younger brother of Takashima Shumpei encounters a Chinese man who is a master of "san" (stick divination) magic. The Chinese man agrees to teach Shumpei's brother the secrets of magic if he accompanies him to China. When the brother fails to join him, the Chinese man curses him. Despite the handicap, the young man can still impress the peasants with the magic he has learned.	
15/6	Chancellor Lord Mototsune is struck with an illness. A monk from Gokuraku-ji (Kamakura) chants a powerful sutra, causing Mototsune to dream of himself being saved by gohou douji.	
15/8	Soo, a monk of Mudoji on Mount Hiei, invokes Fudō-myōō to carry him to the gates of the Inner Sanctum in the Tosotsu Heaven to become enlightened (a process which requires him to memorize the Lotus Sutra). Afterwards, he becomes a miracle healer and is called to save the Somedomo Empress, who is tormented by an evil spirit. He does this by magically spanking the Empress until the spirit vacates.	

== Sources ==
- Mills, D.E. A collection of tales from Uji: a study and translation of Uji shūi monogatari. Cambridge, University Press. 1970.
- Tyler, Royall. Japanese Tales. Pantheon Fairy Tale and Folklore Library: Pantheon Books, New York. 1987
