= Philipp Mainländer =

German philosopher and poet (1841–1876)

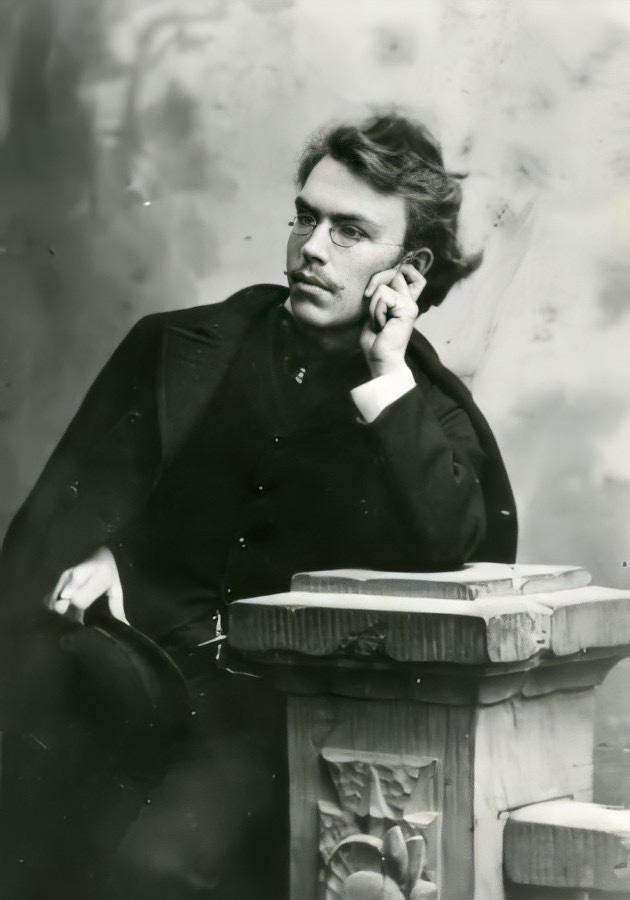
- Mainländer in 1876
- Born: Philipp Batz; 5 October 1841; Offenbach am Main, Grand Duchy of Hesse German Confederation
- Died: 1 April 1876 (aged 34); Offenbach am Main, Grand Duchy of Hesse, German Empire
- Cause of death: Suicide by hanging
- Resting place: Neuer Friedhof Offenbach (Offenbach Cemetery), Offenbach

Education
- Education: Commercial school of Dresden

Philosophical work
- Era: 19th-century philosophy
- Region: Western philosophy
- School: Continental philosophy; Post-Kantian philosophy; Metaphysical voluntarism; Post-Schopenhauerian pessimism; Pluralism
- Main interests: Aesthetics; epistemology; metaphysics; theodicy; ethics
- Notable works: Die Philosophie der Erlösung (The Philosophy of Redemption)
- Notable ideas: Critique of the Schopenhauerian philosophy; The movement of the universe is towards nothingness; God is dead; The will to death (Wille zum Tode); Finitude of the universe

Philipp Mainländer (German: [ˈmaɪ̯nlɛndɐ]; 5 October 1841 – 1 April 1876) was a German philosopher and poet. Born Philipp Batz, he later changed his name to "Mainländer" in homage to his hometown, Offenbach am Main. Mainländer is best known for his pessimistic cosmic philosophy, deeply influenced by Arthur Schopenhauer.

In his central work, The Philosophy of Redemption (Die Philosophie der Erlösung, 1876), Mainländer argued that non-existence is preferable to existence, positing that the universe originated from a primordial divine fragmentation, that God committed cosmic suicide by shattering himself into the time-bound, fragmented physical matter. Mainländer believed that everything in life, matter, and celestial bodies is the decaying corpse of this original entity driven by a cosmic "will to die", challenging Schopenhauer's "will to live" and is steadily progressing toward absolute nothingness.

Driven by his philosophical conviction that individual annihilation aligns with the universe's ultimate goal, Mainländer hanged himself on April 1, 1876, the day after the publication of his masterwork, believing it was the literal and ultimate fulfilment of his own philosophy. According to Theodor Lessing, "perhaps the most radical system of pessimism known to philosophical literature" (Note: "vielleicht das radikalste System des Pessimismus, das die philosophische Literatur kennt") – Mainländer proclaims that life is of negative value, and that "the will, ignited by the knowledge that non-being is better than being, is the supreme principle of morality." (Note: "[der] von der Erkenntnis, daß Nichtsein besser ist als Sein, entzündete Wille [ist] das oberste Prinzip aller Moral.")

== Biography ==
=== Early life and career ===
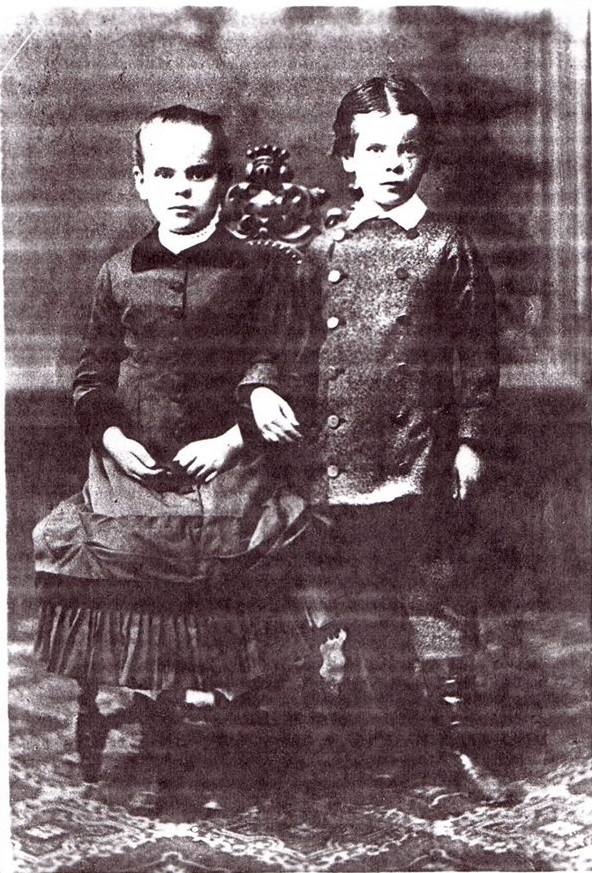
Mainländer with his sister Minna in 1855

Born in Offenbach am Main, on 5 October 1841 "as a child of marital rape", (Note: "als Kind ehelicher Notzucht") Philipp Mainländer grew up the youngest of six siblings. One of his brothers was mentally ill, according to Cesare Lombroso in The Man of Genius; as was his grandfather, who died of suicide at the age of 33.

Mainländer attended the Realschule in Offenbach from 1848 to 1856. In 1856, at his father's instruction, he entered the commercial school of Dresden to become a merchant. The following year, his older brother, Daniel Batz, committed suicide, cementing the family history of succumbing to mental illness. In 1858, Philipp was employed in a trading house in Naples, Italy, where he learned Italian and acquainted himself with the works of Dante, Petrarca, Boccaccio, and – most notably – Leopardi. Mainländer would later describe his five Neapolitan years as the happiest years of his life.

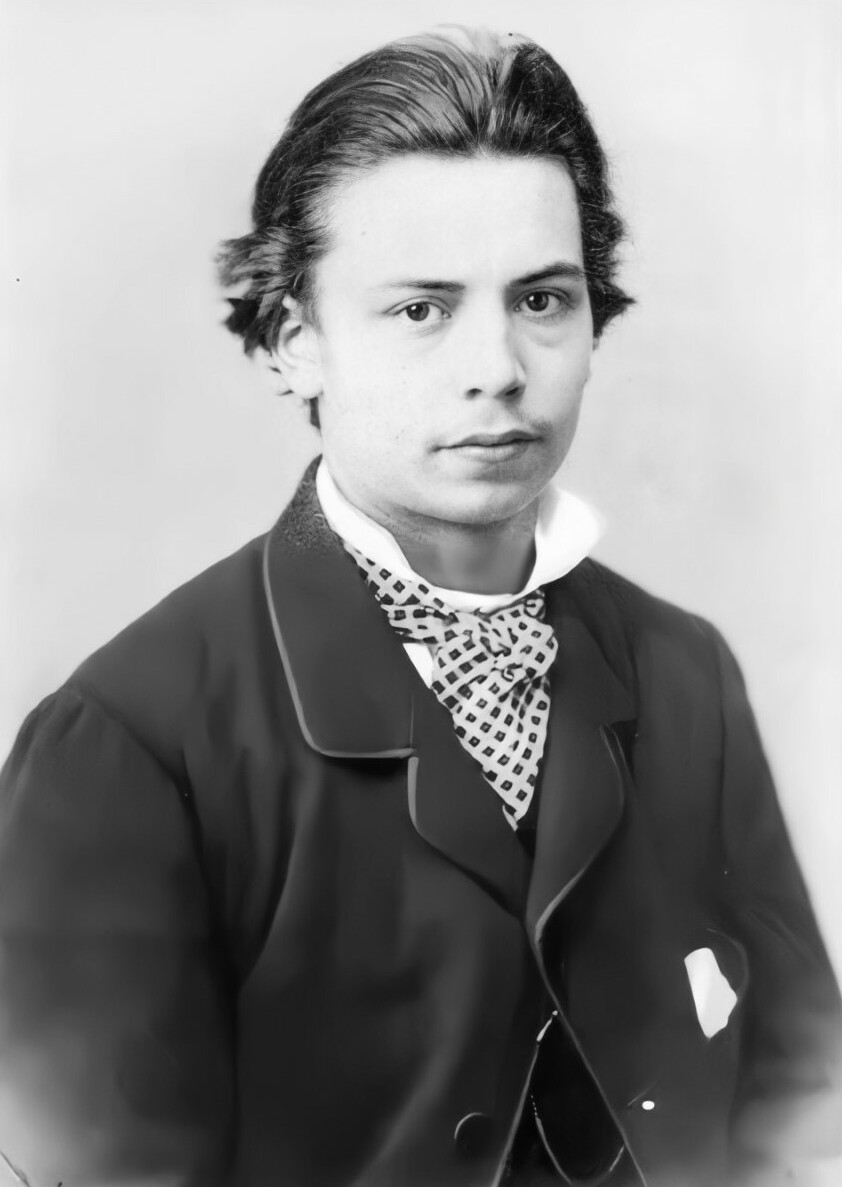
Mainländer age 25–26, c. 1867

During this critical period of his life, Mainländer discovered Arthur Schopenhauer's central work The World as Will and Representation. Nineteen years old at the time, he would later describe the event as a penetrating revelation, referring to February 1860 as the "most important of [his] life". (Note: "[den] bedeutungsvollsten Tag [seines] Lebens") Indeed, Schopenhauer would remain the most important influence on Mainländer's later philosophical work.

In 1863, Mainländer returned to Germany to work in his father's business. In the same year, he also penned the three-part poem Die letzten Hohenstaufen ("The Last Hohenstaufens"). Two years later, on 5 October, Mainländer's 24th birthday, his mother died. Deeply affected by this experience of loss, Mainländer began an ongoing turn away from poetry and towards philosophy. During the following years, he studied Schopenhauer, Kant – ("not poisoned through Fichte, Schelling and Hegel, but rather critically strengthened through Schopenhauer"), (Note: "nicht durch Fichte, Schelling und Hegel vergiftet, sondern vielmehr durch Schopenhauer kritisch gestählt") Eschenbach's Parzival, and the classics of philosophy from Heraclitus to Condillac.

In March 1869, Mainländer worked in the banking house J. Mart. Magnus in Berlin with the declared goal of amassing a small fortune within a few years and then leading a decent life from the interest earnings. However, on May 8, 1873, the stock market crash at the Wiener Börse caused a sudden end to these plans. Consequently, Mainländer resigned from his post at the bank.

=== Development of Die Philosophie der Erlösung ===
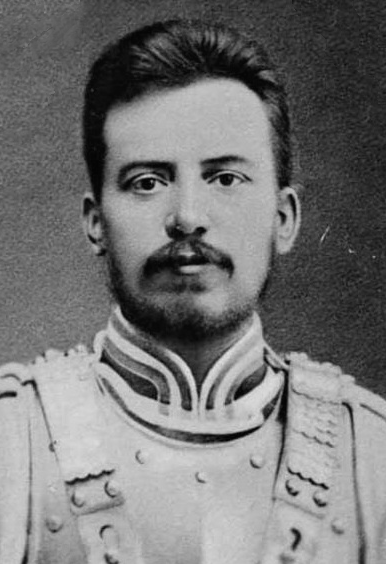
Mainländer, in 1875, wearing his military uniform

Although his wealthy parents had bought off his military service in 1861, Mainländer – according to an autobiographic note – expressed the desire "to be absolutely in all things submitted to another one once, to do the lowermost work, to have to obey blindly" (Note: "einmal unbedingt einem anderen in allem unterworfen zu sein, die niedrigste Arbeit zu tun, blind gehorchen zu müssen") and sedulously undertook numerous attempts to serve with weapons. On 6 April 1874, Mainländer, already 32 years old, submitted a request directly to the emperor Wilhelm I of Germany which was granted; this resulted in his appointment to the Cuirassiers in Halberstadt, beginning 28 September. During the four months leading up to his conscription, Mainländer, obsessed with work, composed the first volume of his main work Die Philosophie der Erlösung. Describing this time, he later wrote:

And now an enchanting life began, a spiritual blossoming full of bliss and blissful shivers. [...] This life lasted four full months; it filled June, July, August and September. Completely clear, consistent, and well-rounded was my system in my mind, and a creative frenzy revived me that did not need the whip of the thought that I must be finished by 28 September; for on 1 October I had to put on the king's coat - this date could not be postponed. If I hadn't finished by then, it would take three years for me to put the finishing touches on my work, i.e. I would have seen myself thrown into an abyss into which the furies of a broken existence would inevitably have thrown me.

Mainländer handed the completed manuscript to his sister Minna, asking her to find a publisher while he completed his military service. The author composed a letter to the as-yet-unknown publisher, requesting the omission of his birth name and substitution of the pen name "Philipp Mainländer", and stating that he would abhor nothing more than "being exposed to the eyes of the world". (Note: "als den Augen der Welt ausgesetzt zu sein")

On 1 November 1875, Mainländer – originally committed for three years, but in the meantime, as he noted in a letter to Minna, "exhausted, worked-out, ... at completely ... healthy body ineffably tired" (Note: "verbraucht, worked out, … bei vollkommen … gesundem Körper unaussprechlich müde") – was prematurely released from military service, and traveled back to his hometown of Offenbach, where he – again having become obsessed with work – within a mere two months, corrected the unbound sheets of Die Philosophie der Erlösung, composed his memoirs, wrote the novella Rupertine del Fino, and completed the 650-page second volume of his magnum opus.

=== Death ===
Around the beginning of 1876, Mainländer began to doubt whether his life still had value for humanity. He wondered whether he had already completed the duties of life, or whether he should employ it to strengthen the social democratic movement. Despite writing down addresses to the German workers, these plans did not materialize. During the night of 1 April, in his Offenbach apartment in Waldstraße 13, and very shortly after the publication of the first volume of his main work, Mainländer hanged himself. He was buried in Offenbach cemetery.

His older sister, Minna Batz, whom was Mainländer’s closest confident and was also his co-helper and co-thinker together they had co-authored works such as the 300-page poem The Last Hohenstaufens. She was charged with writing a memoir of her brother and later compiled his legacy, drafted his memoirs, and published the crucial second volume of his magnum opus; being deeply influenced by her brother's philosophy, she adopted the name Melancholia Mainländer, actively embracing the deep-seated existential death wish that Philipp championed in his work. She later followed him through suicide in 1891, 15 years after her brother's philosophical conclusion.

== Philosophy ==
Title page of the second volume of Die Philosophie der Erlösung

Working in the metaphysical framework of Schopenhauer, Mainländer sees the "will" as the innermost core of being, the ontological arche. However, he deviates from Schopenhauer in important respects. With Schopenhauer, the will is singular, unified and beyond time and space. Schopenhauer's transcendental idealism leads him to conclude that we only have access to a certain aspect of the thing-in-itself by introspective observation of our own bodies. What we observe as will is all there is to observe, nothing more. There are no hidden aspects. Furthermore, via introspection, we can only observe our individual will. This also leads Mainländer to the philosophical position of pluralism. The goals he set for himself and for his system are reminiscent of ancient Greek philosophy: what is the relation between the undivided existence of the "One" and the ever-changing world of becoming that we experience.

Additionally, Mainländer accentuates on the idea of salvation for all of creation. This is yet another respect in which he differentiates his philosophy from that of Schopenhauer. With Schopenhauer, the silencing of the will is a rare event. The artistic genius can achieve this state temporarily, while only a few saints have achieved total cessation throughout history. For Mainländer, the entirety of the cosmos is slowly but surely moving towards the silencing of the will to live and to (as he calls it) "redemption".

Mainländer theorized that an initial singularity dispersed and expanded into the known universe. This dispersion from a singular unity to a multitude of things offered a smooth transition between monism and pluralism. Mainländer thought that with the regression of time, all kinds of pluralism and multiplicity would revert to monism and he believed that, with his philosophy, he had managed to explain this transition from oneness to multiplicity and becoming.

=== Death of God ===
Despite his scientific means of explanation, Mainländer was not afraid to philosophize in allegorical terms. Formulating his own "myth of creation", Mainländer equated this initial singularity with God. This view is called Pandeism.

Mainländer reinterprets Schopenhauer's metaphysics in two important aspects. Primarily, in Mainländer's system, there is no "singular will". The basic unity has broken apart into individual wills and each subject in existence possesses an individual will of his own. Because of this, Mainländer can claim that once an "individual will" is silenced and dies, it achieves absolute nothingness and not the relative nothingness we find in Schopenhauer. By recognizing death as salvation and by giving nothingness an absolute quality, Mainländer's system manages to offer "wider" means for redemption. Secondarily, Mainländer reinterprets the Schopenhauerian will to live as an underlying will to die, i.e. the will to live is the means towards the will to die.

=== Ethics ===
Mainländer's philosophy also carefully inverts other doctrines. For instance, Epicurus sees happiness only in pleasure and since there is nothing after death, there is nothing to fear and/or desire from death. Yet Mainländer, being a philosophical pessimist, sees no desirable pleasure in this life and praises the sublime nothingness of death, recognizing precisely this state of non-existence as desirable.

Mainländer espouses an ethics of egoism; that is to say that what is best for an individual is what makes one happiest. Yet all pursuits and cravings lead to pain; thus, Mainländer concludes that a will to death is best for the happiness of all and knowledge of this transforms one's will to life (an illusory existence unable to attain happiness) into the proper (sought by God) will to death. Ultimately, the subject (individual will) is one with the universe, in harmony with it and with its originating will, if one wills nothingness. Based on these premises, Mainländer makes the distinction between the "ignorant" and the "enlightened" type of self-interest. Ignorant self-interest seeks to promote itself and capitalize on its will to live. In contrast, enlightened self-interest humbles the individual and leads him to asceticism, as that aligns him properly with the elevating will towards death.

== Personality ==
It was noted by critics that his work reveals a gentle and warmhearted personality. Lucien Arréat expressed that many pages feel warm due to the "generosity of his soul", and, as a more general characterization, that "Mainländer had a delicate and sincere nature, a truly remarkable individuality."

On every page of his work emerges such a gentle, human-friendly image, who can speak in such a gentle yet serious tone, can smile so sublimely, that – it sounds contradictory to his teachings, but it is true – express such a devout soul, that we, deeply moved, kindly nod to his work, making us confess: you may not convert us to your redemption, but we can and we have to understand you, you pure, noble heart!

— Fritz Sommerlad

Frederick C. Beiser also notes "Mainländer's humanity": "He had the deepest sympathy for the suffering of the common man and much of his thinking was preoccupied with the poverty of the mass of people and the workers. ... It is not the least token of Mainländer's humanity that he was sympathetic to the Jews, whose charity and sagacity he much admired."

== Politics and political life ==
Philipp Mainländer critiques the moral quietism found in Schopenhauer's philosophy and early Buddhist thought, arguing that while these systems provide pathways for individual alleviation of suffering, they fall short of addressing the broader societal implications of existential suffering. He contends that such quietisms can perpetuate injustice by failing to empower those who lack the means to achieve personal moral development. For Mainländer, the ethical pursuit of personal goodness must be accompanied by a commitment to social justice, ensuring that all individuals have access to the education and resources necessary to develop an awareness of the negative value of life.

Central to Mainländer's activism is the belief that a truly pessimistic ethics must advocate for the dismantling of social and political structures that perpetuate inequality and suffering. He argues that the pursuit of social and political equality is a natural extension of the compassion that arises from recognizing existence as fundamentally evil. This perspective leads him to champion socialism and a "free love movement" (freie Liebe) as essential components of a just society. Mainländer envisions a political landscape where communal ownership and collective responsibility replace individualistic pursuits, thereby fostering an environment conducive to the renunciation of the will to life.

Through such a free love movement, sexual and marital relations are redefined outside of their traditional constraints, and thus Mainländer argues that by abolishing marriage and traditional sexual roles, individuals can free themselves from the repressive structures that bind them to procreation and societal expectations. This liberation is crucial for both men and women to gain autonomy over their bodies and lives, allowing and empowering them to pursue the path of contemplation, asceticism, chastity, and ultimately, the renunciation of being through suicide. Mainländer views suicide not as an act of despair but as a rational choice that can alleviate suffering and serve as a profound expression of ethical virtue when approached with a clear understanding of the nature of existence.

In his view, socialism serves as a vehicle for achieving social and economic equality, allowing individuals to transcend the selfish impulses inherent in the will to survive. By eliminating class distinctions and ensuring equal access to education and resources, Mainländer believes that society can cultivate a collective commitment to alleviating suffering. He posits that in a fully realized socialist society, individuals would be liberated from the constraints of individual existence, enabling them to engage in acts of compassionate service to others, thus ensuring that all individuals have the opportunity to confront and alleviate the suffering that arises from existence.

For Mainländer, such a socialist state represents the penultimate step of the will to death's metanarrative, where the satiation of all human desires leads to an understanding of the vanity and emptiness of existence (specifically, that the pleasures this satiation brings does not outweigh the negative value of existence), thus beginning a movement towards the extinction of humanity (and eventually of all matter in the universe).

The politics of Mainländer may have played a profound role in the philosopher's suicide. Letters written to his sister, Minna Batz, imply that there was an indecision on his behalf as to whether suicide would be beneficial, or if he could work as a political leader in the Social Democratic Movement taking place within Germany at the time, in an effort to aid in accelerating society towards the aforementioned "final state." In a letter to his sister, he writes:

If I am not to seek death with pleasure, after this fruit has ripened, lacking any motive, I must enter into the realm of social democracy, which will allow me to become exhausted and dazed, so as not to listen to the seductive voices of this longing for absolute rest, and to achieve redemption forever. [...] Whether I shall prefer the repose of death to all this [active political life], and seal my doctrine with it, I do not know for the moment.

The letters exchanged between them imply that Mainländer was seeking external support in the form of his sister's blessing for his political career, but due to opposing political beliefs, she refused to bestow it. Despite this, Mainländer wrote that he would seek political activism without her blessing, and yet was found dead by hanging within a short period of time, proving that he had gone back on his original decision.

== Reception ==
Self-portrait of Alfred Kubin in Die Philosophie der Erlösung

Nietzsche immediately read Die Philosophie der Erlösung in the year it was published, before any review had appeared. The work contributed to his final separation from Schopenhauer's philosophy. In his own works, Nietzsche gave no attention to Mainländer until a decade later, that is, in the second, expanded edition of The Gay Science, the same book in which he had introduced the phrase "God is dead" in the first edition five years prior: "Could one count such dilettantes and old maids as the sickeningly sentimental apostle of virginity, Mainländer, as a genuine German? After all he was probably a Jew – (all Jews become sentimental when they moralize)." It has been suggested that Mainländer was more than a mere influence, and was instead plagiarized.

Nietzsche also mentions in one of his letters that he met an adherent of Mainländer's philosophy, "a quiet and modest man, a Buddhist [...], passionate vegetarian." (Note: "ein stiller bescheidener Mann, Buddhist, etwas Anhänger Mainländer's, begeisterter Vegetarianer.") The "modest man" told Nietzsche that Mainländer was, in fact, not a Jew.

In the same period, Max Seiling wrote that he believed Mainländer to be one of the few wise heroes to have walked on this earth.

Mainländer's work was not well received by authorities. In Imperial Russia, Mainländer's essay on the esoteric meaning of the Trinity was banned. In the German Reichstag, Die Philosophie der Erlösung was brought up to the rostrum on occasion of the Anti-Socialist Laws. Prominent socialists, however, took interest in his work. The socialist leader August Bebel refers to and uses the arguments of the pessimistic philosopher in his feminist work Woman and Socialism. Bebel mentions Mainländer's sister in his autobiography. Also Eduard Bernstein wrote that he was "very interested" in Mainländer. Ferdinand Domela Nieuwenhuis (1846–1919), the first prominent Dutch socialist, considered Mainländer's work a "great contribution" for socialism.

Alfred Kubin, one of the founders of Der Blaue Reiter, wrote about Die Philosophie der Erlösung, "this work – which expresses my actual thoughts and steels and strengthens me – this philosophy, forms the consolation of my life and death." (Note: "dieses Werk– welches meine eigentlichen Gedanken ausspricht und mich stählt und festigt, – diese Philosophie bildet den Trost meines Lebens und Sterbens")

The Japanese writer Akutagawa wrote in A Note to a Certain Old Friend, "I read Mainländer, whose work has become deeply ingrained in my consciousness." He also refers to Mainländer in his novel Kappa.

Emil Cioran was very impressed by the work of Mainländer.

More recently, a number of contemporary pessimists, like Drew Dalton, have drawn from the work of Mainländer in the hopes of developing new models for ethical and political action.

The communist thinker Slavoj Žižek remarked: "Today, in a society in which the striving for pleasure and happiness fully displays their self-destructive potential, only figures like Mainländer can save us."

== Works ==
In English:

- The Philosophy of Redemption (translation by Christian Romuss; Irukandji Press, 2024)

In German:

- Die Philosophie der Erlösung (Vol. I: 1876; Vol. II: 1886)
- Die letzten Hohenstaufen. Ein dramatisches Gedicht in drei Theilen: Enzo – Manfred – Conradino (1876)
- Meine Soldatengeschichte [My soldier story]. 1925, Georg Stilke.
- Rupertine del Fino, first published in 1899 in the Allgemeine Zeitung of Munich.
- Schriften
  - Band 1 – Die Philosophie der Erlösung. Erster Band, 1876 (Reprint: 1996)
  - Band 2 – Die Philosophie der Erlösung. Zweiter Band. Zwölf philosophische Essays. 1886 (Reprint: 1997)
  - Band 3 – Die letzten Hohenstaufen. Enzo – Manfred – Conradino. 1876 (Reprint: 1998)
  - Band 4 – Die Macht der Motive. Literarischer Nachlaß von 1857 bis 1875. Mit einem Vorwort v. Ulrich Horstmann u. einem Nachwort v. Joachim Hoell u. W.H. Müller-Seyfarth. 1999

In Portuguese:

- A Filosofia da Redenção (translation by Rodrigo Eugênio; self-published, 2026)

In Spanish:

- Filosofía de la redención (translation by Manuel Pérez Cornejo; Ediciones Xorki, 2014)

== See also ==
- Apocatastasis – Restoration to the original or primordial condition
- Buddhist modernism – New movements based on reinterpreted Buddhism
- Death of God theology – Christian theological field of study
- God became the universe – Theological doctrine
- Universal reconciliation – Christian belief that all will be reconciled to God
