= Portrait of Hell =

- DVD cover
- Directed by: Shirō Toyoda
- Screenplay by: Toshio Yasumi
- Based on: Jigokuhen by Ryūnosuke Akutagawa
- Produced by: Tomoyuki Tanaka
- Starring: Kinnosuke Yorozuya; Tatsuya Nakadai
- Cinematography: Kazuo Yamada
- Edited by: Yoshitami Kuroiwa
- Music by: Yasushi Akutagawa
- Production company: Toho
- Distributed by: Toho
- Release date: 20 September 1969 (Japan)
- Running time: 95 minutes
- Country: Japan
- Language: Japanese

Portrait of Hell (Japanese: 地獄変, Hepburn: Jigokuhen), also titled A Story of Hell and The Hell Screen, is a 1969 Japanese jidaigeki film directed by Shirō Toyoda and starring Tatsuya Nakadai and Kinnosuke Nakamura. The film is based on the short story Hell Screen by Ryūnosuke Akutagawa.

== Plot ==
The story, set in the Heian period, depicts the conflict between Korean painter Yoshihide and his Japanese patron, the cruel and egotistical Lord Horikawa.

Horikawa demands that Yoshihide decorate the walls of his new temple with an image of Buddha, but Yoshihide refuses, insisting that he cannot paint what he does not see. In Horikawa's realm, Yoshihide can see nothing but the suffering of peasants. He creates several gruesome images that appear to have some sort of magical power. (For example, a painting of a man killed by Horikawa's soldiers at the beginning of the film gives off the stench of a rotting corpse.) These all appall Horikawa, and he demands that the paintings be destroyed.

Ultimately, Yoshihide asks that he be allowed to portray hell on a screen for the wall of the temple, and Horikawa agrees. Yoshihide asks for one thing to be in the centre of his painting: a burning carriage with Horikawa in it. Horikawa agrees to this, but to provide a model for the scene, he has Yoshihide's daughter Yoshika chained in the carriage. Yoshihide watches in horror as his daughter is burned alive, before going on to paint his masterpiece.

Before the completed screen is unveiled, Yoshihide hangs himself. When Horikawa looks at the screen, he is horrified to see himself portrayed in hell. The climax of the film is slightly vague, but the audience is led to believe that Horikawa becomes trapped in his own private hell through the power of the portrait.

== Cast ==
- Kinnosuke Nakamura as Horikawa
- Tatsuya Nakadai as Yoshihide
- Tappei Shimokawa
- Yoko Naito as Yoshika
- Shun Oide

== Release ==
Portrait of Hell received a roadshow theatrical release in Japan on 20 September 1969 by Toho, and a general release on 27 September 1969. It was first released in the United States with English subtitles on 18 November 1969 and re-issued in April 1972.
