= See What I Wanna See =

- Original cast recording
- Music: Michael John LaChiusa
- Lyrics: Michael John LaChiusa
- Book: Michael John LaChiusa
- Basis: Dragon: the Old Potter's Tale by Ryūnosuke Akutagawa "In a Grove" by Ryūnosuke Akutagawa; Kesa and Morito by Ryūnosuke Akutagawa
- Productions: 2004 Williamstown Theatre Festival; 2005 Off-Broadway; 2006 Ohio; 2007 Boston; 2009 Arlington, Virginia; 2013 New York City; 2015 London

See What I Wanna See is a musical by Michael John LaChiusa based on three short stories by Ryūnosuke Akutagawa: "Kesa and Morito", "In a Grove" (1922, the inspiration for Akira Kurosawa's 1950 film Rashomon) and Dragon: the Old Potter's Tale (1919). The story is told in two parts with two prologues. Each prologue involves the medieval lovers/killers Kesa and Morito. The first act follows a murder in Central Park in 1951 from the various perspectives of several different characters. Act two centers on a priest, wavering in his faith, who creates a hoax about a miracle.

The musical played Off-Broadway in 2005 and has since been performed in the UK and in regional U.S. theatres.

== Production history ==
An early version of the show was mounted at the Williamstown Theater Festival from July 21, 2004, through August 1, 2004. The musical was titled R Shomon then. Directed by Ted Sperling, the cast featured Audra McDonald (Kesa/Wife/Actress), Henry Stram (Janitor/Priest); Michael C. Hall (Morito/Thief/Reporter), Tom Wopat (Husband/CPA), and Mary Testa (Medium, Aunt).

The musical premiered off-Broadway in New York at the Public Theater on October 30, 2005 (October 11 in previews) and ran through December 4, 2005. Directed by Ted Sperling, the cast included Idina Menzel as Kesa/Wife/Actress, Marc Kudisch as Morito/Husband/CPA, Henry Stram as The Janitor/Priest, Aaron Lohr as Thief/Reporter, and Mary Testa as Medium/Aunt. The production received Drama Desk Award nominations for Outstanding Musical, Actor in a Musical (Kudisch), Lead Actress in a Musical (Menzel), Featured Actress in a Musical (Testa), Music and Lyrics (LaChiusa), Orchestrations (Bruce Coughlin), Set Design (Thomas Lynch), and Sound Design (Acme Sound Partners). Menzel also was nominated for the Drama League Award for Distinguished Performance in 2006.

The musical was next staged at Know Theatre of Cincinnati, Ohio, from September 2006 to November 4, 2006. Directed by Artistic Director Jason Bruffy, the cast included Liz Holt, Charlie Clark, Derek Snow, Molly Binder, and Robert Williams. The Music Director on the production was Alan Patrick Kenny, with Lighting Design by Sean Savoie, Scenic Design by Samantha Reno, Sound Design by Doug Borntrager and Costume Design by Liz Holt. This production was also nominated for many awards by both the Cincinnati Acclaim Awards Panel and the Cincinnati Entertainment Awards, winning many. At the Acclaims the production won "Lead Actress in a Musical"(Holt), "Supporting Actress in a Musical"(Binder), "Outstanding Direction" (Bruffy), "Musical Direction" (Kenny), "Lighting Design" (Sean Savoie), "Outstanding Ensemble", and "Outstanding Musical". The production also won "Outstanding Musical" at the Cincinnati Entertainment Awards, beating out Cincinnati Playhouse in the Park's production of Ace.

The New England regional premiere was at Boston's Lyric Stage Company on January 5, 2007, and ran through February 3, 2007, directed by Stephen Terrell with musical direction by Jonathan Goldberg, scenic design by Brynna C. Bloomfield, costume design by Rafael Jaen, lighting design by Karen Perlow, and fight direction by Meron Langsner. This production was nominated for an Elliot Norton Award for Outstanding Production of a Musical.

The musical has also been presented by university groups in the UK and U.S. LaChiusa taught a four-hour master class at Minnesota State University, Mankato, in November 2008 as part of that University's production. The first college to put on the production was Oberlin College in Ohio.

In June 2008, a highly sophisticated and critically acclaimed production opened at the Seoul Opera House complex. This was a very successful version produced by the Korean company Musical Heaven, and directed by the innovative and avant-garde Colombian theater director Javier Gutiérrez R. This same year the play was nominated for numerous Korean musical theater awards, winning some of them. The production was seen by thousands of people in a sold-out run.

In February 2009, the first New York City revival of See What I Wanna See was produced by 5th Floor Productions at the Ida K. Lang Recital Hall at Hunter College in a limited engagement of two performances. It was produced by Michael Sancilio with direction by Corey Chambliss.

The Signature Theatre, Arlington, Virginia, presented the musical from April 7, 2009, through May 31, 2009.

In October 2013, a brand new production of the show opened in New York City at The Producers Club. Directed and Choreographed by Jason Wise, the cast featured Ben Liebert (Janitor/Priest), Brian Bailey (Medium/Aunt Monica), Parker Krug (Morito/Husband/CPA), Nate Suggs (Thief/Reporter), and Colby Levin (Kesa/Wife/Actress). Wise's production used a complex but streamlined draping system to differentiate environments and marked the premiere of a male playing the role of the Medium/Aunt Monica, as well as an actor playing a Trombone (which is not written into the licensed score) on stage.

In 2024, Out of the Box Theatrics produced the show Off-Broadway at Theatre 154, notably cast entirely with actors of Asian/Pacific Islander descent, including Sam Simahk, Marina Kondo, Zachary Noah Piser, and Kelvin Moon Loh. The production received a nomination for the Drama Desk Award for Outstanding Revival of a Musical, along with Piser receiving a nomination for Outstanding Featured Performance in a Musical and Tom Lee for Outstanding Puppet Design.

== Plot synopsis ==
Act 1 – "Kesa" and "R Shomon"

In medieval Japan, Kesa plans to kill her lover, Morito ("Kesa"). Morito arrives, and they make love. Kesa divulges to the audience that "[her] husband knows [their] secret" and draws a knife out of her kimono and raises it to stab Morito at the height of her climax, but a blackout leaves the outcome unknown.

The scene shifts to New York City in 1951, where a murder has taken place. The janitor of a movie house is being interrogated by an unseen policeman. He explains that when he left work in the late night/early morning he took a shortcut through Central Park, where he found "the scarf, the body, the blood" ("The Janitor's Statement"). He slips when he refers to the weapon as "his knife", indicating that the killer is a male, but then he claims that the police had mentioned this to him.

A thief, Jimmy Mako, is also being interrogated ("The Thief's Statement"). He boasts about committing the crime, and a flashback begins as he describes how Lily looked at him on the street after leaving the movies with her husband Louie ("She Looked at Me"). The thief follows the couple to the nightclub where she flirts with both Louie and, discreetly, the Thief ("See What I Wanna See"). The Thief decides that the only way to get a chance at Lily is to get the Husband out of the way. He convinces Louie to go with him to the park to dig up "Big Money" that he knows is hidden there. After a few drinks, Louie agrees, and Lily is also persuaded to come along. The Thief knocks out the husband, ties him up and rapes Lily, who tries vainly to defend herself with a knife ("The Park"). The Thief snaps - he's infatuated with Lily and is convinced that she wants him too, vowing "You'll Go Away With Me". Lily orders the Thief to fight her husband for her ("Murder"). He does, killing Louie; but Lily runs off into the night. Back at the police department, the Thief calmly states that he will "take the chair."

The Janitor explains to his interrogator his philosophy about witnessing strange situations in New York City: "Best Not To Get Involved", but he admits to remembering Lily - "how could you forget a woman like her?" The Wife enters the interrogation room to explain her version of the story ("The Wife's Statement"). After the Thief raped her, she blacked out and awoke to find her husband, Louie, glaring at her, blaming her for the rape, and feeling they no longer had anything left to live for. She begs him for his love and forgiveness ("Louie"). He indicates that they should kill themselves together. She begins to comply ("Louie guide my hand, I will honor you") but at the last second, as he pushes the knife towards her, she panics and turns it towards him, killing him and running away.

Back in the interrogation room, the Janitor recalls an adage that "only the dead tell the truth." A Medium arrives and explains that the spirit of the Husband entered her during a seance. She summons his spirit again ("The Medium and The Husband's Statement"). The Husband's story is that his wife became enraptured with the Thief and turned on the husband ("You'll Go Away With Me" (Reprise)). The rape becomes passionate love-making, and the Husband attempts to block it out of his mind by recalling that the marquee of the movie house screening Rashomon was missing the "a" in the title. The Wife orders the Thief to bind the husband. She assaults her husband verbally, relishing her new-found power, and telling him everything she has kept bottled up during their marriage; she will take "No More". She orders the Thief to stab the Husband. Surprisingly, the Thief instead cuts the bonds of the Husband and holds the knife to the Wife's throat, asking, "Do you want me to slash her throat and save you the trouble later?" Louie just stares, and the Thief eventually releases the Wife, tossing the knife to the Husband. The Husband, seething with rage, chases his wife away and is left alone. He decides that the honorable thing to do would be to kill himself ("Simple as This"). The Medium and the Husband perform an elaborate ritual reminiscent of traditional Japanese Seppuku (stomach-cutting). His last memory is of "someone" removing the stiletto from his abdomen and his blood flowing into the grass.

The Janitor is still in the interrogation room, exhausted. He describes the beauty and the horrors of New York City in 1951 ("Light In the East"). Again he walks home through Central Park that night. He finds the Husband, pulls the knife out of the body and flees the scene. Everyone appears as a collage of voices, telling their statements, sometimes in unison but often interjecting with their own skewed perspectives on the truth.

Act 2 – "Morito" and "Gloryday"

Back in feudal Japan, Morito, Kesa's lover, tells wistfully of their final night together ("Morito"). Morito has planned to murder Kesa just as she has plotted to kill him, but the audience is left in doubt as to who was the successful killer, the scene ends with Morito strangling Kesa as she reaches for her knife. Reality and truth depend on whose perspective one believes. Kesa sees murdering Morito as a way to cleanse herself of her guilt and shame, while Morito believes he is bringing justice to Kesa and renewing his honor.

In New York City in 2002, the meek priest Michael is in confession with his Monsignor. The Priest has lost his faith in the wake of "the tragedy" (alluding to, but not directly referencing the September 11 attacks), having failed to bring comfort to his flock ("Confession/Last Year"). He reminisces about the first time he realized his calling to become a priest, telling his Aunt about it. The Aunt is a spitfire communist and an atheist. She reminds the Priest of all the flaws and wrongdoings in the world and berates him for being "a gullible dope", falling for "The Greatest Practical Joke" of humanity: religion.

The Priest walks through Central Park to clear his mind, where he conceives a great hoax. He decides to stage a false miracle in the park. He posts fliers around the park emblazoned with the message: "In three weeks, on Tuesday, at 1 p.m. sharp, a miracle will occur here in Central Park... from the depths of the pond Christ will appear, believe and be free" ("First Message"). He meets a former C.P.A., a filthy wild man in tattered business attire. The C.P.A. becomes inspired by the Priest's message ("Central Park"). He tells of his former life as an adultering, lying, disgustingly wealthy accountant. Worried that God "doesn't see [his] life", he goes to the park, where he discovers his true calling, "to live free and wild". Yet, he remains desperate for a life with purpose, where God sees him as special and unique.

The Priest meets an Actress named Deanna as he posts new fliers in the park ("Second Message"). She is jittery, jumping from one subject to the next. She seduces the Priest, and the two have sex behind a bush in the park. Visibly distraught, she explains that she is struggling with cocaine addiction. She had found success in a coffee commercial, which she calls "residual heaven" ("Coffee"). To celebrate her success, her soap opera-actor boyfriend and she binge on cocaine and vodka and go for a drive in their Jaguar through Beverly Hills. The car flies off a cliff, and the actress breaks her neck, legs, nose and arms: "ouch right?". Her wrecked face draws bad press, and her coffee commercial is withdrawn. She consoles herself with morphine and barbiturates. She tells the Priest that she hopes the miracle occurs, because she could use some hope in her life.

The Priest visits his Aunt Monica again and discovers she is dying. The TV news program she is watching shows the hordes of people gathering in Central Park for the "Gloryday". The Priest goes to the park to see what he has created. He enters a bar across the street from the park where he meets Aaron, the Reporter on the news program. The Reporter mentions that he has met the Priest before, on the day of "the tragedy". He was running away from the disaster, while the Priest was running toward it. The Reporter says that he, like the Priest, is looking for answers ("Curiosity"). The other characters appear, lighting candles and praying as the Priest emotionlessly "admires [his] handicraft" ("Prayer").

With one hour left until the miracle the Priest giddily points out souvenir salesmen, religious groups and celebrities ("Third Prayer/Feed the Lions"). He is grabbed by The CPA who says that he knows The Priest's secret...he is an angel. Deanna finds the Priest and thanks him for giving her hope. Finally, the Priest sees his Aunt, who, despite being in great pain, has made her way to the park. She confesses that she has lied all these years: she knows that there is a God, and she knows that "There Will Be a Miracle". She falls asleep on a park bench, telling her nephew to wake her when the Gloryday arrives. With a few minutes left, the crowd joins in "Prayer" for forgiveness, and the Priest has a change of heart. He runs around screaming that it was a joke and that everyone should go home. Now Deanna, the CPA, the Reporter and Aunt Monica describe the scene: The sky goes black, a harsh wind picks up, lightning flashes, mist hangs in the air, the earth trembles, and a tornado hits the lake. Everyone flees, pulling coats over their heads to protect themselves from the dust and debris. The Priest tries to stop them, but he is left standing alone. Looking back, he sees something "Rising Up" from the pond, and he sobs as he sees the Glory. In rapture, he races around, but no one else has seen it. The Reporter, the C.P.A. and Deanna are angry. He wakes Aunt Monica and tells her about it, asking if she believes him. She replies, "If you say so baby, why not?"

Back in the confessional, the Priest tells his Monsignor that he put the collar back on a month later at Aunt Monica's funeral, but he is still confused about his faith. He created a lie for the masses that became a truth for only himself, and he doesn't know what to do. Everyone repeats "the truth" as church bells chime.

== Musical numbers ==
Act 1

- "Kesa" – Kesa
- "The Janitor's Statement" – The Janitor
- ""The Thief's Statement/She Looked at Me" – The Thief
- "See What I Wanna See" – The Wife
- "Big Money" – The Thief, The Husband
- "The Park" – The Thief, The Wife
- "You'll Go Away With Me" – The Thief
- "Murder" – The Thief
- "Best Not to Get Involved" – The Janitor
- "The Wife's Statement" – The Wife
- "Louie" – The Wife
- "The Medium and the Husband's Statement" – The Janitor, The Medium, The Husband
- "Quartet: You'll Go Away With Me (Reprise)" – The Husband, The Wife, The Thief, The Medium
- "No More" – The Wife, The Thief, The Husband
- "Simple As This" – The Husband, The Medium
- "Light in the East/Finale Act 1" – Company

Act 2

- "Morito" – Morito
- "Confession/Last Year" – Priest, Aunt Monica
- "The Greatest Practical Joke" – Aunt Monica
- "First Message" – Priest, Actress, Reporter, CPA
- "Central Park" – CPA
- "Second Message" – Priest, Actress
- "Coffee" – Actress
- "Gloryday" – Company
- "Curiosity/Prayer" – Reporter, Actress, CPA, Priest
- "Third Prayer/Feed the Lions" – Priest, CPA, Actress
- "There Will Be a Miracle" – Aunt Monica
- "Prayer (Reprise)" – Priest, Actress, CPA, Reporter
- "Rising Up/Finale Act 2" – All

== Recording ==
The Original Cast recording was released on March 7, 2006, by Ghostlight Records.
