= Kappa (novella) =

Novel by Ryūnosuke Akutagawa

- Book cover for Kappa (1949 edition)
- Author: Ryūnosuke Akutagawa
- Original title: Kappa (河童)
- Language: Japanese
- Genre: Novella
- Publication date: 1927
- Publication place: Japan
- Media type: Print

Kappa (Japanese: 河童, Hepburn: Kappa) is a 1927 novella written by the Japanese author Ryūnosuke Akutagawa.

The story is narrated by a psychiatric patient who claims to have travelled to the land of the kappa, a creature from Japanese folklore. Critical opinion has often been divided between those who regard it as a biting satire of Taishō Japan and those who see it as an expression of Akutagawa's private agony.

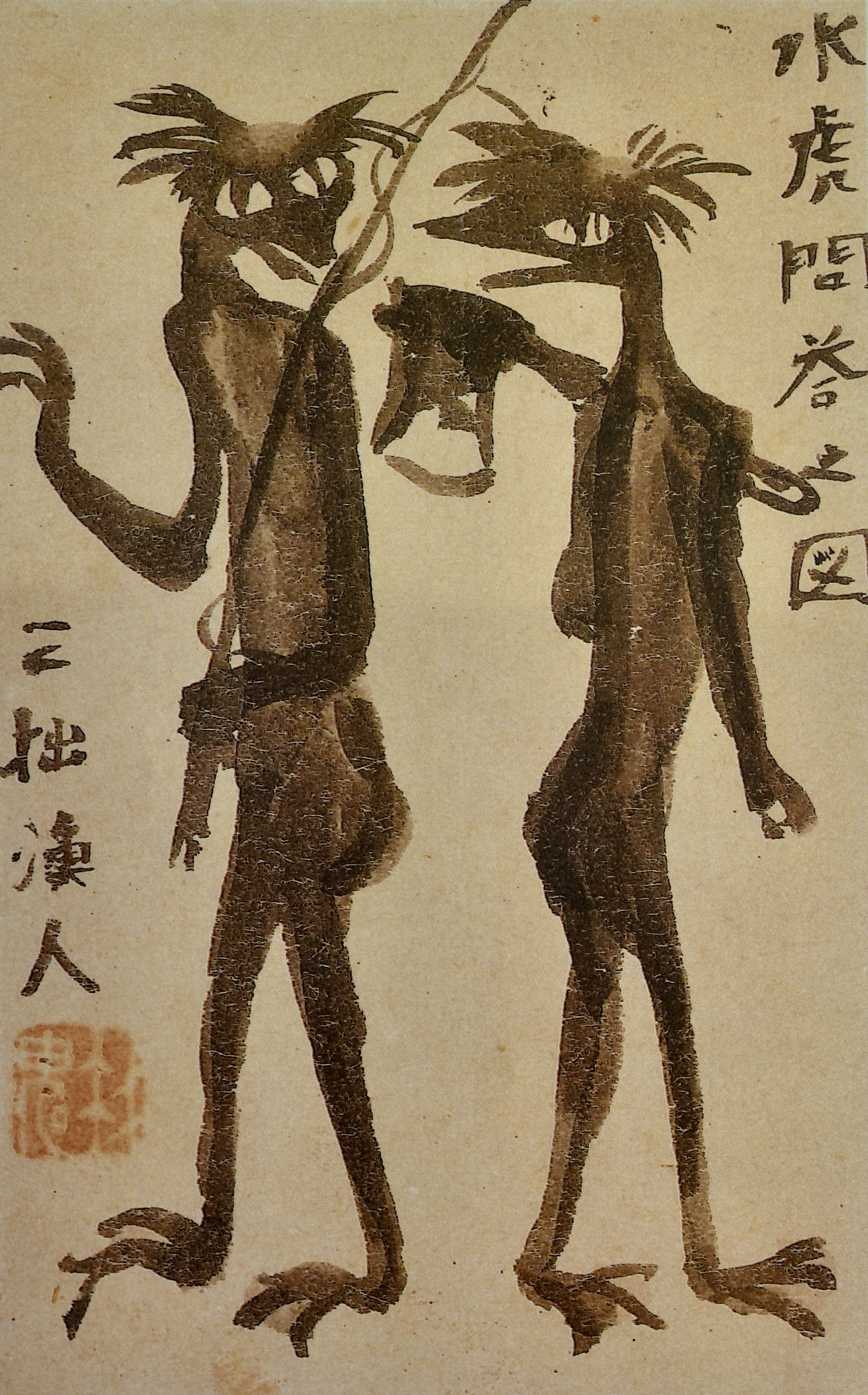
Kappa as drawn by Akutagawa himself. From "Suiko Mondō-no-Zu" (1920).

== Synopsis ==
A psychiatric patient, who is known only as "Number 23", tells the story of a time he visited the land of the kappa. He had lost his way in the mountains of Hotakadake and was surrounded by a group of the strange creatures, who then showed him around their home. They explain to him the kappas' religion, called Lifeism, whose god, the Tree of Life, teaches them to 'live avidly'.

He found that the world of the kappa often appeared to be the opposite of how things were in the human world. For instance, fetuses are asked by their fathers whether or not they want to be born. One replied, "I do not wish to be born. In the first place, it makes me shudder to think of all the things I shall inherit from my father—the insanity alone is bad enough."

The psychiatric patient relates how he met with kappas of many occupations. One of them, Geeru, told him that unemployed laborers are gassed and then eaten by the other kappa. Patient 23 also encountered Maggu, a philosopher writing a collection of aphorisms titled The Words of a Fool, which included the line "a fool always considers others fools". He met another kappa called Tokku, a sceptical poet who had committed suicide and appeared to Patient 23 as a ghost by means of necromancy. Tokku, while concerned about being famous after his death, admires writers and philosophers who have killed themselves, such as Heinrich von Kleist, Philipp Mainländer and Otto Weininger. He esteems Michel de Montaigne who justified voluntary death, but dislikes Arthur Schopenhauer because he was a pessimist who did not commit suicide. On his return to the real world, Patient 23 muses that the kappas were clean and superior to human society and becomes a misanthrope.

== Reception ==
When it was first published, many Japanese reviewers saw it as an unsophisticated social satire that lacked insight. Since then, critics in Japan have often been divided between those who regard it as a satire of Taishō Japan, and those who see it as an expression of Akutagawa's personal agony. When the first English translation appeared in 1947, a review in Time magazine declared that, to "American readers, Ryunosuke Akutagawa's satire seemed almost too good to have been written by a Japanese." Yoshida Seiichi, drawing on Akutagawa's letters, argued that Kappa was not a social satire, but rather reflected Akutagawa's personal worldview. Susan J. Napier has called Kappa "Japan's first full-blown dystopian novel". Tsuruta Kinya, writing in the 1970s, said that the work is "obviously a mixed-bag of public themes and private fantasies" allowing for many different interpretations.

Jonathan Swift's Gulliver's Travels as well as Samuel Butler's Erehwon have both been suggested as influences on Akutagawa. Nikolai Gogol's Diary of a Madman and Lu Xun's work of the same name have also both been cited as precedents, as they both feature insane narrators, as has Enzō Matsunaga's Dream-Eaters, which takes place in a psychiatric hospital.

Tokku, the suicidal poet kappa, has often been seen as a self-portrait of Akutagawa, who took his own life the same year that Kappa was published. The anniversary of his death is sometimes known as "Kappaki" (河童忌) in honour of this novel.

== Translations ==
Kappa has had a number of translations into English. The first was by Shiojiri Seiichi in 1947, who subtitled his translation "Gulliver in A Kimono". In 1967, Kojima Takashi and John McVittie included a new translation in their collection Exotic Japanese Stories: the Beautiful and the Grotesque. Geoffrey Bownas, a Japanese studies scholar, produced a third translation in 1970. A fourth translation by Lisa Hofmann-Kuroda and Allison Markin Powell was published by New Directions in 2023. The tale was also translated into Czech by Vlasta Hilska in 1960 and into French by Arimasa Mori in 1965.

== See also ==
- Cynicism (philosophy)
- Gulliver's Travels
