= Autumn Mountain =

Ryūnosuke Akutagua Story

- Short story by Ryūnosuke Akutagawa
- Original title: 秋山図 (Shūzanzu)
- Translator: Ivan Morris

Publication
- Publication date: 1921

Autumn Mountain (秋山図, Shūzanzu) is a 1921 short story by Japanese writer Ryūnosuke Akutagawa. Akutagawa first published the story when he was 29. The story tells the tale of a painting, supposed to be the greatest ever made. However, when the speaker sees the painting, it does not meet the expectations of the promised masterpiece of unparalleled beauty. However, even though the speaker does not know if the painting actually exists, he realizes that he can see the beauty in his mind. In the short story, Akutagawa deals with the subjects of truth and beauty.

== Plot summary ==
While visiting his friend Yün Nan-t'ien, Wang Shih-ku tells a story about a masterful painting called Autumn Mountain by the artist Ta Ch'ih. He explains that a man named Yen-k'o, a great admirer of Ta Ch'ih, learned of the painting, which was supposed to be the finest of the artist's works. Seeking the painting, Yen-k'o ends up at the house of a Mr. Chang, who shows him the painting. Yen-k'o stands in awe of the painting, declaring it of "godlike quality". Convinced he has witnessed perfect beauty, he attempts to purchase the painting a number of times over many years, but Mr. Chang refuses to sell it.

Fifty years later, Wang Shih-ku himself, after hearing of it from Yen-k'o, attempts to see the painting. He learns that Mr. Wang has obtained the painting from Mr. Chang's grandson. Wang Shih-ku goes to see the painting; he is, however, disappointed when it is hung. The painting, while a masterpiece, does not live up to the description Yen'ko had given. He and Yen-k'o show their disappointment, though the renowned critic Lien-chou lauds it as one of the greatest paintings ever produced.

After Wang Shih-ku finishes the story, he and Yün Nan-t'ien muse over whether the painting had another version, or if the masterpiece Yen-k'o saw never existed outside of his head. Wang Shih-ku announces, that even if it never existed, he can still see it in his head, so there is no loss. The two men clap and laugh after realizing this.

== Characters in Autumn Mountain ==
- Wang Shih-ku – The narrator of the tale, he once saw Autumn Mountain, but realized it did not live up to the description of his friend Yen-k'o. He realizes that the amazing painting exists in his head, even if it does not reside in the real world.
- Yün Nan-t'ien – The friend of Wang Shih-ku who invites him to tea to tell the story.
- Yüan Tsai – Master who first informs Yen-k'o of Autumn Mountain and tells him where to find it.
- Yen-k'o – Art collector who greatly admirers the master Ta Ch'ih. He seeks out Autumn Mountain, and, upon seeing it, does everything in his power to purchase it. After passing on the absolute perfection he finds in the painting to Wang Shih-ku, he sees the painting a final time, only to not find the same mastery.
- Mr. Chang – The original owner of Autumn Mountain, he seems uneasy about the painting, not sure if its beauty lies only in his own mind, or if others can see it as well. He maintains a run-down yet grand residence where the painting is kept.
- Mr. Chang's grandson – The inheritor of Mr. Chang's estate who gives the painting to Mr. Wang's death upon obtaining it.
- Mr. Wang - The man who obtains the painting from Mr. Chang's grandson. The painting is the pride of his collection, and invites critics to come and see it. After witnessing Wang Shih-ku's and Yen-k'o's negative reactions, he tries to see if there is another, grander copy of the painting.
- Lien-chou – A renowned art critic who declares Autumn Mountain a great masterpiece.

== Themes ==
Like many of his works, Autumn Mountain deals with the objectivity of truth. The two friends do not know if the masterpiece ever really existed, but do realize that such a painting exists at least in the reality of their minds. Though the painting appears to be nothing more than a figment of imagination. However, Akutagawa comments on the nature of supreme beauty by asserting that ultimate beauty did exist, even if only in the observer's mind.
