= The Nose (Akutagawa short story) =

Short story by Ryūnosuke Akutagawa

- Short story by Ryūnosuke Akutagawa
- Original title: 鼻 (Hana)
- Translator: Ivan Morris, Jay Rubin
- Country: Japan
- Language: Japanese

Publication
- Publisher: Shinshichō
- Media type: Print (Periodical and Paperback)
- Publication date: January 1916

The Nose (鼻, Hana) is a satirical short story by Ryūnosuke Akutagawa based on a thirteenth-century Japanese tale from the Uji Shūi Monogatari. "The Nose" was Akutagawa's second short story, written not long after "Rashōmon". It was first published in January 1916 in the Tokyo Imperial University student magazine Shinshichō and later published in other magazines and various Akutagawa anthologies. The story is mainly a commentary on vanity and religion, in a style and theme typical to Akutagawa's work.

== Translation ==
Multiple translators have published "The Nose" in English, the most recent by Jay Rubin and published by Penguin Group.

== Plot summary ==
Zenchi Naigu, a Heian period Buddhist priest, is more concerned with diminishing his overly long, dangling nose than he is with studying and teaching the sūtras. He pretends to ignore his nose in fear it will be mentioned, and studies religious texts in a desperate attempt to find a person with a nose like his. When in private, he constantly checks his nose in a mirror, hoping for even the smallest amount of shrinkage.

One autumn, a disciple reveals he has learned a new technique to shrink noses from a friend, a Chinese doctor who has become a high-ranking priest at the Chōrakuji temple in Kyoto. At first, Naigu feigns disinterest, to appeal to the misconception that he is unconcerned with his nose, but eventually “gives in” to his disciple's insisting. The disciple first boils the nose, then stomps on it, finally removing the beads of fat the treatment extracts from the nose. To Naigu's satisfaction, the nose, once dangling past his chin, is now the size of a typical hooked nose.

Naigu, excited but nervous, sets about his weekly routines. He is surprised, however, to find the people he encounters laughing at him far more openly than they had before. Naigu becomes bitter and harsh, to the point where one disciple proclaims: “Naigu will be punished for treating us so harshly instead of teaching us Buddha’s Law”. People continue to laugh at Naigu for his vanity, until one day, Naigu wakes up, and to his relief and rejoicing, his nose has returned to its original length.

== Characters ==
Naigu
A Buddhist priest ascribed the “wisdom of zen”, his life is consumed with an obsession over his nose, which dangles past his mouth at about five or six inches. He looks through the scriptures to find reference of others with his peculiar predicament, but achieves no success. When he finds a method to shorten his nose, he becomes flippant when people laugh at his vanity. Eventually, when his nose grows back, he rejoices in his condition.
Disciple
A follower of Naigu who informs his master of a method to shorten his nose. He later joins the others in his criticism of Naigu, upset that Naigu is more interested in his vanity than in teaching the scriptures.

== Major themes ==
Akutagawa explores the themes of vanity and egotism in "The Nose". Naigu's vanity leads him to obsess only with his nose. This vanity eventually breeds disfigurement and a coldness from his peers, recognizing Naigu's egotism taking precedence over his religious studies and teaching. Instead of his status as a renowned priest, Naigu views his nose as the source of how society will judge him. As is typical with Akutagawa, these inherently modern psychological themes are directly injected into ancient stories and myth.

== Literary significance and reception ==
Akutagawa gained much of his initial fame from "The Nose", one of his earliest works.

After reading "The Nose", the renowned writer Natsume Sōseki sent a letter to Akutagawa, praising his work:

I found your piece ["The Nose"] very interesting. Sober and serious without trying to be funny. It exudes humor, a sure sign of refined taste. Furthermore, the material is fresh and eye-catching. Your style is well-published, admirably fitting.

The story was praised by Arkady Strugatsky who translated it into Russian in 1971.

=== References to other works ===
The story makes numerous references to the Buddhist scriptures, mentioning many characters from them, such as Mokuren, Sharihotsu, Ryūju, Memyō, and the Bodhisattvas. It also makes reference to a Chinese story where the Chinese Shu Han emperor Liu Bei is said to have had long ears.

== References to actual geography ==
The story makes reference to Chōraku-ji Temple, a Buddhist temple in Shimoda, Shizuoka where the story's Chinese doctor formerly became a high-ranking priest.

"The Nose" also makes reference to the Kyoto Imperial Palace, where Naigu is one of the few honored priests able to minister within the palace walls.
