= Critique of the Doctrines of Kant and Schopenhauer =

Critical essay by Philipp Mainländer

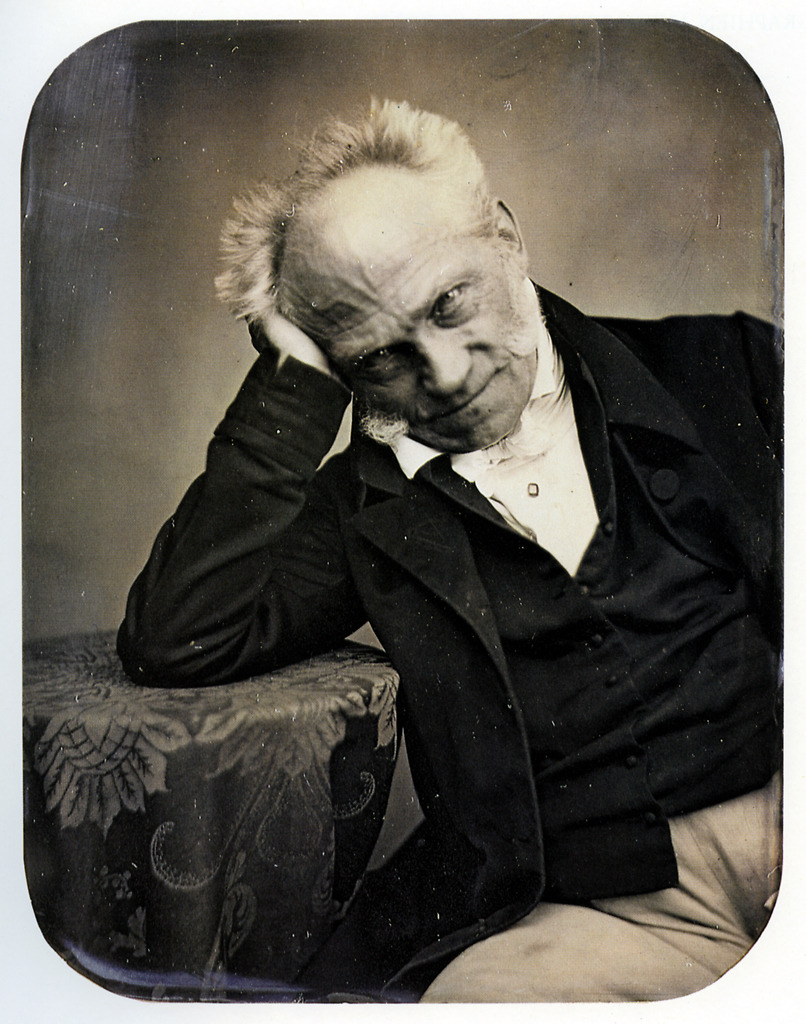
Schopenhauer in 1852, 64 years old

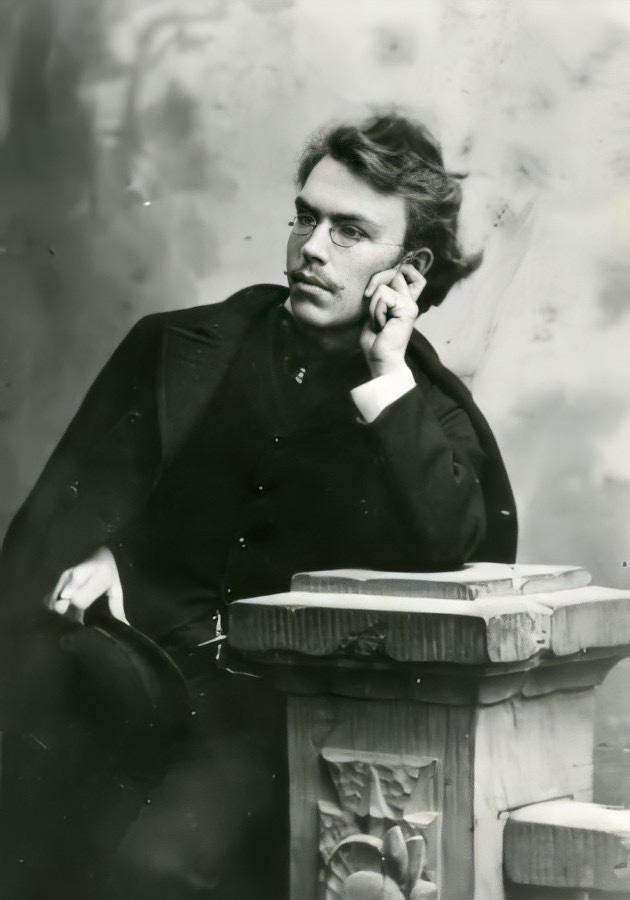
Mainländer in 1876, 34 years old

"Critique of the Doctrines of Kant and Schopenhauer" (Kritik der Lehren Kant's und Schopenhauer's) is the title of the long appendix to Philipp Mainländer's Die Philosophie der Erlösung (The Philosophy of Redemption). In this appendix, Mainländer offers a criticism of the philosophy of Arthur Schopenhauer. Mainländer saw the purification of Schopenhauer's philosophy as the primary task of his life. The criticism was influential in Nietzsche's philosophical development.

== General overview ==
"Critique of the Doctrines of Kant and Schopenhauer" is generally seen as offering a position closer to realism than the idealism of Kant and Schopenhauer. Mainländer aims to free the philosophy of Schopenhauer from its metaphysical tendencies.

It is the longest criticism of Schopenhauer's work, and it earned him the praise of Frauenstädt, "apostle primarie" of Schopenhauer, Max Seiling and Frederick C. Beiser for being one of the most talented followers of Schopenhauer.

== Epistemology ==
=== Background of the critical philosophy ===
Locke had referred all philosophical research to the domain of experience. He argued that the mind is empty at birth, and that all knowledge stems from experience. This was an important step in philosophy; however, accepting it gives rise to significant problems. The most famous challenge came from Hume, namely, if all knowledge is derived from experience we have no right to claim things are caused, we can only perceive that they follow after each other. Berkeley also noted that all that is given to us are subjective sensations, and Thomas Reid expounded this further by demonstrating that the mere sensations of the senses bear no resemblance to objective qualities, such as extension, figure, and number.

Kant determined that although Locke was right to assert that all knowledge begins with experience, it does not follow that all knowledge arises from experience. Cognition has a priori structures (the categories and the form of intuition) that structure experience, that is, are constitutive of experience as ordered and intelligible. (Kant notes that without the categories experience would be less than a great roar of sound). These forms that lie in us are causality (amongst other categories), space and time.

G.E. Schulze had argued that Kant's proof that causality must be an inborn concept is invalid. Schopenhauer and Mainländer agreed with Schulze's criticism of Kant's argument for the a priori status of causality.

=== Causality ===
It was therefore up to those who were loyal to Kant’s project to secure the validity of causality. As Hume’s skepticism is based on the assumption that causality is a concept drawn from successive external representations, Schopenhauer started to investigate how we actually come to know external representations. After all, all that is given to me are subjective sensations, sense data that go not beyond my skin. So how is it possible to perceive something beyond my skin, outside of me? Mainländer praises this as an exceptional sign of prudence.

The senses merely deliver the data, which is processed by the brain into the objective world by means of the understanding, which conceives every change in a sense organ as the effect of an external cause, and seeks the cause in space. Hereby, for the first time it is shown how the visible world arises from sense data. Schopenhauer called this comprehension of a change in the sense organ having a cause in space, the causal law (German: Kausalitätsgesetz).

Schopenhauer deemed that he had thereby disproven Hume’s skepticism, since representations presuppose the causal law. Causality is consequently not a concept drawn from successive representations, but representations presuppose knowledge of causality.

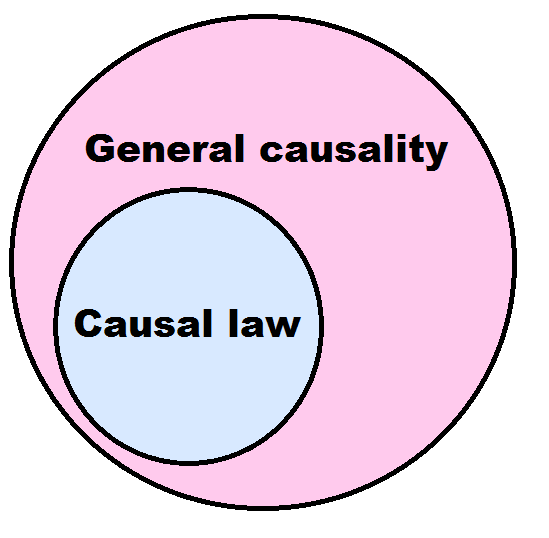
The causal law does not cover causality in general.

This reasoning is too hastily made (a subreption). Schopenhauer has indeed shown that the causal law is needed for objective perception and consequently lies a priori in us, but not that causality in general must lie a priori in us. The causal law merely says: every change in my sense organ is the effect of a cause. It is a one-sided relation (the outer world affects me) of the subject that says nothing about objects affecting each other. The causal law does not cover causality in general.

In order to do anything else than searching the cause of an effect, we need another mental faculty. Reason reflects and recognizes that I am not a privileged subject but an object amongst objects, so with help of experience it subjects all appearances to the general law: wherever in nature a change takes place, it is the effect of a cause, which preceded it in time. Causality is therefore given a posteriori and not a priori, though it has an aprioristic ground.

=== Transcendental Analytic ===
According to Schopenhauer the only mental faculty needed for the creation of the outer world is the understanding. The reason merely draws concepts from the objective world, reflects on it, but in no way helps to construct it. Kant however, maintained that there are inborn concepts, categories, and that they are needed to make from “the chaos of appearances”, the manifold given in perception, an objectively valid connection called nature.

Schopenhauer has shown that only due to the understanding we can know external objects, by moving the sensation in the sense organ outwards. This is its only function. So the understanding gives us many external representations, though it does not know how they are connected amongst each other. Mainländer argued that Schopenhauer was unjustified in treating causality in general as a function of the understanding. Consequently, his explanation that the understanding can know that different partial-representations come from one object does not hold. For example, if I stand before a lamppost and first behold its lower part, and then move my eyes to its top; then my understanding has first moved the sensation in my eye outwards to see its lower part, and has, after that, done the same with the top; but it does not deduce that the sensations come from one object, since its only function is moving the sensation outwards. It has merely given me partial-representations.

This observation forms, in the Critique of Pure Reason, the heart of the Transcendental Analytic. Kant writes:

It was assumed, that the senses deliver not only impressions, but also conjoin them and provide images of objects. But for this to happen something else, besides the receptivity of impressions, is needed, namely a function for the synthesis of these impressions.

Since every appearance contains a manifold, and different perceptions are found in the mind scattered and singly, a conjoinment of them is needed, which they cannot have in the senses themselves.

For the unity of a manifold to become an objective perception (like something in the representation of space,) first the accession of the manifold and then the unification of this manifold are necessary, an act which I call the synthesis of apprehension.

The combination (conjunctio) of a manifold can never come to us through the senses.

Kant's Transcendental Atlantic examines the synthesis of representations, including the role of mental faculties in combining sensory impressions into unified experience.

And holding onto this important observation, it makes clear that the categories are a secondary issue in the Analytic. The categories are necessary as fixed rules for the subject in its conjoinment of partial-representations: otherwise the subject would arbitrarily conjoin whatever appears, and no sustained object could be perceived.

In other words, Kant needed the categories because there is (according to his teaching) no coercion coming from the reality-in-itself to perceive this or that object, to conjoin the lower and upper part of the lamppost into one object. So the coercion to see sustained objects (and a world with natural laws) comes according to Kant solely from the subject. This "absurd" reasoning of Kant's is not needed when we comprehend the activity which brings forth homogenous partial-representations as coming from the same thing-in-itself. The activity of a tree-in-itself would, when we behold its lower part, provide us the sensation that leads to the partial-representation of its lower part, and when we behold the upper part the corresponding partial-representation. Judgement-power can determine that the activity originates from one unity (the tree-in-itself) and reason conjoins them. This way, the coercion stems from reality-in-itself instead of the subject.

=== Space and time ===
Kant had argued that space and time lie as infinite magnitudes inborn in us, and are forms of our sensibility. Schopenhauer accepted this characterization of space and time, as did many neo-Kantians: it was frequently praised as one of the greatest events in philosophy. The theory of relativity eroded the value of the Aesthetic, as it proved to be incompatible with relativity, famously causing neo-Kantians to write A Hundred Authors against Einstein.

A few critical followers of Kant were skeptical from the beginning, Afrikan Spir and Mainländer noted, independently from each other, that the Aesthetic is self-contradicting, and Mainländer maintains that Kant was conscious of this, as Kant redefines the nature of space and time in the Analytic.

In the Analytic Kant makes a distinction between form of perception (German: Anschauung) and pure perception. Time and mathematical space are no longer forms of perception, but are the synthesis of a manifold which sensibility offers in its original receptivity. Kant is silent about what this manifold of the original receptivity of sensibility is. The investigation of Mainländer gives as result that these inborn forms are, instead, point-space and the present (point-time). Time and mathematical spaces are subjective creations a posteriori.

Mainländer saw it as the greatest merit of Kant to show that space and time are subjective. However, space and time do not readily lie in us, to bring forth properties such as extension and motion, but are subjective preconditions to cognize them.

Extension does not depend upon space. Because Kant and Schopenhauer automatically assumed that extension and space are equivalent concepts, by showing that space exists only for a perceiver, they had to deny that extension exists independently from a perceiver. Mainländer thus distinguished between proper length and length as it is perceived.

Here, Mainländer not only circumvented the contradiction with relativity of Kant-Schopenhauer, but also came to a result that surprisingly complies with special relativity, which teaches us that length as it is perceived is subjective: it is dependent on the velocity of the observer and the proper length of the object that is perceived.

$$L=L_{0}\sqrt{1-v^{2}/c^{2}}$$

where

L_{0} is the proper length,
L is the length observed by an observer in relative motion with respect to the object,
v is the relative velocity between the observer and the moving object,
c is the speed of light.

The separation of space as it is observed and proper length seemed to have no meaning before the discovery of relativity: in a time with only Newtonian mechanics it seemed to many as a superfluous distinction. As a consequence, not realizing why this would be of any importance, contemporaries of Mainländer accused his philosophy of simply being realism contrary to his own claims. (Plümacher, Von Hartmann)

Time is likewise subjective though nothing without its real underlay. It is its “subjective measuring rod.”

== Ontology ==
According to Mainländer, Schopenhauer found the only path that leads to the thing-in-itself.

If we refer the concept of force to that of will, we have in fact referred the less known to what is infinitely better known; indeed, to the one thing that is really immediately and fully known to us, and have very greatly extended our knowledge. If, on the contrary, we subsume the concept of will under that of force, as has hitherto always been done, we renounce the only immediate knowledge which we have of the inner nature of the world, for we allow it to disappear in a concept which is abstracted from the phenomenal, and with which we can therefore never go beyond the phenomenal.

Yet, though we know the will without the forms of space and causality, under the influence of Kant's transcendental aesthetic, Schopenhauer deems that we know the will under the form of our inner sensibility, time, which implies that we know not the will as it is in itself. This would mean that we can never determine anything about the essence of the world, and Schopenhauer uses this result to continue with obscure metaphysics. Mainländer maintains that, since time is not a form of our inner sensibility, we can know the thing-in-itself completely and nakedly.

== Aesthetics ==
Although Mainländer considers Schopenhauer's works on art to be brilliant and spirited, they are often based on pure metaphysics. Schopenhauer reintroduces Plato's theory of forms and calls Platonic Ideas the first and most universal form of objects without the subordinate forms of the phenomenon. Mainländer comments that this is a meaningless combination of words.

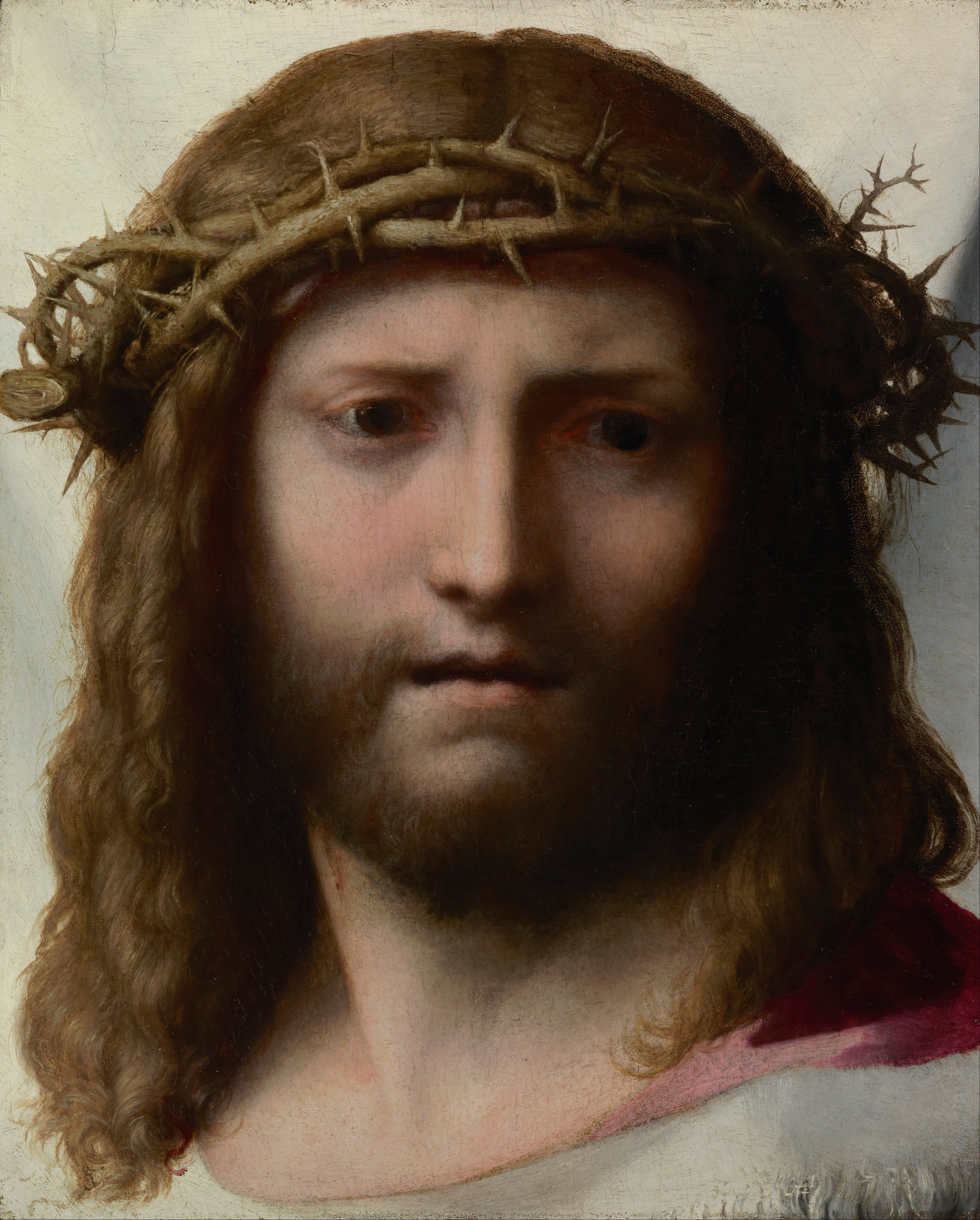
Head of Christ by Antonio da Correggio

Kant and Schopenhauer briefly discuss the sublime character, but only mention characteristics that explain not its essence. Just like how the feeling of the sublime stems from overcoming the fear of death in a situation where the individual normally would feel endangered, though it is merely self-deception, sublimity inheres the individual if it permanently has contempt of death.

Mainländer mentions three classes of sublime characters. To the first class belong those who still love life, but care no longer about their individual weal as they fight for a higher ideal (the freedom of a nation, social rights, emancipation), in a word, heroes. To the second class belong those who are convinced of the worthlessness of life, and this conviction has made them immune to all worldly affairs. Saints and wise philosophers such as Spinoza belong to this class. The third class belongs to those who are sublime in the highest degree: the ascetic human who returns to the world, without making any concession, only to free the world from suffering. That they gain thereby adulation during life and deification after death leaves them cold and indifferent. Buddha and Christ fill up this class.

Mainländer highlights two exceptional works of art for their portrayal of the sublime appearance of the wise hero: are Eschenbach’s Parzival and Corregio’s Head of Christ.

== Ethics ==
Schopenhauer called Kant's distinction between the empirical and intelligible character "one of the most beautiful and most profound thought products of this great mind". It claims that although all appearances act in a determined manner, it is the subject who issued these laws of nature: they owe their existence and necessity to the subject. Therefore, as thing-in-itself, we must be free, though it is a transcendental freedom which we cannot comprehend. Mainländer argues that this distinction follows only because of errors in epistemology, since Kant and Schopenhauer believed that all coercion stems from the subject, instead of the things-in-themselves.

Schopenhauer used this transcendental freedom to legitimize the negation of motives, quietives, which finds its expression in asceticism. Hereby Schopenhauer shows that compassion is not the basis of morality, since saintliness is not motivated by compassion. A saint who is worried about his immortal soul and flees to deserts, is indeed no longer sensitive to worldly motives, but only because a stronger motive crushes them.

== Metaphysics ==
As every aspect of Schopenhauer's metaphysics has been discussed throughout the critique, Mainländer ends instead with a selection of religious texts, that show that the essence of Schopenhauer’s philosophy, Christianity and Buddhism is one: the absolute truth.
