= Hell Screen =

Short story by Ryūnosuke Akutagawa

- Author: Ryūnosuke Akutagawa
- Original title: 地獄変 (Jigokuhen)
- Translator: Jay Rubin, Seiji M. Lippit, W.H.H. Norman, and others
- Language: Japanese
- Genre: Short story
- Publisher: Iwanami Shoten Publishing
- Publication date: 1918
- Publication place: Japan
- English publication date: 1948 (originally)

Hell Screen (地獄変, Jigokuhen) is a short story written by Japanese writer Ryūnosuke Akutagawa. It was a reworking of Uji Shūi Monogatari and originally published in 1918 as a serialization in two newspapers. It was later published in a collection of Akutagawa short stories, Akutagawa Ryūnosuke zenshū.

== Translation ==
"Hell Screen" was first translated into English by W.H.H. Norman in 1948, in his collection of Akutagawa short stories Hell Screen and Other Stories. Numerous variant translations have followed, including the most recent one translated by Jay Rubin and published by Penguin Group.

== Plot overview ==
"Hell Screen" is narrated by a mostly uninvolved servant who witnesses or hears of the events. The plot of "Hell Screen" centers on the artist Yoshihide. Yoshihide is considered “the greatest painter in the land”, and is often commissioned to create works for the Lord of Horikawa, who also employs Yoshihide's daughter in his mansion, and is rumoured to be taking her as his mistress. When Yoshihide is instructed to create a folding screen depicting the Buddhist hell, he proceeds to inflict tortures upon his apprentices, so he can see what he is trying to paint. Supernatural forces seem to be present; one time, Yoshihide speaks in a devilish voice. Throughout the story Yoshihide seeks to get his daughter back from his employer, but is refused. One night the servant is dragged by a monkey into a room where he finds the daughter recovering from what appears to be an attempted rape. The monkey thanks him for saving her with a servile gesture. She refuses to name her abuser. The story climaxes when Yoshihide asks the lord to burn a beautiful lady in a carriage so he can finish the screen, as he claims he can only paint what he has seen. The lord concedes, but, in a macabre twist, Yoshihide must watch as his daughter and her monkey who rushes to be with her are the ones who burn. The story ends with the magnificently horrible screen completed, and Yoshihide's suicide by hanging.

== Themes ==
The work follows one of Akutagawa's major styles: the updating of ancient tales to reflect modern psychology. One major psychological theme is artistic obsession, as Makoto Ueda puts it: “For Akutagawa the dilemma was insoluble: if the artist chooses to place his art ahead of his life, in the end he must suffer the destruction of his life”. The story is also an examination of Akutagawa's own devotion to his work. Another theme is the objectivity of truth, as the narrator, a servant of the Lord of Horikawa, repeatedly ignores the physical attraction the Lord has for Yoshihide's daughter, despite overwhelming evidence. The servant even refuses to believe his own eyes when he witnesses the Lord forcing himself on Yoshihide's daughter. At the story's end, the servant proclaims:

Word soon spread that His Lordship had burned the carriage that night in the Palace of the Melting Snows, and there seem to have been many who were highly critical of the event. First of all came the question of Yoshihide’s daughter: why had his Lordship chosen to burn her alive? The rumor most often heard was that he had done it out of spite for her rejection of his love. I am certain, however, that he did it to punish the twisted personality of an artist who would go so far as to burn a carriage and kill a human being to complete the painting of a screen. In fact, I overheard His Lordship saying as much himself.

== Adaptations ==
Multiple media productions and kabuki based on "Hell Screen" have been produced, including:

- Jigoku-hen, a 1953 Kabuki dramatized by Yukio Mishima.
- Portrait of Hell, a 1969 movie produced by Toho
- A 1962 NHK broadcast television adaptation
- Ukrainian composer Victoria Poleva wrote the 1994 ballet Gagaku, based on Akutagawa's "Hell Screen"
- Episode 12 of Aoi Bungaku, a 2009 animated series directed by Atsuko Ishizuka
- Episode 7 of Bungou to Alchemist: Shinpan no Haguruma, a 2020 animated series directed by Odahiro Watanabe
- "Haunted Places: Ghost Stories" podcast episodes published on Spotify on Feb 10, 2022 (pt 1) and Feb 17, 2022 (pt 2)
- Ryōshū, real name Yoshihide, a character based on Yoshihide that is featured in the 2023 video game Limbus Company created by South Korean studio Project Moon
