= Dragon: the Old Potter's Tale =

Short story by Ryunosuke Akutagawa

- Author: Ryūnosuke Akutagawa
- Original title: 竜 (Ryū)
- Translator: Takashi Kojima, Jay Rubin
- Language: Japanese
- Genre: Short story
- Publisher: Iwanami Shoten Publishing
- Publication date: May 1919
- Publication place: Japan
- English publication date: 1952
- Media type: Print
- Pages: 18

Dragon: the Old Potter's Tale (竜, Ryū) is a short story by Japanese writer Ryūnosuke Akutagawa. It was first published in a 1919 collection of Akutagawa short stories, Akutagawa Ryūnosuke zenshū (芥川龍之介全集). The story is based on a thirteenth-century Japanese tale, with Akutagawa's Taishō literary interpretations of modern psychology and the nature of religion.

== Translation ==
Dragon: the Old Potter's Tale was originally translated into English in 1952 by Takashi Kojima. The only other translation of the work was done by Jay Rubin and published in a collection by Penguin Group.

== Historical background ==
The short story was written at the outset of the Taishō period, a period from about 1912 to 1926 and showcases much of the influence the period had on modern Taishō writers. Like much of Akutagawa's works, it contains a fusion of ancient settings and modern thinkings the mindset of the individual.

== Plot summary ==
The story revolves around a practical joke played by the monk E'in. E'in erects a sign next to the Sarusawa Pond reading "On the third day of the third month, the dragon of this pond will ascend to heaven". However, though E'in intended the joke to affect only those in his immediate area, his sign ends up attracting many from miles around, including many influential lords and his superstitious aunt. A numberless crowd watches the lake faithfully as E'in both scoffs their ignorance and marvels at the turnout. Eventually, the sky darkens and everyone gathered, including E'in, believe they see a dark powerful dragon ascending towards the sky. Afterward, no one will believe E'in's claim that the sign was a practical joke; even E'in, the instigator, believes a dragon from the pond actually flew towards his home.

== Characters in Dragon: the Old Potter's Tale ==
- E'in – a Buddhist monk with the official title "Former Keeper of His Majesty's Storehouse and Master of the Profound Dialogue". People joke about his long protruding nose, leading him to focus more on practical joking than on his religion. At first, he is the only one to know the dragon sign is a joke, but even he is convinced his joke is accurate when he sees a shadowy "dragon" ascend to heaven.
- Emon – a fellow priest who is at first sceptical of the expected ascension of the dragon. However, even his harsh demeanour is perturbed by the signboard proclaiming the fact.
- E'in's aunt – a nun from Sakurai in Settsu Province who comes to see the dragon's ascension. She refuses to be convinced of even the possibility the event will not occur.

== Major themes ==
The major theme of Dragon: the Old Potter's Tale is the nature of religion. Akutagawa leaves everyone, even the man who absolutely knows the information must be false, convinced a vague shadowy image was the figure of a dragon ascending to heaven. As Rubin puts it: "Dragon toys with the likelihood that religion is nothing more than mass hysteria, a force so powerful that even the fabricator of an object of veneration can be taken in by it".

== Allusions ==
The story offers numerous allusions to Buddhism, including legends of dragon ascensions and the calling on the name of the Amida, also known as Amitābha.

== References to actual history and geography ==
The story takes place in and references numerous actual historic locations, including the Kōfukuji Temple, Sakurai, Nara Province, the major Shinto shrine Kasuga Shrine, and many other locations in the Nara area. In addition, the story references the ancient great annual processions of Kyoto, then the imperial Japanese capital.

== Adaptations ==
The story served as the basis for Act 2 (Glory Day) of the musical See What I Wanna See with music and lyrics by Michael John LaChiusa.
