= Chōraku-ji =

Japanese buddhist temple

Coordinates: 34°40′16″N 138°56′33″E

Chōraku-ji 長楽寺
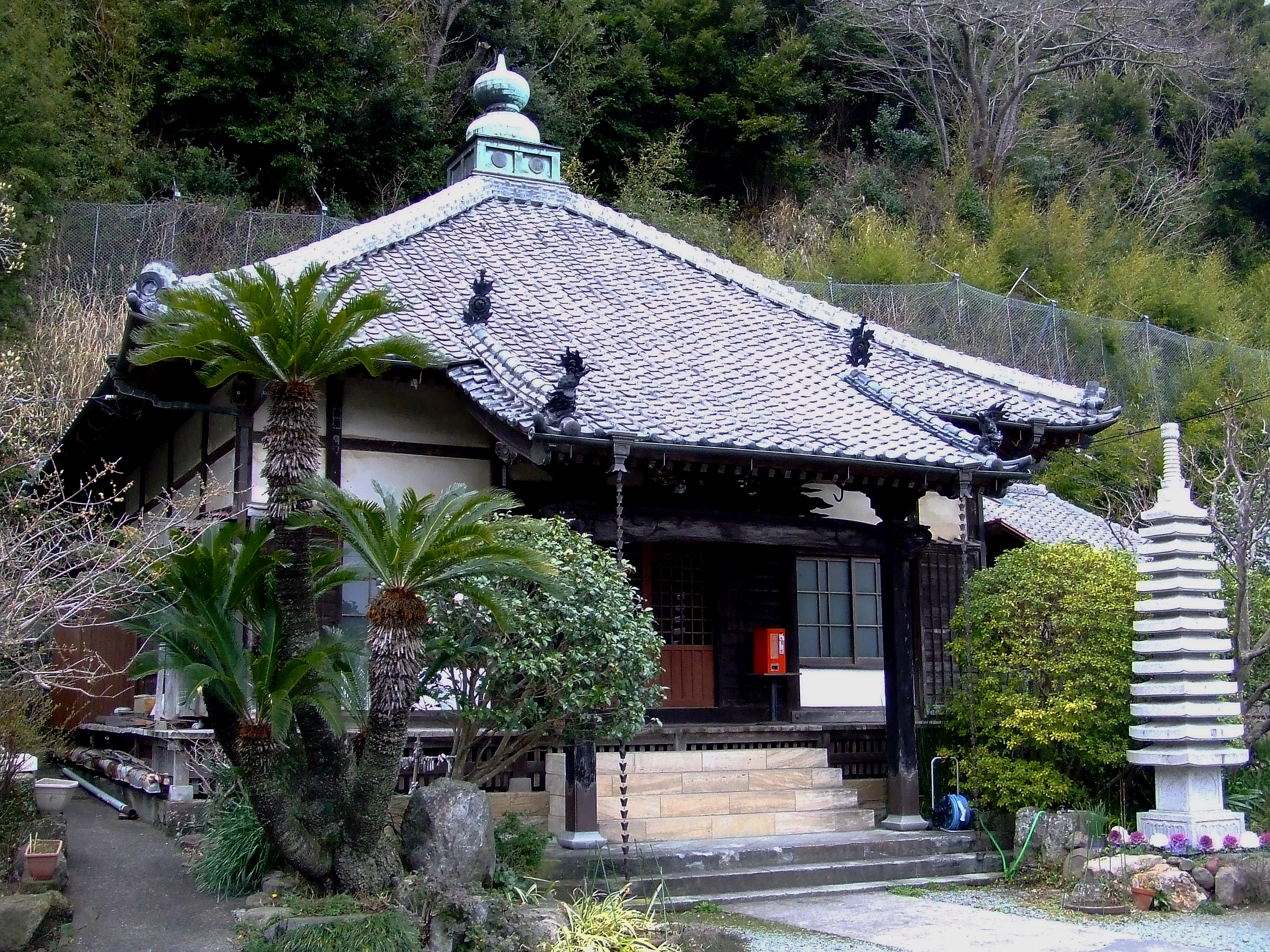
- Chōraku-ji in Shimoda

Religion
- Affiliation: Shingon
- Deity: Kannon Bosatsu

Location
- Location: Shimoda-shi, Shizuoka
- Country: Japan
- Interactive map of Chōraku-ji 長楽寺

Architecture
- Completed: 1555

Website
- https://web.archive.org/web/20090826003221/http://www.izu.co.jp/~p-boo/chorakuji.html

Chōraku-ji (長楽寺) is a small Shingon sect Buddhist temple in Shimoda, Shizuoka Prefecture, Japan. It is noteworthy in that it was the location of the signing of the Treaty of Shimoda in 1855, which officially established diplomatic relations between Bakumatsu Japan and the Russian Empire.

== History ==
Chōraku-ji was founded in 1555, but much of its subsequent history is uncertain.

The temple was commandeered by the Tokugawa shogunate for use as a conference hall during negotiations to end Japan's national isolation policy. The Russian delegation under Vice-Admiral Euphimy Vasil'evich Putiatin, was trapped in Shimoda at the end of 1854 when a tsunami caused by the Ansei Tokai earthquake destroyed their fleet. While a new ship was being constructed in nearby Heda, negotiations proceeded towards a treaty, and on February 7, 1855, the Russo-Japanese treaty of friendship was signed at Chōraku-ji by Putiatin as Russian Imperial Ambassador and Japanese representative Kawaji Toshiakira. The treaty comprised a trade agreement which opened three Japanese harbors (Hakodate, Nagasaki, and Shimoda) to Russia, one more than had been opened to the Americans. Furthermore, the treaty also partially defined the northern borders of Japan in the Kurile Islands with the Russo-Japanese border drawn between Etorofu and Uruppu.
