= A Note to a Certain Old Friend =

Suicide note of Ryūnosuke Akutagawa

A Note to a Certain Old Friend (或旧友へ送る手記, Aru Kyūyū e Okuru Shuki) is the title of the suicide note left by the famed Japanese short story writer Ryūnosuke Akutagawa. This was the last thing Akutagawa wrote before he committed suicide at the age of 35 in 1927. The letter was addressed to his close friend and fellow writer Masao Kume.

Akutagawa begins the note by stating his reason for his decision. He mentions that the author Régnier wrote in one of his short stories that no one who commits suicide fully knows why they do. "A vague sense of anxiety about my own future" is the reason Akutagawa gives.

Next, he goes on to write that he had been thinking about death for the last two years with a specific interest in the process of death itself. He writes that A Fool's Life describes his thoughts completely except for the "social factor" which he purposely omitted from the story. "I think I analyzed it all in 'A Fool's Life', except for a social factor, namely the shadow of feudalism cast over my life".

Akutagawa then writes his thought process on how he came to decide on the manner of his death. He does this in a straightforward calculated fashion. He states that he does not believe, unlike "the Westerners", that suicide is a sin. He decides to commit the act in the least painful way possible and researches each manner of death to find the best way. He dismissed a variety of ways to commit suicide "for aesthetic and practical reasons". Finally, he concludes that death by drugs in his house is the best option, despite the hassle it might cause his family. He writes that he feels that he has enough courage to do it alone, without a partner. This whole process, he writes, took him several months to prepare.

Akutagawa then writes that he feels that humans have an animal fear of death and that his fear has been drained out of his body, so much so that he cannot enjoy food or women.

Lastly, he reassures his friend that he does not want to elevate himself to the status of a god, but that he is no more than an ordinary man. He remembers a conversation about "Empedocles on Etna" Kume and he had twenty years prior, in which he stated that he, at that time, did wish to be a god.
