= Geoffrey Bownas =

Geoffrey Bownas CBE (9 February 1923 – 17 February 2011) was a British academic who specialised in Japanese studies.

== Early life ==
He was born in Yeadon, Yorkshire to Methodist parents. He was awarded a state scholarship to Bradford Grammar School and later won a Hastings scholarship for The Queen's College, Oxford. His studies were interrupted by the Second World War, when he worked at Bletchley Park to decipher the Japanese military codes. He was promoted to lieutenant in the Intelligence Corps and sent to India. He was demobilised early so that he could complete his degree and he won a first in Greats.

== Academic career ==
After a brief spell teaching at Aberystwyth University, in 1948 he returned to Oxford to study under Homer Hasenpflug Dubs and won a second first-class degree in Chinese. He planned to study in China but after the founding of the People's Republic in 1949 he instead studied for two years at Kyoto University, where he studied under Kaizuka Shigeki.

In 1954 Bownas founded the Department of Japanese Studies at Oxford and in 1965 he was appointed to the Japanese Department at the University of Sheffield, where he was the university's first professor of Japanese studies. Bownas acquired a specialised knowledge of Japanese business practices, especially the motor industry. He got to know leading Japanese industrialists and was appointed as a consultant to the companies who built Kansai International Airport. Bownas also served as a Japanese interpreter for the BBC during the Tokyo 1964 Summer Olympics.

In 1970 Bownas worked with Japanese writer Yukio Mishima on an anthology of new writing in Japan. He co-authored Business in Japan: A Guide to Japanese Business Practice and Procedure with Paul Norbury (1974).

In 1973 he was given a Tanaka grant by the Japanese prime minister to further Japanese language studies in Britain. He retired in 1980.

== Personal life ==
In 1999 Bownas was awarded the Japanese Order of the Sacred Treasure and in 2003 he was made CBE for his contributions to education and the improvement of Anglo-Japanese relations. In 2009 Bownas married Wiesa Janina Cook. He had two daughters from a previous marriage.

== Works ==
- Japanese Rainmaking and Other Folk Practices (London: George Allen & Unwin, 1963).
- From Japanology to Japanese Studies: Inaugural Lecture Delivered 14 December 1966 (Sheffield: University of Sheffield Press, 1967).
- New Writing in Japan (London: Penguin, 1972). ISBN 9780140034264
- Business in Japan: A Guide to Japanese Business Practice and Procedure, co-authored with Paul Norbury (London: Macmillan, 1974). ISBN 9780333157084
- Japan's Strategy for the 1980's: In Industrial Electrical & Electronic Equipment (British Electrical and Allied Manufacturers' Association, 1981).
- Inside Japan (BBC Books, 1981). ISBN 9780563163008
- Japan and the New Europe: Industrial Strategies and Options in the 1990s (Economist Intelligence Unit, 1991). ISBN 9780850583861
- Hi-Tech Venturers: Entrepreneurs of Modern Japan, co-authored with Maureen Bownas (Continuum International Publishing Group Ltd, 1994). ISBN 0485113724
- Doing Business with the Japanese: A One-stop Guide to Japanese Business Practice, co-authored with David Powers and Christopher Philip Hood (Direct Image, 2003). ISBN 9780953746514
- Japanese Journeys: Writings and Recollections (Folkestone, Kent: Global Oriental). ISBN 9781905246014
