= Victoria Poleva =

Ukrainian composer (born 1962)

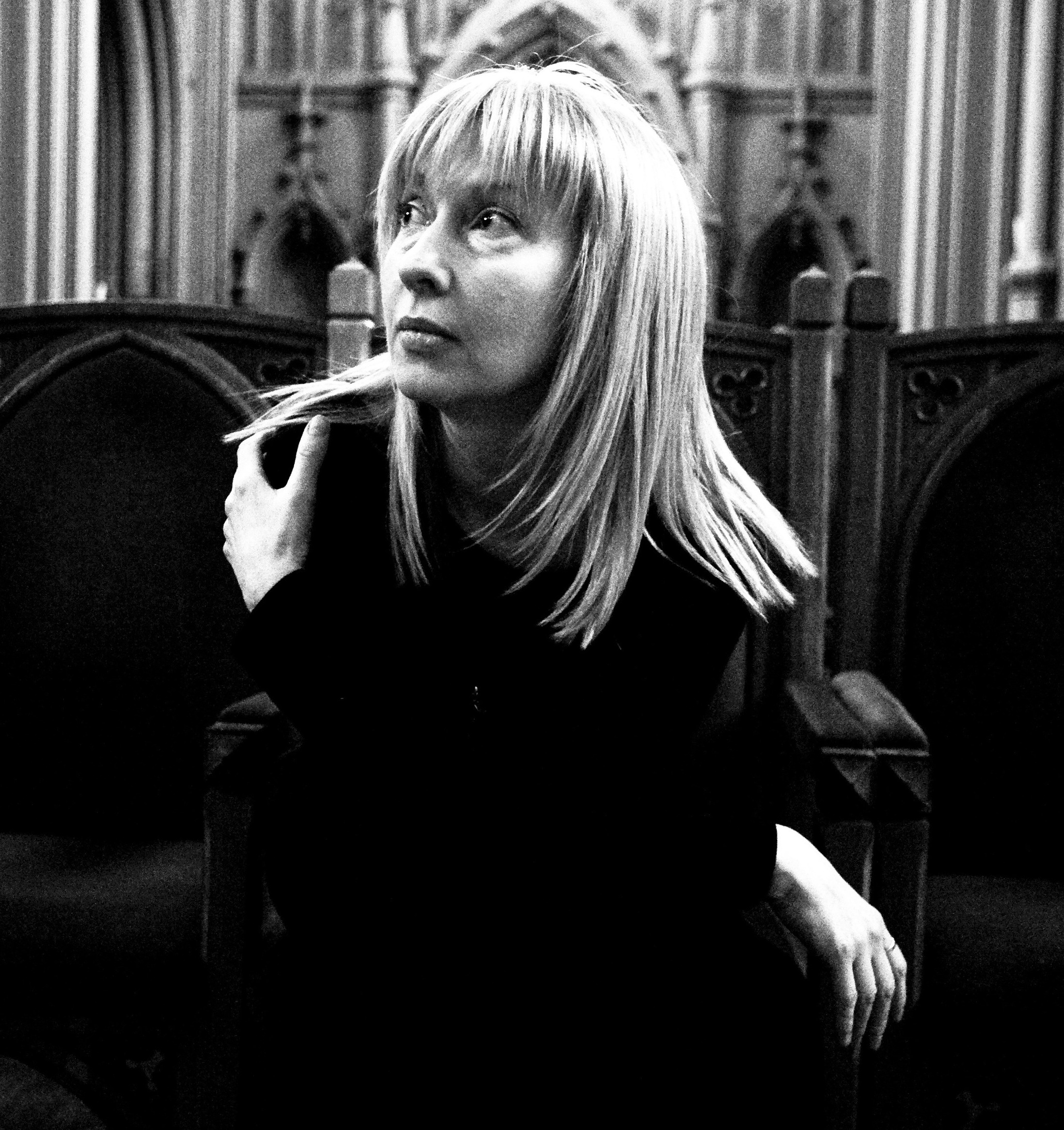
Victoria Polyova

Victoria Vita Polyova (Note: Also spelled Polevá) (Ukrainian: Вікторія Валеріївна Польова, romanized: Viktoriia Valeriivna Poliova; born September 11, 1962) is a Ukrainian composer. She was the Shevchenko National Prize laureate of 2018.

== Early life and education ==
Born on September 11, 1962, in Kyiv, Ukraine, Victoria Polyova is the daughter of composer Valery Polyovyj. She graduated from Kyiv Conservatory in 1989, then completed post-graduate studies completed there in 1995.

== Career ==
From 1990–1998, Polyova was a lecturer in the faculty of composition, then from 2000–2005 at the Music Information Technologies Department of the Kyiv Conservatory. Since 2005 she has been a freelance composer. In both 2014 and 2015 she was a member of the jury of the International Composers Competition "Sacrarium" in Italy.

In 2006, Polyova was composer-in-residence at the Menhir Chamber Music Festival (Swiss, Graubunden). Since 2006 the Swiss agency "Sordino Ediziuns Musicalas" has been publishing her works.

In 2011, Polyova was invited by Gidon Kremer as composer-in-residence at the XXX Lockenhaus Chamber Music Festival (Austria).

In 2013, Polyova was composer-in-residence at Festival of Contemporary Music Darwin Vargas (Chile, Valparaiso)

== Awards and honours ==
Polyova is a laureate of the Municipal Prize "Kyiv" in honour of Artemy Vedel (2013), winner of the Spherical Music international competition (USA, 2008), a Laureate of the Prize of the Ministry of Culture and Tourism of Ukraine instituted in honour of Borys Lyatoshynsky (2005), a Winner of the All-Ukrainian Competition "Psalms of the Third Millennium" (2001, 1st prize) and a Laureate of the Prize of the Ministry of Culture and Arts of Ukraine instituted in honour of Levko Revutsky (1995).
