= Ryūnosuke Akutagawa =

Japanese writer (1892–1927)

- 芥川 龍之介
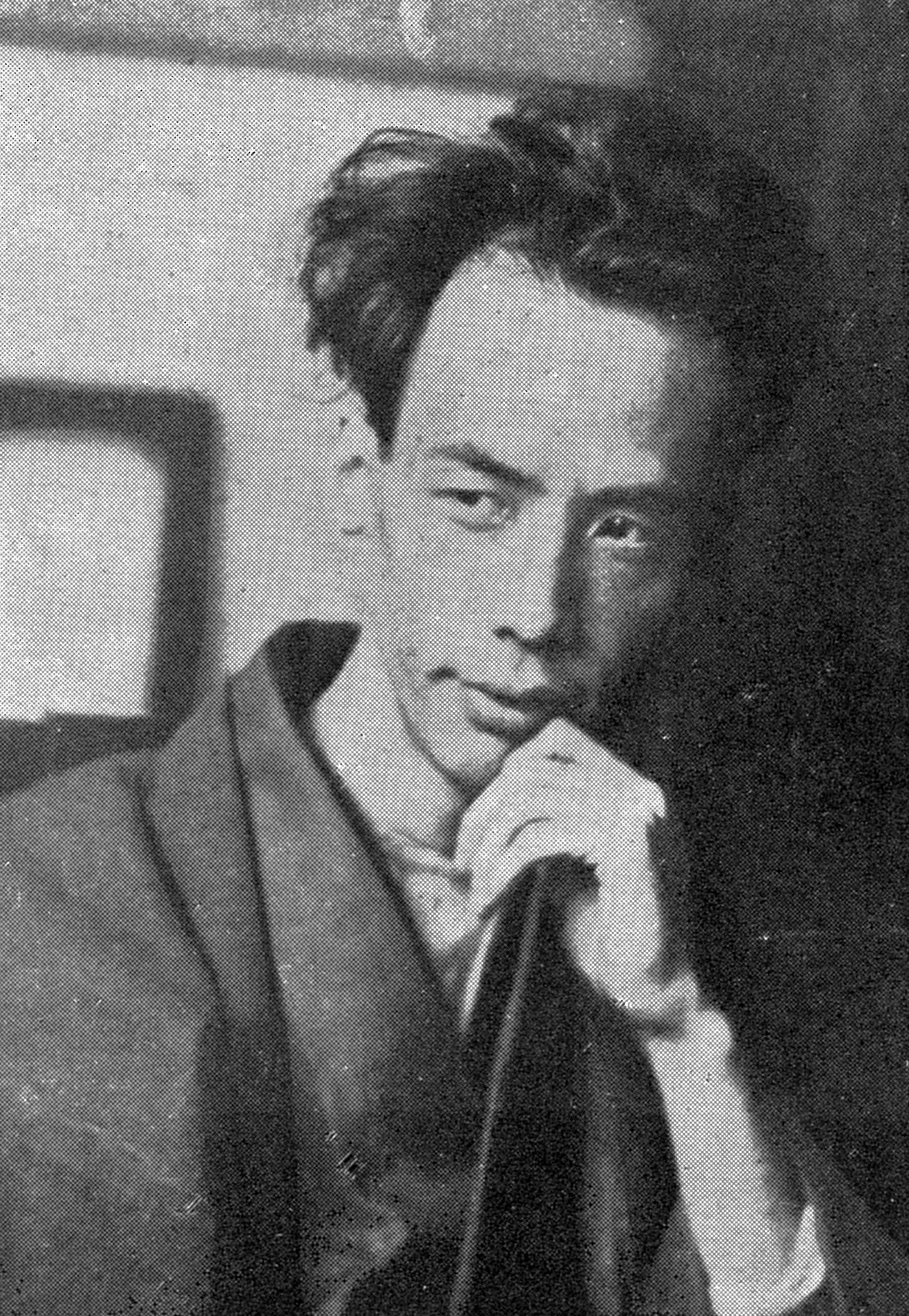
- Akutagawa in 1927
- Born: Ryūnosuke Niihara (新原 龍之介); 1 March 1892; Kyōbashi, Tokyo, Empire of Japan
- Died: 24 July 1927 (aged 35); Tokyo, Empire of Japan
- Education: Tokyo Imperial University
- Occupation: Writer
- Spouse: Fumi Akutagawa
- Children: Hiroshi Akutagawa; Takashi Akutagawa; Yasushi Akutagawa
- Writing career
- Language: Japanese
- Genre: Short stories
- Notable works: In a Grove; Rashōmon; Hana; Hell Screen
- Movement: Modernism

Japanese name
- Kanji: 芥川 龍之介
- Hiragana: あくたがわ りゅうのすけ
Transcriptions
- Romanization: Akutagawa Ryūnosuke

Ryūnosuke Akutagawa (芥川 龍之介, Akutagawa Ryūnosuke; Japanese pronunciation: [ɾʲɯː.no.sɯ̥.ke], 1 March 1892 – 24 July 1927), art name Chōkōdō Shujin (澄江堂主人), was a Japanese writer active in the Taishō period in Japan. He is regarded as the "father of the Japanese short story", and Japan's premier literary award, the Akutagawa Prize, is named after him. He took his own life at the age of 35 through an overdose of barbital.

== Early life ==
Ryūnosuke Akutagawa was born in Irifune, Kyōbashi, Tokyo City (present-day Akashi, Chūō, Tokyo), the eldest son of businessman Toshizō Niihara and his wife, Fuku. His father served in the Boshin War, and later founded a successful dairy business. His mother experienced mental illness shortly after his birth, so he was adopted and raised by the family of his maternal uncle, Michiaki Akutagawa, from whom he received the Akutagawa family name. The Akutagawa lineage was part of the warrior class and served the Tokugawa clan as okubōzu, who managed the tearoom and served tea. The Akutagawas looked down upon Ryūnosuke's father as a "parvenu". Ryūnosuke's adoptive family enjoyed art. He was interested in classical Chinese literature from an early age, as well as in the works of Mori Ōgai and Natsume Sōseki.

He entered the First Higher School in 1910, without taking entrance exams thanks to his middle school academic record, and developed relationships with classmates such as Kan Kikuchi, Masao Kume, Yūzō Yamamoto, and Tsuchiya Bunmei, all of whom would later become authors. He began writing after entering Tokyo Imperial University (now the University of Tokyo) in 1913, where he studied English literature. While still a student, he proposed marriage to a childhood friend, Yayoi Yoshida, but his adoptive family did not approve of the union. In 1916 he became engaged to Fumi Tsukamoto, whom he married in 1918. They had three children: Hiroshi Akutagawa (1920–1981) was an actor, Takashi Akutagawa (1922–1945) was killed as a student draftee in Burma, and Yasushi Akutagawa (1925–1989) was a composer.

Following graduation, Akutagawa taught briefly at the Naval Engineering School in Yokosuka, Kanagawa as an English language instructor, before deciding to devote his efforts to writing fulltime.

== Literary career ==
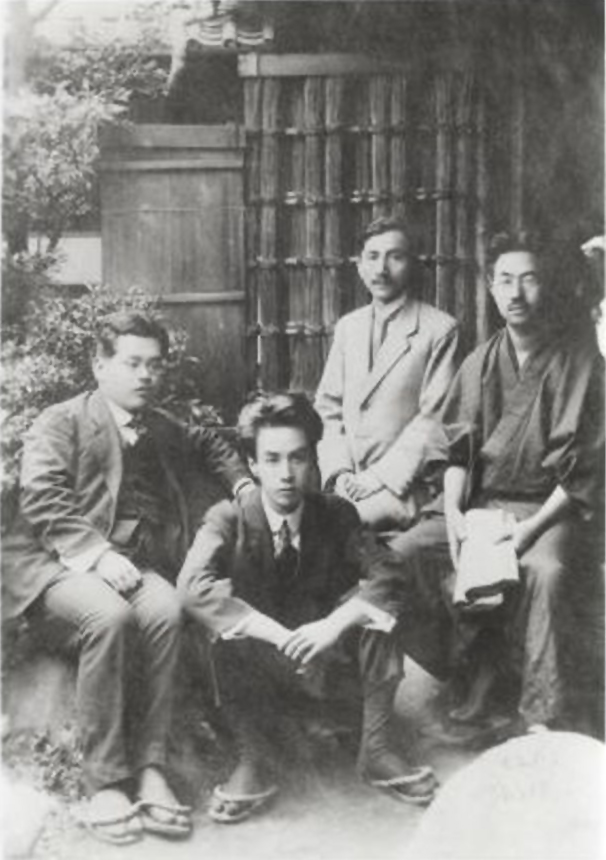
Photograph dated 1919. The second subject from the left is Akutagawa. On the far left is Kan Kikuchi.

In 1914, Akutagawa and his former high school friends revived the literary journal Shinshichō ("New Currents of Thought"), where they published translations of William Butler Yeats and Anatole France along with works they had written themselves. Akutagawa published his second short story Rashōmon the following year in the literary magazine Teikoku Bungaku ("Imperial Literature"), while still a student. The story, based on a twelfth-century tale, was not well received by Akutagawa's friends, who greatly criticized it. Nonetheless, Akutagawa gathered up the courage to visit his idol, Natsume Sōseki, in December 1915 for Sōseki's weekly literary circles. In November, he published the work in the literary magazine Teikoku Mongaku. In early 1916 he published Hana ("The Nose", 1916), which received a letter of praise from Sōseki and secured Akutagawa his first taste of fame.

It was also at this time that Akutagawa started writing haiku under the haigo (pen name) Gaki (我鬼). Akutagawa followed with a series of short stories set in Heian period, Edo period or early Meiji period Japan. These stories reinterpreted classical works and historical incidents often revolving around the Konjaku Monogatarishū. Examples of these stories include: Gesaku zanmai ("Absorbed in Letters", 1917) and Kareno-shō ("Gleanings from a Withered Field", 1918), Jigokuhen ("Hell Screen", 1918); Hōkyōnin no Shi ("The Death of a Disciple", 1918), and Butōkai ("The Ball", 1920). Akutagawa was a strong opponent of naturalism. He published Mikan ("Mandarin Oranges", 1919) and Aki ("Autumn", 1920) which have more modern settings.

In 1921, Akutagawa interrupted his writing career to spend four months in China, as a reporter for the Osaka Mainichi Shinbun. The trip was stressful and he suffered from various illnesses, from which his health would never recover. Shortly after his return he published Yabu no naka ("In a Grove", 1922). During the trip, Akutagawa visited numerous cities of central and southeastern China including Nanjing, Shanghai, Hangzhou and Suzhou. Before his trip, he wrote a short story entitled Nankin no Kirisuto ("The Christ of Nanjing"). It presents the Chinese Christian community according to his own imaginative vision of Nanjing, as influenced by classical Chinese literature.

=== Influences ===
Akutagawa's stories were influenced by his belief that the practice of literature should be universal and could bring together Western and Japanese cultures. The idea can be seen in the way that Akutagawa used existing works from a variety of cultures and time periods and either rewrites the story with modern sensibilities or creates new stories using ideas from multiple sources. Culture and the formation of a cultural identity is also a major theme in several of his works. In these stories, he explores the formation of cultural identity during periods in history where Japan was most open to outside influences. An example of this is his story Hōkyōnin no Shi ("The Death of a Disciple", 1918) which is set in the early missionary period.

The portrayal of women in Akutagawa's stories was mainly shaped by the influence of three women who acted as his mother figures. Most significant was his biological mother Fuku, from whom he worried about inheriting her madness. Although Akutagawa was removed from Fuku eight months after his birth, he identified strongly with her and believed that, if at any moment he might go mad, life was meaningless. His aunt Fuki played the most prominent role in his upbringing, controlling much of Akutagawa's life as well as demanding much of his attention, especially as she grew older. The women who appear in Akutagawa's stories, much like his mother figures, were for the most part written as dominating, aggressive, deceitful, and selfish. Conversely, men were often represented as the victims of such women.

Akutagawa found a lot of influence from China throughout his life as well. His favorite novels from when he was younger were Chinese epics like Journey to the West (西游记), and Water Margin (水浒传) which he later goes to see at various theaters during his trip, writing extensively about them in his travelogue. Akutagwa's narrative style being fragmentary and anecdotal displays in some part how he was influenced by the Chinese classics. His trip to China in 1921 influenced his works and worldview in ways which can be seen predominately in the growing disillusionment present in his later works. The way that his writing interacts with modernity and the classics shows that his writing influences spanned further than just Japan.

== Later life ==
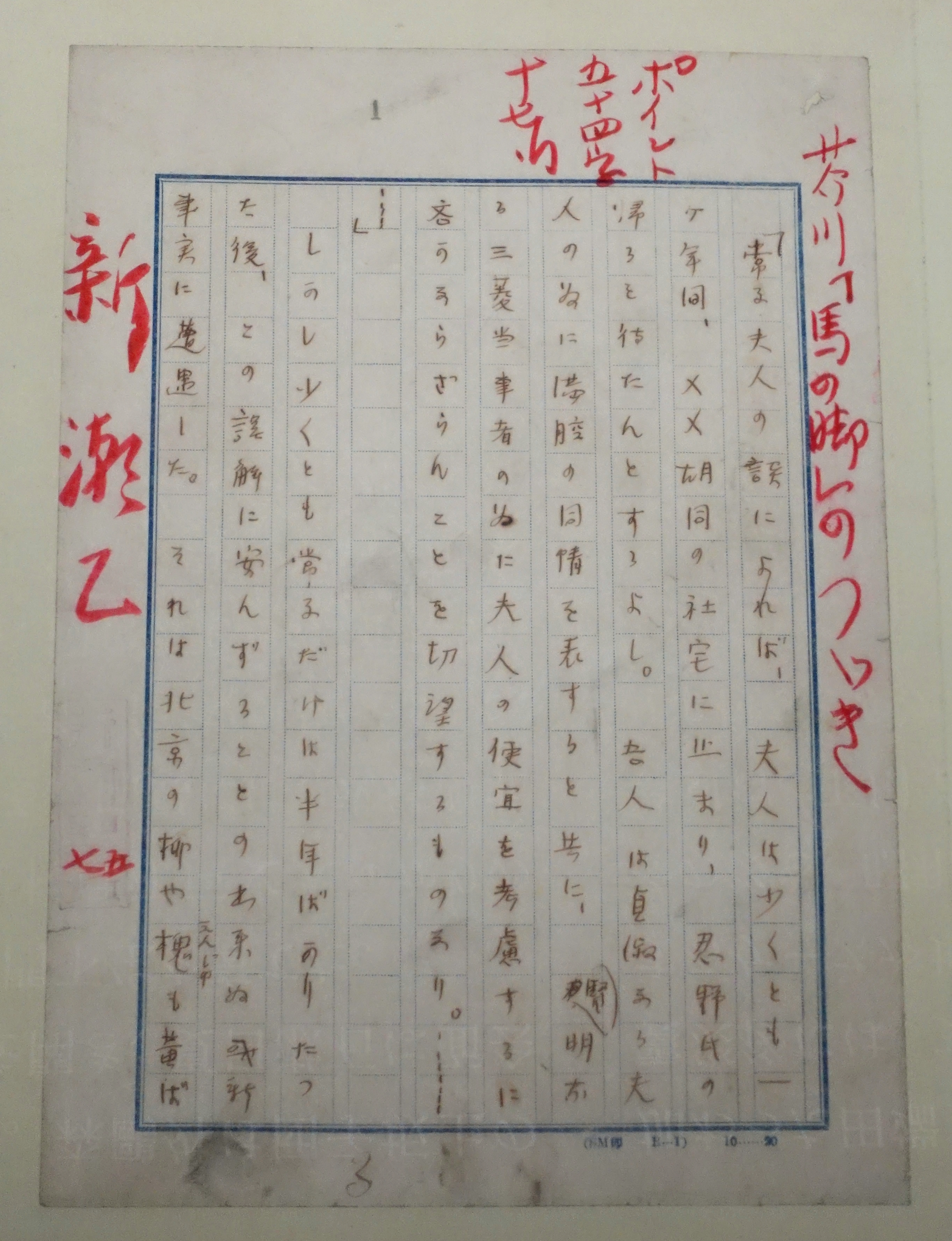
A manuscript page of "Horse Legs", 1925

The final phase of Akutagawa's literary career was marked by deteriorating physical and mental health. Much of his work during this period is distinctly autobiographical, some with text taken directly from his diaries. His works during this period include Daidōji Shinsuke no hansei ("The Early Life of Daidōji Shinsuke", 1925) and Tenkibo ("Death Register", 1926).

At this time, Akutagawa had a highly publicized dispute with Jun'ichirō Tanizaki over the importance of structure versus lyricism in stories. Akutagawa argued that structure (how the story was told) was more important than the content or plot of the story, whereas Tanizaki argued the opposite.

Akutagawa's final works include Kappa (1927), a satire based on the eponymous creature from Japanese folklore, Haguruma ("Spinning Gears" or "Cogwheels", 1927), Aru ahō no isshō ("A Fool's Life" or "The Life of a Stupid Man"), and Bungeiteki na, amari ni bungeiteki na ("Literary, All Too Literary", 1927).

Towards the end of his life, Akutagawa suffered from visual hallucinations and anxiety over the fear that he had inherited his mother's mental disorder. In 1927, he survived a suicide attempt, together with a friend of his wife. He later died of suicide after taking an overdose of Veronal, which had been given to him by Mokichi Saitō on 24 July of the same year. In his suicide note titled A Note to a Certain Old Friend (或旧友へ送る手記, Aru Kyūyū e Okuru Shuki) (addressed to his friend Masao Kume) he wrote that he felt a "vague sense of unease" (ぼんやりした不安, bon'yari shita fuan) about his future. He was 35 years old.

== Legacy ==
During the course of his short life, Akutagawa wrote 150 short stories. A number of these have been adapted into other media. Akira Kurosawa's famous 1950 film Rashōmon retells Akutagawa's "In a Grove", with the title and the frame scenes set in the Rashomon Gate taken from Akutagawa's "Rashōmon". Ukrainian composer Victoria Poleva wrote the ballet Gagaku (1994), based on Akutagawa's "Hell Screen". Japanese composer Mayako Kubo wrote an opera entitled Rashomon, based on Akutagawa's story. The German version premiered in Graz, Austria in 1996, and the Japanese version in Tokyo in 2002. The central conceit of the story (i.e. conflicting accounts of the same events from different points of view, with none "definitive") has entered into storytelling as an accepted trope.

In 1930, Tatsuo Hori, a writer, who saw himself as a disciple of Akutagawa, published his short story "Sei kazoku" (literally "The Holy Family"), which was written under the impression of Akutagawa's death and even made reference to the dead mentor in the shape of the deceased character Kuki. In 1935, Akutagawa's lifelong friend Kan Kikuchi established the literary award for promising new writers, the Akutagawa Prize, in his honor.

Akutagawa is featured as a character in the anime franchise Bungo Stray Dogs.

In 2020 NHK produced and aired the film A Stranger in Shanghai. It depicts Akutagawa's time as a reporter in the city and stars Ryuhei Matsuda.

=== Reception ===
Akutagawa's works have had many different interpretations and stances based on both the time period in his own life as well as various periods after his death. While not a monolith, the most prevalent viewpoints and trends are as follows.

The initial reactions to Akutagawa's works in the 20's and 30's as they were being released come from the Marxist critics and thinkers and were primarily negative in nature. He was generally thought to be a bourgeois writer who wrote in an overly convoluted way just for the sake of it. Rather than having a firm message, it was understood that he was in pursuit of aesthetics rather than social reality or class struggles. Given the time of the Marxist movement in Japan and his suicide in 1927, this too was included in his reception. People took his suicide as a sign of psychological instability and the end of an era. Akutagawa was seen as a symbol of both literary and psychological decline in modern Japan.

After World War II, Japan sought to distance his work from politics. In doing so, his critiques became much more favorable heralding him as a master craftsman. He was re-evaluated based on his writing style, literary technique, and psychological content rather than any political or social standpoints. Through this he was established as a leading figure in modern Japanese literature.

In the 1970s a new movement focused on reassessing literature through the lens of formalism and philosophy, most significantly in Akutagawa's case, on Epistemology. His work was then analyzed largely for things like ambiguity and consciousness. He began to be recognized as a philosophical thinker moreso than a political thinker or writer. In looking at the content of his works, commonalities emerged pertaining to the narrative ambiguity and fragmentary nature of his writing style. Though some of these aspects did come about from his influences the underlying sentiment was that he reworked these things into his own brand of epistemological philosophy.

More recent thought tends to look towards revisiting political critique and reinterpreting it. Marxist critique in particular is revisited factoring out Akutagawa's mental health since it was used in a negative light back then. Rather than dismissing his problems, they're looked at in a more neutral capacity. There was an ideological conflict going on at the time and instead of taking just the leading thought, both sides are explored. His suicide was not longer viewed as a weakness or him succumbing to his bourgeois ways, but as a product of fragmentation and epistemological crisis. Other thoughts endeavor to say that he was actually more left leaning, not apolitical, as they claim that his later works make it a point to criticize capitalism and industrial society using not realism, but allegory as a social critic.

== Selected works ==
Year	Japanese title	English title(s)	English translator(s)
1914	老年; Rōnen	"Old Age"	Ryan Choi
1915	羅生門; Rashōmon	"Rashōmon"	Glen Anderson; Takashi Kojima; Jay Rubin; Glenn W. Shaw
1916	鼻 Hana	"The Nose"	Glen Anderson; Takashi Kojima; Jay Rubin; Glen W. Shaw
1916	芋粥; Imogayu	"Yam Gruel"	Takashi Kojima
1916	手巾; Hankechi	"The Handkerchief"	Charles De Wolf; Glenn W. Shaw
1916	煙草と悪魔; Tabako to Akuma	"Tobacco and the Devil"	Glenn W. Shaw
1917	尾形了斎覚え書; Ogata Ryōsai Oboe gaki	"Dr. Ogata Ryosai: Memorandum"	Jay Rubin
1917	戯作三昧; Gesaku zanmai	"Absorbed in Letters"	
1917	首が落ちた話; Kubi ga ochita hanashi	"The Story of a Head That Fell Off"	Jay Rubin
1918	蜘蛛の糸; Kumo no Ito	"The Spider's Thread"	Dorothy Britton; Charles De Wolf; Bryan Karetnyk; Takashi Kojima; Howard Norman; Jay Rubin; Glenn W. Shaw
1918	地獄変; Jigokuhen	"Hell Screen"	Bryan Karetnyk; Takashi Kojima; Howard Norman; W.H.H. Norman; Jay Rubin
1918	枯野抄; Kareno shō	"A Commentary on the Desolate Field for Bashou", or "O’er a Withered Moor"	Glenn W. Shaw; Charles De Wolf
1918	邪宗門; Jashūmon	"Jashūmon"	W.H.H. Norman
1918	奉教人の死; Hōkyōnin no Shi	"The Martyr", or "The Death of a Disciple"	Takashi Kojima; Charles De Wolf
1918	袈裟と盛遠; Kesa to Moritō	"Kesa and Morito"	Howard Hibbett; Takashi Kojima; Charles De Wolf
1919	開花の良人; Kaika no Otto	"An Enlightened Husband"	Charles De Wolf
1919	魔術; Majutsu	"Magic"	
1919	竜 Ryū	"Dragon: the Old Potter's Tale", or "The Dragon"	Jay Rubin; Takashi Kojima
1920	舞踏会; Butōkai	"A Ball"	Glenn W. Shaw
1920	秋 Aki	"Autumn"	Charles De Wolf
1920	南京の基督; Nankin no Kirisuto	"Christ in Nanking"	Van C. Gessel
1920	杜子春; Toshishun	"Tu Tze-chun"	Dorothy Britton
1920	アグニの神; Aguni no Kami	"Agni"	Glen Anderson
1921	山鴫; Yama-shigi	"A Snipe"	
1921	秋山図; Shūzanzu	"Autumn Mountain"	
1921	上海游記; Shanhai Yūki	"A Report on the Journey of Shanghai"	
1922	藪の中; Yabu no Naka	"In a Grove," or "In a Bamboo Grove"	Glen Anderson; Bryan Karetnyk; Takashi Kojima; Jay Rubin
1922	庭 Niwa	"The Garden"	Takashi Kojima & John McVittie; Charles De Wolf; Lane Dunlop
1922	一夕話; Issekiwa	"An Evening Conversation"	Charles De Wolf
1922	将軍; Shōgun	"The General"	Bryan Karetnyk; W.H.H. Norman
1922	トロッコ; Torokko	"Minecart"	
1923	保吉の手帳から; Yasukichi no Techō kara	"From Yasukichi's Notebook"	
1923	侏儒の言葉; Shuju no Kotoba	"Aphorisms by a Pygmy"	
1924	一塊の土; Ikkai no Tsuchi	"A Clod of Earth"	Takashi Kojima
1924	創作; Sousaku	"Writer's Craft"	Jay Rubin
1925	大導寺信輔の半生; Daidōji Shinsuke no Hansei	"Daidōji Shinsuke: The Early Years"	Jay Rubin
1926	点鬼簿; Tenkibo	"Death Register"	Jay Rubin
1927	玄鶴山房; Genkaku Sanbō	"Genkaku Sanbo"	Takashi Kojima
1927	蜃気楼; Shinkirō	"A Mirage"	
1927	河童; Kappa	"Kappa"	Geoffrey Bownas; Seiichi Shiojiri
1927	仙人; Sennin	"The Wizard"	Charles De Wolf
1927	文芸的な、余りに文芸的な; Bungei-teki na, amarini Bungei-teki na	"Literary, All-Too-Literary"	
1927	歯車; Haguruma	"Spinning Gears" or "Cogwheels"	Charles De Wolf; Howard Norman; Jay Rubin; Bryan Karetnyk
1927	或阿呆の一生; Aru Ahō no Isshō	"A Fool's Life" or "The Life of a Fool"	Charles De Wolf; Jay Rubin
1927	西方の人; Saihō no Hito	"The Man of the West"	
1927	或旧友へ送る手記; Aru Kyūyū e Okuru Shuki	"A Note to a Certain Old Friend"	

== Works in English translation ==
- Eminent Authors of Contemporary Japan, Vol. 2. Trans. Eric S. Bell & Eiji Ukai. Tokyo: Kaitakusha, 1930(?).

The Spider's Web.--The Autumn.--The Nose.

- Tales Grotesque and Curious. Trans. Glenn W. Shaw. Tokyo: The Hokuseido Press, 1930.

Tobacco and the devil.--The nose.--The handkerchief.--Rashōmon.--Lice.--The spider's thread.--The wine worm.--The badger.--The ball.--The pipe.--Mōri Sensei.

- Hell Screen and Other Stories. Trans. W.H.H. Norman. Tokyo: The Hokuseido Press, 1948.

Jigokuhen.--Jashūmon.--The General.--Mensura Zoilii.

- Kappa. Trans. Seiichi Shiojiri. Tokyo: The Hokuseido Press, 1951.
- The Three Treasures. Trans. Sasaki Takamasa. Tokyo: The Hokuseido Press, 1951.
- The Real Tripitaka and Other Pieces. George Allen & Unwin Ltd., 1952.

"San Sebastian" translated by Arthur Waley.

- Rashomon and Other Stories. Trans. Takashi Kojima. Charles E. Tuttle Co., 1952.

In a Grove.--Rashomon.--Yam Gruel.--The Martyr.--Kesa and Morito.--The Dragon.
Not to be confused with a book of the same title that contains translations by Shaw, published by Hara Shobo in 1964 and reprinted in 1976.

- Modern Japanese Literature: An Anthology. Compiled and edited by Donald Keene. Grove Atlantic, 1956. ISBN 9780802150950

"Kesa and Morito" translated by Howard Hibbett; "Hell Screen" translated by W.H.H. Norman.

- Modern Japanese Stories: An Anthology. UNESCO, 1961.

"Autumn Mountain" translated by Ivan Morris.

- Posthumous Works of Ryunosuke Akutagawa: His Life, Suicide, & Christ. Trans. Akio Inoue. 1961.

A Note Forwarded to a Certain Old Friend.--Life of a Certain Fool.--Western Man.--Western Man Continued.

- Japanese Short Stories. Trans. Takashi Kojima. New York: Liveright Pub. Corp., 1961.

The Hell Screen.--A Clod of Soil.--Nezumi-Kozo.--Heichu, the Amorous Genius.--Genkaku-Sanbo.--Otomi's Virginity.--The Spider's Thread.--The Nose.--The Tangerines.--The Story of Yonosuke.

- Exotic Japanese stories: The Beautiful and the Grotesque. Trans. Takashi Kojima & John McVittie. New York: Liveright Pub. Corp., 1964.

The Robbers.--The Dog, Shiro.--The Handkerchief.--The Dolls.--Gratitude.--The Faith of Wei Shêng.--The Lady, Roku-no-miya.--The Kappa.--Saigô Takamori.--The Greeting.--Withered Fields.--Absorbed in letters.--The Garden.--The Badger.--Heresy (Jashumon).--A Woman's Body.
Reissued by Liveright in 2010 as The Beautiful and the Grotesque.

- Tu Tze-Chun. Trans. Dorothy Britton. Tokyo: Kodansha International, 1965.
- Kappa. Trans. Geoffrey Bownas. London: Peter Owen Publishers, 1970. ISBN 072064870X
- A Fool's Life. Trans. Will Petersen. New York: Grossman Publishers, 1970. ISBN 0670323500
- La fille au chapeau rouge. Trans. Lalloz ed. Picquier (1980). in ISBN 978-2-87730-200-5 (French edition)
- Cogwheels and Other Stories. Trans. Howard Norman. Oakville, Ontario: Mosaic Press, 1982. ISBN 0889621772

Cogwheels.--Hell Screen.--The Spider's Thread.

- The Spider's Thread and Other Stories. Trans. Dorothy Britton. Tokyo: Kodansha International, 1987. ISBN 4061860275

The Spider's Thread.--The Art of the Occult.--Tu Tze-chun.--The Wagon.--The Tangerines.-- The Nose.-- The Dolls.-- Whitie.

- Hell screen. Cogwheels. A Fool's Life. Eridanos Press, 1987. ISBN 0941419029

Reprints Kojima and Petersen translations; "Cogwheels" translated by Cid Corman and Susumu Kamaike.

- Akutagawa & Dazai: Instances of Literary Adaptation. Trans. James O'Brien. Tempe, Arizona: Arizona State University Press, 1988. ISBN 093925218X

The Clown's Mask.--The Immortal.--Rashō Gate.--Hell Screen.--Within a Grove.--The Shadow.

- The Kyoto Collection: Stories from the Japanese. 1989

"The Faint Smiles of the Gods" translated by Tomoyoshi Genkawa & Bernard Susser.

- Travels in China (Shina yuki). Trans. Joshua Fogel. Chinese Studies in History 30, no. 4 (1997).
- The Essential Akutagawa. New York: Marsilio Publishers, 1999. ISBN 1568860617

Rashomon.--The Nose.--Kesa and Morito.--The Spider's Thread.--Hell Screen.--The Ball.--Tu Tze-chun.--Autumn Mountain.--In a Grove.--The Faint Smiles of the Gods.--San Sebastian.--Cogwheels.--A Fool's Life.--A Note to a Certain Old Friend.
"Rashomon," "The Nose," "The Spider's Thread," "The Ball," & "In a Grove" translated by Seiji M. Lippit; "A Note to a Certain Old Friend" translated by Beongcheon Yu. Reprints translations by Britton, Corman & Kamaike, Genkawa & Susser, Hibbett, Kojima, Morris, Petersen, & Waley.

- Rashomon and Seventeen Other Stories. Trans. Jay Rubin. Penguin Classics, 2006. ISBN 0140449701

Rashomon.--In a Bamboo Grove.--The Nose.--Dragon: The Old Potter's Tale.--The Spider Thread.--Hell Screen.--Dr. Ogata Ryosai: Memorandum.--O-Gin.--Loyalty.--The Story of a Head That Fell Off.--Green Onions.--Horse Legs.--Daidoji Shinsuke: The Early Years.--The Writer's Craft.--The Baby's Sickness.--Death Register.--The Life of a Stupid Man.--Spinning Gears.

- The Columbia Anthology of Modern Japanese Literature, Vol. 1: From Restoration to Occupation, 1868-1945. New York: Columbia University Press, 2005. ISBN 0231118600

"The Nose" translated by Ivan Morris and "Christ of Nanking" translated by Van C. Gessel; also has three of Akutagawas haikus translated by Makoto Ueda.

- A Fool's Life. Trans. Anthony Barnett & Toraiwa Naoko. Lewes, England: Allardyce Books, 2007. ISBN 9780907954354
- Mandarins. Trans. Charles De Wolf. Archipelago Books, 2007. ISBN 9780977857609

Mandarins.--At the Seashore.--An Evening Conversation.--The Handkerchief.--An Enlightened Husband.--Autumn.--Winter.--Fortune.--Kesa and Morito.--The Death of a Disciple.--O’er a Withered Moor.--The Garden.--The Life of a Fool.--The Villa of the Black Crane.--Cogwheels.

- 3 Strange Tales. Trans. Glen Anderson. New York: One Peace Books, 2012. ISBN 9781935548126

Rashomon.--A Christian Death.--Agni.--In a Grove. [sic]

- The Best Japanese Short Stories: Works by 14 Modern Masters: Kawabata, Akutagawa and More. Trans. Lane Dunlop. Tokyo: Tuttle Publishing, 2020. ISBN 9784805317297

The Garden.

- Murder in the Age of Enlightenment: Essential Stories. Trans. Bryan Karetnyk. London: Pushkin Press, 2020. ISBN 9781782275558

The Spider's Thread.--In a Grove.--Hell Screen.--Murder in the Age of Enlightenment.--The General.--Madonna in Black.--Cogwheels.

- In Dreams: The Very Short Stories of Ryūnosuke Akutagawa. Trans. Ryan Choi. London: Paper + Ink, 2023. ISBN 9781911475569

Old Age.--In Dreams.--The Heron and the Mandarin Duck.--A Certain Socialist.--Sentences and Words.--Duck Hunting.--A Case of Two Fakes.--A Game of Tag.--Merchant Virgin Mary.--Jun'ichirō Tanizaki.--Pagoda Trees.--Frogs.--Kimono.--Snow.--Eastern Autumn.--Swamps I & II.--Kanzan and Jittoku.--Frosty Night.--Collecting Books.--River Fish Market--Dialogue with Hiroshi.--Tiger Stories.--A Moral Point.--Kachikachi Mountain.--Sennin.--Senjo.--Birthing Hut.--Masks.--As Food.--Hardship.--Strong Gifted Man, Weak Gifted Man.--The Women I Like in Romance Novels.--Flowers of the Sal Tree.--Garden Verdure.--On a Sunny Spring Day, Walking Idly Alone.--The Parrot: Notes on the Great Earthquake.--On Applause.--Memories from the Red Gate.--Yokosuka Scenes.--In the City (or Tokyo 1916).--Spring Nights.--Notes on Delirium.--Twenty Remarks on China.--Selected Notes from Kugenuma.--Ten Thorns.--Record of Eyes and Ears.--Nagasaki.--Karuizawa.--Hack Writer: A Play.--Tiger Stories: A Play)
