= Uji Dainagon Monogatari (disambiguation) =

Uji Dainagon Monogatari is a collection of stories by Minamoto no Takakuni

Uji Dainagon Monogatari may also refer to the following story or stories:

- Konjaku Monogatarishū
- Uji Shūi Monogatari
