= Toba-e =

Japanese art style

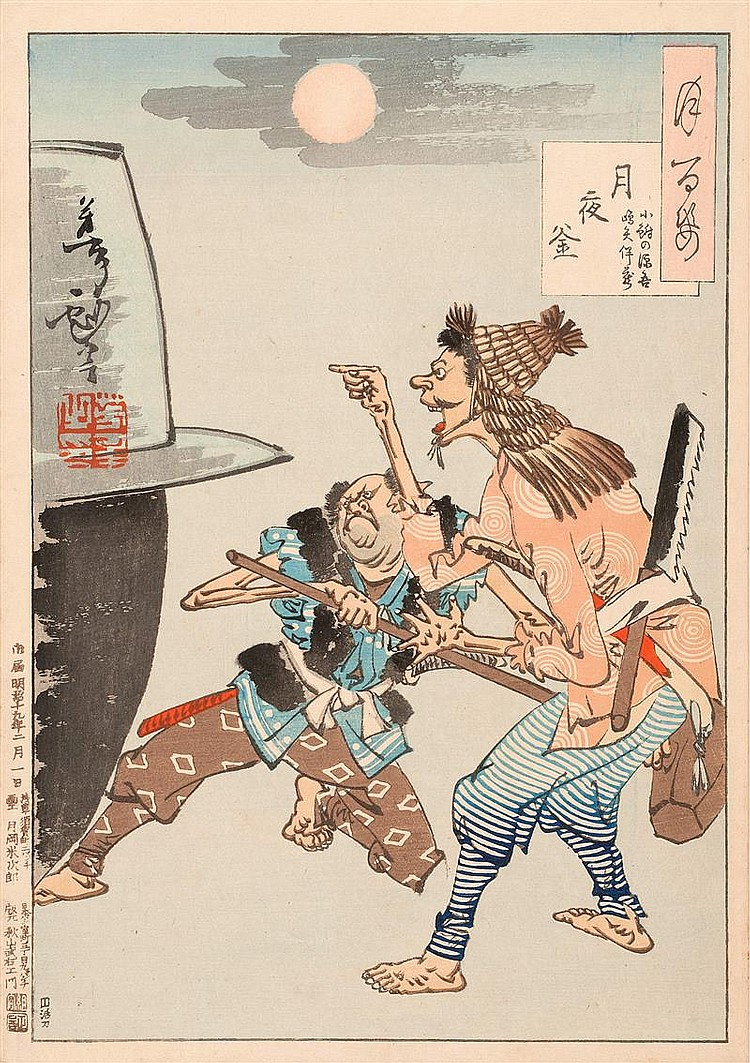
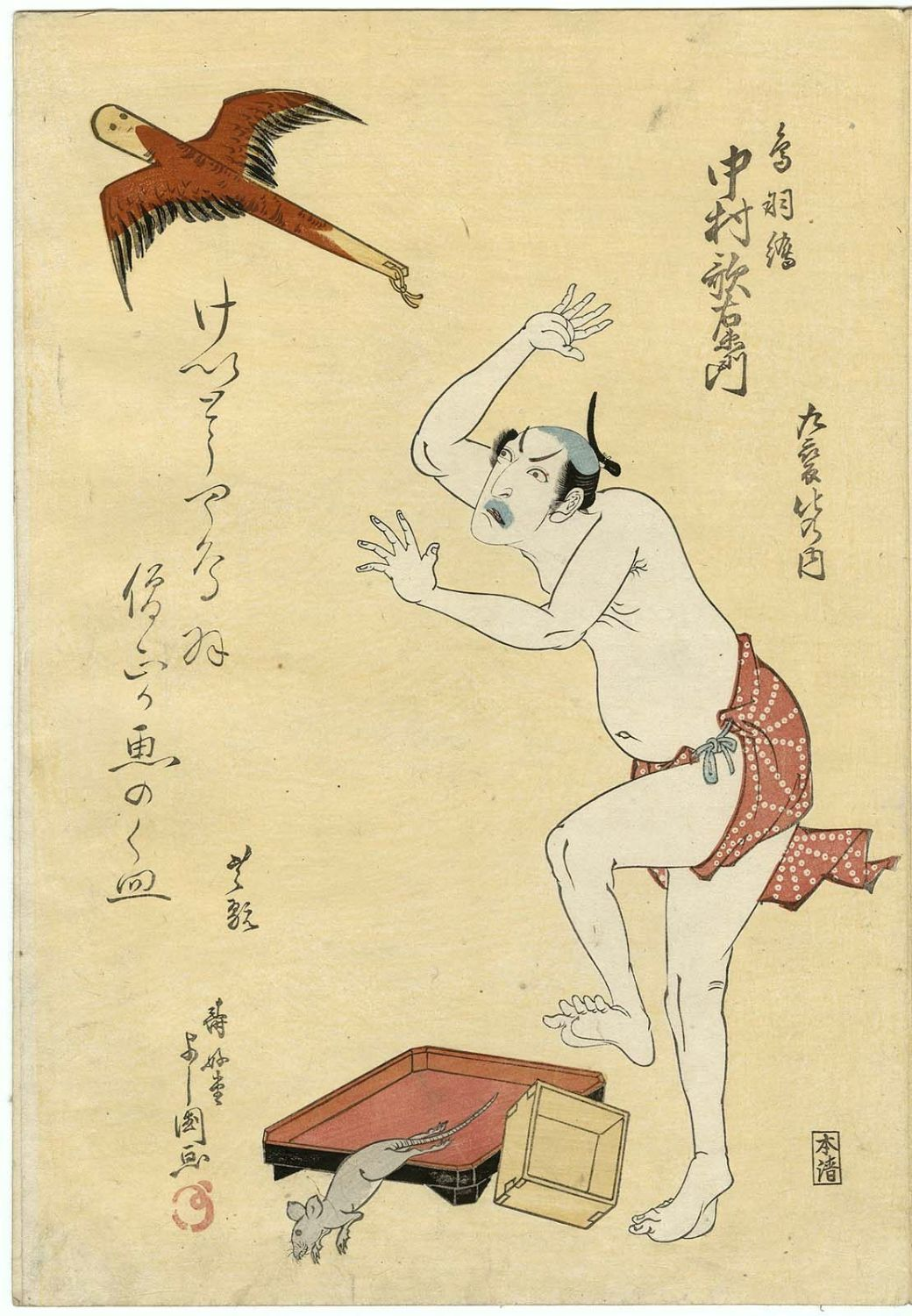
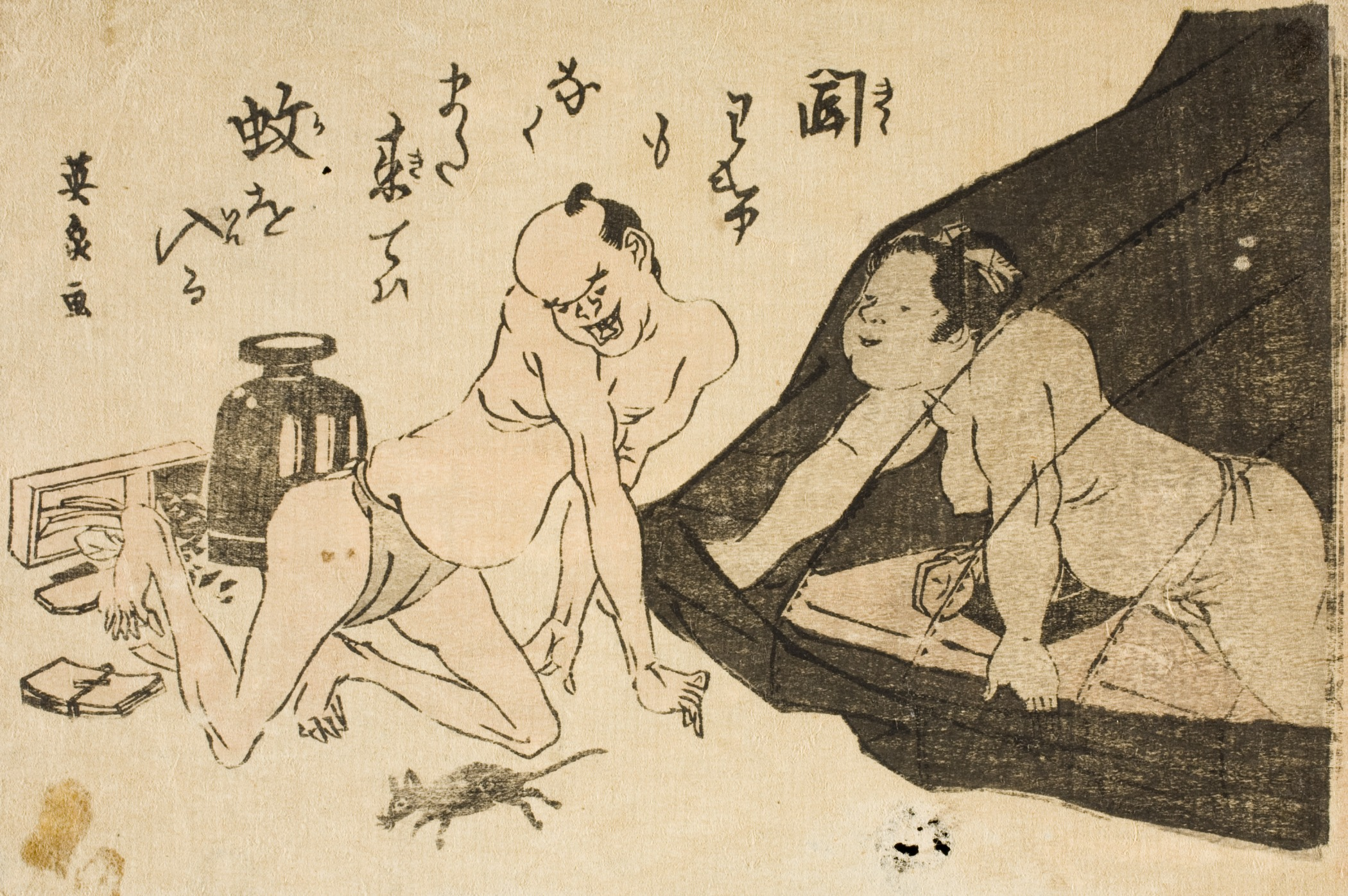
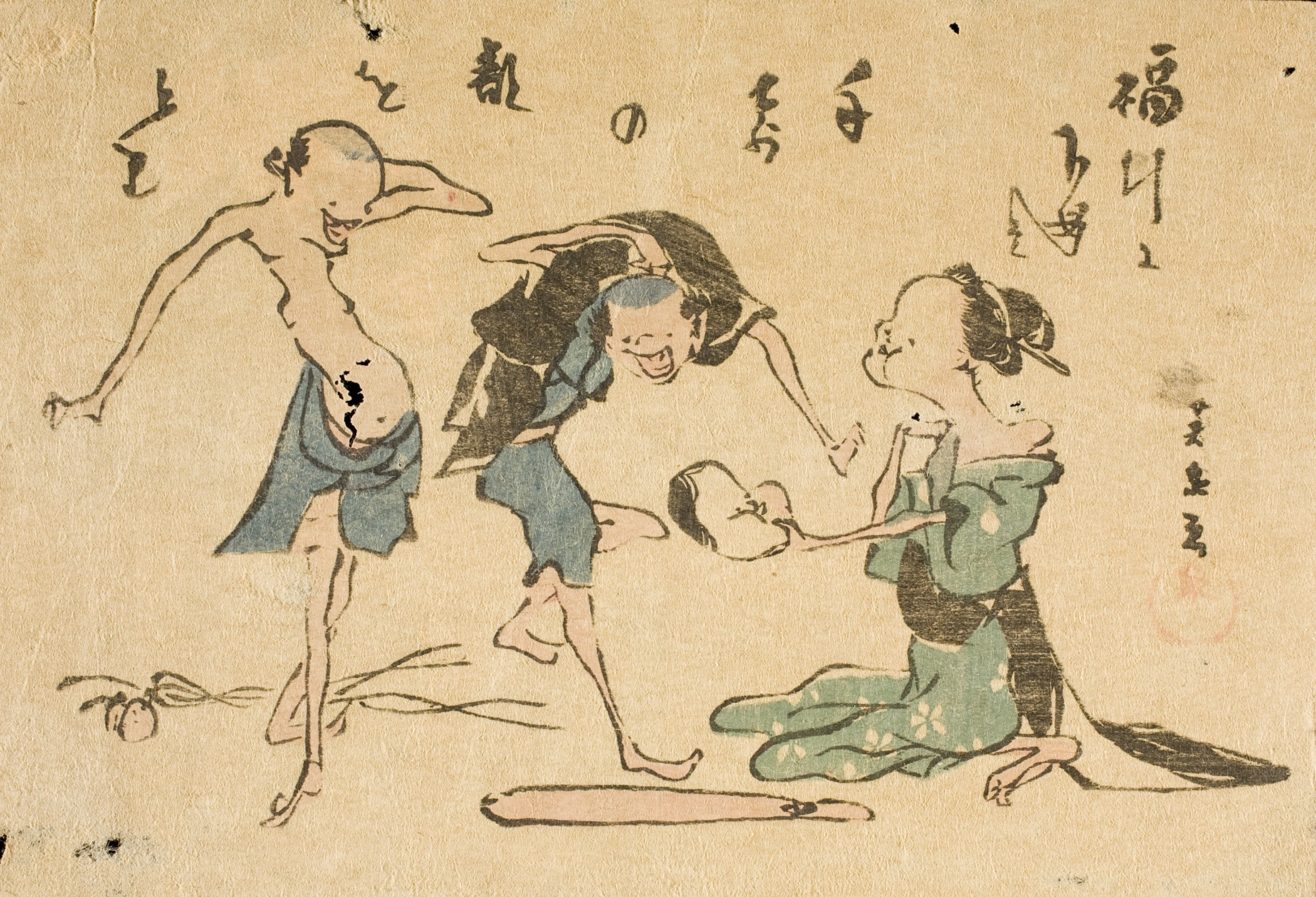
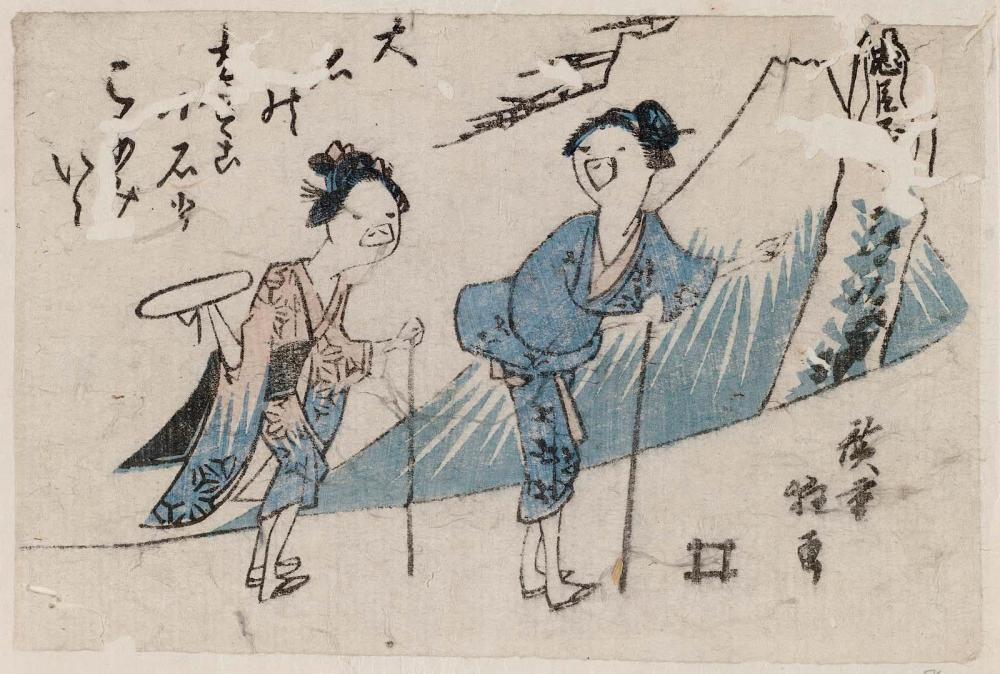
- Clockwise from top left: Tsukiyo no Kama by Tsukioka Yoshitoshi (1886); An excerpt from Kokonobake no uchi by Toyokawa Yoshikuni (1825); Okame under mosquito netting by Keisai Eisen (c. 1810); Fukubiki subject by Keisai Eisen (c. 1810); Act VIII, from the series The Storehouse of Loyal Retainers by Utagawa Hiroshige I (1835)
- Years active: c. 1704–1912
- Location: Japan, China
- Major figures: Katsushika Hokusai
- Influences: Chōjū-jinbutsu-giga, Otoko-e

Toba-e (Japanese: 鳥羽絵, Hepburn: tobae) is a style of Japanese painting based on works from the 12th century that are attributed to Toba Sōjō. These “Toba-style” images were caricatures sometimes involving animals performing human tasks. Toba-e style images gained popularity as a commercial medium in mid-eighteenth century Edo. Though their popularity did not stay strong, Toba-e images have left a lasting impact through today, particularly in manga.

== Style ==
Toba-e style paintings, as were popular in the Edo period, are marked by their comedy over just their visual content. The images should be cheerful and relaxed, but yet humorous. A sense of sarcasm is understood. Color is used light and conservatively. The focus of the image is on the simplicity and precision of the brushwork forming outlines. Strokes for the outlines and details are all applied with very crisp edges, but the shapes those outlines take are extremely playful and organic.

== History ==
=== Toba Sōjō ===
Toba-e is given its name because it is stylistically based on works which have been attributed to a priest from the 12th century, Toba Sōjō. The most prominent of these works is the Chōjū-jinbutsu-giga, or "Scroll of Frolicking Animals and People". Historical accounts and written attributions pin Toba Sōjō as the painter of these works, but there is much speculation as to whether or not the works in question were actually by him. Nonetheless, the style takes after him in name.

=== Chōjū-jinbutsu-giga ===
Much of the style of toba-e is based on the Chōjū-jinbutsu-giga. This is series of four long scrolls, intended to be read from right to left. The first, and most popular, depicts animals behaving in human ways in a very satirical manner. This work is considered to be the first manga, and is said to be the inspiration for the right to left reading of modern manga. The scroll appears to move through time as well as space as it is viewed, creating a synoptic narrative, or iji-dozu, which means “different time, same illustration.” The animals use bows and fishing poles, ride mules, engage in commerce, participate in Buddhist practices, and more. The intent of the images is debated and left a mystery, but they have a sense of whimsy and fun to them, as we would now still expect from caricature.

Visually, Chōjū-jinbutsu-giga takes off of otoko-e, known as the “masculine style” of painting, as opposed to onna-e, the feminine, which was practiced by the imperial courts. Images in these styles utilize heavy outlines, a strong sense of gesture, a focus on creating drama and in depicting the interactions between subjects, as well as a focus on individualizing characters from each other, as was not done in other styles. The lines are painted very crisply with no evidence of any sketching beforehand for planning. The strokes on the first scroll are very fluid and playful. They help carry a whimsical and carefree tone to match that of the light-hearted and satirical subject matter. All the while, recognition of form and a consistent level of naturalism, though cartoonish, is not sacrificed as it often is as a cost for emotion and character. Animation still today bases some visual styles off of descending from the Chōjū-jinbutsu-giga because of how effective the line-work is.

=== Toba-e in Edo ===
Through the 18th century in Edo, Toba-e images became very popular. Earlier collections of prints being bound together to be sold opened the door for the creation of a comic-style book. Toba-e was created using accordion-style books to present a large amount of image in a compact and manageable format. This allowed painters to create longer narratives than before in a reproducible size. This is in contrast to earlier books of pictures, which were nothing more than an assembly of random or pre-existing prints with no narrative, or a weak one added after the fact. These continuous narratives would bleed into other mediums, such as panel comics, and still continue even though Toba-e would die out. These narratives maintained many traits from Toba Sōjō’s earlier works. They generally maintained the right to left viewing style, but also included very little or no text. These books also maintained much of the visual style of Toba-e. The used strong outlines to represent the forms, very fluid strokes, and maintained the same playfulness but attention to drama. In terms of subject matter, Toba-e did diverge greatly from the works that were attributed to Toba. These books were sold in the entertainment districts, and as such were chosen to depict subjects that would be appealing to the people who would visit there, such as an image of a kabuki star or of city folk, rather than the far out quirkiness depicted in Chōjū-jinbutsu-giga.

=== Katsushika Hokusai’s manga ===
Katsushika Hokusai earned himself a notable career as a woodblock printmaker, both in Japan and throughout the world. He took medium to an all new level and brought it to such a wide audience because of his interest in, and ability to adapt to, western art styles. Even today people with no background in the arts may still be able to recognize his famous The Great Wave off Kanagawa, from the Thirty-six views of Mount Fuji series. However, though not as commonly recognized for it, he was also very instrumental in the birth of manga and in spreading the styles of Toba-e. His note as a woodblock artist brought great attention to his work when he released his manga in 1814. "Manga" was essentially Hokusai’s made-up word for Toba-e style art. Hokusai, in his manga, focused primarily on the technical aspects of the style rather than on building a narrative. The collection was mainly a clip art collection of all sorts of different types of images that could be used as reference material. The manga was a huge success anyway. Hokusai’s fame brought attention to the lesser known, but very interesting, style and helped spread it throughout the world. Hokusai’s manga was reprinted in the west and also sparked influence in China and elsewhere. The fact that he coined the term "manga" may lead some to believe Hokusai was the founder of manga in general, but this was just not the case. He did, however, help greatly in spreading it.

=== Spread of influence to China ===
Japan overturning its isolationist policies not only allowed it to be influenced by foreign powers, but allowed it to influence others as well. The poet and painter Feng Zikai studied for a time in Japan where he was introduced to many of their different styles of art. He was influenced by Japanese artists who were influenced by the West’s more painterly styles of art, such as Takehisa Yumeji, but more importantly he was exposed to the works of Hokusai and his manga. These inspired Zikai to work in a much looser and more playful and whimsical style like Toba-e and the western inspired artworks, and also inspired him to work with some comics as well. Zikai called his images “manhua,” an offshoot of the word “manga.” Manhua was defined as doodles and sketches that are done impulsively and without planning. This sense of spontaneity has been a key element in Toba-style painting since the seemingly perfect, though unplanned, strokes of Toba’s Chōjū-jinbutsu-giga. Feng Zikai transferred away from the lighter subjects that were more common place for toba-e and its descendants to face the grim realities of the world war that was raging. This was one of early manga’s first plunges into very dark subject matter, which would become near common place in contemporary comics. In the 1940s, Zikai made the transition into comics with multiple panels. This transition would be very important for manga and comics to become what we now see them as today.

Liao Bingxiong incorporated an interesting mix of the newer incarnations of Toba-e like styles and the traditional imagery of the original Chōjū-jinbutsu-giga scrolls. In his series titled “The Cat Kingdom” he used anthropomorphized versions of animals playing the roles of humans in his dark and deeply political multi-panel comics. Bingxiong used his comics as political cartoons to point out corruption and other such flaws in the government. Political cartoons were outlawed in China, so he could not publish his works and needed to exhibit them as works of art in a gallery so people could see them. He used the animal figures to create a sense of chaos and upheaval somewhat similar to the joyful frolicking in Chōjū-jinbutsu-giga’s sense of animal vitality. Ultimately Bingxiong was forced to stop creating art for over 20 years during the cultural revolution, despite his attempt at going through loopholes.

== Effect on modern manga ==
The style of Toba-e has gone through many incarnations on its way to influencing modern manga, but still many of the key original elements remain present. From the Chōjū-jinbutsu-giga, the use of anthropomorphized animals and creatures is still ever present. It is not a hard and fast rule, but a sense of communication and mutual understanding with animals or creatures seems commonplace. Anthropomorphizing is also extremely commonplace in American animation as a possible extension. This also plays into a Toba-e sense of whimsy and lightness. Modern anime and manga can be very dark, but the Superflat ideal of kawaii, or cute, plays right into a sort of scene like the frolicking animals. The whimsical world of toba-e has been taken to an extreme, almost unrelatable, level in modern manga. A sense of, and focus on, motion has remained as well. Toba-e captured some dramatic images of animals in motion and exerting force, and the same drive for dynamism can be seen in some modern manga, such as the dramatic depictions of travel through Neo-Tokyo in Akira.
