= Shigisan Engi Emaki =

Emakimono painted in the second half of the 12th century

- 信貴山縁起絵巻 (Japanese)
- Detail of the "flying granary" scene
- Artist: Unknown
- Completion date: 12th century CE; (Late Heian period)
- Medium: Emakimono; Paint and ink on paper handscroll
- Movement: Yamato-e
- Subject: Legends of Mount Shigi
- Dimensions: 31.7 cm × 878.27 cm (12.48 in × 345.78 in); 31.82 cm × 1,275.85 cm (12.53 in × 502.30 in); 31.7 cm × 1,417.43 cm (12.48 in × 558.04 in)
- Designation: National Treasure
- Location: Nara National Museum, Nara
- Owner: Chōgosonshi-ji

The Shigisan Engi Emaki (信貴山縁起絵巻; lit. "Legend of Mount Shigi Emaki") is an emakimono or emaki (painted narrative handscroll) made in the second half of the 12th century CE, during the Heian period of Japanese history (794–1185). It is an illuminated manuscript detailing miracles attributed to the monk Myōren, who lived on Mount Shigi near Nara in Japan in the latter part of the 9th century.

The tales are composed in the genre of engi, a narrative that chronicles the founding of a Buddhist or Shinto establishment. In the case of the Shigisan Engi Emaki, the establishment is Chōgosonshi-ji, where Myōren used to live. The pictorial style of the work, known as otoko-e, or "men's pictures", is characterized by active movement, outdoor scenes and a certain feeling of lack of restraint. Otoko-e is part of a broader style of Japanese painting called Yamato-e. The work is a prime example of both Heian period scroll painting and Yamato-e, as most of the early scroll and Yamato-e paintings are now lost.

== Background ==
=== Emakimono arts ===
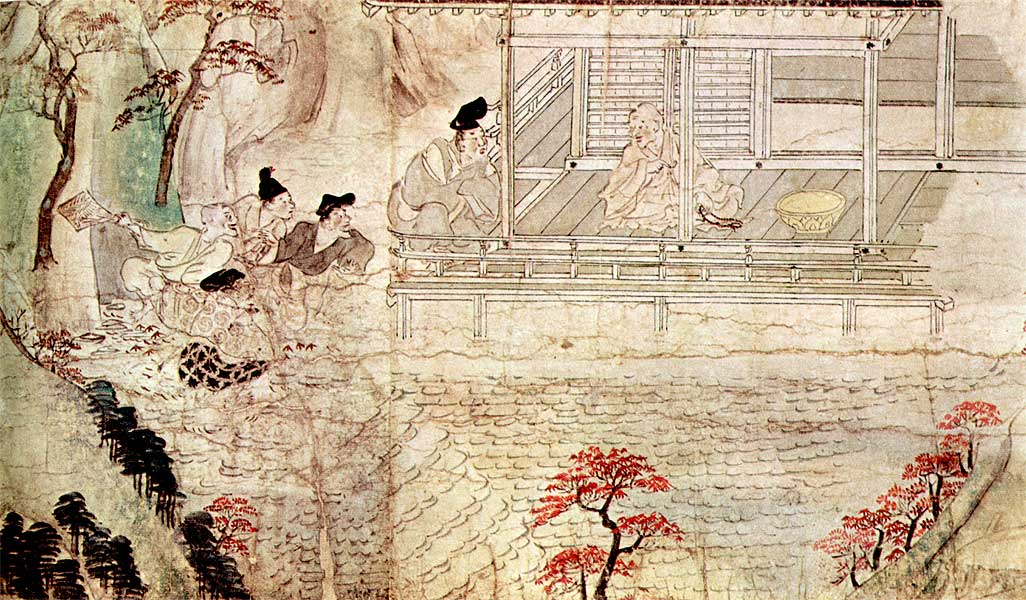
Detail of the first scroll: a rich farmer implores Myōren's forgiveness.

Originating in Japan in the sixth or seventh century through trade with the Chinese Empire, emakimono art spread widely among the aristocracy in the Heian period. An emakimono consists of one or more long scrolls of paper narrating a story through Yamato-e texts and paintings. The reader discovers the story by progressively unrolling the scroll with one hand while rewinding it with the other hand, from right to left (according to the then horizontal writing direction of Japanese script), so that only a portion of text or image of about 60 cm (24 in) is visible.

The narrative assumes a series of scenes, the rhythm, composition and transitions of which are entirely the artist's sensitivity and technique. The themes of the stories were very varied: illustrations of novels, historical chronicles, religious texts, biographies of famous people, humorous or fantastic anecdotes, etc.

=== The work and its historical sources ===
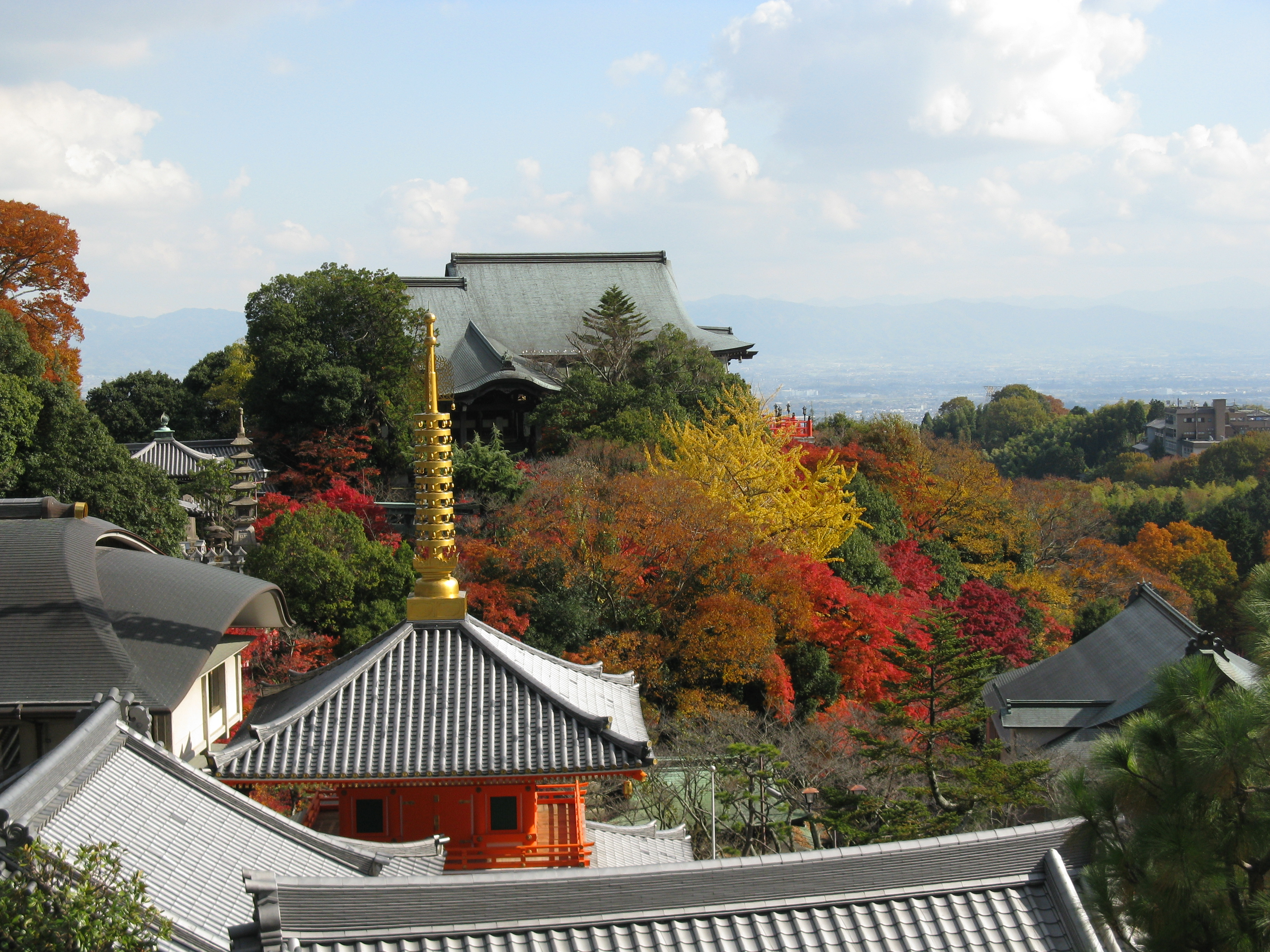
The Chōgosonshi-ji temple on Mount Shigi

The scrolls of the Shigisan Engi Emaki, three in number, each narrate a miraculous story about the life of Myōren, (Note: Myōren (命蓮).) a Buddhist monk who lived at the end of the 9th century in the Chōgosonshi-ji temple on Mount Shigi (Shigi-san) in the province of Yamato, and was dedicated to the deity Bishamon-ten (Vaiśravaṇa).

Nara Prefecture (in red) corresponding to the ancient Yamato Province, where Chōgosonshi-ji temple and Mount Shigi are located

The term "engi" in the title designates a Japanese literary style that transcribes chronicles and legends on the foundation of Buddhist temples or Shinto shrines, as well as, by extension, the miracles associated with them. Along with the biographies of high-ranking monks (kōsō-den (Note: Kōsō-den (高僧伝, Biographies of high-ranking monks).) or eden (Note: Eden (絵伝, Biography of a monk or a temple).)), this is the main genre of emakimono with a religious subject; the genre was produced in large numbers during the Kamakura period (1185–1333), mainly for proselytizing or didactic purposes.

The Shigisan Engi Emaki is nowadays the oldest example of emakimono with religious themes that devote a large part of their content to the representation of everyday life and folklore, testifying to an unprecedented interest in painting for children and popular legends. Such interest, however, already existed among the Japanese nobility from at least the end of the 11th century, as evidenced by the literature of the Imperial Court. Indeed, several ancient collections of popular tales, including the Konjaku Monogatarishū, the Kohon Setsuwa Shū and the Uji Shūi Monogatari, tell three anecdotes, reminiscent of the subject of the Shigisan Engi Emaki, about a hermit-monk from the Nara period. The surviving texts of the second and third scrolls are very similar to the Kohon Setsuwa Shū, suggesting that the author relied mainly on that collection. The mixture of popular and religious themes in the Shigisan Engi Emaki and many later emakimono, which give them an authentic and romanticised look, thus ties in with these earlier works.

The life of Myōren (who died circa 937–941) is also recorded in a short autobiography dated 937 and several subsequent historical chronicles. These sources relate that he lived for a dozen years on Mount Shigi where a small chapel dedicated to Bishamon-ten was installed. Several companions joined him, giving Chōgosonshi-ji growing importance. According to other fictionalised chronicles, Myōren would have been instructed in a dream during a retreat at the Hōryū-ji temple to go to Mount Shigi to settle there, with a purple cloud to guide him.

== Description ==
=== Overview ===
The Shigisan Engi Emaki is made up of three paper scrolls in a horizontal format. On each scroll, calligraphic texts accompany illustrations that have been painted, by hand, using watercolour-like techniques associated with the application of strokes in India ink. The scrolls measure respectively: 31.7 cm (12.5 in) high by 878.27 cm (345.78 in) long; 31.82 cm (12.53 in) high by 1,275.85 cm (502.30 in) long; and 31.7 cm (12.5 in) high by 1,417.43 cm (558.04 in) long. Each scroll is assembled from several sheets of paper of similar lengths - approximately 60 cm (24 in) long - glued one after the other: 16 sheets for the first scroll, 24 for the second and 26 for the third.

=== First scroll ===
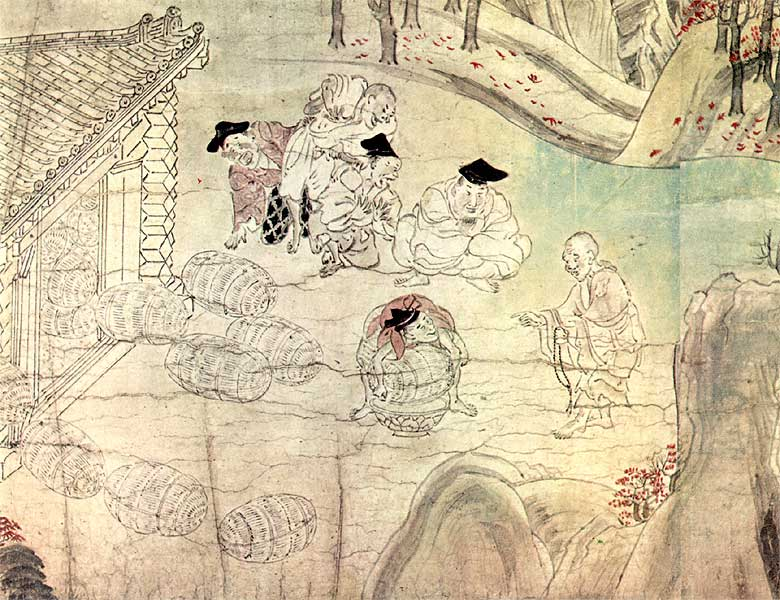
Detail from the first scroll: Myōren orders his visitors to put a bag of rice in his bowl

The first scroll, commonly titled "The Flying Granary", (Note: Yamazaki Chōja no maki (山崎長者の巻, lit., "the rich man Yamazaki").) consists of a single long painted section, the calligraphic text having disappeared. It narrates the anecdote known as the "flying granary". Myōren used to send his bowl by air every day to the nearby village, where a wealthy farmer filled it with rice. One day, however, the farmer refused to take on this task and Myōren punished him by causing his entire rice barn to fly away. The scroll thus opens with a scene showing the amazement and dismay of the villagers running after the flying granary. Several landscape scenes follow, in which travellers are astonished at this flying granary while the rich farmer on horseback and four of his people pursue their property.

Myōren's home then suddenly appears in a mountain landscape. The monk is seated on his terrace, facing his visitors who then appear. The farmer bows to the monk and it is understood that he begs Myōren to give him back his rice. After a new short mountain landscape, we discover Myōren and his visitors in front of the rice granary. A servant places a bag of rice in Myōren's bowl, obviously on the order of the latter who explicitly points a finger at the bowl. The rest of the bags then begin to fly away. There follows, as for the flying granary, a long scene of landscapes flown over by sacks of rice, to the village where the little people are busy with their daily occupations - the women cook or collect fruit, a child and an old man are reading. Finally, a short landscape concludes the painting and the first scroll.

=== Second scroll ===
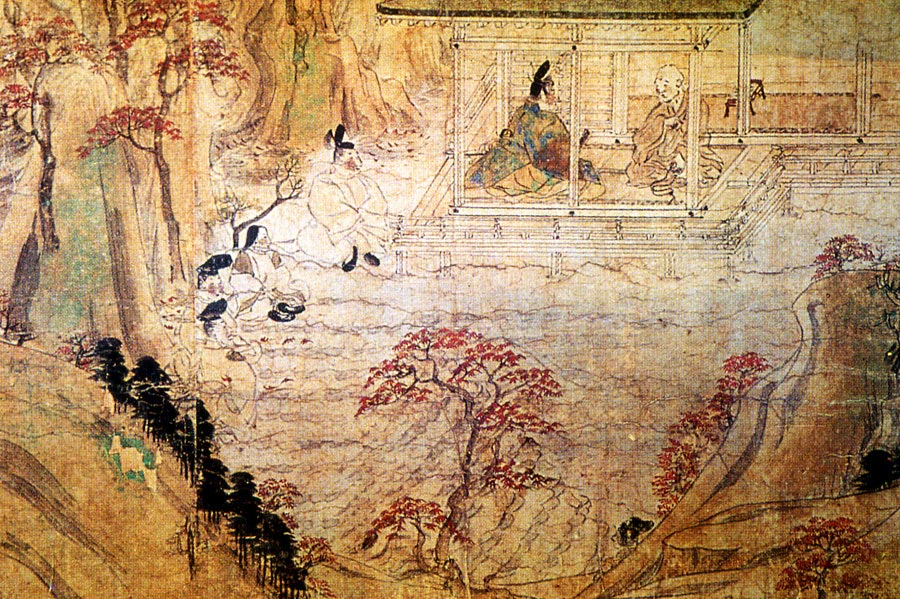
Detail from the second scroll: The Imperial Messenger asks Myōren for help in healing the Emperor

The anecdote narrated in the second scroll, "The Exorcism of the Emperor of the Engi Era", (Note: Enki Kaji no maki (延喜加持の巻, lit., "scroll of the exorcism of the Engi era").) relates to the miraculous healing of the reigning Emperor Daigo by the prayers of Myōren. The scroll consists of two portions of calligraphic text and two long painted sections. After the introductory text, the first painting opens at the great door of the original imperial palace of Heian-kyō (present-day Kyoto) in front of which an imperial delegation is preparing to leave, while priests arrive to pray for the ailing Emperor. Several sequences illustrate the delegation's journey through various landscapes, a village and mist. After finally arriving at Mount Shigi, the messenger of the delegation and Myōren are conversing, seated on a veranda, while the other travellers wait below. Following a scene of a new mountain landscape, the delegation is depicted returning to Seiryō-den, the Emperor's private quarters, apparently bringing back a message from Myōren. The palace wall completes the first painting.

The second calligraphed section reveals that Myōren, despite insistent requests of His Imperial Majesty, has refused to go in person to the palace, and has promised to heal the Emperor from his home. The second painting opens with a view of the Emperor seated in his quarters. Outside, a long landscape shows Ken-no-Gohō (Note: Ken no gohō, or Tsurugi no gohō (剣の護法).) flying over fields and farms to the palace, the wheel of dharma rolling in front of him. The deity, sent by Bishamon-ten, has the mission of answering the prayers of the Buddhist monk by healing the Emperor. Following a short landscape, the painting shows the imperial delegation again on their way through plains, mists and mountains. The messenger thanks Myōren in person, and then the painting ends with a landscape lost in the mist.

=== Third scroll ===
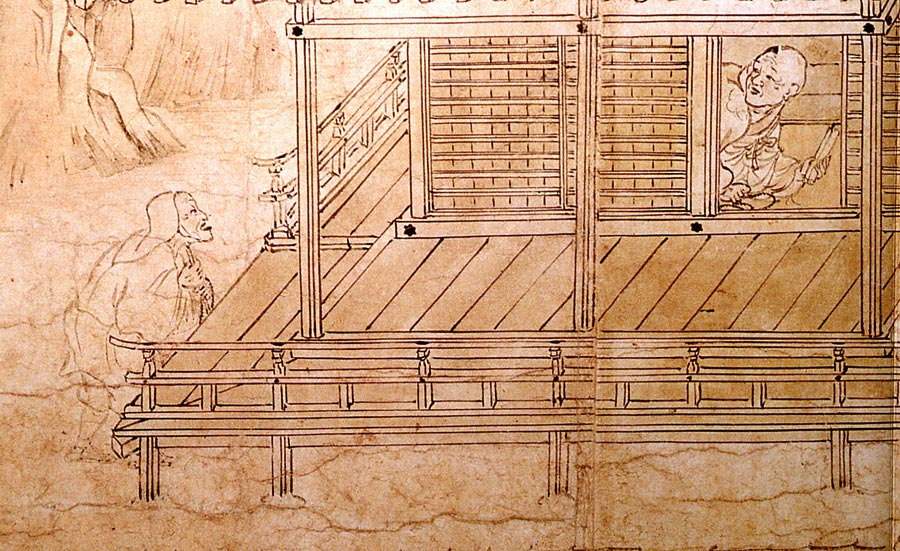
Detail from the third scroll: Myōren's sister arrives after many adventures with her brother

The third scroll, "The Story of the Nun", (Note: The Amagimi no maki (尼公の巻, Amagimi scroll, or "scroll of the nun").) recounts the adventures of a nun, Myōren's older sister, in search of her brother whom she has not seen for twenty years. It consists of two calligraphed sections and two painted sections. After the introductory calligraphed text, the first painting opens with a mountain landscape in which an old nun and two men walk. Then the nun, who has arrived at a village, is shown sitting under the porch of a chapel while the villagers bring her food. There follows a new scene of landscape and mist, then the nun, having passed a small Dōsojin shrine, asks an old peasant for information about her brother. Behind them are the farm and three busy women, one in the garden and two washing the laundry. We then discover the nun sitting on the doorstep of the farm, chatting with a young woman who spins wool. We also see through the windows a woman and children scrutinizing the travellers with curiosity, as well as a man rebuffing two dogs barking outside. A new landscape again shows the nun travelling, fallow deer indicating that she is in the Nara region. Then the nun, following her arrival at the Tōdai-ji temple, is painted praying in front of the Daibutsu (大仏, "Giant Buddha") monumental statue. The nun is shown several times (a technique of representation of time passing) in the scene at the foot of the monumental statue, praying, sleeping or meditating. The temple disappears in the mist, then a landscape scene follows, completing the painting.

The second calligraphed section relates that the Tōdai-ji Daibutsu appeared in the nun's dreams to guide her to her brother. In the second painting, Myōren looks outward as if someone has called him; in front of him stands his sister. There follows a landscape where a purple cloud appears in the air, an omen indicating that the nun was guided to Mount Shigi by this cloud. The nun then settles down with her brother, and the last scene paints the two protagonists in different activities, such as praying, reading sutras or preparing religious rituals. A mountain landscape closes the painting, in which the roof of the flying granary of the first scroll can be seen.

== Dating, author and sponsor ==
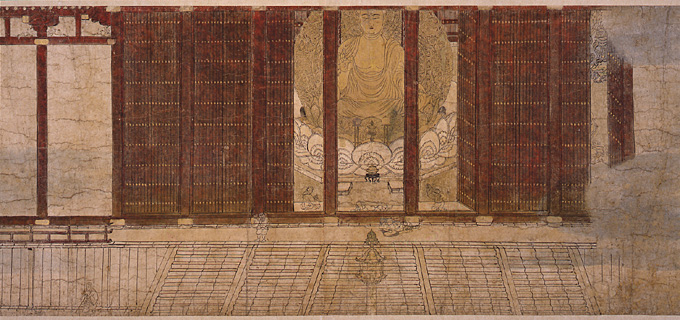
Detail of the third scroll: the Great Buddha of Tōdai-ji where Myōren's sister retired

The exact date of creation of the scrolls is not known. Art historians commonly date the work as being from the middle or second half of the 12th century (the end of the Heian period), probably between 1157 and 1180, but without certainty. This estimate is based on the dating of architectural details reproduced in the work. Thus, the Kikki, the personal diary of Yoshida Tsunefusa, (Note: Kikki (吉記), the personal diary of Yoshida Tsunefusa (1142 – 1200).) an aristocrat of the Imperial Court, evokes arrangements around the palace, reproduced in the second scroll, which are subsequent to the beginning of the Hōgen era (1156–1159), hence the date of manufacture of the scrolls was probably after the beginning of this era. As for 1180, this was the year when the original statue of the Great Buddha of Tōdai-ji, which is depicted in the third scroll, was destroyed by fire, indicating that the work is probably prior to that date. The style of calligraphy is also close to those in vogue during the last quarter of the 12th century. Although that date remains approximate, it nevertheless makes the Shigisan Engi Emaki one of the oldest emakimono preserved today.

The author and the sponsor are not better known. The making of emakimono is a highly collaborative process that requires the participation of calligraphers for text, painters gathered in the workshop, editors, and possibly the participation of publishers or a sponsor for the choice of texts and paintings to be executed. The work has traditionally been attributed to Kakuyū, also known as Toba Sōjō, monk and painter. However, that allocation has been refuted, as Kakuyū died in 1140 while the scrolls are consensually dated by art historians as being from the second half of the 12th century This traditional attribution made him the son of Minamoto no Takakuni, credited with compiling the Konjaku Monogatarishū, a collection that itself contains a similar anecdote about the monk's pilgrimage through the provinces of Japan until a mysterious cloud guided him to Mount Shigi.

Contemporary studies of the paintings emphasize the precise rendering of the clothes of nobles and private quarters of the Imperial Palace, indicating that the painter was a familiar of the court, for example a professional painter belonging to an edokoro. The burlesque, even caricatural aspect of the faces in the scrolls also recall the humorous sketches that have been found in the margins of religious paintings produced by the workshops of Buddhist temples; Buddhist imagery is similarly very precise, suggesting that the author of the scrolls was also familiar with the religious world. Thus, the work can be attributed to a professional court painter as well as to a Buddhist painter, without it being possible to distinguish between the two worlds. This difficulty of attribution is not surprising insofar as, at the end of the Heian period, the activity of court and temple painters largely overlapped.

As for the sponsor, also unknown, a working hypothesis considers him to have belonged to the learned circles of the court, for example the Fujiwara clan or the Emperor Go-Shirakawa, because of the diversity of the motifs represented. The goal of the sponsor was perhaps to promote the worship of Bishamon-ten as well as the monastic lifestyle of the Nara era as practiced by Myōren, amid religious controversy between several rival Buddhist schools towards the end of the 12th century.

== Style and composition ==
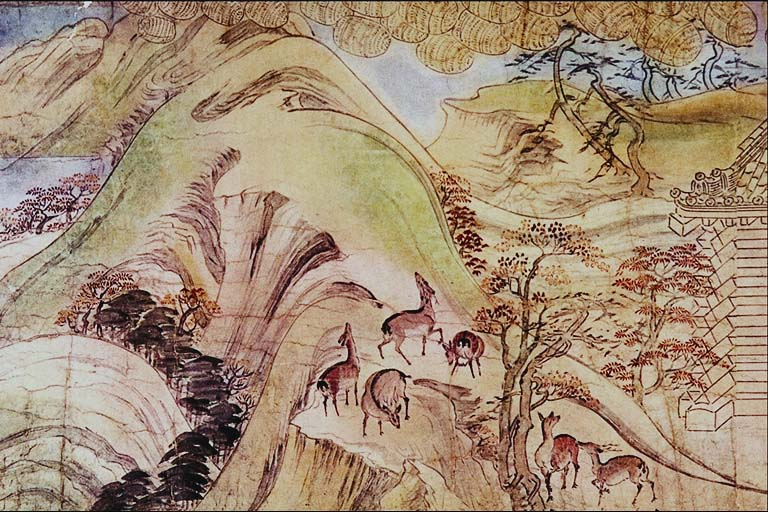
Detail of the first scroll: transitional landscape, with the sacks of rice returning to the village at the top

The pictorial style of the Shigisan Engi Emaki falls within the Yamato-e movement, which predominated in Japanese painting in the Heian and Kamakura periods (1185–1333). More precisely, the style is part of a sub-genre of Yamato-e called otoko-e (lit. "painting of a man"). The otoko-e style is characterised by the depiction of the life of the people outside the palace and the staging of historical and epic events, as opposed to the intimate and romanticised emakimono about life in the palace. Emakimono of the otoko-e genre emphasize dynamic images rather than text. Thus, the composition of the Shigisan Engi Emaki (known as continuous composition) is based on long paintings, in which several scenes follow one another without a clear break, creating an impression of dynamism. The transitions between scenes are cleverly integrated into the composition, and allow variation of the rhythm, in particular thanks to close-ups, or the insertion of calm landscapes and mists.

Often, the painters of emakimono are led to distort the time span of the story, due to constraints linked to the format of the scrolls, which impose the progressive discovery of paintings limited in height. First, the painter can spread a single narrative moment over several scenes of the scroll, to create suspense, an epic story or simply the passing of time. For example, the arrival of Ken-no-Gohō at the palace in the second scroll of the Shigisan Engi Emaki is represented by a long painting providing an effect of suspense as to the rest of the story, while the long landscapes flown over by the flying granary in the first scroll suggest both distance and passing time, highlighting Myōren's incredible supernatural power. Secondly, the painter can condense several stages of the story into a single scene, allowing the action to be imaged with great economy of means. In particular, the painter of the Shigisan Engi Emaki twice used a characteristic process of Yamato-e, by representing, in a single scene, the same character several times (a technique known as hanpuku byōsha), or at different moments (the iji-dōzu technique), to suggest the passing of time: the nun is represented several times in the scene at Tōdai-ji (third scroll), praying or sleeping, and then in the final scene showing her new life with Myōren.

The artistic dimension of the scrolls also follows the canons of the otoko-e style. Thus, the paintings are dynamic and fluid, relying mainly on the curves and ink lines which really constitute the heart of the composition. The ink drawing confers great freedom on the artists, allowing a naturalistic style in opposition to the very stylised paintings of the court such as the Genji Monogatari Emaki. The colour thus gives way at the line, being affixed only in a discreet tone and revealing the bare paper. The painters mainly used vegetable pigments, the opacity of which varies according to the amount of water used for their dilution. As the paper absorbs these colours with water, gradation effects are created naturally, giving a realistic rendering and facilitating transitions between scenes, for example by creating a light mist in which the landscape is lost, or gradual blurring of the colour giving way to bare paper. The same process is used with India ink to obtain different levels of grey.

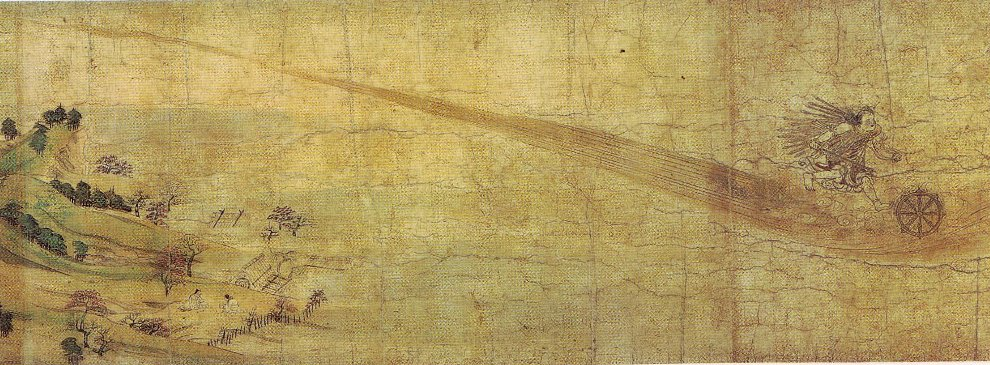
Ken-no-Gohō, sent by Bishamon-ten, en route to heal Emperor Daigo

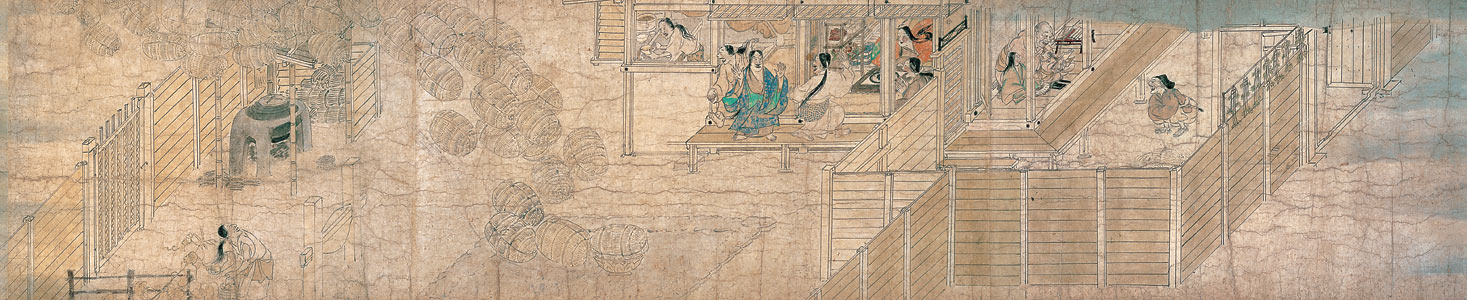
The villagers rejoice when the bags of rice return to the village by air

Depth is typically rendered in emakimono by diagonal lines which create axonometry while guiding the reader's eye from scene to scene. This process is particularly well illustrated by the flight of the sacks of rice in the first scroll, or the arrival, from the sky, of Ken-no-Gohō in the second scroll, materialised by a long diagonal line from the bottom corner to right to the top left corner of the scroll. To create perspective, the painter also uses bird formations that gradually become smaller and smaller, a process originating in Chinese painting. This Chinese influence is also found in the rugged mountain landscapes, executed with great mastery through soft lines and ink strokes for the reliefs.

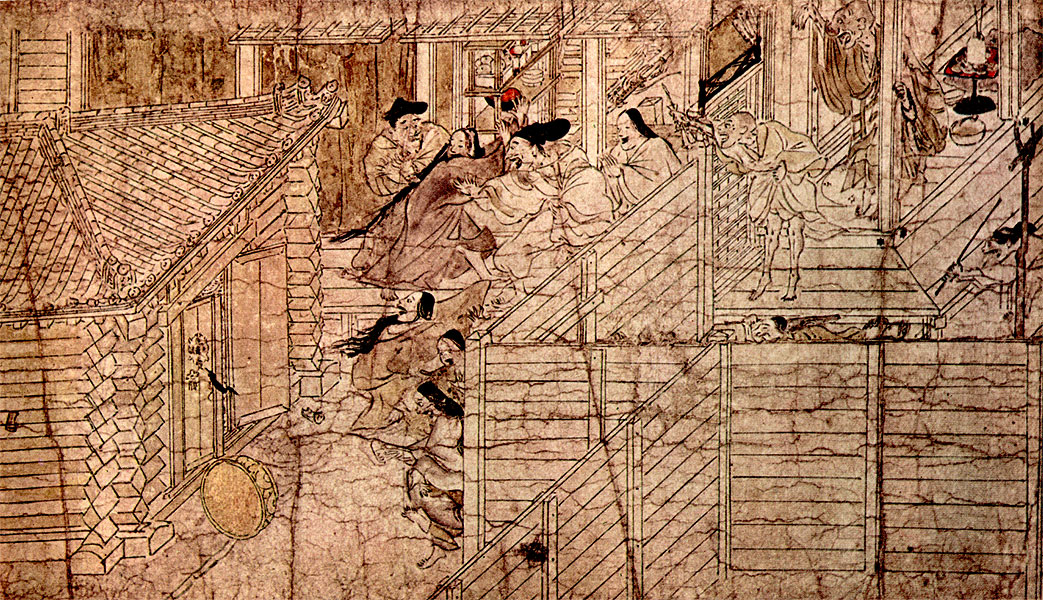
The villagers are stunned when Myōren's bowl miraculously comes to life

The work is characterised by the painter's desire to represent the daily life of the people: peasants, merchants, monks, women ... This bias confers a lively and authentic, almost documentary aspect to the scrolls, and gives the painter every opportunity to deviate from the text to imagine adventures or new details, for example the solitary peregrinations of the nun (third scroll) or the rural life painted in the landscapes during the flight of the bags of rice (first scroll). The faces, painted in a human and popular, almost caricatural way, express a wide range of emotions: confusion, agitation, excitement alternate with each other. These expressive faces, whose details are underlined in ink, contrast with the stylised faces of the court paintings, and foreshadow the more realistic iconography that will dominate in emakimono during the following century.

The paintings also show a good knowledge of Buddhist imagery, in particular the rendering of the Great Buddha of Tōdai-ji and the deity Ken-no-Gehō. Historians identify the latter as one of the twenty-eight messengers of Bishamon-ten, the main deity of Chōgosonshi-ji. The wheel that precedes it evokes that of Dharma (Dharmachakra), an ancient and powerful Buddhist symbol, here underlining the power of this deity.

As for the calligraphies, they are very parsimonious, having only a function of summary presentation of the story, except for the first scroll where the text has completely disappeared.

== Historiographical value ==
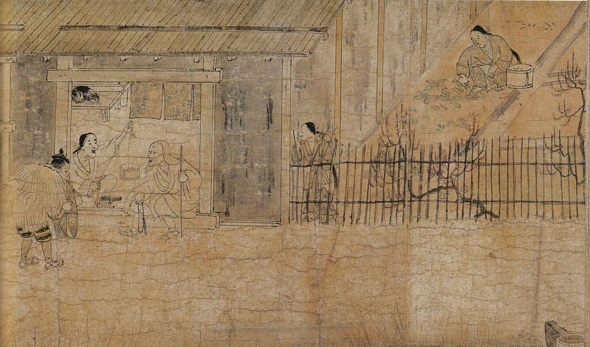
Rural life scene in the third scroll

In view of their themes and narration, the scrolls have a certain historiographical value with respect to the life of their time. So, for example, the genre scenes of the first and third scrolls show the chores of the common people, for example the peasant women drawing water from the well, washing the laundry, spinning or even breastfeeding their children. The scrolls also facilitate observation of the work or hobbies of common people, such as cooking, gardening, reading, and watching over children.

Studies by historians have focused in particular on habitat, tools (oven, press), rural work, customs and social practices (such as hospitality), clothing, food and travel.

On the other hand, the scrolls present many details of the religious and secular architecture of the time (the imperial palace, the temples and the cottages of the peasants); in the first scroll, the habitat of the rich farmer offers many details of the thatched roof, the hearth, the kitchen, the palisades ... The third scroll even presents a rare glimpse of the original Daibutsu statue at Tōdai-ji, which burned down in 1180. The subsequent reconstruction of the hall was limited to nine bays instead of the original eleven.

The monk's journeys also occupy a large place in the narration, and include depictions of the historical Kisoji (木曽路) trade route, which connected Mino with Matsumotodaira, then finally Kyoto, as well as the small shrines and state-maintained inns along the route. Some details are still unclear today, such as the exact meaning of the marks drawn on some farms.

== Provenance ==
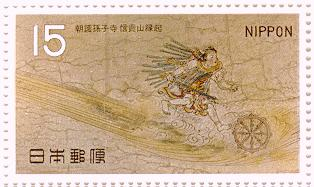
Japanese postage stamp from 1968 showing detail of the second scroll

The Shigisan Engi Emaki has belonged to the Chōgosonshi-ji temple since its inception, but is stored in the Nara National Museum. The work was designated as a National Treasure of Japan on 9 June 1951, and it was on that occasion that its current title, Shigisan Engi Emaki, was adopted, although the scrolls do not mention that title. From the beginning of April to the end of May 2016, the Nara National Museum organized a special exhibition, during which all three painted scrolls, spread out over their entire length, were presented to the public for the first time.

The emakimono appears not to have survived in its original form, as suggested by the absence of text in the first scroll, perhaps due to alterations or old reassembling. Today, there is no consensus on the original form of the work; the existing hypotheses envisage the simple disappearance of the texts of the first scroll, the disappearance of a few painted scenes, or of an entire painting at the start of the first scroll, or even the reassembly of the sheets making up the scrolls in a different order. The pictorial pigments have also largely disappeared in various places. An engraving on the box in which the scrolls were kept indicates that a fourth scroll, the Taishigun no maki, (Note: Taishigun no maki (太子軍巻).) now disappeared, was stored there.

Several copies of the emakimono have been made, including one by Sumiyoshi Hiroyasu (Note: Sumiyoshi Hiroyasu (住吉広保), 1666–1750.) from 1701 which is kept at Chōgosonshi-ji.

== Contemporary study and appreciation ==
Today, the Shigisan Engi Emaki is considered by art historians to be one of the masterpieces of emakimono art. It has been the subject of dozens of academic articles, and in particular makes it possible to study the formation of the Yamato-e movement in the Heian period, very few earlier paintings having survived. It also illustrates the refinement of narrative painting at the end of the Heian period, foreshadowing the golden age of the emakimono during the Kamakura period that followed. Due to its dynamic and continuous storytelling, the Shigisan Engi Emaki is often cited to contextualize the influence of Japanese painting on modern manga, which is very popular in Japan. According to manga artist Seiki Hosokibara, the work should even be considered the very first manga in history, a title traditionally associated with the Chōjū jinbutsu giga, a view contested by journalist Kanta Ishida, author of the "Through the Eyes of an Otaku" column in the Yomiuri Shimbun newspaper, for whom the four Chōjū jinbutsu giga scrolls should be considered separate, self-contained works.

== See also ==
- List of National Treasures of Japan (paintings)
- National Treasure (Japan)
