= Yamato-e =

Japanese painting style

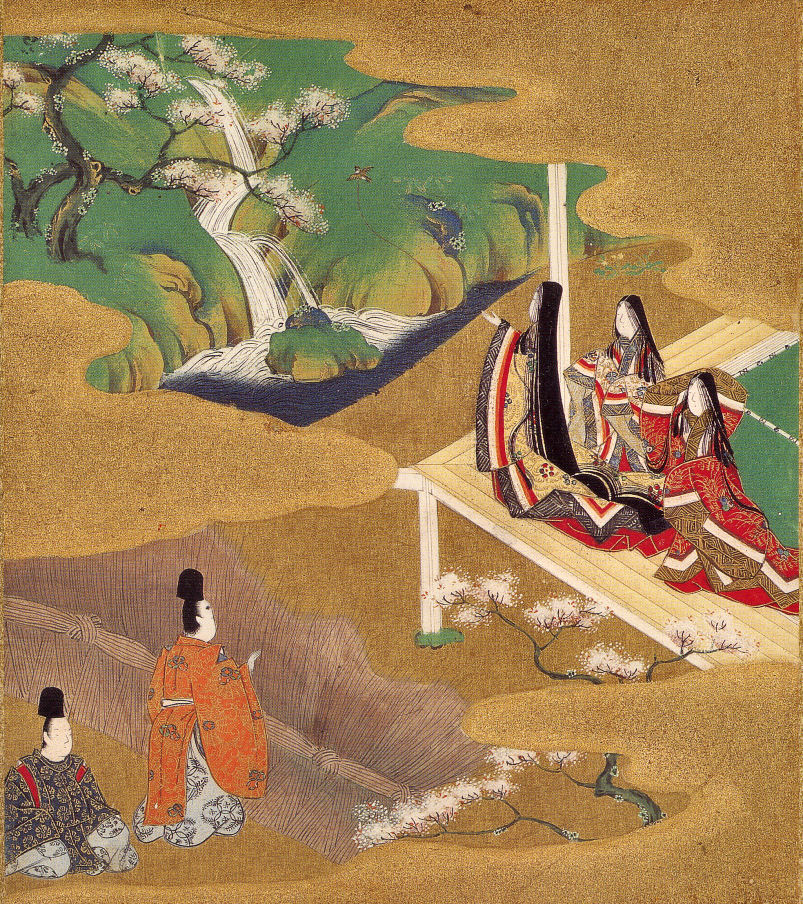
Scene from The Tale of Genji by Tosa Mitsuoki, from the 17th century Tosa school revival of the style

Yamato-e (大和絵) is a style of Japanese painting inspired by Tang dynasty paintings and fully developed by the late Heian period. It is considered the classical Japanese style. From the Muromachi period (15th century), the term yamato-e has been used to distinguish work from contemporary Chinese-style paintings kara-e (唐絵), which were inspired by Chinese Song and Yuan-era ink wash paintings.

Characteristic features of yamato-e include many small figures and careful depictions of details of buildings and other objects, the selection of only some elements of a scene to be fully depicted, the rest either being ignored or covered by a "floating cloud", an oblique view from above showing interiors of buildings as though through a cutaway roof, and very stylised depiction of landscape.

Yamato-e very often depict narrative stories, with or without accompanying text, but also show the beauty of nature, with famous places meisho-e (名所絵) or the four seasons shiki-e (四季絵). The pictures are often on scrolls that can be hung on a wall (kakemono), handscrolls (emakimono) that are read from right to left, or on a folding screen (byōbu) or panel (shōji). Although they received their name from the Yamato period, no yamato-e paintings from this period survive, nor from several centuries afterwards. Yamato-e pictures rather stand for a style and are not restricted to a particular period.

There was a revival of the yamato-e style in the 15th century by the Tosa school, including a return to narrative subjects, and although the rival Kanō school grew out of the alternative tradition of Chinese-style works, the style it developed from the late 16th century for large paintings decorating Japanese castles included some elements of the yamato-e style. In the 17th century, the simplified and stylised depiction of landscape backgrounds in yamato-e was revived as a style for large landscape works by the Rinpa school. Later the narrative element of yamato-e, the interest in the depiction of everyday life, and the choice of oblique and partial views in a composition heavily influenced the ukiyo-e style, as well as the nihonga.

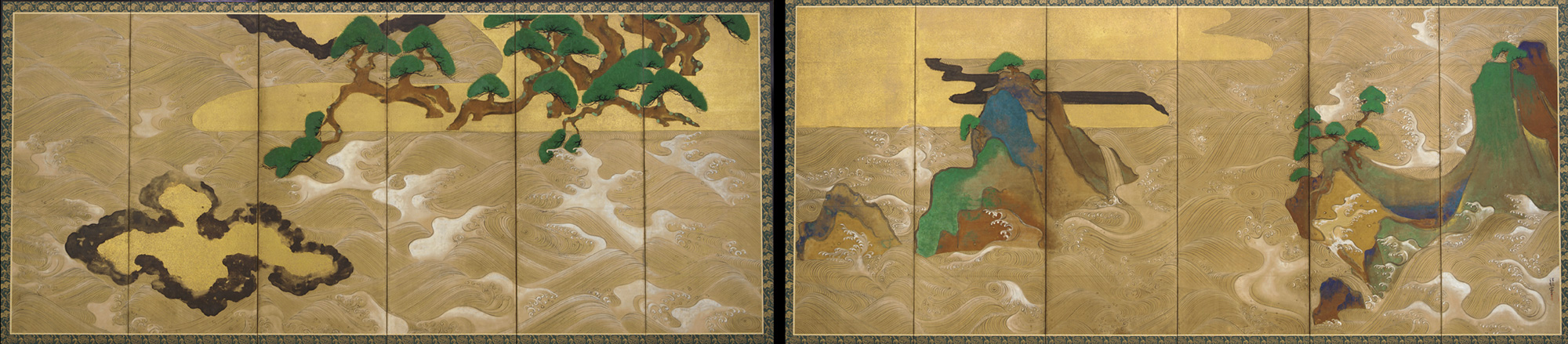
Rinpa school version of yamato-e landscape style on a pair of screens by Tawaraya Sōtatsu, 17th century

== History ==
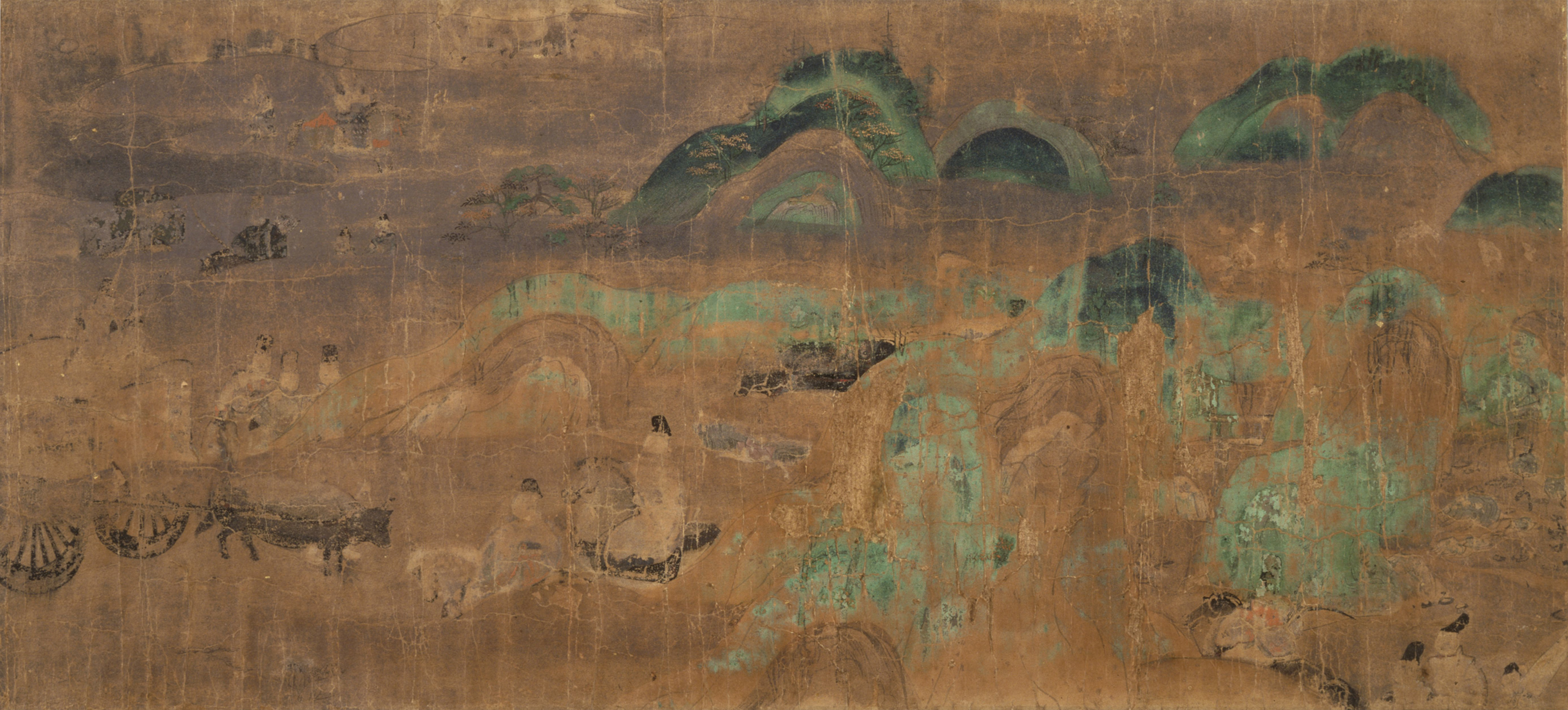
Scene from the Genji Monogatari Emaki Emaki, 12th century, Tokugawa Art Museum

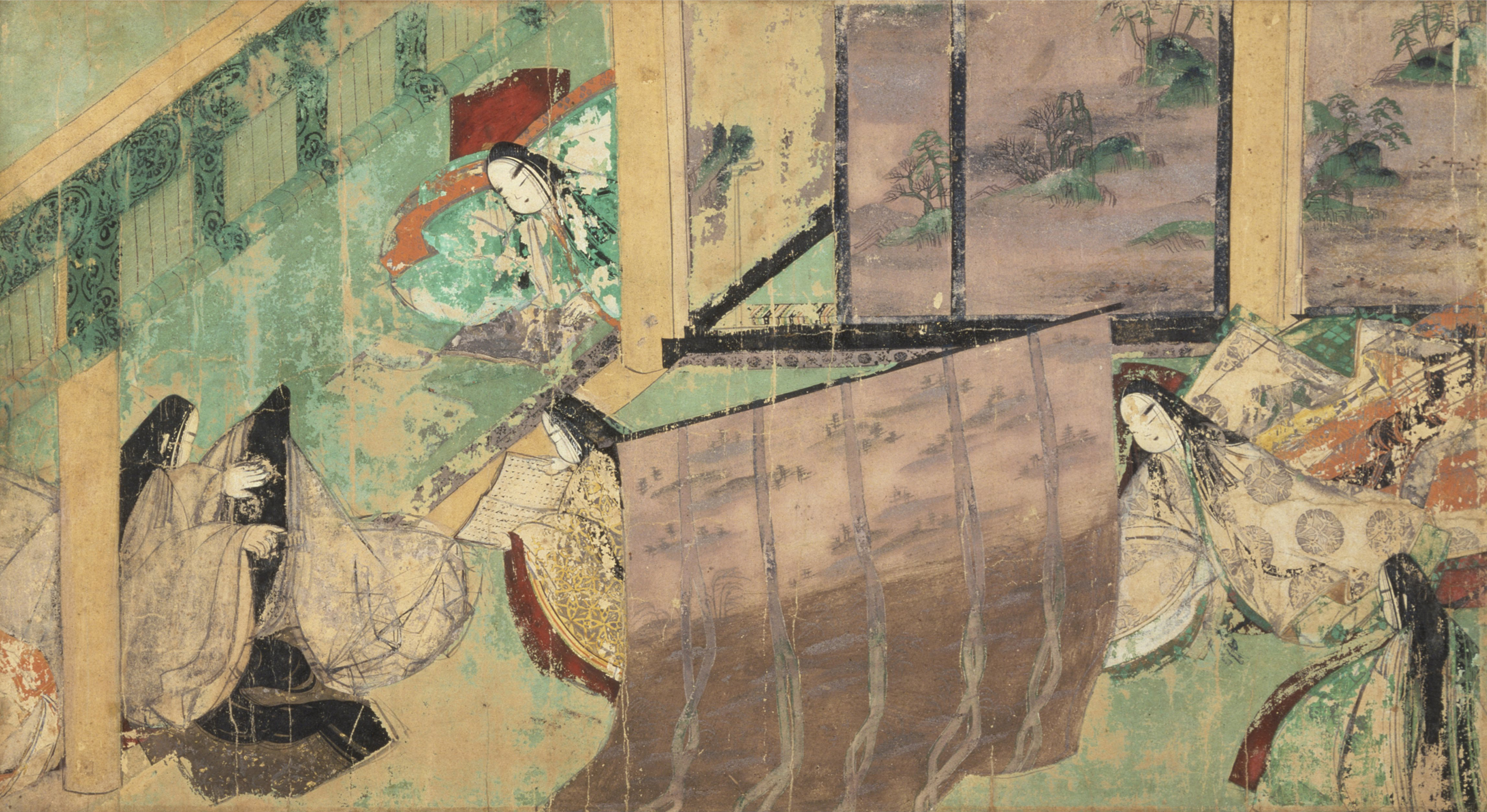
"Eastern House Chapter", another scene from the Genji Monogatari Emaki illustrated handscroll of The Tale of Genji

Shigisan-engi, the "flying storehouse" scene, 12th century

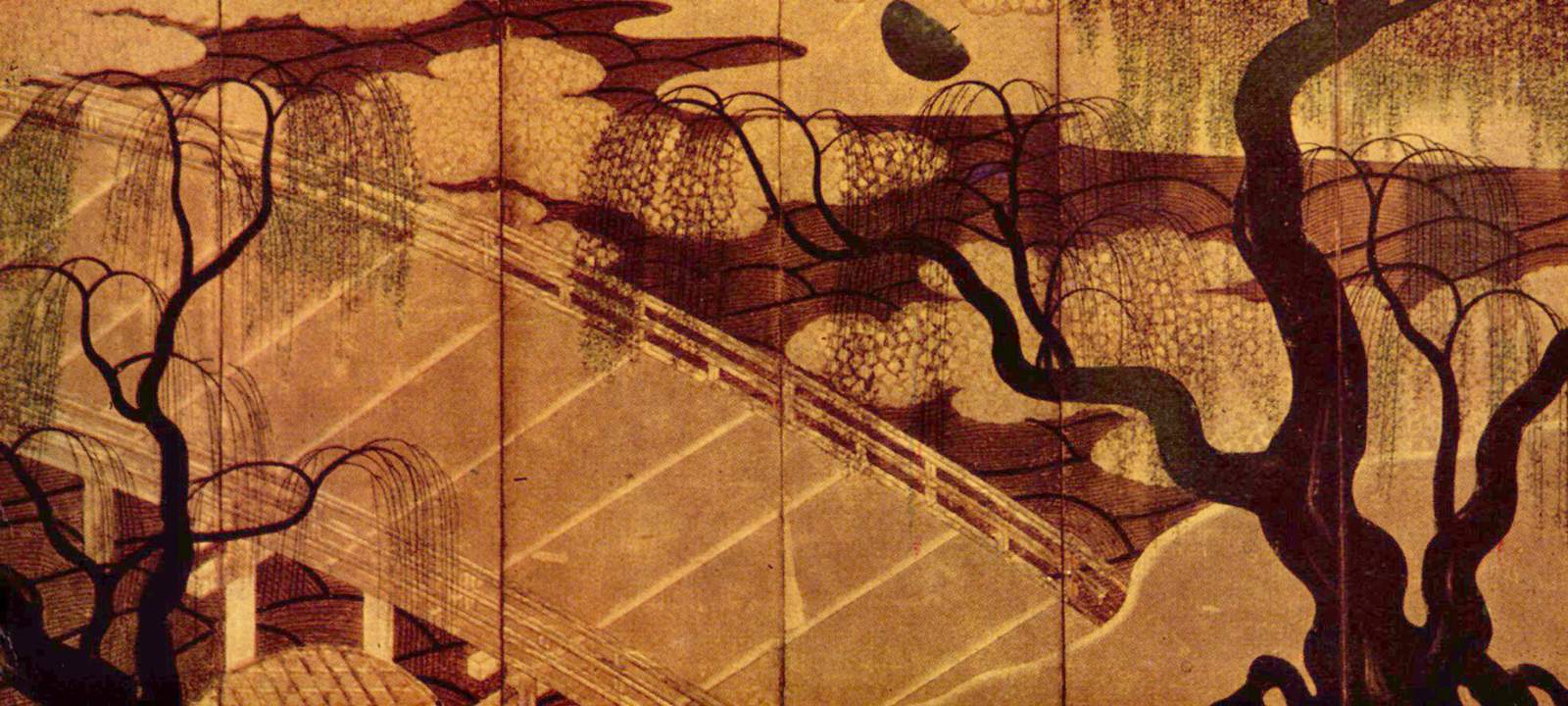
Uji Bridge Screen, an example of later yamato-e from the 17th century

The term yamato-e is found in Heian texts, although the precise range of works it covered then, and also in subsequent periods, is a much debated topic. There are also references showing a distinction within yamato-e between "women's painting" and "men's painting". This distinction is also much debated but the typical assumptions as to its meaning can be illustrated by works from each group discussed in the next two sections; both are famous masterpieces and National Treasures of Japan.

The range of works discussed below, all usually considered to be embraced by the term yamato-e, is considerable, but most are narrative handscrolls with many small figures. There were also many screens and works in other formats in the various styles, of which few traces remain. The yamato-e style is apparent in the landscape background of some of the Buddhist paintings which are the most numerous survivals of Heian painting.

=== Genji Monogatari Emaki ===
The oldest yamato-e works to survive are four famous 12th century handscrolls of parts of The Tale of Genji, three in the Tokugawa Art Museum in Nagoya, with another from the same set in the Gotoh Museum in Tokyo; together they are known as the Genji Monogatari Emaki. Only a small proportion, about 15%, of the original survives, assuming this was complete. The original scrolls would have totalled about 450 feet long, in 20 rolls which alternate text with images, containing over 100 paintings, with over 300 sections of calligraphy. The surviving scrolls consist of only 19 paintings, 65 sheets of text, and 9 pages of fragments.

The paintings show an already mature tradition that has developed a considerable way from its Chinese origins. Conventions include the angled view from above into roofless rooms, and very simplified facial details, allowing minimal expressiveness. The colours are fresh and bright, built up in a technique called tsukuri-e (作絵; "make-up") where a first outline is covered by several layers of pigment, with final lines added on top. Only one example survives from so early comparable to the painted fusuma screens shown at the rear in the interior scene illustrated. As female figures, mostly shown in a state of elegant lassitude, far outnumber the men, this is taken as an exemplar of "women's painting".

=== Legend of Mount Shigi ===
The Shigisan-engi or "Legend of Mount Shigi" tells the story of the 9th century Shingon monk Myoren, founder of the Chogosonshi-ji temple. Like contemporary Western hagiographies, the narrative contains miracles, including a famous episode of the "flying storehouse" (illustrated). The story takes place mostly among ordinary country people, and is shown as one continuous picture about 30 feet long, with the same characters recurring in different scenes which are connected by a continuous background. The images are done in a very different technique, with ink drawing lightly coloured by washes. Most figures are men, and when women are shown, as in another scene where the missing rice returns, they are shown in a very different way to the figures in the Genji Monogatari Emaki. Facial features are shown in far more detail than in the Genji Monogatari Emaki, and a wide range of expressions are expertly depicted. This is an example of one version of what "men's painting" is taken to refer to.

=== Other works ===
The Murasaki Shikibu Diary Emaki is a now-incomplete illustrated version of The Diary of Lady Murasaki, the author of The Tale of Genjii, today surviving in four sections, with images of court ceremonies.

An early military and political work is the Ban Dainagon Ekotoba (The Tale of Great Minister Ban), a late 12th century emakimono (handscroll painting) depicting the events of the Ōtenmon Conspiracy, an event of Japan's early Heian period. The painting, attributed to Tokiwa Mitsunaga, is over 20 m long and about 31.5 cm tall.

The Chōjū-jinbutsu-giga represents a very different style within yamato-e, with very lively pen drawings of men and anthropomorphic animals in a number of scenes.

Rather more examples survive from the following Kamakura period (1185–1333), including many showing scenes of life among the ordinary people, and also stories of wars from Japanese history. The Mōko Shūrai Ekotoba (Illustrated Account of the Mongol Invasion) are a pair of illustrated handscrolls from between 1275 and 1293. They were commissioned by the samurai Takezaki Suenaga in order to record his battlefield valour and deeds during the Mongol invasions of Japan.

From near the end of the first period of works in the style, the Yūki Kassen Ekotoba is a handscroll nearly 3 metres long, with a single wide battle scene after a text section, illustrating the suicide of Ashikaga Mochiuji after his rebellion in 1439.

== Notable artists ==
- Kose Kanaoka
- Tosa Mitsuoki
- Tosa Mitsunobu
- Awataguchi Takamitsu

== See also ==
- Emakimono
- Ink and wash painting
