= Chōjū-jinbutsu-giga =

Emakimono

- Animals wrestling on the first scroll of Chōjū-jinbutsu-giga
- Material: Paper and ink
- Created: 12th century and 13th century
- Discovered: Scrolls were known since creation
- Present location: Tokyo National Museum; Kyoto National Museum

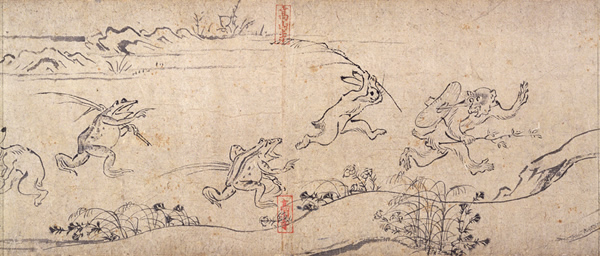
Panel from the first scroll, a monkey thief runs from animals with long sticks

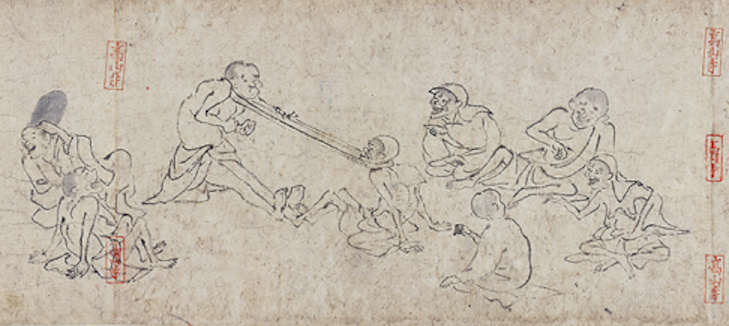
Panel from the 3rd scroll, picturing two people jokingly playing tug-a-war with their heads

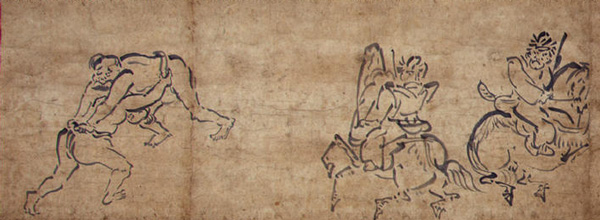
Fragment from the fourth scroll, a man gets defeated in a wrestling match. Separated from the original at some point. Miho Museum

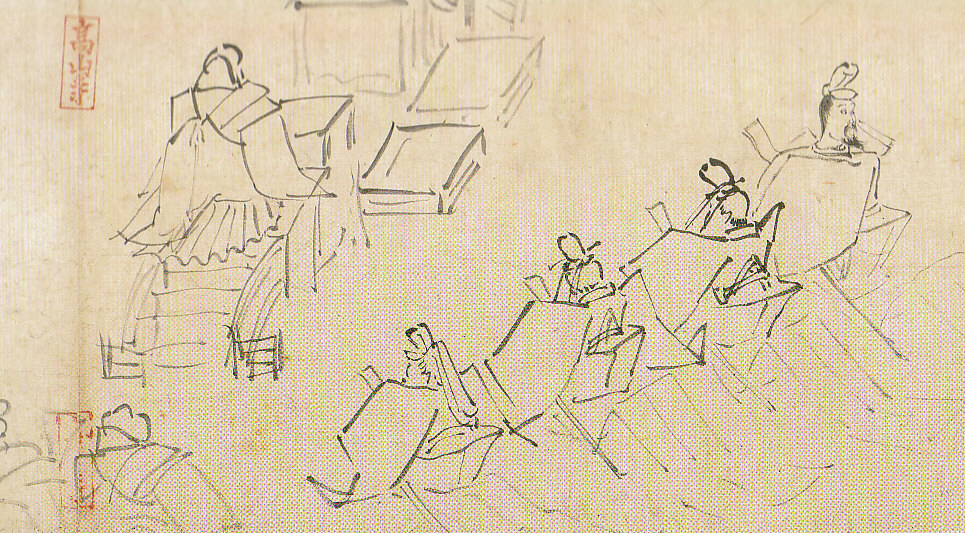
Panel from the fourth scroll, samurai listen to their leader speak carefully

Chōjū-jinbutsu-giga (鳥獣人物戯画; literally "Animal-person Caricatures"), commonly shortened to Chōjū-giga (鳥獣戯画; literally "Animal Caricatures"), is a famous set of four picture scrolls, or emakimono, belonging to Kōzan-ji temple in Kyoto, Japan. The Chōjū-giga scrolls are also referred to as Scrolls of Frolicking Animals and Scrolls of Frolicking Animals and Humans in English. Some think that Toba Sōjō created the scrolls; however, it seems clear from the style that more than one artist is involved. The right-to-left reading direction of Chōjū-jinbutsu-giga is traditional in East Asia, and is still common in Japan. Chōjū-jinbutsu-giga is also credited as the oldest work of manga. The scrolls are now entrusted to the Kyoto National Museum and Tokyo National Museum.

The scrolls are the earliest in a linear monochrome drawing style that was to continue in use in Japanese painting (as they are all done with the usual writing and painting brush, they count as painting).

As opened, the first scroll illustrates anthropomorphic rabbits and monkeys bathing and getting ready for a ceremony, a monkey thief runs from animals with sticks and knocks over a frog from the lively ceremony. Further on, the rabbits and monkeys are playing and wrestling while another group of animals participates in a funeral and a frog prays to Buddha as the scroll closes.

The scrolls were also adapted into several novels published by Geijutsuhiroba, the first book simply compiled the scrolls into one publication, now out of print. One of the books participated as part of the company's Fine Arts Log series as well as some were exclusive to certain exhibitions. Other companies like Misuzu Shobo and Shibundō also published books based on the Chōjū-jinbutsu-giga emakimono.

Although Chōjū-jinbutsu-giga is sometimes credited as the first manga, there have been some disputes with the Yomiuri Shimbun newspaper. Seiki Hosokibara pointed to the Shigisan-engi scrolls as the first manga, and Kanta Ishida explained that the scrolls should be treated as masterpieces in their own right.

== History ==
The Chōjū-jinbutsu-giga emakimono, belonging to the Kōzan-ji temple in Kyoto, Japan as an ancient cultural property, are usually thought to have been painted in the mid-12th century, whereas the third and fourth scrolls may well date from the 13th century.

The work belongs to the decline of the Fujiwara period, but it expresses in one of its best aspects the artistic spirit of their age. The artist is a delightful draughtsman. His pictures of animals disporting [themselves] in the garb of monks are alive with satirical fun. They are a true fruit of the native wit; they owe nothing to China beyond a vague debt to her older artistic tradition; and they bear witness to that reaction against the solemnities of Buddhist art which we have noticed.

— George Bailey Sansom, quoted from Japan, A Short Cultural History.

Most think Toba Sōjō created Chōjū-jinbutsu-giga, who created a painting a lot like Chōjū-jinbutsu-giga; however, it is hard to verify this claim. The drawings of Chōjū-jinbutsu-giga are making fun of Japanese priests in the creator's time period, characterising them as toads, rabbits and monkeys. Chōjū-jinbutsu-giga is read and rolled out from right to left which can still be seen in manga and Japanese books. Chōjū-jinbutsu-giga is credited as being the oldest work of manga in Japan, and is a national treasure as well as many Japanese animators believe it is also the origin of Japanese animated movies. In Chōjū-jinbutsu-giga the animals were drawn with very expressive faces and also sometimes used "speed lines", a technique used in manga til this day. Emakimono like Chōjū-jinbutsu-giga and many others barely were seen in the public until they made their way into popular culture, with many common people imitating the style. Emakimono emerged very popular in the city of Ōtsu, Shiga, and being dubbed Ōtsu-e after its popularity in the city around the 17th century. The first two scrolls are entrusted to the Tokyo National Museum, and the second two are entrusted to the Kyoto National Museum. The scrolls currently on display at Kōzan-ji are reproductions.

== Emakimono ==
The first scroll, which is considered the most famous, depicts various animals (frogs, rabbits and monkeys) frolicking as if they were human. There is no writing on any of the scrolls; they consist of pictures only. The first scroll is also the largest, with a length of 11 meters (36 ft) and 30 cm (1 ft) wide. As the first scroll is opened, rabbits and monkeys are bathing and swimming in a lake, moving on past the mountains, cliffs and trees are rabbits and frogs making bow and arrows. Further more, more rabbits and frogs are bringing pots and boxes to a (currently) unknown event. Frogs and rabbits pass by monks with their cattle (wild boar, sika deer) and a monkey runs away, supposedly stealing, and being chased by a rabbit with a long stick, further more a frog is lying on the floor who could have possibly been knocked over by the thief. Nearby, a celebration has started with two frogs dancing, and a group of animals having a conversation. Not too far from the celebration are animals wrestling and fighting and two monkeys holding a box. Far from the celebration are a group of animals at a funeral and a frog praying in front of a frog shaped Budai as the scroll closes.

== Gallery ==
Panel from the first scroll, depicting animals swimming and bathing for the upcoming ceremony.

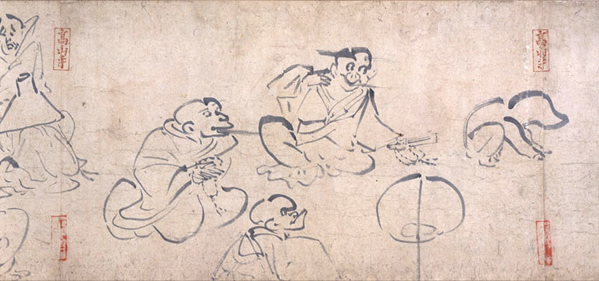
Panel from the fourth scroll, depicting monks sitting down and smoking their pipes.

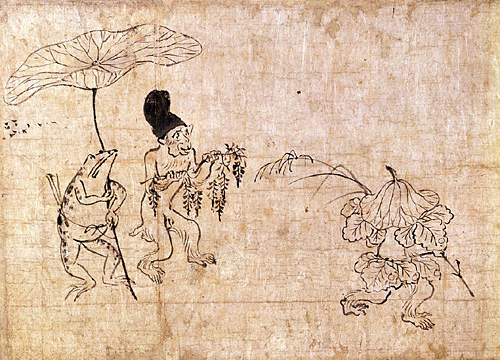
Fragment from the first scroll Detail, depicting a frog holding a lilypad over a monk's head. Tokyo National Museum

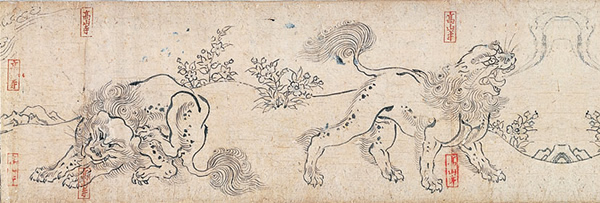
Panel from the second scroll, lions roar and scratching their backs.

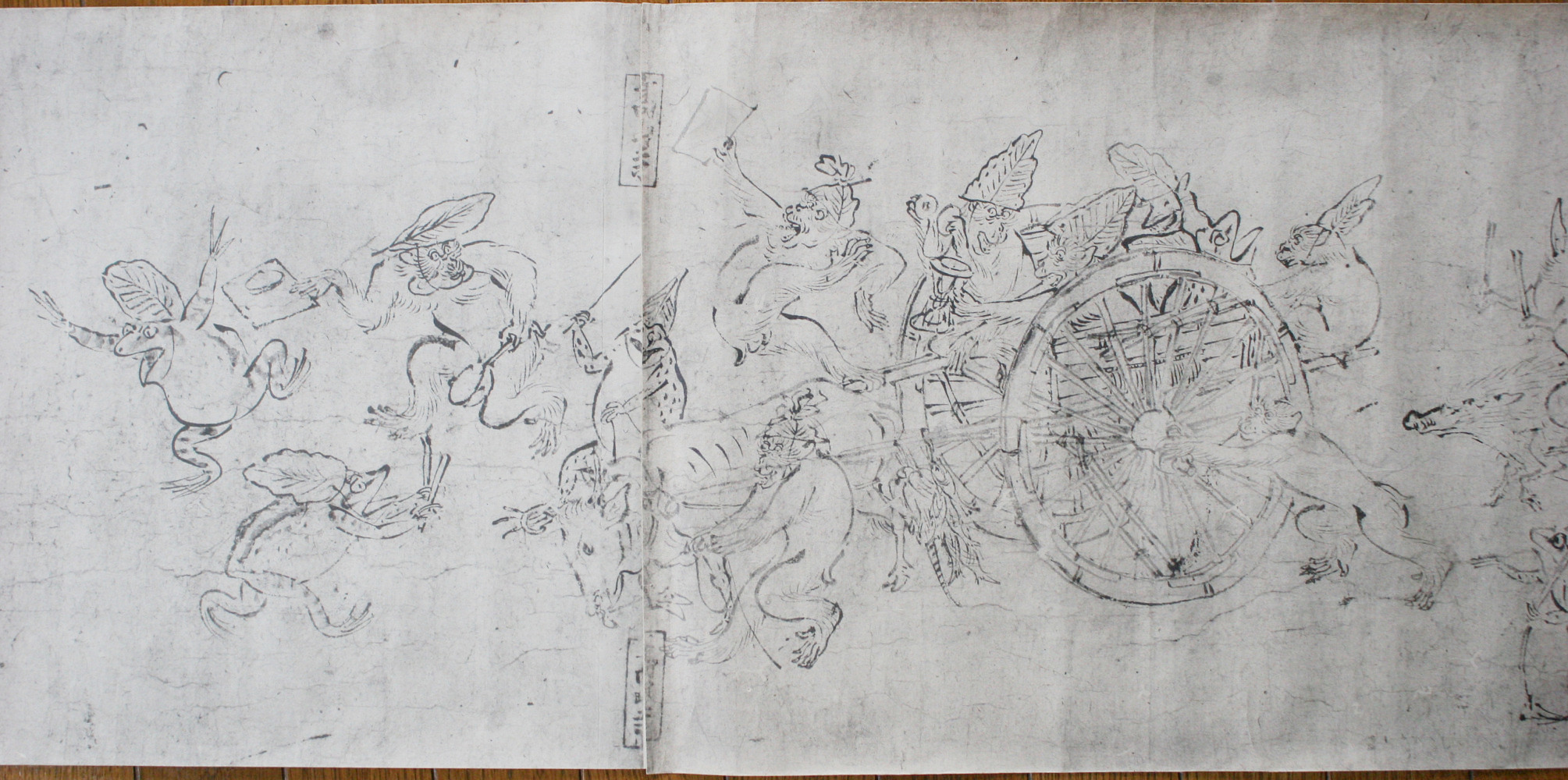
Panel from 3rd scroll with frogs and monkeys harrying an oxcart

Stamp for Kōzan-ji (高山寺) placed on the scrolls.

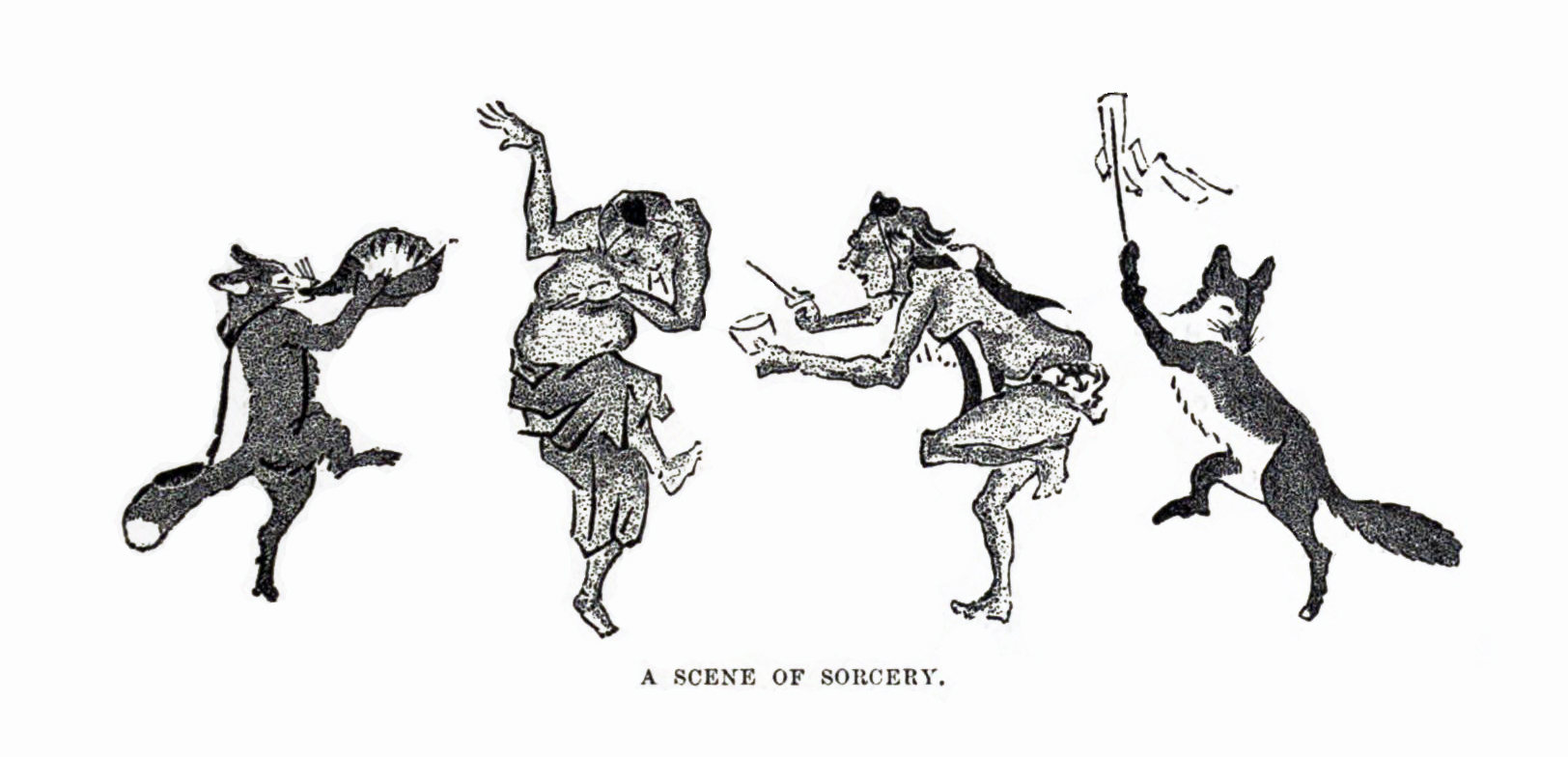
A Scene of Sorcery depicting foxes (kitsune), 19th-century version

== Publications ==
Four publications based on Chōjū-jinbutsu-giga have been released by the publisher Geijutsuhiroba. The first Chōjū-jinbutsu-giga book published by the company was Kokuhō Emaki Chōjū-giga (国宝絵巻鳥獣戯画) which simply compiled the Chōjū-giga emakimono into one publication, released in February 2003, now out of print. A publication made for the anniversary of Chōjū-giga entitled Bijutsu Techō 2007 Nen 11 Gatsugō (美術手帖2007年11月号) was released on October 11, 2007, as a part of the Fine Arts Log (美術手帖) series. All four scrolls were published in actual size in their boxset publication entitled Chōjū Jinbutsu Giga released June 10, 2008. Exclusive to the Suntory Museum of Art exhibition of Chōjū-giga, the same company released a book entitled Kokuhō "Chōjū-jinbutsu-giga Emaki" no Zenbō-ten (国宝『鳥獣人物戯画絵巻』の全貌展). Chōjū-jinbutsu-giga was also released in a shinsōbon (deluxe edition) by Misuzu Shobo. In 1991 a book by Shibundō entitled Chōjū-jinbutsu-giga to Okoe: Emaki was published and written by Nobuo Tsuji.

== Disputes ==
The Yomiuri Shimbun newspaper with Kanta Ishida discussed different theories of what really is the "first manga". Manga artist, Seiki Hosokibara pointed to Shigisan-engi as the first manga in history. Ishida said that the scrolls be treated as masterpieces in their own right, and not be cubby-holed as just the origin of manga and they have no connection with contemporary manga and the domestic works people are familiar with today.

== See also ==
- Katsushika Hokusai
- The Tale of Genji
- Konjaku Monogatarishū
- Lianhuanhua
- Ukiyo-e
- Nishiki-e
- Hokusai Manga
- The Great Wave off Kanagawa
