= Awataguchi Takamitsu =

Japanese painter

Awataguchi Takamitsu (粟田口 隆光) was a Japanese painter during the Muromachi (Ashikaga) period of Japanese history. He helped produce the Yūzū nembutsu engi (融通念仏縁起絵) housed in the Seiryō-ji, a Buddhist temple in Kyoto, Japan. He followed the Yamato-e school. Most of the works he produced were based and inspired by his Buddhist beliefs. He was also a court painter who painted five volumes of the Ashibiki-e scroll paintings during the Ōei period.

== Biography ==
A draughtsman and a painter, Awataguchi Takamitsu was the third son of Tosa Mitsuaki.

== Painting history ==
Awataguchi Takamitsu was a court painter during the Ashikaga period. This period produced Yamato-e and many artists painted Yamato-e on scrolls, sliding doors and screens. Some extant paintings of Awataguchi Takamitsu were found on scrolls. These scrolls keep on the traditional Japanese style, have weak lines and coloring. These Yamatoe-e from the Ashikaga period when compared to those today are different even with the Zen feeling which was prevalent during the Ashikaga period.

The history of the Yamato-e art of the Ashikaga period is not in the Kamakura period scroll format but is in a series of pictures that are separately represented. These period had representations of pictures on scrolls, and screens. One of the works of Awataguchi Takamitsu were referred to in the diary of Prince Sadashige Fushimi which was known as "Kanbun-gyoki" and was described as scroll paintings known as Ashibiki-e (芦引絵).

In Prince Fushimi's diary the Ashibiki-e are summarized as five volumes of scrolls that were painted by a court painter known as Awataguchi Takamitsu in the Ōei period. Prince Fushimi went on to say that these paintings by Takamitsu were stored in the monastery on Eizan until the ninth year of Eikyō (1436 CE) when the fourth volume's text was removed so that it would be rewritten by Emperor Go-Hanazono. At the time or ceremony that the text of the fourth volume was to be written again by Emperor Go-Hanazono, the pictures of the five volumes were instead copied by the emperor and kept for himself. In the tenth year of Eikyō complete sets of scrolls were made by the emperor and texts were added to them. Emperor Go-Hanazono wrote the texts in the first and fifth scrolls originally made by Awataguchi Takamitsu himself, and had Prince Sadashige and the other court nobles write the rest of them.

The pictures in the second scroll of the five were repainted by Mochimori but it is unknown who colored the pictures in the rest of the scrolls. In relation to this record, two volumes of the Ashibiki-e scrolls by Awataguchi Takamitsu were created during the Ōei and Eikyō ages.

These scrolls have been recently found are in the possession of Ichizo Kobayashi. These scrolls were rewritten or redrawn and not the work of Emperor Go-Hanazono's version or Awataguchi Takamitsu's version. The Ashibiki-e scrolls possessed by Mr. Kobayashi look like they were done by one person and one hand and those two sets of scrolls mentioned were written by more than one hand at the same time.

To understand the works of Awataguchi Takamitsu, the Muromachi period in Japan has to be studied and understood. The Muromachi/Ashikaga period was named so because of the Ashikaga clan that occupied the shogunate. The Ashikaga ruled in Japan for almost 200 years but didn't extensively exert their political control like the Kamakura bakufu. Those who influenced political events and trends during this time and who held most of the power were the warlords who controlled provinces and were known as provincial warlords. These warlords were known as daimyō. Because the provincial warlords had greater power than the central government and had increase in power as time went on, there was a shift towards instability and conflict erupted. This conflict resulted in a war known as the Onin War (1467–1477). During this time as the provincial warlords gained power and caused instability, the Akishaga shogunate collapsed during this time and the city of Kyoto, Japan, was destroyed. The country of Japan then was involved in war that lasted a century, which was known as Sengoku. This period of war took place from the last quarter of the fifteenth to the end of the sixteenth century.

== Influence of Buddhism ==
During the time that Awataguchi Takamitsu did most of his paintings, Yamatoe-e paintings were also being completed in large numbers. There were many artists during this Ashikaga period that continued to paint on sliding doors, on screens, and on scrolls. Although not regarded as inventive energy works of art, these paintings maintain the endurance of this particular traditional style way of painting. This can be attributed to the incompatibility between the Zen feeling that had a dominant influence on art during the Ashikaga period and the earlier Yamato-e style of art. Zen means meditation and this school of the Buddhism teaches that through the profound realization that one is an already enlightened being enlightenment is achieved.

The Ashikaga/Muromachi period (1392–1573) had its on style of painting that can be compared to a renaissance of Chinese-style ink painting. Because of the popularity of Buddhism, and the Zen sect of Buddhism, and the support of Buddhism by the current rulers of Japan during the Ashikaga/Muromachi period, the teaching of the Zen doctrine through representation of Buddhism in paintings was widely accepted. Priest painters from this period who included the likes of Josetsu, Shubun, and Sesshu who are important Japanese landscapists and who represented Zen Buddhism can be used to showcase the representation of Zen Buddhism in paintings as illustrated in the paintings of Awataguchi Takamitsu. These Zen monks, as they are known expressed their religious doctrines, convictions, and views by painting in an evoking manner, and painted landscapes, and literary figures. This form of painting is characterized by emphasis on unfilled space, forceful quick brushstrokes, asymmetrical composition and the economy of execution. Since Buddhism was an integral part of Awataguchi Takamitsu's paintings it is necessary to explore it to understand the reason behind his inclusion of his religion into his paintings.

The Zen sect of Buddhism can be traced to have originated in India and came to Japan through China where it was formalized. In China, Zen was known as Chan and spread and was enthusiastically adopted in Japan spreading in the thirteenth century. The religion of Buddhism spread from China to Japan through educated immigrant Buddhist Chinese men who introduced Chinese philosophy, literature, calligraphy and ink painting to the Japanese followers of the Buddhist religion. Chan which then became Zen in Japan was widely received by the samurai class which had political power in Japan in the thirteenth century. Zen Buddhism then continued to grow and spread in Japan and was the most recognized and practiced form of Buddhism between the fourteenth and sixteenth century. The spread of Zen Buddhism in paintings was influenced by a small circle of elite Japanese men of the Ashikaga clan which had political power and influence over the country at the time of Awataguchi Takamitsu. The Ashikaga shōguns embraced art and culture through their private villas which elegantly showcased art and art appreciation visibly through architecture, design, calligraphy, flower arranging, preparation and food service, decorative arts, interior design, garden design and also painting.

== Bibliography ==
- Minamoto, H. An illustrated History of Japanese Art. Japan: Kyoto K. Hoshino, 1935.
- Munsterberg, Hugo. Arts of Japan An Illustrated History. Boston: Tuttle Pub, 1957.
- Swann, Peters C. An Introduction to the Arts of Japan. 15 West 47th Street, New York 36, New York: Frederick A. Praeger, inc.
