= Kose Kanaoka =

Japanese artist and court painter

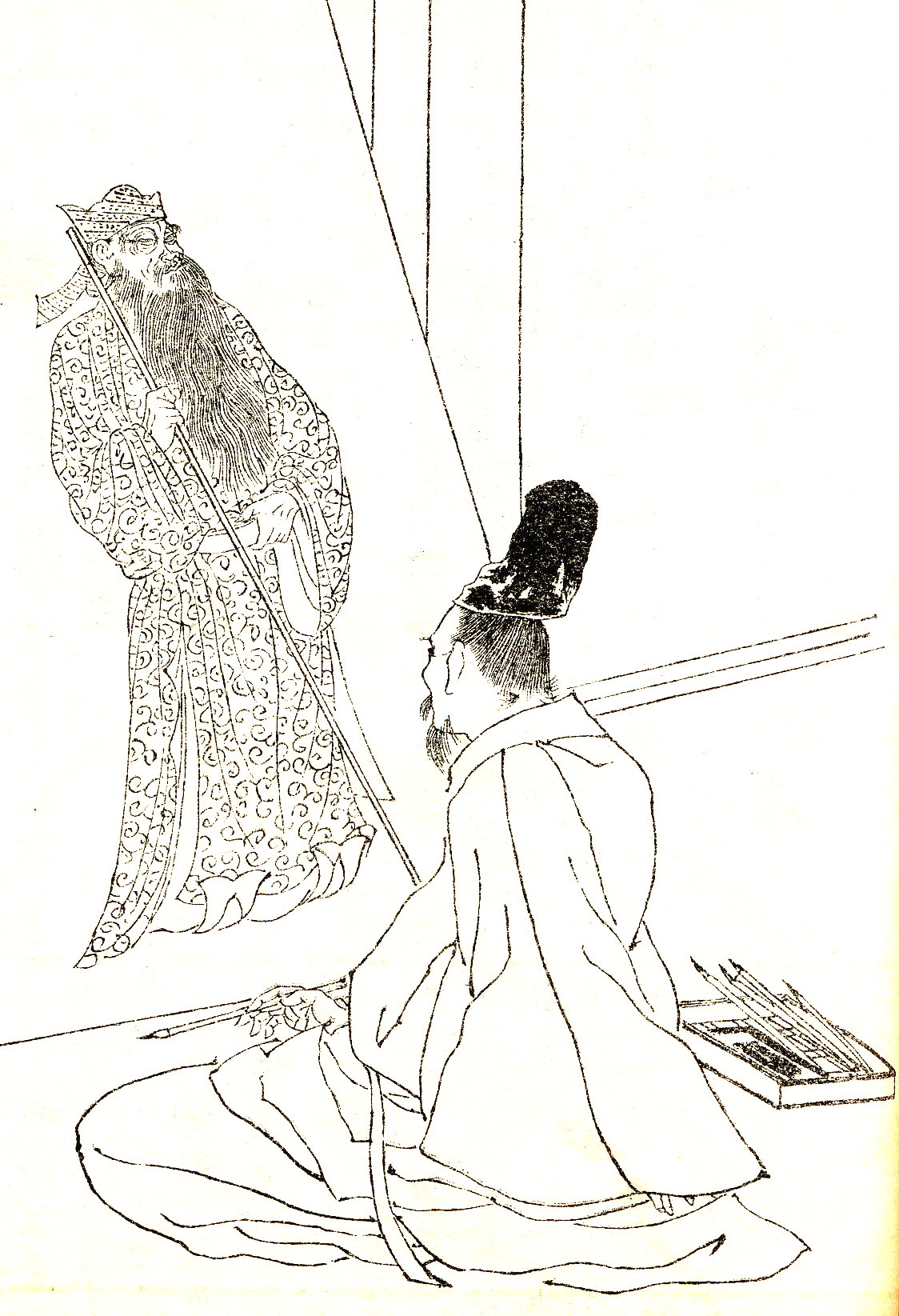
Kose no Kanaoka by Kikuchi Yōsai

Kose Kanaoka (巨勢 金岡, Kose no Kanaoka; c. 802 – c. 897) was a ninth-century Japanese artist, court painter of Heian (Kyoto).

== Biography ==
Known as someone who pursued and added depth to the style unique to Japanese-style painting, he is said to render service by establishing the style of Yamato-e painting, a traditional Japanese style painting of the late Heian and Kamakura periods dealing with Japanese themes. This was when kara-e (Chinese-style painting) lost its influence.

His descendants later formed a circle of painters known as the Kose school, and it greatly influenced the fields of kyuutei-ga (court paintings) and Buddhist paintings. Though few of his works have survived, he is known to have painted landscapes and portraits. He also founded the Kose School of Art, which is named after him. He made the first tonal gradation, and the first Buddha in crayonnage style. This school would change from producing Chinese style paintings with Chinese themes into a more Japanese style of painting techniques.
