= Mount Shigi =

Mountain in the country of Japan

- 信貴山
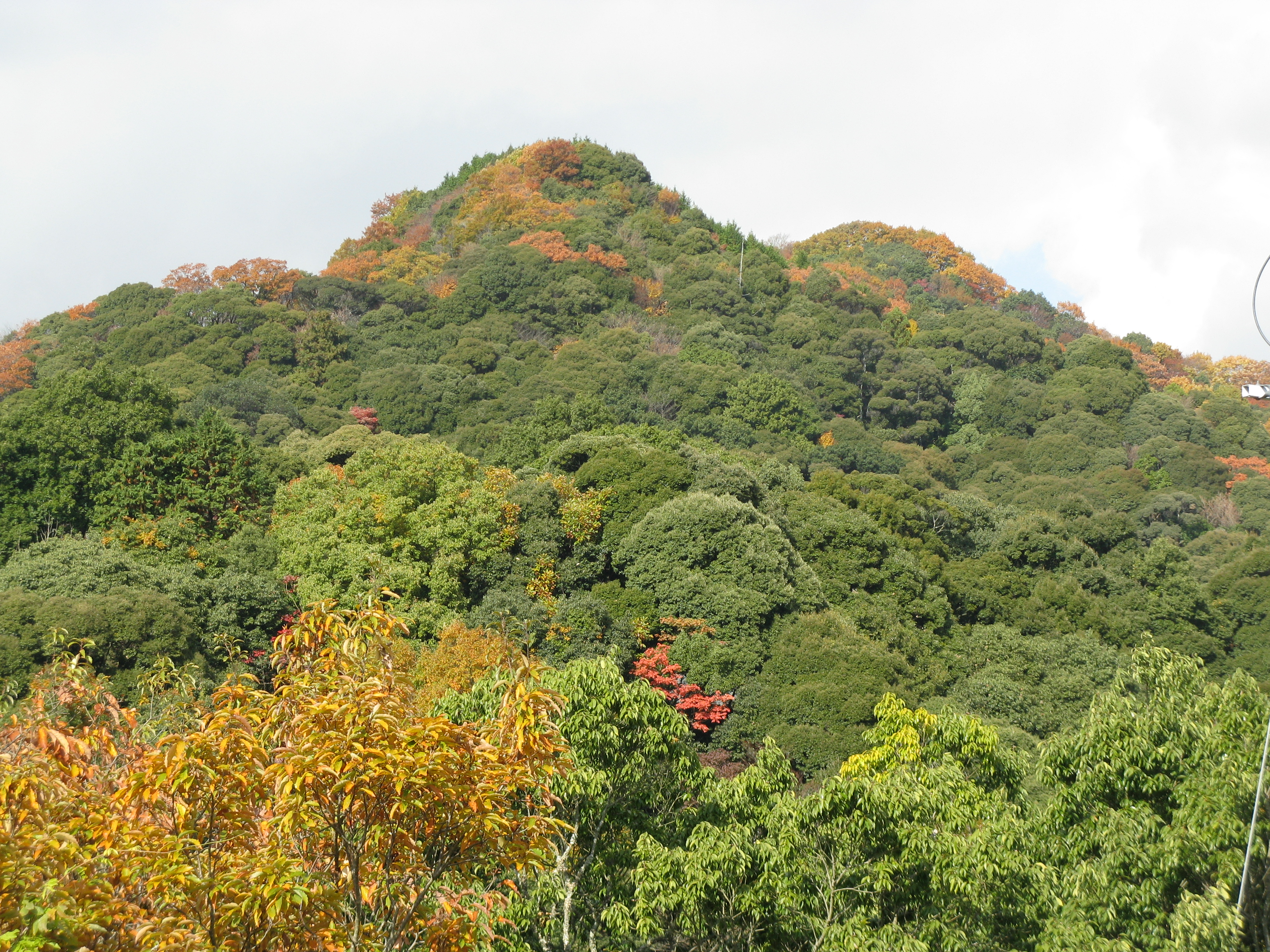

Highest point
- Elevation: 437 m (1,434 ft)
- Coordinates: 34°36′46″N 135°40′06″E

Geography
- Location within Japan
- Location: Nara, Japan
- Parent range: Ikoma Mountains

Mount Shigi (信貴山, Shigisan) is a mountain located in Ikoma District, Nara, Japan.

== Legends ==
=== Legend of Prince Shotoku ===
One of the legends of Mt. Shigi tells of Prince Shotoku asking for victory from the gods over his opponents. Prince Shotoku was a descendant of the Soga family, who had loyalty to Buddhism. During the Year of the Tiger, Prince Shotoku was promoting Buddhism, and was in conflict with the Mononobe family. While at Mt. Shigi, Prince Shotoku prayed for a victory over Mononobe no Moriya. Bishamonten, the Buddhist deity of war, then visited him during the Hour of the Tiger, on the Day of the Tiger. Bishamonten then lead Prince Shotoku to victory in the Battle of Shigisen. Prince Shotoku then built a shrine in his honor.

=== Legends of Mount Shigi ===
A scroll painting called Shigisan-engi depicts three miracles revolving around a monk by the name of Myoren who lived on Mount Shigi.

- First scroll tells the story of Myoren teaching a greedy nobleman a lesson by making his granary fly.

He was drawn to Mt. Shigi by a Buddha statue, where he then built a shrine. He would eat whatever he could find himself, taking upon himself the task of praying for the statue. During the winter, he was visited by his long-lost rice bowl, which brought him rice every day. The rice bowl would go down to the storehouse of a rich farmer, who refused to share his bounty with the monks, scoop out a bowlful of rice and then return to the monk. One day, the farmer traps the bowl as it is scooping out rice, only to have the bowl carry the entire storage house to the shrine. In exchange for sharing his grain with the monks, the monk had the rice bowl return all of the farmer's rice to where it came from.

- Second scroll tells a story of Myoren healing the Emperor.
- Third scroll tells the story of Myoren's sister who in her old age decided to find and re-united with him, her brother.

== See also ==
- Buddhism
- Shigisan Gyokuzōin
