= Minamoto no Takakuni =

Japanese noble and scholar

- 源 隆国
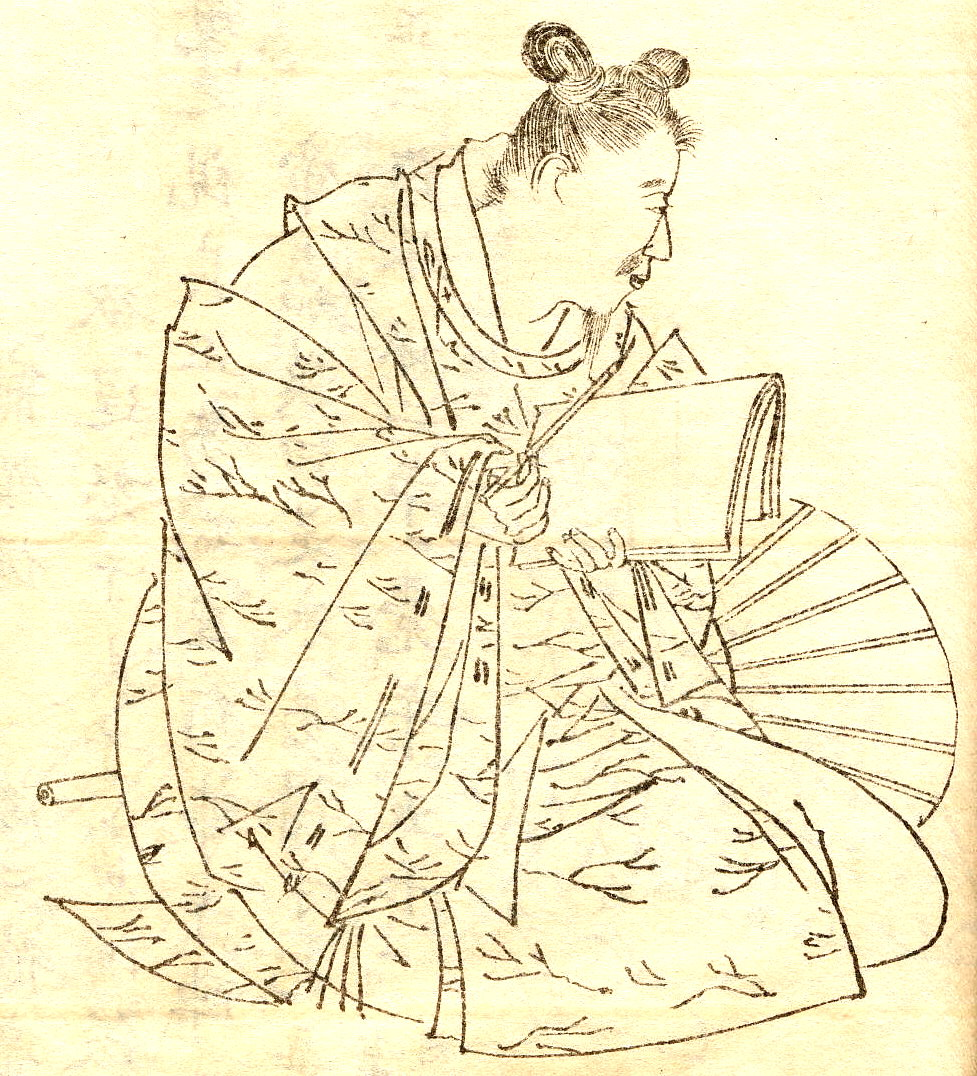
- Minamoto no Takakuni, drawn by Kikuchi Yōsai

Personal details
- Born: 1004 Heian-kyō (Present: Kyoto)
- Died: 1077 (aged 72–73)
- Spouse: Minamoto no Tsuneyori
- Relations: Minamoto no Akimoto (brother)
- Children: Minamoto no Takayoshi; Minamoto no Takatsuna; Minamoto no Toshiaki; Minamoto no Takamoto; Minamoto no Kunitoshi; Kakuyū (Also known as Toba Sōjō); And many others
- Parent(s): Father: Minamoto no Toshikata; Mother: Daughter of Fujiwara no Tadakimi
- Nickname: Uji Dainagon (宇治大納言)

Minamoto no Takakuni (源 隆国) (1004–1077), also known as Uji Dainagon (宇治大納言), was a noble and a scholar of ancient Japan. He was also the father of Toba Sōjō, an important painter.

Takakuni was also mentioned as Dainagon of Uji in "gleanings from Uji Dainagon Monogatari" - a collection of Japanese tales written around the beginning of the 13th century, which no longer exists.

== See also ==
- Minamoto clan
- Uji Shūi Monogatari
