= Uji Shūi Monogatari =

13th-century collection of Japanese tales

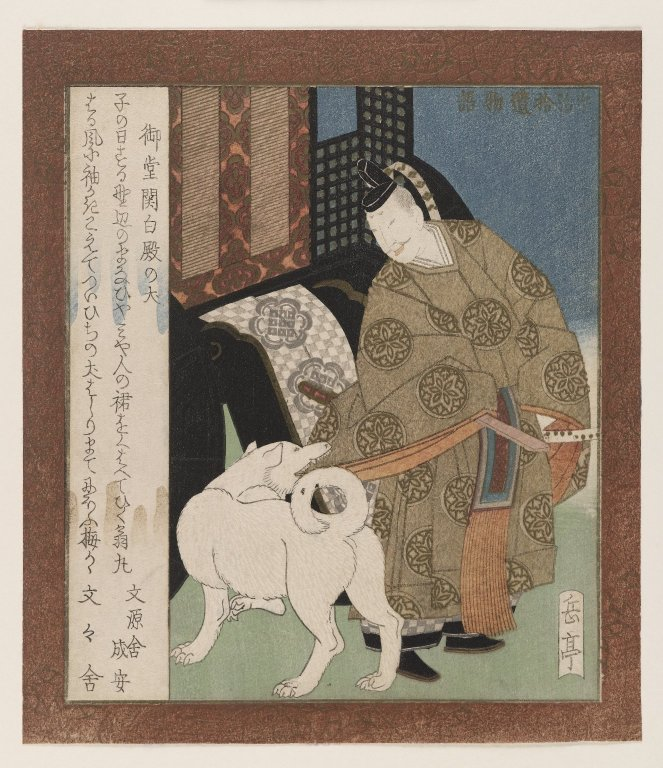
Painting of a man standing next to his dog

Uji Shūi Monogatari (宇治拾遺物語, A Collection of Tales from Uji) is a collection of Japanese tales written around the beginning of the 13th century. The author is unknown, and it may have been revised several times.

The title references the Uji Dainagon Monogatari, a book which no longer exists. The Dainagon of Uji was Minamoto no Takakuni.

The work is classified as setsuwa literature. Following in the footsteps of Konjaku Monogatarishū, it is the representative setsuwa work of the Kamakura period.

== Contents ==
The story is made up of 197 tales spanning 15 volumes. Of the 197, 80 of the stories also appear in the Konjaku Monogatarishū.

The preface states that it contains tales from Japan, India, and China. However, few of them are original, with many stories containing common elements from earlier works such as Konjaku Monogatarishū.

Contents include a number of characters ranging from nobles to commoners and tales ranging from everyday stories to the obscure and comical. Several of the stories were used as a basis for short stories by Ryūnosuke Akutagawa including Hell Screen.

The tales collected in Uji Shūi Monogatari can be split into the following major categories:

- Buddhist tales
- Social tales
- Private tales

Some tales contain Buddhist didactic elements, but the overall work does not place a particularly strong emphasis on Buddhism, setting it apart from many other setsuwa collections.

== Composition ==
It is unknown when Uji Shūi Monogatari was written. Many theories have been produced from literary and linguistic evidence. There is a great deal of variation, but they all generally point to the beginning of the 13th century.

== Translations ==
- English
  - A Collection of tales from Uji: a study and translation of "Uji shüi monogatari. University of Cambridge Oriental Publications. Vol. 15. Translated by Mills, Douglas Edgar. Cambridge: Cambridge University Press. 1970. ISBN 9780521077545. LCCN 59011510. OCLC 830774.
