= Uji Dainagon Monogatari =

Book attributed to Minamoto no Takakuni

Uji Dainagon Monogatari (宇治大納言物語) was a collection of stories said to have been written by Minamoto no Takakuni in the late Heian period. These stories heavily influenced Japanese literature, and later turned up in such works as the Konjaku Monogatarishū and the Uji Shūi Monogatari.

The exact date of its composition is unknown. However, clues are given in the preface to Uji Shūi Monogatari which suggest sometime after 1052 and before 1077.

The book is no longer extant.

== Title ==
The book is referenced in many other stories. The exact title varies and includes the following:

- Uji Dainagon Monogatari (宇治大納言物語)
- Uji Dainagon Takakuni Kyou Monogatari (宇治大納言隆国卿物語)
- Uji Dainagon Takakuni no Monogatari (宇治大納言隆国ノ物語)
- Uji Monogatari (宇治物語)
- Uji Dainagon Takakuni (宇治大納言隆国)
- Dainagon Monogatari (大納言物語)

== Contents ==
The book no longer exists. However, according to the preface of Uji Shūi Monogatari, it contained various stories from India, China, and Japan. Other texts indicate that the stories were Buddhist and secular in nature and included tales about Buddhist karma, miracles, poetry, and humor.
