= Toba Sōjō =

Japanese artist-monk

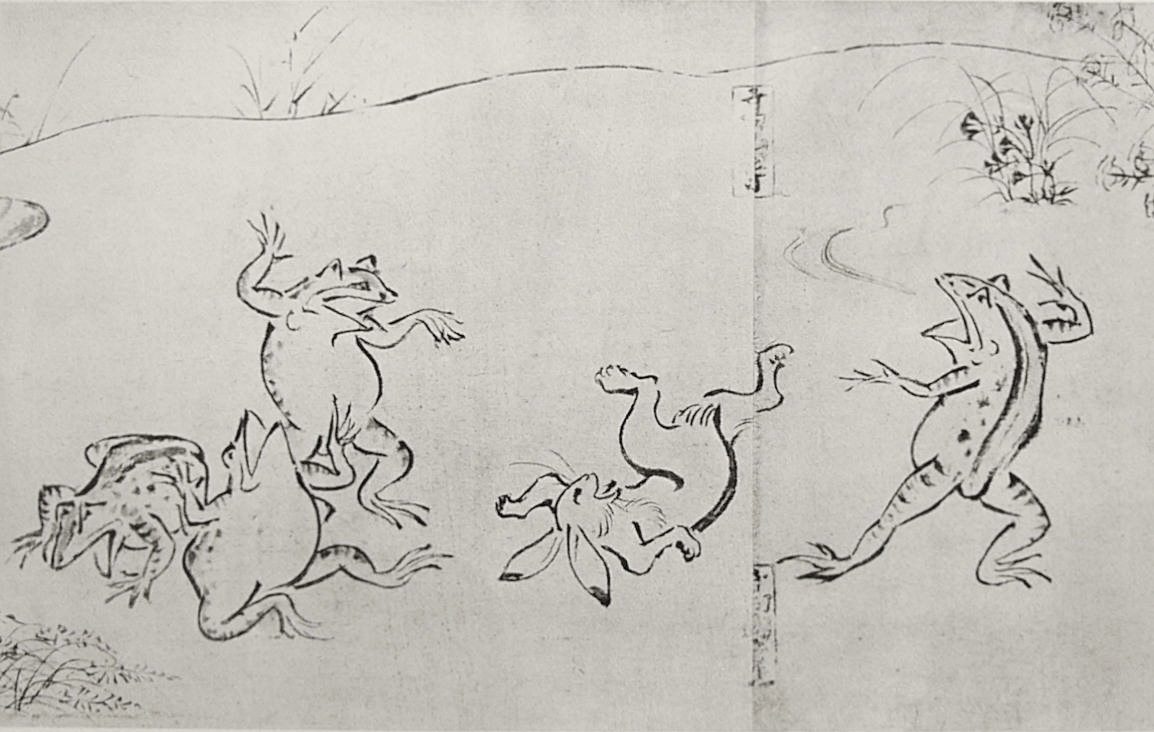
Animals sumo wrestling on the first scroll of Chōjū-giga

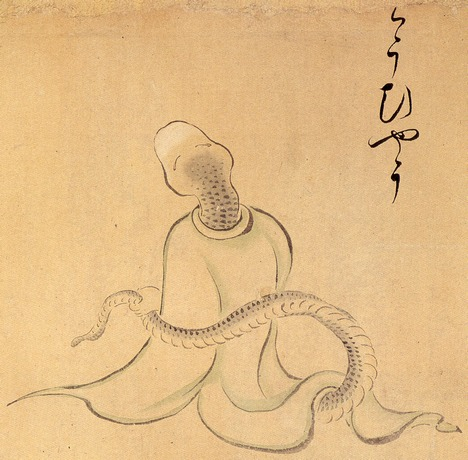
Creature taken from Bakemono-zukushi

Kakuyū (覚猷) (1053–1140), also known as Toba Sōjō (鳥羽 僧正; Bishop of Toba) in his priesthood, was a Japanese artist-monk, and the son of Minamoto no Takakuni.

== Biography ==
Kakuyū was a high priest of Tendai Buddhism. He was advanced to sōjō (僧正; "bishop") in 1132 and then dai-sōjō (大僧正; "archbishop") in 1134. In 1138, he became the 48th zasu (座主; "head priest") (the chief of the Tendai school). He is commonly known as Toba Sōjō, because he lived in Shō-kongō'in (証金剛院), a temple funded by the imperial family and located at Toba, Kyoto.

== As an artist ==
Kakuyū was also an artist proficient in both Buddhist art and satirical cartoon and his work (confirmed to be authentic) includes Fudōmyō'ō-ritsuzō at Daigo-ji, an Important Cultural Property of Japan. Perhaps the most famous one is the picture scroll Chōjū-giga, a National Treasure of Japan and one of the earliest manga—however, this attribution has no proof and may be spurious.

His works are held in the permanent collections of the Metropolitan Museum of Art and the University of Michigan Museum of Art.
