= Konjaku Monogatarishū =

Japanese collection of tales of the late Heian period

Konjaku Monogatarishū (今昔物語集; lit. Anthology of Tales Old and New), also known as the Konjaku Monogatari (今昔物語), is a Japanese collection of over one thousand tales written during the late Heian period (794–1185). The entire collection was originally contained in 31 volumes, of which 28 remain today. The volumes cover various tales from India, China and Japan. Detailed evidence of lost monogatari exist in the form of literary critique, which can be studied to reconstruct the objects of their critique to some extent.

== Title ==
Each tale in the Konjaku Monogatarishū starts with the phrase once upon a time (今は昔) (lit. now long ago), which in its Japanese reading is pronounced ima wa mukashi. The Sino-Japanese reading of this phrase is konjaku, and it is from the Chinese-style reading that the collection is named. The Konjaku Monogatarishū is commonly known by the shorter name "Konjaku Monogatari". Since it is an anthology rather than a single tale, however, the longer title is more accurate.

== Structure ==
The Konjaku Monogatarishū is divided according to the region of the text. The first five volumes, the 天竺 (Tenjiku) section, contain tales set in India. The next five volumes, the 震旦 (Shintan) section, contain tales set in China. The remainder of the anthology, the 本朝 (Honchō) section, contains tales from Japan.

The arrangement of the stories is in parallel to how Buddhism travelled to Japan. The collection emphasizes the path that Buddhism took to Japan in order to further understand what Buddhism means to Japan. First, Buddhism leaves India and becomes very popular in China. As many things have been borrowed from the Chinese, Buddhism then travels to Japan. Each move leads to a morphing of the basics of this religion so by that time it arrived in Japan, it became a new form of Buddhism for the Japanese.

== Contents ==
The subject-matter is largely drawn from Buddhist and popular folklore. The anthology contains no mythology, and references to Shinto-related themes are notably few. The Buddhist tales cover a wide range of topics; both historical tales about the development, transmission and spread of Buddhism along with dogmatic tales which emphasize karmic retribution. The folkloric tales mostly depict encounters between human beings and the supernatural. The typical characters are drawn from Japanese society of the time — nobility, warriors, monks, scholars, doctors, peasant farmers, fishermen, merchants, prostitutes, bandits, beggars, widows. Their supernatural counterparts are oni and tengu.

== Date and authorship ==
The work is anonymous. Several theories of authorship have been put forward: one argues that the compiler was Minamoto no Takakuni, author of Uji Dainagon Monogatari; another suggests the Buddhist monk Tobane Sōjō, and a third one proposes a Buddhist monk living somewhere in the vicinity of Kyoto or Nara during the late Heian period. So far no substantive evidence has emerged to decide the question and no general consensus has formed.

The date of the work is also uncertain. From the events depicted in some of the tales it seems likely that it was written down at some point during the early half of the 12th century, after the year 1120.

== Suzuka Manuscript ==
The oldest extant copy of the Konjaku Monogatarishū is the Suzuka Manuscript (鈴鹿家旧蔵本). Designated as a National Treasure in 1996, it was assembled by a Shinto priest named Tsuretane Suzuka in the Kamakura period (1185–1333). The manuscript was then brought to Kyoto University by a descendant who was a librarian at the university for donation and archiving. The manuscript has been scanned and made available in digital format on the internet.

== Animals in Konjaku Monogatarishū ==
In this work, specific human traits and characteristics such as the ability to think, feel and speak in a human form of cognition are assigned to various types of animals. By assigning human traits to the animals and through the utilization of these anthropomorphic animals, the authorship was more effectively able to communicate the various motifs, which impart a variety of moral teachings. To be able to implement such a paradigm, the authorship would have utilized pre-conceived common traits which were attributable to specific animals. The animals and their respective traits would have been common and implicit knowledge in ancient Japan and therefore known ubiquitously. The types of tales in Konjaku which include the use of anthropomorphic animals can be broadly classified into categories, in which a particular moral is accentuated.

== Significance ==
Many of the tales which appear in the Konjaku are also found in other collections, such as ghost story collections. All these tales, having passed into the common consciousness, have been retold many times over the succeeding centuries. Modern writers have adapted tales from the Konjaku Monogatarishū: a famous example is Akutagawa Ryūnosuke's In a Grove (well known in the West from Kurosawa's film Rashomon). Other authors who have written stories based on tales from the Konjaku include Jun'ichirō Tanizaki and Hori Tatsuo.

The setsuwa ("spoken story") in Konjaku Monogatari Shū has two main purposes: religious and secular. The religious aspect is important in leading the reader into a deeper understanding of Buddhism and what it means to the Japanese people. These stories try to appeal to average people of the time by presenting Buddhism in a simple yet meaningful way, one that people from any background can understand. In these tales both the reward for faith and the punishment for sin will be immediate. The secular aspect of these tales is that they can entertain an audience as well as provide enjoyment for an individual reader.

A cryptic line in Akutagawa's classic short story "Rashōmon" says 「旧記の記者の語を借りれば、『頭身の毛も太る』ように感じたのである。」 (To borrow a phrase from the writers of the chronicles of old, he felt as if 'even the hairs on his head and body had grown thick'.) This is a reference to a line from the Konjaku Monogatarishū, the last part figuratively meaning that he was scared; he felt as if his hair was standing on end.

== Selected translations ==
- Chinese
  - Beijing bian yi she, ed. (2006). Jin xi wu yu. Da duan wen ku (Di 1 ban ed.). Beijing Shi: Xin xing chu ban she. ISBN 9787802250741. OCLC 83517868.
  - Jin xi wu yu ji. Translated by Jin, Wei; Wu, Yan (Di 1 ban ed.). Shenyang: Wan juan chu ban gong si. 2006. ISBN 9787806018408. OCLC 70290716.
- English (Abridged)
  - Ages ago: thirty-seven tales from the Konjaku Monogatari Collection. Translated by Jones, Susan Wilbur. Cambridge, Mass.: Harvard University Press. 1959. LCCN 59011510. OCLC 830774.
  - Konjaku monogatari-shū. Twayne's world authors series. Vol. TWAS 621. Translated by Kelsey, W. Michael (1st paperback print ed.). Boston: Twayne Publishers. 1982. ISBN 9780805764635. LCCN 82002914. OCLC 8243209.
  - Tales of times now past: sixty-two stories from a medieval Japanese collection. Translated by Ury, Marian B. (1st paperback print ed.). Berkeley: University of California Press. 1985. ISBN 9780520054677. OCLC 249404212.
  - The Konjaku tales. Intercultural Research Institute monograph series. Translated by Dykstra, Yoshiko Kurata. Hirakata, Osaka: Intercultural Research Institute, Kansai University of Foreign Studies. 1986–1994.
  - Tales of Days Gone By, a selection from Konjaku Monogatari-shu. Translated by De Wolf, Charles. Matsubara, Naoko, illustrator. Tokyo: ALIS. 2003. ISBN 9784900362000. OCLC 676089499.
  - Of Birds and Beasts, Fish and Fowl: Japanese Tales of Times Now Past, De Wolf, Charles, editor and translator, with Masayuki Furuse, Takatoshi Kuhara, Fuyuko Yamamoto, Kenji Yoshida, 2017, Babel Press, Tokyo ISBN 978-4-89449-532-6
  - Japanese Tales of Fantasy and Folklore: Ninety Stories about Ghosts, Demons and Other Supernatural Beings from the Konjaku Monogatari. Translated by Koriyama, Naoshi. Allen, Bruce. 2024, Tuttle Publishing, Tokyo ISBN 978-4-8053-1864-5
- French
  - Guerne, Armel, ed. (1959). Récits traduits pour la première fois [Selections]. La Fable du monde. Vol. 1. Translated by Tsukakoshi, Satoshi. Paris: R. Delpire. OCLC 458410436.
  - Histoires qui sont maintenant du passé. Connaissance de l'Orient; collection UNESCO d'oeuvres représentatives. Vol. 26. Paris: Gallimard. 1968. LCCN 68143137. OCLC 772827.
  - Histoires fantastiques du temps jadis [selections]. Picquier poche. Vol. 237. Translated by Lavigne-Kurihara, Dominique (1st paperback print ed.). Arles: Editions Philippe Picquier. 2004. ISBN 9782877307499. OCLC 57468644.
- German
  - Konjaku. Translated by Tsukakoshi, Satoshi. Zürich: Niehans. 1956. OCLC 250508090.
  - Hammitzsch, Horst, ed. (1968). Konjaku-Monogatari: Erzählungen des alten Japan. Aus d. Konjaku-Monogatari. Reclams Universal-Bibliothek. Vol. 8960. Stuttgart: Reclam. OCLC 73506372.
- Portuguese
  - Histórias de amor de outros tempos [selections]. Série oriental (Cotovia (Publisher)). Translated by de Figueiredo, Maria Jorge Vilar. Lisboa: Fundação Oriente; Cotovia. 2002. ISBN 9789727950430. OCLC 665141780.

== See also ==
- The Tale of the Bamboo Cutter
