= Rashomon (disambiguation) =

Rashomon is a 1950 Japanese film directed by Akira Kurosawa.

Rashomon, Rashōmon or Rajōmon may also refer to:

== Arts and entertainment ==
=== Literature ===
- "Rashōmon" (short story), by Ryūnosuke Akutagawa, 1915

=== Music ===
- Rashomon (album), by Show Luo, 2010
- Rashōmon, a 1993 album by Ningen Isu

=== Theatre ===
- Rashōmon (Noh play), c. 1420
- Rashomon (play), several different stage productions derived from works by Ryūnosuke Akutagawa
- Rashomon, a 1973 play by Kukrit Pramoj, based on Kurosawa's film

== Other uses ==
- Rajōmon, the gate built at the monumental Suzaku Avenue in the ancient Japanese cities of Heijō-kyō and Heian-kyō
- Rashomon (limestone cave), a feature in Niimi, Japan
- Rashōmon (sake), a Japanese sake brand

== See also ==
- Rashomon effect, derived from the film, a storytelling and writing method in cinema
- Police Station Rashōmon, a manga and TV drama adaptation
