= Rashomon (play) =

Play based on a story by Ryūnosuke Akutagawa

Rashomon is the name of several different stage productions, all ultimately derived from works by Ryūnosuke Akutagawa.

== Source material ==
Ryūnosuke Akutagawa's two short stories "Rashomon" (1915), also known as "The Rashomon Gate", and "In a Grove" (1922), also known as "The Cedar Grove", were famously fused and adapted as the basis for Akira Kurosawa's 1950 award-winning film Rashomon, screenplay by Kurosawa and frequent collaborator Shinobu Hashimoto. In 1951 the film won an honorary International Academy Award, following the success of the film in winning a Golden Lion award at the Venice Film Festival in the same year. The Kurosawa and Hashimoto screenplay deviates from Akutagawa's original stories in a number of ways, most notably by allowing a note of hope to triumph over Akutagawa's dark pessimism.

Neither Akutagawa's story nor any of the plays based on it share anything with the popular traditional Rashōmon (Noh play) (c.1420) about a man who climbs the rajōmon gate to see if a demon is on top of it.

== Stage versions ==
=== Fay and Michael Kanin ===
This 1959 Broadway adaptation by Fay and Michael Kanin ran for six months (January–June) at the Music Box Theatre, New York, starring Rod Steiger and Claire Bloom, who married soon after the play's run ended. The Kanins' production was nominated for three Tony awards.

The Kanins' somewhat sentimental script sticks closely to the film, including elements added by Kurosawa that do not appear in Akutagawa's original short stories. The Kanins later went on to write the film screenplay for the Western The Outrage, which also credits Kurosawa and Akutagawa (but not Hashimoto). The Outrage was one of several Westerns based on Kurosawa's films, most notably John Sturges' The Magnificent Seven, adapted from Kurosawa's historical epic Seven Samurai (1954), and Sergio Leone's ground-breaking "Spaghetti Western" A Fistful of Dollars (1964). The Kanins' script was also staged on U.S. television as a "Play of the Week" (1960).

East West Players (EWP) presented the first intimate staging of the Kanins' script, as their inaugural production in 1966. The show was revived two more times by EWP before retiring (once during their 5th season in 1970, and once in their 20th season in 1986).

More modern adaptations of Rashomon have gone back to Akutagawa's original stories.

=== Ivor Benjamin ===
Ivor Benjamin's 1988 adaptation is from original translations by Jane Guaschi, then a language student at Sheffield University, U.K., and stays closer to the bleaker viewpoint of Akutagawa than the Kanins' version. This adaptation received its international premiere by [Storytellers Theatre Company] (no longer in operation), Ireland, 2005, for which the tour was nominated for two ESB/Irish Times 2005 Theatre Awards: Liam Halligan for Best Director and Chisato Yoshimi for Best Costume Design.

The script has also been performed at Jackson's Lane Theatre, London, UK (1988), the University of the Philippines (2000), in Ashland, Oregon, USA (2005) and by Black Sheep Theatre Company, Rochester, New York, US (2009).

=== Other adaptations ===
Rashomon – adaptation by Meena Natarajan and Luu Pham for Pangea World Theater (2000).

Rashomon – adaptation by Philippe Cherbonnier (after Akutagawa), directed by Kwong Loke, Kumiko Mendl and David K.S. Tse for Yellow Earth Theatre Company, London UK and tour, (2001).

Rashomon – a 1996 English language opera by London-based Argentine composer Alejandro Viñao, with libretto by Craig Raine.
