= The Men Who Tread on the Tiger's Tail =

1952 Japanese film by Akira Kurosawa

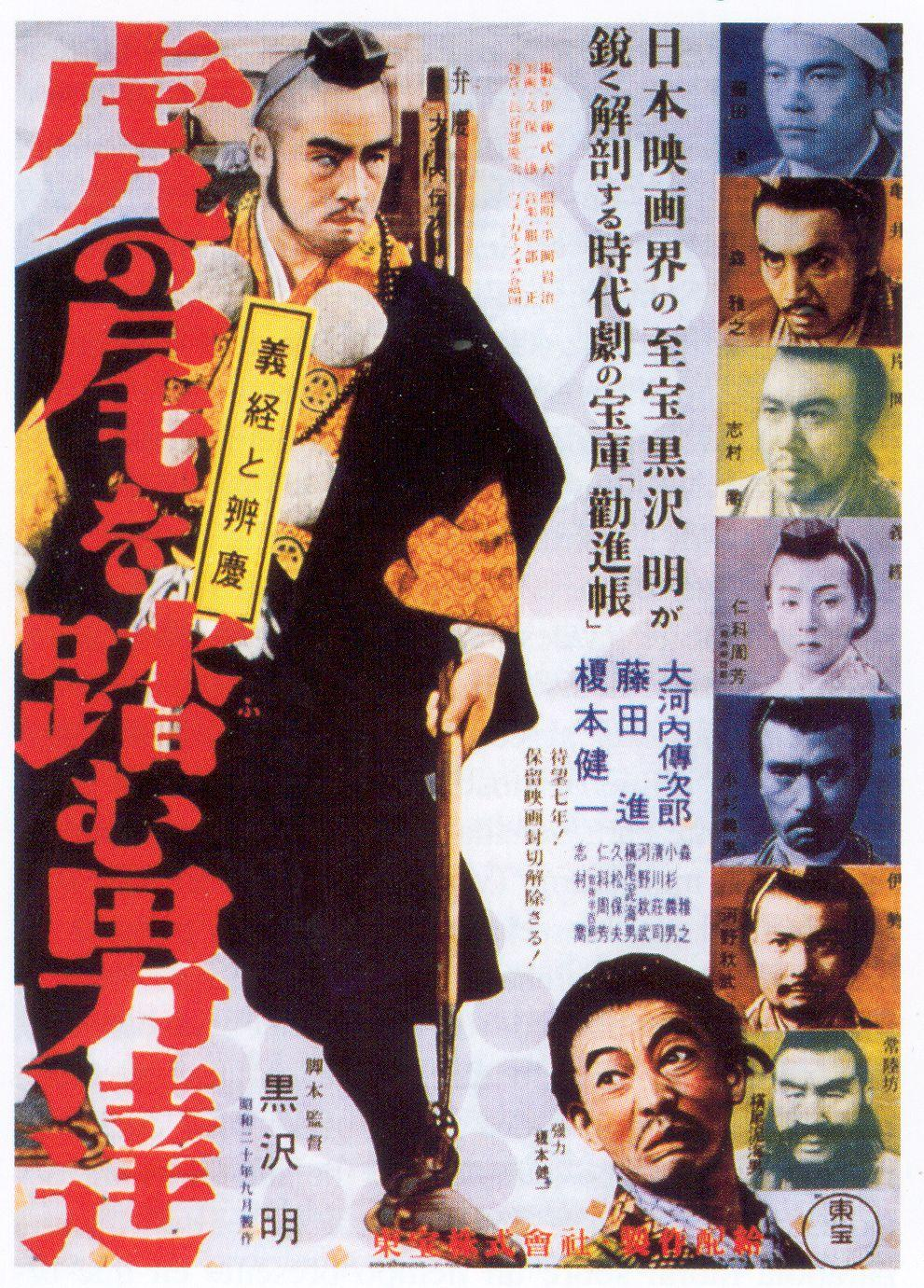
- Theatrical release poster

Japanese name
- Kanji: 虎の尾を踏む男達
Transcriptions
- Revised Hepburn: Tora no O o Fumu Otokotachi
- Directed by: Akira Kurosawa
- Screenplay by: Akira Kurosawa
- Based on: Kanjinchō by Namiki Gohei III; Ataka by Kanze Kojiro Nobumitsu
- Produced by: Motohiko Ito
- Starring: Denjirō Ōkōchi; Tadayoshi Nishina; Susumu Fujita; Masayuki Mori; Takashi Shimura; Ken'ichi Enomoto; Akitake Kōno; Yoshio Kosugi; Dekao Yokoo
- Cinematography: Takeo Ito
- Edited by: Toshio Goto
- Music by: Tadashi Hattori
- Production company: Toho Studios
- Distributed by: Toho Company Ltd.
- Release date: April 24, 1952
- Running time: 59 minutes
- Country: Japan
- Language: Japanese

The Men Who Tread on the Tiger's Tail (Japanese: 虎の尾を踏む男達, Hepburn: Tora no O o Fumu Otokotachi) is a 1952 Japanese period drama film written and directed by Akira Kurosawa, based on the kabuki play Kanjinchō, which is in turn based on the Noh play Ataka. It depicts a famous 12th century incident in which Yoshitsune and a small group of samurai cross into enemy territory disguised as monks.

The film was initially banned by the occupying Supreme Commander of the Allied Powers (SCAP), likely due to its portrayal of feudal values. Kurosawa blamed bureaucratic sabotage by the wartime Japanese censors, who also disapproved. It was later released in 1952 following the signing of the Treaty of San Francisco.

== Plot ==
In 1185, the Heike clan fights against the Minamoto clan. After a bloody naval battle in the Seto Inland Sea, Yoshitsune Minamoto defeats the enemy and the survivors commit suicide. When the triumphant Yoshitsune arrives in Kyoto, his brother, the Shogun Yoritomo, is uneasy and orders his men to arrest Yoshitsune. However, Yoshitsune escapes with six loyal samurai led by Benkei and they head to the country of his only friend Hidehira Fujiwara. Near the border, after crossing the forest disguised as monks, their porter discovers that they are Yoshitsune and the six samurai and advises that the fearful Kajiwara and his soldiers are waiting for them at the border to arrest them. Yoshitsune disguises himself as a porter and at the barrier, Benkei has to convince Kajiwara that they are six monks traveling to collect donations to repair the Todai temple in Nara.

== Cast ==
- Denjirō Ōkōchi as Benkei
- Tadayoshi Nishina as Yoshitsune
- Susumu Fujita as Togashi
- Masayuki Mori as Kamei
- Takashi Shimura as Kataoka
- Ken'ichi Enomoto as porter
- Akitake Kōno as Ise
- Yoshio Kosugi as Suruga
- Dekao Yokoo as Hitachibo
- Yasuo Hisamatsu as Kajiwara's messenger
- Shōji Kiyokawa as Togashi's messenger

== Production ==
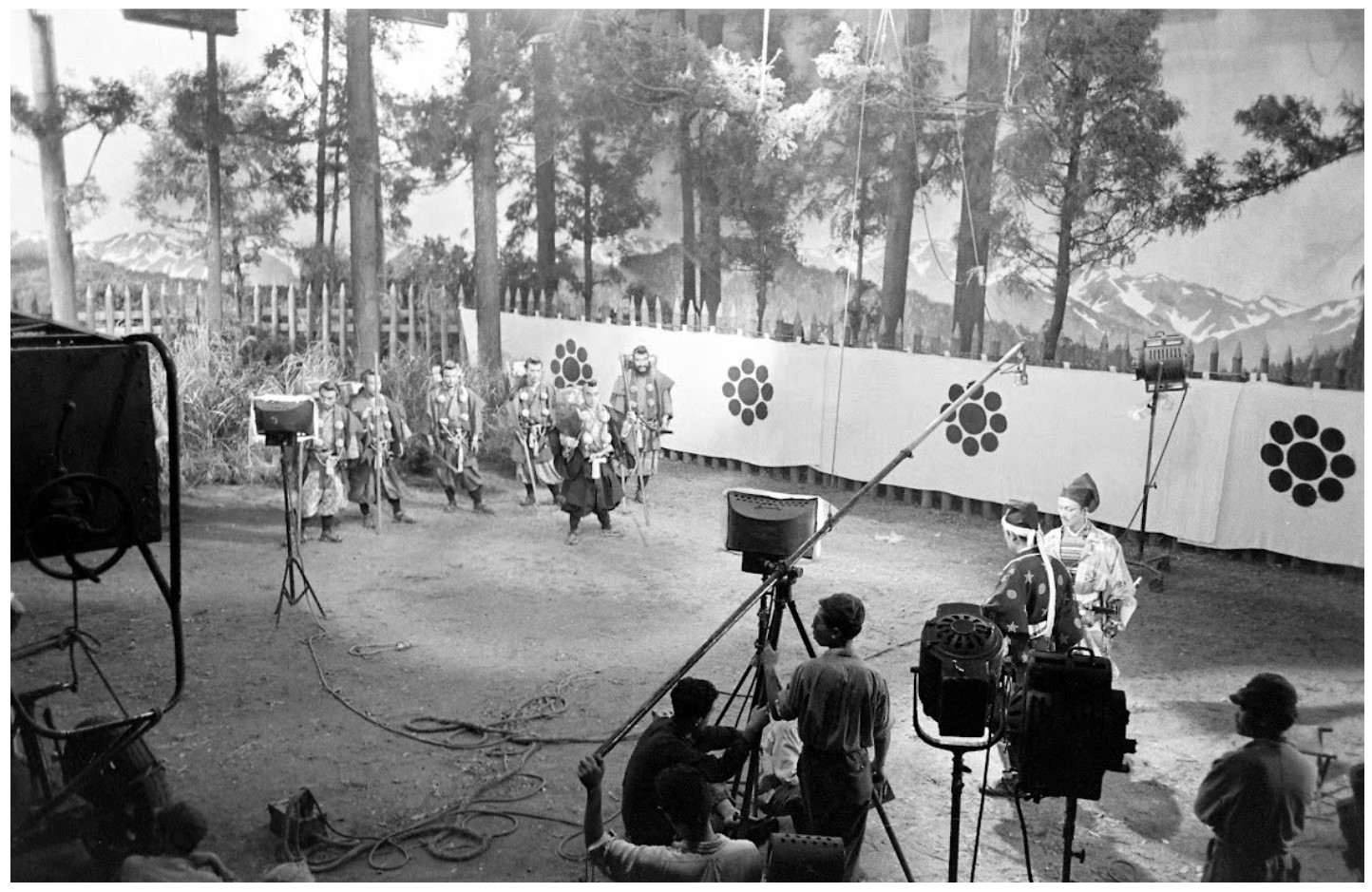
Filming was conducted on a single set (1945)

According to Stephen Prince, Akira Kurosawa was in preproduction on a film about the Battle of Nagashino and Oda Nobunaga's use of firearms to defeat an enemy clan mounted on horseback with swords and spears, but his vision surpassed his resources. (Note: Prince writes that the abandoned project would later become Kurosawa's Kagemusha (1980).) In the last years of World War II, Japan was suffering from extreme privation and Toho had to make do with severely restricted means, such as spotty electricity often leaving them unable to light their sets. So Kurosawa switched to a new film, writing the script for The Men Who Tread on the Tiger's Tail in a single night and promising the studio he would need only one set to make it.

Prince writes that Kurosawa subverts the famous twelfth-century incident that the film adapts by depicting Benkei in full Noh-style costume and "furnishing the seriousness and reverence that everyone expects from the story" with Noh flute and drum music throughout. The director also radically adds a new character in the porter played by comedian Ken'ichi Enomoto, whose "jabbering undercuts the pomposity of the feudal rituals". According to Prince, Japanese censors found it rude that Kurosawa was making fun of a sacred historical incident and, perhaps because of this, they did not give their file on the film to the censors of the Supreme Commander of the Allied Powers.

== Release ==
Japanese censors failed to give a file on the film to the censors of the Supreme Commander of the Allied Powers, thus 1945's The Men Who Tread on the Tiger's Tail was banned as an "illegal, unreported" production. It was not released in Japan until 1952.

The Criterion Collection has released The Men Who Tread on the Tiger's Tail on DVD in North America as part of two Kurosawa-centered box sets; 2009's AK 100: 25 Films by Akira Kurosawa, and 2010's The First Films of Akira Kurosawa, the 23rd entry in their Eclipse series.

== Analysis ==
Critic David Conrad has said that the character of the porter, who does not exist in the original Noh or kabuki plays, prefigures Kurosawa's later commoner characters like the woodcutter in Rashomon and the villagers in Seven Samurai.

The presence of a low-class character among the high and mighty helps anchor the story in familiar ground, and the porter is free to express thoughts that proper samurai leave unsaid... Each of Kurosawa's later jidaigeki, and many of his gendaigeki as well, would use characters of different castes and classes to achieve something similar to this dynamic. His stories play out in three-dimensional social worlds, allowing him to explore events and themes from multiple perspectives.

== Sources ==
- Conrad, David A. (2022). Akira Kurosawa and Modern Japan. McFarland & Co. ISBN 978-1-4766-8674-5.
- Kurosawa, Akira (1983). Something Like an Autobiography. Translated by Audie E. Bock. Vintage Books. ISBN 978-0-394-71439-4.
