= The Outrage =

1964 film by Martin Ritt

- Theatrical release poster
- Directed by: Martin Ritt
- Screenplay by: Michael Kanin
- Based on: "In a Grove" and "Rashomon" by Ryūnosuke Akutagawa; Rashomon by Akira Kurosawa; Shinobu Hashimoto; Rashomon (play) by Fay Kanin; Michael Kanin
- Produced by: A. Ronald Lubin
- Starring: Paul Newman; Laurence Harvey; Claire Bloom; Edward G. Robinson; William Shatner; Howard Da Silva; Albert Salmi
- Cinematography: James Wong Howe
- Edited by: Frank Santillo
- Music by: Alex North
- Color process: Black and white
- Production company: KHF Productions
- Distributed by: Metro-Goldwyn-Mayer
- Release date: October 8, 1964
- Running time: 96 minutes
- Country: United States
- Language: English
- Budget: $3 million
- Box office: $1,800,000 (US/ Canada rentals)

The Outrage is a 1964 American Western film directed by Martin Ritt and starring Paul Newman, Laurence Harvey, Claire Bloom, Edward G. Robinson and William Shatner.

It is a remake of Akira Kurosawa's 1950 Japanese film Rashomon, based on stories by Ryūnosuke Akutagawa adapted to an American setting. As with Kurosawa's film, four people give contradictory accounts of a rape and murder. Ritt utilizes flashbacks to provide these contradictory accounts.

== Plot ==
Three disparate travelers—a disillusioned preacher, an unsuccessful prospector and a larcenous, cynical con man—meet at a decrepit railroad station in the 1870s Southwest United States. The prospector and the preacher were witnesses at the rape and murder trial of the notorious bandit Juan Carrasco. The bandit duped Colonel Wakefield, an aristocratic Southerner, into believing that he knew the location of a lost Aztec treasure. While the greedy Wakefield was bound to a tree and gagged, Carrasco assaulted his wife Nina. These events led to the stabbing of the husband. Carrasco was tried, convicted and condemned for the crimes.

Everyone's account on the witness stand differs dramatically. Carrasco claims that Wakefield was bound with ropes while Nina was assaulted, after which he killed the colonel in a duel. The newlywed wife contends that she had killed her husband because he accused her of luring Carrasco and causing the rape. The dead man's testimony is given through a third witness, an old Indian shaman, who said that neither of those accounts was true. The shaman insists that the colonel used a jeweled dagger to commit suicide after the incident.

There was a fourth witness, the prospector, with a completely different view of what took place. The veracity of that account is no more certain than that of the other three.

== Cast ==
- Paul Newman as Juan Carrasco
- Laurence Harvey as Colonel Wakefield
- Claire Bloom as Nina Wakefield
- Edward G. Robinson as Con Man
- William Shatner as Preacher
- Howard Da Silva as Prospector
- Albert Salmi as Sheriff
- Thomas Chalmers as Judge
- Paul Fix as Indian

== Reception ==
In a contemporary review for The New York Times, critic A. H. Weiler wrote: "It still seems logical that this decidedly unusual mixture of Oriental drama and melodrama is better fitted to old Japan than to the Old West. But even though the present version is on occasion flippant rather than serious, it Is not, by and large, a desecration of an Important work. Suffice it to say that this dedicated troupe has basically cleaved to its unconventional source material. ... In focusing cynically on 'truths' that remain a mystery at the film's end, Mr. Ritt and his willing company have done nobly by the original in their provocative and engrossing drama."

== Home media ==
The Outrage was released to DVD by Warner Home Video on February 17, 2009 as a Region 1 widescreen DVD.

== See also ==
- List of American films of 1964
- The Outrage, 2011 film
