= Ataka (play) =

安宅
- Written by: Kanze Nobumitsu
- Category: 4th — miscellaneous
- Characters: shite Musashibō Benkei waki Togashi kokata Minamoto no Yoshitsune kyogen follower of Togashi
- Place: barrier at Ataka in the Kaga region
- Time: 12th Century
- Sources: Gikei-ki

Ataka (安宅, Ataka) is a Japanese Noh play written in 1465 by Kanze Kojiro Nobumitsu.

It has been described as a masterpiece of genzai noh, a type of Noh play in which the story deals with events in the real world. It is also distinguished from the conventional Noh drama, which is noted for its focus on the idealized beauty of yugen, through its use of songs and dances to highlight dramatic tension. Ataka, along with the two other mainstays of classic repertory of Noh - Izutsu and Atsumori - had a continuous performance tradition that spanned five to six centuries.

Kanze Nobumitsu was a playwright and actor from the Muromachi period, and is considered one of the last important playwrights of the golden age of Noh. Some of his other famous plays are Momijigari, Dōjōji, Funa benkei and Rashōmon.

Ataka has served as the basis for several successful kabuki plays, including Kanjinchō, and the film The Men Who Tread on the Tiger's Tail, directed by Kurosawa Akira.

== Synopsis ==
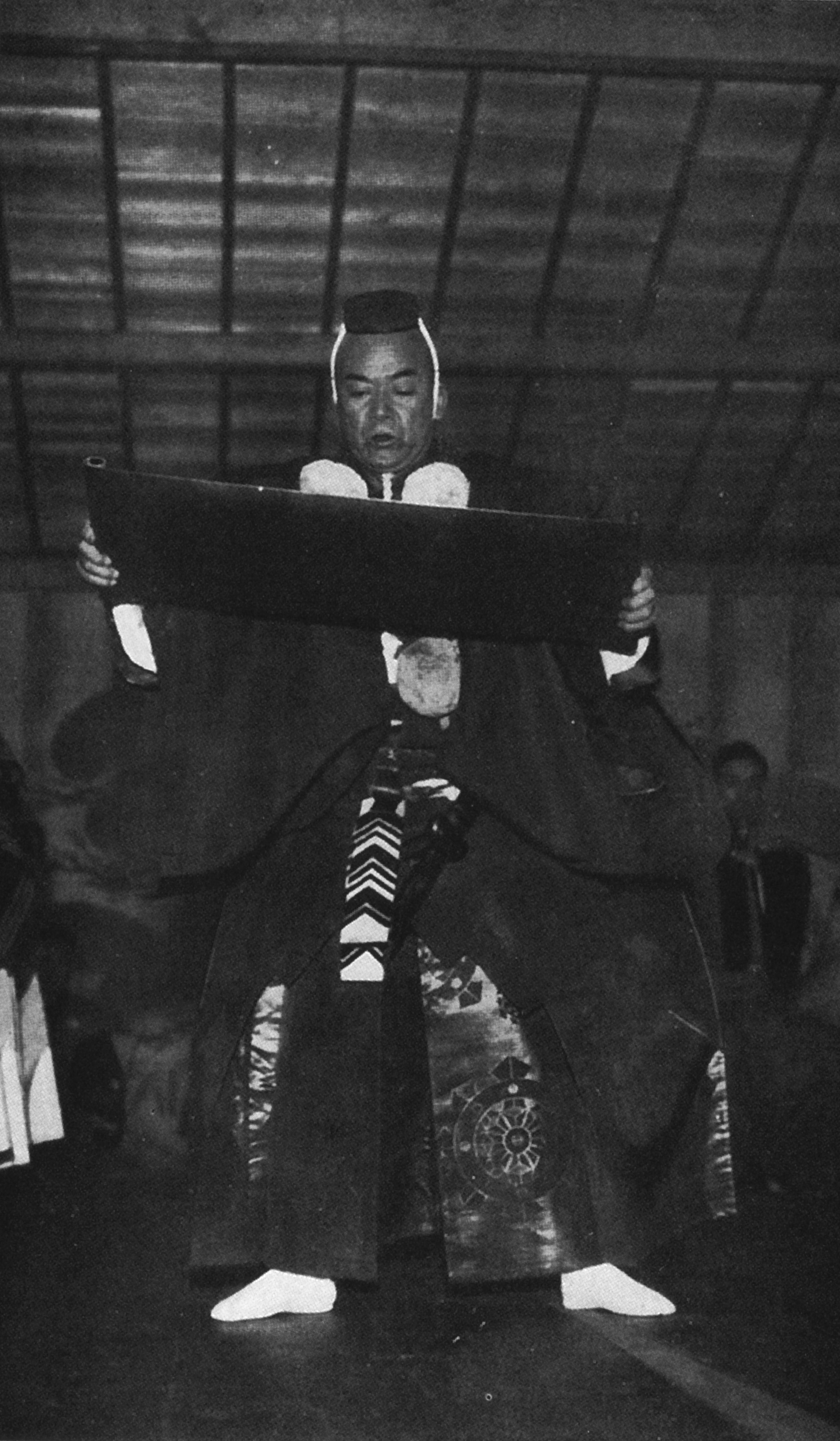
Umewaka Manzaburo performing a scene from Ataka, 1931

Minamoto no Yoshitsune falls out of favor with his brother, the Shogun Minamoto no Yoritomo, and escapes with his followers to Mutsu Province, disguised as priests. They head for a temple called Tōdai-ji (a local branch of the Tōdai-ji Buddhist temple in Nara), but are stopped along the way by a suspicious guard.

The recitation of a fake "subscription list that monks would normally carry" on a mission to rebuild the temple, by Yoshitsune's companion Benkei, convinces the guard to let them pass.

== Influence ==
Ataka was first adapted into kabuki in Kanjinchō (1702), which was written by playwright Namiki Gohei III. This is in fact the first time a Noh play was adapted into kabuki. This is considered a shosagoto or dance piece that eventually became part of the so-called "the eighteen favorites". The later version of Kanjinchō (1840) is one of the most often performed plays in the modern kabuki repertoire.

Another famous kabuki adaptation of Ataka is Gohiiki Kanjinchō (1773), considered "a magnificent example of the flamboyantly masculine aragoto acting style".

Akira Kurosawa's film The Men who Tread on the Tiger's Tail is partly based on Ataka. Made in 1945, the film was banned by the occupying Supreme Commander of the Allied Powers (SCAP) due to its portrayal of medieval native values. It was later released after the signing of the Treaty of San Francisco in 1952.
