= Waki =

Waki or WAKI may refer to:

== Places ==
- Waki, Dahanu, a village in Maharashtra, India
- Waki, Jaoli, a gram panchayat in Maharashtra
- Waki, Vikramgad, a village in Maharashtra
- Waki, Beed, a village in Maharashtra
- Waki, Tokushima, a former town in Japan
- Waki, Yamaguchi, a town in Japan
  - Waki Station, a railway station
- Waki, Mali, a town and commune
- Waki, Poland, a village
- Waki (river), French Guiana

== People ==
- Azumi Waki (born 1994), Japanese voice actress and singer
- Kenji Waki (born 1960), Japanese shogi player
- Masashi Waki (born 1945), Japanese politician
- Philip Waki, Kenyan judge
- Waki' bin Hassan al-Tamimi, one of the Umayyad commanders in the Battle of Bukhara (709)
- Waki' ibn al-Jarrah (745/47–812), Muslim hadith scholar
- Waki Yamato (born 1948), Japanese manga artist

== Other uses ==
- WAKI, a radio station in Tennessee, United States
- Waki Hydroelectric Power Station, Butiaba, Uganda
- Waki-gamae, sometimes shortened to waki, one of the five stances in kendo
- Waki, one of the roles in a Noh play

== See also ==
- Waki System, a shogi opening
