= H. Matsumoto =

Japanese set decorator

H. Matsumoto (松本 春造, Matsumoto Shunzō(Haruzō)) is a Japanese set decorator. He was nominated for the Academy Award for Best Art Direction along with So Matsuyama for their work in Rashomon (1950).
