= Takashi Matsuyama =

Takashi Matsuyama may refer to:

- Takashi Matsuyama (actor) (born 1960), Japanese actor and voice actor
- Takashi Matsuyama (production designer) (1908-1977), production designer and art director
- Takashi Matsuyama, Japanese illustrator and former assistant to Akira Toriyama
