= Momijigari =

Momijigari may refer to:

- Leaf peeping, known as momijigari in Japan
- Momijigari (film)
- Momijigari (play)
