= Ataka =

Ataka may refer to:

- Attack (political party), Bulgarian nationalist political party
- Ataka (play), a Japanese play used as a source for the film The Men Who Tread On the Tiger's Tail
- 9M120 Ataka, a Russian-made anti-tank guided missile
- Japanese Gunboat Ataka on the Yangtze River in the 1930s and during the Second Sino-Japanese War
