= Jiro Onuma =

Jiro Onuma (大沼 二郎, Ōnuma Jirō; February 2, 1904 – June 27, 1990) was a first-generation (issei) Japanese American gay man who was incarcerated in the Topaz Concentration Camp in Topaz, Utah in 1942. Onuma was born in Kanegasaki, Iwate Prefecture in 1904 and moved to the United States in 1923. The collection of his photos and personal belongings held by the GLBT Historical Society in San Francisco is the only material in this archive that tells us about the life of a gay Japanese American man who lived in San Francisco before World War II and was interned in an incarceration camp during the war. Tina Takemoto, a fourth-generation Japanese American artist and a visual studies scholar at the California College of the Arts, created a film titled Looking for Jiro (2011) that was based on Onuma's archival materials and received the Best Experimental Film Jury Award at the Austin LGBT International Film Festival.

== Early life ==
Jiro Onuma was born in 1904 in Kanegasaki, Iwate Prefecture in Japan as a son of Kogoro Onuma and Mina Sajima. He left Yokohama Port, taking Shinyō Maru (真洋丸) from Yokohama on November 29, 1923, and arrived in San Francisco on December 18, 1923. Before his incarceration, he worked at Mercury Laundry and Cleaners in the Tenderloin neighborhood in downtown San Francisco. Onuma's photographs taken during the pre-World War II period and preserved in the GLBT Historical Society tell us about some aspects of his and his bachelor Japanese American friends' lives from the early 1920s to the 1930s. The archival materials also show that Onuma collected male fitness magazines and was a fan of 1920s and 1930s pioneer bodybuilder and trainer Earle E. Liederman. Onuma's passport shows that he briefly visited Japan and returned to San Francisco on January 29, 1936, on the Asama Maru (浅間丸).

== World War II ==
Executive Order 9066 was issued on February 19, 1942, and Onuma was incarcerated first in the Tanforan Assembly Center and later moved to the Topaz Concentration Camp in Topaz, Utah, on September 11, 1942, at the age of 38. According to the records in the National Archives, Onuma was assigned an individual number of 20747G and a file number of 607913. Tina Takemoto, a fourth-generation Japanese American artist and a visual studies scholar at the California College of the Arts, discovered that three photos in the archive were taken inside the concentration camps and that one of those photos, a group photo of the workers of the Block Three mess hall taken in July 1943, was taken in the Topaz concentration camp. This photograph shows that Onuma worked in a mess hall. In another photograph taken in Topaz, Onuma was photographed with a man named Ronald, whose family name is unknown and whose portraits appear multiple times in Onuma's private photo albums. Takemoto claims that Ronald and Onuma were in a relationship and that Ronald sent his photograph of himself and his friends to Onuma after Ronald was sent to the Tule Lake Concentration Camp. This photograph is still in Onuma's album today. Onuma was released from the Topaz Concentration Camp on May 16, 1944.

== Post-war period ==
After his release from Topaz, Onuma worked in Salt Lake City but soon moved to Denver, Colorado, where he worked for two years. He eventually returned to San Francisco. Onuma became a naturalized citizen of the United States in 1956. His archival record testifies that he returned to Japan several times in the 1980s to visit his family. He died on June 27, 1990, in San Francisco at the age of 86. In accordance with his will, half of his estate was donated to Kimochi, Inc. in San Francisco, a nonprofit organization providing care for seniors in the Japanese American community.

== Archive ==
Onuma's archive, held by the GLBT Historical Society in San Francisco, consists of two photo albums, identity documents, a fitness magazine, unused postcards, pens, tiepins, and other personal belongings of his. In 2009, the GLBT Historical Society's first artist-in-residence, E.G. Crichton, hosted an event and exhibition titled LINEAGE: Matchmaking in the Archive. In the style of "matchmaking," Crichton assigned queer archival materials to the artists she invited and asked them to create something in response to those archival materials. TT Takemoto was assigned to work on Onuma's archive. She created Gentleman's Gaman: A Gay Bachelor's Japanese American Incarceration Camp Survival Kit (2009), which engaged with arts and crafts created in concentration camps by Japanese American inmates known as the "art of gaman." Takemoto later created a film titled Looking for Jiro (2011), a drag-king performance based on Onuma's archival materials, which received Best Experimental Film Jury Award at the Austin LGBT International Film Festival.
