= Momijigari (play) =

Japanese folk play

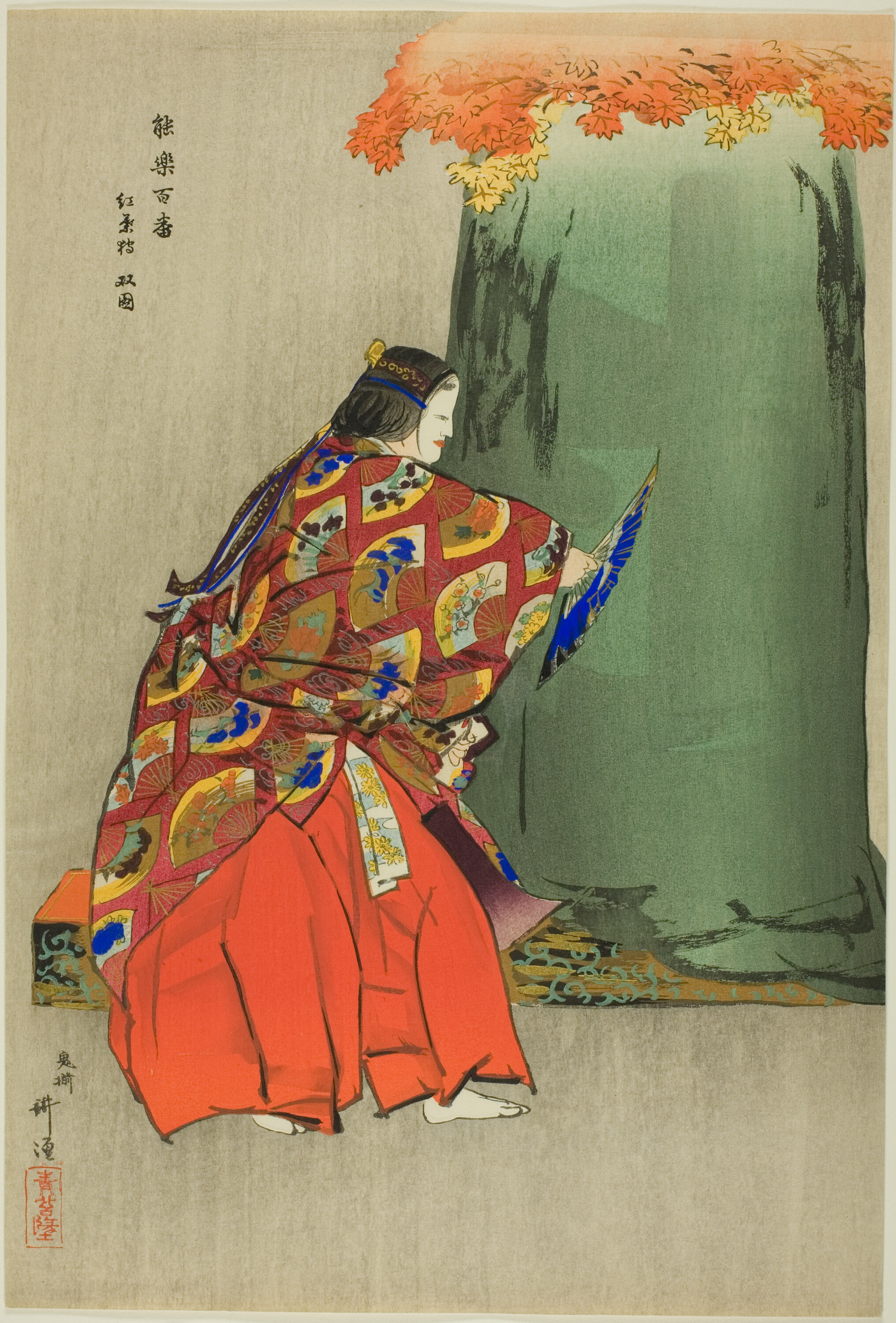
Momijigari by Tsukioka Kōgyo in the Art Institute of Chicago

Momijigari (紅葉狩) or Maple Viewing (English title) is a Japanese folk law narrative, performed as theatre in both kabuki as a shosagoto (dance-focused play) and in Noh versions. It was also the first narrative ever filmed in Japan. The Noh play was written by Kanze Nobumitsu during the Muromachi period. Other titles for the play include Yogoshōgun and Koremochi.

== The Noh Play ==
Momijigari was originally a Noh play, written by Kanze Nobumitsu (d. 1516).

A beautiful woman of seemingly high rank (played by the shite or lead actor), along with her retinue of female attendants (the tsure) are visiting Togakushi-yama, a mountain in Shinano Province, here for the seasonal maple-leaf viewing. The group commence a banquet.

A warrior of the Taira clan who has been out deer-hunting approaches. He is Taira no Koremochi (平維茂)} (played by the waki or secondary actor). Rather than to disturb the party by riding past, he dismounts, intending to leave. But he is accosted by the lady to drink sake with her. Koremochi becomes drunk, and the lady forces more drinks on him. At this point the lady's dance increases a more furious tempo, changing from chū no mai to kyū no mai. When Koremochi falls asleep, she abandons him, saying never to wake from his dream.

There is a change of scenery, and everything turns bleak and dreary. A deity of the Take-uji (武氏, "samurai"), acting as emissary from the Hachiman shrine appears to Koremochi, and reveals to him that the lady is actually a demon (kijo) which needs to be defeated, granting Koremochi a "divine sword". (Note: The text reads onpakase (御佩刀) which merely means the "august girded sword", but is translated "espada divina" into Spanish.)

The lady has now transformed into a fire-breathing demon in the glow of lightning (the noh masks used are traditionally shikami (顰) but recently hannya has come into use.). The warrior is undaunted, and after a pitched battle, slays the demon with the sword.

== Kabuki and puppet play adaptations ==
The work was adapted for the jōruri puppet theater by Chikamatsu Monzaemon in 1715, under the title Momijigari Tsurugi no Honji '"Viewing the Autumn Foliage and the True Origin of the Sword").

It was also remade for the kabuki theater a number of times during the Edo period, but usually as short dance pieces.

=== Kabuki dance in Meiji ===
In 1887, a kabuki dance version of the play was staged, starring the popular actor Ichikawa Danjūrō IX as Sarashinahime (demon). (Note: Nakamura Shikan IV (中村芝翫 (4代目)) played Yamagami (the mountain god) and Ichikawa Sadanji I (市川左團次 (初代)) played Koremochi.)

This performance followed the script newly written by Kawatake Mokuami in the Meiji Period, based on an earlier work from 1849. It adheres to the basic plot of the Noh play, but with some differences. The demon-princess is given the name Sarashina-hime; the deity warning the warrior is now a Yamagami ("mountain god") sent by Hachiman; and the divine sword given to the warrior Koremochi is identified as the Kogarasumaru. The demon employs a maple branch to parry Koremochi's sword, until the branch is knocked out of its hand. It then uses its glaring gaze to immobilize Koremochi. However, Koremochi’s magic sword continues fighting of its own accord and kills the demon.

This version was written to be accompanied by Takemoto, nagauta and Tokiwazu music.

It was an unprecedented performance, with the reigning Emperor Meiji officially in the audience. This was a break from tradition as kabuki had customarily been deemed beneath the dignity of viewing by the higher echelons of society. The performance also led to the first narrative filmed in Japan.

== The 1899 film ==
In 1899 Ichikawa Danjūrō IX, along with Onoe Kikugoro V as Koremochi, revived the kabuki version of the play. In November of that year, a scene from the play was filmed by the pioneering Japanese filmmaker Shibata Tsunekichi. This 3 minute 50 second long scene is the earliest surviving motion picture to be made in Japan.

Danjūrō was originally opposed to appearing in films, dismissing them as foreign but was eventually convinced that his doing so would be a gift to posterity.

The film is available for viewing at the National Film Center in Tokyo. As one of Japan's earliest films, it was designated an Important Cultural Property in 2009.
