= Rashōmon (short story) =

1915 short story by Ryūnosuke Akutagawa

- Short story by Ryūnosuke Akutagawa
- Original title: 羅生門
- Translator: Ivan Morris
- Language: Japanese

Publication
- Publisher: Teikoku Bungaku
- Publication date: 1915
- Publication place: Japan
- Media type: Print

"Rashōmon (羅生門)" is a short story by Ryūnosuke Akutagawa based on tales from the Konjaku Monogatarishū.

The story was first published in 1915 in Teikoku Bungaku. Akira Kurosawa's film Rashomon (1950) is in fact based primarily on another of Akutagawa's short stories, "In a Grove"; only the film's title and some of the material for the frame scenes, such as the theft of a kimono and the discussion of the moral ambiguity of thieving to survive, are borrowed from "Rashōmon".

== Plot summary ==
The story recounts the encounter between a servant and an old woman in the dilapidated Rashōmon, the southern gate of the then-ruined city of Kyoto, where unclaimed corpses were sometimes dumped. The current name of the gate in the story, but not the plot, comes from the Noh play Rashōmon (c. 1420).

The man, a lowly servant recently fired, is contemplating whether to starve to death or to become a thief to survive in the barren times. He goes upstairs, after noticing some firelight there, and encounters a woman who is stealing hair from the dead bodies on the second floor. He is disgusted, and decides then that he would rather take the path of righteousness even if it meant starvation. He is furious with the woman.

But the old woman tells him that she steals hair to make wigs, so she can survive. In addition, the woman who she is currently robbing cheated people in her life by selling snake meat and claiming it was fish. The old woman says that this was not wrong because it allowed the woman to survive — and so in turn this entitles her to steal from the dead person, because if she doesn't, she too will starve. The man responds: "You won't blame me, then, for taking your clothes. That's what I have to do to keep from starving to death". He then brutally robs the woman of her robe and disappears into the night.

== Popular culture ==
The story itself also plays a part in the 1999 movie Ghost Dog: The Way of the Samurai, directed by Jim Jarmusch.

The story is the inspiration for an instrumental rock tune of the same name composed by Japanese instrumental guitarist Takeshi Terauchi and originally played by Japanese instrumental rock group Takeshi Terauchi & Blue Jeans on their 1972 album, Rashomon.

The manga Bungo Stray Dogs features a character named after Akutagawa with heavy references to Rashōmon.

The story is assigned for Modern Japanese high school coursework and quoted in the manga After the Rain.

The 2017 graphic novel Rashomon: A Commissioner Heigo Kobayashi Case by Victor Santos is also inspired from the short stories of Akutagawa and the eponymous movie of Kurosawa as well as by the forty-seven rōnin episode, rendered in the eponymous book by Jirō Osaragi.
