= Takemoto =

Japanese surname

Origin
- Origin: Japan

Takemoto (written: 竹本, 竹元, 武本 or 嶽本) is a Japanese surname. Notable people with the surname include:

- Eiji Takemoto (竹本 英史; born 1973), Japanese voice actor
- Takemoto Gidayū (竹本 義太夫; 1651–1714), Japanese playwright and puppet theatre director
- Iwao Takamoto (1925–2007), American animator, television producer, and film director
- Izumi Takemoto (竹本 泉; born 1959), Japanese manga artist
- Kazuhiko Takemoto (竹本 一彦; born 1955), Japanese footballer and manager
- Masao Takemoto (竹本 正男; 1919–2007), Japanese artistic gymnast
- Naokazu Takemoto (竹本 直一; born 1940), Japanese politician
- Novala Takemoto (嶽本 野ばら; born 1968), Japanese author and fashion designer
- Tina Takemoto, American artist
- Yasuhiro Takemoto (武本 康弘; 1972–2019), Japanese director of anime series
- Yoshiyuki Takemoto (竹元 義幸; born 1973), Japanese footballer
- Yukari Takemoto (竹本 ゆかり; born 1955), Japanese swimmer
