= Takayama Chogyū =

Japanese author

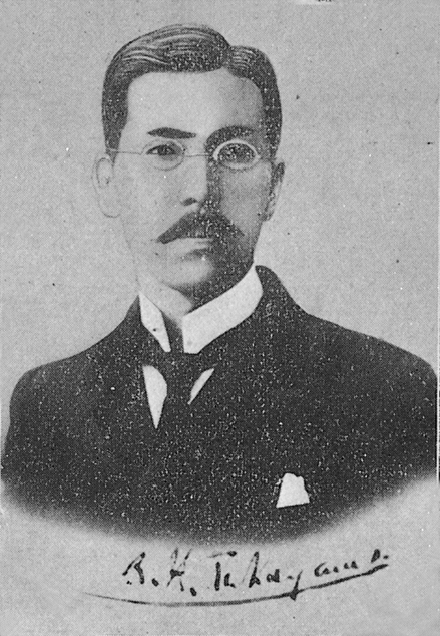
- Born: 28 February 1871; Tsuruoka, Yamagata, Japan
- Died: 24 December 1902 (aged 31); Chigasaki, Kanagawa, Japan
- Occupation: Writer
- Writing career
- Genres: Novels, art history, Buddhist philosophy

Takayama Chogyū (高山 樗牛; Saitō Rinjirō (斎藤 林次郎) 28 February 1871 – 24 December 1902) was a Japanese writer and literary critic. He influenced Japanese literature in the late Meiji period with his blend of romantic individualism, concepts of self-realization, aesthetics, and nationalism. However, many of Chogyū's works seem cryptic to readers today, due to the archaic style he employed.

== Early life ==
Chogyū was born in what is now the city of Tsuruoka in Yamagata Prefecture. His father was a minor samurai of the Shōnai Domain, who found employment with the police after the Meiji Restoration. At the age of two he was adopted by his aunt's family.

In 1887 he entered high school in Sendai, where he excelled in English and English literature. While studying philosophy at Tokyo Imperial University, he was influenced by Thomas Hill Green's concepts of self-realization and nationalism.

== Career and life ==
Chogyū entered and won a fiction contest sponsored by Yomiuri Shimbun newspaper for his semi-historical romance, Takiguchi Nyūdō. It was his first, and only, novel. While still a student, he co-founded the literary journal Teikoku Bungaku (Imperial Literature) and submitted articles to the literary magazine, Taiyō (Sun), of which he later became senior editor. He also changed his official residence to Hokkaidō to avoid military conscription.

In 1896, Chogyū returned to Sendai to teach English and logic at a prestigious high school. A student revolt the following year forced him give up teaching to edit a literary magazine, and he returned to Tokyo. It was at this time that he married Satō Sugi.

During the surge of ultra-nationalism that enveloped Japan in the wake of the First Sino-Japanese War of 1895 and the Triple Intervention, Chogyū wrote about his identity as a Japanese. Chogyū wrote patriotic articles emphasizing the oneness of the Emperor with his subjects. He also praised the concept of individualism as described in the writings of Walt Whitman. He was also an advocate of Pan-Asianism, asserting that the general trend of western civilization was that of racial nationalism, and that any alliances with Western nations would yield eventually to competition, if not a racial war. However, Chogyū later expressed concern with Japanese militarism.

In 1898, while a lecturer at Waseda University, Chogyū asserted that the merit of historical paintings was in the beauty of the painting itself, which revealed the idealized beauty, or aesthetics of a historical period. He published Kinsei Bigaku (Modern Aesthetics) in 1899, presenting theories somewhat at odds with Mori Ōgai's Outline of Aesthetics.

In 1900, Ministry of Education selected Chogyū to study in Europe together with Natsume Sōseki with a position at Kyoto Imperial University waiting for him on his return, but he developed tuberculosis and declined. During his convalescence, he wrote articles praising Friedrich Nietzsche and on aesthetics. In 1901, Chogyū became a professor at Toyo University. Teaching one day a week, he devoted most of his time to writing. In 1902, he received a doctorate in literature from Tokyo Imperial University, writing about Asuka period art. The work left him exhausted.

== Health decline and death ==
As sea air was thought to be helpful for lung ailments, Chogyū moved from Tokyo to the seaside resort towns of Atami, Shimizu, Ōiso, and finally to Kamakura in an effort to cure his disease. With the likelihood of recovery increasingly remote, he turned his attention the teachings of the 13th-century Buddhist leader Nichiren. He continued to write, but on religious philosophy, especially Nichirenism. However, his condition worsened and he died on 24 December 1902 at a hospital in nearby Chigasaki. He lived in a house within the precincts of Kamakura's Hase-dera during the last year of his life, and his funeral rites were at the temple.

His grave is located at Ryuge-ji, a temple in Shimizu, Shizuoka Prefecture. The inscription on the grave is from one of his writings: "Obviously we should transcend the present."

Although Chogyū's literary career spanned a mere six years, he had a major impact on other Japanese writers; he is largely unknown outside Japan.
