= Waki, Dahanu =

Village in Maharashtra

Waki
- village
- Location in Maharashtra, India Waki (India)
- Coordinates: 19.7608113°N 73.1570876°E
- Country: India
- State: Maharashtra
- District: Palghar
- Taluka: Dahanu
- Elevation: 71 m (233 ft)

Population (2011)
  - Total: 2,260
- Time zone: UTC+5:30 (IST)
- 2011 census code: 551591

Waki is a village in the Palghar district of Maharashtra, India. It is located in the Dahanu taluka.

== Demographics ==
According to the 2011 census of India, Waki has 398 households. The effective literacy rate (i.e. the literacy rate of population excluding children aged 6 and below) is 51.01%.

Demographics (2011 Census)
	Total	Male	Female
Population	2260	1167	1093
Children aged below 6 years	333	177	156
Scheduled caste	5	3	2
Scheduled tribe	2217	1146	1071
Literates	983	604	379
Workers (all)	986	566	420
Main workers (total)	736	465	271
Main workers: Cultivators	26	23	3
Main workers: Agricultural labourers	304	125	179
Main workers: Household industry workers	137	104	33
Main workers: Other	269	213	56
Marginal workers (total)	250	101	149
Marginal workers: Cultivators	20	11	9
Marginal workers: Agricultural labourers	144	39	105
Marginal workers: Household industry workers	51	30	21
Marginal workers: Others	35	21	14
Non-workers	1274	601	673
