= TT Takemoto =

American film director

TT Takemoto is an American artist and associate professor of visual studies and dean of Humanities & Sciences at California College of the Arts in San Francisco. Takemoto's work explores issues of race and queer identity. They have presented work internationally, and received numerous grants for their work, notably from ART Matters, the James Irvine Foundation and the San Francisco Arts Commission. Their film Looking for Jiro received Best Experimental Film Jury Award at the Austin LGBT International Film Festival, and opened MIX 24: New York’s Queer Experimental Film Festival.

Takemoto also writes articles for Afterimage, Art Journal, GLQ, Performance Research, Radical Teacher, Theatre Survey, Women and Performance, and the anthology Thinking Through the Skin. Takemoto is a board member of the Queer Cultural Center and co-founder of Queer Conversations on Culture and the Arts.

== Education ==
Takemoto holds a BA from the University of California, Berkeley, an MFA from Rutgers State University of New Jersey, and an MA and PhD from the University of Rochester.

== Work ==
Takemoto's work examines issues of illness, race, queer identity, memory, and grief.

Starting in early 1990s Takemoto worked with Angela Ellsworth under the collective name Her/She Senses in part as a response to Ellsworth's lymphoma diagnoses and exploring "representations of women, particularly in relation to the body and race."

Takemoto's film "Looking for Jiro Onuma" explores same-sex intimacy and queer sexuality for Japanese Americans incarcerated by the US government during World War II. The film, in which Takemoto performs as Jiro, grew out of an archives project curated by E. G. Crichton, artist-in-residence at the Gay, Lesbian, Bisexual, Transsexual Historical Society of San Francisco. This project matched contemporary artists with historical persons whose papers were found in the archive. Takemoto was matched with Jiro Onuma, a gay bachelor and dandy in San Francisco until he was incarcerated in the Japanese American Internment Camp at Topaz, Utah, in 1942. The sculptural piece which resulted from their investigation of his archival box was "Gay Bachelor’s Japanese American Internment Survival Kit." This "survival kit" created objects for Jiro, body building literature and equipment.
