= Waki, Vikramgad =

Village in Maharashtra

Waki
- village
- Location in Maharashtra, India Waki (India)
- Coordinates: 19.7608113°N 73.1570876°E
- Country: India
- State: Maharashtra
- District: Palghar
- Taluka: Vikramgad
- Elevation: 71 m (233 ft)

Population (2011)
  - Total: 1,534
- Time zone: UTC+5:30 (IST)
- 2011 census code: 551801

Waki is a village in the Palghar district of Maharashtra, India. It is located in the Vikramgad taluka.

== Demographics ==
According to the 2011 census of India, Waki has 356 households. The effective literacy rate (i.e. the literacy rate of population excluding children aged 6 and below) is 69.47%.

Demographics (2011 Census)
	Total	Male	Female
Population	1534	763	771
Children aged below 6 years	224	118	106
Scheduled caste	0	0	0
Scheduled tribe	1503	750	753
Literates	910	512	398
Workers (all)	923	460	463
Main workers (total)	321	211	110
Main workers: Cultivators	160	88	72
Main workers: Agricultural labourers	119	91	28
Main workers: Household industry workers	2	1	1
Main workers: Other	40	31	9
Marginal workers (total)	602	249	353
Marginal workers: Cultivators	52	24	28
Marginal workers: Agricultural labourers	520	213	307
Marginal workers: Household industry workers	8	3	5
Marginal workers: Others	22	9	13
Non-workers	611	303	308
