= Kanze Nobumitsu =

Japanese noh playwright and actor

Kanze Kojiro Nobumitsu 観世 小次郎 信光 1435 or 1450 – July 7, 1516 was a Japanese noh playwright and secondary actor during the Muromachi Era, from the house of Kanze. He was the great nephew of Noh playwright Zeami Motokiyo and is considered one of the last important playwrights of the golden age of Noh. He was the author of around 30 plays.

Among his most famous plays is the play Rashōmon, which employed a pun by spelling the title of the Rajōmon gate using the kanji shō for "life" (羅生門) rather than the original jō for "castle." This reading has left its trace in the title of later stories named Rashōmon and the film of Akira Kurosawa.

== Selected plays ==
- Ataka
- Momijigari
- Dōjōji (uncertain attribution)
- Funa benkei
- Rashōmon
- Chōryō
- Yugyō yanagi
- Ryōko
- Kōtei
- Orochi
- Tama-no-i
- Kochō
