= Rashomon effect =

Unreliability of eyewitnesses

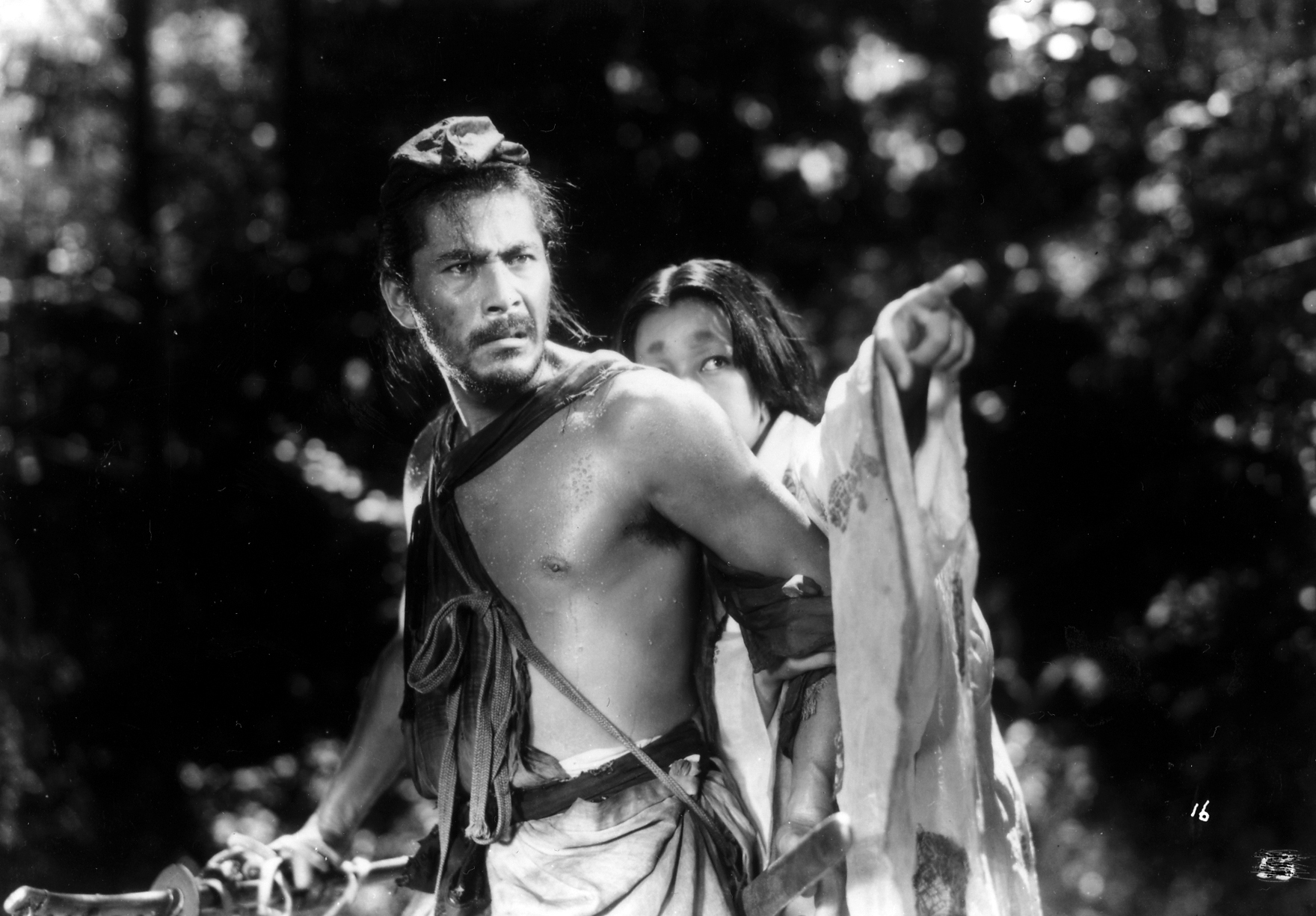
Tajōmaru the bandit and the wife of a samurai, two characters who offer different perspectives of events in the film Rashomon

The Rashomon effect is the phenomenon of the unreliability of eyewitnesses. The effect is named after Akira Kurosawa's 1950 Japanese film Rashomon, which itself is based on Ryunosuke Akutagawa's short story "In a Grove", in which a murder is described in four contradictory ways by four witnesses. It has been used as a storytelling and writing method in cinema in which an event is given contradictory interpretations or descriptions by the individuals involved, thereby providing different perspectives and points of view of the same incident.

== Discussion ==
The term addresses the motives, mechanism, and occurrences of the reporting on the circumstance and addresses contested interpretations of events, the existence of disagreements regarding the evidence of events, and subjectivity versus objectivity in human perception, memory, and reporting.

The Rashomon effect has been defined in a modern academic context as "the naming of an epistemological framework—or ways of thinking, knowing, and remembering—required for understanding complex and ambiguous situations".

The history of the term and its permutations in cinema, literature, legal studies, psychology, sociology, and history is the subject of a 2015 multi-author volume edited by Blair Davis, Robert Anderson and Jan Walls, titled Rashomon Effects: Kurosawa, Rashomon and their legacies.

Valerie Alia termed the same effect "The Rashomon Principle" and has used this variant extensively since the late 1970s, first publishing it in an essay on the politics of journalism in 1982. She developed the term in a 1997 essay "The Rashomon Principle: The Journalist as Ethnographer" and in her 2004 book, Media Ethics and Social Change.

A useful demonstration of this principle in scientific understanding can be found in Karl G. Heider's 1988 journal article on ethnography. Heider used the term to refer to the effect of the subjectivity of perception on recollection, by which observers of an event are able to produce substantially different but equally plausible accounts of it.

In the Queensland Supreme Court case of The Australian Institute for Progress Ltd v The Electoral Commission of Queensland & Ors (No 2), Applegarth J wrote that:

The Rashomon effect describes how parties describe an event in a different and contradictory manner, which reflects their subjective interpretation and self-interested advocacy, rather than an objective truth. The Rashomon effect is evident when the event is the outcome of litigation. One should not be surprised when both parties claim to have won the case.

The vagaries of memories and how they depend on one's own identity and interests is also a theme of the unfinished 1963 Polish film Passenger (based on a 1959 radio play), in which an Auschwitz survivor and guard differently recall events in that Nazi concentration camp.

== Works using the Rashomon effect ==
- 1922: In a Grove – the Japanese short story upon which the film Rashomon was partly based.
- 1942: Five Little Pigs – a detective novel by Agatha Christie, in which Hercule Poirot interviews five suspects involved in a murder a number of years after it took place and must deduce the murderer based solely on the inconsistencies in their accounts.
- 1950: Rashomon
- 1954: Andha Naal – an Indian Tamil-language film with thematic similarities to Rashomon.
- 1971: House Mother Normal – a novel by B. S. Johnson set in a nursing home, in which the same scenes are narrated through eight patients, each going through increasingly worse states of dementia, and the abusive head of the home.
- 1971: Four Times That Night – a film by Mario Bava
- 1988: The Thin Blue Line – a documentary about the 1976 murder of Dallas police Officer Robert W. Wood, in which different, conflicting and contradictory witness testimonies of the crime are reenacted
- 1990: "A Matter of Perspective" – an episode of Star Trek: The Next Generation where Commander Riker is accused of murder and faces an extradition hearing where everyone's version of what transpired is re-created in the holodeck.
- 1992: P.O.V. – an episode of Batman: The Animated Series where a rookie Officer named Wilkes, Officer Renee Montoya and Detective Harvey Bullock give conflicting testimony regarding a botched attempt to take down a smuggling ring.
- 1997: An Instance of the Fingerpost – a mystery novel featuring contradicting narrators.
- 1998: "Bad Blood" – an episode of The X-Files featuring differing retellings of an investigation into vampire activity.
- 1999: "The Can Opener" – an episode of Everybody Loves Raymond where married couple Raymond and Debra Barone each describe an argument about a can opener.
- 2003: Wonderland – a film about the Wonderland murders involving pornographic actor John Holmes in which he and other characters give conflicting recollections about events leading up to the murders and the crime itself.
- 2004: Virumaandi – the film's narrative presents two competing legal narratives, drawing comparisons to the Rashomon effect.
- 2005: "The Great Divide" – an episode of Avatar: The Last Airbender where two feuding tribes have a rivalry based on different perspectives on a single event.
- 2009: "Batman: Whatever Happened to the Caped Crusader?" – a comic book depicting the aftermath of Batman's apparent death through different character perspectives.
- 2010: “Who Got Dee Pregnant?” – an episode of It’s Always Sunny In Philadelphia in which the characters attempt to remember the events of Halloween, each misremembering the night differently as the result of alcohol.
- 2010: “The Rashomon Job” – an episode of Leverage in which the characters recount a single theft they each believe themselves to have committed on the same night.
- 2013: "The Ashtray" – an episode of How I Met Your Mother that shows the same event from multiple characters' perspectives.
- 2014: Ulidavaru Kandanthe – an Indian Kannada-language film about five characters telling their different perspectives on a person's murder.
- 2014: How It Went Down – a young adult fiction novel by Kekla Magoon that tells the story of a teen shooting from multiple perspectives.
- 2015: Talvar – an Indian Hindi-language film based on the 2008 Noida double murder case.
- 2016: The Handmaiden – a South Korean picture adapted from Fingersmith by Sarah Waters.
- 2017: Ankoku Joshi – based on the novel by Rikako Akiyoshi, follows members of a girls' literary club who each recount their version of events surrounding the death of their club president, accusing a different member of being responsible.
- 2018: "The Immortal Hulk" #3 – three different eyewitnesses recount The Hulk's battle with Hotshot through radically different perspectives, each illustrated by a different artist.
- 2021: The Last Duel – three main characters narrating the rape of a knight's wife in three chapters.
- 2022: Vadhandhi: The Fable of Velonie – an Indian Prime Video web series.
- 2022–23: The Afterparty – an American comedy murder mystery anthology television series. Each episode revisits the central mystery of the season through a different character’s retelling and narrative lens.
- 2023: Monster – a Japanese film directed by Hirokazu Kore-eda following a mother's confrontation with school officials after noticing changes in her son's behaviour.
- 2024: Monsters: The Lyle and Erik Menendez Story – a Netflix limited series about the Menendez brothers.
- 2026: The Odyssey – a film directed by Christopher Nolan based on epic poem Odyssey.

== See also ==
- Unreliable narrator
- Blind men and an elephant
- Remakes of films by Akira Kurosawa – includes explicit remakes of Rashomon
