= Teikoku Bungaku =

Japanese literary magazine

Teikoku Bungaku (帝国文学, teikoku empire + bungaku literature) was a literature magazine from 1895 to 1920 contributed by Japanese writers, Inoue Tetsujiro, Ueda Kazutoshi, Takayama Chogyu and Ueda Bin. With a focus on asserting the individuality of Japanese literature, the magazine often contrasted Japanese and global literature by covering writers such as Maurice Maeterlinck, George Bernard Shaw and Friedrich Nietzsche. The magazine was published by Tokyo Imperial University.

== See also ==
- Japanese literature
