= Rajōmon =

Gate built at the ancient Japanese cities of Heijō-kyō (Nara) and Heian-kyō (Kyoto)

Coordinates: 34°58′45.70″N 135°44′33.40″E

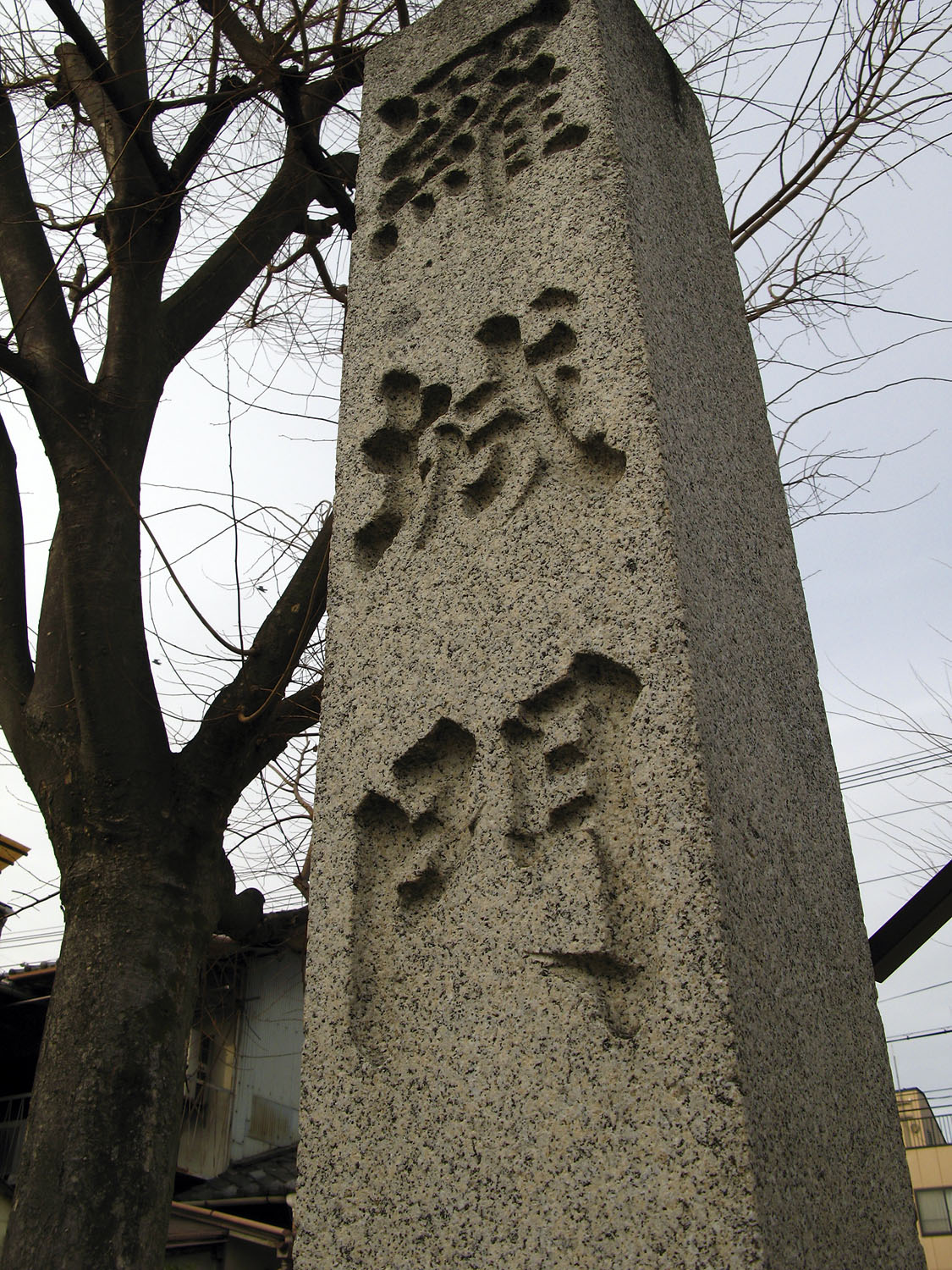
Marker at site of Rashōmon, Kyoto

Rajōmon (羅城門), also called Rashōmon (羅生門), was the gate built at the southern end of the monumental Suzaku Avenue in the ancient Japanese cities of Heijō-kyō (Nara) and Heian-kyō (Kyoto), in accordance with the Chinese grid-patterned city layout. At the other far northend of Suzaku Avenue, one would reach the Suzakumon Gate, the main entrance to the palace zone.

== Name ==
The gate's name in modern Japanese is Rajōmon. Rajō (羅城) refers to city walls and mon (門) means "gate", so Rajōmon signifies the main city gate. This gate was originally known as Raseimon or Raiseimon, using alternate readings for the kanji in the name. The name Rashōmon, using the kanji 羅生門 (which can also be read Raseimon), was popularized by a noh play Rashōmon (c.1420) written by Kanze Nobumitsu (1435–1516).

The modern name, Rajōmon, uses the original kanji (羅城門 rather than 羅生門) and employs the more common reading for the second character (jō instead of sei).

== Rashōmon in Kyoto (Heian-kyō) ==
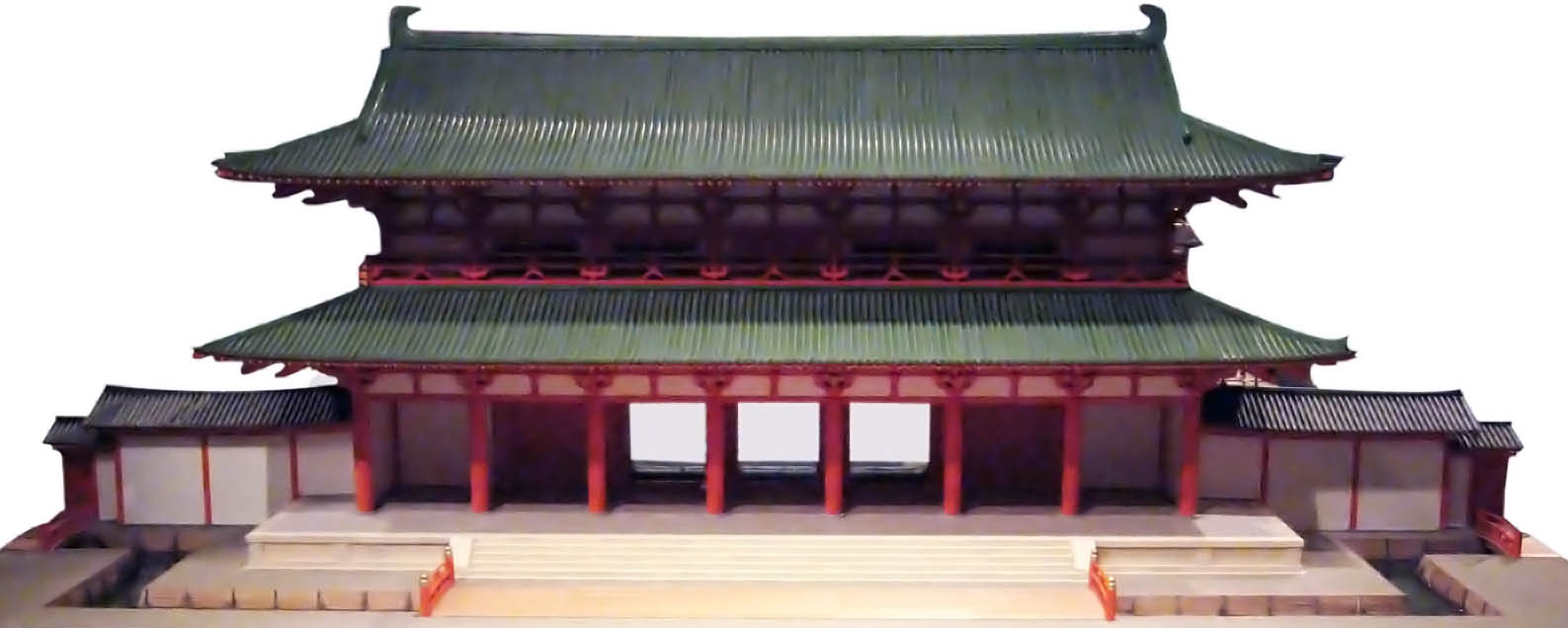
Possible appearance of the gate, miniature model

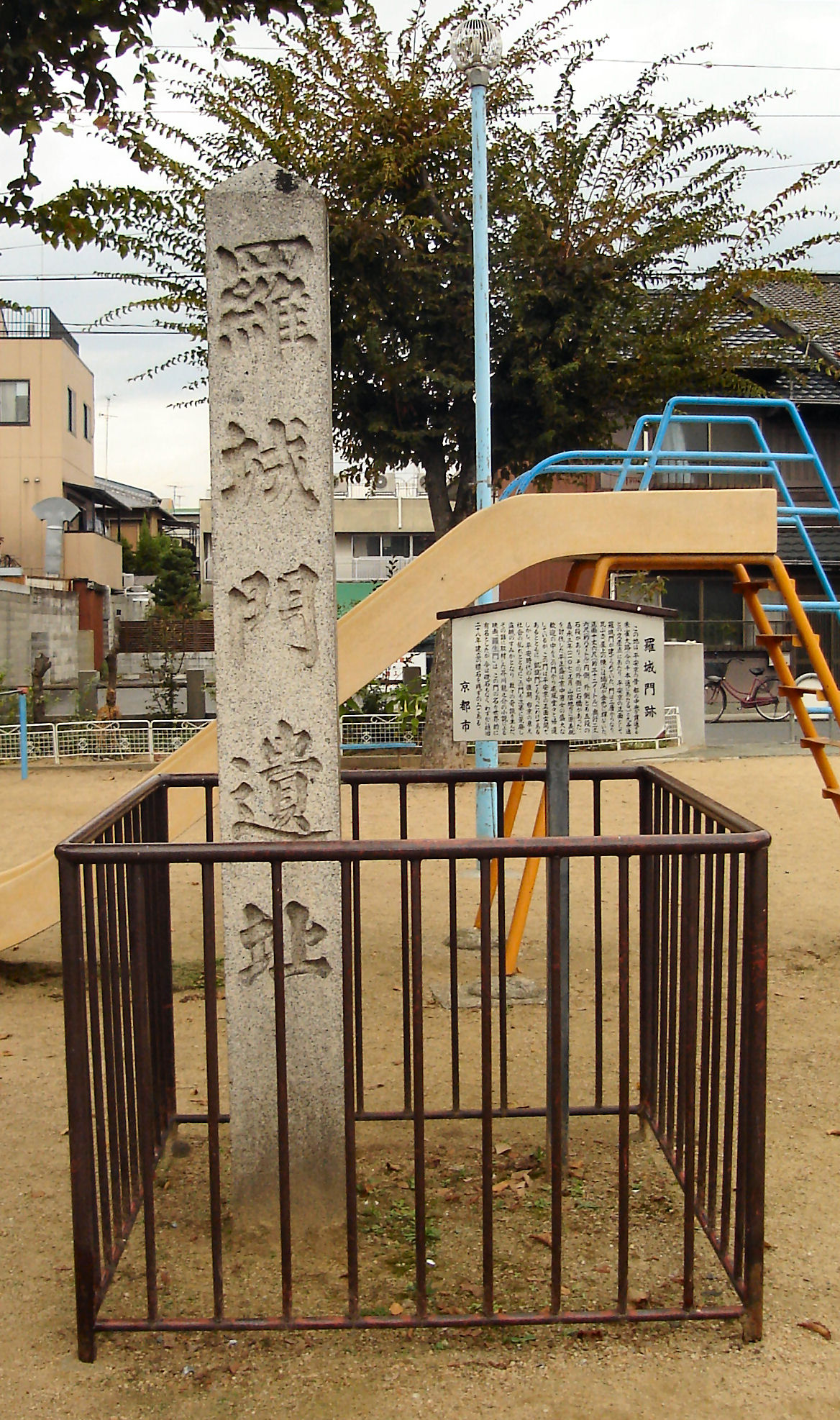
Another view of the Rashōmon marker, with a playground in the background

The Rashōmon in Kyoto was the grander of the two city gates built during the Heian period (794–1185). Built in 789, it was 106 feet (32 m) wide by 26 feet (7.9 m) high, with a 75-foot (23 m) stone wall and topped by a ridge-pole. By the 12th century, it had fallen into disrepair and become an unsavory place, with a reputation as a hideout for thieves and other such characters. People would abandon corpses and unwanted babies at the gate.

The ruined gate is the central setting—and provides the title—for Ryūnosuke Akutagawa's short story "Rashōmon," and hence for Akira Kurosawa's 1950 film of the same name. Akutagawa's use of the gate was deliberately symbolic, with the gate's ruined state representing the moral and physical decay of Japanese civilization and culture. According to one legend, it was inhabited by the demon Ibaraki Dōji.

Not one foundation stone of the gate remains today. A stone pillar marks the place where it once stood, just northeast of the intersection of Kujō Street and Senbon Street or Senbon Avenue (千本通, Senbon Dōri) (formerly Suzaku Street), a short walk west from the Heian-period temple Tō-ji. This stretch of Kujō is designated Route 171 and is just west of Route 1. A wooden sign written in Japanese and English explains the history and significance of the gate. The site is behind an undistinguished shop on Kujō Street, and sits directly next to a small playground. Though a nearby bus stop is named Rajōmon, those unfamiliar with the area are likely to miss the Rashōmon site.

== Rajōmon in Nara (Heijo-kyō) ==
The Rajōmon in Nara stood about 4 km south of the Suzakumon of Heijō Palace. Their foundation stones were discovered in the excavations conducted between 1969 and 1972. From the remaining foundations, the width of the gate is estimated to have been 41.5 m.

Some of the foundation stones were reused in the 16th century by Toyotomi Hidenaga, who was expanding his castle in Kōriyama.

== Presence in Fujiwara-kyō ==
As of 2007, the southern end of Suzaku Avenue and the possible remainder of the equivalent gate in Fujiwara-kyō (Kashihara) are yet to be discovered, with a theory that the Suzaku-oji and Rajomon on the south side of the Asuka River were not developed in the capital due to lack of archaeological evidence and the presence of a number of large Buddhist temples in that area.

== See also ==
- Suzakumon, the southern gate on ancient palace grounds
