= Rashomon =

1950 film by Akira Kurosawa

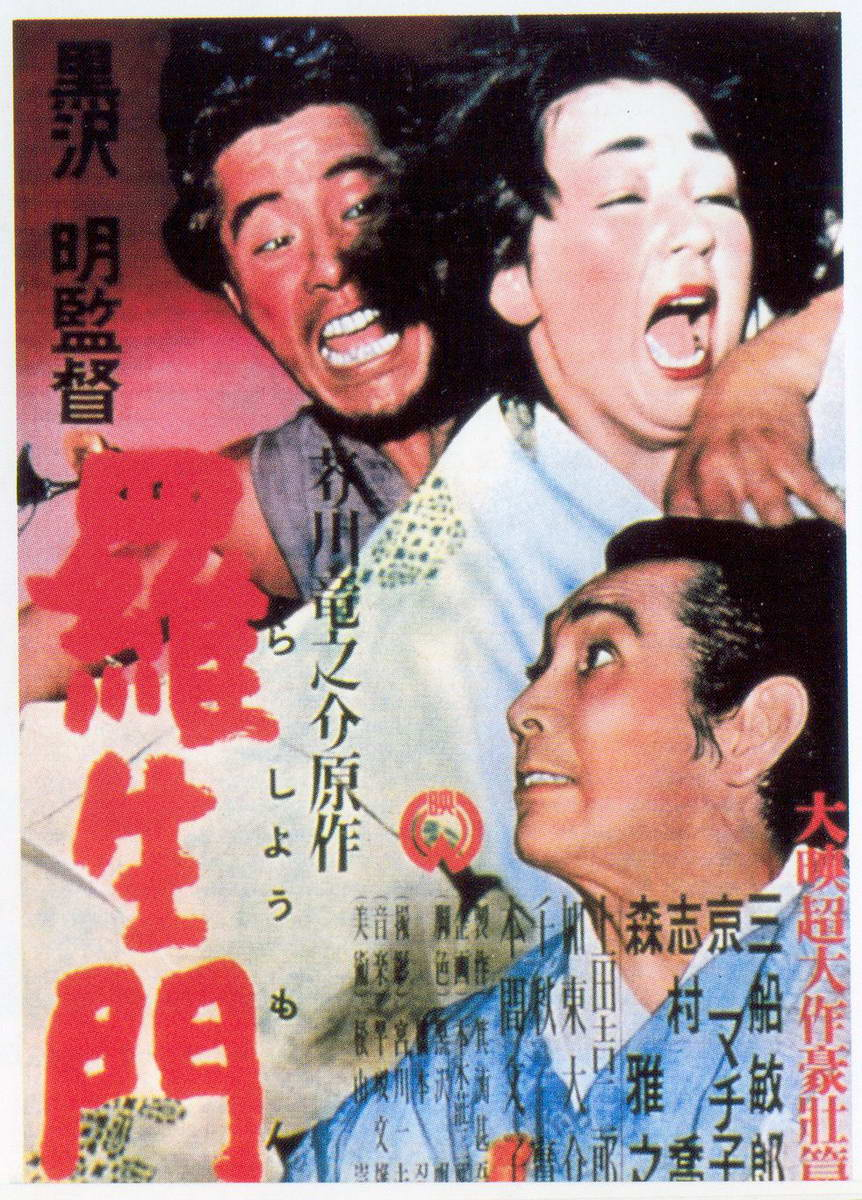
- Theatrical release poster
- Directed by: Akira Kurosawa
- Screenplay by: Akira Kurosawa; Shinobu Hashimoto
- Based on: "In a Grove" by Ryūnosuke Akutagawa
- Produced by: Jingo Minoura
- Starring: Toshiro Mifune; Masayuki Mori; Machiko Kyō; Takashi Shimura; Minoru Chiaki
- Cinematography: Kazuo Miyagawa
- Edited by: Shigeo Nishida
- Music by: Fumio Hayasaka
- Production company: Daiei Film
- Distributed by: Daiei
- Release dates: August 25, 1950 (Imperial Theatre); August 26, 1950 (Japan)
- Running time: 88 minutes
- Country: Japan
- Language: Japanese
- Budget: ¥15–20 million ($42,000‑55,000)
- Box office: $1 million (Note: This figure represents the original box office gross of $800,000 (¥300 million) and grosses from subsequent theatrical re-releases.)

Rashomon (Japanese: 羅生門, Hepburn: Rashōmon) (Note: The Japanese title is derived from the Rajōmon gate built in Kyoto during the Heian period and has no explicit English translation. However, Jan Walls claimed that it means "web life gate" or "net life gate", with "web life" referring to dharma. Upon its initial American release, some Western sources erroneously cited the translation of the film's title as "In the Forest".) is a 1950 Japanese jidaigeki (period drama) psychological thriller film directed by Akira Kurosawa from a screenplay he co-wrote with Shinobu Hashimoto. Starring Toshiro Mifune, Machiko Kyō, Masayuki Mori, and Takashi Shimura, it follows various people who describe how a samurai was murdered in a forest. The plot and characters are based upon Ryūnosuke Akutagawa's short story "In a Grove", with the title and framing story taken from Akutagawa's "Rashōmon". Every element is largely identical, from the murdered samurai speaking through a Shinto psychic to the bandit in the forest, the monk, the assault of the wife, and the dishonest retelling of the events in which everyone shows their ideal self by lying.

Production began in 1948 at Kurosawa's regular production firm Toho but was canceled as it was viewed as a financial risk. Two years later, Sōjirō Motoki pitched Rashomon to Daiei Film upon the completion of Kurosawa's Scandal. Daiei initially turned it down but eventually agreed to produce and distribute the film. Principal photography lasted from July 7 to August 17, 1950, taking place primarily in Kyoto on an estimated ¥15–20 million budget. When creating the film's visual style, Kurosawa and cinematographer Kazuo Miyagawa experimented with various methods such as pointing the camera at the sun, which was considered taboo. Post-production took only one week.

Rashomon premiered at the Imperial Theatre on August 25, 1950, and was distributed throughout Japan the following day, to moderate commercial success, becoming Daiei's fourth highest-grossing film of 1950. Japanese critics praised the experimental direction and cinematography but criticized its adapting of Akutagawa's story and complexity. Upon winning the Golden Lion at the 12th Venice International Film Festival, Rashomon became the first Japanese film to attain significant international reception, garnering critical acclaim and earning roughly $800,000 abroad. It later won Best Foreign Language Film at the 24th Academy Awards, (Note: The Academy of Motion Picture Arts and Sciences presented the category as an Honorary Award until 1956.) and was nominated for Best Film at the 6th British Academy Film Awards.

Rashomon is now considered one of the greatest films ever made and among the most influential movies from the 20th century. It pioneered the Rashomon effect, a plot device that involves various characters providing subjective, alternative, and contradictory versions of the same incident. In 1999, critic Andrew Johnston asserted that "the film's title has become synonymous with its chief narrative conceit".

== Plot ==
In Heian-era Kyoto, a woodcutter and a Buddhist monk, taking shelter from a downpour under the Rashōmon gate, have just returned from giving evidence in a trial about the murder of a samurai, and are baffled at the conflicting stories they have heard. They are joined by a commoner, who asks to hear what happened. The film intercuts the discussions of the three men at the gate with flashbacks of witness testimonies and reconstructions of the events described.

The woodcutter gives evidence that he had found the body of the samurai three days earlier, alongside the man's cap, his wife's hat, pieces of rope, and an amulet. He had been killed with a sword. The monk states that he had seen the samurai on the day of the murder traveling on foot, accompanying his wife on horseback.

A policeman presents the main suspect, a captured bandit named Tajōmaru. In Tajōmaru's version of events, he follows the couple after seeing them in the woods, and lures the samurai away with the prospect of buried treasure. Tying the man up, he returns to rape his wife, who tries to defend herself with a dagger, but ultimately submits. Ashamed of her dishonor, the wife asks Tajōmaru to fight with her husband, saying she will belong to the man who wins. Tajōmaru agrees and kills the samurai (supposedly in an honorable way), only to find that the wife has fled.

The wife, having been found by the police, tells a different story. In her version, Tajōmaru leaves immediately after raping her. She frees her husband from his bonds, but he stares at her with contempt and loathing. The wife approaches him with her dagger, and then faints. She awakens to find her husband dead, with the dagger in his chest. In shock, she wanders through the forest until coming upon a pond in which she unsuccessfully tries to drown herself.

The dead samurai's testimony is heard through a Shinto medium. In his version, after raping the wife, Tajōmaru asks her to marry him. She accepts, but asks Tajōmaru to kill her husband first. Shocked at her fickleness, Tajōmaru gives the samurai the choice to let her go or have her killed. The wife breaks free and flees, with Tajōmaru unsuccessfully giving chase. Some hours later, Tajōmaru returns and releases the samurai, who then kills himself with his wife's dagger. Later, he feels someone remove the dagger from his chest, but cannot tell who.

Back at the Rashōmon gate, the woodcutter proclaims all three stories to be false, and repeats that the samurai was killed with a sword, not a dagger. Pressed by the commoner, the woodcutter admits that he had actually seen the murder but says that he lied to avoid getting into trouble. In the woodcutter's telling, Tajōmaru promises to marry the wife after raping her. She breaks free and releases her husband, expecting him to kill the assailant. However, the samurai refuses to fight, unwilling to risk his life for a ruined woman. Tajōmaru retracts his promise. The wife taunts them both, demanding that they fight for her. They fight unwillingly and clumsily. When the samurai is disarmed and begs for his life, Tajōmaru kills him. The wife flees, and Tajōmaru steals the samurai's sword and limps away.

The woodcutter, the monk, and the commoner are interrupted by the sound of a crying baby. They find a child abandoned at the gate along with a kimono and an amulet. The commoner attempts to steal the items, and the woodcutter rebukes him. The commoner deduces that the woodcutter had lied not because he feared getting into trouble, but because he had stolen the wife's dagger and needed to avoid it appearing in his evidence. The commoner leaves, mocking the others.

The monk attempts to soothe the baby. Having lost his faith in humanity after the events of the trial, when the woodcutter attempts to take the child, he recoils. The woodcutter explains that he intends to raise the child along with his own children, and the monk softens, his faith restored. As the woodcutter leaves with the child in his arms, the rain stops.

== Cast ==
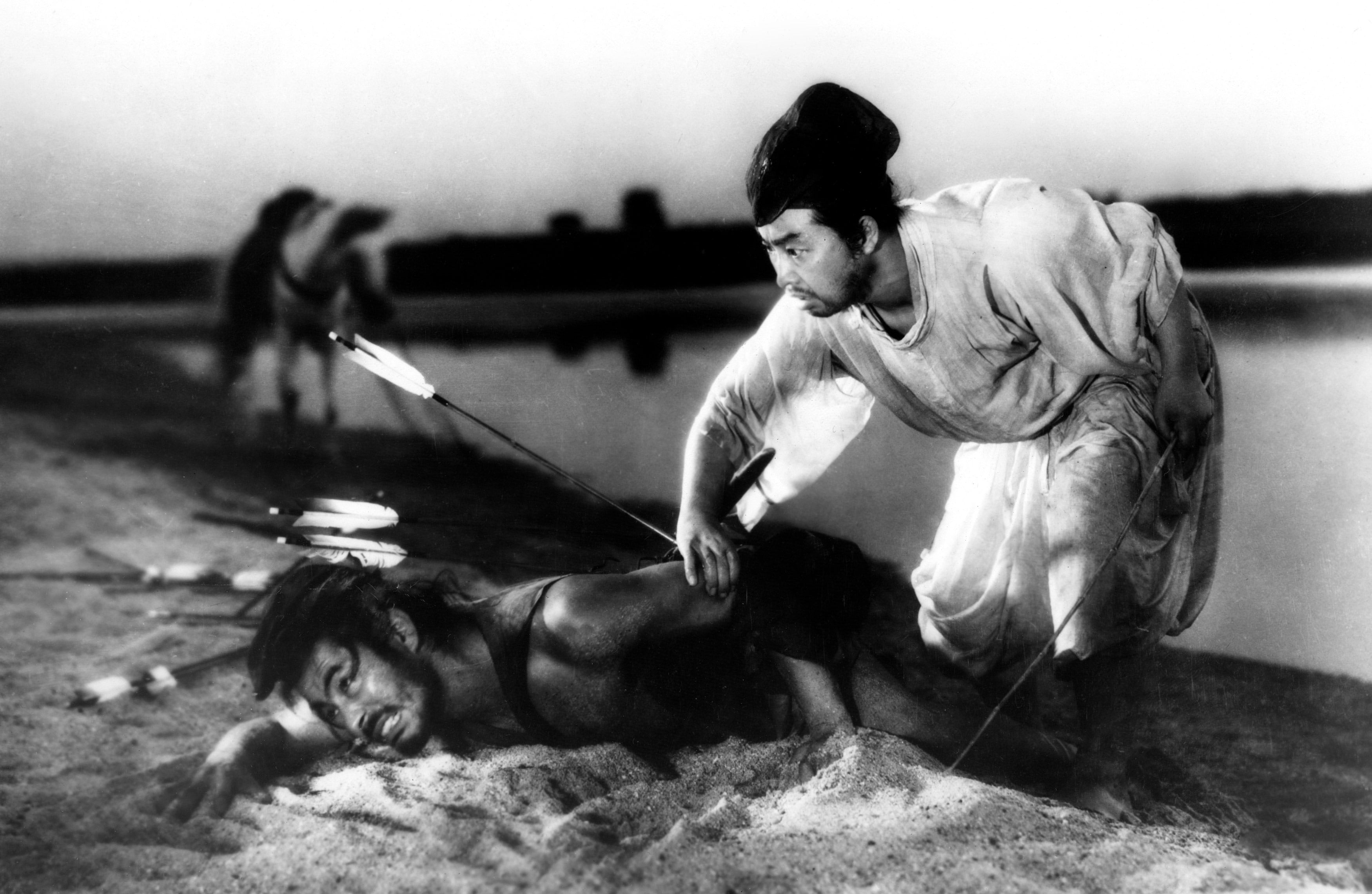
Press photo of Toshiro Mifune and Daisuke Katō

- Toshiro Mifune as Tajōmaru, the bandit
- Masayuki Mori as Takehiro Kanazawa, the samurai
- Machiko Kyō as Masago, Kanazawa's wife
- Takashi Shimura as the woodcutter
- Minoru Chiaki as the monk
- Kichijirō Ueda as the commoner
- Noriko Honma as the miko
- Daisuke Katō as the policeman

== Production ==
=== Development ===
According to Donald Richie, Akira Kurosawa began developing the film circa 1948, and both Kurosawa's regular production studio Toho and its financing company, Toyoko Company, refused to produce the film, with the latter fearing it would be a precarious production. Following the completion of Scandal, Sōjirō Motoki offered the script to Daiei who also initially rejected it.

Regarding Rashomon, Kurosawa said:

I like silent pictures and I always have... I wanted to restore some of this beauty. I thought of it, I remember in this way: one of the techniques of modern art is simplification, and that I must therefore simplify this film."

As with most films produced in post-war Japan, reports on the budget of Rashomon are scarce and differ. In 1952, Jitsugyo no Nihon Sha said that the film's production cost was ¥20 million, and suggested that advertising and other expenses brought the overall budget to ¥35 million. The following year, the National Board of Review reported that the $85,000 spent on Kurosawa's Ikiru (1952) was over twice the budget of Rashomon. According to the UNESCO in 1971, Rashomon had a budget of ¥15 million or $42,000. Reports on the budget in Western currency vary: The Guinness Book of Movie Facts and Feats cited it as $40,000, The New York Times and Stuart Galbraith IV noted a reputed $140,000 figure, and a handful of other sources have claimed that it cost as high as $250,000. Jasper Sharp disputed the latter number in an article for the BBC, since it would have been equal to ¥90 million at the time of the film's production. He added that it "seems highly unlikely given that the 125 million yen, approximately $350,000, that Kurosawa subsequently spent on Seven Samurai four years later made this film by far the most expensive domestic production up to this point".

=== Writing ===
Kurosawa wrote the screenplay while staying at a ryokan in Atami with his friend Ishirō Honda, who was scripting The Blue Pearl (1951). The pair regularly commenced writing their respective films at 9:00 a.m. and would give feedback on each other's work after each completed roughly twenty pages. According to Honda, Kurosawa soon refused to read The Blue Pearl after a couple of days but "of course, he still made me read his".

Assistant directors Tai Kato, Mitsuo Wakasugi and Tokuzō Tanaka did not understand the script, and asked Kurosawa to explain it for them. Kato, however, was unconvinced, and he clashed with Kurosawa on set, who put him in charge of creating the trailer for the movie.

=== Casting ===
Kurosawa had initially wanted the cast of eight to consist entirely of previous collaborators, specifically counseling Toshiro Mifune and Takashi Shimura. He also suggested that Setsuko Hara—who had played the lead in No Regrets for Our Youth (1946)—portray the wife, but she was not cast since her brother-in-law, filmmaker Hisatora Kumagai, was against it; Hara would subsequently appear in Kurosawa's next film, The Idiot (1951). Daiei executives then recommended Machiko Kyō, believing she would make the film easier to market. Kurosawa agreed to cast her upon seeing her show enthusiasm for the project by shaving her eyebrows before going for a make-up test.

When Kurosawa shot Rashomon, the actors and the staff lived together, a system Kurosawa found beneficial. He recalls:

We were a very small group and it was as though I was directing Rashomon every minute of the day and night. At times like this, you can talk everything over and get very close indeed.

=== Filming ===
Due to its small budget the film had only three sets: the gate; the forest scene; and the police courtyard. Filming began on 7 July 1950 and ended on 17 August. After a week's work on post-production, it was released in Tokyo on 25 August. The rain in the scenes at the gate had to be tinted with black ink because camera lenses could not capture the water pumped through the hoses.

=== Cinematography ===
The film's cinematography was handled by Kazuo Miyagawa, who would later work with Kurosawa on Yojimbo. Having previously shot movies in low-key tones, Miyagawa was interested in shooting Rashomon in high-key tones by toning down the grays. Miyagawa utilized Fujifilm stock, which was considered inferior to Kodak film stock, but it also produced the strong contrasts that he and Kurosawa wanted. In order to obtain sharp images, lenses that ranged from 32mm to 75mm were used and mounted on Miyagawa's Mitchell NC camera.

For the forest sequences where electrical lights could not be utilized, Miyagawa had eight mirrors to reflect natural sunlight. A baseball net was stretched several meters above the ground where Miyagawa put leaves and branches on it, and were adjusted with a long bamboo pole, so that the shadows of the leaves fell in the faces of the actors.

=== Lighting ===
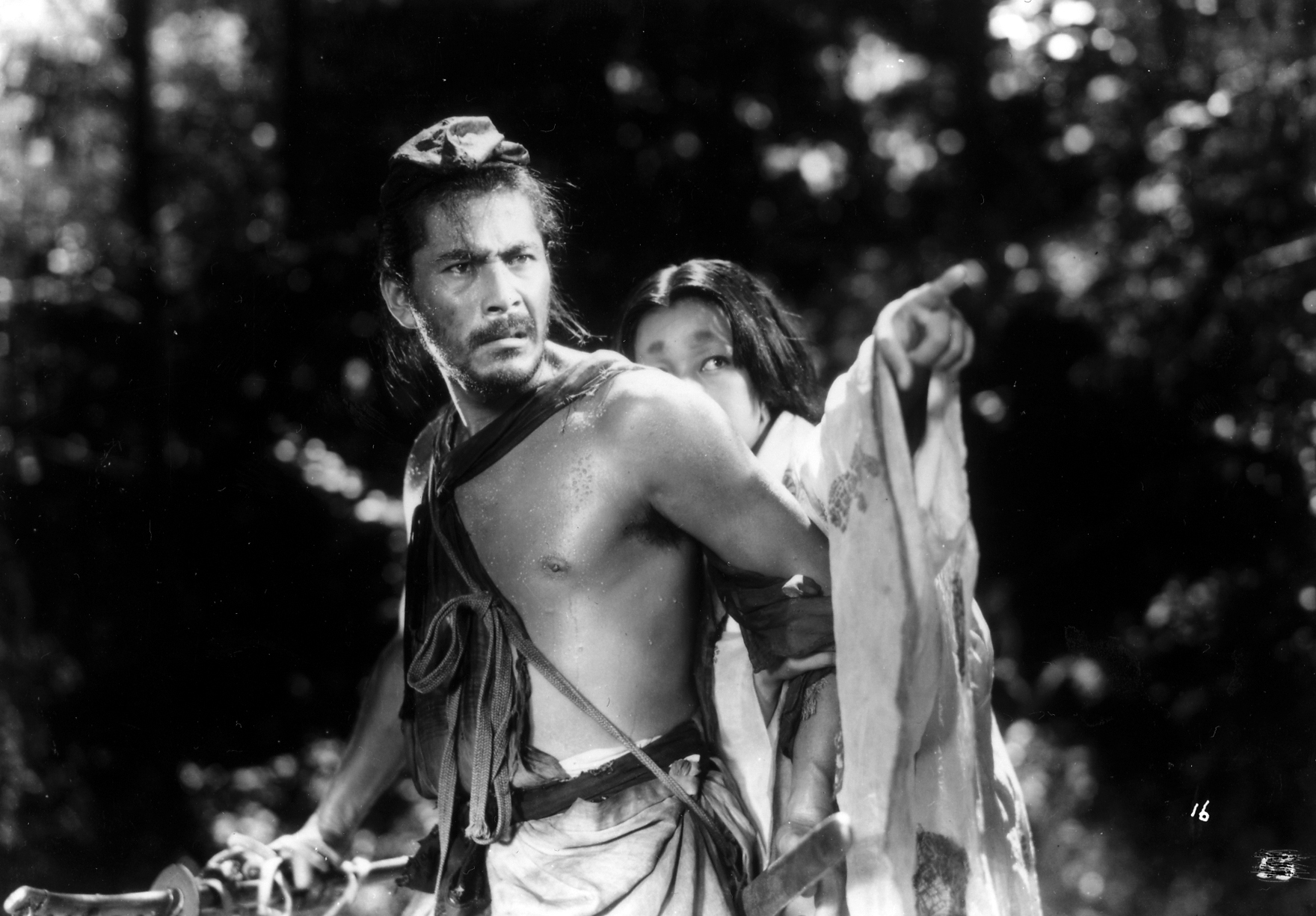
The bandit and the wife, in the dappled light of the forest

Robert Altman compliments Kurosawa's use of "dappled" light throughout the film, which gives the characters and settings further ambiguity. In his essay "Rashomon", Tadao Sato suggests that the film (unusually) uses sunlight to symbolize evil and sin in the film, arguing that the wife gives in to the bandit's desires when she sees the sun.

Professor Keiko I. McDonald opposes Sato's idea in her essay "The Dialectic of Light and Darkness in Kurosawa's Rashomon." McDonald says the film conventionally uses light to symbolize "good" or "reason" and darkness to symbolize "bad" or "impulse". She interprets the scene mentioned by Sato differently, pointing out that the wife gives herself to the bandit when the sun slowly fades out. McDonald also reveals that Kurosawa was waiting for a big cloud to appear over Rashomon gate to shoot the final scene in which the woodcutter takes the abandoned baby home; Kurosawa wanted to show that there might be another dark rain any time soon, even though the sky is clear at this moment. McDonald regards it as unfortunate that the final scene appears optimistic because it was too sunny and clear to produce the effects of an overcast sky.

=== Post-production ===
Stanley Kauffmann writes in The Impact of Rashomon that Kurosawa often shot a scene with several cameras at the same time, so that he could "cut the film freely and splice together the pieces which have caught the action forcefully as if flying from one piece to another." Despite this, he also used short shots edited together that trick the audience into seeing one shot; Donald Richie says in his essay that "there are 407 separate shots in the body of the film ... This is more than twice the number in the usual film, and yet these shots never call attention to themselves."

Due to setbacks and some lost audio, Mifune returned to the studio after filming to record another line. Recording engineer Iwao Ōtani added it to the film along with the music, using a different microphone.

The film was scored by Fumio Hayasaka, who is among the most respected of Japanese composers. At the director's request, he scored a bolero for the woman's story.

== Allegorical and symbolic content ==
The film depicts the rape of a woman and the murder of her samurai husband through the widely differing accounts of four witnesses, including the bandit-rapist, the wife, the dead man (speaking through a medium), and lastly the woodcutter, the one witness who seems the most objective and least biased. The stories are mutually contradictory and even the final version may be seen as motivated by factors of ego and saving face. The actors kept approaching Kurosawa wanting to know the truth, and he claimed the point of the film was to be an exploration of multiple realities rather than an exposition of a particular truth. Later film and television use of the "Rashomon effect" focuses on revealing "the truth" in a now conventional technique that presents the final version of a story as the truth, an approach that only matches Kurosawa's film on the surface.

Due to its emphasis on the subjectivity of truth and the uncertainty of factual accuracy, Rashomon has been read by some as an allegory of the defeat of Japan at the end of World War II. James F. Davidson's article, "Memory of Defeat in Japan: A Reappraisal of Rashomon" in the December 1954 issue of the Antioch Review, is an early analysis of the World War II defeat elements. Another allegorical interpretation of the film is mentioned briefly in a 1995 article, "Japan: An Ambivalent Nation, an Ambivalent Cinema" by David M. Desser. Here, the film is seen as an allegory of the atomic bomb and Japanese defeat. It also briefly mentions James Goodwin's view on the influence of post-war events on the film. However, the film's source material, "In a Grove", was published in 1922, so any postwar allegory would have resulted from Kurosawa's additions rather than the story about the conflicting accounts. Historian and critic David Conrad has noted that the use of rape as a plot point came at a time when American occupation authorities had recently stopped censoring Japanese media and belated accounts of rapes by occupation troops began to appear in Japanese newspapers. Moreover, Kurosawa and other filmmakers were not allowed to make jidaigeki during the early part of the occupation, so setting a film in the distant past was a way to reassert domestic control over cinema.

== Release ==
=== Box office ===
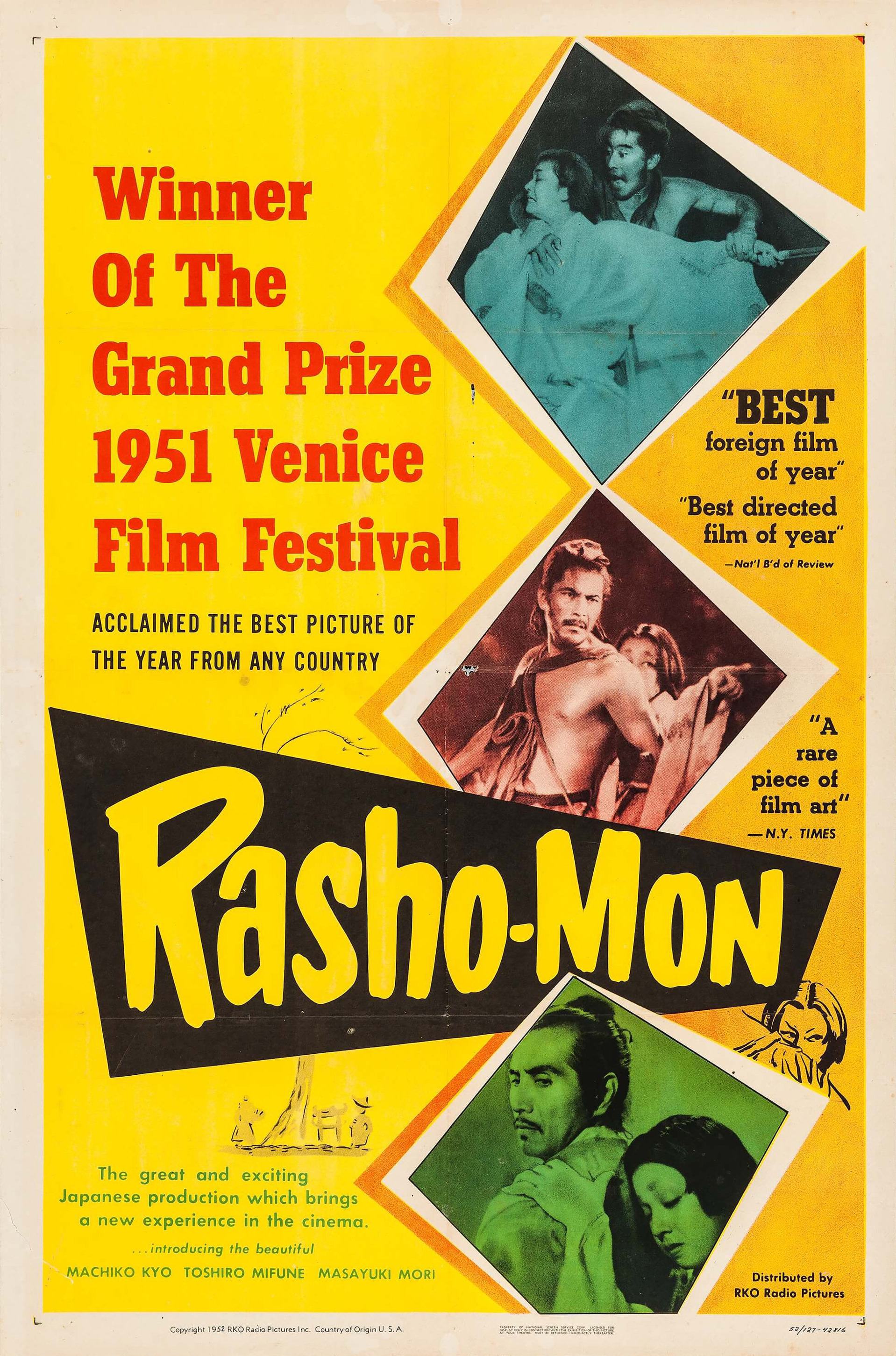
US release poster for Rashomon

The premiere of Rashomon took place at the Imperial Theatre on August 25, 1950, in Tokyo, and was distributed nationwide by Daiei the next day. It was an instant box office success, leading several theaters to continue to play it for two or three weeks rather than a Japanese film's regular one-week theatrical run. Jiji Press reported that the film was Daiei's third highest-grossing film released between September 1949 and August 1950, having earned over ¥10 million. In general, the film was Daiei's fourth-highest-grossing film of 1950. Donald Richie claimed that it was also one of the top ten highest-earning films in Japan that year.

The film later became Kurosawa's first major international hit. It was released theatrically in the United States by RKO Radio Pictures on December 26, 1951, in both subtitled and dubbed versions. By June 1952, the film had grossed $700,000 overseas. Later that same year, Scene reported that the film had earned $800,000 (¥300 million) overseas, which was $200,000 more than what all of the previous Japanese movies released overseas had collectively grossed outside of Japan within the past four years. In 1954, Kinema Junpo stated that it grossed $500,000 in 1951, and reached roughly $800,000 shortly thereafter. According to the National Board of Review, Rashomon exceeded $300,000 in the United States alone by 1955.

In 2002, the film grossed $46,808 in the US, with an additional earned $96,568 during 2009 to 2010, for a combined $143,376 in the United States between 2002 and 2010. In Europe, the film sold 365,293 tickets in France and Spain, and 8,292 tickets in other European countries between 1996 and 2020, for a combined total of at least 373,585 tickets sold in Europe.

=== Venice Film Festival screening ===
Japanese film companies had no interest in international festivals and were reluctant to submit the movie because paying for printing and creating subtitles was considered a waste of money. The film was subsequently screened at the 1951 Venice Film Festival at the behest of Italifilm president Giuliana Stramigioli, who had recommended it to the Italian film promotion agency Unitalia Film seeking a Japanese film to screen at the festival. In 1953, Stramigioli explained her reasoning behind submitting the film:

I was shocked by Rashomon. Regardless of whether it would win an award, the first condition is that it would generate a great deal of buzz. In that sense, Rashomon is a very distinctive film, and because it is so Japanese, I thought it was entirely appropriate. I also thought that the way it handled the theme, the way it was portrayed, and the spirit and humanity that flowed through the film were all excellent.

However, Daiei and other Japanese corporations disagreed with the choice of Kurosawa's work because it was "not [representative enough] of the Japanese movie industry" and felt that a work of Yasujirō Ozu would have been more illustrative of excellence in Japanese cinema. Despite these reservations, the film was screened at the festival.

Before it was screened at the Venice festival, the film initially drew little attention and had low expectations at the festival, as Japanese cinema was not yet taken seriously in the West at the time. But once it had been screened, Rashomon drew an overwhelmingly positive response from festival audiences, praising its originality and techniques while making many question the nature of truth. The film won both the Italian Critics Award and the Golden Lion award—introducing Western audiences, including Western directors, more noticeably to both Kurosawa's films and techniques, such as shooting directly into the sun and using mirrors to reflect sunlight onto the actor's faces.

=== Home media ===
Kadokawa released Rashomon on DVD in May 2008 and Blu-ray in February 2009. The Criterion Collection later issued a Blu-ray and DVD edition of the film based on the 2008 restoration, accompanied by a number of additional features.

== Reception ==
=== Critical response ===
==== Japanese reviews ====
Rashomon was met with polarized reviews from Japanese critics upon its release. When it received positive responses in the West, Japanese critics were baffled: some decided that it was only admired there because it was "exotic"; others thought that it succeeded because it was more "Western" than most Japanese films.

Tadashi Iijima criticized "its insufficient plan for visualizing the style of the original stories". Tatsuhiko Shigeno of Kinema Junpo opposed Mifune's extensive dialogue as unfitting for the role of a bandit. Akira Iwasaki later cited how he and his contemporaries were "impressed by the boldness and excellence of director Akira Kurosawa's experimental approach within this movie, but couldn't help but notice that there was some confusion in its expression" adding that "I found it difficult to resonate with the agnostic philosophy that the film contains wholeheartedly".

In a collection of interpretations of Rashomon, Donald Richie writes that "the confines of 'Japanese' thought could not contain the director, who thereby joined the world at large". Regarding the film's Japanese reception, Kurosawa remarked:

"Japanese are terribly critical of Japanese films, so it is not too surprising that a foreigner should have been responsible for my [film] being sent to Venice. It was the same way with Japanese woodcuts; it was the foreigners who first appreciated them. We Japanese think too little of our own things. Actually, Rashomon wasn't all that good, I don't think. Yet when people have said to me that its reception was just a stroke of luck, a fluke, I have answered by saying that they only say these things because the film is, after all, Japanese, and then I wonder: Why do we all think so little of our own things? Why don’t we stand up for our films? What are we so afraid of?"

==== International reviews ====
Rashomon received acclaim from contempary Western critics.

Ed Sullivan gave the film a positive review in Hollywood Citizen-News, calling it "an exciting evening, because the direction, the photography and the performances will jar open your eyes." He praised Akutagawa's original plot, Kurosawa's impactful direction and screenplay, Mifune's "magnificent" villainous performance, and Miyagawa's "spellbinding" cinematography that achieves "visual dimensions that I've never seen in Hollywood photography" such as being "shot through a relentless rainstorm that heightens the mood of the somber drama." Meanwhile, Bosley Crowther from The New York Times gave it a perfect score; stating, "Much of the power of the picture—and it unquestionably has hypnotic power—derives from the brilliance with which the camera of Director Akira Kurosawa has been used. The photography is excellent and the flow of images is expressive beyond words."

=== Boléro controversy ===
The usage of a musical composition similar to Maurice Ravel's Boléro provoked wide controversy, especially in Western countries. Some accused Hayasaka of music plagiarism, including Boléro's publisher, who sent him a letter of protest after the film's French release.

In late 1950, the film was vetoed from Motion Picture Producers Association of Japan's selection list for the 4th Cannes Film Festival over concerns about facing copyright issues for the composition.

=== Masaichi Nagata's response ===
Daiei's president, Masaichi Nagata, was initially critical of the film. Assistant director Tokuzō Tanaka said that Nagata broke the abrupt few minutes of silence following its preview screening at the company's headquarters in Kyōbashi by saying: "I don't really get it, but it's a noble photograph." According to Kurosawa, Nagata had called Rashomon "incomprehensible" and loathed it so much that he ended up demoting its producer.

Nagata later embraced Rashomon upon it receiving numerous awards and international success. He kept the original Golden Lion that the film received in his office, and had replicas handed to Kurosawa and others who worked on the film. His constant reference to its accomplishments as if he was responsible for the film himself was stated by many.

In 1992, Kurosawa remarked that Nagata had cited Rashomon's cinematographic feats in an interview included for the film's first television broadcast without mentioning the names of its director or cinematographer. He reflected being disgusted by the company's president taking credit for the film's achievements: "Watching that television interview, I had the feeling that I was back in the world of Rashomon all over again. It was as if the pathetic self-delusions of the ego, those failings I had attempted to portray in the film, were being exhibited in real life. People do indeed have immense difficulty talking about themselves as they really are. I was reminded once again that the human animal suffers from the trait of instinctive self-aggrandizement."

Some modern sources have erroneously credited Nagata as the film's producer.

=== Accolades ===
Award	Date of ceremony	Category	Recipient(s)	Result	Ref.
Academy Awards	March 20, 1952	Honorary Foreign Language Film Award	Rashomon (Japan)	Won	
Academy Awards	March 19, 1953	Best Art Direction, Black-and-White	Takashi Matsuyama (art direction); H. Matsumoto (set decoration) (Note: The Academy merely referred to Matsuyama by his family name, and erroneously spelled Matsumoto's family name as "Motsumoto".)	Nominated	
Blue Ribbon Awards	March 22, 1951	Best Film	Rashomon	4th Place	
Blue Ribbon Awards	March 22, 1951	Best Screenplay	Akira Kurosawa; Shinobu Hashimoto	Won	
British Academy Film Awards	March 5, 1953	Best Film	Rashomon	Nominated	
Directors Guild of America Awards	February 1, 1953	Outstanding Directing – Feature Film	Akira Kurosawa	Nominated	
Foreign Language Press Film Critics Circle (via WNYC)	c. April 1952	Best Foreign Film	Rashomon (Robert Mochrie) (Note: Mochrie was the vice president of the film's American distributor, RKO Pictures, at the time and accepted the award on behalf of the Japanese crew.)	Won	
Kinema Junpo	1950	Top 10 Japanese Movies	Rashomon	5th Place	
Mainichi Film Awards	1950	Best Actress	Machiko Kyō (Note: Also received the award for her performance in Clothes of Deception.)	Won	
National Board of Review Awards	December 17, 1951	Best Foreign Film	Rashomon	Won	
National Board of Review Awards	December 17, 1951	Best Director	Akira Kurosawa	Won	
New York Film Critics Circle	January 20, 1952	Best Foreign Language Film	Rashomon	Runner-up	
Venice International Film Festival	September 10, 1951	Golden Lion	Rashomon	Won	
Venice International Film Festival	September 10, 1951	Italian Critics’ Prize	Rashomon	Won	

== Legacy ==
=== Associated films ===
The international success of Rashomon led Daiei to produce several subsequent jidaigeki films featuring Kyō as the lead. Among these were Kōzaburō Yoshimura's The Tale of Genji (1951), Teinosuke Kinugasa's Dedication of the Great Buddha (1952) and Gate of Hell (1953), Kenji Mizoguchi's Ugetsu (1953), and Keigo Kimura's The Princess Sen (1954), all of which received screenings overseas. In 1952, Daiei produced a Western-targeted epic, titled Beauty and the Thief, with the intent of obtaining a second Golden Lion. (Note: Daiei referred to the Golden Lion as the "Grand Prix", which is what the award was known as in Japan at the time.) Based on another story by Akutagawa, composed by Hayasaka, and starring Kyō, Mori, Shimura, Katō, and Honma, the film has been described as an inferior imitator of Rashomon and has since faded into obscurity. Mifune was also initially going to appear in Beauty and the Thief as suggested by a photograph of him taken by Werner Bischof during production in 1951 when the film was allegedly titled "Hokkaido".

=== Cultural impact ===
Rashomon has been cited as "one of the most influential films of the 20th century". In the early 1960s, film historians credited Rashomon as the start of the international New Wave cinema movement, which gained popularity during the late 1950s to early 1960s. It has since been cited as an inspiration for numerous films from around the world, including Andha Naal (1954), Valerie (1957), Last Year at Marienbad (1961), Yavanika (1982), Quentin Tarantino's Reservoir Dogs (1992) and Pulp Fiction (1994), The Usual Suspects (1995), Courage Under Fire (1996), Tape (2001), Hero (2002), and Fast X (2023).

Various television shows, including All in the Family (1971–1979), Frasier (1993–2004), and The Acolyte (2024) have made episodes inspired by the film. Some have compared Monster (2023) to the film; however, director Hirokazu Kore-eda claimed its similarities are merely coincidental. Ryan Reynolds' initial proposal for Deadpool & Wolverine (2024) was for it to have a plot similar to Rashomon.

In a 1998 issue of Time Out New York, Andrew Johnston wrote:

Rashomon is probably familiar even to those who haven't seen it, since in movie jargon, the film's title has become synonymous with its chief narrative conceit: a story told multiple times from various points of view. There's much more than that to the film, of course. For example, the way Kurosawa uses his camera...takes this fascinating meditation on human nature closer to the style of silent film than almost anything made after the introduction of sound.

==== Remakes and adaptations ====
It spawned numerous remakes and adaptations across film, television and theatre. Examples include:

- Rashomon as a play, various versions of which have been performed since the 1950s, including on Broadway in 1959 as written by Michael and Fay Kanin.
- The Outrage, a 1964 American western directed by Martin Ritt. Screenplay adapted by Michael Kanin from the 1959 Broadway version he co-wrote with his wife, Fay Kanin (above).
- Star Trek: The Next Generation, in 1990, (Season 3, Episode 14; "A Matter of Perspective") was produced and aired with a similar plot line to Rashomon, told from the viewpoints of Commander Riker, the assistant of a murdered scientist, and the scientist's widow.
- Courage Under Fire, a 1996 war film, in which events surrounding the rescue of a downed Bell UH-1 Iroquois helicopter in the First Gulf War are recounted in flashbacks by three different crew members.
- Frasier, in 1997 (Season 5, Episode 9; "Perspectives on Christmas"). The family each recall their day from different perspectives.
- The X-Files, in 1998, (Season 5, Episode 12; "Bad Blood") features differing accounts from Mulder and Scully regarding a vampire encounter.
- King of the Hill (Season 3, Episode 10; "A Fire Fighting We Will Go"). The gang each recalls the burning down of a firehouse from their perspective, each portraying themselves as the hero.
- Farscape, in 2000 (Season 2, Episode 17; "The Ugly Truth"), The crew of Moya are accused of being liars; the interrogators are from a species possessing eidetic memory, and therefore, they cannot comprehend subjective viewpoints.
- Smallville, in 2003 (Season 2, Episode 13; "Suspect"), depicts the mystery of who attempted the murder of Lionel Luthor with contradictory flashbacks from multiple perspectives.
- CSI: Crime Scene Investigation, in 2006, (Season 6, Episode 21; "Rashomama"). Nick's car containing all the evidence for a murder is stolen and the team attempts to continue the investigation based on their conflicting memories of the crime scene.
- It's Always Sunny in Philadelphia, in 2010, (Season 6, Episode 7; "Who Got Dee Pregnant?"). The gang have multiple versions of who impregnated Dee at a drunken Halloween party at Paddy's Pub.
- At the Gate of the Ghost, a 2011 Thai film by M.L. Pundhevanop Devakula, adapting Kurosawa's screenplay to ancient Ayutthaya.
- The Last Duel, Ridley Scott's 2021 historical drama of a rape and duel told through multiple points of view.

=== Retrospective reassessment ===
In the years following its release, several publications have named Rashomon one of the greatest films of all time, and it is also cited in the book 1001 Movies You Must See Before You Die. On the review aggregator website Rotten Tomatoes, 98% of 63 critics' reviews are positive, with an average rating of 9.2/10. The website's consensus reads: "One of legendary director Akira Kurosawa's most acclaimed films, Rashomon features an innovative narrative structure, brilliant acting, and a thoughtful exploration of reality versus perception." Metacritic, which uses a weighted average, assigned the film a score of 98 out of 100, based on 18 critics, indicating "universal acclaim".

Film critic Roger Ebert gave the film four stars out of four and included it in his Great Movies list.

==== Top lists ====
The film appeared on many critics' top lists of the best films.

- 10th – Directors' Top Ten Poll in 1992, Sight & Sound
- 10th – 100 Greatest Films list in 2000 The Village Voice
- "Top 100 Essential Films of All Time" by the National Society of Film Critics in 2002.
- 9th – Directors' Top Ten Poll in 2002, Sight & Sound
- 13th – Critics' poll in 2002, Sight & Sound
- 290th – The 500 Greatest Movies of All Time in 2008, Empire
- 50 Klassiker, Film by Nicolaus Schröder in 2002
- 1001 Movies You Must See Before You Die by Steven Jay Schneider in 2003
- 7th – Kinema Junpo's The Greatest Japanese Films of All Time in 2009.
- 22nd – Empire's "The 100 Best Films Of World Cinema" in 2010.
- 26th – Critics poll, 100 Greatest Films of All Time, Sight & Sound (2012)
- 18th – Director's poll, 100 Greatest Films of All Time, Sight & Sound (2012)
- Woody Allen included it among his top ten films.
- 79th – The 80 Best-Directed Films by the Directors Guild of America since its founding in 1936 (2016)
- 4th – BBC's list of "100 greatest foreign language films" in 2018.
- 41st – critic's poll, 100 Greatest Films of All Time, Sight & Sound (2022)
- 20th – director's poll, 100 Greatest Films of All Time, Sight & Sound (2022)

=== Preservation ===
In 2008, the film was restored by the Academy Film Archive, the National Film Center of the National Museum of Modern Art, Tokyo, and Kadokawa Pictures, Inc., with funding provided by the Kadokawa Culture Promotion Foundation and The Film Foundation.

== See also ==
- Kishōtenketsu
- List of films considered the best
- Nonlinear narrative
- Unreliable narrator
