= So Matsuyama =

Japanese production designer and art director (1908–1977)

Takashi Matsuyama (松山 崇, Matsuyama Takashi (Sō), September 22, 1908 - July 14, 1977), a.k.a. Sō Matsuda and Sō Matsuyama, was a Japanese production designer and art director. He was nominated twice for the Academy Award for Best Art Direction: the first time for his work in Rashomon (1950), and the second time for his work in Seven Samurai (1954). In 1950 he won the award for Best Art Direction at the Mainichi Film Concours for Stray Dog, directed by Akira Kurosawa.
