= In a Grove =

1922 short story by Ryūnosuke Akutagawa

- Author: Ryūnosuke Akutagawa
- Original title: 藪の中 (Yabu no naka)
- Translator: Takashi Kojima; Jay Rubin; James O'Brien
- Language: Japanese
- Genre: Short story
- Publisher: Shinchō
- Publication date: 1922
- Publication place: Japan
- English publication date: 1952, 1988, 2007
- Media type: Print

In a Grove (藪の中, Yabu no naka), also translated as In a Bamboo Grove, is a Japanese short story by Ryūnosuke Akutagawa first published in 1922. It was ranked as one of the "10 best Asian novels of all time" by The Telegraph in 2014. In a Grove has been adapted several times, most notably by Akira Kurosawa for his award-winning 1950 film Rashōmon.

The story centers on the violent death of young samurai Kanazawa no Takehiro, whose body has been found in a bamboo forest near Kyoto. The preceding events unfurl in a series of testimonies, first by passers-by, an auxiliary policeman and a relative, then by the three main protagonists – the samurai, his wife Masago, and bandit Tajōmaru – but the truth remains hidden due to the contradictory recounts given.

== Plot ==
The story opens with testimonies given to a police commissioner. The first account is by a woodcutter who has found a man's body in the bamboo groves near the road to Yamashina. The man's chest had been pierced by a sword, and the blood from the wound and on the ground had already dried up. Asked by the commissioner, the woodcutter denies having seen any weapons or a horse. The only objects which caught his attention were a comb and a piece of rope near the body. He also comments on the trampled leaves at the site, indicating to him that there had been a violent struggle.

The second testimony is given by a traveling Buddhist priest. He says that he saw the man, who was accompanied by a woman on horseback with a veiled face, on the road from Sekiyama to Yamashina around noon the previous day. The man was carrying a sword, a bow and a black quiver with arrows. Upon request, he describes the horse as a tall, short-maned sorrel.

The next person to testify is a "hōmen", an acquitted prisoner working under contract for the police. He has captured an infamous criminal named Tajōmaru. Tajōmaru had been thrown from a horse, a short-maned sorrel, which was grazing near-by. He still carried the bow and the black quiver with arrows belonging to the deceased. The hōmen reminds the commissioner of last year's murder of two women which is attributed to Tajōmaru, and speculates what he might have done to the dead man's wife.

The fourth testimony given to the police commissioner is from an old woman. She is the mother of the missing veiled woman, who is named Masago. She identifies the dead man as her daughter's husband, samurai Kanazawa no Takehiro, who was on his way to Wakasa, describing him as a benign person who couldn't have been hated by anyone. She is convinced that her daughter didn't know any other man than Takehiro, and describes her character as strong-willed. Desperate about her daughter's unknown fate, she begs the police to find her.

Next, the caught Tajōmaru confesses. He states that he killed the man, but not the still missing woman, not knowing of her whereabouts. Upon first seeing Masago with her husband on the road, her veiled face revealed by a gust, he decided that he was going to rape her. He awakened the man's interest by pretending to have found a deserted grave filled with swords and mirrors, which he was willing to sell for a modest price. He first lured the man away, subdued him and tied him to a tree, stuffing his mouth with leaves. He then went back to the woman, making up a story that her husband had fallen ill. When Masago saw her tied-up husband, she pulled a dagger from her bosom and tried to stab Tajōmaru, but he managed to disarm and then violate her. Claiming that he initially had no intention of killing the man, Tajōmaru reports that after the rape, the woman clung to him, insisting that one of the two men who knew of her shame had to die, and that she would leave with the survivor. Suddenly determining that he wanted her for himself, Tajōmaru untied Takehiro and killed him in the subsequent duel. When he turned to Masago, he found that she had fled in the meantime. Tajōmaru took the man's weapons as well as the horse, later getting rid of the sword. He closes his recount with the statement that he is accepting the most severe punishment.

The second-to-last account is by a woman at Kiyomizu-dera temple who turns out to be Masago. According to her, Tajōmaru fled after the rape, and her husband, still tied to the tree, looked at her with hate and contempt. Ashamed that she had been raped, she no longer wished to live, but wanted him to die with her. Believing that he agreed on her plan, she plunged her dagger into his chest. She then cut the rope that bound Takehiro and fled from the site. Despite repeated attempts, she found herself lacking the strength to commit suicide as planned. At the end of her confession, she cries.

The final account comes from Takehiro's ghost, as delivered through a medium. The ghost says that after the rape, Tajōmaru persuaded Masago to leave her husband and become his own wife, declaring that everything he did was out of love for her. To Takehiro's disdain, she not only agreed to follow him, but also ordered him to kill Takehiro. Tajōmaru, repelled by the suggestion, kicked her to the ground and asked Takehiro if he should kill her. While Takehiro still hesitated, Masago fled into the forest. Tajōmaru then freed him and ran away. Takehiro grabbed Masago's fallen dagger and plunged it into his chest. Shortly before he died, he sensed someone creep up to him and pull the dagger from his chest.

== Style ==
The story is divided into seven sections, one for each testimony, which are all given in direct speech. The first four are explicitly addressing a "police commissioner" or "magistrate" (orig. "kebiishi"), as written in the sections' titles. The functions of the persons addressed in the last three sections are not mentioned.

== Publication history ==
In a Grove first appeared in the January 1922 edition of the monthly Japanese literature magazine Shinchō.

== Translations ==
Yabu no naka was translated by Takashi Kojima as In a Grove for the 1952 English language edition published by C.E. Tuttle Company. In 1988, a translation by James O'Brien, titled Within a Grove, was released as part a collection of translated works by Akutagawa and Dazai Osamu, published by Arizona State University's Center for Asian Studies. For the 2007 Penguin Books edition, Jay Rubin translated the story as In a Bamboo Grove.

== Influences ==
Akutagawa's influences for this story may have come from several different sources:

- A story from the classic Japanese collection "Konjaku Monogatarishū": In the 23rd story of the 29th volume—"The Tale of The Bound Man Who Was Accompanying His Wife to Tanba"—a man is tied to a tree in a bamboo grove and forced to watch helplessly as his wife gets raped by a young thief, who has stolen all of their belongings.
- "The Moonlit Road" by Ambrose Bierce: a short story about the murder of a woman, as told by her husband and herself (through a medium), and introduced by their son.
- "The Ring and the Book" by Robert Browning: a narrative poem based on the true story about a murder told 12 different ways.

== Adaptations ==
In a Grove has been repeatedly adapted into films, including:

- Rashomon - Japan 1950, directed by Akira Kurosawa
- The Outrage - US 1964, directed by Martin Ritt
- Iron Maze - US 1987, directed by Hiroaki Yoshida
- In a Grove - Japan 1996, directed by Hisayasu Satō
- Misty - Japan 1997, directed by Kenki Saegusa
- The Outrage - Thailand 2011, directed by M.L. Pundhevanop Dhewakul
- The Bottomless Bag - Russia 2017, directed by Rustam Khamdamov

The story was adapted into an opera titled Rashomon: The Opera (1995–99) by Alejandro Viñao. It also served, together with two other stories by Akutagawa, as the basis for Michael John LaChiusa's musical See What I Wanna See.

In 2012, Spanish author and illustrator Víctor Santos combined In a Grove, Rashomon (the other Ryūnosuke Akutagawa short story which the 1950 film was named after), and the legend of the forty-seven rōnin into one graphic novel adaptation titled Rashomon: A Commissioner Heigo Kobayashi Case. The first part of the graphic novel, Rashomon, faithfully retells In a Grove, with protagonist Commissioner Heigo Kobayashi investigating the death of the samurai Takejiro Kanazawa by interrogating the witnesses (including the victim's mother-in-law who had been adapted out of the film version), the prime suspect Tajōmaru, the victim's widow, and Kanazawa through the medium. The section ends with Kobayashi unable to determine who and what had killed the samurai, whose widow remarries by becoming Kira Kozukenosuke's second wife, and Tajōmaru being executed soon after the investigation. The second part of the graphic novel, Seppuku, takes place three years later with Kobayashi now investigating the aftermath of Kozukenosuke's death at the hands of Asano Naganomi's forty-seven loyal rōnin. Rashomon: A Commissioner Heigo Kobayashi Case was first published in Spanish in 2012, with the English version published by Dark Horse Comics in 2017.

== In popular culture ==
The story's title has become an idiom in Japan, used to signify a situation where due to different views or statements of people involved, the truth remains hidden.

In a Grove is the favorite story of the titular character from the movie Ghost Dog: The Way of the Samurai.

The seventh episode of R.O.D the TV, titled In a Grove, deals with a similarly confusing mix of truth and lies, reality and pretense.

== See also ==
- Unreliable narrator
- Rashomon effect
