= Rashōmon (Noh play) =

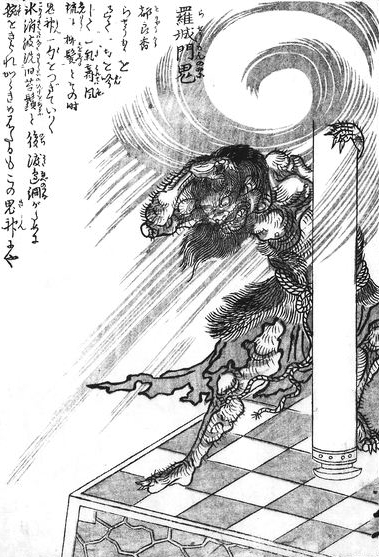
Toriyama Sekien drawing of the demon on the Rajōmon gate

Rashōmon (羅生門) is a Noh play by Kanze Nobumitsu (c. 1420). Like other celebrated dramas such as the Maodori-hasi and Ibaraki, it is based on the legend of Watanabe no Tsuna and the demon of Rashōmon.

== Historical setting ==
The play is set in the context of the final phase of the Heian period, leading up to the rise of rule by the military (by samurai warriors like Tsuna).

== Title, characters, and settings ==
The title is a pun, which involves the Rajōmon (羅城門) outer castle gate but Kanze changed it by using the kanji shō for "life" rather than the original jō for "castle" (note that 羅城門 was originally read raseimon and 生 can also be read as sei). It is one of the few Noh plays where the supporting waki (脇) rather than the normally leading shite (仕手) dominates the action. It is suggested that this can be attributed to the fact that Nobumitsu used to play waki roles when he was an actor. The shite character in this play only makes an appearance at the end and has no dialogue.

Rashōmon is also a play which follows characters from one venue to another. Act 1 takes place in the dining hall of a general, but in Act 2 the waki character, Tsuna, climbs the Rasho Gate to determine the truth of a story that a demon resides on the gate top.

== Later allusions ==
Kikaku wrote a haiku based on the play: “Tsuna now is leaving/ Tsuna is on every tongue - / On a rainy night.

This, with the play itself, was used as the basis for a painting by Gekkei (Matsumura Goshun).

== See also ==
- Benkei on the Bridge
- Hogen disturbance
