= Library of World Literature =

Soviet book series

The Library of World Literature (Russian: Библиотека всемирной литературы; transliteration: Biblioteka vsemirnoi literaturi; abbreviation: БВЛ / BVL; English translation: Library of World Literature) is a 200-volume Soviet book series dedicated to world literature, published in the years 1967 to 1977 by the publishing house Khudozhestvennaya literatura in the USSR.

It was the most ambitious, centralised, and best-funded effort to date to transform the workings of literary production, and consumption both in the Soviet Union and worldwide.

Numerous scholars and translators have contributed to the series. The volumes are provided with detailed thematic introductions, commentaries and illustrations.

The series ranges over the literary works of various epochs and civilisations, including the literature of the ancient East, ancient Greece and Rome, the Middle Ages, the Renaissance, the 17th and 18th centuries (Series One), the 19th century (Series Two), and the 20th century (Series Three). Several volumes are devoted to British, Australian and American writers. For example, Volume 192, published in 1975 in 303,000 copies, includes William Faulkner's Light in August (1932) and The Mansion (1960). The illustrations were done by Vitali Goryayev.

A catalogue of the Library of World Literature was published in 1979.

== Illustrations ==
More than 100 Soviet artists participated in the illustrating of The Library of World Literature, including Olgert Abelite, Savva Brodsky, Orest Vereisky, Boris Dekhterev, Leonid Zusman, Yevgeny Kibrick, Mikhail Mayofis, Boris Noskov, Anna Ostroumova-Lebedeva, Kuzma Petrov-Vodkin, Irakli Toidze, Aleksandr Deyneka, Vladimir Favorsky, Kukryniksy, Aleksandr Gerasimov, Georgiy Traugot and his sons Aleksandr and Valeriy, Dementiy Shmarinov, Dmitry Bisti.

== Awards ==
The Library of World Literature was awarded a gold medal in Leipzig Book Fair in 1971.

== Catalogue ==
=== Series One. Literature of the ancient East, ancient Greece and Rome, the Middle Ages, the Renaissance, the 17th and 18th centuries ===
==== Ancient East ====
- No. 1. Poetry and Prose of Ancient East: Tale of the Shipwrecked Sailor, Story of Sinuhe, The Blinding of Truth by Falsehood, Tale of Two Brothers, Tale of the Doomed Prince, The Taking of Joppa, Great Hymn to the Aten, Spell 125 the Weighing of the Heart from Book of the Dead / Epic of Gilgamesh / Book of Jonah, Book of Ruth, Song of Songs, Book of Job, Ecclesiastes (1973)
- No. 2. Mahabharata. Ramayana (1974)

==== Ancient Greece and Rome ====
- No. 3. Homer: Iliad, Odyssey (1967)
- No. 4. Poetry of Ancient Greece and Rome (Homer, Terpander, Alсaeus of Mytilene, Sappho, Anacreon, Alcman, Stesichorus, Ibycus, Corinna, Pindar, Bacchylides, Praxilla, Archilochus, Semonides of Amorgos, Hipponax, Callinus, Tyrtaeus, Solon, Mimnermus, Theognis of Megara, Simonides of Ceos, Xenophanes, Parrhasius, Choerilus of Samos, Euenus, Antimachus, Ion of Chios, Ion of Ephesus, Plato, Hegesippus, Euenus of Ascolon, Demodocus of Leros, Crates of Thebes, Menander, Erinna, Adaios, Phalaecos, Philitas of Cos, Posidippus, Theocritus, Callimachus, Hedylus, Asclepiades of Samos, Alexander Aetolus, Leonidas of Tarentum, Simmias of Rhodes, Dioscorides, Anyte of Tegea, Alcaeus of Messene, Simonides of Magnesia, Bion of Smyrna, Moschus, Antipater of Sidon, Philodemus, Meleager of Gadara, Catullus, Tibullus, Propertius, Ovid, Horace, Seneca, Martial, Ausonius) (1968)
- No. 5. Drama of Ancient Greece and Rome. Aeschylus: The Persians, Prometheus Bound / Sophocles: Oedipus Rex, Antigone / Euripides: Medea, Hippolytus / Aristophanes: The Clouds, Peace / Menander: Dyskolos / Plautus: Menaechmi / Terence: Andria / Seneca: Octavia (1970)
- No. 6. Virgil: Bucolics. Georgics. Aeneid (1971)
- No. 7. Achilles Tatius Leucippe and Clitophon / Longus Daphnis and Chloe / Petronius Satyricon / Apuleius Metamorphoses, or the Golden Ass (1969)

==== The Middle Ages, the Renaissance, the 17th century ====
- No. 8. Icelandic sagas: Gísla saga / Njáls saga. Irish sagas. (1973)
- No. 9. Beowulf / Poetic Edda / Nibelungenlied (1975)
- No. 10. Song of Roland / Li coronemenz Loois / Charroi de Nimes / The Song of my Cid / Romancero (1976)
- No. 11. The songs of Southern Slavs (1976)
- No. 12. Kalevala (1977)
- No. 13. Oral epic poems of people of the USSR. Vol.1 (1975)
- No. 14. Oral epic poems of people of the USSR. Vol.2 (1975)
- No. 15. Miscellany, the medieval literature of Russia. (1969)
- No. 16. The classical poetry of India, China, Korea, Vietnam, Japan: Kalidasa, Amaru, Bhartrhari, Van Hanh, Nguyen Binh Khiem, Ho Xuan Huong, Ly Thong Kiet, Otomo no Yakamochi, Princess Nukata, Ōtomo no Sakanoue, Ono no Takamura, Ariwara no Narihira, Ono no Komachi, Fun'ya no Yasuhid (1977)
- No. 17. Classical drama of East. Bhāsa: The dream of Vasavadatta / Shudraka: The Little Clay Cart / Kalidasa: Shakuntala / Ma Zhiyuan: Autumn in Han Palace / Tang Xianzu: The Peony Pavilion / Kanze Kojiro Nobumitsu: Funa Benkei / Chikamatsu Monzaemon: The Night Song of Yosaku from Tamba, The Woman-Killer and the Hell of Oil (1976)
- No. 18. Classical prose of Far East. Chinese Prose of IV-XVIII centuries. Gan Bao: In Search of the Supernatural; Tao Yuanming, Guo Xiang, Yiqing Liu, Shen Jiji, Bai Xingjian: The Tale of Li Wa / Yuan Zhen: Yingying's Biography (1975)
- No. 19. One Thousand and One Nights (1975)
- No. 20. Arabian poetry of Middle Ages (1975)
- No. 21. Persian and Tajik poetry (Rudaki, Nasir Khusraw, Omar Khayyam, Rumi, Saadi Shirazi, Hafez, Jami) (1974)
- No. 22. Medieval chivalric romances and novels: Chrétien de Troyes Yvain, the Knight of the Lion / Tristan and Iseult / Aucassin and Nicolette / Wolfram von Eschenbach Parzival / Hartmann von Aue Der arme Heinrich (1974)
- No. 23. The Troubadour Poetry. The Minnesänger Poetry. Carmina Burana (1974)
- No. 24. Ferdowsi: Shahnameh (1972)
- No. 25. Nizami Ganjavi: The Treasury or Storehouse of Mysteries, Khosrow and Shirin, Layla and Majnun, The Seven Beauties, Iskandarnameh (Book of Alexander) (1968)
- No. 26. Ali-Shir Nava'i: Wonders of Good People, Farhad and Shirin, Layli and Majnun, Seven Travelers, "Alexander's Wall" (1972)
- No. 27. Shota Rustaveli: The Knight in the Panther's Skin (1969)
- No. 28. Dante Alighieri: La Vita Nuova. Divine Comedy (1967)
- No. 29. Giovanni Boccaccio: The Decameron (1970)
- No. 30. Geoffrey Chaucer: The Canterbury Tales (1973)
- No. 31. European novels of the Renaissance: Franco Sacchetti, Giovanni Fiorentino, Masuccio Salernitano, Luigi Pulci, Lorenzo de' Medici, Niccolò Machiavelli, Francesco Maria Molza, Luigi Alamanni, Luigi Da Porto, Antonio Francesco Grazzini, Matteo Bandello, Pietro Fortini, Giovanni Battista Giraldi, Giovanni Francesco Straparola, Girolamo Parabosco, Scipione Bargagli, Nicolas de Troyes, Bonaventure des Périers, Noël du Fail, Marguerite de Navarre, François de Belleforest, Jean de Cholières, Francisco López de Villalobos, Antonio de Villegas, Juan de Timoneda, Miguel de Cervantes, Tirso de Molina, Gaspar Lucas Hidalgo, Agustín de Rojas Villandrando, Antonio de Eslava (1974)
- No. 32. European poetry of the Renaissance: Dante Alighieri, Petrarch, Giovanni Boccaccio, Leonardo Giustiniani, Burchiello, Giovanni Pontano, Luigi Pulci, Cino da Pistoia, Matteo Maria Boiardo, Lorenzo de' Medici, Michael Tarchaniota Marullus, Poliziano, Jacopo Sannazaro, Niccolò Machiavelli, Pietro Bembo, Ludovico Ariosto, Michelangelo, Teofilo Folengo, Francesco Berni, Giovanni della Casa, Gaspara Stampa, Giovan Battista Strozzi, Luigi Tansillo, Galeazzo di Tarsia, Torquato Tasso, Marko Marulić, Ilija Crijević, Šiško Menčetić, Džore Držić, Marin Krstičević, Antun Vrančić, Mavro Vetranović, Hanibal Lucić, Petar Hektorović, Marin Kaboga, Marin Držić (1974)
- No. 33. Sebastian Brant: Ship of Fools / Erasmus of Rotterdam: In Praise of Folly, Scarabaeus aquilam quaerit (A Dung Beetle Hunting an Eagle), Colloquies / Epistolæ Obscurorum Virorum (Letters of Obscure Men) / Ulrich von Hutten: Dialogues (1971)
- No. 34. Utopian novels of the 16th-17th centuries. Thomas More: Utopia / Tommaso Campanella: The City of the Sun / Francis Bacon: New Atlantis / Cyrano de Bergerac: Comical History of the States and Empires of the Moon / Denis Vairasse: History of the Sevarambians (1971)
- No. 35. François Rabelais: Gargantua and Pantagruel (1973)
- No. 36. William Shakespeare: Romeo and Juliet, Hamlet, Othello, King Lear, Macbeth, Anthony and Cleopatra, Sonnets (1968)
- No. 37. Miguel de Cervantes: Don Quixote, Part 1 (1970)
- No. 38. Miguel de Cervantes: Don Quixote, Part 2 (1970)
- No. 39. Theatre of the Spanish Golden Age. Lope de Vega: Fuenteovejuna, The Dog in the Manger / Tirso de Molina: The Trickster of Seville and the Stone Guest / Juan Ruiz de Alarcón: Suspect Truth / Pedro Calderón de la Barca: The Constant Prince, The Phantom Lady / Agustín Moreto y Cavana: El parecido en la corte (1969)
- No. 40. Picaresque novels. Lazarillo de Tormes / Francisco de Quevedo: El Buscón (The Swindler) / Luis Vélez de Guevara: The Limping Devil/ Alonso de Castillo Solórzano: La Garduña de Sevilla y Anzuelo de las bolsas / Thomas Nashe: The Unfortunate Traveller (1975)
- No. 41. European poetry of XVII century (1977)
- No. 42. François de La Rochefoucauld: The Maxims / Blaise Pascal: Pensées (Thoughts) / Jean de La Bruyère: The Caractères (1974)
- No. 43. Theatre of French Classicism. Pierre Corneille, Jean Racine (1970)
- No. 44. Molière: Les Précieuses ridicules, The Forced Marriage, Tartuffe, or, the Impostor, Don Juan, or, The Stone Guest, The Misanthrope, The Doctor in Spite of Himself, The Miser, Monsieur de Pourceaugnac, The Bourgeois Gentleman, The Impostures of Scapin, The Imaginary Invalid (1972)
- No. 45. John Milton: Paradise Lost. Poems. Samson Agonistes (1976)
- No. 46. Hans Jakob Christoffel von Grimmelshausen: Simplicius Simplicissimus (1976)

==== Literature of the 18th century ====
- No. 47. Robert Burns: Poems / Scottish Ballads (1971)
- No. 48. Pierre Beaumarchais: The Barber of Seville, The Marriage of Figaro, The Guilty Mother (1971)
- No. 49. Voltaire: The Maid of Orleans, Mahomet, Zadig, Micromégas, Candide, L'Ingénu (The Sincere Huron), The Princess of Babylon (1971)
- No. 50. Johann Wolfgang von Goethe: Faust (1969)
- No. 51. Carlo Goldoni / Carlo Gozzi / Vittorio Alfieri (1971)
- No. 52. Daniel Defoe: Robinson Crusoe, Colonel Jack (1974)
- No. 53. Denis Diderot: La Religieuse, Rameau's Nephew, Jacques the Fatalist (1973)
- No. 54. Gotthold Ephraim Lessing: Plays, Fables (1972)
- No. 55. Poetry of the peoples of the USSR IV-XVIII centuries. (1972)
- No. 56. Abbé Prévost: Manon Lescaut / Pierre Choderlos de Laclos: Dangerous Liaisons (1967)
- No. 57. Russian poetry of XVIII century: Antiochus Kantemir, Vasily Trediakovsky, Mikhail Lomonosov, Alexander Sumarokov, Vasily Maykov, Mikhail Kheraskov, Ippolit Bogdanovich, Ivan Chemnitzer, Vasily Kapnist, Alexander Radishchev, Nikolay Lvov, Mikhail Muravyov, Yury Neledinsky-Meletsky, Ivan Krylov, Nikolay Karamzin, Ivan Dmitriev, Gavrila Derzhavin (1972)
- No. 59. Jonathan Swift: A Tale of a Tub, Gulliver's Travels (1976)
- No. 61. Laurence Sterne: The Life and Opinions of Tristram Shandy, Gentleman, A Sentimental Journey Through France and Italy (1968)
- No. 62. Henry Fielding: The History of Tom Jones, a Foundling (1973)
- No. 63. Russian prose of XVIII century: Mikhail Chulkov, Nikolay Novikov, Denis Fonvizin, Alexander Radishchev, Ivan Krylov, Nikolay Karamzin (1971)
- No. 64. Friedrich Schiller: The Robbers, Intrigue and Love, Wallenstein's Camp, Wallenstein's Death, Mary Stuart, William Tell, Poems (1975)

=== Series Two. Literature of XIX century ===
- No. 66. Hans Christian Andersen: Fairy Tales (1973)
- No. 67. George Gordon Byron: Childe Harold's Pilgrimage, Don Juan (1972)
- No. 68. Honoré de Balzac: Lost Illusions (1973)
- No. 69. Pierre-Jean de Béranger: The Songs / Auguste Barbier: Poems / Pierre Dupont: The Songs (1976)
- No. 70. Ivan Vazov: Under the Yoke (1970)
- No. 71. Thomas Hardy: Tess of the d'Urbervilles, Jude the Obscure (1970)
- No. 72. Heinrich Heine: Poems, Prose (1971)
- No. 73. Alexander Herzen: My Past and Thoughts Parts I-V (1969)
- No. 74. Alexander Herzen: My Past and Thoughts Parts VI-VIII (1969)
- No. 75. Nikolai Gogol: Dead Souls (1975)
- No. 76. Edmond und Jules de Goncourt: Germinie Lacerteux, Les Frères Zemganno, La Faustin (1972)
- No. 77. Ivan Goncharov: Oblomov (1973)
- No. 78. E. T. A. Hoffmann: The Life and Opinions of the Tomcat Murr, The Sandman, Little Zaches called Cinnabar, Mademoiselle de Scuderi, The Nutcracker and the Mouse King, and Other Novellas (1967)
- No. 79. Alexander Griboyedov: Woe from Wit / Aleksandr Sukhovo-Kobylin: Plays / Alexander Ostrovsky: Plays (1974)
- No. 80. Victor Hugo: Ninety-Three, Hernani, Poems (1973)
- No. 81. Alphonse Daudet: Tartarin of Tarascon, L'Immortel (One of the Forty) (1974)
- No. 82. Charles Dickens: Oliver Twist. Novellas and short stories (1969)
- No. 83. Fyodor Dostoevsky: Crime and Punishment (1970)
- No. 84. Fyodor Dostoevsky: The Brothers Karamazov (1973)
- No. 85. European Poetry of XIX century: Johann Mayrhofer, Joseph Christian Freiherr von Zedlitz, Franz Grillparzer, Nikolaus Lenau, Johann Nepomuk Vogl, Adalbert Stifter, Anastasius Grün, Moritz Hartmann (1977)
- No. 86. Émile Zola: Thérèse Raquin, Germinal (1975)
- No. 87. Henrik Ibsen: Peer Gynt, A Doll's House, Ghosts, An Enemy of the People, The Wild Duck, Hedda Gabler, The Master Builder, John Gabriel Borkman, Poetry (1972)
- No. 88. Gottfried Keller: Green Henry (1972)
- No. 89. Heinrich von Kleist: Plays, Short Stories (1969)
- No. 90. Charles De Coster: The Legend of Thyl Ulenspiegel and Lamme Goedzak (1967)
- No. 91. James Fenimore Cooper: The Spy, The Last of the Mohicans (1974)
- No. 92. Nikolai Leskov: Lady Macbeth of the Mtsensk District, The Amazon, The Sealed Angel, The Enchanted Wanderer, The Tale of Cross-eyed Lefty from Tula and the Steel Flea, and Other Stories and Novellas (1973)
- No. 93. Mikhail Lermontov: Poems, Masquerade, A Hero of Our Time (1972)
- No. 94. Herman Melville: Moby-Dick (1967)
- No. 95. Prosper Mérimée: La Chronique du Temps de Charles IX, Mateo Falcone, Carmen, and Other Novellas (1968)
- No. 96. Adam Mickiewicz: Poems (1968)
- No. 97. Guy de Maupassant: Une vie, Bel-Ami (Dear Friend), Short Stories (1970)
- No. 98. Nikolay Nekrasov: Poems (1971)
- No. 99. Jan Neruda: Poems, Short Stories, Tales of the Lesser Quarter (1975)
- No. 100. Sándor Petőfi: Poems (1971)
- No. 101. Edgar Allan Poe: Poetry. Tales (1976)
- No. 107. George Sand: Mauprat, Horace (1974)
- No. 110. Stendhal: The Red and the Black (1969)
- No. 111. Mark Twain: The Adventures of Tom Sawyer, Adventures of Huckleberry Finn, Stories (1971)
- No. 112. William Thackeray: Vanity Fair (1968)
- No. 113. Leo Tolstoy: War and Peace, Vol.1 and 2 (1968)
- No. 114. Leo Tolstoy: War and Peace, Vol.3 and 4 (1968)
- No. 115. Leo Tolstoy: Anna Karenina (1976)
- No. 116. Leo Tolstoy: Resurrection, The Death of Ivan Ilyich and Other Stories (1976)
- No. 117. Ivan Turgenev: A Sportsman's Sketches, On the Eve, Fathers and Sons (1971)
- No. 118. Oscar Wilde: Poetry, The Picture of Dorian Gray, De Profundis / Rudyard Kipling: Poetry, Short stories (1976)
- No. 119. Henry Wadsworth Longfellow: The Song of Hiawatha / Walt Whitman: Poetry / Emily Dickinson: Poetry (1976)
- No. 120. Gustave Flaubert: Madame Bovary, Sentimental Education (1971)
- No. 121. Ivan Franko: Poetry, Short Stories, Boryslav Laughs (1971)
- No. 122. Nikolay Chernyshevsky: What Is to Be Done? (1969)
- No. 123. Anton Chekhov: Short stories,The Seagull, Three Sisters, The Cherry Orchard (1974)
- No. 125. Poetry of English Romanticism. William Blake: The Book of Thel, The Marriage of Heaven and Hell, Visions of the Daughters of Albion, Songs of Innocence and of Experience, and Other Poems / Walter Scott / Samuel Taylor Coleridge: The Rime of the Ancient Mariner, and Other Poems / William Wordsworth / Robert Southey / Thomas Moore / Lord Byron: The Prisoner of Chillon, Beppo, and Other Poems / Percy Bysshe Shelley: Adonais, and Other Poems / John Keats: Isabella, or The Pot of Basil, The Eve of St. Agnes, and Other Poems (1975)
- No. 127. Eça de Queiroz: The Crime of Father Amaro, Correspondence of Fradique Mendes (1977)

=== Series Three. Literature of the 20th century ===
- No. 128. Sadriddin Ayni: Slaves (1975)
- No. 129. Ryūnosuke Akutagawa: Rashōmon, The Nose, The Spider's Thread, Hell Screen, In a Grove, Kappa, and Other Novellas (1974)
- No. 130. Ivo Andrić: Chronicles of Travnik, The Bridge on the Drina (1974)
- No. 131. Poetry of Africa: Assia Djebar, Mohammed Dib, Kateb Yacine, Henri Kréa, Malek Haddad, Boualem Khalfa, Bachir Hadj Ali, Agostinho Neto, Kofi Awoonor, Michael Dei-Anang, Efua Sutherland, Salah Jahin, Salah Abdel Sabour, Ahmed Shawqi, Patrice Lumumba (1973)
- No. 132. Louis Aragon: La Semaine Sainte (1976)
- No. 133. Mariano Azuela: The Underdogs / Rómulo Gallegos: Doña Bárbara / Miguel Ángel Asturias: El Señor Presidente (1970)
- No. 134. Mukhtar Auezov: The Path of Abai, Vol.1 (1971)
- No. 135. Mukhtar Auezov: The Path of Abai, Vol.2 (1971)
- No. 136. Henri Barbusse: Under Fire, Clarté (Light), Faits divers (1967)
- No. 137. Johannes R. Becher: Poems, Abschied, Dreimal bebende Erde (1970)
- No. 138. Alexander Blok: Poems, Plays (1968)
- No. 139. Bertolt Brecht: Poems, Short stories, Plays (1972)
- No. 140 Ivan Bunin: Poems, Short stories, Novellas (1973)
- No. 141. Miguel de Unamuno: Mist, Abel Sánchez (1973)
- No. 144. Jaroslav Hašek: The Good Soldier Švejk (1967)
- No. 145. John Galsworthy: The Forsyte Saga, Vol.1 (1973)
- No. 146. John Galsworthy: The Forsyte Saga, Vol.2 (1973)
- No. 150. Theodore Dreiser: An American Tragedy (1969)
- No. 152. Western European poetry of XX century: Hugo von Hofmannsthal, Rainer Maria Rilke, Karl Kraus, Stefan Zweig, Berthold Viertel, Albert Ehrenstein, Hermann Broch, Georg Trakl, Alma Johanna Koenig, Franz Werfel, Josef Weinheber
- No. 158. Halldór Laxness: Independent People, Iceland's Bell (1977)
- No. 160. Jack London: Martin Eden, Short stories (1972)
- No. 162. Lu Xun: Diary of a Madman and Other Stories (1971)
- No. 165. Thomas Mann: Buddenbrooks (1969)
- No. 166. Roger Martin du Gard: The Thibaults, Vol.1 (1972)
- No. 167. Roger Martin du Gard: The Thibaults, Vol.2 (1972)
- No. 170. Latin American Poetry. José Martí, Rubén Darío, Leopoldo Lugones, Alfonsina Storni, Ricardo Molinari, Jorge Luis Borges, Ricardo Jaimes Freyre, Manuel Bandeira, Oswald de Andrade, Raul Bopp, Mário de Andrade, Jorge de Lima, Fernando Paz Castillo, Amado Nervo, Enrique González Martínez, Ramón López Velarde, Alfonso Reyes, Octavio Paz, José Santos Chocano, José María Eguren, César Vallejo, Luis Palés Matos, Julio Herrera y Reissig, Delmira Agustini, Juana de Ibarbourou, Gabriela Mistral, Vicente Huidobro, Pablo Neruda, Jorge Carrera Andrade (1975)
- No. 173. Rainis: Poems (1976)
- No. 175. Romain Rolland: Jean-Christophe, Books 1-5 (1970)
- No. 176. Romain Rolland: Jean-Christophe, Books 6-10 (1970)
- No. 177. Silver Age of Russian Poetry. Maxim Gorky, Valery Bryusov, Konstantin Balmont, Fyodor Sologub, Vyacheslav Ivanov, Andrei Bely, Innokenty Annensky, Sasha Chorny, Anna Akhmatova, Mikhail Kuzmin, Osip Mandelstam, Maximilian Voloshin, Velimir Khlebnikov, Igor Severyanin, Boris Pasternak, Marina Tsvetaeva (1977)
- No. 184. Rabindranath Tagore: Poems, Short Stories, Gora (1973)
- No. 185. Aleksandr Tvardovsky: Poems (1971)
- No. 186. Aleksey Nikolayevich Tolstoy: The Road to Calvary (1972)
- No. 187. Andrejs Upīts: Novels (1970)
- No. 188. Herbert George Wells: The Time Machine, The Island of Doctor Moreau, The Invisible Man, The War of the Worlds (1972)
- No. 189. Alexander Fadeyev: The Rout, The Young Guard (1971)
- No. 190. Konstantin Fedin: Cities and Years, Brothers (1974)
- No. 191. Lion Feuchtwanger: Success (1973)
- No. 192. William Faulkner: Light in August, The Mansion (1975)
- No. 194. Dmitry Furmanov: Chapayev / Alexander Serafimovich: The Iron Flood / Nikolai Ostrovsky: How the Steel Was Tempered (1967)
- No. 195. Ernest Hemingway: A Farewell to Arms, The Fifth Column and the First Forty-Nine Stories, The Old Man and the Sea (1972)
- No. 200. Bernard Shaw: Mrs. Warren's Profession, Candida, The Devil's Disciple, Caesar and Cleopatra, Pygmalion, Saint Joan, The Apple Cart, Shakes versus Shav (1969)
