= Desbordes =

Desbordes is a surname. Notable people with the surname include:

- Drew Desbordes, better known as Druski (born 1994), American comedian
- Gustave Borgnis-Desbordes (1839–1900), French general
- Henri Desbordes (died c.1722), French printer in Amsterdam
- Marceline Desbordes-Valmore (1786–1859), French poet and novelist
- Mario Desbordes (born 1968), Chilean politician and police officer
- Michèle Desbordes (1940–2006), French writer
