= Jacques Bernard (theologian) =

French theologian (1658–1718)

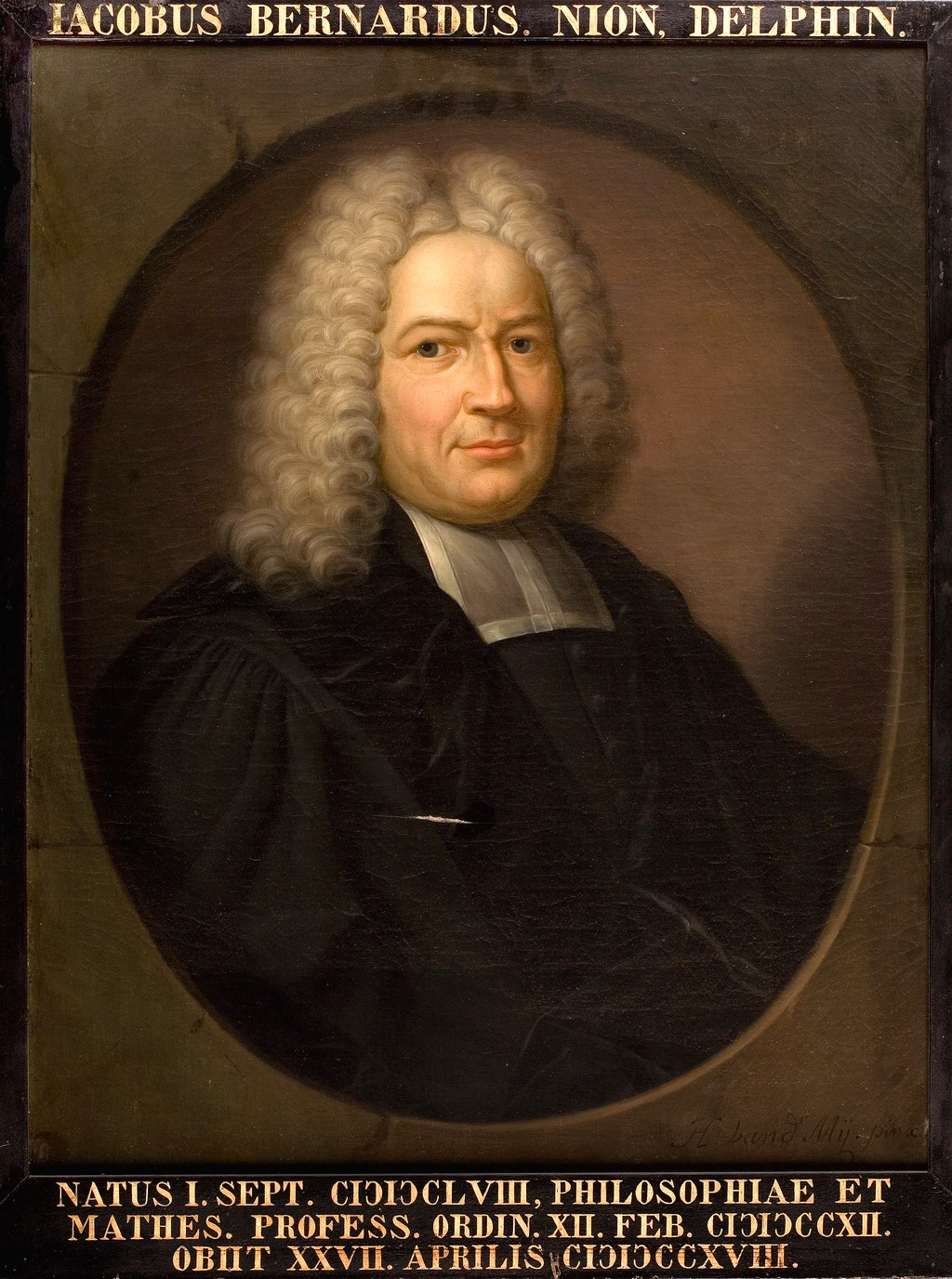
Jacques Bernard

Jacques Bernard (1 September 1658 – 27 April 1718), French theologian and publicist, who lived his entire academic career in the Dutch Republic.

== Life ==
He was born at Nyons in Dauphiné. Having studied at Geneva, he returned to France in 1679, and was chosen minister of Venterol in Dauphiné. He moved to the church of Vinsobres. As he continued to preach the reformed doctrines (in opposition to the royal ordinance) he was obliged to leave the country and retired to Holland, where he was appointed one of the pensionary ministers of Gouda. In July 1686 he began publishing the Histoire abregée de l'Europe which he continued, monthly, until December 1688.

In 1692 he began his Lettres historiques, containing an account of the most important events in Europe. He carried on this work until the end of 1688. When Le Clerc discontinued his Bibliothèque universelle in 1691, Bernard wrote the greater part of the twentieth volume and the five following volumes. In 1698 he collected and published Actes et mémoires des négociations de la paix Ryswick, in four volumes.

In 1699 he began a continuation of Bayle's Nouvelles de la republique des lettres, which continued until December 1710. In 1705 he was unanimously elected one of the ministers of the Walloon church at Leiden; and about the same time he succeeded de Volder in the chair of philosophy and mathematics at Leiden. From 1712 until 1718 he was a full professor at the University of Leiden.

In 1716 he published a supplement to Moréri's dictionary, in two volumes folio. The same year he resumed his Nouvelles de la république des lettres, and continued it until his death. Besides the works above mentioned, he was the author of two practical treatises, one on late repentance (1712), the other on the excellence of religion (1714).

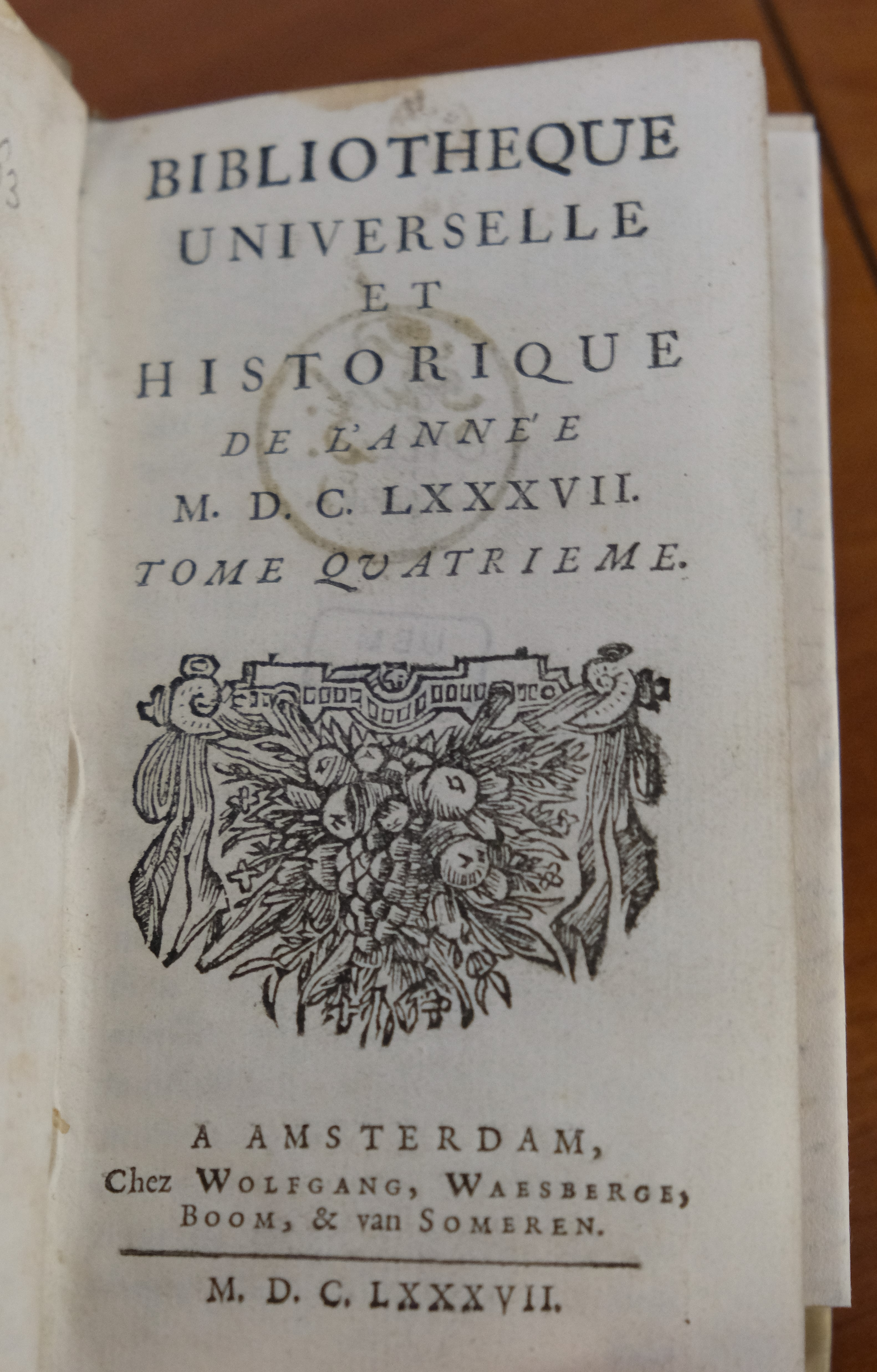
Front page of a 1687 copy of Bibliotheque universelle et historique de l'année MDCLXXXVI
