= Republic of Letters =

16th–19th-century long-distance intellectual community in Europe and the Americas

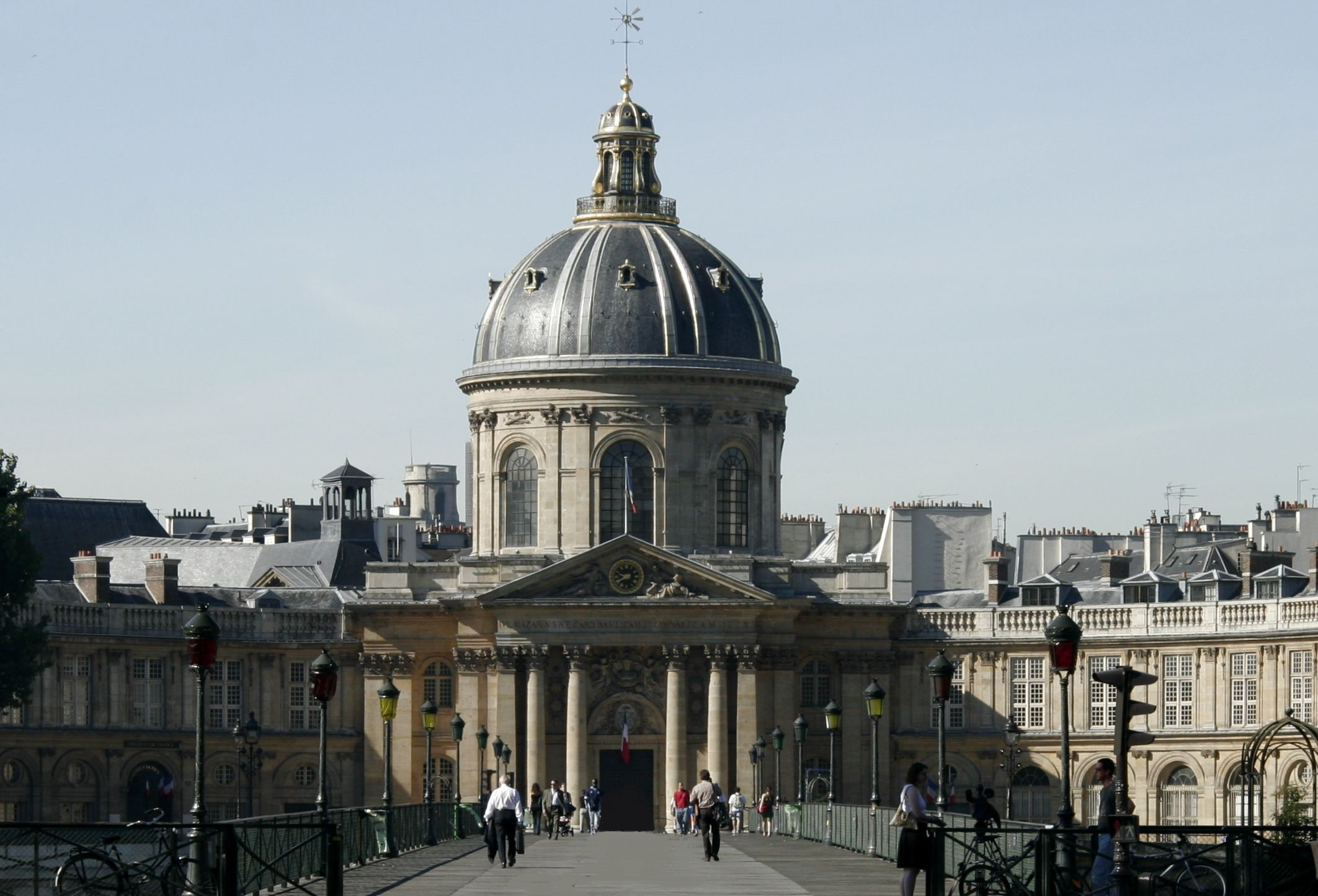
The Institut de France was a learned society which played a key role in the Republic of Letters and Age of Enlightenment

The Republic of Letters (Res Publica Litterarum or Respublica litteraria) refers to the collective intellectual sphere of literature and scholarly discourse in Europe and the Americas, dating from the early 16th century and persisting through the 19th century. It is regarded as an ideal network of intellectual communication and discussion that emerged as a means of overcoming distance between scientific communities, as well as the growing polarization and political tension between nations. The term entered into broader circulation and a more concrete association following French philosopher Pierre Bayle's 1684 publications of the Nouvelles de la République des Lettres in Amsterdam.

The corporeality of the Republic of Letters as a recognized community has been subject to increasing debate in scholarly circles. The common consensus is that the Republic existed as an intricate academic network which fostered communication among the intellectuals of the Age of Enlightenment––or 'philosophes', as they were called in France––and served partially as a combative method to growing censorship from the Catholic Church during the Protestant Reformation. These communities that transcended national boundaries formed the basis of a metaphysical republic. Due to societal constraints and gendered norms of the era, the Republic of Letters consisted primarily of men. However, there were several significant female figures, such as Anna Maria van Schurman and Maria de Gourney, who made major contributions towards the Republic of Letters and used combinations of social reform and intellectual contributions to ensure that their voices were heard.

== History and etymology ==
The first known early-modern occurrence of the term as it is now understood in its Latin form (Respublica litteraria) is in a letter by Francesco Barbaro to Poggio Bracciolini dated July 6, 1417. Currently, the consensus is that Pierre Bayle first translated the term in his journal Nouvelles de la République des Lettres in 1684. Some historians point out, though, that the true origin of the term dates back as far as Plato's Republic.

The translation itself presents similar academic controversy, as "The Republic of Letters" implies modern associations that scholars argue aren't necessarily accurate. 'Republica' in this context would be more understandably translated as 'the commonwealth,' as the Republic of Letters was not a republic in the modern political understanding of the word, but rather a community built on the understanding and value of shared ideas. Similarly, 'literaria' is indicative of the broader term 'learning,' rather than referring specifically to letters or books. The likely reality of the function and framework of the Respublica literaria, then, can be better grasped using the translation 'the learned commonwealth.'

=== A real and imagined community ===
Modern scholars have formed varying opinions on the corporeality of the learned community insofar as its existence as an established system of scholarly exchange through letter-writing. The Republic of Letters is not as concretely defined a society as others of the time, such as the Royal Society or the Accademia dei Lincei. Rather, it functions as more as a label which seeks to encompass the vast and intricate network of correspondence and public distribution of emerging scientific, mathematical, philosophical and naturalistic thought at the cusp of the Age of Enlightenment. This includes more formally institutionalized learned societies, which formed under the broader paradigm of the Respublica Litteraria.

The term 'letters,' refers not necessarily to traditional postal correspondence, but instead speaks to the literary currency of the public exchange of ideas. Networks of written exchange provided those wishing to engage in scholarly discourse and academic thought with a uniting global element that local in-person discussion lacked. Print publication and written works were more easily distributed across geographical distances, allowing intellectuals to engage with each other over larger distances.

=== Bodies within the Republic ===
Academies like the Royal Society encouraged discourse and debate that led to enlightenment. Their motto Nullius in verba (take nobody's word for it) embodied the spirit of inquiry and scientific investigation.

Though the Republic of Letters refers to an overarching abstract entity of scholarly communication, the network facilitated the foundation of more specialized brick and mortar academies, such as the Royal Society and the Institut de France. The term 'academia' experienced a revival in tandem with Respublica litteraria. It encapsulated the sentiment of bodies of social collaboration for the sake of further expanding knowledge and discussion of humanism, and came to be associated closely with these emerging "academies."

The Royal Society was founded in the 1660s promoted new scientific thought––particularly natural philosophy. It and similar institutions became centers of collections and cataloging within the larger Respublica litteraria, and came to function as legitimizing bodies which helped to institutionalize correspondence. Weekly meetings held by the society provided the opportunity to read and discuss scientific publications and recent letters in a formal setting. Preceded by the Invisible College, The Royal Society created its own distinct charters and established a system of governance. Its most renowned leader was Isaac Newton, president from 1703 until his death in 1727. Other notable members include diarist John Evelyn, writer Thomas Sprat, and scientist Robert Hooke, the Society's first curator of experiments. The Royal Society played an international role to adjudicate scientific findings, and published the journal Philosophical Transactions of the Royal Society, edited by Henry Oldenburg. Such publications contributed to the wider diffusion of thought and encouraged and enabled a wider participation in scientific exchange.

American author and historian Anne Goldgar argues that, in the transitional period between the 17th century and the Enlightenment, the most important common concern by self-identified members of the Republic of Letters and the bodies it was made up of, was their own conduct. In the conception of its own members, ideology, religion, political philosophy, scientific strategy, and other intellectual or philosophical frameworks were not as important as their own self-identity as a community of scholars dedicated to the pursuit of knowledge.

A radical critique of worldliness, inspired by Rousseau, emerged in salons after 1770. These radicals denounced the mechanisms of polite sociability and called for a new model of the independent writer who would address the public and the nation.

All the property of friends is held in common.

— Erasmus

== Methods of communication ==
Correspondence within the Republic of Letters was heavily contingent upon the exchange of letters, intellectual papers, manuals of study and erudite journals among scholars and learned elites of the time. In addition to written correspondence, further communication was facilitated through travel and diplomatic exchange. In particular, learned Englishmen living aboard such as Thomas Dereham and Thomas Woolhouse of the Royal Society facilitated further exchange of ideas and information during a time when transcontinental postal services were often slow and highly unreliable. The work of educational circuits and professional diplomatic secretaries helped expand the Republic of Letters to in-person exchanges, conversation, and lively debate, which laid the foundation for the formation of early learned societies, scientific academies, and salons.

As time progressed, handwritten letters and print culture became more prominent, and scholars often used students as a way to transmit information while simultaneously avoiding ever-increasing shipping costs. Periodicals and printed publications remained the most successful however, when the primary goal was to spread information and scientific discovery to the masses.

== Female involvement ==
Several female figures have contributed significant works to what is now considered the Republic of Letters. They often offered important contributions to the scientific world while simultaneously emphasizing the importance of education for women and the flaws of the system at the time, which enforced gender inequality.

=== Anna Maria van Schurman ===
Anna Maria van Schurman was known for her ability to foster a sense of community among the women involved in the Republic of Letters. She is considered to be the first female university student in Europe today, and had multiple works in the Republic about the rights of women to education. In addition to her work on social reformation, she was particularly known for her education and correspondence about theology and philosophy and the connections between natural observations and the work of God.

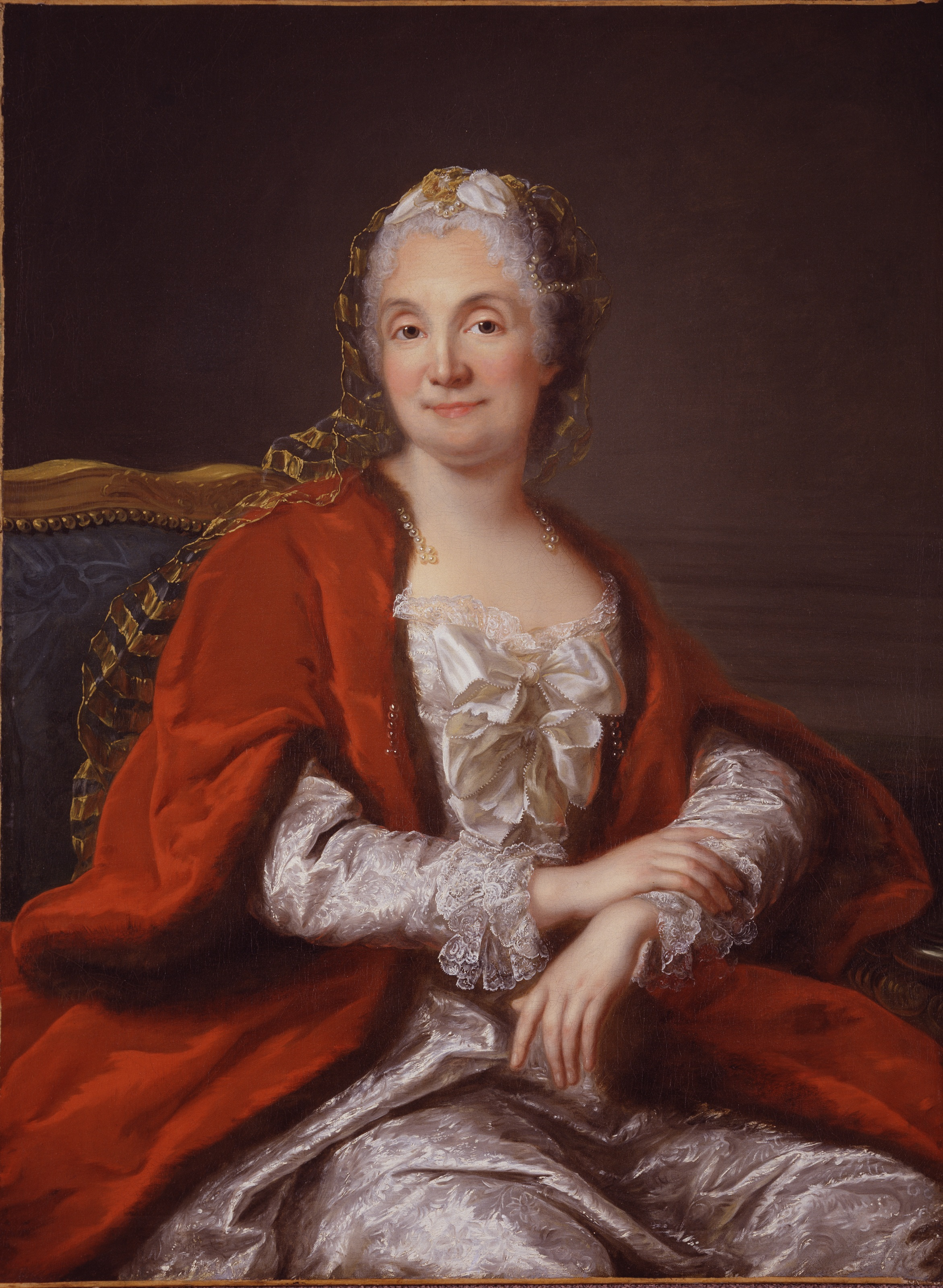
Presumed portrait of Mme Geoffrin, by Marianne Loir (National Museum of Women in the Arts, Washington, D.C.)

=== Maria de Gourney ===
From a young age, Marie de Gourney – a writer Born in Paris at the peak of the Renaissance period in France – was very involved in several languages, including Greek, Latin, and Spanish, and as she grew older, she developed an interest in humanist scholarship and the French language. Her correspondence with French Humanist Justus Lipsius and her interactions with Michel de Montaigne, who adopted her as his pupil, are known as the beginning of her writing career in the Republic of Letters. Later in her life, she had letters to Montaigne that were in retaliation to his views about female education. Throughout her career, she worked to merge social reform with scientific and intellectual discussion using the Republic of Letters.

== See also ==
- Coffeehouse
- Daniel Roche
- Dictionnaire philosophique
- Encyclopédie
- English coffeehouses in the 17th and 18th centuries
- Robert Darnton
- Science in the Age of Enlightenment
- Societas eruditorum incognitorum in terris Austriacis

== Bibliography ==
- Bots, Hans; Waquet, Françoise (1997), La République des lettres (in French), Paris, France & Brussels, Belgium: Belin & De Boeck, ISBN 9782701121116
- Brockliss, L. W. B. (2002), Calvet's Web: Enlightenment and the Republic of Letters in Eighteenth-Century France, Oxford, England & New York, NY: Oxford University Press, ISBN 9780199247486
- Casanova, Pascale (2004) [1999], The World Republic of Letters, translated by DeBevoise, M. B., Cambridge, MA & London, England: Harvard University Press, ISBN 9780674013452
- Dalton, Susan (2003), Engendering the Republic of Letters: Reconnecting Public and Private Spheres, Montreal, QC: McGill-Queen's University Press, ISBN 9780773526181
- Daston, Lorraine (1991), "The Ideal and Reality of the Republic of Letters in the Enlightenment", Science in Context, 4 (2): 367–386, doi:10.1017/s0269889700001010
- Dibon, Paul (1978), "Communication in the Respublica Literaria of the 17th Century", Res Publica Litterarum, 1: 43–55, ISSN 0275-4304
- Evans, R. J. W. (1977), "Learned Societies in Germany in the Seventeenth Century", European History Quarterly, 7 (2): 129–151, doi:10.1177/026569147700700201, S2CID 143795722
- Feingold, Mordechai, ed. (2003), Jesuit Science and the Republic of Letters, Cambridge, MA & London, England: MIT Press, ISBN 9780262062343
- Fiering, Norman (1976), "The Transatlantic Republic of Letters: A Note on the Circulation of Learned Periodicals to Early Eighteenth-Century America", William and Mary Quarterly, 33 (4): 642–660, doi:10.2307/1921719, JSTOR 1921719.
- Furey, Constance M. (2006), Erasmus, Contarini, and the Religious Republic of Letters, Cambridge, England & New York, NY: Cambridge University Press, ISBN 9780521849876
- Füssel, Marian (2006), "'The Charlatanry of the Learned': On the Moral Economy of the Republic of Letters in Eighteenth-Century Germany", Cultural and Social History, 3 (3): 287–300, doi:10.1191/1478003806cs062oa, S2CID 145805291
- Goldgar, Anne (1995), Impolite Learning: Conduct and Community in the Republic of Letters, 1680–1750, New Haven, CT & London, England: Yale University Press, ISBN 9780300053593
- Goodman, Dena (1991), "Governing the Republic of Letters: The Politics of Culture in the French Enlightenment", History of European Ideas, 13 (3): 183–199, doi:10.1016/0191-6599(91)90180-7
- Hunter, Michael (November 2010), "The Great Experiment: The Royal Society", History Today, vol. 60, no. 11, pp. 34–40
- Israel, Jonathan (2001), Radical Enlightenment: Philosophy and the Making of Modernity, 1650–1750, Oxford, England & New York, NY: Oxford University Press, ISBN 9780198206088
- Jacob, Margaret C. (2006), Strangers Nowhere in the World: The Rise of Cosmopolitanism in Early Modern Europe, Philadelphia, PA: University of Pennsylvania Press, ISBN 9780812239331
- Kale, Steven (2004), French Salons: High Society and Political Sociability from the Old Regime to the Revolution of 1848, Baltimore, MD & London, England: Johns Hopkins University Press, ISBN 9780801877292
- Konig, David Thomas (2004), "Influence and Emulation in the Constitutional Republic of Letters", Law and History Review, 22 (1): 179–182, doi:10.2307/4141670, JSTOR 4141670, S2CID 146969519
- Lambe, Patricke (1988), "Critics and Skeptics in the Seventeenth-Century Republic of Letters", The Harvard Theological Review, 81 (3): 271–296, doi:10.1017/S0017816000010105, JSTOR 1509705
- Lilti, Antoine (2005a), "Sociabilité et mondanité: Les hommes de lettres dans les salons parisiens au XVIIIe siècle" [Sociability & Mundanity: The Men of Letters in the Parisian Salons of the XVIII Century], French Historical Studies (in French), 28 (3): 415–445, doi:10.1215/00161071-28-3-415
- Lilti, Antoine (2005b), Le Monde des salons: sociabilité et mondanité à Paris au XVIIIe siècle (in French), Paris, France: Fayard, ISBN 9782213622927; published in English as The World of the Salons: Sociability and Worldliness in Eighteenth-Century Paris, translated by Cochrane, Lydia G., Oxford, England & New York, NY: Oxford University Press, 2015, ISBN 9780199772346
- Lux, David S.; Cook, Harold J. (1998), "Closed Circles or Open Networks: Communicating at a Distance during the Scientific Revolution" (PDF), History of Science, 36 (2): 179–211, doi:10.1177/007327539803600203, archived (PDF) from the original on 2020-05-08
- Maclean, Ian (March 2008), "The Medical Republic of Letters before the Thirty Years War", Intellectual History Review, 18 (1): 15–30, doi:10.1080/17496970701819327, S2CID 162244659
- Mayhew, Robert (April 2004), "British Geography's Republic of Letters: Mapping an Imagined Community, 1600–1800", Journal of the History of Ideas, 65 (2): 251–276, doi:10.1353/jhi.2004.0029, JSTOR 3654209, S2CID 143514543
- Mokyr, Joel (2017), A Culture of Growth: The Origins of the Modern Economy, Princeton, NJ & Oxford, England: Princeton University Press, ISBN 9780691168883
- Ostrander, Gilman M. (1999), Republic of Letters: The American Intellectual Community, 1776–1865, Madison, WI: Madison House, ISBN 9780945612636
- Shelford, April G. (2007), Transforming the Republic of Letters: Pierre-Daniel Huet and European Intellectual Life, 1650–1720, Rochester, NY & Woodbridge, England: University of Rochester Press & Boydell & Brewer, ISBN 9781580462433
- Stroup, Alice (1990), A Company of Scientists: Botany, Patronage, and Community at the Seventeenth-Century Parisian Royal Academy of Sciences, Berkeley & Los Angeles, CA; London, England: University of California Press, ISBN 9780520059498
- Ultee, Maarten (1987), "The Republic of Letters: Learned Correspondence 1680–1720", The Seventeenth Century, 2 (1): 95–112, doi:10.1080/0268117X.1987.10555263
