= Ravil Faizullin =

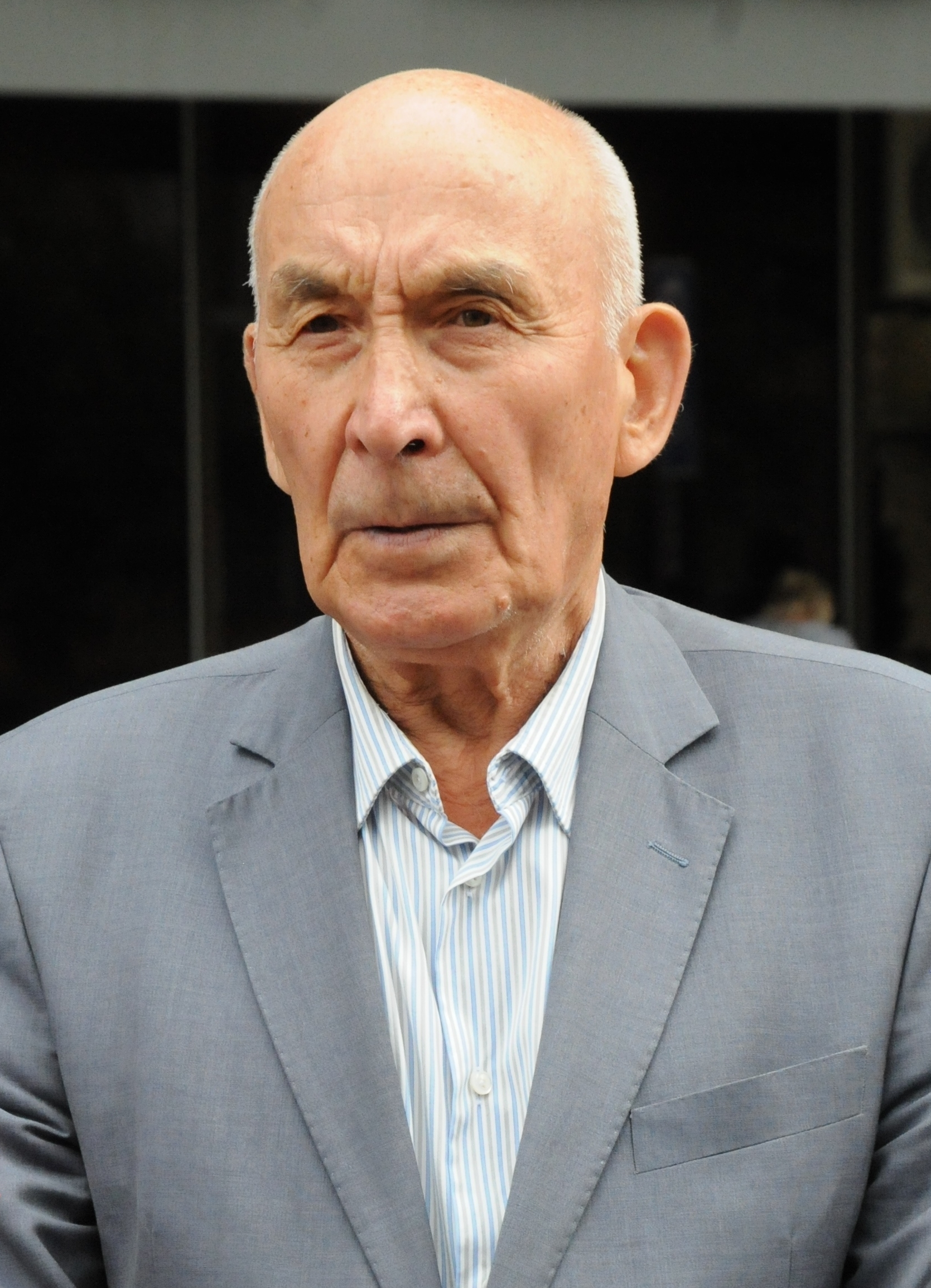
- Faizullin in 2019
- Native name: Равил Габдрахман улы Фәйзуллин
- Born: August 4, 1943 (age 82); Yulsubino, Rybno-Slobodsky District, Tatar ASSR, USSR

Ravil Gabdrahmanovich Faizullin (Note: romanized: Ravil' Gabdrahmanovich Faizullin) (Russian: Рави́л Габдрахма́нович Файзу́ллин, Tatar: Равил Габдрахман улы Фәйзуллин; born August 4, 1943) is a Tatar writer, editor, poet and publicist. People's Poet of Tatarstan (1999), Honored Artist of the RSFSR, laureate of the Gabdulla Tukay Republican Prize (1978), and the Musa Cälil Tatar Komsomol Prize (1970).

== Biography ==
R. A. Fayzullin was born on August 4, 1943 in the village of Yulsubino, Rybno-Slobodsky District, Tatar ASSR. He is a Tatar by nationality.

He graduated from the philological faculty of Kazan Federal University (1965), and completed his postgraduate studies at the Institute of Language, Literature and Art named after G. Ibragimov, Academy of Sciences of the Republic of Tatarstan.

Having entered literature early (in the 1960s he was the youngest member of the Writers' Union of the USSR in the country), R. A. Fayzullin made a significant contribution to the development of multinational poetry over 45 years of active creative work.

Since the 1960s, R. A. Fayzullin's work has always been in the center of attention of the literary community; hundreds of articles and studies have been published about him in the central and republican press. He has published more than fifty books in Russian, Tatar, Bashkir and other languages, with a total circulation of about a million copies.

Since 1965, member of the Writers' Union of the USSR.

In 1968–1972 – head of the Almetyevsk branch of the Writers' Union of the Tatar ASSR.

In 1972–1976 – deputy chairman of the Writers' Union of the Tatar ASSR.

In 1976–1989 – professional writer.

Since 1989 – editor–in-chief of the magazine "Kazan utlary".

1990–1995 people's deputy of the State Council of the Republic of Tatarstan.

Honorary member of the Academy of Sciences of the Republic of Tatarstan.

He was a delegate to a number of congresses of writers of the RSFSR and the USSR, was elected to the governing bodies of the Writers' Union of the USSR and the RSFSR.

The poet's poems, poems and journalism have been repeatedly translated into the languages of the peoples of Europe and Asia. The works of R. A. Faizullin are known in Italy, England, France, Syria, Hungary, Mongolia and other countries. His name and works have been included in multi-volume Russian anthologies, textbooks, and encyclopedias. Some examples of his works are also included in the "Library of World Literature".

== Titles and awards ==
- People's Poet of the Republic of Tatarstan (1999)
- Honored Artist of the RSFSR
- Gabdulla Tukay State Prize of the Republic of Tatarstan (1978)
- Komsomol Prize of Tatarstan named after Musa Jalil (1970).
- Order of Friendship (2006)

== Published books ==
- Саз: стихи / translated from Tatar language — М.: Мол. Гвардия, 1974. — 112 pages — 18000 экз.
- Moment of Return: Poems (Миг возвращения: стихи) / пер. с татар. — М.: Сов. писатель, 1976. — 160 pages — 10000 экз.
- My finest hour: poems and verses (Мой звёздный час: стихи и поэмы) / предисл. М.Карима; пер. с татар. — М.: Soviet Russia, 1978. — 350 с. — 20000 экз.
- Short Poems: Poems (Короткие стихи: стихи) / предисл. В.Туркина; пер. с татар. — М.: Современник, 1984. — 127 с. — 10000 экз.
- Light in the Grain: Poems and Verses (Свет в зерне: стихи и поэмы) / пер. с татар. — М.: Сов. Россия, 1984. — 240 с. — 20000 экз.
- Rivers flow, flow: poems for children (Текут, текут реки: стихи для детей) / пер. с татар. — М.: Дет. лит., 1987. — 64 p. — 100000 экз.
- Silhouette: Poems (Силуэт: стихи) / пер. с татар. — Казань: Татар. кн. изд-во, 1988. — 223 с. — 4000 экз.
- Moon Poplars: Poems and Verses (Лунные тополя: стихи и поэмы) / пер. с татар. — М.: Худож. лит., 1990. — 415 с.— 9000 экз.

== Literature ==
- Равиль Файзуллин // Сарчин Р. Поэты Татарстана : очерки и заметки. - Казань: Изд-во Академии наук РТ, 2023. — 420 с. — ISBN 978-5-9690-1079-6
- Сарчин Р. Ш. Музыкально-песенные мотивы в татарской поэзии // Исторические, философские, политические и юридические науки, культурология и искусствоведение. Вопросы теории и практики (входит в перечень ВАК). Тамбов: Грамота, 2013. № 3. Ч. 1. С. 143-145. ISSN 1997-292X. // http://scjournal.ru/articles/issn_1997-292X_2013_3-1_39.pdf
- Рыбная Слобода. История родного края
- Песня Тамара Миансарова "Лебеди мои" (Николай Голосов—Равиль Файзуллин) [Song by Tamara Miansarova "My Swans" (Nikolai Golosov—Ravil Fayzullin)] (in Russian).
