= Khudozhestvennaya Literatura =

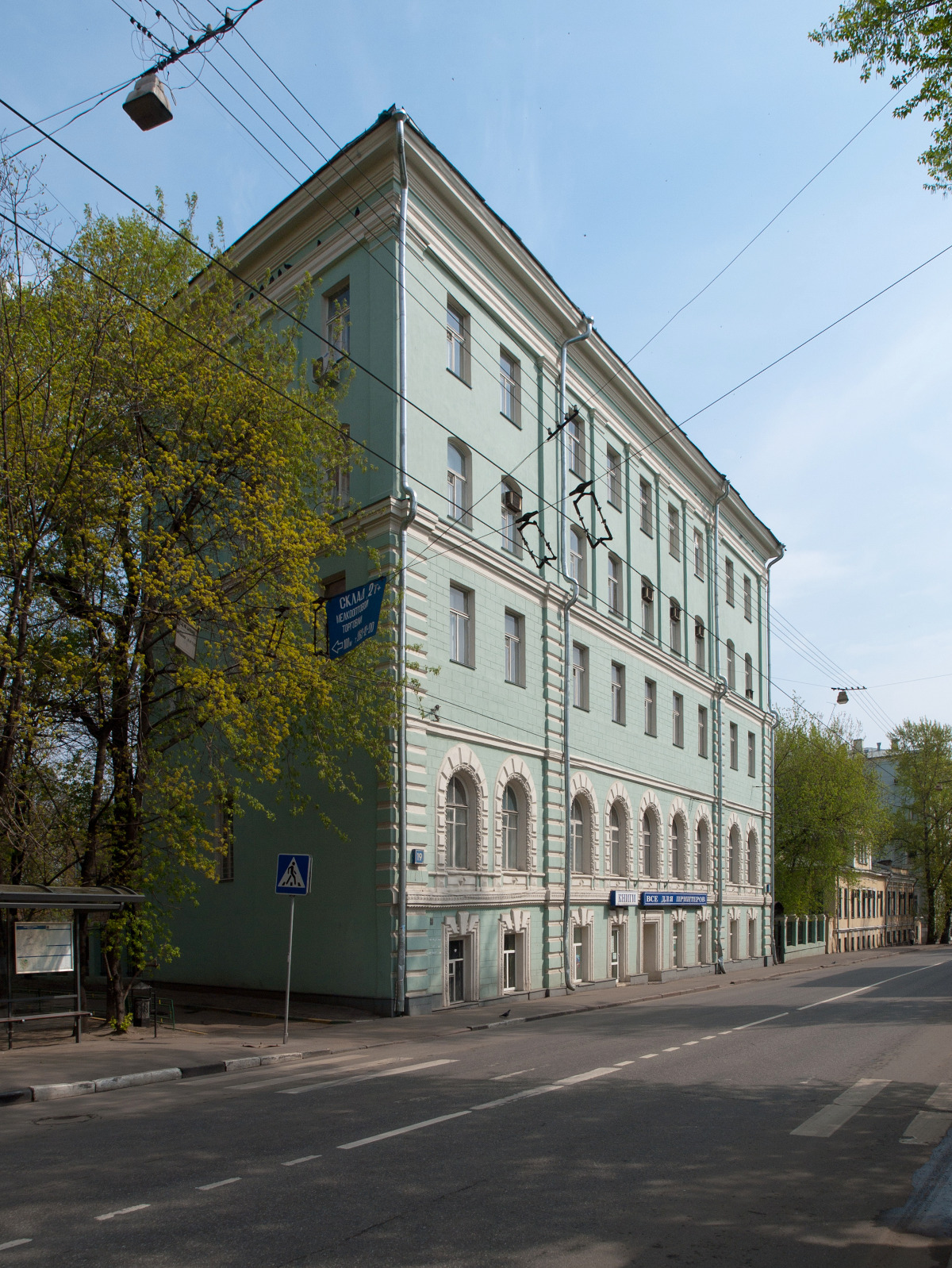
Main office of Khudozhestvennaya Literatura

Khudozhestvennaya Literatura (Russian: Художественная литература) is a publishing house in Saint Petersburg, Russia. The name means "fiction literature" in Russian. It specializes in the publishing of Russian and foreign works of literary fiction in Russia.

== History ==
It was founded as the State Publishing House of Fiction in Moscow, the Soviet Union on October 1, 1930 on the basis of the literary and artistic sector of the State Publishing House and the publishing house "Land and Factory ". In 1934 it was renamed Goslitizdat. In 1937, the disbanded publishing house Academia was merged into it. From 1963 it has been called the Publishing House "Khudozhestvennaya Literatura" (IHL).

Over the years publishing house has issued classic works of world fiction, as well as the most significant works of contemporary foreign authors. Contemporary Russian authors have been included in the publishing program only if they were part of the group of the most famous writers and generally recognized as "classics of Soviet literature." It was considered one of the leading publishing houses in the Soviet Union.

After perestroika the publishing house experienced a serious crisis associated with both general trends in book publishing and subjective factors, which actually continues to the present day. So, in 1976, 318 books and brochures were published with a circulation of about 46.5 million copies; in 1986, 334 publications with a circulation of 85 million copies; in 1991, 277 books with a circulation of almost 38 million copies; in 1994, 58 books with a circulation of 2 million copies; in 1995, not a single book; and in 1996, 38 books with a circulation of barely 0.5 million copies. The circulation of the publishing house has decreased considerably: in 2015, "Khudozhestvennaya literatura" was not even included in the Top 100 Russian publishing houses in terms of the number of published books and brochures.

== Book series ==
- Забытая книга (= Forgotten Book)
- Библиотека античной литературы (= Library of Ancient Literature) (founded 1963)
- Библиотека всемирной литературы (= Library of World Literature) (1967-c. 1977), 200 volumes
- Народная библиотека (= People's Library) (1930-77); continued with series Классики и современники (Classics and Contemporaries) (1977- )
- Библиотека литературы Возрождения (= Renaissance Literature Library)
- Библиотека исторического романа (= Historical Novel Library)
- Библиотека учителя (= Teacher's Library)
- Библиотека польской литературы (= Library of Polish Literature)
- Библиотека финской литературы (= Library of Finnish Literature)
- Библиотека японской литературы (= Library of Japanese Literature)
- Библиотека китайской литературы (= Library of Chinese Literature)
- Библиотека индийской литературы (= Library of Indian Literature)
- Восточный альманах (= Eastern Almanac)
- Памятники литературы Древней Руси (= Monuments of Literature of Ancient Russia) (1978- )
- Библиотека произведений, удостоенных Ленинской премии (= Library of Works Awarded the Lenin Prize)
- Литературные мемуары (= Literary Memoirs)
- Зарубежный роман XX века (= Foreign Novel of the 20th Century) (1957-1991)
- Библиотека классики (= Library of Classics) (1977-91)
- Русская муза (= Russian Muse) (1985- )
- Библиотека советской поэзии (= Library of Soviet Poetry) (1957- )
- Сокровища лирической поэзии (= Treasures of Lyric Poetry) (1963- )
- Библиотека Фантастики (= Library of Science Fiction)
