= Denis Vairasse =

Denis Vairasse d' Allais (c.1630–1672) was a French Huguenot writer, especially known for his Utopian novel, History of Sevarambes.

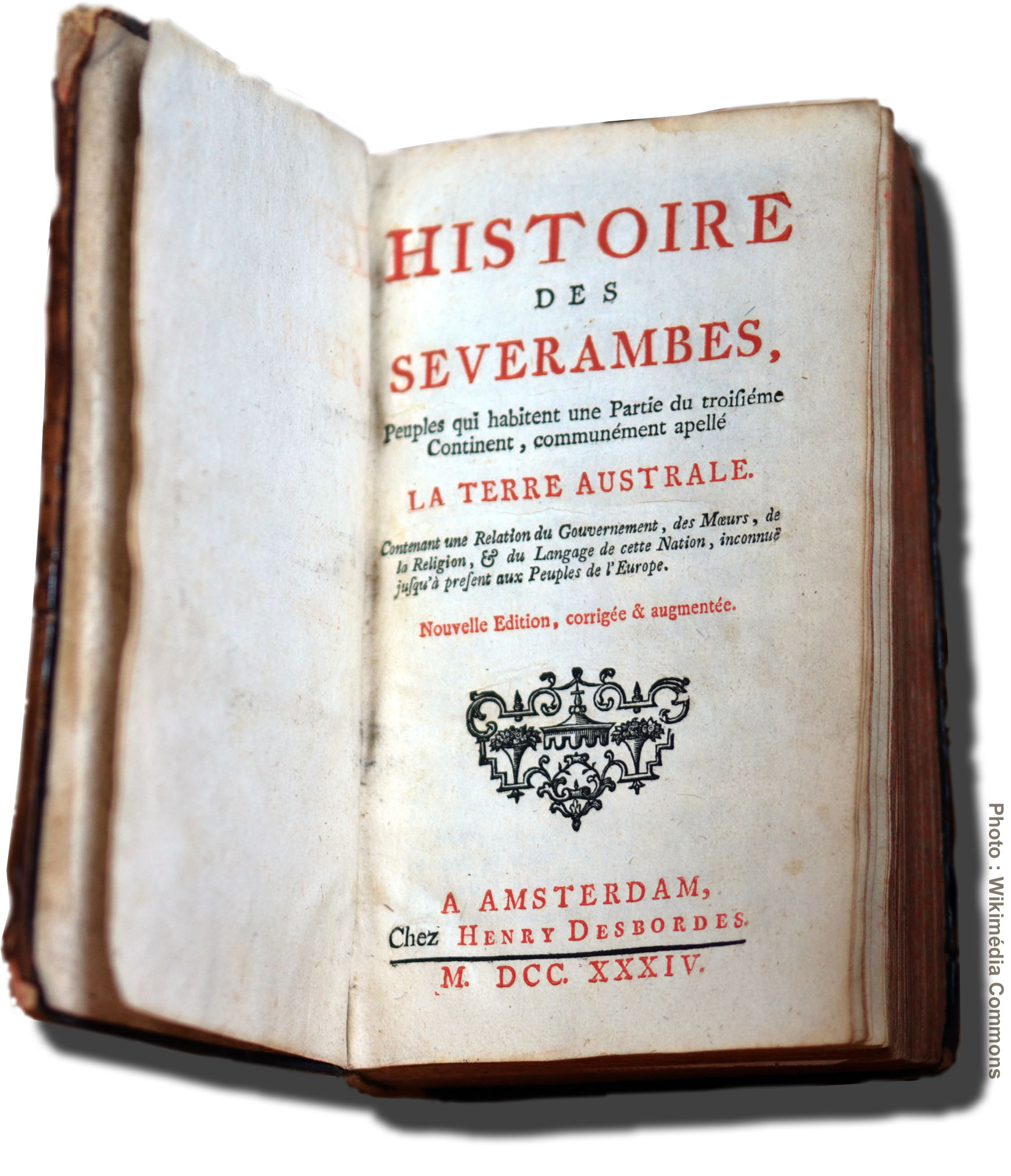
Photograph of the work

== Biography ==
Vairasse was born in a Protestant lower-middle-class family in France, and belonged to the royal troops. He studied ethics, for which he was awarded a doctorate in around 1660. As a Protestant, he was forced into exile in England by the religious conflicts in France during the seventeenth century, where he wrote his History of the Severambians; later translated into French and then a number of other European languages after it found popular success.

== Works ==
=== History of Sevarambes ===
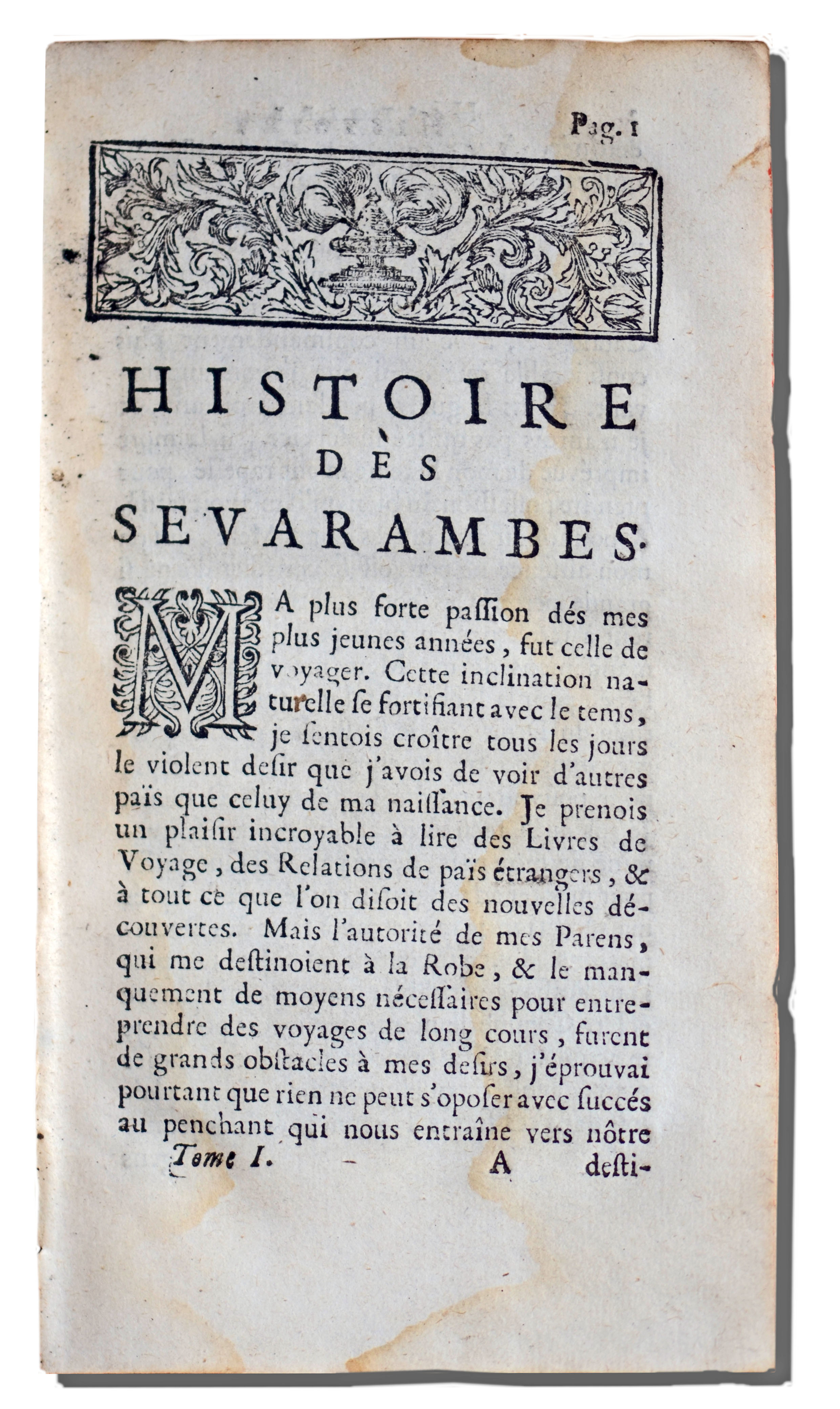
first page of History of Sevarambes (after the introduction), in the edition of 1734 published by the editor Henry Desbordes in Amsterdam

(Full Title: The history of the Sevarites or Sevarambi, a nation inhabiting part of the third continent commonly called Terræ australes incognitæ with an account of their admirable government, religion, customs, and language / written by one Captain Siden, a worthy person, who, together with many others, was cast upon those coasts, and lived many years in that country.)

"People which live part of the unintermitting third, commonly called the southern land, containing a relation of the Government, manners, religion & language of this nation, unknown factor until now at the people of Europe", on the assumption of the existence of Southern lands nondiscovered in Indian Ocean in the south-east of Cape of Good Hope.

His major work was Histoire of Séverambes, a Utopian novel set in Australia, a travel story akin to Thomas More's Utopia and Jonathan Swift's Gulliver's Travels. Authors such as Bayle, Rousseau, Kant and Cabet read it and were probably inspired by some parts of it, and the book was directed referenced by Montesquieu in chapter VI of his book "Spirit of Laws". An innovation of this book, presented in the manner of works of geography or anthropology, was the integration in the romance construction of direct criticism of the revealed and imposed religions, and in particular of the Catholicism of the 17th century.

Initially published in 1675 in London and in English, it then appeared in French in two parts (1677–1679), the first being, according to the author, a kind of "historical journal". Further editions were later published including one (New edition, corrected & increased) by Henry Desbordes in Amsterdam in 1734.

The book was an international success, translated into several languages, "originally in English, then in a French version that spurred German, Dutch, and Italian translations (Atkinson 1920).". The first French translation was in 1682 (before another version in 1702), Dutch in 1683, German in 1689 (and again in 1714), and Italian in 1728.

It was recently republished in French (based on a 1787 French edition) in a contemporary form, orthography and typography, and without the cuts made in the back issue.

== See also ==
- History of the Sevarambians
