= Vinsobres AOC =

- Wine region
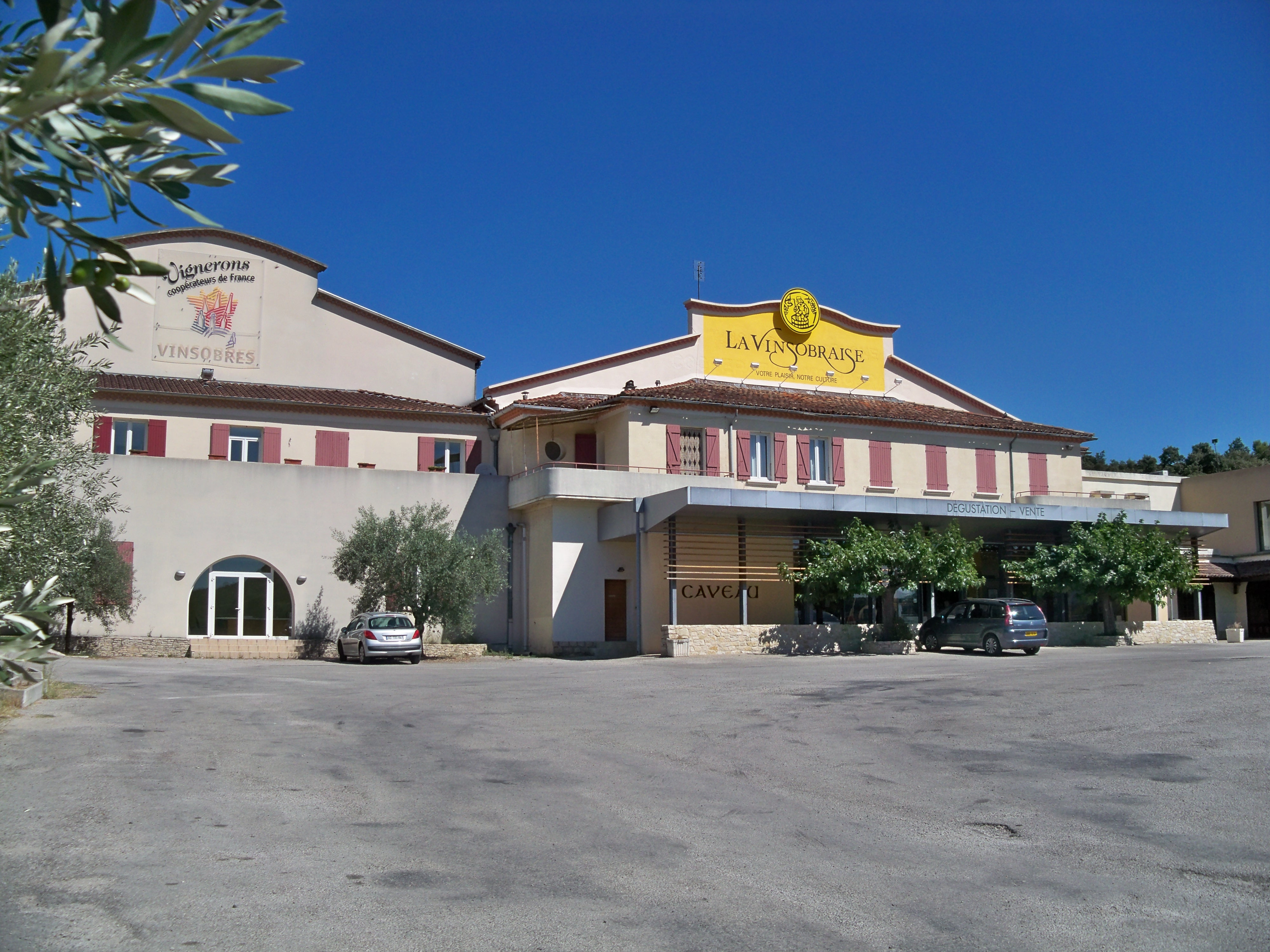
- Official name: Vinsobres
- Type: Appellation d'origine contrôlée
- Country: France
- Part of: Southern Rhone
- Other regions in Southern Rhone: Châteauneuf-du-Pape, Vacqueyras, Lirac
- Climate region: Mediterranean climate
- Size of planted vineyards: 1385 hectares
- Grapes produced: Grenache, Syrah, Mourvedre, Cinsault
- Wine produced: 15,000 hl (2005)

Vinsobres (French pronunciation: [vɛ̃sɔbʁ]) is an Appellation d'Origine Contrôlée (AOC) for red wine in the southern part of the Rhône wine region of France, situated around Vinsobres.

Vinsobres was previously a part of the Côtes-du-Rhône Villages AOC. On 17 February 2006, it was created as a separate AOC, and therefore received the status of a "Rhône Cru". The wines must contain at least 50% Grenache and 25% Syrah and/or Mourvèdre.

Historically, this area has a strong tradition in olive cultivation, and some current vineyards have been converted from growing olives.
