= Nouvelles de la république des lettres =

French periodical (1684–1718)

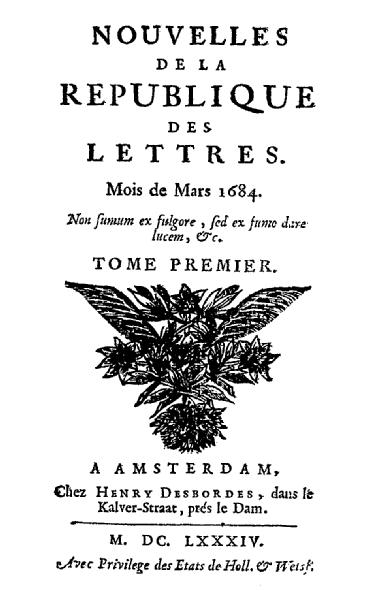
- First issue, 1684
- Language: French

Publication details
- History: 1684–1718
- Frequency: Monthly (1684–1710); Bimonthly(1711–1718)

Standard abbreviations
- ISO 4: Nouv. Répub. Lett.

Indexing
- ISSN: 1873-0019

Nouvelles de la république des lettres (from French: News from the Republic of Letters) was a periodical devoted to reviews of current publications, edited and in large part written by Pierre Bayle. It began publication in 1684, and is the first known book review journal.

Bayle edited it from March 1684 through February 1687; it was continued by Daniel de Larroque, Jean Barrin and Jean Le Clerc through April 1689. Publication was suspended from then until January 1699 when it was resumed under the editorship of Jacques Bernard. He continued it through December 1710; it was then suspended until January 1716, when he resumed and continued until the final issue in June 1718.

Although written in French, it was published in Amsterdam to escape French censorship. The initial publisher was Henri Desbordes from 1684 through 1689 and 1699 through May 1708, and subsequently by Pierre Mortier from June 1708 through December 1710, and David Mortier from January 1716 through June 1718.

Publication was monthly from the beginning through 1710; after that, it was published bi-monthly.

A reproduction was published in Geneva by Slatkine in 1966.
