= Thomas Dereham =

Thomas Dereham, Derham or Durham may refer to:

- Sir Thomas Dereham, 1st Baronet (c. 1600–1668), of the Dereham Baronets
- Sir Thomas Dereham, 4th Baronet (c. 1678–1739)
- Thomas Derham (died 1444/1445), MP for Bishop's Lynn
- Thomas Durham School, Philadelphia

== See also ==
- Dereham (surname)
