= Francesco Maria Molza =

Italian poet

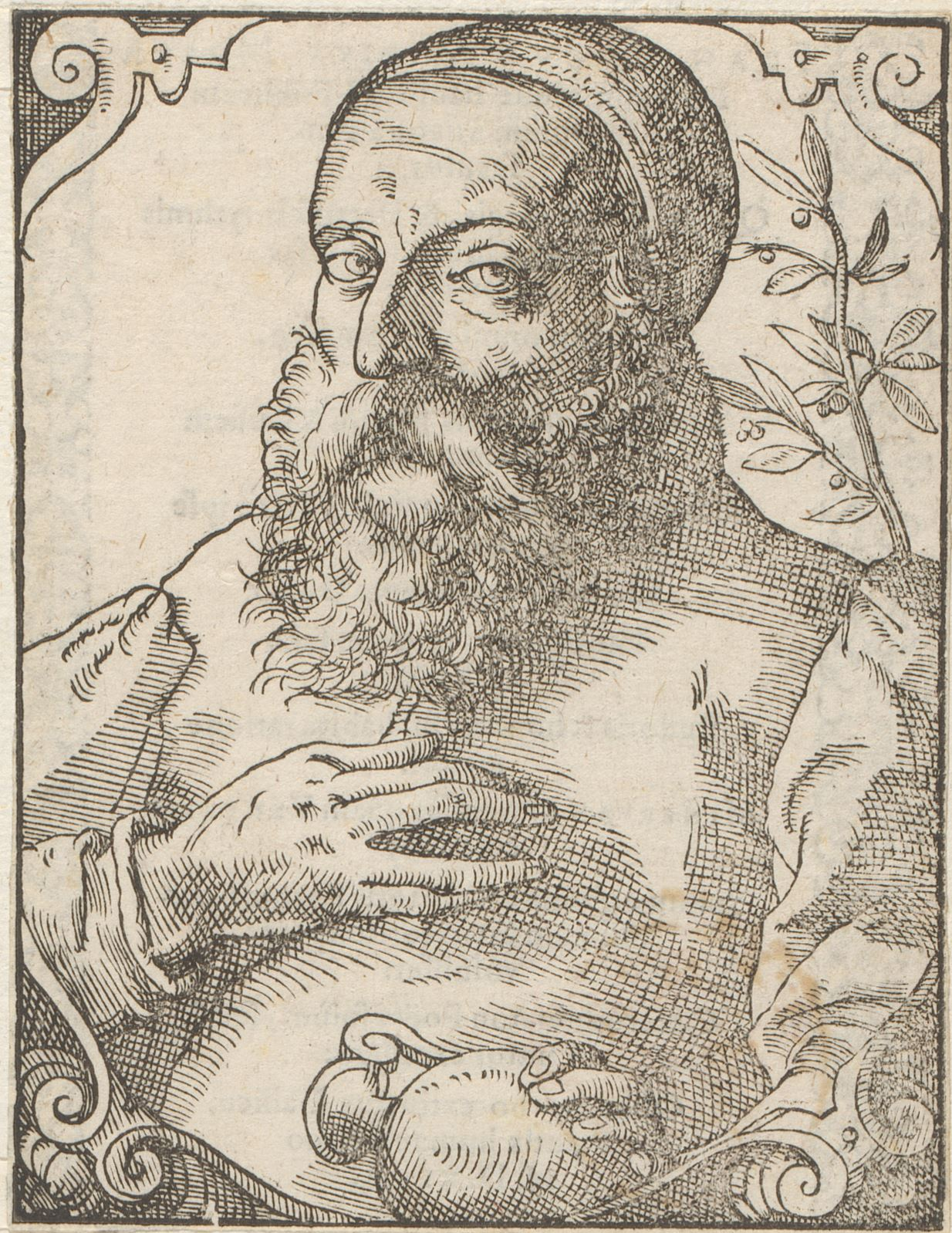
Portrait of Francesco Maria Molza by Tobias Stimmer

Francesco Maria Molza (18 June 1489 in Modena – 28 February 1544 in Modena) was an Italian poet of the Renaissance. He has been described as "one of the most promising of contemporary authors".

== Life ==
Pope Leo X, known as the Medici Pope, carried on his family's tradition of patronage of the arts begun by his great-grandfather Cosimo de' Medici in the Republic of Florence. Upon hearing of the generosity of this new pope, Francesco Maria Molza abandoned his family – parents, wife, and children – and moved to Rome where he became infatuated with a woman and wrote poems to her; he wrote the pastoral poem La ninfa Tiberina in praise of Faustina Mancini and went through a series of various amours. He was at one point attacked and seriously wounded by a would-be assassin. After Leo's death, he moved to Bologna where he joined the entourage of Ippolito de' Medici. He wrote five novellas, four of which were published in Lucca after his death in 1549.

He died in 1544 of syphilis.
