= History of the Sevarambians =

1675 utopian novel by Denis Vairasse

The History of Sevarambians is a utopian novel by Denis Vairasse, published in 1675 as The History of the Sevarites or Sevarambi.

== Publication history and expansion ==
Originally published in English, it was quickly translated into French and expanded, with parts two and three appearing in 1677 as L’Histoire des Sévarambes. Two further installments were published in French in 1679. The novel did not appear in its completed form in English until 1738.

== Plot ==
The first part of the novel tells the story of a shipwreck that occurs during a voyage to Batavia. The ship The Golden Dragon, under Captain Siden, goes ashore in the hypothetical southern continent of Terra Australis. The castaways make their lives for themselves, sustaining themselves through agriculture, hunting, and fishing. Due to the paucity of females present, most of the men shared one with a group of five men, except for the officers, who each were allowed their own wife.

== Influence ==
Gottfried Wilhelm Leibniz, in his Théodicée, referenced the title of this work, using Sevarambian as a synonym for Utopian.
