= Vinsobres =

- Commune
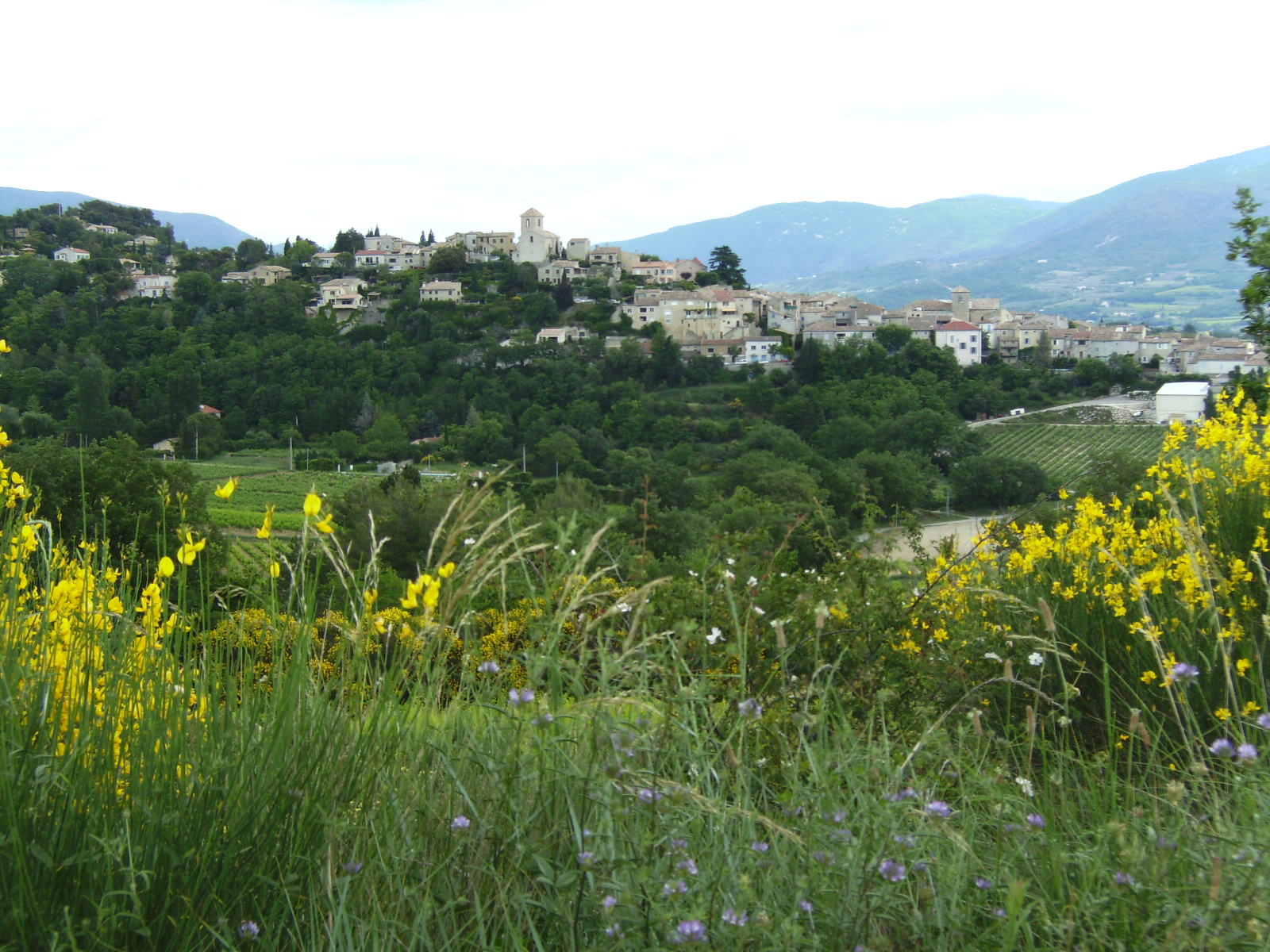
- Vinsobres seen from the west
- Location of Vinsobres
- Location within France Location within Auvergne-Rhône-Alpes
- Coordinates: 44°20′05″N 5°03′43″E
- Country: France
- Region: Auvergne-Rhône-Alpes
- Department: Drôme
- Arrondissement: Nyons
- Canton: Nyons et Baronnies

Government
  - Mayor (2020–2026): Claude Somaglino
- Area^{1}: 35.42 km^{2} (13.68 sq mi)
- Highest elevation: 520 m (1,710 ft)
- Lowest elevation: 184 m (604 ft)
- Population (2023): 1,034
  - Density: 29.19/km^{2} (75.61/sq mi)
- Time zone: UTC+01:00 (CET)
  - Summer (DST): UTC+02:00 (CEST)
- INSEE/Postal code: 26377 /26110
- ^{1} French Land Register data, which excludes lakes, ponds, glaciers > 1 km^{2} (0.386 sq mi or 247 acres) and river estuaries.

Vinsobres (French pronunciation: [vɛ̃sɔbʁ]; Occitan: Vinsòbres) is a commune in the Drôme department in the Auvergne-Rhône-Alpes region in southeastern France.

== Geography ==
Vinsobres is located 9 km south-west of Nyons, 14 km north-east of Tulette, 12 km south-east of Valréas, and 15 km north of Vaison-la-Romaine.

The neighbouring communes are Mirabel-aux-Baronnies and Saint-Maurice-sur-Eygues.

== Climate ==
On average, Vinsobres experiences 24.2 days per year with a minimum temperature below 0 °C (32.0 °F), 0.1 days per year with a minimum temperature below −10 °C (14.0 °F), 0.9 days per year with a maximum temperature below 0 °C (32.0 °F), and 45.4 days per year with a maximum temperature above 30 °C (86.0 °F). The record high temperature was 43.0 °C (109.4 °F) on August 23, 2023, while the record low temperature was −10.6 °C (12.9 °F) on February 7, 2012.

Climate data for Vinsobres (1991–2020 normals, extremes 1990–present)
Month	Jan	Feb	Mar	Apr	May	Jun	Jul	Aug	Sep	Oct	Nov	Dec	Year
Record high °C (°F)	21.5 (70.7)	23.0 (73.4)	26.8 (80.2)	30.0 (86.0)	34.2 (93.6)	41.9 (107.4)	40.7 (105.3)	43.0 (109.4)	35.7 (96.3)	31.9 (89.4)	24.1 (75.4)	20.1 (68.2)	43.0 (109.4)
Mean daily maximum °C (°F)	9.9 (49.8)	10.9 (51.6)	15.0 (59.0)	18.0 (64.4)	22.3 (72.1)	26.9 (80.4)	30.0 (86.0)	29.7 (85.5)	24.4 (75.9)	19.4 (66.9)	13.6 (56.5)	10.3 (50.5)	19.2 (66.6)
Daily mean °C (°F)	6.2 (43.2)	6.6 (43.9)	10.0 (50.0)	12.8 (55.0)	16.8 (62.2)	20.9 (69.6)	23.7 (74.7)	23.4 (74.1)	19.0 (66.2)	14.9 (58.8)	9.8 (49.6)	6.8 (44.2)	14.2 (57.6)
Mean daily minimum °C (°F)	2.5 (36.5)	2.3 (36.1)	5.1 (41.2)	7.7 (45.9)	11.3 (52.3)	14.9 (58.8)	17.3 (63.1)	17.2 (63.0)	13.6 (56.5)	10.4 (50.7)	6.1 (43.0)	3.3 (37.9)	9.3 (48.8)
Record low °C (°F)	−6.6 (20.1)	−10.6 (12.9)	−7.6 (18.3)	−1.6 (29.1)	2.7 (36.9)	7.1 (44.8)	9.7 (49.5)	10.2 (50.4)	4.6 (40.3)	−4.6 (23.7)	−5.0 (23.0)	−8.2 (17.2)	−10.6 (12.9)
Average precipitation mm (inches)	61.5 (2.42)	42.1 (1.66)	50.7 (2.00)	71.9 (2.83)	64.6 (2.54)	43.5 (1.71)	37.6 (1.48)	51.3 (2.02)	102.6 (4.04)	102.1 (4.02)	106.4 (4.19)	54.2 (2.13)	788.5 (31.04)
Average precipitation days (≥ 1.0 mm)	7.1	5.9	6.2	7.6	7.3	5.2	3.9	4.7	5.9	7.7	8.9	7.1	77.5
Source: Meteociel

== History ==
Alphonse de Bounard was the Marquis of Archimbaud, Lord of Roquebrune, Vérone and Vinsobres, Baron of Montguers and royalist member of parliament for Nyons.

According to the tradition he was descended from the Cort Palatine and Italian painter, Arcimboldo.

=== Toponymy ===
The oldest form is de Vinzobrio, attested in 1137. It is made up of the root, vintio-, which originates from the pre-Celtic vin-t (height), and from the Celtic suffix briga (mountain).

== Population ==
Historical population
Year	Pop.	±% p.a.
1968	754	—
1975	807	+0.98%
1982	911	+1.75%
1990	1,062	+1.94%
1999	1,089	+0.28%
2007	1,093	+0.05%
2012	1,153	+1.07%
2017	1,115	−0.67%
2023	1,034	−1.25%
Source: INSEE

== Sights ==
- The ruins of a castle keep tower over the village, and the remains of the medieval enclosure and one gate, known as the "Portalou" can also be seen.
- La Touche, Deurre and the Château of Véronne: are all fortified houses dating from the Modern Period.

== Economy ==
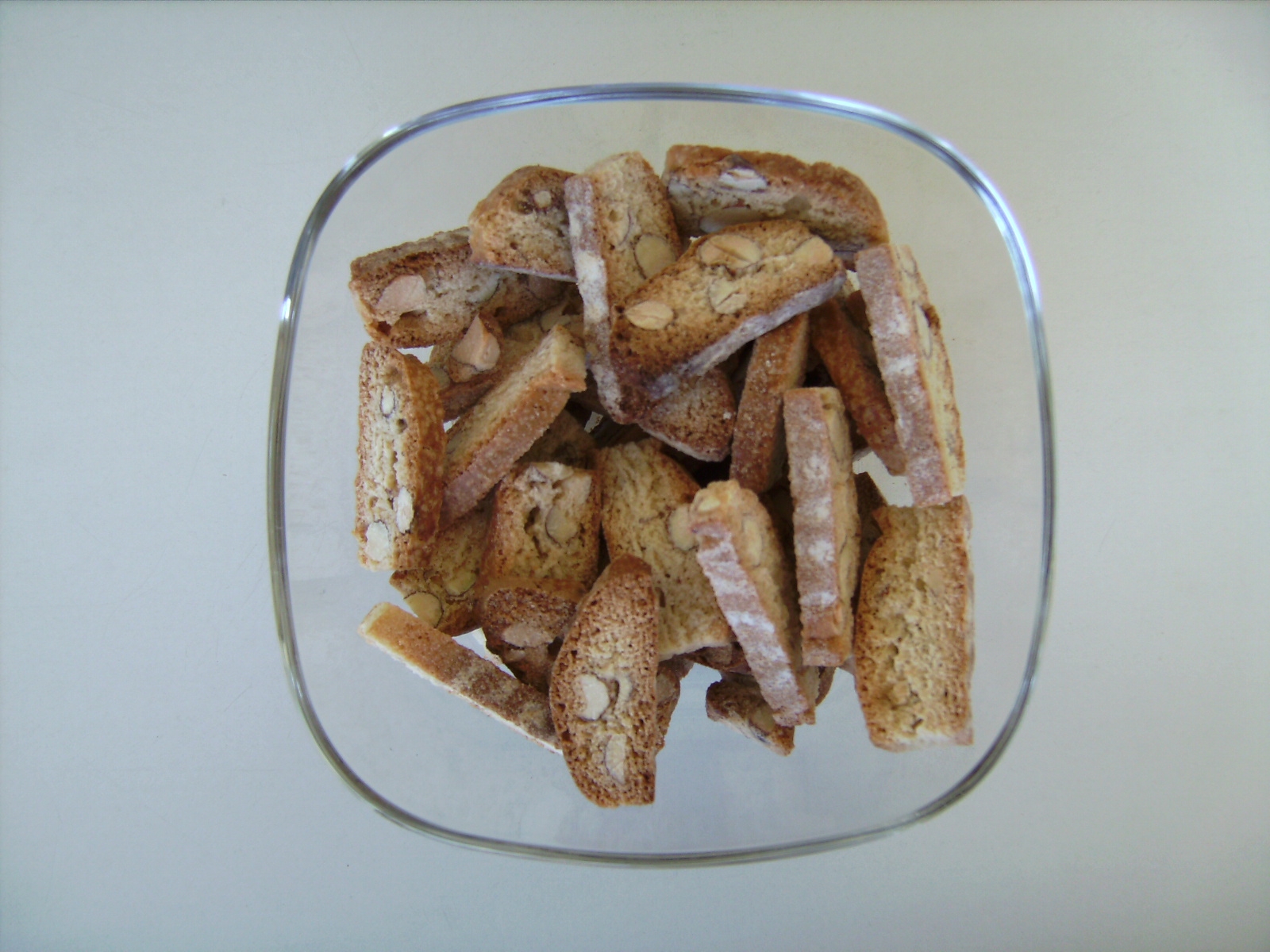
Croquettes de Vinsobres

=== Wine ===
Vinsobres is an appellation for red wine since 2006.

== See also ==
- Communes of the Drôme department
