= Henri Desbordes =

Henri Desbordes (died circa 1722) was a Huguenot printer who was exiled from his business in France and set up as a publisher in Amsterdam in the 17th century. Among his works was Nouvelles de la république des lettres.

== Career ==
Henri Desbordes was one of the most successful refugee booksellers in Saumur serving the theology students of his neighboring Protestant academy as well as ministers. In 1682 suspicion arose of him of having printed the anti-catholic Preservatif contre le changement de religion (A Preservation against the Change of Religion), which was written by Pierre Jurieu, and the authorities sent him to prison.

Desbordes moved to Amsterdam after his release where in July 1682 he became a member of Amsterdam's Walloon church. Apart from religious coercion, according to sources, he may have resettled in Amsterdam because he wished to open a shop abroad as at that time he possessed enough funds to do so. The shop he subsequently opened was situated in the commercial Kalverstraat. Among others, Nouvelles de la république des lettres was one of the journals he published there.

Beside printing more than 100 publications and selling books, Desbordes was also involved in conducting auctions.

== Personal life ==
Jaques Desbordes was the nephew of Henri Desbordes. Jaques was also noted for being a Huguenot publisher who took refuge in the Netherlands in the late 17th century.
