= Jigokuhen =

Jigokuhen may refer to:

- "Hell Screen" (Japanese: 地獄変), 1918 short story by Ryūnosuke Akutagawa
- Portrait of Hell (Japanese: 地獄変), 1969 film by Shirō Toyoda based on the story
